= Economy of Russia =

- The Moscow International Business Center, the financial centre of Russia
- Currency: Russian ruble (RUB or руб or ₽)
- Fiscal year: Calendar year
- Trade organizations: WTO, BRICS, EAEU, CIS, GECF, APEC, G20 and others
- Country group: Emerging and developing economy; High-income economy; High-income industrial economy

Statistics
- Population: ▲146,080,000 (late 2024 census)
- GDP: ▲$2.86 trillion (nominal; 2026); ▲$7.54 trillion (PPP; 2026)
- GDP rank: 8th (nominal; 2026); 4th (PPP; 2026)
- GDP growth: ▲1.1% (2026f); ▲1.1% (2027f)
- GDP per capita: ▲$19,953 (nominal; 2026); ▲$52,602 (PPP; 2026)
- GDP per capita rank: 63th (nominal; 2026); 43rd (PPP; 2026)
- GDP by sector: Agriculture: 5.6%; Industry: 26.6%; Services: 67.8%; (2022 est.)
- Inflation (CPI): ▲5.9% (2025)
- Population below national poverty line: ▼11% (2021)
- Gini coefficient: ▼33.0 medium (2023, World Bank)
- Human Development Index: ▲0.832 very high (2023) (52nd); ▲0.758 high (2023) IHDI (43rd)
- Corruption Perceptions Index: ▼26 out of 100 points (2023, 141st rank)
- Labor force: ▼73,184,751 (2023); ▲60.8% employment rate (2023)
- Labor force by occupation: Agriculture: 9.4%; Industry: 27.6%; Services: 63%; (2016 est.)
- Unemployment: ▼2.6% (April 2024)
- Youth unemployment: ▼7.6% (2025)
- Informal employment: 19.2% (2025)
- Average gross salary: RUB 103,612 / €1,173 per month
- Average net salary: RUB 90,142 / €1,020 per month
- Main industries: Complete range of mining and extractive industries producing coal, oil, gas, chemicals, and metals; all forms of machine building from rolling mills to high-performance aircraft and space vehicles; defence industries (including radar, missile production, advanced electronic components), shipbuilding; road and rail transportation equipment; communications equipment; agricultural machinery, tractors, and construction equipment; electric power generating and transmitting equipment; medical and scientific instruments; consumer durables, textiles, foodstuffs, handicrafts

External
- Exports: ▼$374.422 billion (2024)
- Export goods: Crude petroleum, refined petroleum, natural gas, coal, wheat, iron (2019)
- Main export partners: China 34.6%; India 17.7%; EU 10.18%; Hungary 1.48%; Slovakia 1.26%; EEU 7.95%; Kazakhstan 4.87%; Armenia 2.47%; Turkey 6.93%; Brazil 3.26%; Uzbekistan 2.06%; South Korea 1.83% (2024)
- Imports: ▼$201.06 billion (2024)
- Import goods: Cars and vehicle parts, packaged medicines, broadcasting equipment, aircraft, computers (2019)
- Main import partners: China 56.6%; EU 16.63%; Germany 4.05%; Italy 2.28%; Poland 1.47%; EEU 6.79%; Kazakhstan 4.75%; Armenia 1.56%; Turkey 4.23%; India 2.41%; South Korea 2.25%; Uzbekistan 1.48% (2024)
- FDI stock: ▲ Inward: $38 billion (2021); ▲ Outward: $64 billion (2021)
- Current account: ▼$55.830 billion (2024); ▼2.714% of GDP (2024)
- Gross external debt: ▲$381.77 billion (December 2022)

Public finance
- Government debt: ▲38,362 ₽ trillion (2024); ▲35.7% of GDP (2024)
- Foreign reserves: ▲$606.7 billion (July 2024) (4th)
- Budget balance: 3.8% of GDP (2022)
- Revenue: ▲65,808 ₽ trillion (2024) ▲35.61% of GDP (2024)
- Spending: ▲69,334 ₽ trillion (2024) ▲37.52% of GDP (2024)
- Credit rating: Standard & Poor's: SD (Domestic); SD (Foreign); SD (T&C Assessment); Outlook: N/A; Moody's: Ca; Outlook: Negative; Fitch: C; Outlook: N/A
- All values, unless otherwise stated, are in US dollars.

Russia has a market-oriented mixed economy considered high-income and highly industrialized. It has the eighth-largest economy in the world by nominal GDP and the fourth-largest economy by GDP (PPP). Due to a volatile currency exchange rate, its GDP measured in nominal terms fluctuates sharply. Russia was the last major economy to join the World Trade Organization (WTO), becoming a member in 2012.

The country has large amounts of energy resources throughout its vast landmass, particularly natural gas and petroleum, which play a crucial role in its energy self-sufficiency and exports. The country is a petrostate, with it having the largest natural gas reserves in the world, the second-largest coal reserves, the eighth-largest oil reserves, and the largest oil shale reserves in Europe. Russia is the third-largest natural gas exporter, the second-largest natural gas producer, the second-largest oil exporter and producer, and the third-largest coal exporter. As of 2026, its foreign exchange reserves are the fourth-largest in the world. As of 2026 few people are unemployed. It is the third-largest exporter of arms in the world. The large oil and gas sector accounted up to 30% of Russia's federal budget revenues in 2024, down from 50% in the mid-2010s, suggesting economic diversification.

Its human development is ranked as "very high" in the annual Human Development Index. The country has the world's tenth-largest consumer market. Russia has the fifth-highest number of billionaires in the world. However, its income inequality remains comparatively high, caused by the variance of natural resources among its federal subjects, leading to regional economic disparities. High levels of corruption, a shrinking labor force and labor shortages, a brain drain, and an aging and declining population also remain major barriers to future economic growth.

Following the 2022 Russian invasion of Ukraine, the country has faced extensive sanctions and other negative financial actions from the Western world and its allies which have the aim of isolating the Russian economy from the Western financial system. However, Russia has transformed into a war economy, and has shown resilience to such measures broadly, and has maintained economic stability and growth driven primarily by high military expenditure, rising household consumption and wages, low unemployment, and increased government spending. Yet, inflation has remained comparatively high, with experts predicting the sanctions will have a long-term negative effect on the Russian economy.

== History ==
The Russian economy has been volatile over the past multiple decades. After 1989, its institutional environment was transformed from a command economy based upon socialist organizations to a capitalistic system. Its industrial structure dramatically shifted away over the course of several years from heavy investment in manufacturing as well as in traditional Soviet agriculture towards free market related developments in natural gas and oil extraction in additional to businesses engaged in mining. A service economy also expanded during this time. The academic analyst Richard Connolly has argued that, over the last four centuries in a broad sense, there were four main characteristics of the Russian economy that have shaped the system and persisted despite the political upheavals. First of all the weakness of the legal system means that impartial courts do not rule and contracts are problematic. Second is the underdevelopment of modern economic activities, with very basic peasant agriculture dominant into the 1930s. Third is technological underdevelopment, eased somewhat by borrowing from the West in the 1920s. And fourth lower living standards compared to Western Europe and North America. In 2020 its foreign exchange reserves were the fifth-largest in the world.

=== Russian Empire ===
The economy of Tsarist Russia comprises the economic history of Russia from the late Middle Ages until the October Revolution of 1917 (which ushered in a period of civil war, culminating in the creation of the Soviet Union).

Russian national income per capita increased and moved to closer to the most developed economies of Northern and Western Europe from the late 17th century to the mid 18th century. After the mid 18th century, the Russian economy stagnated and declined. In the 18th century, Russian national income per capita was about 40–70% of British per capita income but higher than Poland's. By 1860, Russian GDP per capita was similar to that of Japan; one-third of GDP per capita in the United States or the United Kingdom; and twice that of China or India. Russia was a late industrializer. Over the course of the late 19th century and early 20th century, Russia's railroad system expanded considerably, enabling greater industrialization.

Serfdom, which held back development of the wage labor market and created a shortage of labor for industry, was abolished in 1861. In the aftermath, GDP per capita was volatile and did not substantially increase. Steady economic growth began in the 1890s, alongside a structural transformation of the Russian economy. By the time World War I started, more than half the Russian economy was still devoted to agriculture. By the early 20th century, the Russian economy had fallen further behind the American and British economies. From the late 19th century to the early 20th century, the economy grew at a similar pace as the Japanese economy and faster than the Brazilian, Indian and Chinese economies.

=== Soviet Russia and the Soviet Union with socialist economy (1917–1987) ===
Beginning in 1928, the course of the Soviet Union's economy was guided by a series of five-year plans. By the 1950s, the Soviet Union had rapidly evolved from a mainly agrarian society into a major industrial power. By the 1970s the Soviet Union was in an Era of Stagnation. The complex demands of the modern economy and inflexible administration overwhelmed and constrained the central planners. The volume of decisions facing planners in Moscow became overwhelming. The cumbersome procedures for bureaucratic administration foreclosed the free communication and flexible response required at the enterprise level for dealing with worker alienation, innovation, customers, and suppliers.

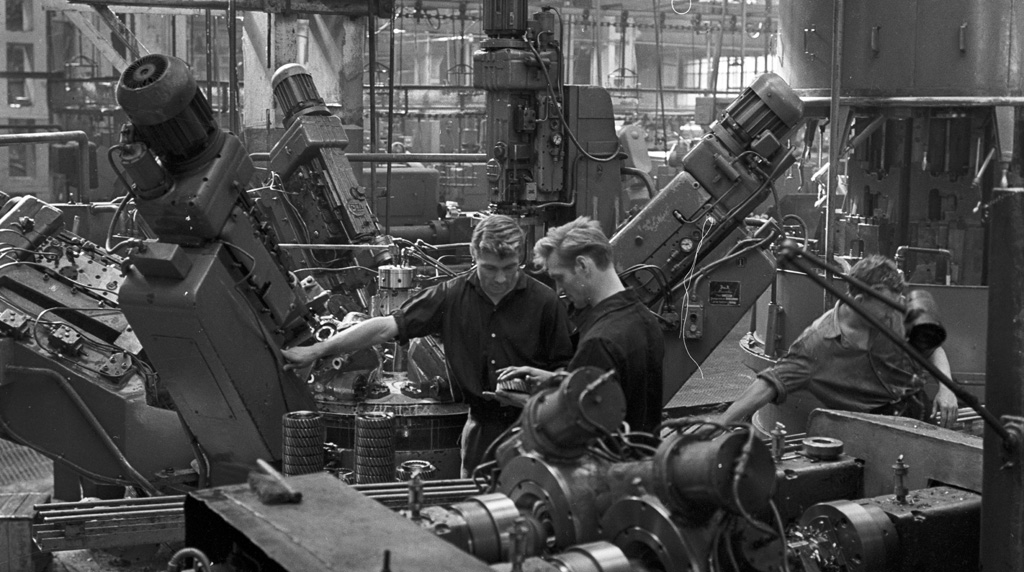
Workers of Moscow Likhachev Automotive Plant, 1963

From 1975 to 1985, corruption and data manipulation became common practice within the bureaucracy to report satisfied targets and quotas, thus entrenching the crisis.

=== Economic reforms within the Soviet system, re-introduction of private property and private business (1987–1991) ===
Starting in 1986, Mikhail Gorbachev attempted to address economic problems by moving towards a market-oriented socialist economy. Gorbachev's policies of Perestroika failed to rejuvenate the Soviet economy; instead, a process of political and economic disintegration culminated in the breakup of the Soviet Union in 1991.

=== Full transition to market economy, prices liberalization and privatization (1991–1997) ===
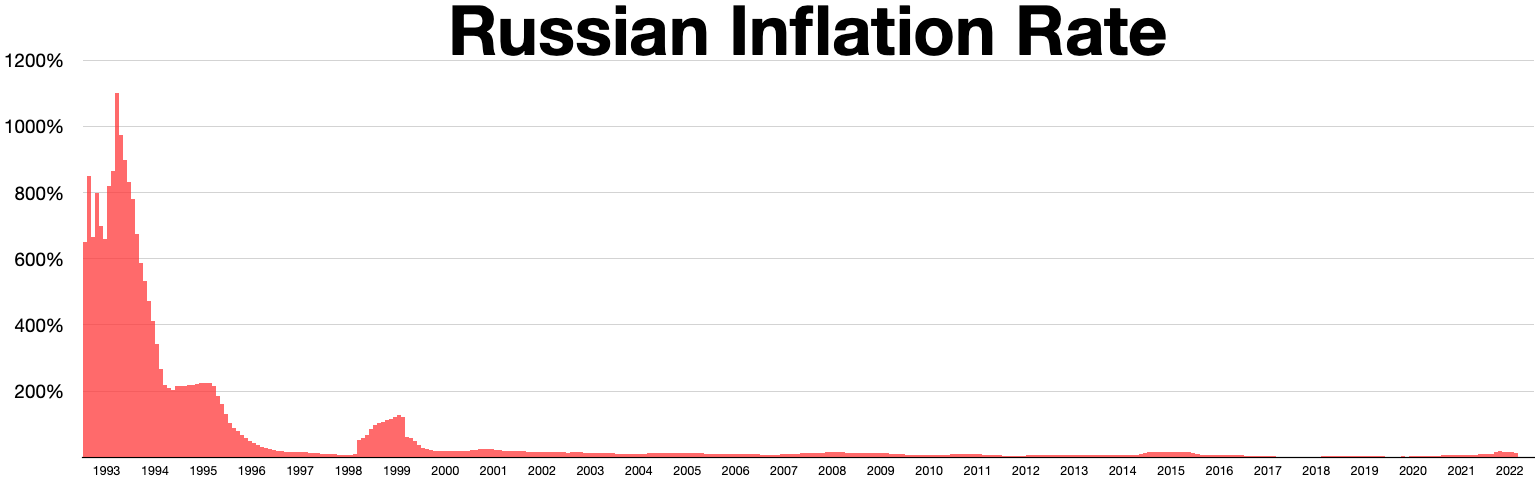
Russian inflation rate 1993–2022

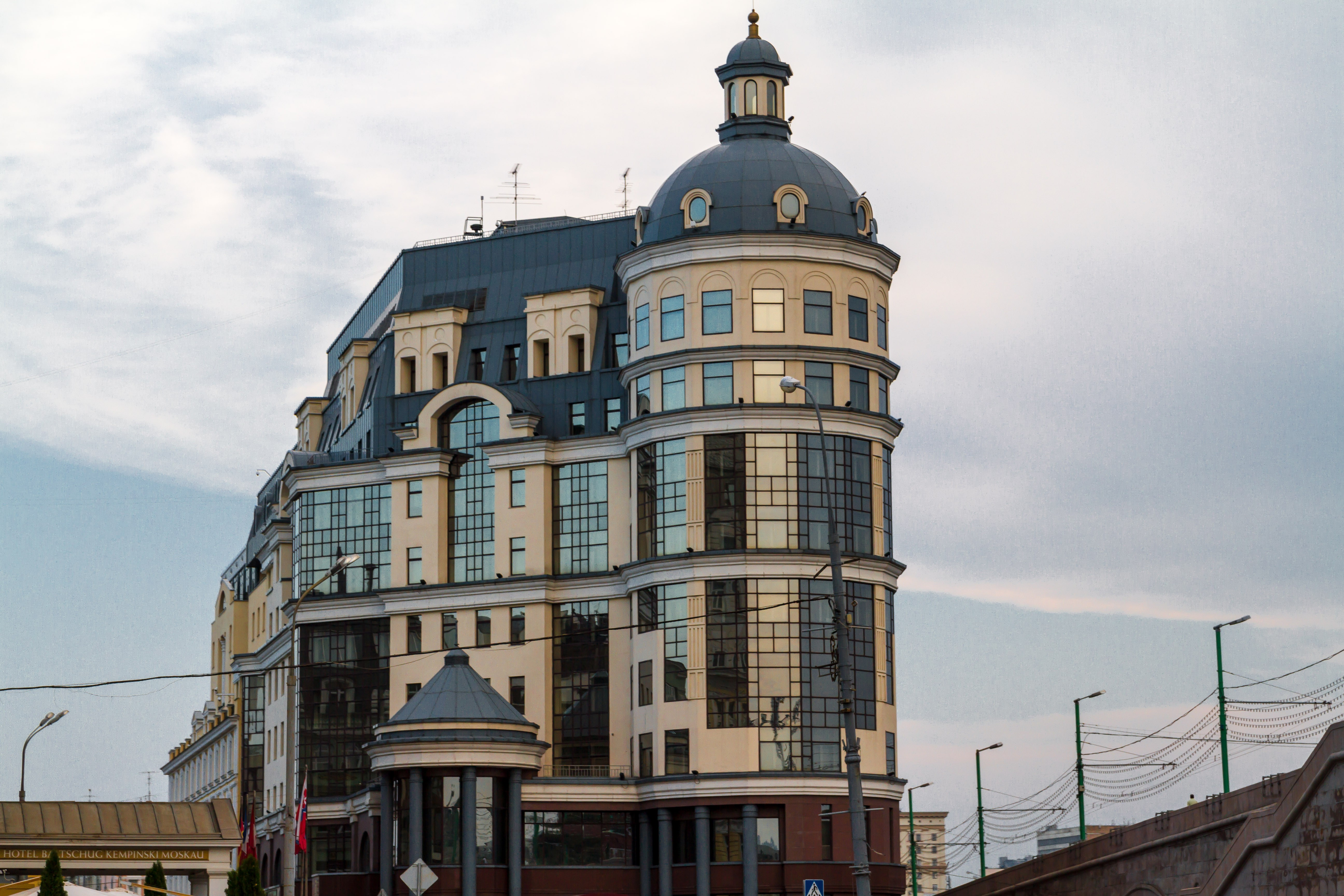
Main Directorate of the Bank of Russia for the Central Federal District

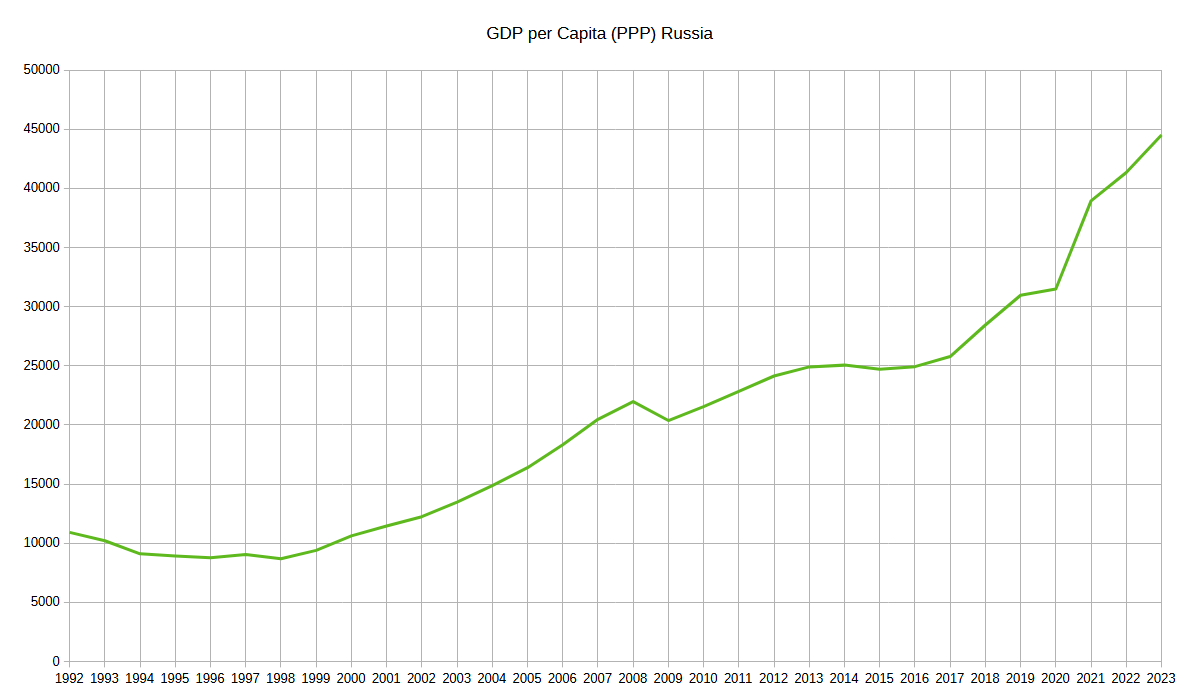
GDP per capita (PPP) in Russia, 1992–2023 (in international dollars)

Following the collapse of the Soviet Union, Russia underwent a radical transformation, moving from a centrally planned economy to a globally integrated market economy. Corrupt and haphazard privatization processes turned over major state-owned firms to politically connected "oligarchs", which has left equity ownership highly concentrated.

A cabinet led by President Boris Yeltsin in the place of a prime minister took office in November 1991 with a mandate to implement economic reforms. Deputy Prime Minister Yegor Gaidar led the reform program, which began on 2 January 1992 with the lifting of price controls, and caused an immediate increase in prices. Yeltsin's program of radical, market-oriented reform came to be known as a "shock therapy". It was based on the policies associated with the Washington Consensus, recommendations of the IMF and a group of top American economists, including Larry Summers who in 1994 urged for "the three '-ations'—privatization, stabilization, and liberalization" to be "completed as soon as possible."

Russian industry and society was not prepared for the change, and Yeltsin did not have control over the Russian Central Bank, which set monetary policy. As a result, monetary policy was poorly organized and coordinated. Russia experienced hyperinflation between 1992 and 1995. Prices increased by 300% in January 1992, and by as much as 1,000% in the first three months. The inflation rate was 2,509% for the year 1992, 840% for 1993, 215% for 1994, and 131% for 1995.

The results were disastrous: the jump in prices from shock therapy wiped out the modest savings accumulated by Russians under socialism and resulted in a regressive redistribution of wealth in favour of elites who owned non-monetary assets. Shock therapy was accompanied by a drop in the standard of living, including surging economic inequality and poverty, along with increased excess mortality and a decline in life expectancy. Russia suffered the largest peacetime rise in mortality ever experienced by an industrialized country. Likewise, the consumption of meat decreased: in 1990, an average citizen of the RSFSR consumed 63 kg of meat a year; by 1999, it had decreased to 45 kg. As of 1997, the number of people living in poverty had increased by fifteen times since 1990, with about half of the population below the poverty line.

The majority of state enterprises were privatized amid great controversy and subsequently came to be owned by insiders for far less than they were worth. For example, the director of a factory during the Soviet regime would often become the owner of the same enterprise. Under the government's cover, outrageous financial manipulations were performed that enriched a narrow group of individuals at key positions of business and government. Many of them promptly invested their newfound wealth abroad, producing an enormous capital flight. This rapid privatization of public assets, and the widespread corruption associated with it, became widely known throughout Russia as "prikhvatizatisiya," or "grab-itization."

Difficulties in collecting government revenues amid the collapsing economy and dependence on short-term borrowing to finance budget deficits led to the 1998 Russian financial crisis.

In the 1990s, Russia was a major borrower from the International Monetary Fund, with loan facilities totalling $20 billion. The IMF was criticised for lending so much, as Russia introduced little of the reforms promised for the money and a large part of these funds could have been "diverted from their intended purpose and included in the flows of capital that left the country illegally".

On 24 September 1993, at a meeting of the Commonwealth of Independent States (CIS) Council of Heads of State in Moscow, Azerbaijan, Armenia, Belarus, Kazakhstan, Kyrgyzstan, Moldova, Russia, Tajikistan, Uzbekistan signed the Treaty on the creation of an Economic Union which reinforces by an international agreement the intention to create an economic union through the step-by-step creation of a free trade area, a customs union and conditions for the free movement of goods, services, capital and labor. All these countries have ratified the Treaty and it entered into force on 14 January 1994. Turkmenistan and Georgia joined in 1994 and ratified the Treaty, but Georgia withdrew in 2009.

On 15 April 1994, at a meeting of the Commonwealth of Independent States (CIS) Council of Heads of State in Moscow, all 12 post-Soviet states signed the international Agreement on the Establishment of a Free Trade Area in order to move towards the creation of an economic union. Article 17 also confirmed the intention to conclude a free trade agreement in services. Article 1 indicated that this was "the first stage of the creation of the Economic Union", but in 1999 the countries agreed to remove this phrase from the agreement. Russia concluded bilateral free trade agreements with all CIS countries and did not switch to a multilateral free trade regime in 1999. Bilateral free trade agreements, except for Georgia, Azerbaijan and Turkmenistan (all of these are in force as of 2024), ceased to apply only after 2012 with Russia's accession to the new multilateral CIS free trade area.

Further integration took place outside the legal framework of the CIS. Pursuant to the Treaty on the creation of an Economic Union, the Agreement on the Customs Union between the Russian Federation and the Republic of Belarus was signed on 6 January 1995 in Minsk. The Government of the Republic of Belarus and the Government of the Russian Federation, on the one side, and the Government of the Republic of Kazakhstan, on the other side, signed an Agreement on the Customs Union in Moscow on 20 January 1995 in order to move towards the creation of an economic union as envisaged by the treaty. The implementation of these agreements made it possible to launch the Customs Union of the Eurasian Economic Community in 2010. As of 2025, according to the database of international treaties of the Eurasian Economic Union, these agreements are still in force and apply in part not contrary to the Treaty on the Eurasian Economic Union.

International agreements such as the following have further deepened trade and economic relations and integration with Belarus. The Community of Belarus and Russia was founded on 2 April 1996. The "Treaty on the Union between Belarus and Russia" was signed on 2 April 1997. And finally the Treaty on the Creation of a Union State of Russia and Belarus was signed on 8 December 1999.

=== Early success followed by Asian and domestic financial crisis (1997–1998) ===
In 1997, for the first time in many years, economic growth and low inflation were achieved. Russia had almost completed the main economic reforms necessary to complete the transition to a market economy, including the basic legislative framework, with the exception of macroeconomic stabilization. In 1997, the ruble was redenominated.

The poor situation on Asian international markets led to low oil prices, which, given the fixed and strong ruble exchange rate, did not allow for compensation for low tax collection within the country. The country's budget was not secured by revenues because the Soviet Union had virtually no taxes or fiscal system in the modern sense, which had to be created from scratch. Due to the almost fixed and strong ruble exchange rate, domestic producers suffered from cheap imports.

The combination of a large number of problems at once prevented the weak market economy from coping with the new challenges.

=== Recovery of domestic production, macroeconomic stabilization and de-bureaucratization reforms (1998–2004) ===
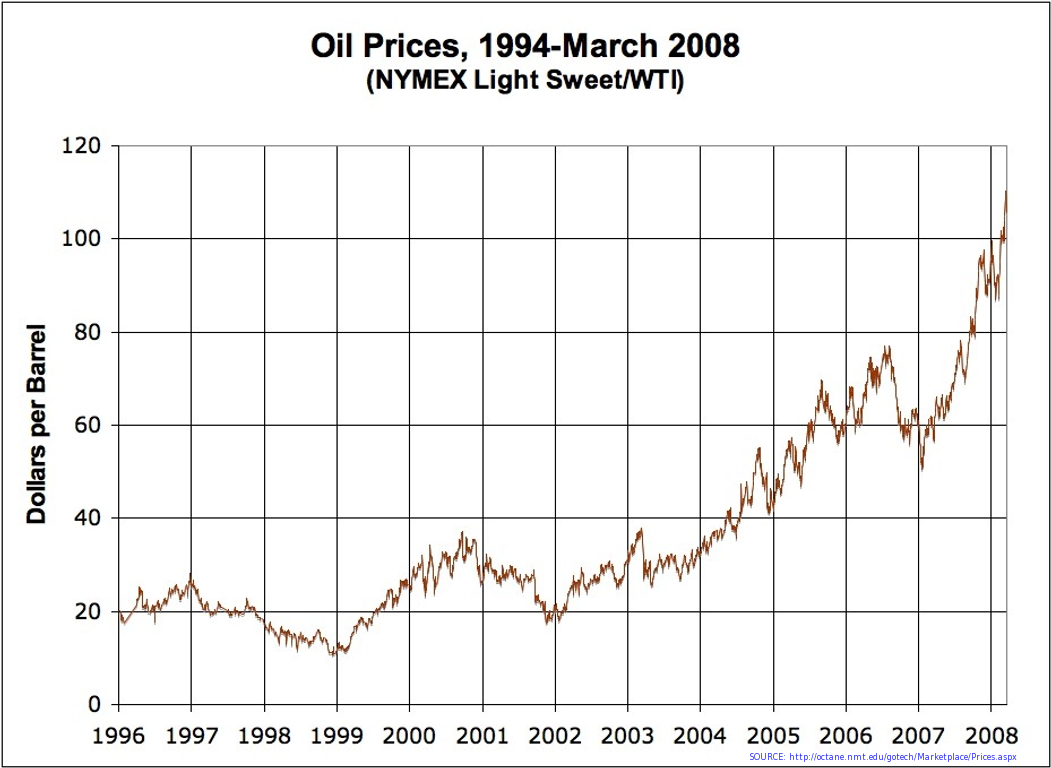
Price of oil in the 2000s

Between 2000 and 2002, significant pro-growth economic reforms included a comprehensive tax reform, which introduced a flat income tax of 13%; and a broad effort at deregulation which benefited small and medium-sized enterprises.

Between 2000 and 2008, Russian economy got a major boost from rising commodity prices. GDP grew on average 7% per year. Disposable incomes more than doubled and in dollar-denominated terms increased eightfold. The volume of consumer credit between 2000 and 2006 increased 45 times, fuelling a boom in private consumption. The number of people living below poverty line declined from 30% in 2000 to 14% in 2008.

=== Commodities boom, reserves, rise of consumer-driven economy and state corporations (2004–2008) ===
Russia repaid its borrowing of $3.3 billion from the IMF three years early in 2005.

Inflation remained a problem however, as the central bank aggressively expanded money supply to combat appreciation of the ruble. Nevertheless, in 2007 the World Bank declared that the Russian economy achieved "unprecedented macroeconomic stability". Until October 2007, Russia maintained impressive fiscal discipline with budget surpluses every year from 2000.

=== Modernization, regional and global integration and high-income economy (2009–2014) ===
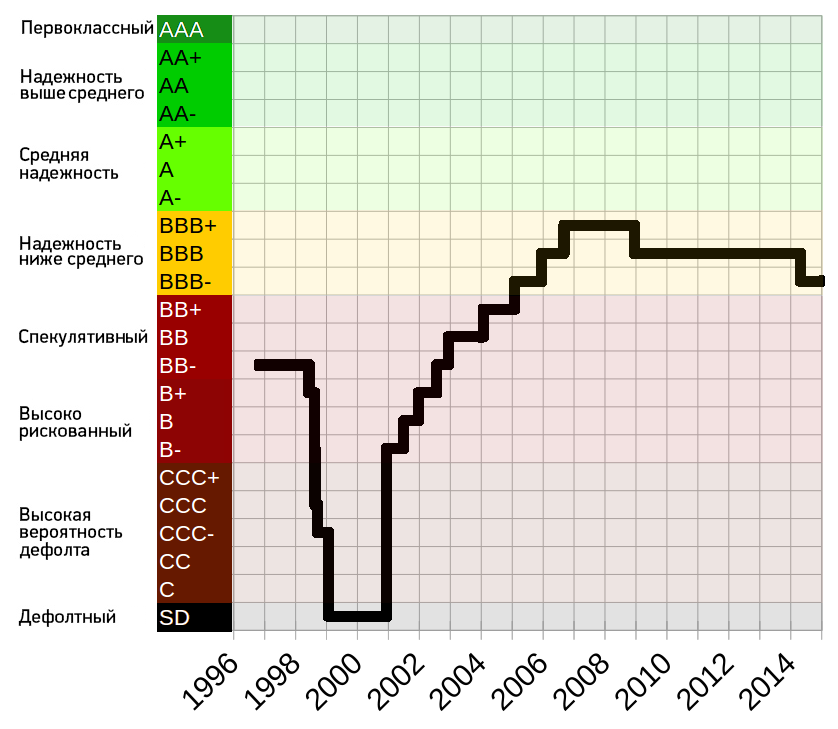
Changes in the credit rating (foreign) of Russia, Standard & Poor's

Russian banks were affected by the 2008 financial crisis, though no long term damage was done due to a proactive and timely response by the government and central bank. A sharp, but brief recession in Russia was followed by a strong recovery beginning in late 2009.

Between 2000 and 2012, Russia's energy exports fuelled a rapid growth in living standards, with real disposable income rising by 160%. In dollar-denominated terms this amounted to a more than sevenfold increase in disposable incomes since 2000. In the same period, unemployment and poverty more than halved and Russians' self-assessed life satisfaction also rose significantly. This growth was a combined result of the 2000s commodities boom, high oil prices, as well as prudent economic and fiscal policies. However, these gains have been distributed unevenly, as the 110 wealthiest individuals were found in a report by Credit Suisse to own 35% of all financial assets held by Russian households. Russia also has the second-largest volume of illicit money outflows, having lost over $880 billion between 2002 and 2011 in this way. Since 2008 Forbes has repeatedly named Moscow the "billionaire capital of the world".

In July 2010, Russia, together with Belarus and Kazakhstan, became a founding member of the Customs Union of the Eurasian Economic Community (EurAsEC), and the EurAsEC Single Economic Space, a common market of the same countries, came into force on 1 January 2012, superseding the bilateral agreements on free trade. At the same time Russia's membership to the WTO was accepted in 2011. Russia joined the World Trade Organization (WTO) on 22 August 2012 after 19 years of negotiations. On 20 September 2012, the multi-lateral Free Trade Area of the Commonwealth of Independent States (CIS FTA) came into force for Russia and subsequently superseded previous bilateral agreements among 9 participating post-Soviet states. In 2015, Russia became a founding member of the Eurasian Economic Union (EAEU), which replaced EurAsEC and envisaged a supranational economic union (the deepest stage of economic integration).

Rapid GDP and income growth continued until 2013. The most important topic of discussion in the economy for a decade was the middle-income trap. In 2013, the World Bank announced that Russia had graduated to a high-income economy based on the results of 2012 but in 2016 it was reclassified as an upper-middle income economy due to changes in the exchange rate of the Russian ruble, which is a floating currency. While the UN Human Development Index, which assesses progress in the standard of living, health and education, ranks Russia among the 'very high human development' countries.

Russian leaders repeatedly spoke of the need to diversify the economy away from its dependence on oil and gas and foster a high-technology sector. In 2012 oil, gas and petroleum products accounted for over 70% of total exports. This economic model appeared to show its limits, when after years of strong performance, the Russian economy expanded by a mere 1.3% in 2013. Several reasons were proposed to explain the slowdown, including a prolonged recession in the EU, which is Russia's largest trading partner, stagnant oil prices, lack of spare industrial capacity and demographic problems.

=== Conflicts with the West, income stagnation, import substitution programs and a pivot to the East (2014–2021) ===
Countries by natural gas proven reserves (2014), based on data from The World Factbook. Russia has the world's largest reserves.

Following the annexation of Crimea in March 2014 and Russia's involvement in the ongoing War in Donbas, the United States, the European Union, Canada, and Japan imposed sanctions on Russia.

According to the Russian economic ministry in July 2014, GDP growth in the first half of 2014 was 1%. The ministry projected growth of 0.5% for 2014. The Russian economy grew by a better than expected 0.6% in 2014. Russia was rated one of the most unequal of the world's major economies. Its social security system comprised roughly 16% of the total GDP in 2015.

As a result of the World Bank's designation of a high-income economy, Barack Obama issued a proclamation 9188: "I have determined that Russia is sufficiently advanced in economic development and improved in trade competitiveness that it is appropriate to terminate the designation of Russia as a beneficiary developing country effective October 3, 2014." U.S. Customs and Border Protection (CBP) indicated that Russia formally graduated from the GSP program on 4 October 2014.

As of 2015, real income was still lower for 99% of Russians than it was in 1991.

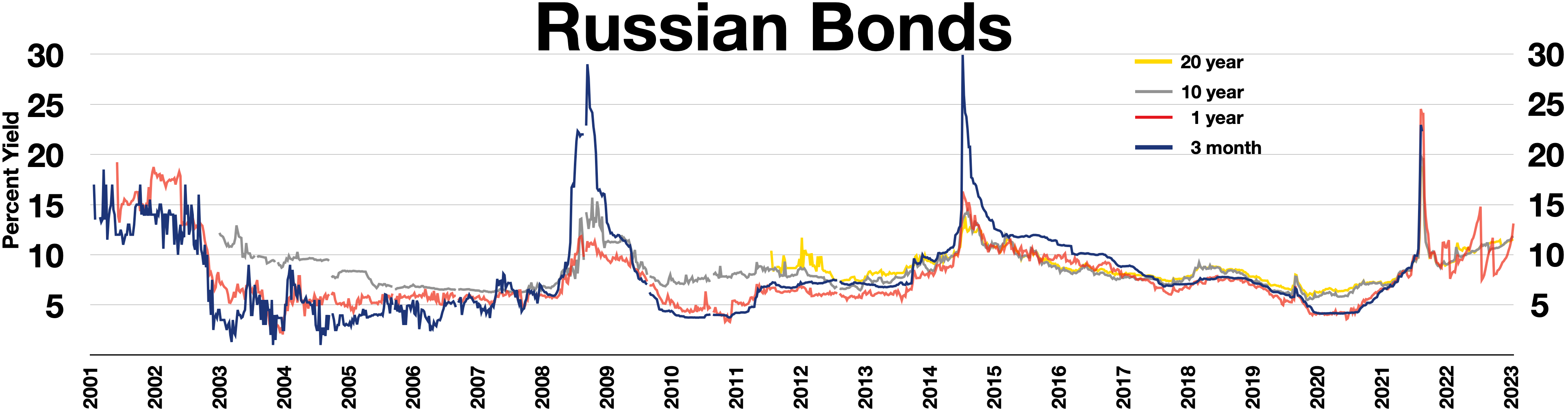
Russian bonds, Inverted yield curves to tame inflation during their wars (Russo-Georgian War, Russo-Ukrainian War, Russian invasion of Ukraine) 20-year bond 10-year bond 1-year bond 3-month bond

The Russian economy risked going into recession from early 2014, mainly due to falling oil prices, sanctions, and the subsequent capital flight. While in 2014 GDP growth remained positive at 0.6%, in 2015 the Russian economy shrunk by 3.7% and was expected to shrink further in 2016. By 2016, the Russian economy rebounded with 0.3% GDP growth and officially exited recession. The growth continued in 2017, with an increase of 1.5%.

In January 2016, Bloomberg rated Russia's economy as the 12th most innovative in the world, up from 14th in January 2015 and 18th in January 2014. Russia has the world's 15th highest patent application rate, the 8th highest concentration of high-tech public companies, such as internet and aerospace and the third highest graduation rate of scientists and engineers.

According to the British company BP (Statistical Yearbook 2018), proven oil reserves in Russia at the end of 2017 were 14.5 billion tonnes (14.3 billion long tons; 16.0 billion short tons), natural gas was 35 trillion cubic metres (1.2 quadrillion cubic feet). Gold reserves in Russia's subsoil, according to the U.S. Geological Survey, were 5,500 tonnes (5,400 long tons; 6,100 short tons) at the end of 2017.

In 2019, the Ministry of Natural Resources estimated the country's mineral reserves in physical terms. At the end of 2017, oil reserves were 9.04 billion tonnes (8.90 billion long tons; 9.96 billion short tons), gas reserves were 14.47 trillion cubic metres (511 trillion cubic feet), gold reserves were 1,407 tonnes (1,385 long tons; 1,551 short tons), and diamonds reserves were 375 million carats (75 tonnes). Then for the first time the Ministry evaluated the mineral reserves of Russia in terms of value. The value of oil reserves amounted to 39.6 trillion rubles, the value of gas amounted to 11.3 trillion rubles, coking coal amounted to almost 2 trillion rubles, iron ore amounted to 808 billion rubles, diamonds amounted to 505 billion rubles, gold amounted to 480 billion rubles. The combined value of all mineral and energy resources (oil, gas, gold, copper, iron ore, thermal and lignite coal, and diamonds) amounted to 55.24 trillion rubles (US$844 billion), or 60% of GDP for 2017. The assessment occurred after the adoption of a new classification of reserves in Russia and the object of the methodology was only those fields for which a license was issued, so the assessment of the Ministry of Natural Resources is less than the total volume of explored reserves. Experts criticized such "an unsuccessful attempt to estimate reserves," pointing out that "one should not take such an estimate seriously" and "the form contains an incorrect formula for calculating the value".

In the International Comparison Program 2021, the Commonwealth of Independent States (CIS) region was linked through the standard global core list approach, unlike in ICP 2017. Based on the results, the World Bank announced that in 2021 Russia was the 4th largest economy in the world ($5.7 trillion and 3.8 percent of the world) and the largest economy in Europe and Central Asia when measured in PPP terms.

=== Breaking ties with the West, developing regional pan-Eurasian cooperation, tech sovereignty and self-sufficiency efforts (2022–present) ===
In 2022, heavy sanctions were enacted due to the Russian invasion of Ukraine which will likely result in a steep recession. Since early 2022, many official economic statistics have not been published. Sanctions also included asset freezes on the Russian Central Bank, which holds $630 billion in foreign-exchange reserves, to prevent it from offsetting the effects of sanctions.

On 7 March 2022, the Government of Russia in the first time approved a list of foreign states and territories that commit unfriendly acts against Russia, its legal entities and individuals. The Russian Federation believes that the countries that have restricted trade with Russia have directly violated the rules of the World Trade Organization. Russia distributed a statement to members of the organization, and the World Trade Organization published it on its website. In accordance with paragraph 2 of Article 40 of the Treaty on the Eurasian Economic Union, Russian Prime Minister Mikhail Mishustin has imposed increased tariffs on goods from unfriendly countries. A duty of 35% is imposed on imports of personal hygiene items, incense and weapons from unfriendly countries. The list includes shampoos and other hair products, individual deodorants and antiperspirants, products for aromatizing indoor air, detergents and cleaning products. The full list of goods subject to import duties of 20-50% from unfriendly countries is established by the government decree No. 2240 of 7 December 2022, which has been amended several times in 2023–2025.

According to most estimates, every day of the war in Ukraine costs Russia $500 million to $1 billion. In 2022, Russia defaulted on part of its foreign currency, its first such default since 1918.

In November 2022, it was reported that Russia had officially entered a recession as the Federal State Statistics Service had reported a national GDP loss for the second consecutive quarter.

As part of the sanctions imposed on Russia, on 2 September 2022, the finance ministers of the G7 group agreed to cap the price of Russian oil and petroleum products, designed to allow Russia to maintain production, but limiting revenue from oil sales.

In 2022, The Economist calculated that Russia did graduate into the category of high-income economies by 2022, if counted at purchasing power parity rather than the exchange rate but could fall below the threshold due to the invasion of Ukraine. In December 2022, a study at Bank of Russia's Research and Forecasting Department, found that the import dependence of the Russian economy is relatively low, does not exceed the median for other countries, and the share of imports in most industries is lower than in other countries. The key explanation for this could be the low involvement of the Russian economy in global value supply chains and its focus on production of raw materials. However, 60% of Russia's imports come from the countries that have announced sanctions against Russia.

TASS reported poor results for the Russian economy the first quarter of 2023 with revenue of 5.7 trillion roubles – down 21% (mainly due to falling oil revenue), expenditure 8.1 trillion roubles – up 34% (mainly due to increased military costs), creating a deficit 2.4 trillion roubles – ($29.4 billion)

Following Central Bank of Russia interventions, the exchange rate of the rouble against the dollar remained relatively stable in 2022, although in 2023 it started to decrease significantly, reaching RUB 97 per US$1 on 15 August 2023. Both the interventions and the exchange rate decrease resulted in significant criticism of the Central Bank by Russian state propaganda. Quarter 2 of 2023 saw a 13% fall in the value of the rouble against the dollar and a current account surplus estimated in to be falling by 80% from the annual 2022 surplus of $233 billion.

After 11 years of negotiations, on 8 June 2023, in Sochi, Armenia, Belarus, Kazakhstan, Kyrgyzstan, Russia, Tajikistan and Uzbekistan signed the Commonwealth of Independent States Agreement on Free Trade in Services, Establishment, Operations and Investment to partly integrate Uzbekistan and Tajikistan on the common standards of the WTO (General Agreement on Trade in Services) and the EAEU (some provisions were borrowed from EAEU law) even without their membership in the WTO (Uzbekistan) or the EAEU (Uzbekistan and Tajikistan).

On 19 June 2023, Lavrov stated that the Great Eurasian Partnership had become Russia's flagship project.

In August and September 2023, the Central Bank of Russia started raising the key lending rate, ending up at 13% in September, while USD to RUB exchange rate remained at RUB 95. As of June 2023 share of Russia's exports to EU dropped to 1.7% while Russia's imports from EU dropped to 1.5%. In October 2023 the "psychological barrier" of RUB 100 per US$1 was crossed. In July 2024 the Russian Central Bank raised the key interest rate to 18%.

Russia's ranking as Europe's largest economy in terms of PPP and the world's fourth largest economy was first released in May 2024. In July 2024, the World Bank again reclassified Russia as a high-income economy based on 2023 results.

The 2024 budget expects revenues of 35 trillion rubles ($349 billion) with expenditure of 36.6 trillion, based on a Urals oil forecast of $71.30 per barrel, a 90.1 rubles to US$1 exchange rate and inflation of 4.5%. Defence spending will double to 10.78 trillion, 29.4% of expenditure. Russia currently has a record low unemployment rate of just 3 percent, due to a demographic decline, demands of the war for industrial and military manpower, and large scale emigration.

In January 2025, it was reported that Russia had used a two-prong strategy to finance the large costs of the Russo-Ukrainian war since early 2022. In addition to the official Russian government defense budget—direct financial expenditure for waging the war was estimated at US$250 billion through June 2024, rising to over 20% of annual GDP—an off-budget financing mechanism was employed to fund the war with over US$200 billion from preferential bank loans made to defence contractors and war-related businesses, loans compelled by the Russian government. Defense and security spending accounted for approximately 40% of Russia's total government spending in 2025, exceeding combined spending on education, healthcare, social policy and the national economy.

Despite experiencing significant expansions in both 2023 and 2024, analysts have warned that the Russian economy risks stagnation in 2025 and onward due to labor shortages, high inflation, military overspending, falling resource prices and a dwindling National Wealth Fund.

The Iran-EAEU FTA came into force on 15 May 2025. The Mongolia-EAEU Interim free trade in goods agreement signed on 27 June 2025. The United Arab Emirates-EAEU free trade in goods agreement signed on 27 June 2025.

On 7 August 2025, Russia signed a free trade agreement in services and investments with the UAE.

== Data ==
Original data are obtained and published in the national currency of the Russian Federation, the Russian ruble, by the Federal State Statistics Service Rosstat, as well as other organizations of which Russia is a member, such as the Eurasian Economic Commission and the Statistical Committee of the Commonwealth of Independent States. Due to the conversion of values into other currencies, the volume in other nominal currencies may fluctuate sharply. The average annual exchange rate of the ruble is usually used to convert annual data. The World Bank uses the Atlas method (a three-year average) to estimate GNI. Purchasing power parities is calculated as part of the successive cycles of the World Bank's International Comparison Program and comes into effect after several years (ICP 2021 data were published in May 2024 and applies by the World Bank since July 2024 and by the IMF since October 2024).

The following table shows the main economic indicators in 1990–2024 and future estimates (indicated *) by the IMF.

Year	GDP (in billion int$ PPP)	GDP per capita (in int$ PPP)	GDP (in billion US$ nominal)	GDP per capita (in US$ nominal)	GDP growth (real, originally prices are in Russian rubles)	Inflation rate (in Per cent)	Unemployment (in Per cent)	Government debt (in % of GDP)
1990	n/a	12,760	n/a	n/a	n/a	n/a	n/a	n/a
1991	n/a	▼12,490	n/a	n/a	n/a	n/a	n/a	n/a
1992	1,621.277	▼10,914.894	71.603	482.052	n/a	n/a	5.2%	n/a
1993	▼1,515.308	▼10,206.910	▲196.227	▲1,321.756	▼-8.700%	▲874.3%	▲5.9%	n/a
1994	▼1,351.113	▼9,104.043	▲293.768	▲1,979.465	▼-12.700%	▼307.5%	▲8.1%	n/a
1995	▼1,322.881	▼8,915.733	▲335.777	▲2,263.016	▼-4.100%	▼197.3%	▲8.3%	n/a
1996	▼1,298.858	▼8,766.589	▲412.685	▲2,785.404	▼-3.581%	▼47.8%	▲9.3%	n/a
1997	▲1,339.434	▲9,055.431	▲433.704	▲2,932.113	▲1.376%	▼14.8%	▲10.8%	51.519%
1998	▼1,282.445	▼8,684.472	▼287.672	▼1,948.059	▼-5.319%	▲27.7%	▲11.9%	▲135.193%
1999	▲1,383.147	▲9,395.419	▼209.657	▼1,424.156	▲6.347%	▲85.7%	▲13.0%	▼92.379%
2000	▲1,556.696	▲10,618.878	▲278.264	▲1,898.155	▲10.054%	▼20.8%	▼10.6%	▼55.868%
2001	▲1,672.634	▲11,458.280	▲328.475	▲2,250.201	▲5.082%	▲21.5%	▼8.9%	▼44.438%
2002	▲1,779.247	▲12,244.827	▲370.062	▲2,546.779	▲4.746%	▼15.8%	▼8.0%	▼37.577%
2003	▲1,947.833	▲13,465.930	▲461.518	▲3,190.609	▲7.356%	▼13.7%	▲8.2%	▼28.334%
2004	▲2,143.132	▲14,875.940	▲633.294	▲4,395.830	▲7.145%	▼10.9%	▼7.7%	▼20.828%
2005	▲2,351.723	▲16,386.143	▲817.717	▲5,697.621	▲6.397%	▲12.7%	▼7.2%	▼14.851%
2006	▲2,622.193	▲18,330.602	▲1,060.901	▲7,416.297	▲8.165%	▼9.7%	▼7.1%	▼9.804%
2007	▲2,923.515	▲20,472.076	▲1,393.416	▲9,757.472	▲8.550%	▼9.0%	▼6.0%	▼8.033%
2008	▲3,136.188	▲21,971.026	▲1,779.109	▲12,463.807	▲5.247%	▲14.1%	▲6.2%	▼7.446%
2009	▼2,908.738	▼20,371.457	▼1,307.927	▼9,160.112	▼-7.821%	▼11.6%	▲8.2%	▲9.918%
2010	▲3,076.938	▲21,539.793	▲1,633.111	▲11,432.428	▲4.512%	▼6.8%	▼7.4%	▲10.105%
2011	▲3,265.874	▲22,835.402	▲2,046.621	▲14,310.233	▲3.995%	▲8.4%	▼6.5%	▲10.340%
2012	▲3,460.550	▲24,135.854	▲2,191.486	▲15,284.673	▲4.024%	▼5.1%	▼5.5%	▲11.167%
2013	▲3,581.230	▲24,903.206	▲2,288.428	▲15,913.302	▲1.755%	▲6.8%	5.5%	▲12.348%
2014	▲3,670.432	▲25,052.774	▼2,048.837	▼13,984.474	▲0.736%	▲7.8%	▼5.2%	▲15.136%
2015	▼3,631.416	▼24,709.731	▼1,356.703	▼9,231.599	▼-1.973%	▲15.5%	▲5.6%	▲15.286%
2016	▲3,673.023	▲24,921.954	▼1,280.648	▼8,689.368	▲0.194%	▼7.0%	▼5.5%	▼14.849%
2017	▲3,807.099	▲25,777.812	▲1,575.140	▲10,665.247	▲1.827%	▼3.7%	▼5.2%	▼14.311%
2018	▲4,205.230	▲28,448.510	▲1,653.005	▲11,182.629	▲2.806%	▼2.9%	▼4.8%	▼13.620%
2019	▲4,579.554	▲30,963.855	▲1,695.724	▲11,465.343	▲2.198%	▲4.470%	▼4.600%	▲13.748%
2020	▲4,651.430	▲31,490.815	▼1,488.118	▼10,074.759	▼-2.654%	▼3.382%	▲5.767%	▲19.156%
2021	▲5,688.268	▲38,638.428	▲1,828.927	▲12,423.263	▲5.866%	▲6.694%	▼4.833%	▼16.524%
2022	▲6,006.308	▲40,938.963	▲2,295.527	▲15,646.297	▼-1.436%	▲13.750%	▼3.950%	▲18.480%
2023	▲6,476.516	▲44,269.007	▼2,059.762	▼14,079.116	▲4.083%	▼5.859%	▼3.167%	▲19.487%
2024	▲6,905.073	▲47,269.220	▲2,161.205	▲14,794.697	▲4.100%	▲8.444%	▼2.516%	▲20.303%
2025*	7,191.718	49,382.880	2,076.396	14,257.845	1.456%	9.265%	2.777%	21.383%
2026*	7,412.470	51,064.384	2,085.148	14,364.549	0.865%	5.492%	3.539%	22.547%
2027*	7,631.910	52,753.122	2,153.274	14,883.813	1.100	4.000%	4.088	23.660

== Currency and monetary policy ==
On 25 December 1993, the Constitution of the Russian Federation came into force, where the main provisions were prescribed in the Article 75. The currency in the Russian Federation is the ruble. Monetary emission is carried out exclusively by the Central Bank of the Russian Federation (the Bank of Russia). The introduction and emission of other money in the Russian Federation is not allowed. The protection and ensuring the stability of the ruble is the main function of the Central Bank of the Russian Federation, which it carries out independently of other government bodies. On 1 September 2013, the Bank of Russia also became a regulator of financial markets, applying the integrated model of financial sector supervision.

The Central Bank of the Russian Federation follows inflation targeting policy. Higher inflation than in developed countries has remained throughout the last 25–30 post-Soviet years and the devaluation of the currency (in relation to foreign currencies and in relation to domestic goods) is significantly compensated by higher interest rates and an increase in nominal incomes and assets. This situation is typical for developing markets. Typically devaluations of the ruble relative to foreign currency strongly stimulate the export-oriented economy of Russia.

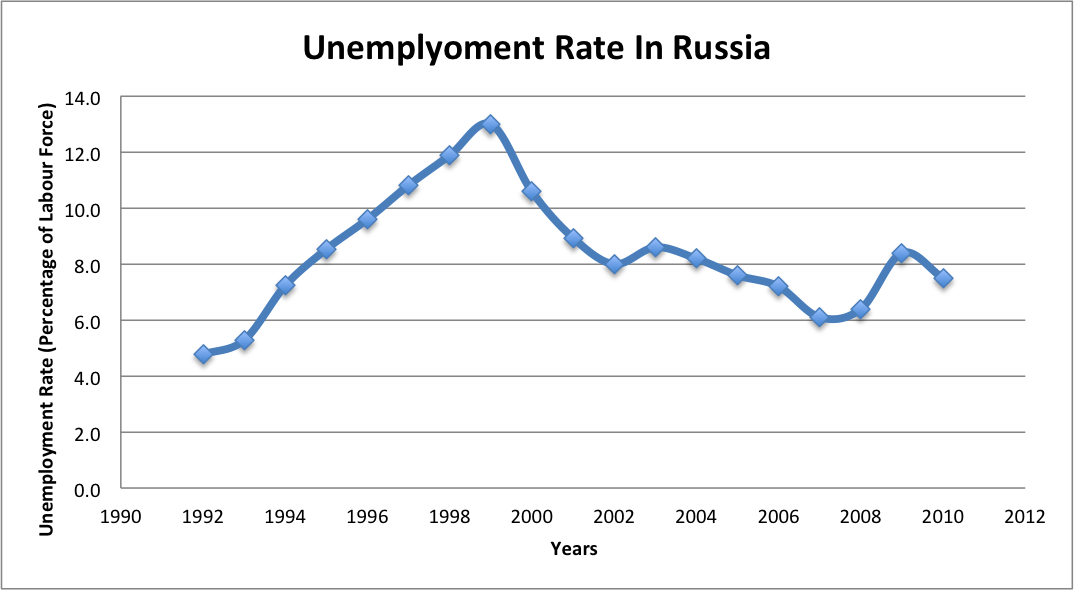
Unemployment rate of Russia since the fall of the Soviet Union

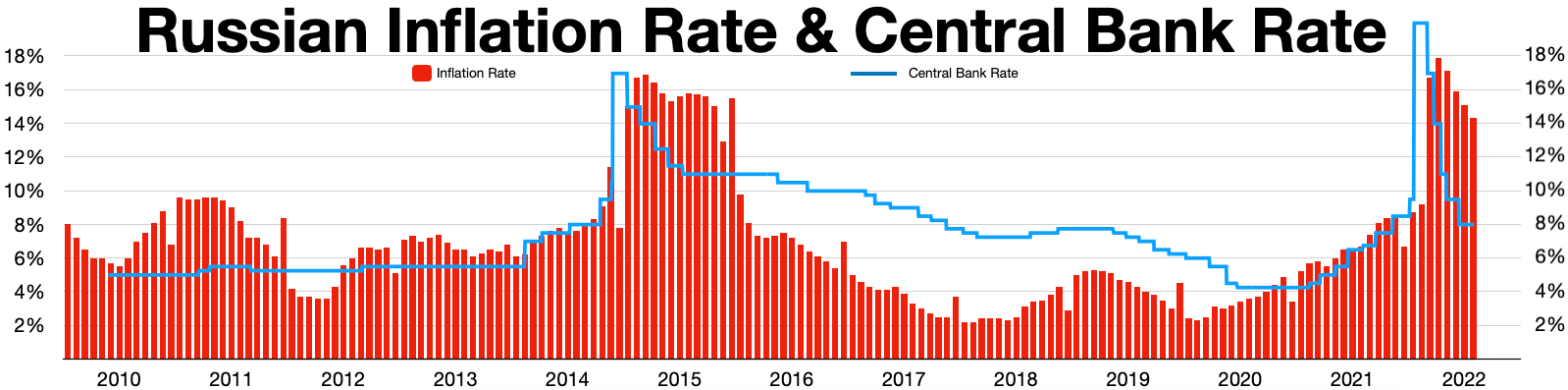
Russian inflation rate 2012–2022

=== Foreign exchange rate ===
The currency exchange rate of the Russian ruble is floating.

In 2011, the Bank of Russia, which was then headed by Sergei Ignatiev, took a course towards abolishing the currency corridor and designated a transition to a floating exchange rate for the ruble. Already under the new head of the Central Bank of the Russian Federation, Elvira Nabiullina, it was planned to complete the transition to a floating exchange rate regime from 1 January 2015. The Bank of Russia dismantled the currency corridor two months earlier - on 10 November 2014, so as not to waste gold and foreign exchange reserves.

Ruble's Real Effective Exchange Rate remained in 2022–25 higher and stronger than in 1994 and 1998 when the sharp devaluations happened relative to the foreign currency.

The Russian ruble is a freely convertible currency, and Russia allows the free movement of capital in Russian rubles. Within the common market of the Commonwealth of Independent States, the single market of the Eurasian Economic Union, and on the basis of bilateral agreements with other countries, the free movement of capital, payments and the free convertibility of the Russian ruble are ensured.

=== Banking and payment system ===
Russia built its banking system from scratch and created one of the most advanced banking systems in the world.

From 2010 to 2018, the number of cashless card transactions in Russia increased by 30 times. At the same time, Russia became the world leader in the number of secure tokenized transactions which was called the "Russian miracle", according to the Boston Consulting Group (BCG). With tokenization, the card number is not stored on a mobile device, on the smartphone manufacturer's servers, or at the merchant. The adoption of contactless payments and mobile payments (Apple Pay, Samsung Pay) has also been more successful in Russia than anywhere else in the world. In 2020, Mark Barnett, President of Mastercard Europe, noted that Russia is one of the most advanced and developed payment markets in Europe. In 2020, the "Russian miracle" continued, as the pandemic gave a boost to the development of digital technologies. Russia ranked fourth in the global ranking of countries whose population actively abandoned cash in favor of cashless payments during the pandemic.

Sberbank became the world's leader in terms of the number of transactions processed in 2024 in the ranking compiled by the Nilson analytical agency. Over the year, the number of transactions conducted by Sberbank exceeded 52 billion, surpassing the American companies JPMorgan Chase and Worldpay. In October 2025, Governor Elvira Nabiullina announced that cashless payments accounted for 87.5% of Russia's retail turnover in the first quarter.

As of 1 January 2025 the Russia's national payments system comprises 28 payment systems, 354 money transfer operators.

The Bank of Russia's payment system (in Russian rubles) is an integral part of the national payment system. Funds transfers are carried out by the Bank of Russia through urgent funds transfers, non-urgent funds transfers and the Faster Payment System ( instant 24/7 payments for work, goods, and services, including transactions made via QR code, mobile phone number and NFC). The Faster Payments System (SBP) was launched in 2019. In 2014, the Bank of Russia established the National Payment Card System Joint Stock Company (NSPK) that launched Mir payment system cards. NSPK also processes domestic payments made in Russia with cards of international payment systems.

The System for Transfer of Financial Messages for non-Ruble transfers only within Russia (and also outside of Russia) is an equivalent of the SWIFT financial transfer system. Both systems only transmit text messages. Settlements are made individually between credit institutions within the framework of correspondent relations.

== Public policy ==
=== Federal, regional and municipal budgets ===
The federal budget of Russia (Russian: федеральный бюджет России) is the leading element of the budget system of Russia. It is a major state financial plan for the fiscal year, which has the force of law after its approval by the Russian parliament and signed into law by the President of Russia.

The federal budget is the primary means of redistribution of national income and gross domestic product through it mobilized the financial resources necessary to regulate the country's economic development, social policy and the strengthening of the national defense. The share of federal budget accounts for a significant portion of the distribution process, which is the allocation of funds between sectors of the economy, manufacturing and industrial areas, regions of the country.

The right of the Russian Federation for an independent federal budget is enshrined by Article 71 of the Russian Constitution and the Budget Code of Russia that regulates the details of its formation and execution.

=== Fiscal policy ===
Russia was estimated to have a government budget deficit of 2.6% of GDP in 2025, due to falling oil revenue and high military expenditure.

=== Debts ===
Russia is a creditor country. As the IMF reported in 2016, Russia has a floating exchange rate, large official foreign exchange reserves, a positive net international investment position of about 20 percent of GDP, and a current account surplus. As reported in 2017, despite the low level of foreign direct investment (FDI) and capital market investments, Russia has been a net creditor for most of the last 25 years. As of 2022, Russia is a net creditor on international markets: the value of its foreign assets exceeds the value of its foreign liabilities. Russia has a positive net international investment position (NIIP) from December 2013 to September 2024.

Russia has one of the lowest government debts (total external and domestic) and lowest external debts (total public/government and private) among world's economies.

In 2022, domestic government debt increased by 13.9 percent to 18.78 billion rubles. Russia Domestic government Debt data was reported at RUB 19,801.921 billion in May 2023.

In 2022, the share of external debt to GDP was 17%, decreasing from 26.3% in 2021. Russia's external debt was estimated at 381.8 billion U.S. dollars as of 1 January 2023, down 20.8 percent from the previous year. Russia External Debt reached US$357.9 billion in March 2023, compared with US$380.5 billion in the previous quarter.

=== National wealth fund ===
On 1 January 2004, the Government of Russia established the Stabilization fund of the Russian Federation as part of the federal budget to balance it if price of oil falls. On 1 February 2008, the Stabilization fund was divided into two parts. The first is a reserve fund equal to 10% of GDP and was to be invested in a similar way as the Stabilization Fund. The second is the National Welfare Fund of the Russian Federation to be invested in more risky instruments, including some shares in domestic and foreign companies. The Reserve fund which started with $125 billion was exhausted by 2017 and discontinued. The National Wealth Fund had started with $32 billion in 2008 and by August 2022, peaked at $201 billion. December 2023 saw it fall to $133 billion with liquid assets also down at $56 billion.

=== Corruption ===
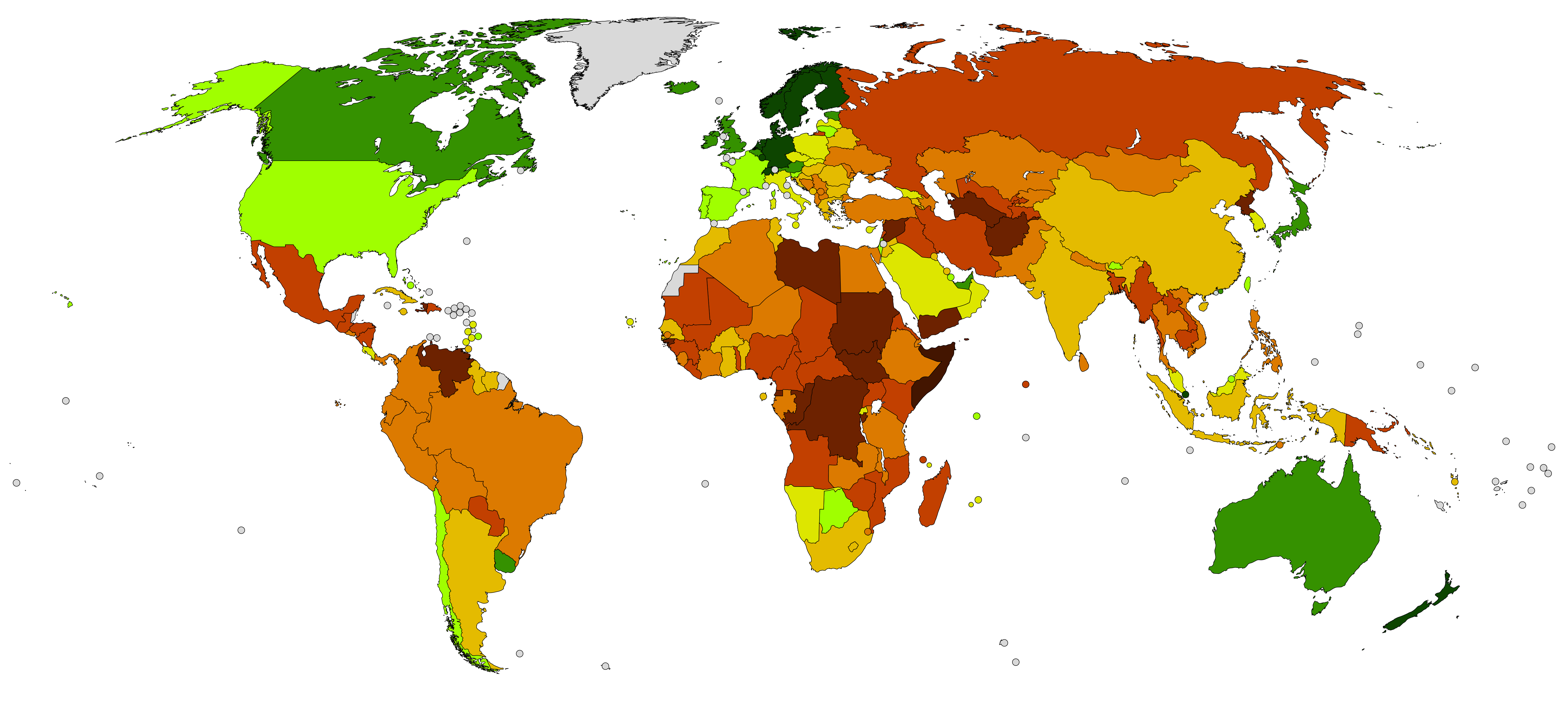
Corruption Perceptions Index by Transparency International, 2019

Russia was the lowest rated European country in Transparency International's Corruption Perceptions Index for 2025; ranking 157th out of 181 countries. Corruption is perceived as a significant problem in Russia, affecting various aspects of life, including the economy, business, public administration, law enforcement, healthcare, and education. The phenomenon of corruption is strongly established in the historical model of public governance in Russia and attributed to general weakness of rule of law in Russia. As of 2020, the percentage of business owners who distrust law enforcement agencies rose to 70% (from 45% in 2017); 75% don't believe in impartiality of courts and 79% do not believe that legal institutions protect them from abuse of law such as racketeering or arrest on dubious grounds.

== Income inequality ==
In Russia, areas where income is higher have increased air pollution. However while income may have been higher in these regions a greater disparity in income inequality was found. It was discovered that "greater income inequality within a region is associated with more pollution, implying that it is not only the level of income that matters but also its distribution". In Russia areas lacking in hospital beds suffer from greater air pollution than areas with higher numbers of beds per capita which implies that the poor or inadequate distribution of public services also may add to the environmental inequality of that region.

== Regional economies and economic regions ==
=== Federal subjects ===
According to the Moscow Government, the Moscow economy is the largest among the Russian Federation constituent entities: the capital accounts for one fifth of the country's total gross regional product. Moscow is one of the largest urban economies in the world in terms of GDP (purchasing power parity, PPP) and one of the top 5 global megalopolises according to this value. The Moscow GDP (PPP) in 2021 amounted to US$25.500 billion, which is more than that of Seoul, Shanghai or Paris. The government refers to Oxford Economics stating that Moscow ranked third among the world's cities in terms of GDP at purchasing power parity in 2020.

According to statements by the Mayor of Moscow in 2024, Moscow contributed more than 20 per cent of the country's GDP. This contribution is related to innovation, IT sector and services. Labour productivity in Moscow is on average 2.5 times higher than in Russia due to the high concentration of residents.

In May 2025, Mayor Sobyanin reported to President Putin that Moscow's gross regional product at purchasing power parity for 2024 had grown to int$ 1.39 trillion, allowing the Russian capital to rank second among the world's largest urban economies, second only to New York and ahead of Shanghai. "In 2020, we were in fifth place and since 2023, we have moved up to second place," said the mayor of Moscow.

Moscow is home to 90 billionaires in 2025 – 16 more than a year ago. Moscow comes in second place behind New York City according to Forbes.

=== Groupings ===
Russia is divided into twelve economic regions.

- Central Black Earth Economic Region
- Central Economic Region
- East Siberian Economic Region
- Far Eastern Economic Region
- Kaliningrad Economic Region
- North Caucasus Economic Region
- Northern Economic Region
- Northwestern Economic Region
- Ural Economic Region
- Volga Economic Region
- Volga-Vyatka Economic Region
- West Siberian Economic Region

In 2018, the Russian Ministry of Economic Development developed a strategy for the spatial development of Russia, in which it was proposed to introduce the division into 14 macro-regions. In February 2019, the strategy was approved and the division into 12 macro-regions was implemented.

There are also macrozones such as the Baikal Amur Mainline economic zone.

=== Centre-periphery model ===
According to a 2011 research article, the nature of the relationship between the centre and the regions in Russia today corresponds to the so-called "centre-periphery" model; excessive centralisation, the absence of alternative (to Moscow) centres in the country's territorial structure and weak horizontal links are stable characteristics of the Russian political and economic space and are constantly reproduced over time.

More than a decade ago, Professor Natalia Zubarevich proposed an extension of the centre-periphery model and is known as the author of the "theory of four Russias". According to Zubarevich, the different speed of social modernisation is more accurately explained by the centre-periphery model. The entire population of the country can be divided into three roughly equal parts - about a third of citizens in each. The underdeveloped republics, where 6% of the country's population lives - this "fourth" Russia has its own specific features. According to the concept, "First Russia" is the cities with millions of inhabitants, i.e. the most modernised and economically developed territories. "Second Russia" are medium-sized cities with a pronounced industrial profile. "Third Russia" - small towns, workers' settlements, rural areas. Compared to "first" and "second Russia" - this is a deep periphery in terms of the quality of socio-economic life. The "fourth Russia" is made up of the national republics of the Caucasus, as well as the south of Siberia (Tuva, the Altai Republic). These territories also represent a periphery, but a specific one: the demographic transition has not been completed here, urbanisation is in its infancy, and patriarchal-clan principles are still strong in society.

Monoprofile towns (monotowns) are the most unstable part of the "second Russia".

== Sectors ==
=== Primary ===
==== Energy ====
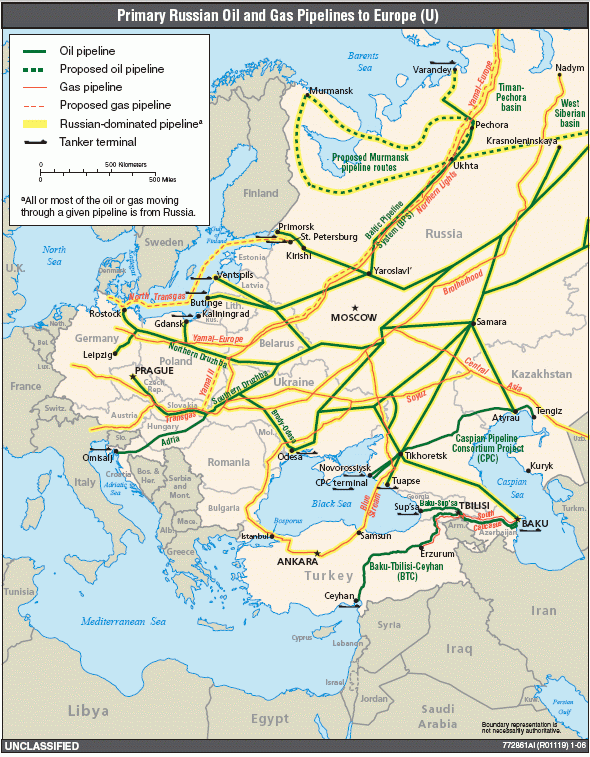
Until 2022, Russia was a key oil and gas supplier to much of Europe.

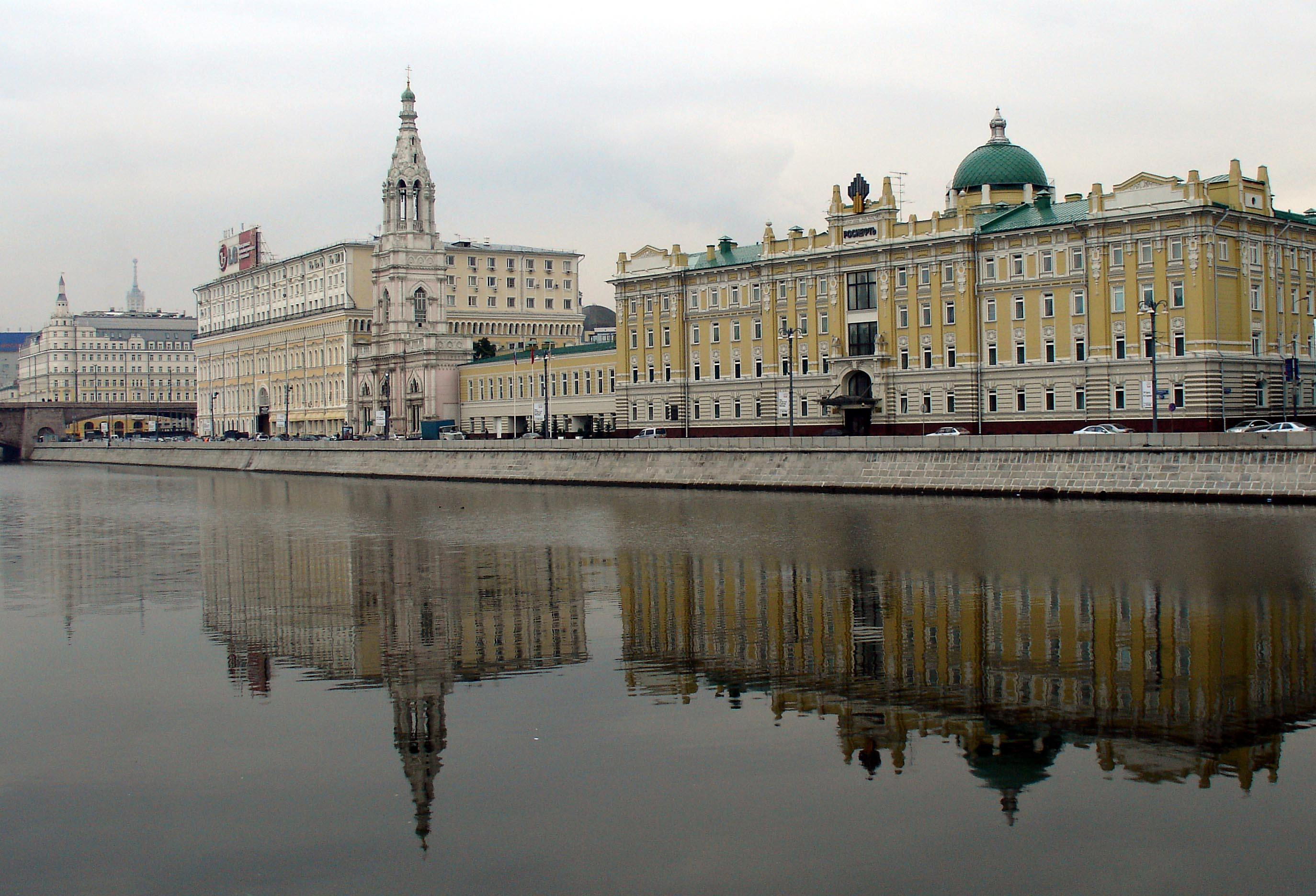
Rosneft headquarters on the bank of the Moskva River, Moscow

The mineral-packed Ural Mountains and the vast fossil fuel (oil, gas, coal), and timber reserves of Siberia and the Russian Far East make Russia rich in natural resources, which dominate Russian exports. Oil and gas exports, specifically, continue to be the main source of hard currency.

Russia has been widely described as an energy superpower; as it has the world's largest natural gas reserves, the second-largest coal reserves, the eighth-largest oil reserves, and the largest oil shale reserves in Europe. It is the second-largest natural gas producer and natural gas exporter, the second-largest oil exporter and oil producer, and the third largest coal exporter. Fossil fuels cause most of the greenhouse gas emissions by Russia. The country was the world's fourth-largest electricity producer, and the ninth-largest renewable energy producer in 2019. Russia was also the world's first country to develop civilian nuclear power, and built the world's first nuclear power plant. In 2019, It was the world's fourth-largest nuclear energy producer. After the collapse of the Soviet Union, the Russian state nuclear conglomerate Rosatom became the dominant actor in international nuclear power markets, training experts, constructing nuclear power plants, supplying fuel and taking care of spent fuel in around the world. Whereas oil and gas were subject to international sanctions after Russia's full-scale invasion of Ukraine in February 2023, its nuclear industry was not targeted by sanctions.

In the mid-2000s, the share of the oil and gas sector in GDP was around 20%, and in 2013 it was 20–21% of GDP. The share of oil and gas in Russia's exports (about 50%) and federal budget revenues (about 50%) is large, and the dynamics of Russia's GDP are highly dependent on oil and gas prices, but the share in GDP is much less than 50%. According to the first such comprehensive assessment published by the Russian statistics agency Rosstat in 2021, the maximum total share of the oil and gas sector in Russia's GDP, including extraction, refining, transport, sale of oil and gas, all goods and services used, and all supporting activities, amounted to 16.9% in 2017, 21.1% in 2018, 19.2% in 2019 and 15.2% in 2020. To compare the data obtained using the same methodology, the source provides data for other countries. This is more than the share of GDP in the United States (8%) and Canada (less 10%). This is comparable to the share of GDP in Norway (14%) and Kazakhstan (13.3%). It is much lower than the share of GDP in the United Arab Emirates (30%) and Saudi Arabia (50%). This assessment did not include, for example, the production of used pumps or specialized education, which should have been included, according to experts. Russia participates in the OPEC+ cartel.

Russia consumes domestically two-thirds of its gas production and a quarter of its oil production while it sells three-quarters of its oil on the world market and Russia's share of the traded world oil market is 17.5% - more than Saudi Arabia's. At the same time, experts note that there are formal and informal part of the rent and the total oil and gas rent in 2023 can be estimated at 24% of Russia's GDP. Michael Alexeyev (son of Lyudmila Alexeyeva), a professor of economics at Indiana University, notes that the oil and gas taxes reported by the government do not include corporate dividends and the so-called indirect or additional revenues derived from the expenditure of oil and gas rents in the economy. There is also such an indicator as the oil rent (% of GDP), which is published by the World Bank. It is 9.7% for Russia, 14.8% for Kazakhstan, 6.1% for Norway, 23.7% for Saudi Arabia, 15.7% for the United Arab Emirates, 2.8% for Canada and 0.6% for the United States.

2023 saw a fall in Russia's oil and gas tax revenues of 24% to 8.8 trillion roubles ($99.4 billion) compared to 2022.

As of September 2025, Ukrainian drone and missile strikes have disrupted nearly 40% of Russia's oil refining capacity, forcing Moscow to import gasoline from Asian nations and creating widespread fuel shortages across multiple Russian regions. The sustained campaign has knocked approximately 338,000 tons per day of crude oil processing offline, with over 20 regions experiencing shortages and gas stations implementing fuel rationing measures.

In September 2025 the International Energy Agency stated that Russia's revenues from oil product exports had in August declined to five-year lows, contributing to Russia's economic slowdown.

==== Mining ====
Russia is also a leading producer and exporter of minerals and gold. Russia is the largest diamond-producing country in the world, estimated to produce over 33 million carats in 2013, or 25% of global output valued at over $3.4 billion, with state-owned ALROSA accounting for approximately 95% of all Russian production.

In 2019, the country was the 3rd world producer of gold; 2nd worldwide producer of platinum; 4th worldwide producer of silver; 9th largest world producer of copper; 3rd largest world producer of nickel; 6th largest world producer of lead; 9th largest world producer of bauxite; 10th largest world producer of zinc; 2nd worldwide producer of vanadium; 2nd largest world producer of cobalt; 5th largest world producer of iron ore; 7th largest world producer of boron; 9th largest world producer of molybdenum; 13th largest world producer of tin; 3rd largest world producer of sulfur; 4th largest world producer of phosphate; 8th largest world producer of gypsum; in addition to being the world's 10th largest producer of salt. It was the world's 6th largest producer of uranium in 2018.

==== Agriculture, fishing and forestry ====
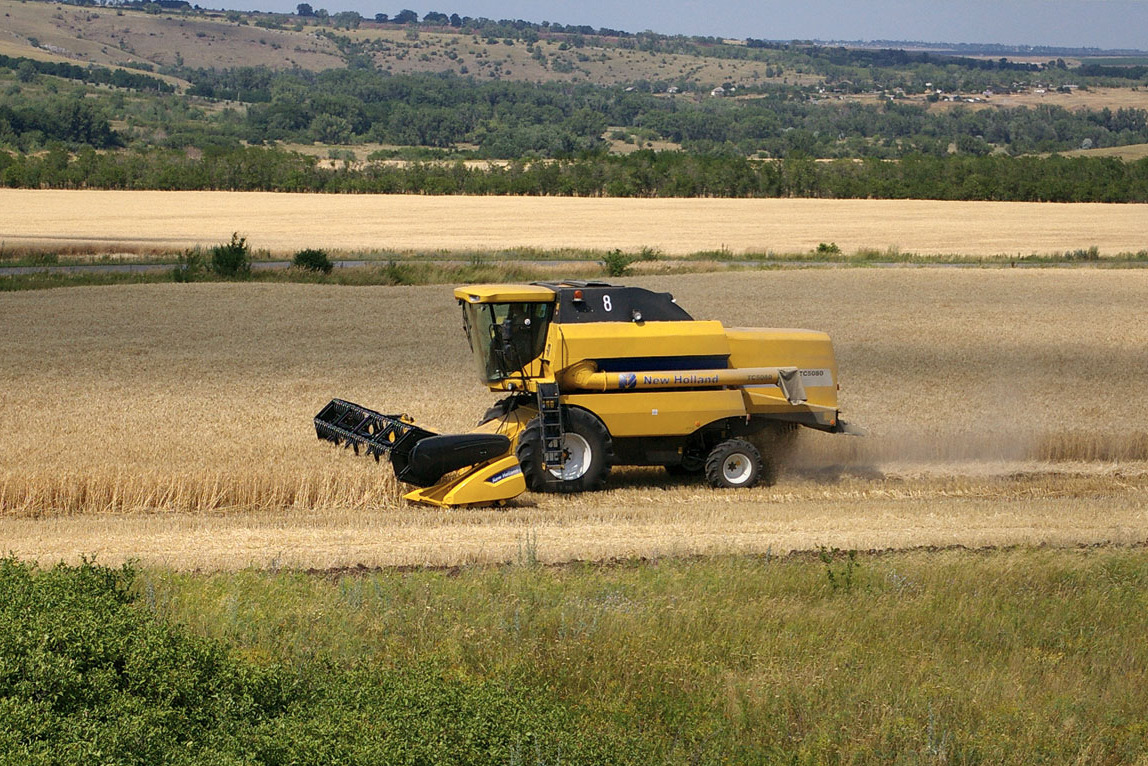
A combine harvester in Rostov Oblast

Russia's agriculture sector contributes about 5% of the country's total GDP, although the sector employs about one-eighth of the total labour force. It has the world's third-largest cultivated area, at 1,265,267 square kilometres (488,522 sq mi). However, due to the harshness of its environment, about 13.1% of its land is agricultural, and only 7.4% of its land is arable. The main product of Russian farming has always been grain, which occupies considerably more than half of the cropland. Russia is the world's largest exporter of wheat, and is the largest producer of barley, buckwheat, oats, and rye, and the second-largest producer of sunflower seed. Various analysts of climate change adaptation foresee large opportunities for Russian agriculture during the rest of the 21st century as arability increases in Siberia, which would lead to both internal and external migration to the region.

More than one-third of the sown area is devoted to fodder crops, and the remaining farmland is devoted to industrial crops, vegetables, and fruits. Owing to its large coastline along three oceans, Russia maintains one of the world's largest fishing fleets, ranking sixth in the world in tonnage of fish caught; capturing 4.77 million tonnes (4.69 million long tons; 5.26 million short tons) of fish in 2018. It is also home to the world's finest caviar (the beluga), and produces about one-third of all canned fish, and some one-fourth of the world's total fresh and frozen fish.

=== Industry ===
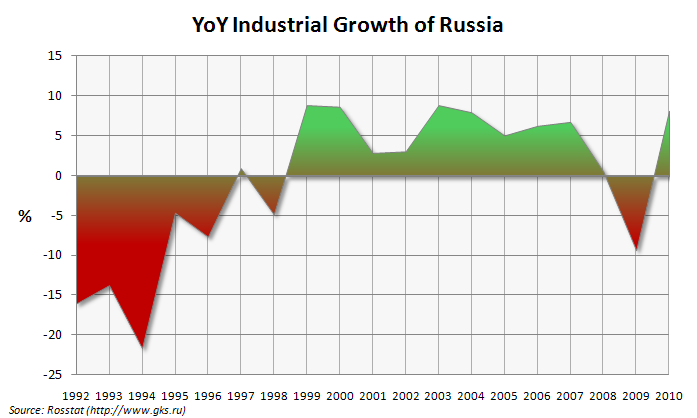
Russia's industrial growth per year (%), 1992–2010

==== Defense ====
Russia has a war economy. The defense industry of Russia is a strategically important sector and a large employer in the country. Russia has a large and sophisticated arms industry, capable of designing and manufacturing high-tech military equipment, including a fifth-generation fighter jet, nuclear powered submarines, firearms, and short range/long range ballistic missiles.

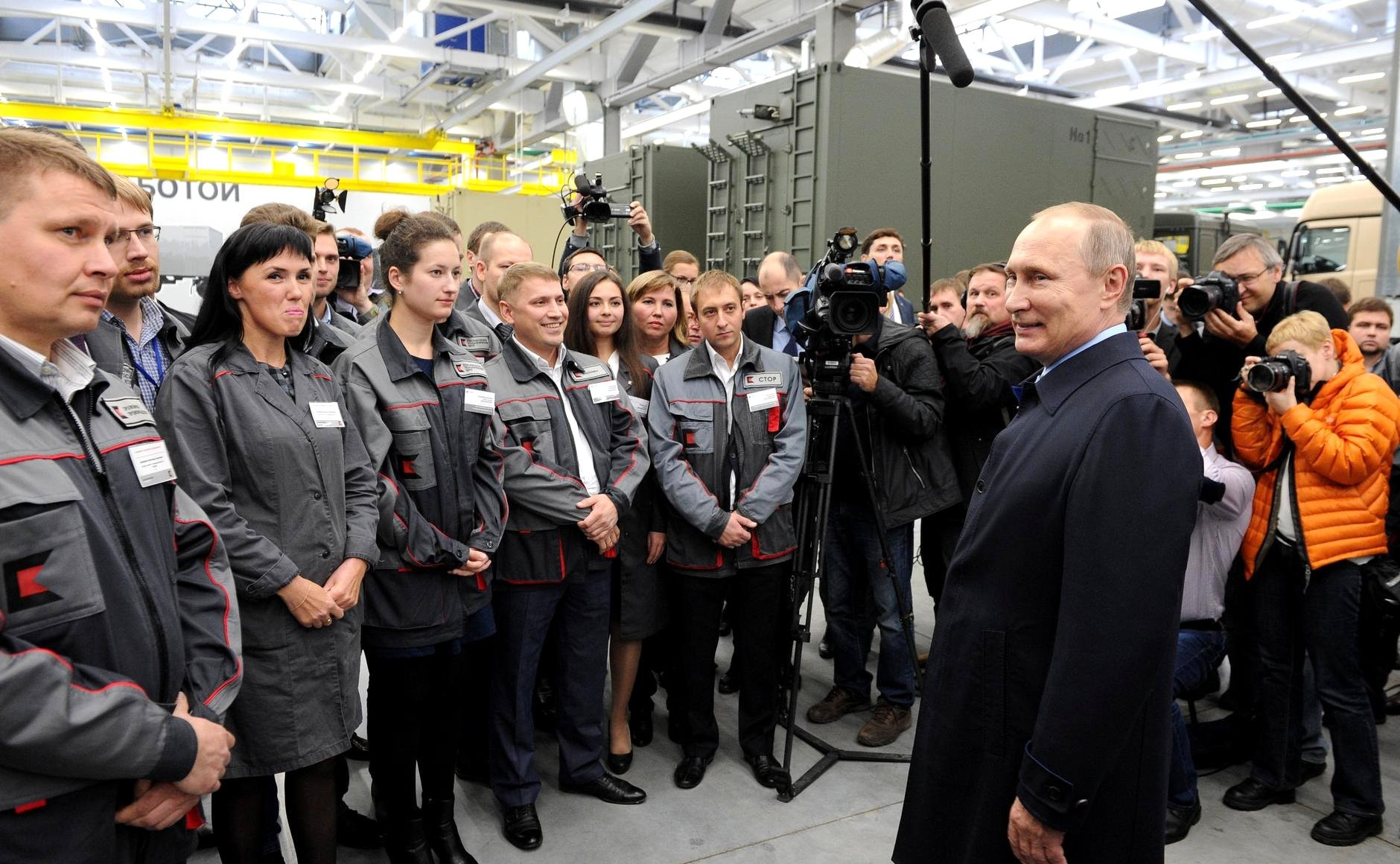
President Vladimir Putin meeting with workers of Kalashnikov Concern (2016)

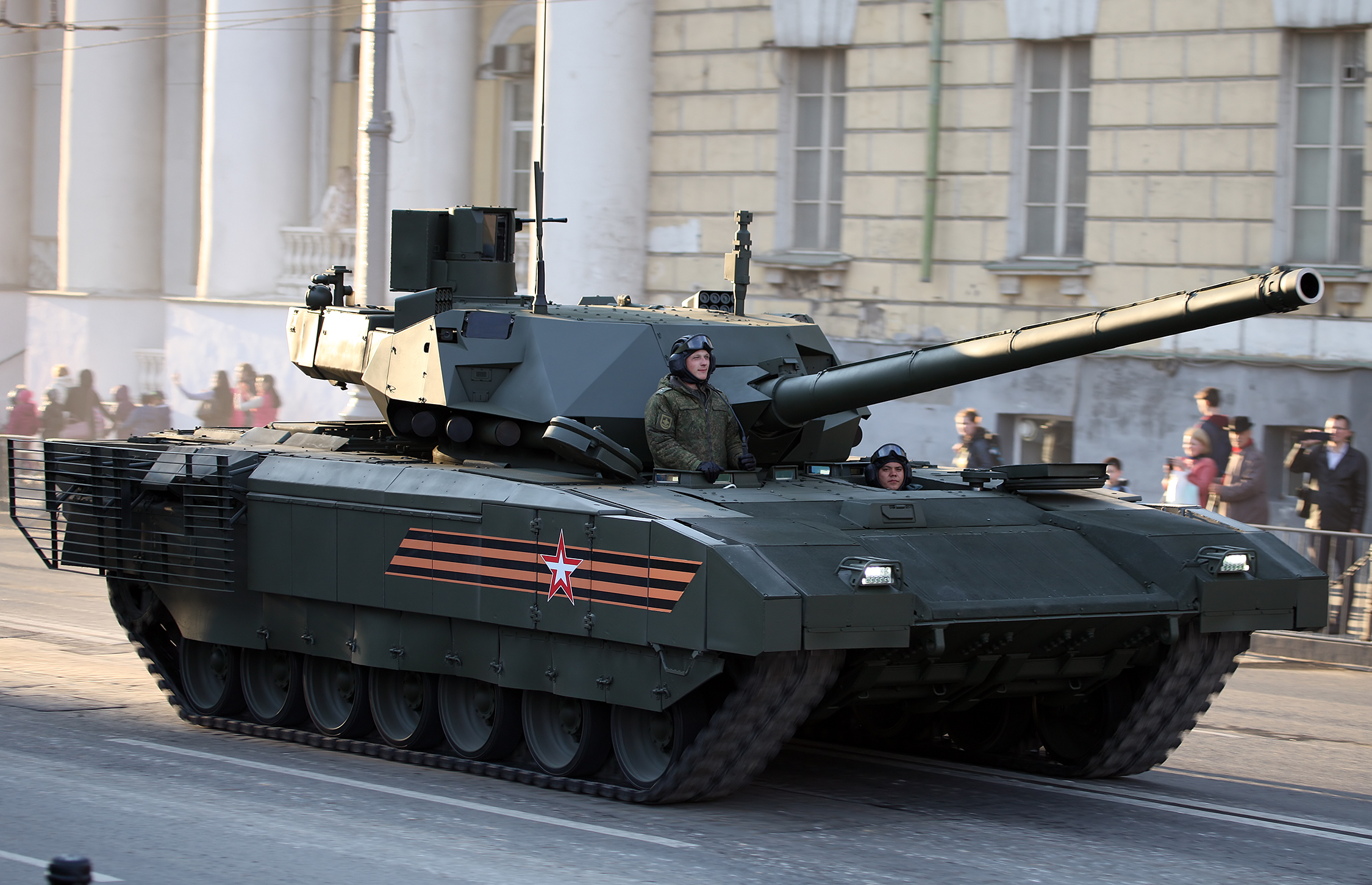
A view of T-14 Armata tank

==== Aerospace ====
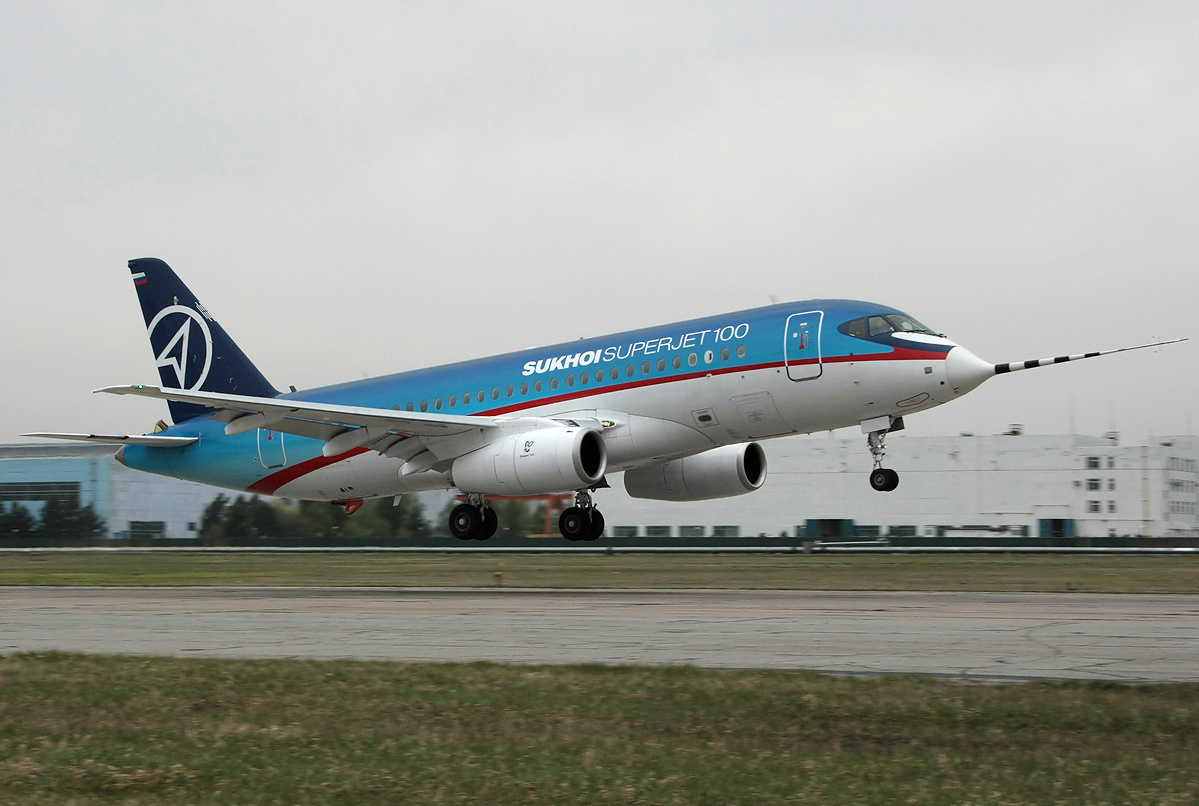
The Sukhoi Superjet 100 is one of Russia's most recent civilian aviation products. The regional passenger plane was ordered around 280 times for various airlines and leasing companies as of 2018.

Aircraft manufacturing is an important industry sector in Russia, employing around 355,300 people. The Russian aircraft industry offers a portfolio of internationally competitive military aircraft such as MiG-29 and Su-30, while new projects such as the Sukhoi Superjet 100 are hoped to revive the fortunes of the civilian aircraft segment. In 2009, companies belonging to the United Aircraft Corporation delivered 95 new fixed-wing aircraft to its customers, including 15 civilian models. In addition, the industry produced over 141 helicopters. It is one of the most science-intensive hi-tech sectors and employs the largest number of skilled personnel. The production and value of the military aircraft branch far outstrips other defence industry sectors, and aircraft products make up more than half of the country's arms exports.

The Space industry of Russia consists of over 100 companies and employs 250,000 people.

==== Automotive ====
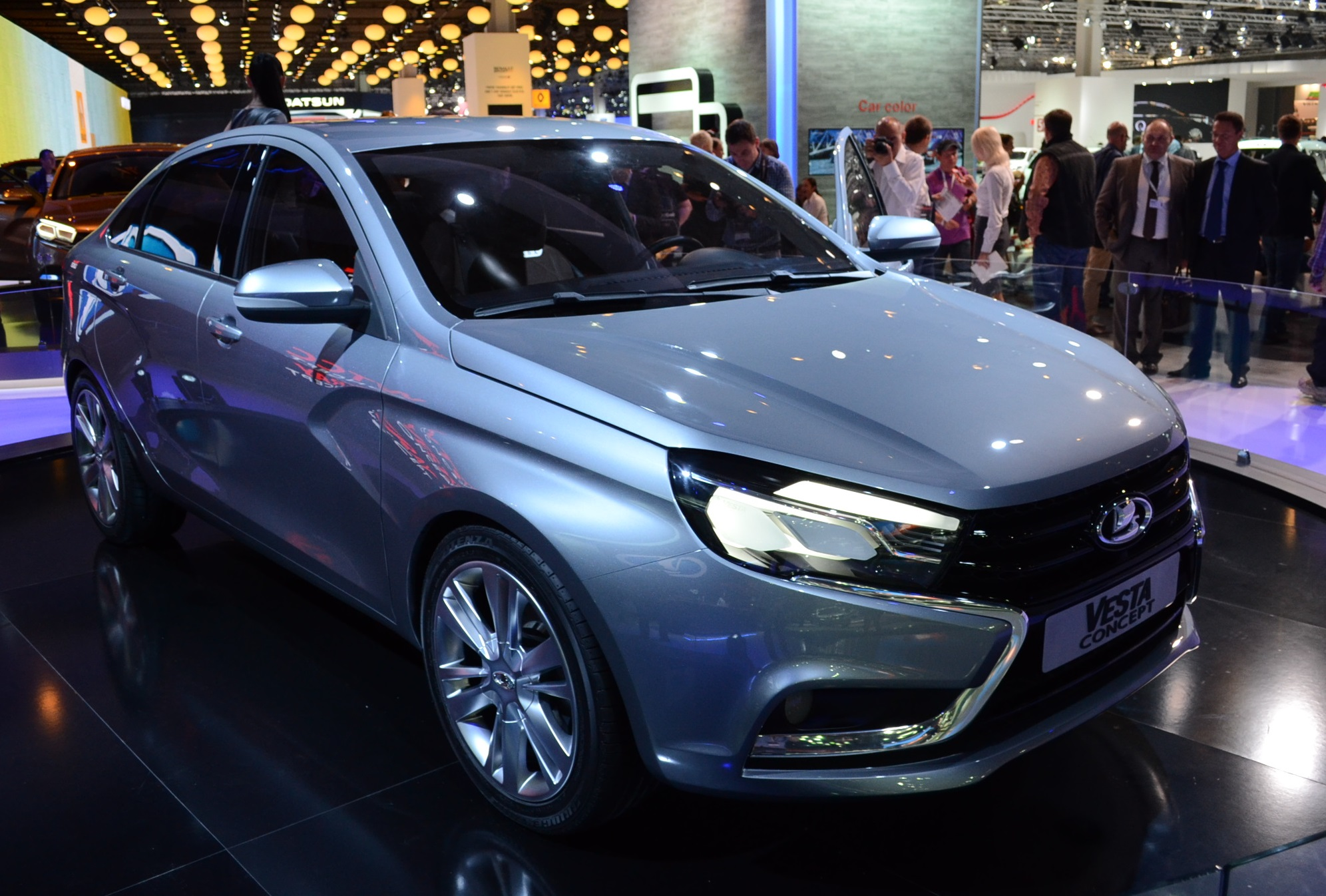
Lada is a brand of AvtoVAZ, the largest Russian car manufacturer in the Russian automotive industry.

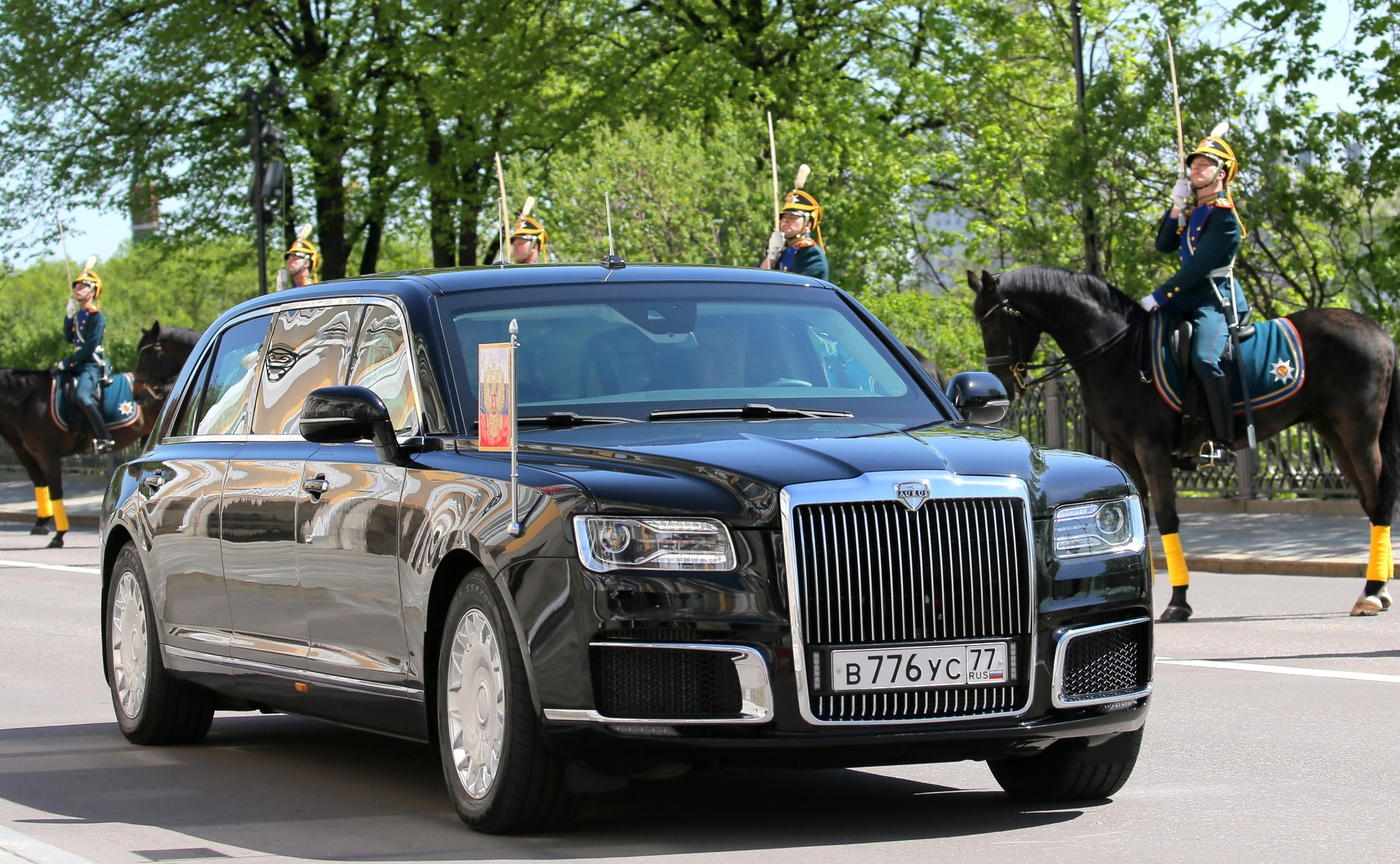
Aurus Senat, a recent armoured limousine project by NAMI

Following the 2022 sanctions and the withdrawal of Western manufacturers the production dropped to 450,000 passenger cars in 2022, the lowest level since the dissolution of the Soviet Union in 1991. The main local brands are light vehicle producers AvtoVAZ and GAZ, while KamAZ is the leading heavy vehicle producer. In December 2022 the only foreign car manufacturers are eleven Chinese carmakers that have production operations or are constructing their plants in Russia.

==== Chemical ====
The Russian chemical industry is a branch of Russian industry.

The chemical industry's share of Russia's GDP in 2006 was about 6% of exports.

In 2009 it exported 3.1 million tons of ammonia in the amount of 626 million dollars, 814 thousand tons of methanol in the amount of 156 million dollars, 22 million tons of mineral fertilizers worth $5.6 billion, 702 thousand tons of synthetic rubber in the amount of 1, $2 billion.

The average monthly wage in the chemical industry in March 2010 was 21956 RUR / month. The Russian chemical industry was facing problems in 2014 due to the sanctions imposed on Russia by Western nations.

==== Electronics ====
Russia was experiencing a regrowth of microelectronics, with the revival of JCS Mikron until sanctions took effect in 2022.

==== Food manufacturing ====
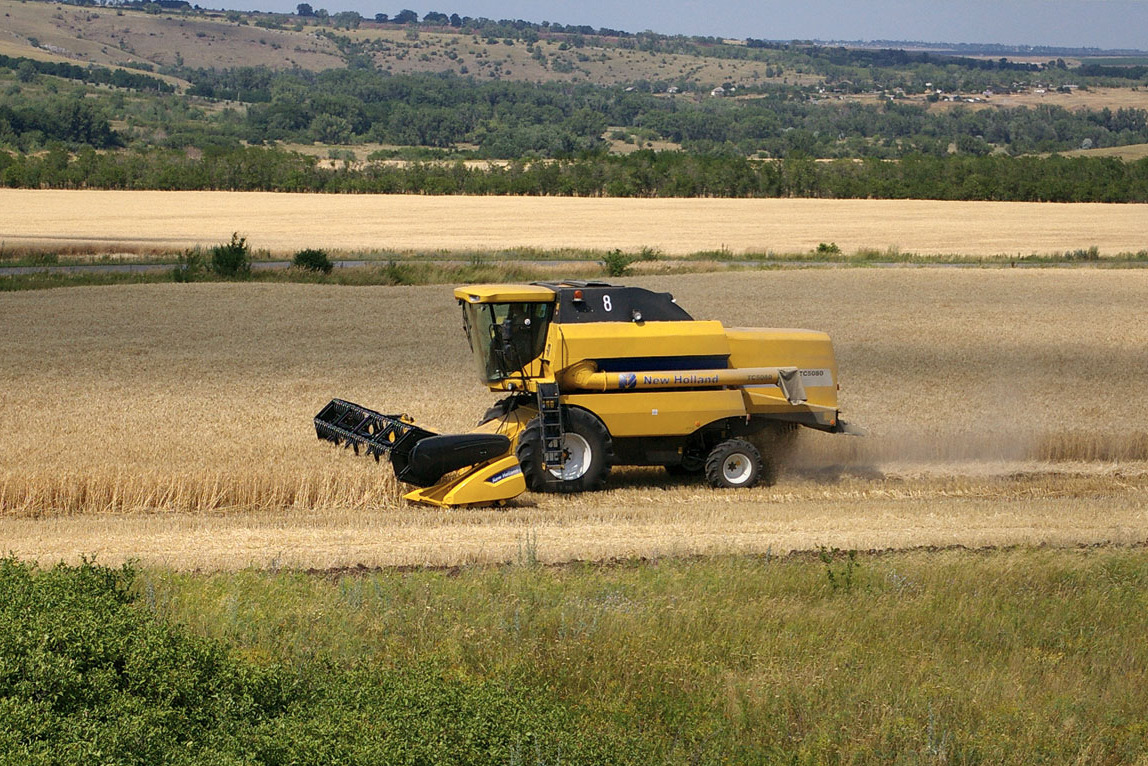
Wheat harvesting in Rostov Oblast

The food industry in Russia is a significant sector in the economy of Russia.

The volume of production in the manufacture of food products and tobacco - 3.12 trillion rubles (in 2010), including:

- Food production - 2.952 trillion rubles;
- Manufacture of tobacco products - 164 billion rubles.

As of 2020, Russia faces problems of over-nutrition with over 23% of the adults obese and over 57% overweight. Under 2.5% of the population suffer from undernourishment. Russia has formulated a Development of Healthy Lifestyle policy covering the years 2017 to 2025.

==== Pharmaceutical ====
The pharmaceutical industry in Russia had a turnover of $16.5 billion in 2016, which was equal to 1.3 % of GDP and 19.9% of health spending.

The Russian healthcare system is funded by the federal government, social spending and the Federal Compulsory Medical Insurance Fund. However, the industry expects a big shift towards the private healthcare spending.

Russia is a net importer of pharmaceuticals, importing $8.9 billion while exporting $635 million of medicines. Close to 80% of imports come from Europe, mostly from Germany and France.

==== Shipbuilding ====
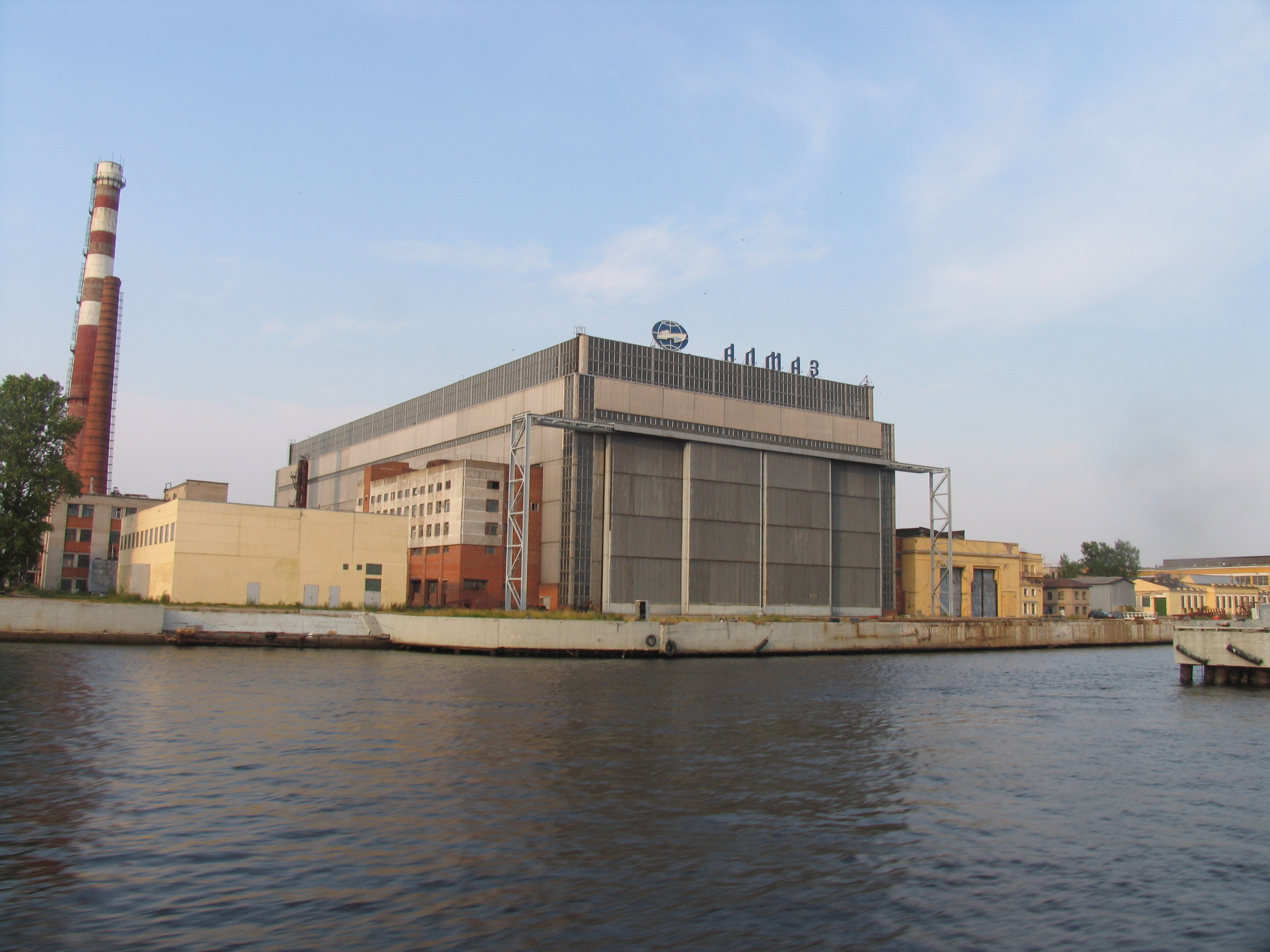
Almaz Shipbuilding Company plant in Saint Petersburg

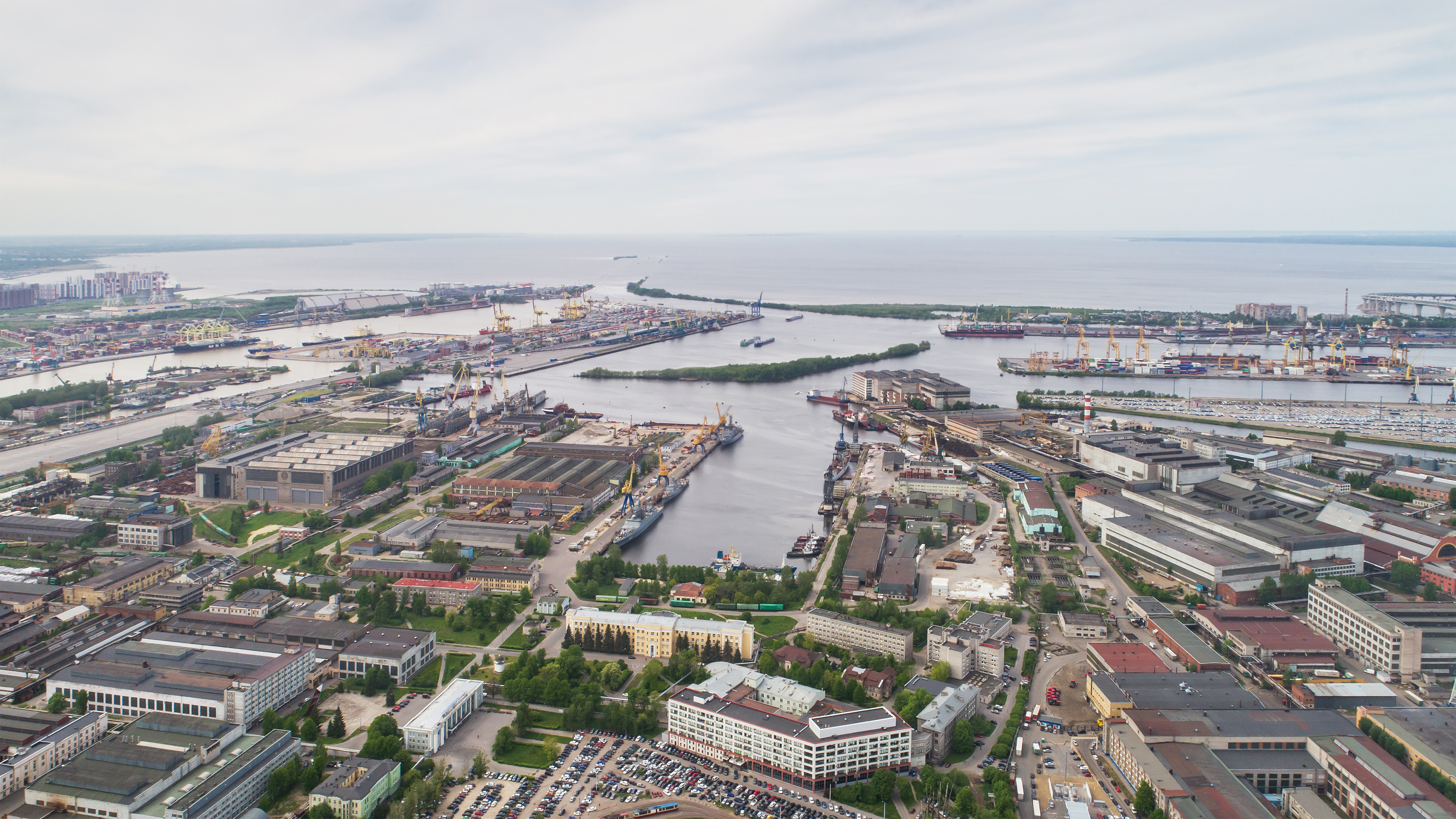
Severnaya Verf in Saint Petersburg

Shipbuilding is an established industry in Russia and is considered strategically important to both the country's armed forces and national economy.

=== Science and technology ===
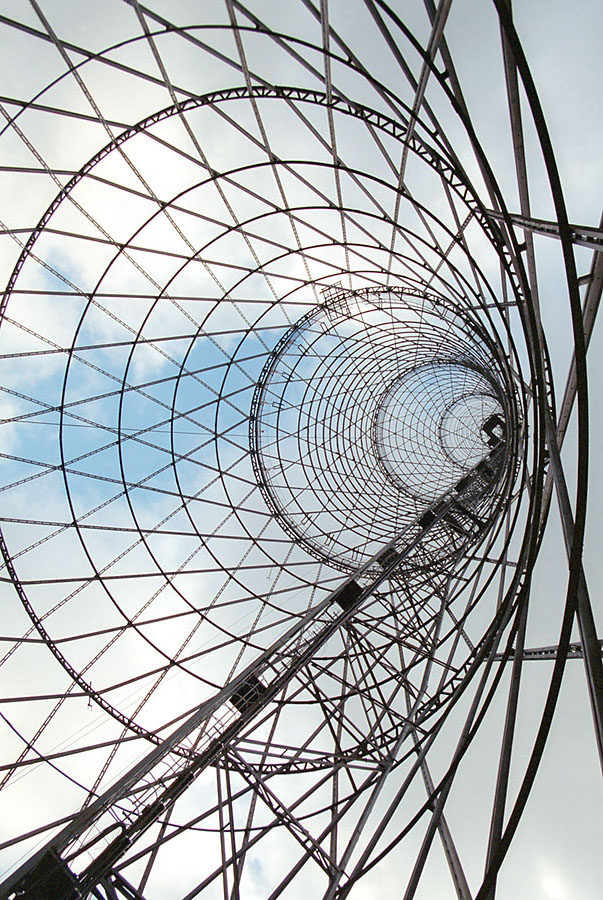
Shukhov Tower in Moscow

Science and technology in Russia have developed rapidly since the Age of Enlightenment, when Peter the Great founded the Russian Academy of Sciences and Saint Petersburg State University and polymath Mikhail Lomonosov founded the Moscow State University, establishing a strong native tradition in learning and innovation.

In the 19th and 20th centuries, Russia produced many notable scientists, making important contributions in physics, astronomy, mathematics, computing, chemistry, biology, geology and geography. Russian inventors and engineers excelled in such areas as electrical engineering, shipbuilding, aerospace, weaponry, communications, IT, nuclear technology and space technology.

The crisis of the 1990s led to the drastic reduction of state support for science and technology, leading many Russian scientists and university graduates to move to Western Europe or the United States. In the 2000s, on the wave of a new economic boom, the situation has improved, and the Russian government launched a campaign aimed into modernisation and innovation with mixed success.

=== Services ===
==== Education ====
In Russia, the state provides most education services regulating education through the Ministry of Education and the Ministry of Science and Higher Education. Regional authorities regulate education within their jurisdictions within the prevailing framework of federal laws. Russia's expenditure on education has grown from 2.7% of the GDP in 2005 to 4.7% in 2018 but remains below the OECD average of 4.9%.

Before 1990 the course of school training in the Soviet Union lasted 10 years, but at the end of 1990, an 11-year course officially came into operation. Education in state-owned secondary schools is free; first tertiary (university level) education is free with reservations: a substantial number of students enrol on full pay. Male and female students have equal shares in all stages of education, except in tertiary education where women lead with 57%.

A 2015 estimate by the United States Central Intelligence Agency puts the literacy rate in Russia at 99.7% (99.7% for men, 99.6% for women). According to a 2016 OECD estimate, 54% of Russia's adults (25- to 64-year-olds) have attained tertiary education, giving Russia the second-highest attainment of tertiary education among 35 OECD member countries. 47.7% have completed secondary education (the full 11-year course); 26.5% have completed middle school (9 years) and 8.1% have primary education (at least 4 years). The highest rates of tertiary education (24.7%) are recorded among women aged 35 to 39 years (compared to 19.5% for men of the same age bracket).

Compared with other OECD countries, Russia has close to average class sizes and some of the shortest instruction hours per year.

In 2014 the Pearson/Economist Intelligence Unit rated Russia's education as the 8th-best in Europe and the 13th-best in the world; Russia's educational attainment was rated as the 21st-highest in the world, and the students' cognitive skills as the 9th-highest.

In 2015 the OECD ranked Russian students' mathematics and science skills as the 34th-best in the world, between Sweden and Iceland.

In 2016 the US company Bloomberg rated Russia's higher education as the third-best in the world, measuring the percentage of high-school graduates who go on to attend college, the annual science and engineering graduates as a percentage of all college graduates, and science and engineering graduates as a percentage of the labor force.

In 2014 Russia ranked as the 6th most popular destination for international students.

The Human Rights Measurement Initiative finds that Russia is fulfilling 86.8% of what it should be fulfilling for the right to education, based on its level of income.

In 2025, Russia continued to maintain a large higher-education system, with more than 1,200 universities and over 619,000 state-funded higher-education places available for new students. The Russian Ministry of Science and Higher Education also reported that more than 395,000 international students were studying at Russian universities within the country, with the government aiming to increase the number of international students to at least 500,000 by 2030.

==== Healthcare ====
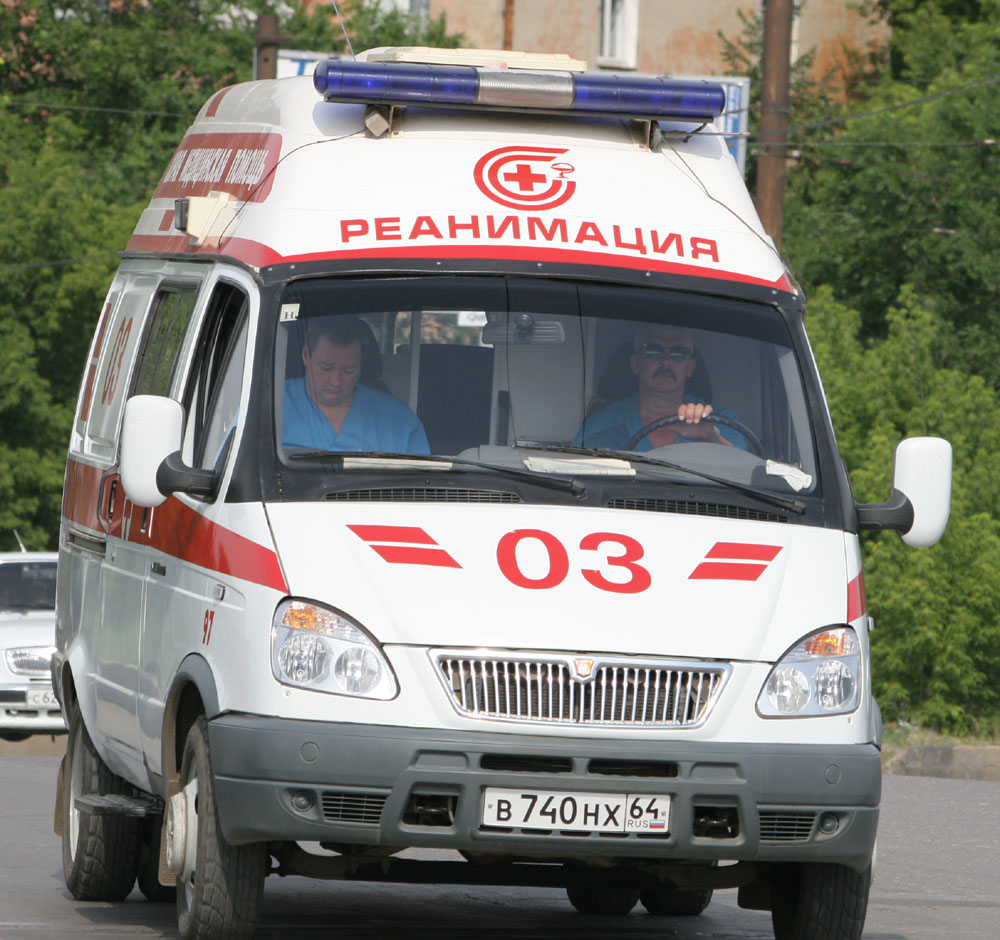
Ambulance car-based GAZelle is the most common type of ambulance in Russia

Healthcare in Russia is provided by the state through the Federal Compulsory Medical Insurance Fund, and regulated through the Ministry of Health. The Constitution of the Russian Federation has provided all citizens the right to free healthcare since 1993. In 2008, 621,000 doctors and 1.3 million nurses were employed in Russian healthcare. The number of doctors per 10,000 people was 43.8, but only 12.1 in rural areas. The number of general practitioners as a share of the total number of doctors was 1.26 percent. There are about 9.3 beds per thousand population—nearly double the OECD average.

Expenditure on healthcare was 6.5% of Gross domestic product, US$957 per person in 2013. About 48% comes from government sources which primarily come from medical insurance deductions from salaries. About 5% of the population, mostly in major cities, have voluntary health insurance.

The total population of Russia in 2016 was 146.8 million. Among this population, the number of employed individuals reached 72.3 million, involved in the 99 main types of productive and nonproductive activities. In modern conditions, the world experts estimate the overall health of the Russian working population (men 18–60 years, women 18–55 years) to be rather low due to the high mortality rate, significantly higher male mortality level, and a high prevalence of major noncommunicable diseases, especially those of the circulatory, respiratory, and digestive system. According to official government statistics, 1 of every 3 workers in Russia is exposed to harmful working conditions in which the levels of exposure in the workplace exceed the national hygienic standards. However, the level of occupational morbidity in Russia remains extremely low. In 2014, only 8175 cases of occupational diseases were reported, representing 5.5 cases per 100,000 in the general population, a rate much less than in many European countries.

After the end of the Soviet Union, Russian healthcare became composed of state and private systems. Drastic cuts in funding to the state-run healthcare system brought declines in the quality of healthcare it provided. This made pricier private facilities competitive by marketing themselves as providing better-quality healthcare. After Boris Yeltsin resigned, privatization was no longer the priority, with Vladimir Putin bringing back higher funding to the state-owned healthcare system. The state healthcare system greatly improved throughout the 2000s, with health spending per person rising from $96 in 2000 to $957 in 2013.

Due to the Russian financial crisis since 2014, major cuts in health spending have resulted in a decline in the quality of service of the state healthcare system. About 40% of basic medical facilities have fewer staff than they are supposed to have, with others being closed down. Waiting periods for treatment have increased, and patients have been forced to pay for more services that were previously free.

==== Retail ====
As of 2013, Russians spent 60% of their pre-tax income on shopping, the highest percentage in Europe. This is possible because many Russians pay no rent or house payments, owning their own home after privatization of state-owned Soviet housing. Shopping malls were popular with international investors and shoppers from the emerging middle class. Russia had over 1,000 shopping malls in 2020, although in 2022, many international companies left Russia resulting in empty stores in malls. A supermarket selling groceries is a typical anchor store in a Russian mall.

Retail sales in Russia

Year	2009	2010	2011	2012	2013	2014	2015	2016	2017	2018	2019	2020	2021	2022
Total retail sales (RUB trillions)	14.60	16.49	19.08	21.3	23.7	26.4	27.6	29.75	27.88	31.58	33.62	33.56	39.47	42.51

==== Telecommunications ====
In 2024 the revenue of Russian telecom operators amounted to more than 2.1 trillion rubles, which was 7.8% more than the previous year. There are four national mobile phone networks, MegaFon, Tele2, Beeline and MTS with total subscriptions between 2011 and 2021 ranging between 200 and 240 million. Although almost everyone uses the internet, as of 2026 Telegram is throttled and WhatsApp is blocked. As of 2024, Russia has 270 million active mobile subscribers, 188 million of them are mobile Internet users and 39 million active fixed-line Internet subscribers.

==== Transportation ====
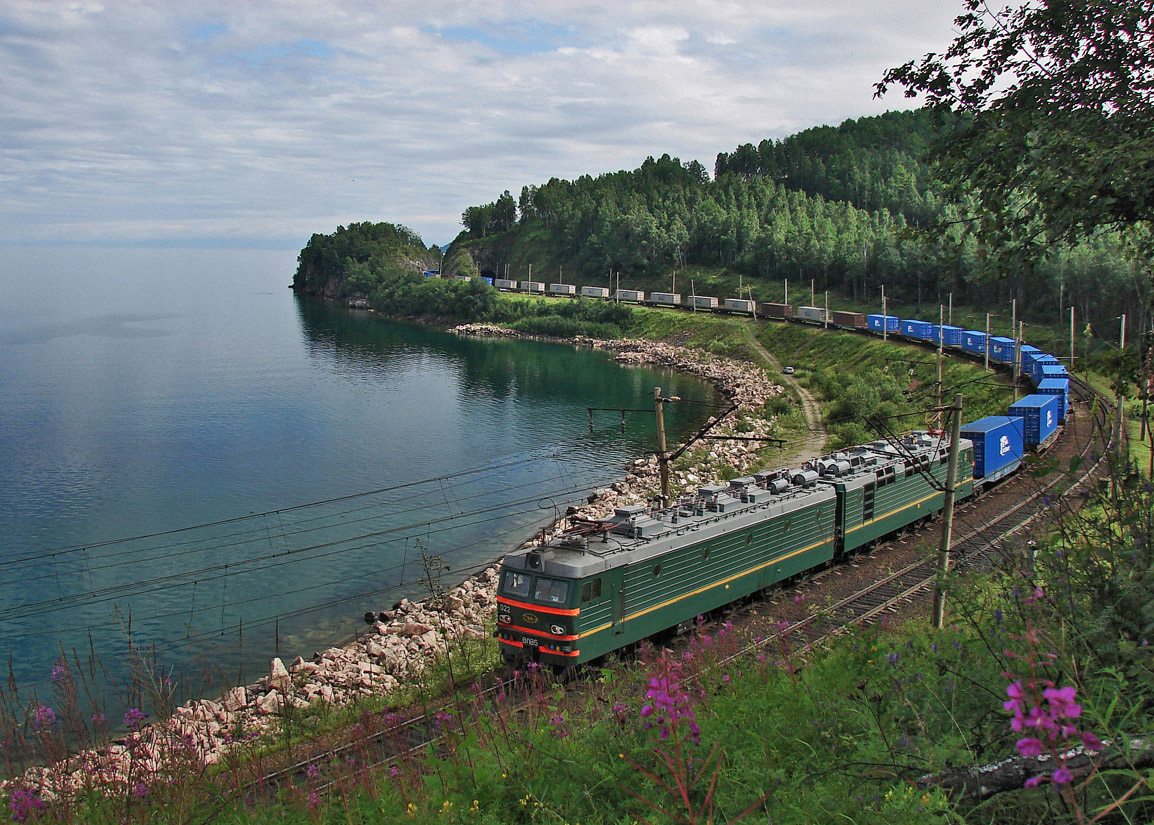
The Trans-Siberian Railway, the longest railway-line in the world, as seen across the coast of Lake Baikal

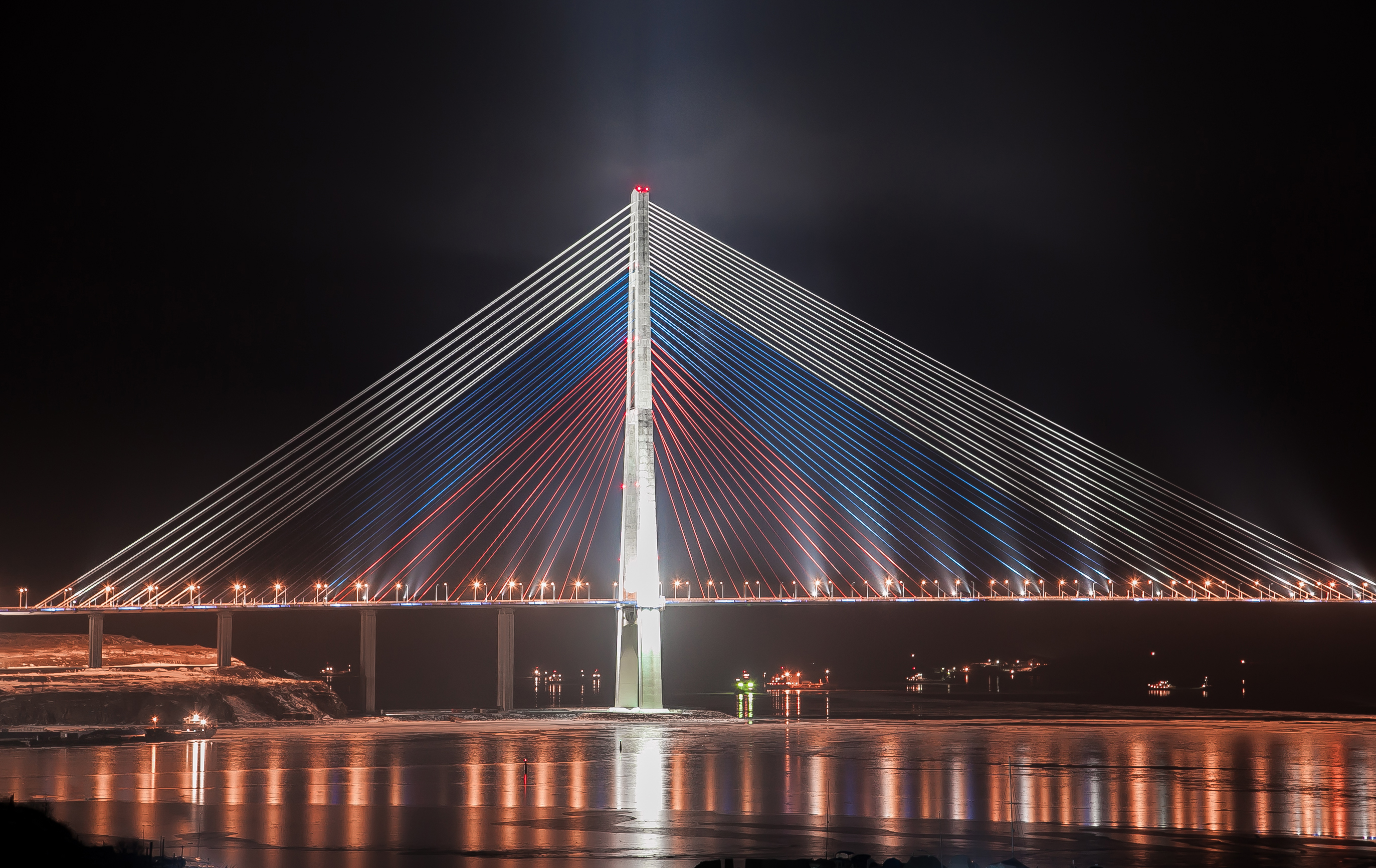
The Russky Bridge in Vladivostok is the longest cable-stayed bridge in the world.

Railway transport in Russia is mostly under the control of the state-run Russian Railways. The total length of common-used railway tracks is the world's third-longest, and exceeds 87,157 km (54,157 mi). As of 2016, Russia has 1,452.2 thousand km of roads, and its road density is among the world's lowest. Russia's inland waterways are the world's second-longest, and total 102,000 km (63,380 mi). Among Russia's 1,218 airports, the busiest is Sheremetyevo International Airport in Moscow. As of 2026 air transport is hampered by sanctions on spare parts from Boeing and Airbus, and by drones disrupting airports.

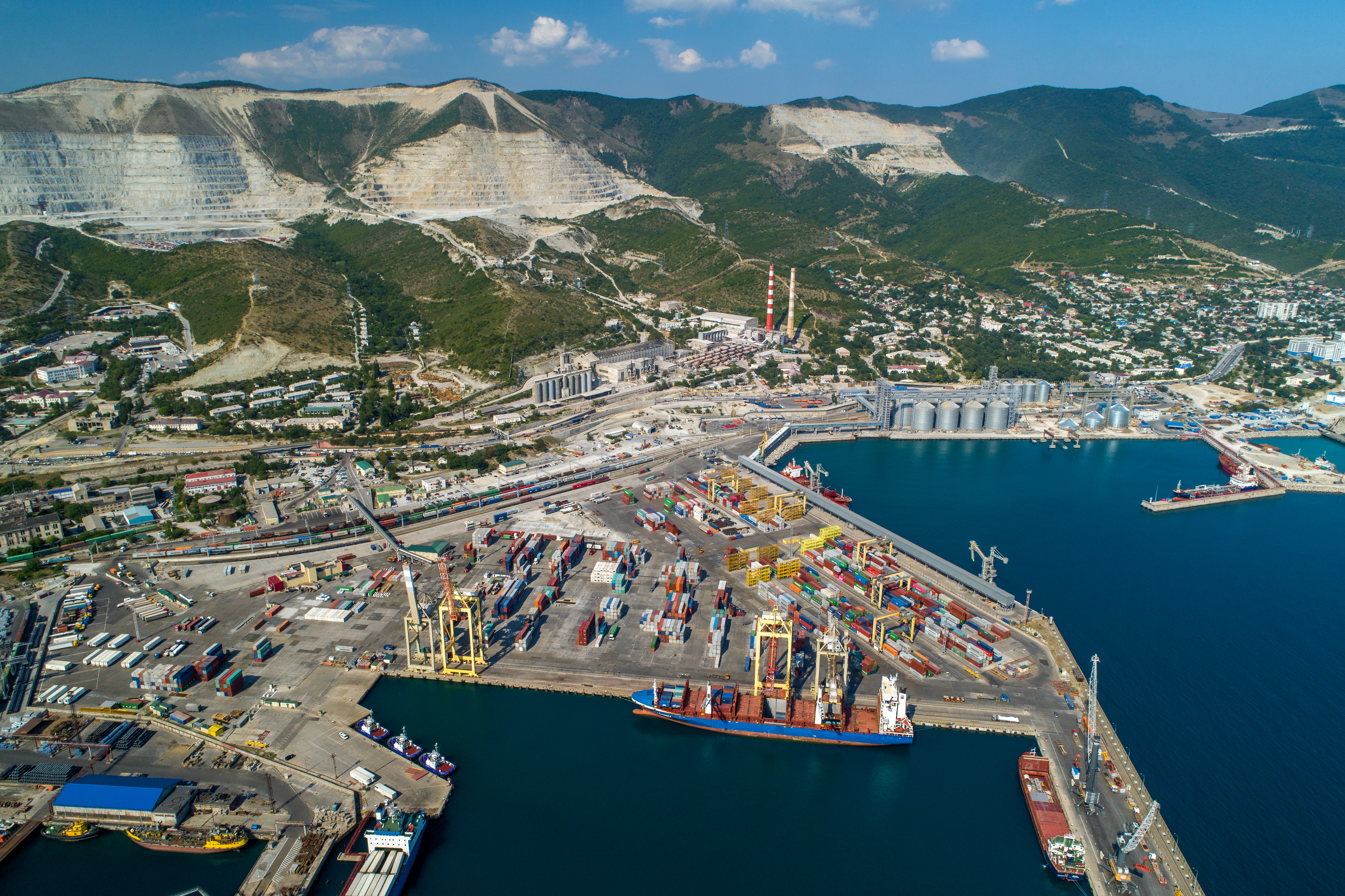
The Port of Novorossiysk

Russia is the world's sole country to operate nuclear-powered icebreakers, which advance the economic exploitation of the Arctic continental shelf of Russia, and the development of sea trade through the Northern Sea Route.

==== Water supply and sanitation ====
In Russia, approximately 70 per cent of drinking water comes from surface water and 30 per cent from groundwater. In 2004, water supply systems had a total capacity of 90 million cubic metres a day. The average residential water use was 248 litres per capita per day. One quarter of the world's fresh surface and groundwater is located in Russia. The water utilities sector is one of the largest industries in Russia serving the entire Russian population.

==== Construction and real estate ====
In 2022, construction was worth 13 trillion rubles, 5% more than in 2021. Residential construction in 2022 reached 126.7 million square metres (1,364 million square feet).

The 2020–2030 target for construction is 1 billion square metres (1.1×10^{10} square feet) of housing, 20% of all housing stock to be renovated and to increase space from 27.8 square metres (299 sq ft) up to 33.3 square metres (358 sq ft) per person.

==== Insurance ====
According to the Central Bank of Russia 422 insurance companies operate on the Russian insurance market by the end of 2013. The concentration of insurance business is significant across all major segments except compulsory motor third party liability market (CMTPL), as the top 10 companies in 2013 charged 58.1% premiums in total without compulsory health insurance (CHI).

Although relative indicators of the Russian insurance market returned to pre-crisis levels, the progress is achieved mainly by the increase of life insurance and accident insurance, the input of these two market segments in premium growth in 2013 largely exceeds their share on the market. As before, life insurance and accident insurance are often used by banks as an appendix to a credit contract protecting creditors from the risk of credit default in case of borrower's death or disability. The rise of these lines is connected, evidently, with the increase in consumer loans, as the total sum of credit obligations of population in 2013 increased by 28% to RUB 9.9 trillion. At the same time premium to GDP ratio net of life and accident insurance remained at the same level of 1.1% as in 2012. Thus, if "banking" lines of business are excluded, Russian insurance market is in stagnation stage for the last four years, as premiums to GDP ratio net of life and accident insurance remains at the same level of 1.1% since 2010.

==== Information technology ====
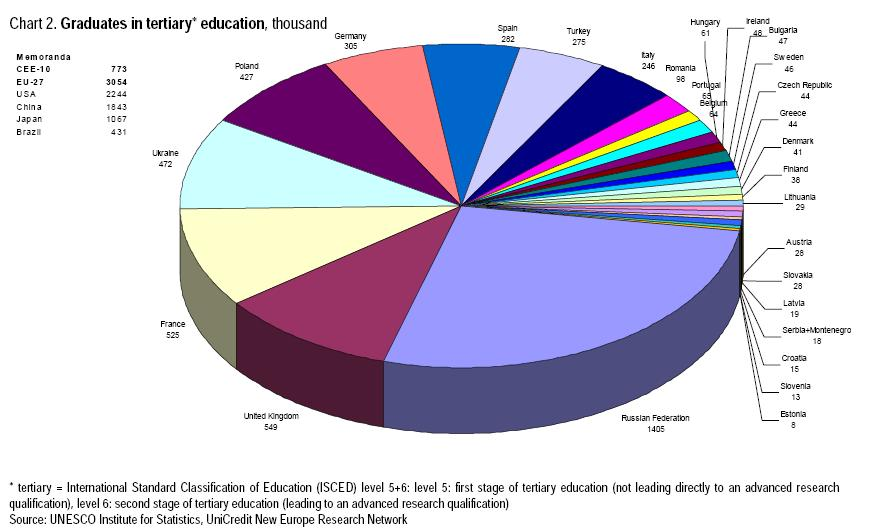
Russia has more academic graduates than any other country in Europe (and world leader in percentage of population with associate degree or higher: 54%, compared to 31% in UK).

Russian software exports have risen from just $120 million in 2000 to $3.3 billion in 2010. Since the year 2000 the IT market has started growth rates of 30–40% a year, growing by 54% in 2006 alone. The biggest sector in terms of revenue is system and network integration, which accounts for 28.3% of the total market revenues.

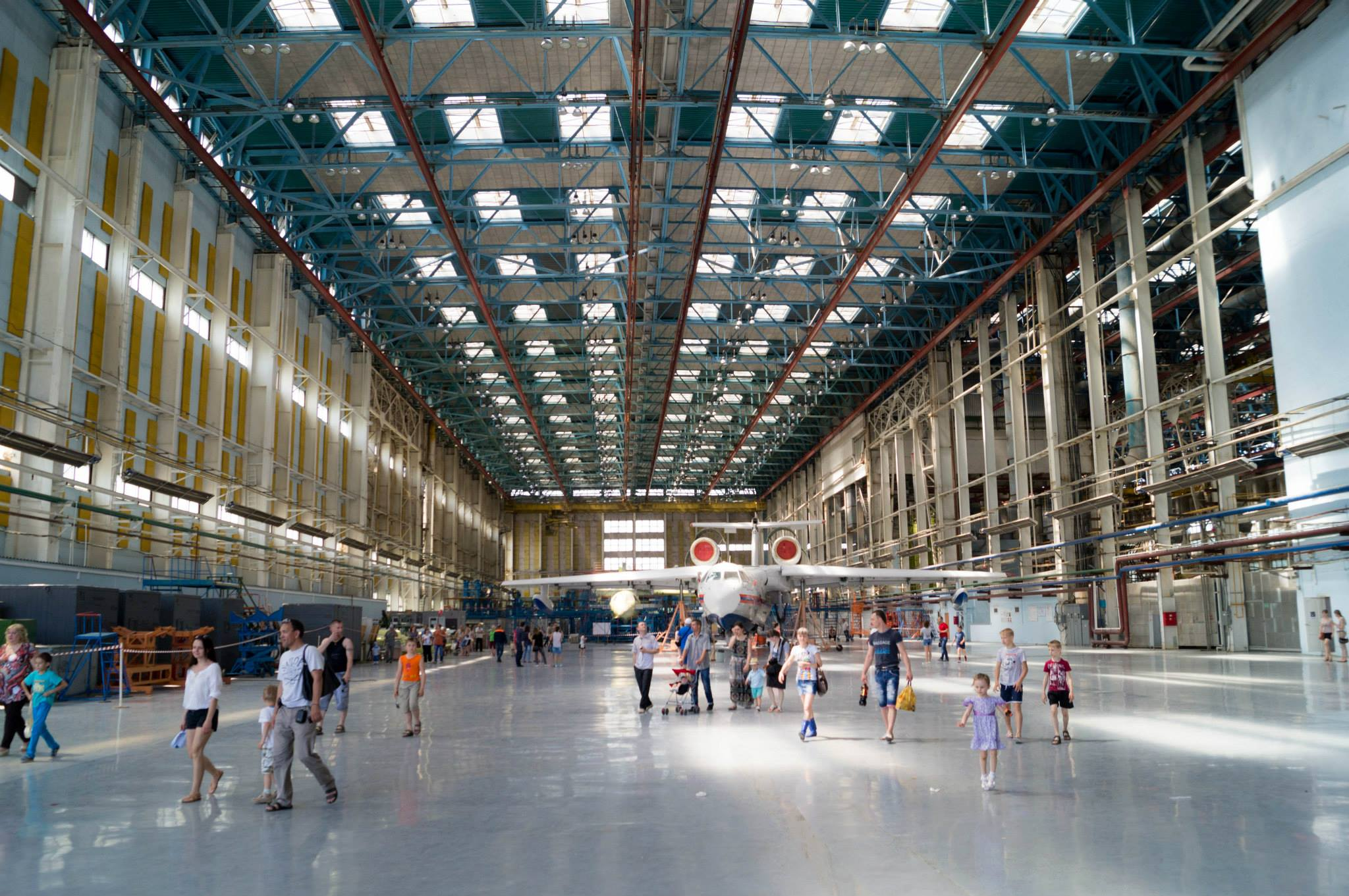
Interior of the Beriev Scientific and Technical Complex in Taganrog

The government has launched a program promoting construction of IT-oriented technology parks (Technoparks)—special zones that have an established infrastructure and enjoy a favorable tax and customs regime, in seven different locations: Moscow, Novosibirsk, Nizhny Novgorod, Kaluga, Tumen, Republic of Tatarstan and St. Peterburg Region.

Under a government decree signed in June 2013, a special "roadmap" is expected to ease business suppliers' access to the procurement programs of state-owned infrastructure monopolies, including such large ones as Gazprom, Rosneft, Russian Railways, Rosatom, and Transneft. These companies will be expected to increase the proportion of domestic technology solutions they use in their operations. The decree puts special emphasis on purchases of innovation products and technologies. According to the new decree, by 2015, government-connected companies must double their purchases of Russian technology solutions compared to the 2013 level and their purchasing levels must quadruple by 2018.

Russia is one of the few countries in the world with a homegrown internet search engine with a significant marketshare as the Russian-based search engine Yandex is used by 53.8% of internet users in the country.

Known Russian IT companies are ABBYY (FineReader OCR system and Lingvo dictionaries), Kaspersky Lab (Kaspersky Anti-Virus, Kaspersky Internet Security), Mail.Ru (portal, search engine, mail service, Mail.ru Agent messenger, ICQ, Odnoklassniki social network, online media sources).

==== Tourism ====
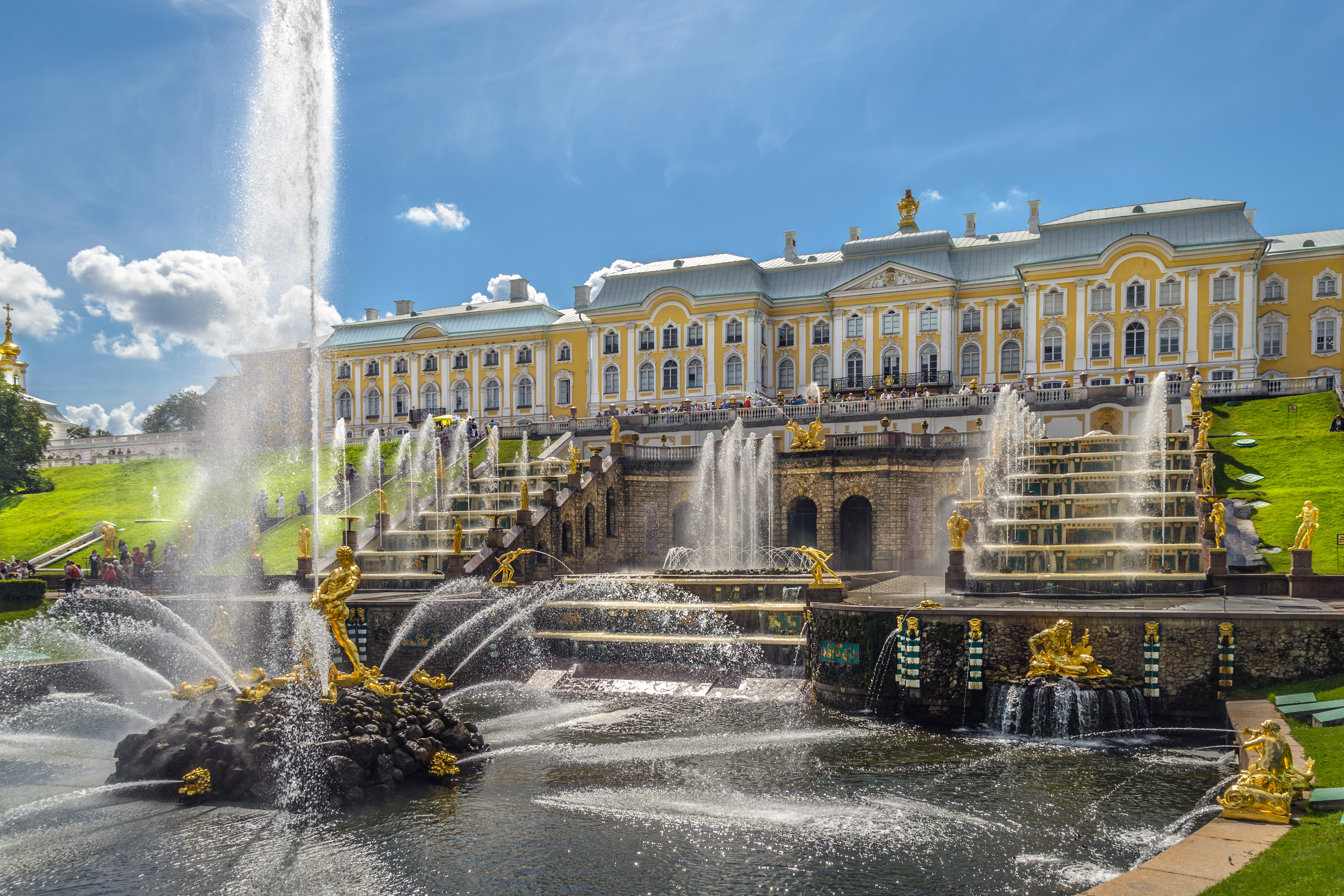
Peterhof Palace in Saint Petersburg, a UNESCO World Heritage Site

Most foreign tourists come from China. Major tourist routes in Russia include a journey around the Golden Ring theme route of ancient cities, cruises on the big rivers like the Volga, and journeys on the famous Trans-Siberian Railway. Russia's most visited and popular landmarks include Red Square, the Peterhof Palace, the Kazan Kremlin, the Trinity Lavra of St. Sergius and Lake Baikal.

== Economic integration ==
Top 4 largest economies (China, the US, India, Russia) in the world by PPP-adjusted GDP in 2023
according to the World Bank, the members of the Eurasian Economic Union as well as
Tajikistan and Uzbekistan that are forming a common market within the CIS (EAEU+2)

Russia joined the World Trade Organization (WTO) on 22 August 2012. On 20 September 2012, the Free Trade Agreement of the Commonwealth of Independent States signed on 18 October 2011 came into force (CIS FTA) for Russia and superseded previous agreements. Russia is a founding member of the Eurasian Economic Union (EAEU) and is party to EAEU trade agreements with Vietnam, Iran, Singapore, and Serbia. In 2018, the EAEU signed a trade cooperation agreement with China, and it is in trade negotiations with India, Israel, and Egypt. Russia is also a party to several agreements that predate the EAEU. The EAEU Treaty in 2015 superseded previous integration agreements and envisaged an economic union (the deepest stage of economic integration). The EAEU provides for free movement of goods, services, capital and labour without a work permit ("four economic freedoms" as in the European Union), pursues coordinated, harmonized and single policy in the sectors determined by the Treaty and international agreements within the Union. The EAEU has a Eurasian Customs Union and an integrated single market of 183 million people.

== External trade and investment ==
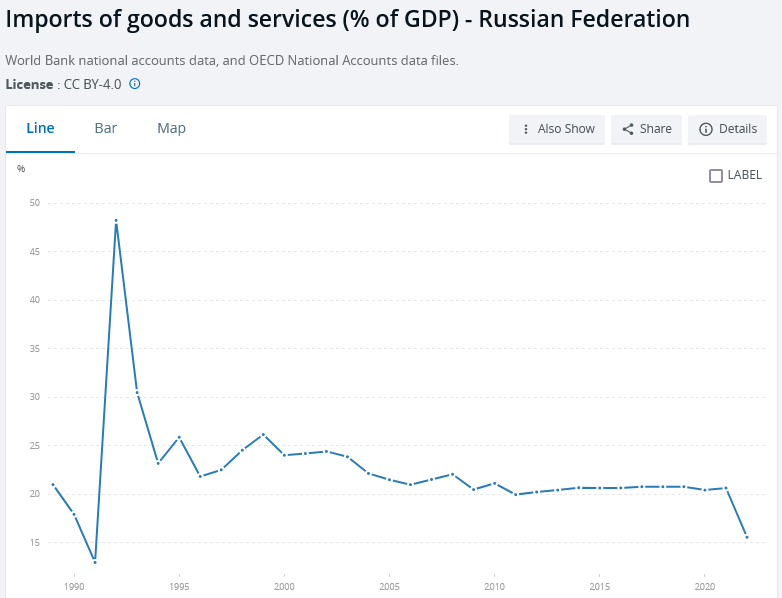
Over the past 30 years, the share of imports of goods and services as a share of Russia's GDP has been below 25% for almost all years. The growth of oil rents, rapid economic growth, economic integration, WTO accession, improved transport accessibility and the government's import substitution program hardly changed the percentage, and only sanctions and boycotts in 2022 led to a drop to 15.6%.

=== Foreign payments ===
Since the collapse of the Bretton Woods system and the creation of the Jamaican monetary system, membership in the International Monetary Fund no longer requires the use of the US dollar, and by 1973 the US dollar was no longer the sole global currency. Russia joined the IMF in 1992, although the USSR had previously refused to ratify the founding document.

The Soviet Union and other socialist countries used the so-called transferable ruble and clearing ruble.

The Interstate Bank became the first international financial organization created by the Commonwealth of Independent States, which was given the specific goal of developing mutual settlements in national currencies. The mechanism for cross-border settlements in national currencies (payment and settlement system), based on the use of direct correspondent accounts with central banks and access to payment systems, has been in operation for more than 15 years (since circa 2005), as reported in 2020. The Agreement on Establishment of the Interstate Bank was signed on 22 January 1993 by Armenia, Belarus, Kazakhstan, Kyrgyzstan, Moldova, Russia, Tajikistan, Turkmenistan, Uzbekistan, Ukraine and ratified by all countries except Ukraine, which revoked its signature in 1997.

Back in February 2010, online retailer Sportmaster announced its intention to become the first Russian company to switch to the national currency for settlements with suppliers and to use the yuan for trade with China. On 13 December 2010, Bank HSBC announced that it had processed Russia's first international transaction in yuan for the Sportmaster group of companies. As part of China's efforts to internationalize the yuan, trading in the ruble/yuan currency pair began on the MICEX on 16 December 2010. The Moscow Interbank Currency Exchange (MICEX) became the first organized (i.e., exchange-based) platform for yuan trading outside China. This was made possible by an agreement signed in April 2010 on the mutual launch of trading in yuan and rubles. Since the end of November 2010, rubles can be bought in China on the China Foreign Exchange Trade System.

In 2017, a payment versus payment (PVP) system was created for the first time for transactions between the yuan and foreign currencies, according to a statement published on the website of the China Foreign Exchange Trade System (CFETS). The ruble became the first foreign currency to be included in the system. Earlier, the Russian central bank opened its first overseas office in Beijing, and the Industrial and Commercial Bank of China (ICBC) officially began operating as a Chinese clearing bank for yuan settlements in Russia. In 2020, VTB's Shanghai branch connected to China's national domestic payment system, CNAPS (China National Advanced Payment System). It has direct access to the CNAPS national payment system, which allows payments to be made to all local banks connected to this system, i.e., virtually all banks in China. Settlements are made through accounts with the central bank of the People's Republic of China.

By 2022, 23 Russian banks had been connected to the Chinese Cross-Border Interbank Payment System. Back in 2022, nine Russian banks, including Sberbank and VTB Bank, opened special accounts in India for settlements in rupees for Indian-Russian trade transactions in order to internationalize the rupee and facilitate international trade operations.

In 2023, the vice president of the Interstate Bank noted that payments in national currencies had increased significantly. By 2023, the Russian ruble had become the main currency for trade with the CIS.

In 2023, Elvira Nabiullina, Governor of the Bank of Russia, attended the Asian Clearing Union summit in Tehran. In 2023, the Central Bank of Iran announced that by connecting to the Russian Central Bank's payment system, it had also gained access to more than 100 banks in 13 countries, in addition to Russia. An Iranian banking official revealed that all Russian banks and 106 banks in 13 other countries have been connected to Iran's financial messaging system known as SEPAM. In 2024, Mohammad Reza Farzin, head of the Central Bank of Iran, announced a new ACUMER system to replace SWIFT and a new agreement with Russia. In 2024, Farzin emphasized Iran's readiness to provide technical capabilities for Russia's membership in the Asian Clearing Union. "Belarus recently requested to join this union, and we invite Russia to join as well," he said. The National Bank of Belarus, Russia's closest ally, has already become a member of the Asian Clearing Union.

Launched in 2025, Digital renminbi is already available in Russia and other CIS countries, said Boris Titov, co-chairman of the Russian-Chinese Friendship Committee.

Russia has become the leader among European countries surpassing Britain in terms of incoming cryptocurrency flows, according to a report by the analytical company Chainalysis for the period from July 2024 to June 2025. Analysts estimate the volume of cryptocurrencies that entered Russia during this period at $376.3 billion. One reason for the rapid growth of the Russian cryptocurrency market has been cross-border settlements, primarily using the ruble-pegged stablecoin A7A5.

The share of payments in Russian rubles in Russia's foreign trade settlements in August 2025 once again reached an all-time high, reaching 55.2%, according to calculations based on data on the currency structure of foreign trade settlements on the Bank of Russia website. The share of payments in rubles for Russian exports was record high in August, rising to 56.3%. The share of payments in Russian rubles for imported goods and services to Russia in August was 54.1%. Payments in currencies of friendly countries accounted for 29.4% of exports from Russia in August. In payments for imports to Russia, this figure was 30.1% in August. The share of "toxic" currencies in payments for exports in August was 14.3%, and for imports to Russia, it was 15.7%. Russia and Iran already conduct 80% of their mutual settlements in rials and rubles. According to the Ministry of Economic Development, the share of national currencies in trade with CIS countries has already exceeded 85%, and with China it has come close to 95%. In November 2025, Minister Siluanov stated that the ruble and yuan now account for over 99% of trade settlements between Russia and China.

A 2025 study said that an important constraint on the economy was “Russia’s dependence on hard currencies like the dollar and the euro, with only partial “yuanization” of its foreign trade transactions”.

=== Investments ===
Russia has concluded a number of Bilateral Investment Treaties (BITs), Treaties with Investment Provisions (TIPs) and Investment Related Instruments (IRIs) according to the database of UNCTAD. 65 agreements have entered into force.

=== Trade ===
Exports of Russia by product category (2019) Chemical products Transportation Machines Mineral products Plastics and rubbers Metals Foodstuffs Precious metals Textiles Instruments Animal products Vegetable products Paper goods Footwear and headwear Miscellaneous Stone and glass Wood products Animal and vegetable bi-products Animal hides Arts and antiques Weapons

Russia recorded a trade surplus of US$15.8 billion in 2013.

In 2015, Russia main exports are oil and natural gas (62.8% of total exports), ores and metals (5.9%), chemical products (5.8%), machinery and transport equipment (5.4%) and food (4.7%). Others include: agricultural raw materials (2.2%) and textiles (0.2%).

Russia top exports in 2021 were: Crude oil $110.9b, Processed oil $69.9b, gold $17.3b, coal $15.4b and natural gas $7.3b.

Russia top imports in 2021 were: Transmission equipment $10.7b, medication $7.3b, tankers $3.7b, parts and accessories for data processing 3.7b and storage units $3.3b.

Foreign trade of Russia – Russian export and import

Year	2005	2006	2007	2008	2009	2010	2011	2012	2013	2014	2015	2016	2017	2018	2019	2020	2021
Export (US$ billions)	241	302	352	468	302	397	517	525	527	498	344	302	379	451	427	337	492
Import (US$ billions)	99	138	200	267	171	229	306	316	315	287	183	207	260	240	247	231	293

Top trading partners for Russia for 2021

Imports into Russia 2021
Ranking	Country	Value (USD)	%
	World	$293.4b	100.0%
1	China	$72.7b	24.7%
2	Germany	$27.3b	9.3%
3	United States	$17.2b	5.8%
4	Belarus	$15.6b	5.3%
5	South Korea	$12.9b	4.4%
6	France	$12.2b	4.1%
7	Italy	$12.0b	4.1%
8	Japan	$9.1b	3.1%
9	Kazakhstan	$7.1b	2.4%
10	Turkey	$6.5b	2.2%

Exports from Russia for 2021
Ranking	Country	Value (USD)	%
	World	$492.3b	100.0%
1	China	$68.6b	13.9%
2	Netherlands	$42.1b	8.5%
3	Germany	$29.6b	6.0%
4	Turkey	$26.4b	5.3%
5	Belarus	$23.1b	4.7%
6	United Kingdom	$22.2b	4.5%
7	Italy	$19.2b	3.9%
8	Kazakhstan	$18.4b	3.7%
9	United States	$17.7b	3.6%
10	South Korea	$16.8b	3.4%

GRP per capita, 2016 (US dollars): 50 000 and over 30 000 – 50 000 9 750 (Russian average) – 20 000 7 500 – 9 750 5 000 – 7 500 Under 3 000

==== 2013–present ====
In 2017, Russian Federation's commercial services' shares of total exports and imports were 13.9% and 26.8%, respectively. Russian Federation had a trade-to-GDP ratio of 46.6% in 2017. In 2013–2017, Russia had a trade surplus for goods, and a trade deficit for services. Since trade in goods is larger than trade in services, Russia had a significant trade surplus. Trade is relatively important to the Russian economy: the ratio of Russia's goods trade (exports plus imports) to GDP has averaged about 40% in recent years, compared to 20% for the United States. In 2021, Russia ranked 13th among world goods exporters and 22nd among importers. According to Russian official sources, its goods exports totaled $492 billion in 2021, up 46% from 2020 (not adjusting for inflation). Minerals, including oil and gas, made up nearly 45% of these exports. Goods imports rose by 27%, reaching $294 billion in 2021. Machinery and mechanical appliances topped the list of imports, accounting for almost a third of Russia's goods imports. In services trade, Russia ranked 26th among world exporters and 19th among importers in 2020, the most recent year for which data is available. The country was a net importer of services, exporting $49 billion worth of services and importing $76 billion.

According to the World Bank, imports of goods and services accounted for 21.3% of Russia's gross domestic product (GDP) in 2021, while exports made up 30.9%. Russia has trade-to-GDP ratio (trade openness) 49.26% which is below the global average. In a December 2022 study, an economist from the Bank of Russia's Research and Forecasting Department found that Russia's import dependence is relatively low, does not exceed the median for other countries and the share of imports in most industries is lower than in other countries. The key explanation for this could be the low involvement of the Russian economy in global value supply chains and its focus on production of raw materials. However, 60% of Russia's imports come from the countries that have imposed sanctions against it.

== Mergers and acquisitions ==
Between 1985 and 2018, almost 28,500 mergers or acquisitions have been announced in Russia. This cumulates to an overall value of around US$984 billion which translates to RUB 5.456 billion. In terms of value, 2007 has been the most active year with US$158 billion, whereas the number of deals peaked in 2010 with 3,684 (964 compared to the value record year 2007). Since 2010 value and numbers have decreased constantly and another wave of M&A is expected.

== See also ==
- History of Russia (1991–present)
- Federal government of Russia
- List of companies of Russia
- List of federal subjects of Russia by GDP per capita
- List of federal subjects of Russia by poverty rate
- List of federal subjects of Russia by unemployment rate
- List of Russian billionaires
- List of Russian federal districts by GDP
- List of trade unions in Russia
- Boycott of Russia and Belarus
- Monotown, a town whose economy is dominated by a single industry or company. The term is sometimes used regarding some towns in Russia.
- Moscow Exchange
- Politics of Russia
- Russia and the World Bank
- Russian oligarchs
- Shadow economy of Russia
- Social entrepreneurship in Russia
- Social security system in Russia
- State-owned enterprises of Russia
- Types of business entity in Russia
- Types of legal entities in Russia
- Unemployment in Russia
- Unitary enterprise, a government-owned corporation in Russia and some other post-Soviet states
- Virtual economy of Russia

== Sources ==
- Davies, Robert William (28 March 1998). Soviet Economic Development from Lenin to Khrushchev. Cambridge University Press. ISBN 978-0-521-62742-9.
