= Political divisions of Russia =

Russia is divided into several types and levels of subdivisions.

== Federal districts ==
The federal districts are groupings of the federal subjects of Russia. Federal districts are not mentioned in the nation's constitution, do not have competences of their own, and do not manage regional affairs. They exist solely to monitor consistency between the federal and regional bodies of law, and ensure governmental control over the civil service, judiciary, and federal agencies operating in the regions. The federal district system was established on 13 May 2000. There are eight total federal districts.

The eight federal districts of Russia

| Federal district | Date established | Area [km^{2}] | 2021 census | | HDI (2021) | GRDP (2022) ₽ and US$ | | Federal subjects | Administrative centre | Largest city | Map |
| Federal district | Date established | Area [km^{2}] | Population | Per km^{2} | HDI (2021) | Total | Per capita | Federal subjects | Administrative centre | Largest city | Map |
|---|---|---|---|---|---|---|---|---|---|---|---|
| North Caucasian | 19 January 2010 | 170,400 | 10,171,000 | 60 | 0.793 | ₽3.111 trillion ($45B) | ₽305,334 ($4458) | 7 | Pyatigorsk | Makhachkala | |
| Southern (Note: Includes the Republic of Crimea and Sevastopol, annexed by Russia in 2014, as well as Donetsk, Kherson, Luhansk, and Zaporizhia oblasts annexed in 2022; recognised as parts of Ukraine by most of the international community.) | 13 May 2000 | 427,800 | 16,746,000 (Note: Population figures from the Crimean Census in 2014. Crimea was annexed by Russia in 2014, after the 2010 Russian Census.) | 39 | 0.799 | ₽9.816 trillion ($143B) | ₽588,461 ($8593) | 8 | Rostov-on-Don | Krasnodar | |
| Central | 13 May 2000 | 650,200 | 40,342,000 | 62 | 0.845 | ₽47.368 trillion ($692B) | ₽1,176,273 ($17176) | 18 | Moscow | | |
| Northwestern | 13 May 2000 | 1,687,000 | 13,917,000 | 8 | 0.833 | ₽18.929 trillion ($276B) | ₽1,362,907 ($19901) | 11 | Saint Petersburg | | |
| Volga | 13 May 2000 | 1,037,000 | 28,943,000 | 28 | 0.804 | ₽19.664 trillion ($287B) | ₽683,355 ($9978) | 14 | Nizhny Novgorod | Kazan | |
| Ural | 13 May 2000 | 1,818,500 | 12,301,000 | 7 | 0.839 | ₽20.073 trillion ($293B) | ₽1,635,678 ($23884) | 6 | Yekaterinburg | | |
| Siberian | 13 May 2000 | 4,361,800 | 16,793,000 | 4 | 0.794 | ₽13.054 trillion ($191B) | ₽781,580 ($11412) | 10 | Novosibirsk | | |
| Far Eastern | 13 May 2000 | 6,952,600 | 7,976,000 | 1 | 0.808 | ₽8.656 trillion ($126B) | ₽1,090,778 ($15927) | 11 | Vladivostok | Khabarovsk | |

== Federal subjects ==

Since 30 September 2022, the Russian Federation has consisted of eighty-nine federal subjects that are constituent members of the Federation. However, six of these federal subjects—the Republic of Crimea, the Donetsk People's Republic, the Kherson Oblast, the Luhansk People's Republic, the federal city of Sevastopol, and the Zaporozhye Oblast—are internationally recognised as part of Ukraine. All federal subjects are of equal federal rights in the sense that they have equal representation—two delegates each—in the Federation Council (upper house of the Federal Assembly). They do, however, differ in the degree of autonomy they enjoy.

De jure, excluding the occupied Ukrainian territories, there are 6 types of federal subjects—21 republics, 9 krais, 46 oblasts, 2 federal cities, 1 autonomous oblast, and 4 autonomous okrugs.

Autonomous okrugs are the only ones that have an unusual status of being federal subjects in their own right, yet at the same time they are considered to be administrative divisions of other federal subjects (with the Chukotka Autonomous Okrug being the only exception).

=== Status of the Ukrainian territories occupied by Russia ===
On 18 March 2014, as a part of the annexation of Crimea, and following the establishment of the Republic of Crimea (an independent entity that was recognised only by Russia), a treaty was signed between Russia and the Republic of Crimea incorporating the Republic of Crimea and the City of Sevastopol as constituent members of the Russian Federation. According to the Treaty, the Republic of Crimea is accepted as a federal subject with the status of a republic while the City of Sevastopol has received federal city status. Neither the Republic of Crimea nor the city of Sevastopol are politically recognised as parts of Russia by most countries.

Similarly, Russia also annexed four Ukrainian oblasts of Donetsk, Kherson, Luhansk, and Zaporozhzhia on 30 September 2022 after internationally-unrecognised referendums held days prior, during the invasion of Ukraine that began in late February, which were organised by Russian occupation authorities in territories where hostilities were ongoing and much of the population had fled. It occurred seven months after the start of the invasion and less than a month after the start of the Ukrainian Kharkiv counteroffensive. The signing ceremony was held in the Grand Kremlin Palace in Moscow in the presence of occupation authority heads Leonid Pasechnik, Denis Pushilin, Yevgeny Balitsky, Vladimir Saldo, and Russian President Vladimir Putin. Like Crimea, none of the four occupied regions are internationally recognised as part of Russia.

== List ==
Federal subjects of the Russian Federation
| Code | Name | Capital/ administrative centre (Note: The largest city is also listed when it is different from the capital/administrative centre.) | Flag | Coat of arms | Type | Titular nation | Head of subject | Federal district | Economic region | Area (km^{2}) | Population | | Est. |
| Code | Name | Capital/ administrative centre | Flag | Coat of arms | Type | Titular nation | Head of subject | Federal district | Economic region | Area (km^{2}) | Total | Density (per km^{2}) | Est. |
|---|---|---|---|---|---|---|---|---|---|---|---|---|---|
| 01 | Adygea | Maykop | Adygea | | republic | Circassians | Murat Kumpilov (UR) | Southern | North Caucasus | 7,792 | 496,934 | 63.77 | 1922 |
| 02 | Bashkortostan | Ufa | Bashkortostan | | republic | Bashkirs | Radiy Khabirov (UR) | Volga | Ural | 142,947 | 4,091,423 | 28.62 | 1919 |
| 03 | Buryatia | Ulan-Ude | Buryatia | | republic | Buryats | Alexey Tsydenov (UR) | Far Eastern | East Siberian | 351,334 | 978,588 | 2.79 | 1923 |
| 04 | Altai Republic | Gorno-Altaysk | Altai Republic | | republic | Altai | Oleg Khorokhordin (Ind.) | Siberian | West Siberian | 92,903 | 210,924 | 2.27 | 1922 |
| 05 | Dagestan | Makhachkala | Dagestan | | republic | Aghuls, Avars, Azerbaijanis, Chechens, Dargins, Kumyks, Laks, Lezgins, Nogais, Rutuls, Tabasarans, Tats, Tsakhurs | Sergey Melikov (Ind.) | North Caucasian | North Caucasus | 50,270 | 3,182,054 | 63.30 | 1921 |
| 06 | Ingushetia | Magas (Largest city: Nazran) | Ingushetia | | republic | Ingush | Mahmud-Ali Kalimatov (UR) | North Caucasian | North Caucasus | 3,628 | 509,541 | 163.16 | 1992 |
| 07 | Kabardino-Balkaria | Nalchik | Kabardino-Balkaria | | republic | Balkars, Kabardians | Kazbek Kokov (UR) | North Caucasian | North Caucasus | 12,470 | 904,200 | 72.51 | 1936 |
| 08 | Kalmykia | Elista | Kalmykia | | republic | Kalmyks | Batu Khasikov (UR) | Southern | Volga | 74,731 | 267,133 | 3.57 | 1957 |
| 09 | Karachay-Cherkessia | Cherkessk | Karachay-Cherkessia | | republic | Abazins, Kabardians, Karachays, Nogais | Rashid Temrezov (UR) | North Caucasian | North Caucasus | 14,277 | 469,865 | 32.91 | 1957 |
| 10 | Karelia | Petrozavodsk | Karelia | | republic | Karelians | Artur Parfenchikov (UR) | Northwestern | Northern | 180,520 | 533,121 | 2.95 | 1956 |
| 11 | Komi Republic | Syktyvkar | Komi | | republic | Komi | Vladimir Uyba (UR) | Northwestern | Northern | 416,774 | 737,853 | 1.77 | 1921 |
| 12 | Mari El | Yoshkar-Ola | Mari El | | republic | Mari | Yury Zaitsev (UR, acting) | Volga | Volga-Vyatka | 23,375 | 677,097 | 28.97 | 1920 |
| 13 | Mordovia | Saransk | Mordovia | | republic | Mordvins | Artyom Zdunov (UR) | Volga | Volga-Vyatka | 26,128 | 783,552 | 29.99 | 1930 |
| 14 | Sakha | Yakutsk | Sakha | | republic | Yakuts | Aysen Nikolayev (UR) | Far Eastern | Far Eastern | 3,083,523 | 995,686 | 0.32 | 1922 |
| 15 | North Ossetia–Alania | Vladikavkaz | North Ossetia | | republic | Ossetians | Sergey Menyaylo (UR) | North Caucasian | North Caucasus | 7,987 | 687,357 | 86.06 | 1924 |
| 16 | Tatarstan | Kazan | Tatarstan | | republic | Tatars | Rustam Minnikhanov (UR) | Volga | Volga | 67,847 | 4,004,809 | 59.03 | 1920 |
| 17 | Tuva | Kyzyl | Tuva | | republic | Tuvans | Vladislav Khovalyg (UR) | Siberian | East Siberian | 168,604 | 336,651 | 2.00 | 1944 |
| 18 | Udmurtia | Izhevsk | Udmurtia | | republic | Udmurts | Aleksandr Brechalov (UR) | Volga | Ural | 42,061 | 1,452,914 | 34.54 | 1920 |
| 19 | Khakassia | Abakan | Khakassia | | republic | Khakas | Valentin Konovalov (CPRF) | Siberian | East Siberian | 61,569 | 534,795 | 8.69 | 1930 |
| 20 (Note: In February 2000, the former code of 20 for the Chechen Republic was cancelled and replaced with code 95. License plate production was suspended due to the Chechen Wars, causing numerous issues, which in turn forced the region to use a new code.) | Chechnya | Grozny | Chechnya | | republic | Chechens | Ramzan Kadyrov (UR) | North Caucasian | North Caucasus | 16,165 | 1,510,824 | 93.43 | 1991 |
| 21 | Chuvashia | Cheboksary | Chuvashia | | republic | Chuvash | Oleg Nikolayev (SRZP) | Volga | Volga-Vyatka | 18,343 | 1,186,909 | 64.71 | 1920 |
| 22 | Altai Krai | Barnaul | Altai Krai | | krai | | Viktor Tomenko (UR) | Siberian | West Siberian | 167,996 | 2,163,693 | 12.88 | 1937 |
| 23 | Krasnodar Krai | Krasnodar | Krasnodar Krai | | krai | | Veniamin Kondratyev (UR) | Southern | North Caucasus | 75,485 | 5,838,273 | 77.34 | 1937 |
| 24 | Krasnoyarsk Krai | Krasnoyarsk | Krasnoyarsk Krai | | krai | | Mikhail Kotyukov (UR) | Siberian | East Siberian | 2,366,797 | 2,856,971 | 1.21 | 1934 |
| 25 | Primorsky Krai | Vladivostok | Primorsky Krai | | krai | | Oleg Kozhemyako (UR) | Far Eastern | Far Eastern | 164,673 | 1,845,165 | 11.21 | 1938 |
| 26 | Stavropol Krai | Stavropol | Stavropol Krai | | krai | | Vladimir Vladimirov (UR) | North Caucasian | North Caucasus | 66,160 | 2,907,593 | 43.95 | 1934 |
| 27 | Khabarovsk Krai | Khabarovsk | Khabarovsk Krai | | krai | | Mikhail Degtyarev (LDPR) | Far Eastern | Far Eastern | 787,633 | 1,292,944 | 1.64 | 1938 |
| 28 | Amur Oblast | Blagoveshchensk | Amur Oblast | | oblast | | Vasily Orlov (UR) | Far Eastern | Far Eastern | 361,908 | 766,912 | 2.12 | 1932 |
| 29 | Arkhangelsk Oblast | Arkhangelsk | Arkhangelsk Oblast | | oblast | | Alexander Tsybulsky (UR) | Northwestern | Northern | 413,103 | 978,873 | 2.37 | 1937 |
| 30 | Astrakhan Oblast | Astrakhan | Astrakhan Oblast | | oblast | | Igor Babushkin (Ind.) | Southern | Volga | 49,024 | 960,142 | 19.59 | 1943 |
| 31 | Belgorod Oblast | Belgorod | Belgorod Oblast | | oblast | | Vyacheslav Gladkov (UR) | Central | Central Black Earth | 27,134 | 1,540,486 | 56.77 | 1954 |
| 32 | Bryansk Oblast | Bryansk | Bryansk Oblast | | oblast | | Alexander Bogomaz (UR) | Central | Central | 34,857 | 1,169,161 | 33.54 | 1944 |
| 33 | Vladimir Oblast | Vladimir | Vladimirskaya Oblast | | oblast | | Aleksandr Avdeyev (UR, acting) | Central | Central | 29,084 | 1,348,134 | 46.35 | 1944 |
| 34 | Volgograd Oblast | Volgograd | Volgograd Oblast | | oblast | | Andrey Bocharov (Ind.) | Southern | Volga | 112,877 | 2,500,781 | 22.15 | 1937 |
| 35 | Vologda Oblast | Vologda (Largest city: Cherepovets) | Vologda oblast | | oblast | | Oleg Kuvshinnikov (UR) | Northwestern | Northern | 144,527 | 1,142,827 | 7.91 | 1937 |
| 36 | Voronezh Oblast | Voronezh | Voronezh Oblast | | oblast | | Aleksandr Gusev (UR) | Central | Central Black Earth | 52,216 | 2,308,792 | 44.22 | 1934 |
| 37 | Ivanovo Oblast | Ivanovo | Ivanovo Oblast | | oblast | | Stanislav Voskresensky (Ind.) | Central | Central | 21,437 | 927,828 | 43.28 | 1936 |
| 38 | Irkutsk Oblast | Irkutsk | Irkutsk Oblast | | oblast | | Igor Kobzev (Ind.) | Siberian | East Siberian | 774,846 | 2,370,102 | 3.06 | 1937 |
| 39 | Kaliningrad Oblast | Kaliningrad | Kaliningrad Oblast | | oblast | | Anton Alikhanov (UR) | Northwestern | Kaliningrad | 15,125 | 1,029,966 | 68.10 | 1946 |
| 40 | Kaluga Oblast | Kaluga | Kaluga Oblast | | oblast | | Vladislav Shapsha (UR) | Central | Central | 29,777 | 1,069,904 | 35.93 | 1944 |
| 41 | Kamchatka Krai | Petropavlovsk-Kamchatsky | Kamchatka Krai | | krai | | Vladimir Solodov (Ind.) | Far Eastern | Far Eastern | 464,275 | 291,705 | 0.63 | 2007 |
| 42 | Kemerovo Oblast | Kemerovo | Kemerovo oblast | | oblast | | Sergey Tsivilyov (UR) | Siberian | West Siberian | 95,725 | 2,600,923 | 27.17 | 1943 |
| 43 | Kirov Oblast | Kirov | Kirov Region | | oblast | | Aleksandr Sokolov (UR, acting) | Volga | Volga-Vyatka | 120,374 | 1,153,680 | 9.58 | 1934 |
| 44 | Kostroma Oblast | Kostroma | Kostroma Oblast | | oblast | | Sergey Sitnikov (Ind.) | Central | Central | 60,211 | 580,976 | 9.65 | 1944 |
| 45 | Kurgan Oblast | Kurgan | Kurgan Oblast | | oblast | | Vadim Shumkov (Ind.) | Ural | Ural | 71,488 | 776,661 | 10.86 | 1943 |
| 46 | Kursk Oblast | Kursk | Kursk Oblast | | oblast | | Roman Starovoyt (UR) | Central | Central Black Earth | 29,997 | 1,082,458 | 36.09 | 1934 |
| 47 | Leningrad Oblast | Largest city: Gatchina (Note: According to Article 13 of the Charter of Leningrad Oblast, the governing bodies of the oblast are located in the city of Saint Petersburg. However, Saint Petersburg is not officially the administrative centre of the oblast.) | Leningrad Oblast | | oblast | | Aleksandr Drozdenko (UR) | Northwestern | Northwestern | 83,908 | 2,000,997 | 23.85 | 1927 |
| 48 | Lipetsk Oblast | Lipetsk | Lipetsk Oblast | | oblast | | Igor Artamonov (UR) | Central | Central Black Earth | 24,047 | 1,143,224 | 47.54 | 1954 |
| 49 | Magadan Oblast | Magadan | Magadan Oblast | | oblast | | Sergey Nosov (UR) | Far Eastern | Far Eastern | 462,464 | 136,085 | 0.29 | 1953 |
| 50 | Moscow Oblast | Largest city: Balashikha (Note: According to Article 24 of the Charter of Moscow Oblast, the governing bodies of the oblast are located in the city of Moscow and throughout the territory of Moscow Oblast. However, Moscow is not officially the administrative centre of the oblast.) | Moscow Oblast | | oblast | | Andrey Vorobyov (UR) | Central | Central | 44,329 | 8,524,665 | 192.30 | 1929 |
| 51 | Murmansk Oblast | Murmansk | Murmansk Oblast | | oblast | | Andrey Chibis (UR) | Northwestern | Northern | 144,902 | 667,744 | 4.61 | 1938 |
| 52 | Nizhny Novgorod Oblast | Nizhny Novgorod | Nizhny Novgorod Region | | oblast | | Gleb Nikitin (UR) | Volga | Volga-Vyatka | 76,624 | 3,119,115 | 40.71 | 1936 |
| 53 | Novgorod Oblast | Veliky Novgorod | Novgorod Oblast | | oblast | | Aleksandr Dronov (UR) | Northwestern | Northwestern | 54,501 | 583,387 | 10.70 | 1944 |
| 54 | Novosibirsk Oblast | Novosibirsk | Novosibirsk Oblast | | oblast | | Andrey Travnikov (UR) | Siberian | West Siberian | 177,756 | 2,797,176 | 15.74 | 1937 |
| 55 | Omsk Oblast | Omsk | Omsk Oblast | | oblast | | Alexander Burkov (SRZP) | Siberian | West Siberian | 141,140 | 1,858,798 | 13.17 | 1934 |
| 56 | Orenburg Oblast | Orenburg | Orenburg Oblast | | oblast | | Denis Pasler (UR) | Volga | Ural | 123,702 | 1,862,767 | 15.06 | 1934 |
| 57 | Oryol Oblast | Oryol | Oryol Oblast | | oblast | | Andrey Klychkov (CPRF) | Central | Central | 24,652 | 713,374 | 28.94 | 1937 |
| 58 | Penza Oblast | Penza | Penza Oblast | | oblast | | Oleg Melnichenko (UR) | Volga | Volga | 43,352 | 1,266,348 | 29.21 | 1939 |
| 59 | Perm Krai | Perm | Perm Krai | | krai | | Dmitry Makhonin (Ind.) | Volga | Ural | 160,236 | 2,532,405 | 15.80 | 2005 |
| 60 | Pskov Oblast | Pskov | Pskov Oblast | | oblast | | Mikhail Vedernikov (UR) | Northwestern | Northwestern | 55,399 | 599,084 | 10.81 | 1944 |
| 61 | Rostov Oblast | Rostov-on-Don | Rostov Oblast | | oblast | | Vasily Golubev (UR) | Southern | North Caucasus | 100,967 | 4,200,729 | 41.60 | 1937 |
| 62 | Ryazan Oblast | Ryazan | Ryazan Oblast | | oblast | | Pavel Malkov (Ind.) | Central | Central | 39,605 | 1,102,810 | 27.85 | 1937 |
| 63 | Samara Oblast | Samara | Samara Oblast | | oblast | | Dmitry Azarov (UR) | Volga | Volga | 53,565 | 3,172,925 | 59.24 | 1928 |
| 64 | Saratov Oblast | Saratov | Saratov Oblast | | oblast | | Roman Busargin (UR) | Volga | Volga | 101,240 | 2,442,575 | 24.13 | 1936 |
| 65 | Sakhalin Oblast | Yuzhno-Sakhalinsk | Sakhalin Oblast | | oblast | | Valery Limarenko (UR) | Far Eastern | Far Eastern | 87,101 | 466,609 | 5.36 | 1947 |
| 66 | Sverdlovsk Oblast | Yekaterinburg | Sverdlovsk Oblast | | oblast | | Yevgeny Kuyvashev (UR) | Ural | Ural | 194,307 | 4,268,998 | 21.97 | 1935 |
| 67 | Smolensk Oblast | Smolensk | Smolensk oblast | | oblast | | Alexey Ostrovsky (LDPR) | Central | Central | 49,779 | 888,421 | 17.85 | 1937 |
| 68 | Tambov Oblast | Tambov | Tambov Oblast | | oblast | | Maksim Yegorov (UR, acting) | Central | Central Black Earth | 34,462 | 982,991 | 28.52 | 1937 |
| 69 | Tver Oblast | Tver | Tver Oblast | | oblast | | Igor Rudenya (UR) | Central | Central | 84,201 | 1,230,171 | 14.61 | 1935 |
| 70 | Tomsk Oblast | Tomsk | Tomsk Oblast | | oblast | | Vladimir Mazur (UR, acting) | Siberian | West Siberian | 314,391 | 1,062,666 | 3.38 | 1944 |
| 71 | Tula Oblast | Tula | Tula Oblast | | oblast | | Aleksey Dyumin (UR) | Central | Central | 25,679 | 1,501,214 | 58.46 | 1937 |
| 72 | Tyumen Oblast | Tyumen | Tyumen Oblast | | oblast | | Aleksandr Moor (UR) | Ural | West Siberian | 160,122 | 1,601,940 | 10.00 | 1944 |
| 73 | Ulyanovsk Oblast | Ulyanovsk | | | oblast | | Aleksey Russkikh (CPRF) | Volga | Volga | 37,181 | 1,196,745 | 32.19 | 1943 |
| 74 | Chelyabinsk Oblast | Chelyabinsk | Chelyabinsk Oblast | | oblast | | Aleksey Teksler (UR) | Ural | Ural | 88,529 | 3,431,224 | 38.76 | 1934 |
| 75 | Zabaykalsky Krai | Chita | Zabaykalsky Krai | | krai | | Aleksandr Osipov (Ind.) | Far Eastern | East Siberian | 431,892 | 1,004,125 | 2.32 | 2008 |
| 76 | Yaroslavl Oblast | Yaroslavl | Yaroslavl Oblast | | oblast | | Mikhail Yevrayev (Ind.) | Central | Central | 36,177 | 1,209,811 | 33.44 | 1936 |
| 77 | Moscow | | | | federal city | | Sergey Sobyanin (UR) | Central | Central | 2,561 | 13,010,112 | 5,080.09 | 1147 |
| 78 | Saint Petersburg | | Saint Petersburg Russia | | federal city | | Alexander Beglov (UR) | Northwestern | Northwestern | 1,403 | 5,601,911 | 3,992.81 | 1703 |
| 79 | Jewish Autonomous Oblast | Birobidzhan | Jewish Autonomous Oblast | | autonomous oblast | Jews | Rostislav Goldstein (UR) | Far Eastern | Far Eastern | 36,271 | 150,453 | 4.15 | 1934 |
| 80 | Nenets Autonomous Okrug | Naryan-Mar | Nenets Autonomous District | | autonomous okrug | Nenets | Yury Bezdudny (UR) | Northwestern | Northern | 176,810 | 41,434 | 0.23 | 1929 |
| 81 | Khanty–Mansi Autonomous Okrug – Yugra | Khanty-Mansiysk (Largest city: Surgut) | Yugra | | autonomous okrug | Khanty, Mansi | Natalya Komarova (UR) | Ural | West Siberian | 534,801 | 1,711,480 | 3.20 | 1930 |
| 82 | Chukotka Autonomous Okrug | Anadyr | Chukotka | | autonomous okrug | Chukchi | Roman Kopin (UR) | Far Eastern | Far Eastern | 721,481 | 47,490 | 0.07 | 1930 |
| 83 | Yamalo-Nenets Autonomous Okrug | Salekhard (Largest city: Novy Urengoy) | Yamal-Nenets Autonomous District | | autonomous okrug | Nenets | Dmitry Artyukhov (UR) | Ural | West Siberian | 769,250 | 510,490 | 0.66 | 1930 |

Contested territories situated within the internationally-recognised borders of Ukraine
| Code | Name | Capital/ administrative centre | Flag | Coat of arms | Type | Head of subject | Federal district | Economic region | Area (km^{2}) | Population | | Est. |
| Code | Name | Capital/ administrative centre | Flag | Coat of arms | Type | Head of subject | Federal district | Economic region | Area (km^{2}) | Total | Density (per km^{2}) | Est. |
|---|---|---|---|---|---|---|---|---|---|---|---|---|
| 84 | Republic of Crimea (Note: Internationally-recognised as part of Ukraine.) | Simferopol | Crimea | | republic | Sergey Aksyonov (UR) | Southern | North Caucasus | 26,081 | 1,934,630 | 74.18 | 2014 |
| 85 | Sevastopol | Sevastopol | | | federal city | Mikhail Razvozhayev (UR) | Southern | North Caucasus | 864 | 547,820 | 634.05 | 2014 |
| 86 | Donetsk People's Republic (Note: Claimed, but only partially controlled by Russia.) | Donetsk | Donetsk People's Republic | | republic | Denis Pushilin (UR/ODDR) | Southern | Central Black Earth | 26,517 (Note: As Russia only partially controls the region, this is a claimed figure.) | 4,100,280 | 154.63 | 2022 |
| 87 | Luhansk People's Republic | Luhansk | Luhansk People's Republic | | republic | Leonid Pasechnik (UR/ML) | Southern | Central Black Earth | 26,684 | 2,121,322 | 79.50 | 2022 |
| 88 | Zaporozhye Oblast | Melitopol | Russian administered Zaporizhzhia Oblast | | oblast | Yevgeny Balitsky (UR) | Southern | North Caucasus | 27,183 | 1,666,515 | 61.31 | 2022 |
| 89 | Kherson Oblast | Henichesk (de facto); Kherson (claimed) | Kherson Oblast | | oblast | Vladimir Saldo (Ind.) | Southern | North Caucasus | 28,461 | 1,016,707 | 35.72 | 2022 |

== Administrative divisions ==
Prior to the adoption of the 1993 Constitution of Russia, the administrative-territorial structure of Russia was regulated by the Decree of the Presidium of the Supreme Soviet of the RSFSR of 17 August 1982 "On the Procedures of Dealing with the Matters of the Administrative-Territorial Structure of the RSFSR". The 1993 Constitution, however, did not identify the matters of the administrative-territorial divisions as the responsibility of the federal government nor as the joint responsibility of the federal government and the subjects. This was interpreted by the governments of the federal subjects as a sign that the matters of the administrative-territorial divisions became solely the responsibility of the federal subjects. As a result, the modern administrative-territorial structures of the federal subjects vary significantly from one federal subject to another. While the implementation details may be considerably different, in general, however, the following types of high-level administrative divisions are recognised:

- administrative districts (raions)
- cities/towns and urban-type settlements of federal subject significance
- closed administrative-territorial formations

Autonomous okrugs and okrugs are intermediary units of administrative divisions, which include some of the federal subject's districts and cities/towns/urban-type settlements of federal subject significance.

- Autonomous okrugs, while being under the jurisdiction of another federal subject, are still constitutionally recognised as federal subjects on their own right. Chukotka Autonomous Okrug is an exception in that it is not administratively subordinated to any other federal subject of Russia.
- Okrugs are usually former autonomous okrugs that lost their federal subject status due to a merger with another federal subject.

Typical lower-level administrative divisions include:

- selsoviets (rural councils)
- towns and urban-type settlements of the administrative district significance
- city districts

== Municipal divisions ==
In the course of the Russian municipal reform of 2004–2005, all federal subjects of Russia were to streamline the structures of local self-government, which is guaranteed by the Constitution of Russia. The reform mandated that each federal subject was to have a unified structure of municipal government bodies by 1 January 2005, and a law enforcing the reform provisions went into effect on 1 January 2006. According to the law, the units of the municipal division (called "municipal formations") are as follows:

- Municipal district, a group of urban and rural settlements, often along with the inter-settlement territories. In practice, municipal districts are usually formed within the boundaries of existing administrative districts (raions).
  - Urban settlement (Russia), a city/town or an urban-type settlement, possibly together with adjacent rural and/or urban localities
  - Rural settlement (Russia), one or several rural localities
- Urban okrug, an urban settlement not incorporated into a municipal district. In practice, urban okrugs are usually formed within the boundaries of existing cities of federal subject significance.
- Intra-urban territory (intra-urban municipal formation) of a federal city, a part of a federal city's territory. In Moscow, these are called municipal formations (which correspond to districts); in St. Petersburg—municipal okrugs, towns, and settlements. In Sevastopol (located on the Crimean Peninsula, which is a territory disputed between Russia and Ukraine), they are known as municipal okrugs and a town.

Territories not included as a part of municipal formations are known as inter-settlement territories, a concept introduced in 2019.

The Federal Law was amended on 27 May 2014 to include new types of municipal divisions:

- Urban okrug with intra-urban divisions, an urban okrug divided into intra-urban districts at the lower level of the municipal hierarchy
  - Intra-urban district, a municipal formation within an urban okrug with intra-urban divisions. This municipal formation type would typically be established within the borders of existing city districts (i.e., the administrative divisions in some of the cities of federal subject significance).

In June 2014, Chelyabinsky Urban Okrug became the first urban okrug to implement intra-urban divisions.

Federal legislation introduced on 1 May 2019, added an additional territorial unit:

- Municipal okrug, a grouping of several settlements without municipal status. Municipal okrugs formally exercise local self-government either through direct means or through electoral and other institutions.

== Economic regions ==
Central-Chernozem Economic Region Central Economic Region East Siberia Economic Region Far East Economic Region Kaliningrad Economic Region North Caucasus Economic Region North Economic Region Northwest Economic Region Ural Economic Region Volga Economic Region Volga-Vyatka Economic Region West Siberia Economic Region

For economic and statistical purposes the federal subjects are grouped into twelve economic regions. Economic regions and their parts sharing common economic trends are in turn grouped into economic zones and macrozones.

| Economic region | Population (2021) | Area (km^{2}) | GDP (million US$) |
|---|---|---|---|
| Central | 33,276,581 | 482,300 | 611,550 |
| Central Black Earth | 7,057,951 | 167,900 | 62,098 |
| East Siberian | 6,096,127 | 3,371,800 | 73,250 |
| Far Eastern | 7,975,762 | 6,952,600 | 100,286 |
| Kaliningrad | 1,029,966 | 15,100 | 10,600 |
| North Caucasus | 22,642,000 | 381,600 | 145,110 |
| Northern | 4,101,852 | 1,476,600 | 69,754 |
| Northwestern | 8,785,379 | 195,200 | 192,610 |
| Ural | 18,416,392 | 823,300 | 154,034 |
| Volga | 15,811,458 | 539,800 | 128,221 |
| Volga-Vyatka | 6,968,440 | 264,800 | 44,635 |
| West Siberian | 16,281,060 | 2,454,000 | 234,600 |

== Military districts ==
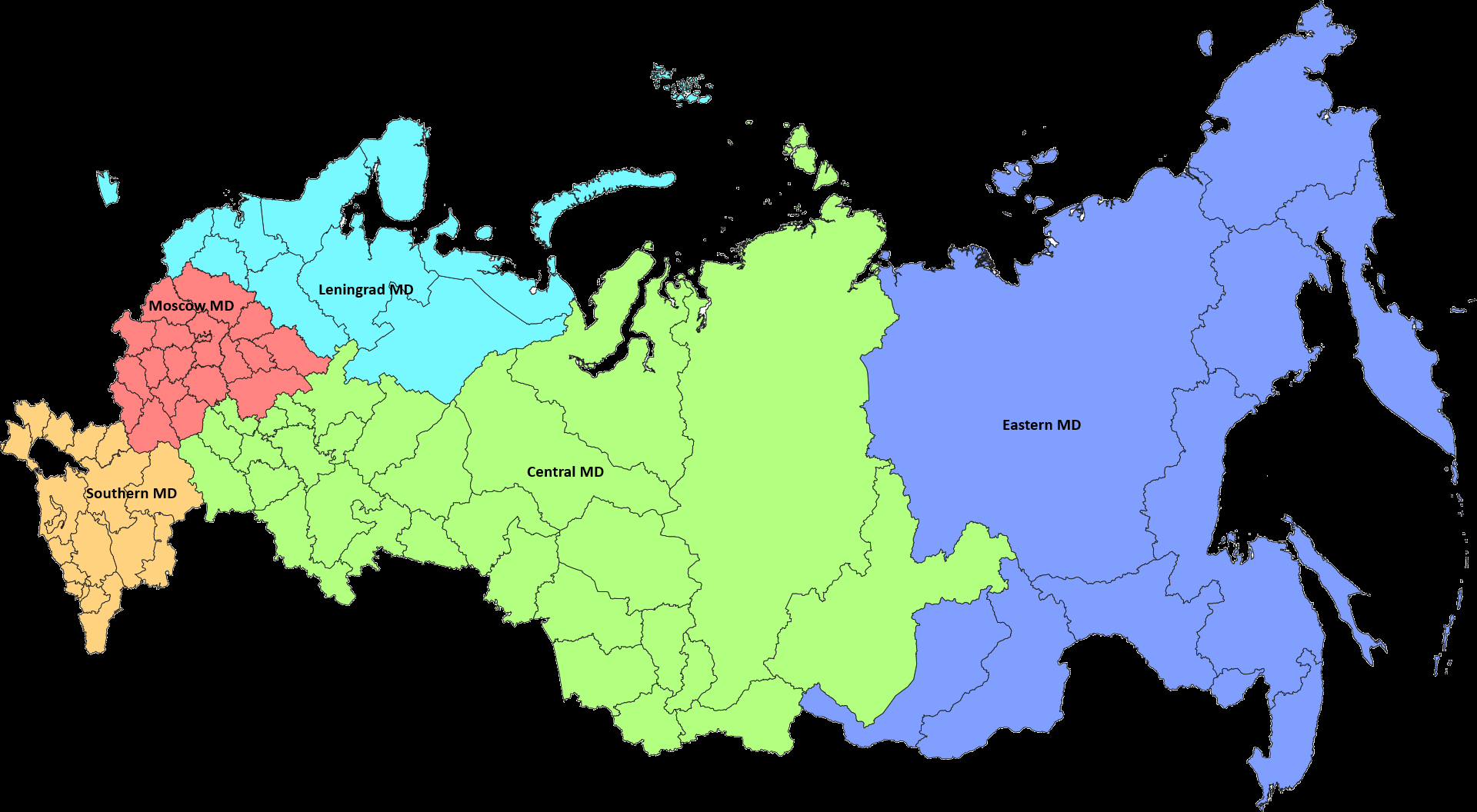
Military districts of Russia as of 2024 Leningrad Military District Eastern Military District Central Military District Southern Military District Moscow Military District

In order for the Armed Forces to provide an efficient management of military units, their training, and other operational activities, the federal subjects are grouped into five military districts. Each military district operates under the command of the district headquarters, headed by the district commander, and is subordinated to the General Staff of the Armed Forces of the Russian Federation.

== See also ==
- History of the administrative division of Russia
- List of federal subjects of Russia by area
- List of federal subjects of Russia by population
- Types of inhabited localities in Russia
- Republics of the Soviet Union
- Constituencies of Russia

== Sources ==
- 12 декабря 1993 г. «Конституция Российской Федерации», в ред. Федерального конституционного закона №7-ФКЗ от 30 декабря 2008 г. Вступил в силу со дня официального опубликования. Опубликован: "Российская газета", №237, 25 декабря 1993 г. (December 12, 1993 Constitution of the Russian Federation, as amended by the Federal Constitutional Law #7-FKZ of December 30, 2008. Effective as of the official publication date.).
- Законодательное Собрание города Севастополя. Закон №17-ЗС от 3 июня 2014 г. «Об установлении границ и статусе муниципальных образований в городе Севастополе». Вступил в силу через 10 дней со дня официального опубликования. (Legislative Assembly of the City of Sevastopol. Law #17-ZS of June 3, 2014 On Establishing the Borders and the Status of the Municipal Formations in the City of Sevastopol. Effective as of the day which is 10 days after the day of the official publication.).
