= Federal cities of Russia =

Type of federal subject of Russia

In the Russian Federation, a city of federal importance (Russian: город федерального значения, romanized: gorod federalnogo znacheniya), also known as a federal city, is a city that has a status of both an inhabited locality and a constituent federal subject. Russia has three federal cities: Moscow, Saint Petersburg, and Sevastopol, which was annexed in 2014 but remains internationally recognised as part of Ukraine.

Moscow and Saint Petersburg are the largest cities in the country: Moscow is the national capital and Saint Petersburg is a former Russian capital and an important port city by the Baltic Sea. Currently, Sevastopol houses the Sevastopol Naval Base, the main port of the Russian Black Sea Fleet.

Map #	Code	ISO code	Name	Flag	Coat of arms	Federal district	Economic region	Area (km^{2})	Population (2017 est.)
1	77	RU-MOW	Moscow	Moscow, Russia		Central	Central	2,561.5	12,506,468
2	78	RU-SPE	Saint Petersburg	Saint Petersburg Russia		Northwestern	Northwestern	1,439	5,351,935
3	92	UA-40	Sevastopol (Note: Annexed by Russia in 2014; recognized internationally as a part of Ukraine.)			Southern	North Caucasus	864	436,670

== See also ==
- Jewish Autonomous Oblast
- Krais of Russia
- Oblasts of Russia
- Republics of Russia
- Sirius, the only designated federal territory in Russia
