= Vicatia =

Scientific classification
- Kingdom: Plantae
- Clade: Tracheophytes
- Clade: Angiosperms
- Clade: Eudicots
- Clade: Asterids
- Order: Apiales
- Family: Apiaceae
- Subfamily: Apioideae
- Tribe: Selineae
- Genus: Vicatia; DC.

Genus of flowering plants

Vicatia is a genus of flowering plants belonging to the family Apiaceae. It is also in tribe Selineae.

Its native range stretches from Afghanistan, through Central Asia (within Kazakhstan, Kyrgyzstan Tajikistan, and Uzbekistan), parts of the Indian subcontinent (Assam, Nepal, Pakistan, West and East Himalaya), China (South-Central, Qinghai, Tibet and Xinjiang) and up to parts of Siberia, within Altai; (Altai Krai and Altai Republic), Krasnoyarsk and West Siberia.

== Known species ==
As accepted by Kew:

- Vicatia atrosanguinea (Kar. & Kir.) P.K.Mukh. & Pimenov
- Vicatia coniifolia DC.
- Vicatia nepalensis Kljuykov
- Vicatia thibetica H.Boissieu
- Vicatia wolffiana (Fedde ex H.Wolff) C.Norman

== Taxonomy ==
The genus name of Vicatia is in honour of Philippe-Rodolphe Vicat (1742–1783), a Swiss doctor and botanist in Warsaw, Poland, and also Lausanne, Switzerland. It was first described and published in Prodr. Vol.4 on page 243 in 1830.
