= Central Economic Region =

Central Economic Region Центральный экономический район (Russian)
- Economic region
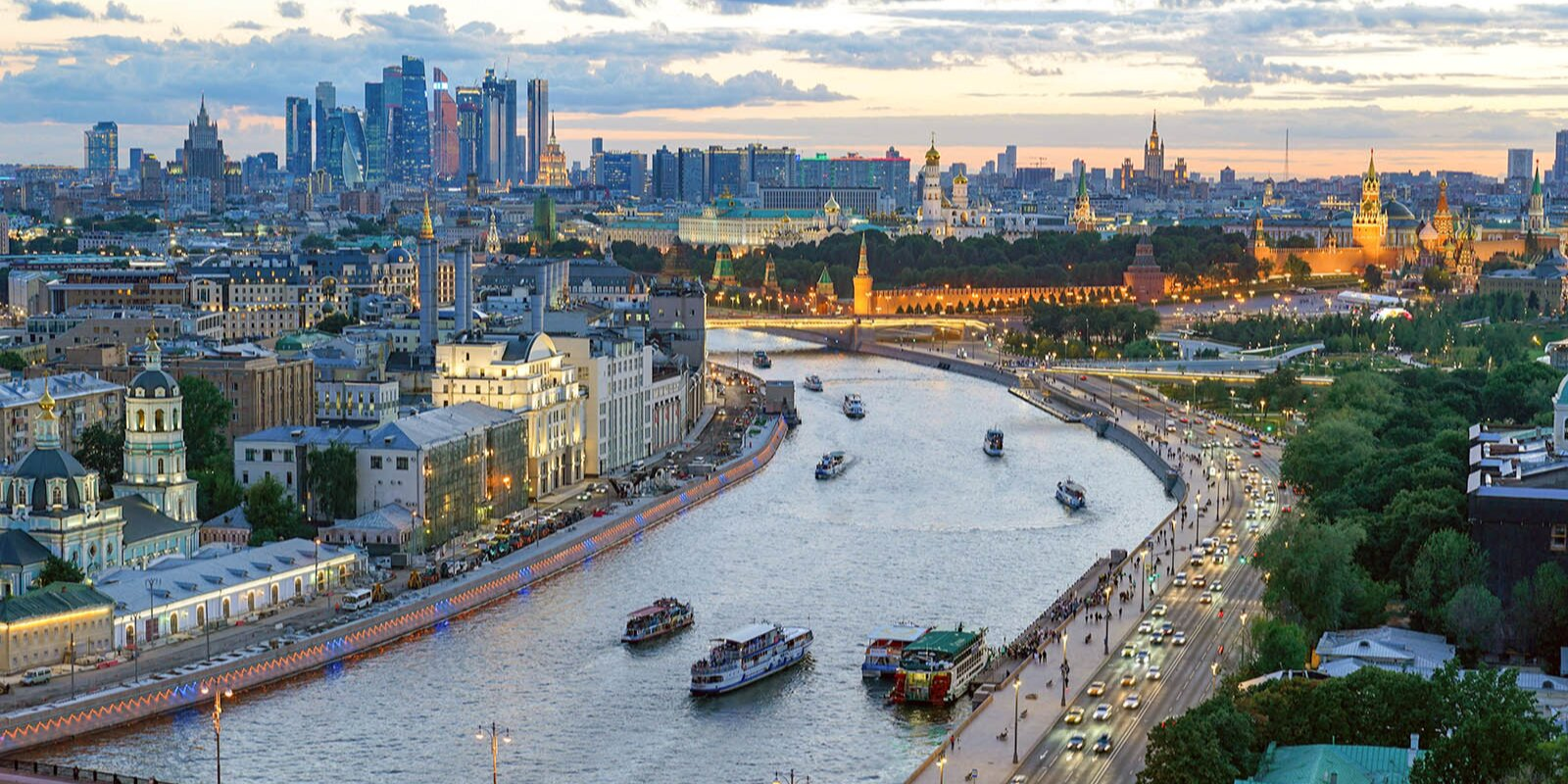
- Moscow, the largest city in the region

- Map of Central Economic Region
- Country: Russia

Area
  - Total: 484,000 km^{2} (187,000 sq mi)

Population (2021)
  - Total: 33,276,581
  - Density: 68.8/km^{2} (178/sq mi)

GDP
  - Total: ₽ 42,746 billion US$ 611.550 billion (2022)

The Central Economic Region (Note: Russian: Центральный экономический район, romanized: Tsentral'nyy ekonomicheskyy rayon, IPA: [tsɨnˈtralʲnɨj ɪkənɐˈmʲitɕɪskʲɪj rɐˈjɵn]) is one of twelve economic regions of Russia.

Central Economic Region is located in the central portion of the European part of Russia. A great number of automobile and railroads intersect on the territory of this region.

This flat, rolling country, with Moscow as its center, forms a major industrial region. Besides Moscow, major cities include Smolensk, Yaroslavl, Vladimir, Tula, Dzerzhinsky, and Rybinsk. Trucks, ships, railway rolling stock, machine tools, electronic equipment, cotton and woolen textiles, and chemicals are the principal industrial products. The Volga and Oka Rivers are the major water routes, and the Moscow–Volga and Don–Volga canals link Moscow with the Caspian and Baltic Seas. Many rail lines serve the area.

== Composition ==
The Central Economic Region comprises the following federal subjects, all of which are in the Central Federal District:

- Bryansk Oblast
- Ivanovo Oblast
- Kaluga Oblast
- Kostroma Oblast
- Moscow Oblast
- Oryol Oblast
- Ryazan Oblast
- Smolensk Oblast
- Tula Oblast
- Tver Oblast
- Vladimir Oblast
- Yaroslavl Oblast
- Federal city of Moscow

== Economy ==
The Central Economic Region accounted for almost 32 per cent of the Russia's GRP in 2008. The region specializes in machine building, chemical and textile industries. Long-fibered flax, potatoes, and vegetables are the most typical of the region's agriculture. Cattle breeding for milking is also common.

The machine building industry is mostly science-intensive. Instrument-making, radio, electrotechnic, and electronic production prevail. Companies manufacturing metal-working machines and instruments, steam boilers, turbines, current generators, and electric motors are concentrated in this region.

Cities of Bryansk, Moscow, and Serpukhov are the centers of car-building industry. Trains and train cars are manufactured in Kolomna, Lyudinovo, and Murom. Rybinsk is a shipbuilding center of the region. Tractors and other agricultural machinery are produced in Bezhetsk, Lyubertsy, Ryazan, Tula, and Vladimir.

Chemical industry includes the production of synthetic plastics (in Moscow, Novomoskovsk, Orekhovo-Zuyevo, Vladimir), chemical fibers (in Klin, Ryazan, Tver), rubber resin and tires (in Moscow, Yaroslavl, Yefremov), and fertilizers (in Dorgobuzh, Novomoskovsk, Polpino, Shchyokino, Voskresensk).

Textile industry is the traditional industry of the region. Most of the production is concentrated in Ivanovo, Kostroma, and Moscow Oblasts, manufacturing a wide variety of fabrics.

While the region imports most of the raw metals, metallurgy is still somewhat developed. There are metallurgical plants in Elektrostal, Moscow, and in Tula Oblast.

Electric power is generated by fossil fuels and nuclear power plants. Fossil fuel (oil, natural gas, coal) are mostly imported from other regions of Russia (mostly from Komi Republic, Povolzhye, and West Siberia).

Other developed industries include manufacturing of footwear, pottery (including porcelain), glass, cement, construction materials, as well as food and wood processing industries.

Region's temperate zone climate allows for growing of a great variety of crops. As the soils are mostly of podsolic and grey forest types, melioration and fertilizing are often employed to improve the crop yields.

== Natural resources ==
Most common natural resources of the region include phosphorites, brown coal (in Moscow Oblast), construction materials, and peat (Moscow, Tver, and Yaroslavl Oblasts).
