= Northwestern Federal District =

Coordinates: 59°57′N 30°19′E

Northwestern Federal District Северо-Западный федеральный округ
- Federal district of Russia
- Location of the Northwestern Federal District
- Interactive map of Northwestern Federal District
- Established: 13 May 2000
- Administrative centre: Saint Petersburg

Government
  - Presidential Envoy: Igor Rudenya

Area
  - Total: 1,686,972 km^{2} (651,344 sq mi)
  - Rank: 4th

Population (2021)
  - Total: 13,917,197
  - Rank: 5th
  - Density: 8.249809/km^{2} (21.36691/sq mi)

GDP (nominal, 2024)
  - Total: ₽22.6 trillion (US$265.18 billion)
  - Per capita: ₽1.63 million (US$19,134.9)
- Federal subjects: 11 contained
- Economic regions: 3 contained
- HDI (2022): 0.822 very high · 1st
- Website: szfo.gov.ru

Northwestern Federal District in Russia

The Northwestern Federal District (Note: Russian: Северо-Западный федеральный округ, romanized: Severo-Zapadnyy federal'nyy okrug, IPA: [ˌsʲevʲɪrə ˈzapədnɨj fʲɪdʲɪˈralʲnɨj ˈokrʊk]) is one of the eight federal districts of Russia. It covers most of Northwest Russia. Its population was 13.6 million, of which 83.5% was urban, living in an area of 1,687,000 square kilometers (651,000 sq mi), according to the 2010 Census. The current Envoy to the Northwestern Federal District is Aleksandr Gutsan, who was appointed to the post after previously serving as Deputy Prosecutor General. He replaced former Envoy Alexander Beglov, who was removed from the position and made acting Governor of Saint Petersburg.

== Demographics ==
Population pyramid as of the 2021 Russian Census

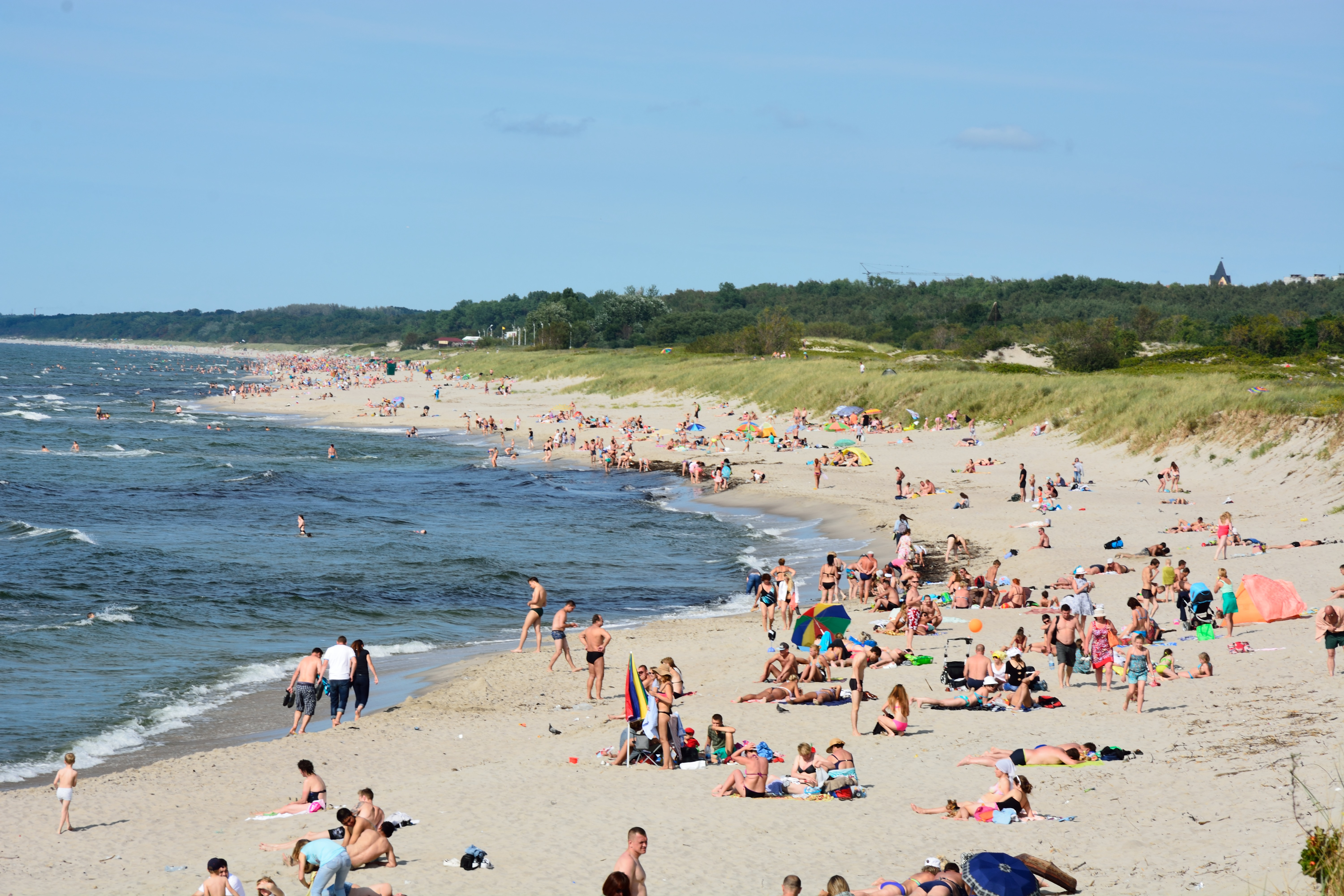
Baltiysk Beach, Kaliningrad Oblast

=== Federal subjects ===
The district comprises the Northern, Northwestern and Kaliningrad economic regions and eleven federal subjects:

Northwestern Federal District
#	Flag	Coat of Arms	Federal subject	Area in km^{2}	Population (2021)	GDP	Capital/Administrative center	Map of Administrative Division
1			Arkhangelsk Oblast	589,900 (Note: Includes the area of Nenets Autonomous Okrug. The area of Arkhangelsk Oblast proper is 413,100 square kilometres (159,500 sq mi).)	978,873	₽649 billion	Arkhangelsk	
2			Vologda Oblast	144,500	1,142,827	₽1,010 billion	Vologda	
3			Kaliningrad Oblast	15,100	1,029,966	₽675 billion	Kaliningrad	
4			Republic of Karelia	180,500	533,121	₽447 billion	Petrozavodsk	
5			Komi Republic	416,800	737,853	₽857 billion	Syktyvkar	
6			Leningrad Oblast	83,900	2,000,997	₽1,481 billion	Gatchina	
7			Murmansk Oblast	144,900	667,744	₽1,084 billion	Murmansk	
8			Nenets Autonomous Okrug	176,800	41,434	₽407 billion	Naryan-Mar	
9			Novgorod Oblast	54,500	583,387	₽342 billion	Veliky Novgorod	
10			Pskov Oblast	55,400	599,084	₽220 billion	Pskov	
11			Saint Petersburg	1,400	5,601,911	₽9,440 billion	Saint Petersburg	

According to the results of the 2021 census, the ethnic composition of the Northwestern Federal District is as follows:

Ethnicity	Population	Percentage
Russians	10,884,244	91.30%
Komi	132,823	1.11%
Ukrainians	100,030	0.84%
Belarusians	58,577	0.49%
Tatars	42,421	0.36%
Armenians	38,211	0.32%
Azerbaijanis	34,532	0.29%
Karelians	28,257	0.24%
Uzbeks	28,241	0.24%
Tajiks	21,577	0.18%
Jews	11,960	0.10%
Others	540,773	4.54%
Ethnicity not stated	1,995,551	–

Vital statistics for 2022:

- Births: 113,637 (8.2 per 1,000)
- Deaths: 186,074 (13.4 per 1,000)

Total fertility rate (2025):

1.21 children per woman

Life expectancy (2021):

70.37 years

== Presidential plenipotentiary envoys ==
No.	Name (envoy)	Photo	Term of office			Appointed by
No.	Name (envoy)	Photo	Start of term	End of term	Length of service	Appointed by
1	Viktor Cherkesov		18 May 2000	11 March 2003	2 years, 297 days (1,027 days)	Vladimir Putin
2	Valentina Matviyenko		11 March 2003	15 October 2003	220 days	Vladimir Putin
3	Ilya Klebanov		1 November 2003	6 September 2011	7 years, 309 days (2,866 days)	Vladimir Putin
4	Nikolay Vinnichenko		6 September 2011	11 March 2014	2 years, 186 days (917 days)	Dmitry Medvedev
5	Vladimir Bulavin		11 March 2014	28 July 2016	2 years, 139 days (870 days)	Vladimir Putin
6	Nikolay Tsukanov		28 July 2016	25 December 2017	1 year, 150 days (515 days)	Vladimir Putin
7	Alexander Beglov		25 December 2017	3 October 2018	282 days	Vladimir Putin
8	Aleksandr Gutsan		7 November 2018	24 September 2025	6 years, 321 days (2,513 days)	Vladimir Putin
9	Igor Rudenya		29 September 2025	present	405 days	Vladimir Putin

== See also ==
- List of largest cities in Northwestern Federal District (in Russian)
- Novgorod Republic which contained most of the current federal district
