= Siberian Federal District =

Federal District of Russia

Siberian Federal District Сибирский федеральный округ
- Federal district
- The geographical location of the Siberian Federal District
- Interactive map of Siberian Federal District
- Country: Russia
- Established: 13 May 2000
- Administrative centre: Novosibirsk

Government
  - Presidential Envoy: Anatoly Seryshev

Area
  - Total: 4,361,800 km^{2} (1,684,100 sq mi)
  - Rank: 2nd

Population (2021)
  - Total: 16,800,947
  - Rank: 3rd
  - Density: 3.8518/km^{2} (9.9762/sq mi)

GDP (nominal, 2024)
  - Total: ₽16.29 trillion (US$221.22 billion)
  - Per capita: ₽985,653 (US$13,382.93)

Time zones
- Omsk Oblast: UTC+06:00 (Omsk Time)
- Krasnoyarsk Oblast and others: UTC+07:00 (Krasnoyarsk Time)
- Irkutsk Oblast: UTC+08:00 (Irkutsk Time)
- Federal subjects: 10 contained
- Economic regions: 2 contained
- HDI (2022): 0.768 high · 6th
- Website: SFO.gov.ru

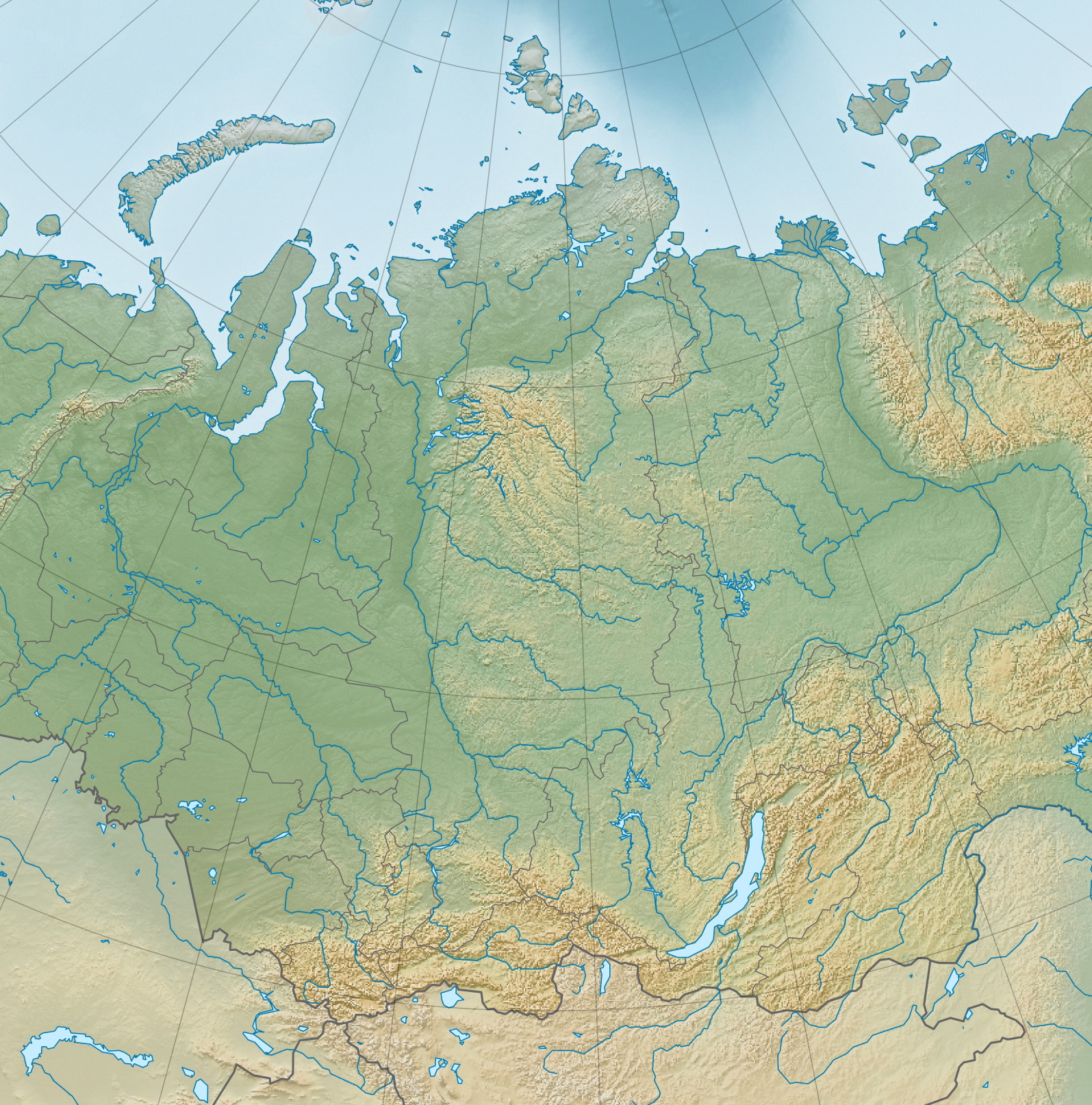
Siberian Federal District in Russia

The Siberian Federal District (Note: Russian: Сибирский федеральный округ, romanized: Sibirskiy federal'nyy okrug, IPA: [sʲɪˈbʲirskʲɪj fʲɪdʲɪˈralʲnɨj ˈokrʊk]) is one of the eight federal districts of Russia. The entire federal district lies within the continent of Asia.

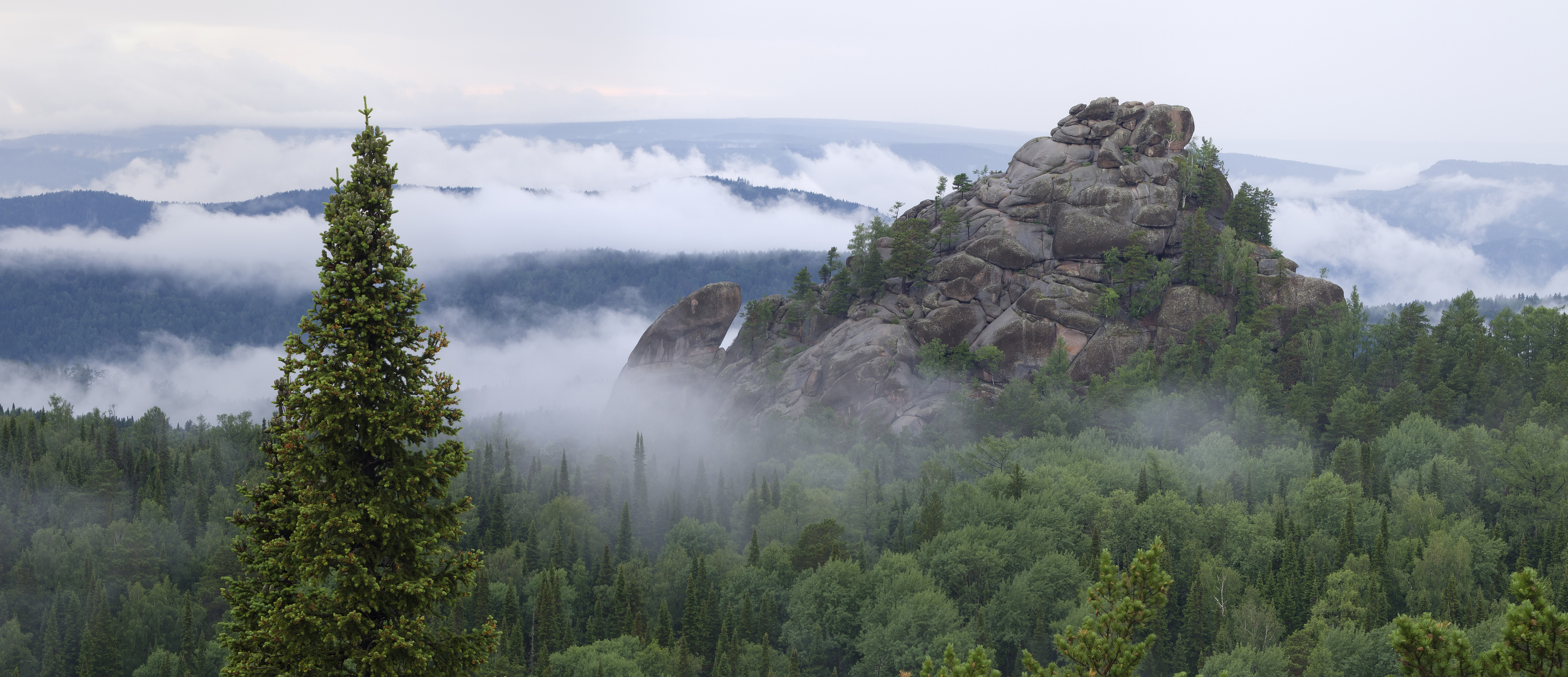
Krasnoyarsk Krai

The district was created by presidential decree on 13 May 2000, and covers around 30% of the total land area of Russia. Its population was 16,800,947 according to the 2021 Census, living in an area of 4,361,800 square kilometres (1,684,100 sq mi). In November 2018, Buryatia and Zabaykalsky Krai were removed from the Siberian Federal District and added to the Far Eastern Federal District in accordance with a decree issued by Russian President Vladimir Putin.

== Demographics ==
Population pyramid as of the 2021 Russian Census

=== Federal subjects ===
The district comprises the West Siberian (part) and East Siberian economic regions and ten federal subjects:

#	Flag	Coat of arms	Federal subject	Area [km^{2}]	Population (2021)	GDP[billion]	Capital/adm. centre	Map of administrative division
1			Altai Republic	92,900	210,924	₽71	Gorno-Altaysk	
2			Altai Krai	168,000	2,163,693	₽845	Barnaul	
3			Irkutsk Oblast	774,800	2,370,102	₽1,924	Irkutsk	
4			Kemerovo Oblast	95,700	2,600,923	₽1,807	Kemerovo	
5			Krasnoyarsk Krai	2,366,800	2,856,971	₽3,065	Krasnoyarsk	
6			Novosibirsk Oblast	177,800	2,797,176	₽1,617	Novosibirsk	
7			Omsk Oblast	141,100	1,858,798	₽854	Omsk	
8			Tomsk Oblast	314,400	1,062,666	₽706	Tomsk	
9			Tuva Republic	168,600	336,651	₽89	Kyzyl	
10			Republic of Khakassia	61,600	534,795	₽308	Abakan	

Historical population
Year	Pop.	±%
1959	15,102,916	—
1970	16,209,665	+7.3%
1979	17,094,856	+5.5%
1989	18,658,624	+9.1%
2002	17,926,354	−3.9%
2010	17,178,298	−4.2%
2021	16,800,947	−2.2%
Source: Census data

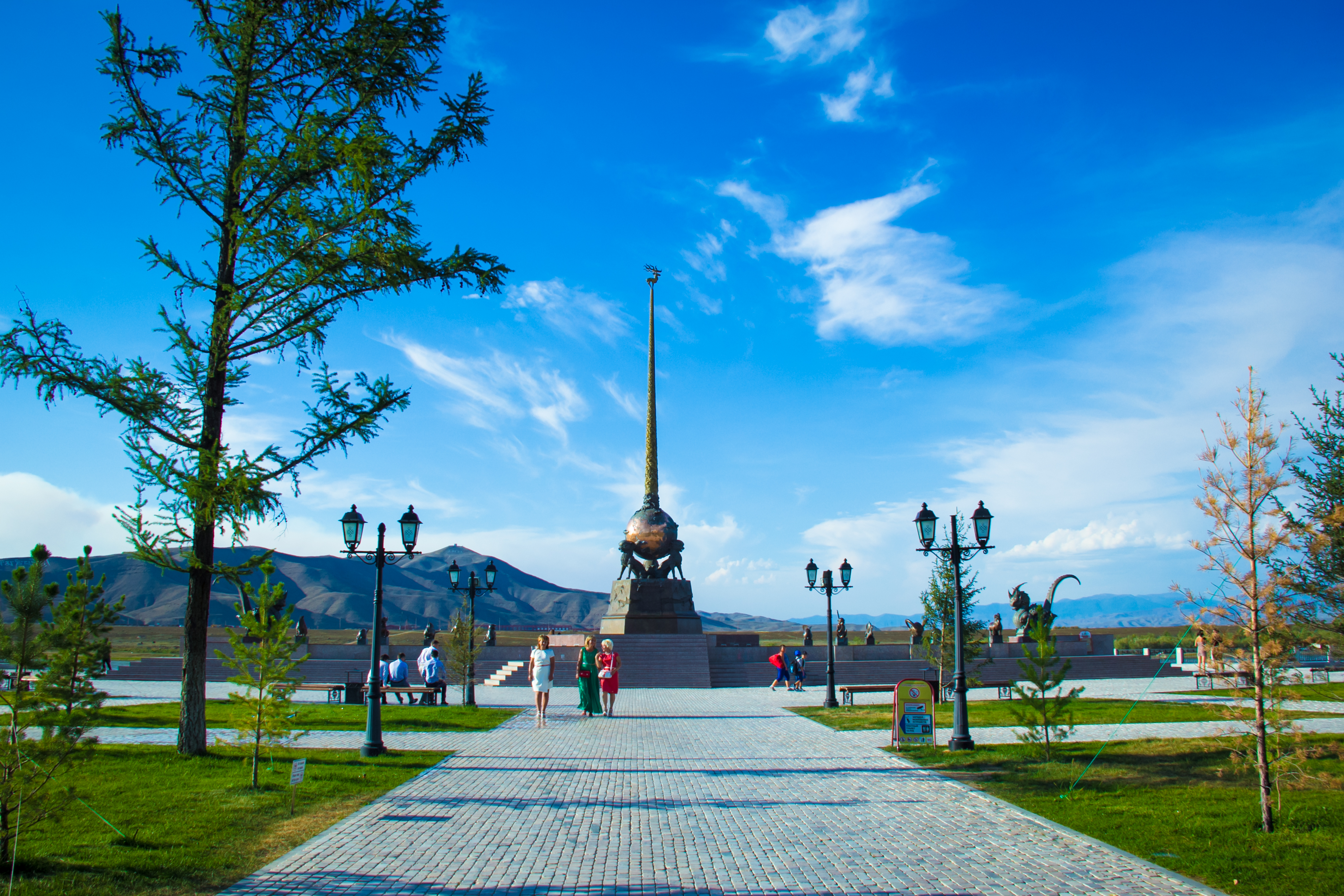
The geographic "centre of Asia", Tuva Republic

=== Religion and ethnicity ===
Religion in the Siberian Federal District as of 2012 (Sreda Arena Atlas)
Russian Orthodoxy	28.9%
Other Orthodox	1.9%
Other Christians	5.2%
Islam	1.4%
Buddhism	1.2%
Native faiths	1.6%
Spiritual but not religious	33.2%
Atheism and irreligion	18.7%
Other and undeclared	7.9%

According to a 2012 survey, 28.9% of the population of the current federal subjects of the Siberian Federal District (excluding Buryatia and Zabaykalsky Krai) adhere to the Russian Orthodox Church, 5.2% are unaffiliated generic Christians, 1.9% are Orthodox believers without belonging to any church or adhere to other (non-Russian) Orthodox churches, 1.4% are Muslim, 1.2% are Buddhist, and 1.6% adhere to some native faith such as Rodnovery, Tengrism, or Tuvan Shamanism. In addition, 33.2% of the population declare to be "spiritual but not religious", 18.7% are atheist, and 7.9% follow other religions or did not give an answer to the question.

Ethnic map of the Siberian Federal District by urban and rural settlements, 2010 census

Ethnic composition, according to the 2010 census:

- Total – 19,256,426
- Russians – 16,542,506 (85.91%)
- Buryats – 442,794 (2.30%)
- Tuvans – 259,971 (1.35%)
- Ukrainians – 227,353 (1.18%)
- Tatars – 204,321 (1.06%)
- Germans – 198,109 (1.03%)
- Kazakhs – 117,507 (0.61%)
- Altaians – 72,841 (0.38%)
- Khakass — 70,859 (0.37%)
- Armenians – 63,091 (0.33%)
- Azerbaijanis – 54,762 (0.28%)
- Belarusians – 47 829 (0.25%)
- Uzbeks – 41,799 (0.22%)
- Chuvash – 40,527 (0.21%)
- Tajiks – 32,419 (0.17%)
- Kyrgyz — 30,871 (0.16%)
- Mordva – 19,238 (0.10%)
- Roma – 15,162 (0.08%)
- Bashkirs – 12 929 (0.07%)
- Shors – 12 397 (0.06%)
- Koreans – 11,193 (0.06%)
- Moldovans – 11 155 (0.06%)
- Evenks – 10,243 (0.05%)
- Jews – 9,642 (0.05%)
- Mari – 9,116 (0.05%)
- Chinese — 9,075 (0.05%)
- Udmurts – 8,822 (0.05%)
- Poles – 8,435 (0.04%)
- Georgians – 7,884 (0.04%)
- Estonians – 7,112 (0.04%)
- Dolgans – 5,854 (0.03%)
- Persons who did not indicate nationality – 561,206 (2.91%)

== Presidential plenipotentiary envoys ==
No.	Name (envoy)	Photo	Term of office			Appointed by
No.	Name (envoy)	Photo	Start of term	End of term	Length of service	Appointed by
1	Leonid Drachevsky		18 May 2000	9 September 2004	4 years, 114 days (1,575 days)	Vladimir Putin
2	Anatoly Kvashnin		9 September 2004	9 September 2010	6 years, 0 days	Vladimir Putin
3	Viktor Tolokonsky		9 September 2010	12 May 2014	3 years, 245 days (1,341 days)	Dmitry Medvedev
4	Nikolay Rogozhkin		12 May 2014	28 July 2016	2 years, 77 days (808 days)	Vladimir Putin
5	Sergey Menyaylo		28 July 2016	9 April 2021	4 years, 255 days (1,716 days)	Vladimir Putin
6	Anatoly Seryshev		12 October 2021	present	4 years, 361 days (1,822 days)	Vladimir Putin

== See also ==
- Siberia
