= Volga-Vyatka Economic Region =

Economic region in Russia

Volga-Vyatka Economic Region Волго-Вятский экономический район
- Economic region
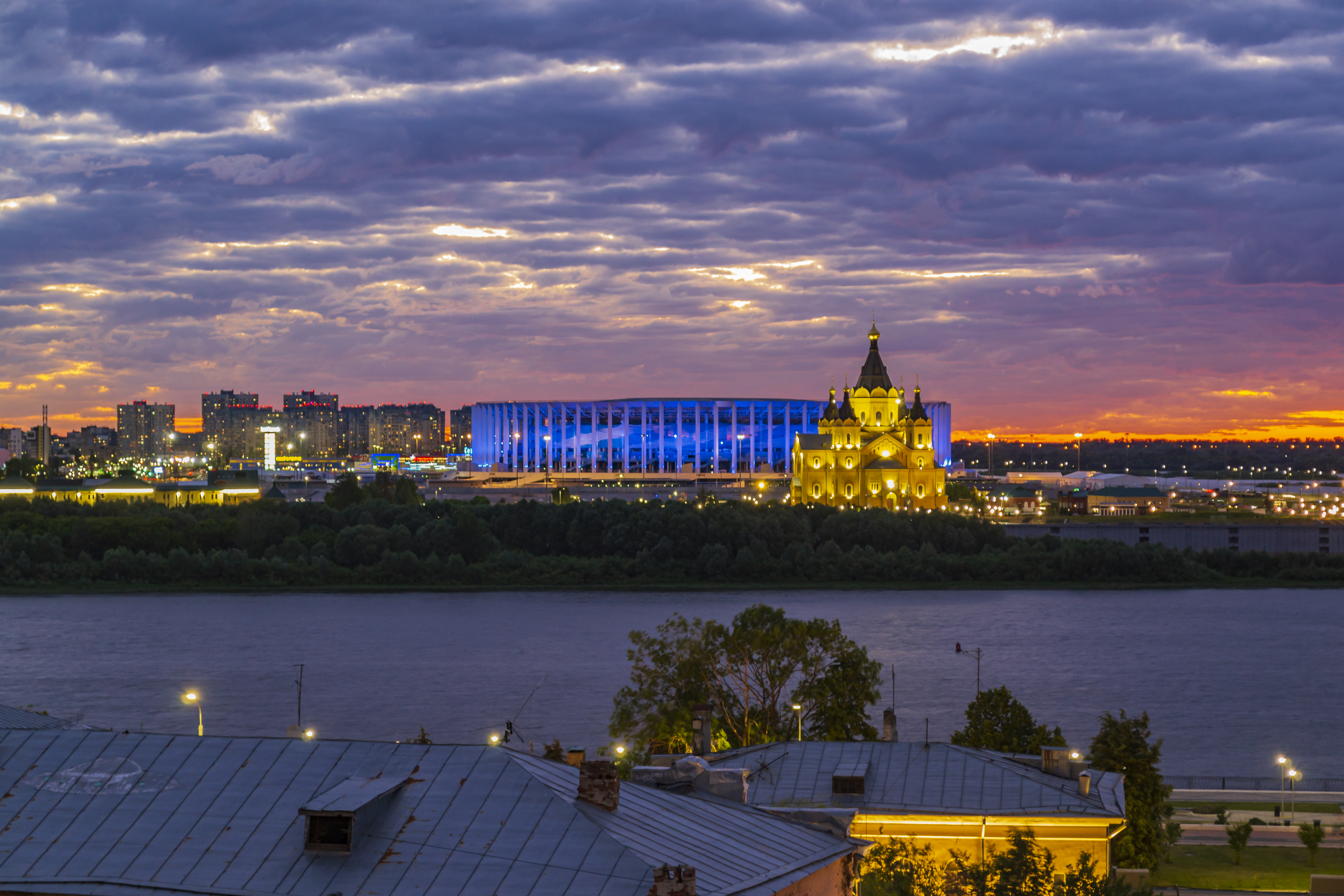
- Nizhny Novgorod, the largest city in the region

- Map of Volga-Vyatka Economic Region
- Country: Russia

Area
  - Total: 264,844 km^{2} (102,257 sq mi)

Population (2021)
  - Total: 6,915,349
  - Density: 26.1110/km^{2} (67.6273/sq mi)

GDP
  - Total: ₽ 3,282 billion US$ 44.635 billion (2021)

The Volga-Vyatka Economic Region (Note: Russian: Волго-Вятский экономический район, romanized: Volgo-Vyatskiy ekonomicheskiy rayon; Chuvash: Атăл-Нухрат экономика районĕ, romanized: Atăl-Nuhrat ekonomika rayonĕ; Erzya: Равонь-Вяткань экономикань буесь, romanized: Ravoń Vätkań ekonomikań bujeś) is one of twelve economic regions of Russia. It accounted for almost 3% of the national GRP in 2008. All of it is in the Volga Federal District.

== Composition ==
- Chuvash Republic
- Kirov Oblast
- Mari El Republic
- Republic of Mordovia
- Nizhny Novgorod Oblast
