= Ural Economic Region =

Coordinates: 56.8333°N 60.5833°E

Ural Economic Region Ура́льский экономи́ческий райо́н
- Economic region
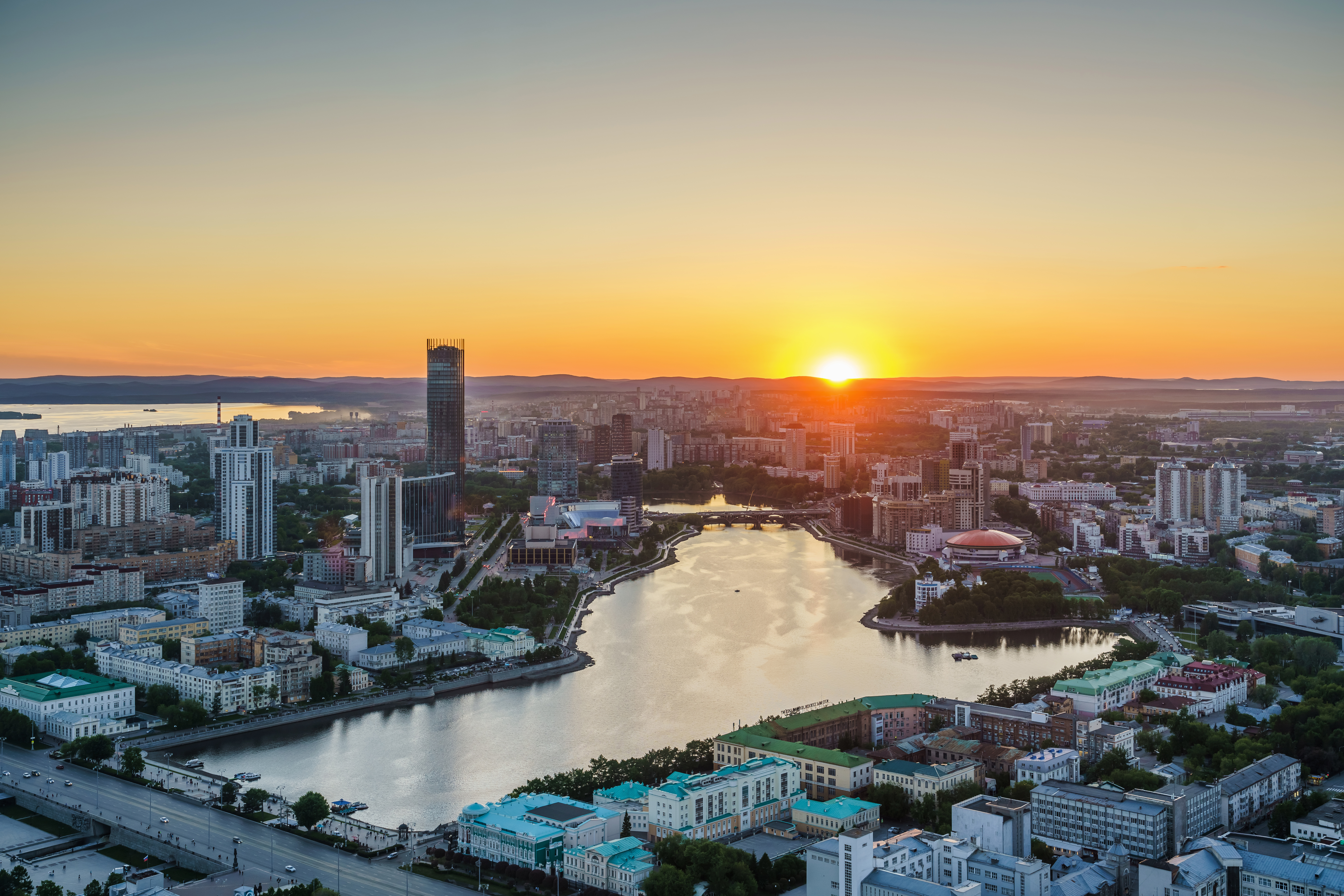
- Yekaterinburg, the largest city in the region

- Map of Ural Economic Region
- Country: Russia

Area
  - Total: 823,270 km^{2} (317,870 sq mi)

Population (2021)
  - Total: 18,416,392
  - Density: 22.370/km^{2} (57.938/sq mi)

GDP
  - Total: ₽ 11,326 billion US$ 154.034 billion (2021)

The Ural Economic Region (Note: Russian: Ура́льский экономи́ческий райо́н, romanized: Ural'skiy ekonomicheskiy rayon) is one of twelve economic regions of Russia. This prominent industrial region consists of the following subdivisions (with their administrative centers): Bashkortostan (Ufa), Chelyabinsk Oblast (Chelyabinsk), Kurgan Oblast (Kurgan), Orenburg Oblast (Orenburg), Perm Krai (Perm), Sverdlovsk Oblast (Yekaterinburg) and Udmurt Republic (Izhevsk). It is mostly located in the Central, and partly in the Southern and Northern parts of the Urals, but also includes parts of the East European and West Siberian Plains. Its extent is different from that of the Ural Federal District; Bashkortostan, Orenburg Oblast, Perm Krai and Udmurtia are in the Volga Federal District while the other three are in the Ural Federal District.

== Geography and natural resources ==
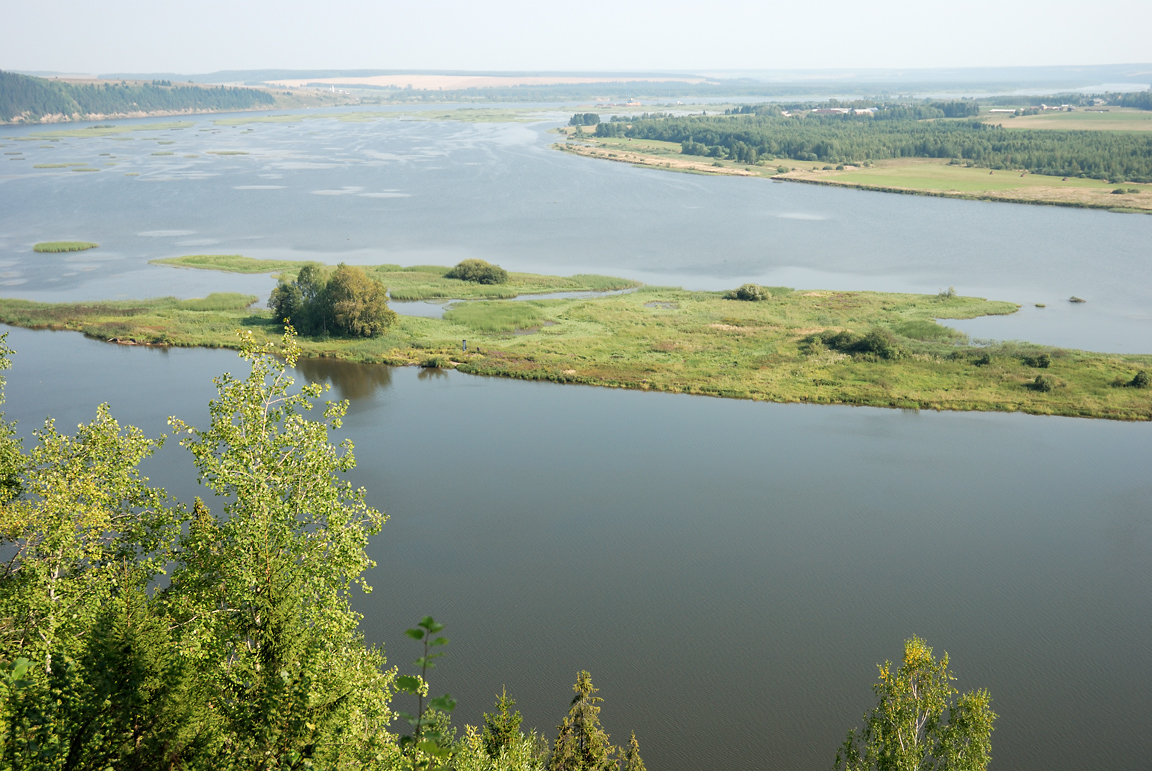
Lower part of the Chusovaya River

The region is crossed by rivers belonging to the Volga basin (Kama, Vishera, Chusovaya and Samara), Ob basin (Tobol, Iset, Tura and Tavda) and the Ural River basin. Their potential hydropower resources are estimated at 3.3 million kilowatts. By 2010, there are only two dams and associated reservoirs, both on the Kama River: Votkinsk Reservoir and Kama Reservoir. The climate is temperate continental in the western and continental in the eastern part of the region. More than 40% of the area is covered by taiga forests having the timber reserves of 3.5 billion cubic meters. The southern part is dominated by the steppe, which is largely cultivated. The area is exceptionally rich in various ores and minerals, such as valuable chalcopyrite, nickel oxide, chromite, magnetite, bauxite, potassium salts, manganese, aluminium, gold, platinum, as well as coal, oil and natural gas. The area is famous for semi-precious stones, such as emerald, amethyst, aquamarine, jasper, rhodonite, malachite and diamond.

== Industry ==
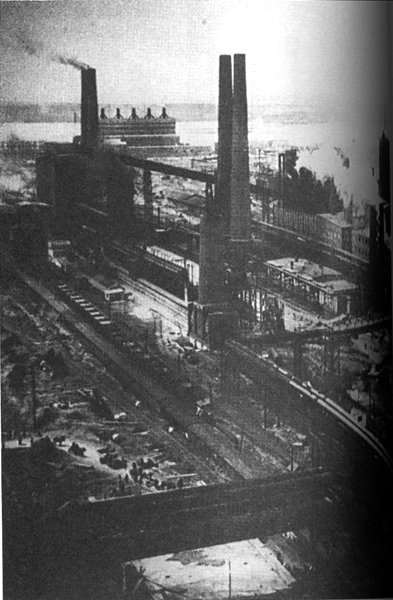
Magnitogorsk Iron and Steel Works in the 1920s-30s

Ural economic region accounted for 10 per cent of the national GRP in 2008. It has a diverse and complex structure of machinery and metal industries. Nationwide importance have ferrous and nonferrous metallurgy, mechanical engineering, chemistry, mining of minerals and natural gas, logging and wood processing. The Ural industry is characterized by the high concentration of production around certain areas, such as transport hubs, close cooperation between different branches and recycling of industrial waste. The timber production is concentrated in the north and agriculture mostly in the south. The areas of the Central Ural regions on the both sides of the Ural Mountains (Sverdlovsk, Nizhny Tagil, Chelyabinsk, Magnitogorsk, Orsk) are dominated by mining and processing of metals and suburban agriculture. The basin of Kama River (Berezniki, Solikamsk, Perm, Krasnokamsk, Chaikovsky) has developed chemical, timber and wood processing industries, machine building and some areas of agriculture (mostly potato, vegetable and dairy products).

Metallurgical industry is one of the oldest in the region and is based on the rich local deposits. Major metalworking enterprises are Magnitogorsk Iron and Steel Works, Nizhniy Tagil Iron and Steel Works and Chelyabinsk Tube Rolling Plant. They process ores not only from the Urals, but also from Kazakhstan and the Kursk Magnetic Anomaly, whereas the coking coal for their operation is brought from Kuzbass and Karaganda coal basins. There are also many reconstructed historical plants. More than half of the iron ore for metallurgy comes from deposits of Magnitogorsk, Pervouralsk, Bakalsk and Vysokogorsky Districts. It is used not only for traditional metalworking, but there is also a large-scale production of ferroalloys. A major mining plant was opened near Kachkanar in 1963 to process the abundant titanomagnetite ores of the region.

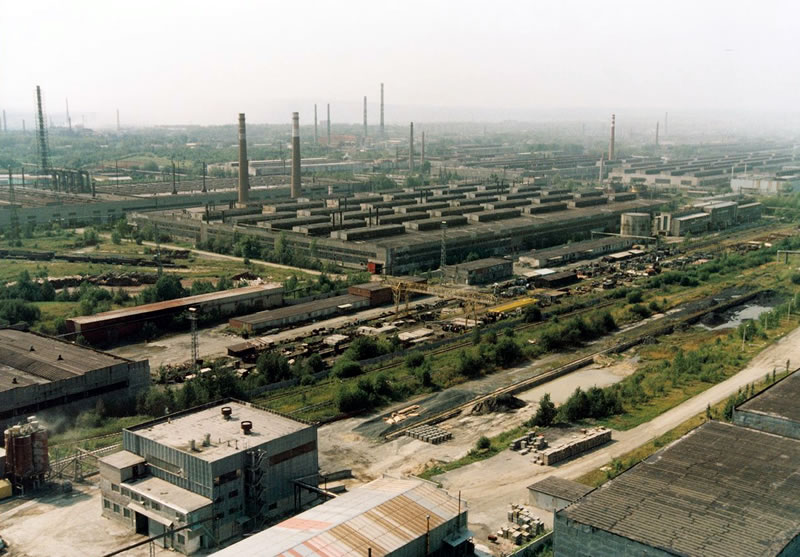
Chelyabinsk Tube Rolling Plant

Ural economic region contains major metallurgical and chemical enterprises of Russia, such as Uralmash, Uralkhimmash, Uralhydromash, etc. There are also major machinery plants producing freight wagons (Nizhny Tagil), cars and motorcycles (Izhevsk, Ural Automotive Plant in Miass), tractors (Chelyabinsk and Orsk), machine-tools (in Chelyabinsk, Orenburg, Alapaevsk, etc.). The chemical industry of the region is focused on the production of basic chemicals such as potassium and magnesium salts (Berezniki, Solikamsk), fertilizers (Berezniki, Solikamsk, Perm, Krasnouralsk, etc.), sulfuric acid and sulfur, chlorine and its derivatives. Developed is also production of Coke (fuel), rubber, paint, synthetic fibers and yarns, plastics and resins (Sverdlovsk, Nizhny Tagil, etc.), alcohols (Orsk), as well as petrochemical industry (Perm, Sverdlovsk, Orenburg). Ural is one of the most important Russian mining and processing regions of talc (Miass deposit), magnesite (Satka field) and construction materials. In 1975, it produced 14.6 million tonnes of cement and 6.8 million cubic meters of precast reinforced concrete structures and components. About half of the harvested timber is processed locally, in Perm, Krasnokamsk, Tavda, Krasnovishersk and other cities, mostly for paper (1 million tonnes in 1973), sawn timber and plywood (213,000 m^{2} in 1973). Unprocessed timber is floated down the Kama to the Volga area.

There is significant mining of coal (in Kizelovsky, Serovsky and Chelyabinsk areas), oil (Kama and Orenburg areas), gas and peat, but it is not sufficient for the industry and therefore Urals imports coal from the Kuzbass and Karaganda, gas (from Western Siberia and Central Asia) and oil. Refining centers are in Perm, Krasnokamsk and Orsk. Orenburg is the center of gas production and has one of Europe's largest gas condensate deposits. Electricity is provided by a network of thermal and hydroelectric power stations and by the Beloyarsk Nuclear Power Station. The electrical network is connected to the power grids of the Tyumen and Aktobe regions and the central European parts of Russia.

== Food and agriculture ==
The food industry of the Ural economic region specializes in producing wheat, meat and dairy, mostly around the major industrial centers. Most fields are located in southern areas. The land division is as follows (all data below are likely from 1970s): arable land 17.8 million hectares, hayfields 2.9 million ha, pastures 7 million hectares. The irrigated area is 128 hectares and 70 thousand hectares are drained. The total sown area is 16.4 million ha, of which 10.9 million ha is used for grains, 4.9 million ha for fodder crops, 0.1 million ha for technical sunflower and flax and 0.5 million ha for potatoes and vegetables. Grains are dominated by the spring wheat (5.7 million hectares). Greenhouse farming is well-developed in this region. Livestock (1980s) was 3,900,000 cattle and 2,300,000 cows, 2,000,000 pigs, 4,600,000 sheep and goats, 34,600,000 items of poultry. Food and closes industries produce flour, meat and dairy, leather and footwear, garment and textile. There is a factory of linen (Sverdlovsk) and plants producing synthetic silk (Orenburg, Chaikovsky).

== Transport ==
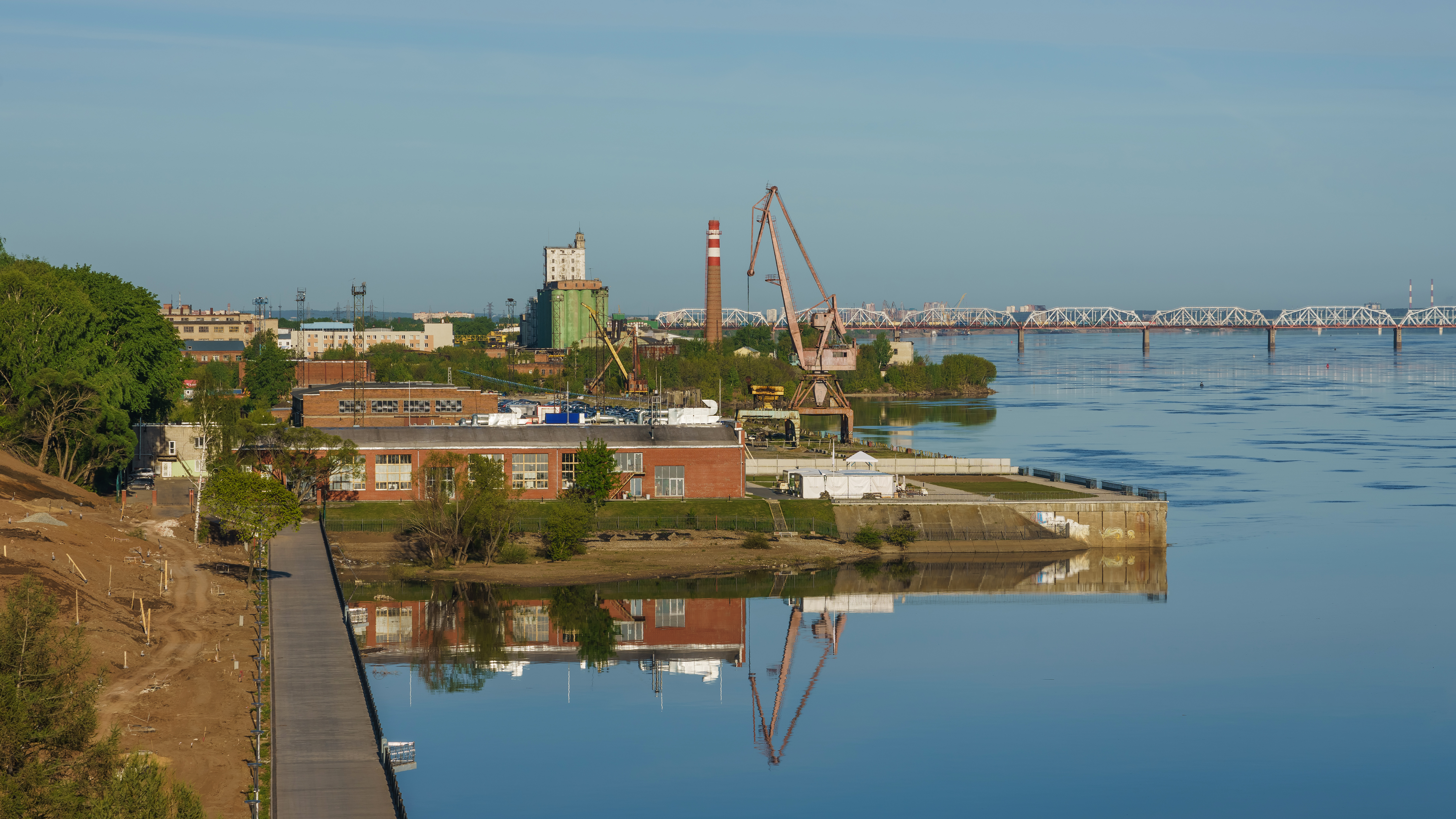
River port and railway bridge over the Kama River in Perm

Trains account for most transport in the region with the operational length of railways about 10,000 km. Most important railways are latitudinal, crossing the Central and Southern Ural in six places: Nizhny Tagil – Perm, Sverdlovsk – Perm, Sverdlovsk – Kazan, Chelyabinsk – Ufa, Orsk – Orenburg and Magnitogorsk – West Siberia. Because of the high traffic density, most railways are electrified. The region is crossed by several major pipelines supplying and transporting natural gas from the Tyumen Oblast and Central Asia and oil from Western Siberia. There is industrial navigation on the Kama River. Major cities have local and domestic airports, with the major airline carrier being Ural Airlines.

== Socio-economic indicators ==
Being one of the most populated areas of Russia, Ural economic region has a large gross domestic product (GDP), mostly due to the urban economic activity. The GDP per capita is above the national average, but the average monthly wages are lower than those in the major central-Russian cities such as Moscow and Saint Petersburg. The fraction of wages paid in full is below the national average. Most industry is based on large enterprises; their structure has not been affected much by the privatization and reforms after the collapse of the Soviet Union. The proportion of employees in ex-Soviet enterprises in the Urals is above the national average, while the proportion in new private enterprises is well below average.

== See also ==
- South Ural State University
- Urals Academy of Architecture
- Ural Philharmonic Orchestra
- Ural-Siberian method
- Ural State University
- Ural State Technical University
