= East Siberian Economic Region =

Economic region of Russia

East Siberian Economic Region Восточно-Сибирский экономический район (Russian)
- Economic region
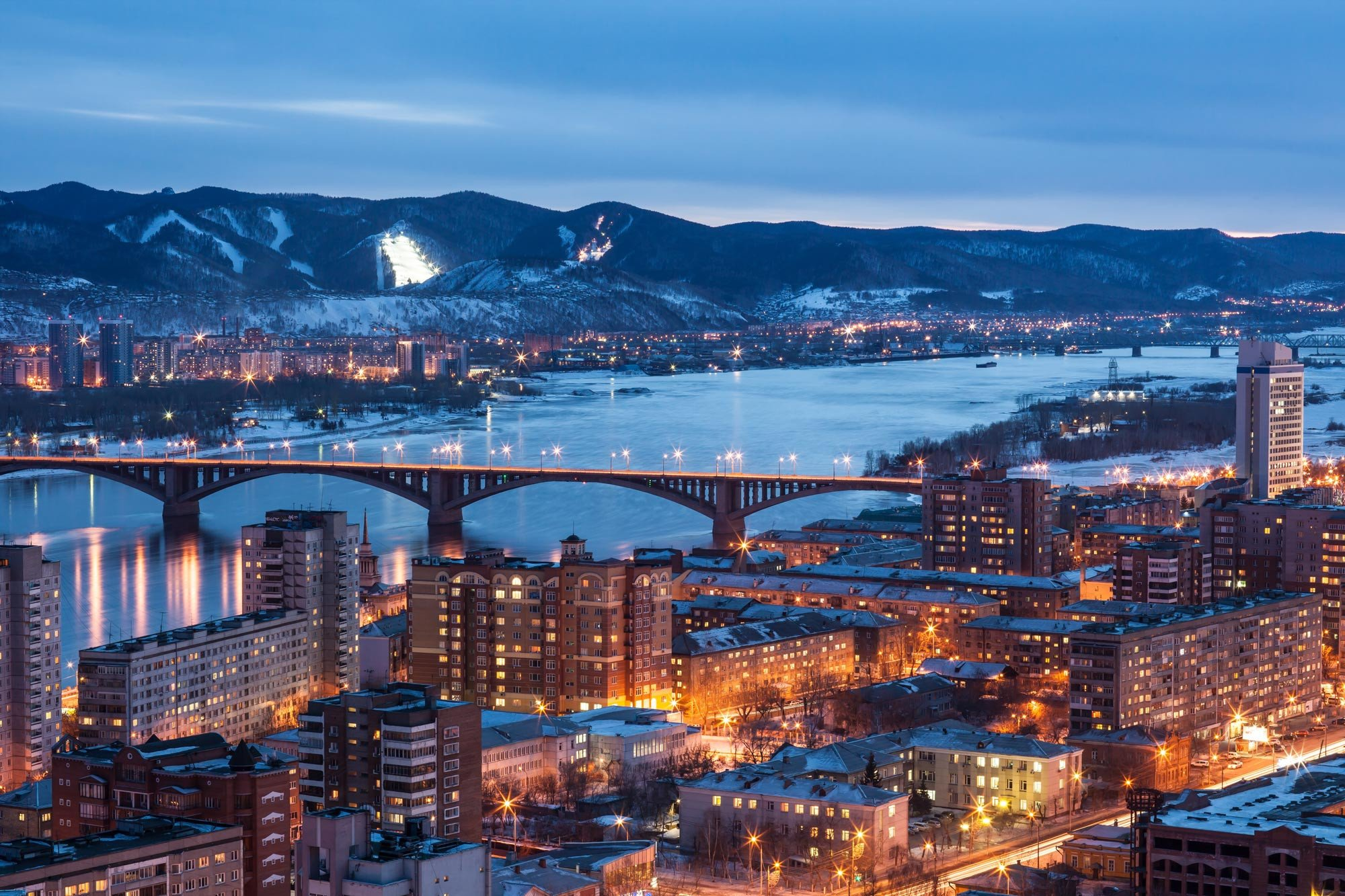
- Krasnoyarsk, the largest city in the region

- Map of East Siberian Economic Region
- Country: Russia

Area
  - Total: 3,371,816 km^{2} (1,301,865 sq mi)

Population (2021)
  - Total: 6,096,127
  - Density: 1.807965/km^{2} (4.682609/sq mi)

GDP
  - Total: ₽ 5,386 billion US$ 73.250 billion (2021)

The East Siberian Economic Region (Note: Russian: Восточно-Сибирский экономический район, romanized: Vostochno-Sibirskiy ekonomicheskiy rayon, IPA: [vɐˈstotɕnə sʲɪˈbʲirskʲɪj ɪkənɐˈmʲitɕɪskʲɪj rɐˈjon]) is one of twelve economic regions of Russia.

In this area of plateaus, mountains, and river basins, the major cities—Krasnoyarsk and Irkutsk—are located along the Trans-Siberian Railroad. There are hydroelectric stations at Bratsk, Krasnoyarsk, and Irkutsk. Coal, gold, graphite, iron ore, aluminum ore, zinc, and lead are mined in the area, and livestock is raised.

== Composition ==
Federal subject	Federal district
Irkutsk Oblast	Siberian Federal District
Republic of Khakassia	Siberian Federal District
Krasnoyarsk Krai	Siberian Federal District
Tuva Republic	Siberian Federal District

== Socio-economic indicators ==
The East Siberian economic region accounted for 4 per cent of the national GRP in 2008. This sparsely populated region between Europe and Asia has high wage levels and also a relatively large portion of employees in the new private sector. Productivity is also high by Russian standards.

It ranks especially low in the migration of people into the region and population change, and in the expectation of life to improve and evaluation of the national economy.
