= Northern Economic Region =

Economic region in Russia

Northern Economic Region Се́верный экономи́ческий райо́н
- Economic region
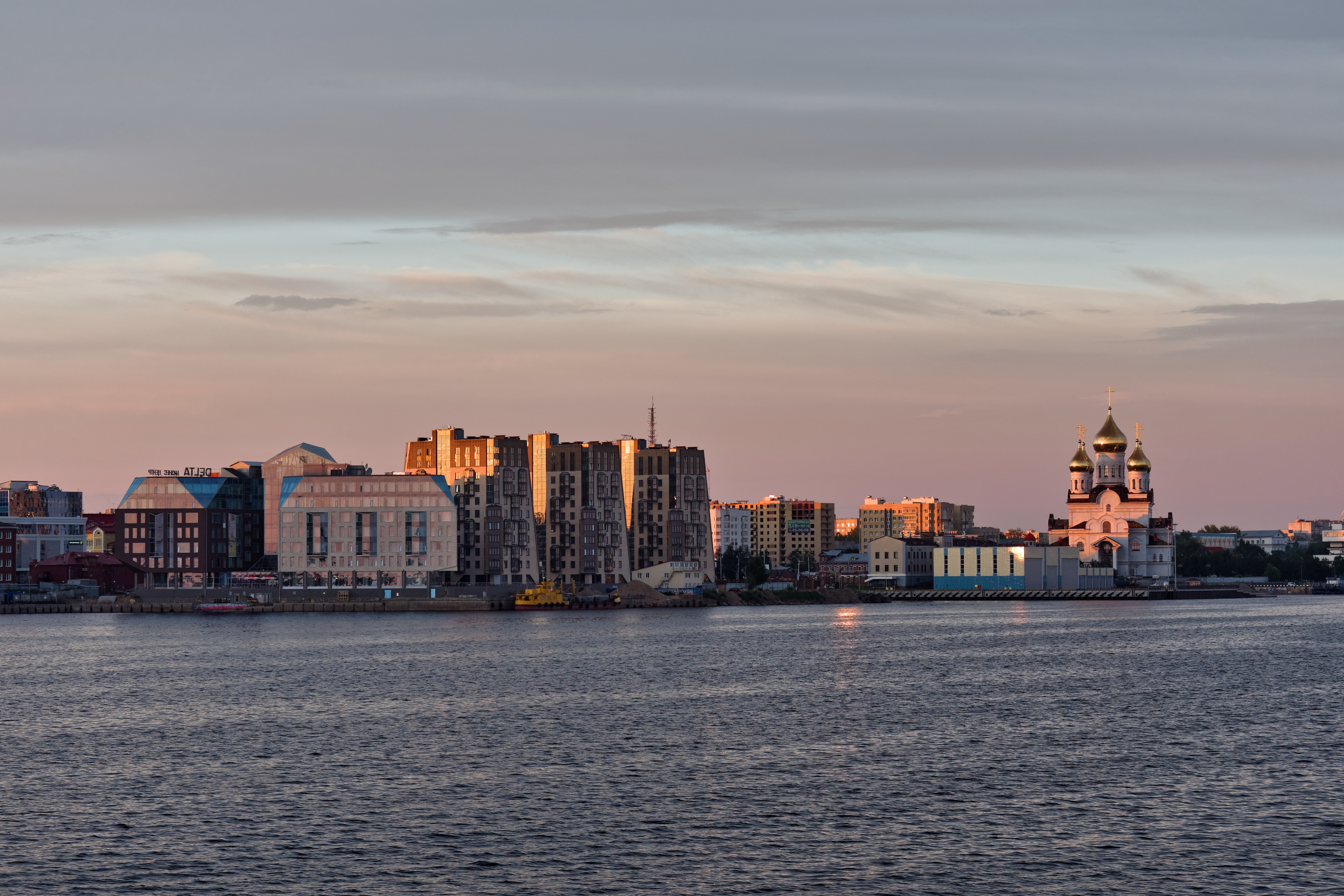
- Arkhangelsk, the largest city in the region

- Northern Economic Region on a map of Russia
- Country: Russia

Area
  - Total: 1,476,636 km^{2} (570,132 sq mi)

Population
  - Total: 4,101,852
  - Density: 2.777836/km^{2} (7.194561/sq mi)

GDP
  - Total: ₽ 5,129 billion US$ 69.754 billion (2021)

The Northern Economic Region (Russian: Се́верный экономи́ческий райо́н, romanized: Severnyy ekonomicheskiy rayon), is one of twelve economic regions of Russia.

== Composition ==
- Arkhangelsk Oblast
  - Nenets Autonomous Okrug
- Republic of Karelia
- Komi Republic
- Murmansk Oblast
- Vologda Oblast

All are in the Northwestern Federal District

== Socio-economic indicators ==
The Northern Economic Region accounted for almost 4% of the national GRP in 2008. In the partly arctic zone of Russia, monthly wages appear much higher than the national average, but this is offset by the likelihood of payment being much lower. A higher proportion in the region are employed in a state enterprise, and a lower proportion are secure in their jobs. Unemployment is more than one fifth higher in the region than across Russia as a whole.

Although climatic conditions can be daunting, the life expectancy in the Northern region is almost exactly the national average for both men and women. Youths ambitious for a higher education tend to leave the region; the ratio of students to population is a fifth lower than the national average. And, for those who live in the region, the expectation of life improving is lower than the national average.
