= Far Eastern Economic Region =

Economic region in Russia

Far Eastern economic region Дальневосточный экономический район (Russian)
- Economic region
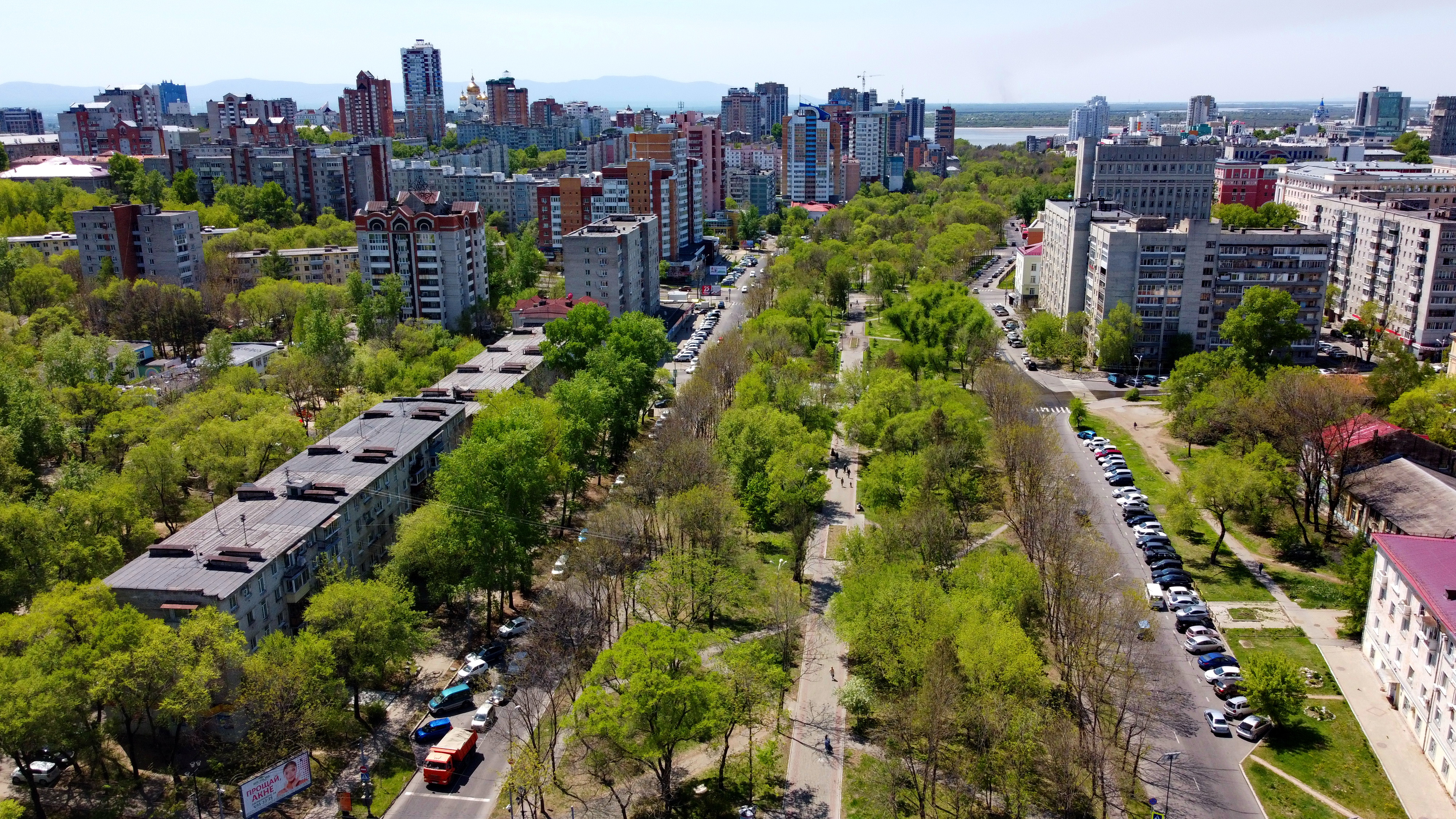
- Khabarovsk, the largest city in the region

- Map of Far Eastern Region
- Country: Russia

Area
  - Total: 6,952,600 km^{2} (2,684,400 sq mi)

Population (2021)
  - Total: 7,975,762
  - Density: 1.1472/km^{2} (2.9711/sq mi)

GDP
  - Total: ₽ 7,374 billion US$ 100.286 billion (2021)

Time zones
- Buryatia: UTC+08:00 (Irkutsk Time)
- Amur Oblast, Zabaykalsky Krai and most of the Sakha Republic (excluding districts in UTC+10:00 and UTC+11:00 time zones): UTC+09:00 (Yakutsk Time)
- Jewish Autonomous Oblast, Khabarovsk Krai, Primorsky Krai, and the Oymyakonsky, Ust-Yansky and Verkhoyansky districts of the Sakha Republic: UTC+10:00 (Vladivostok Time)
- Magadan Oblast, Sakhalin Oblast, and the Abyysky, Allaikhovsky, Momsky, Nizhnekolymsky, Srednekolymsky and Verkhnekolymsky districts of the Sakha Republic: UTC+11:00 (Magadan Time)
- Chukotka and Kamchatka Krai: UTC+12:00 (Kamchatka Time)

The Far Eastern Economic Region (Note: Russian: Дальневосточный экономический район, IPA: [dəlʲnʲɪvɐˈstotɕnɨj ɪkənɐˈmʲitɕɪskʲɪj rɐˈjɵn]) is one of twelve economic regions of Russia.

== Composition ==
Until 2018 it encompassed the same area as the Far Eastern Federal District. In 2019 it was enlarged with the addition of the Buryatia Republic and Zabaykalsky Krai.

The federal subjects are:

- Amur Oblast
- Buryat Republic
- Chukotka Autonomous Okrug
- Jewish Autonomous Oblast
- Kamchatka Krai
- Khabarovsk Krai
- Magadan Oblast
- Primorsky Krai
- Sakha Republic
- Sakhalin Oblast
- Zabaykalsky Krai

== Economy ==
This region accounted for 4% of the national GRP in 2008. Bordering the Pacific Ocean, the region has Komsomolsk-on-Amur, Khabarovsk, Yakutsk, and Vladivostok as its chief cities. Machinery is produced, and lumbering, fishing, hunting, and fur trapping are important. The Trans-Siberian Railroad follows the Amur and Ussuri rivers and terminates at the port of Vladivostok.
