= Volga Economic Region =

Economic region in Russia

Volga Economic Region Поволжский экономический район
- Economic region
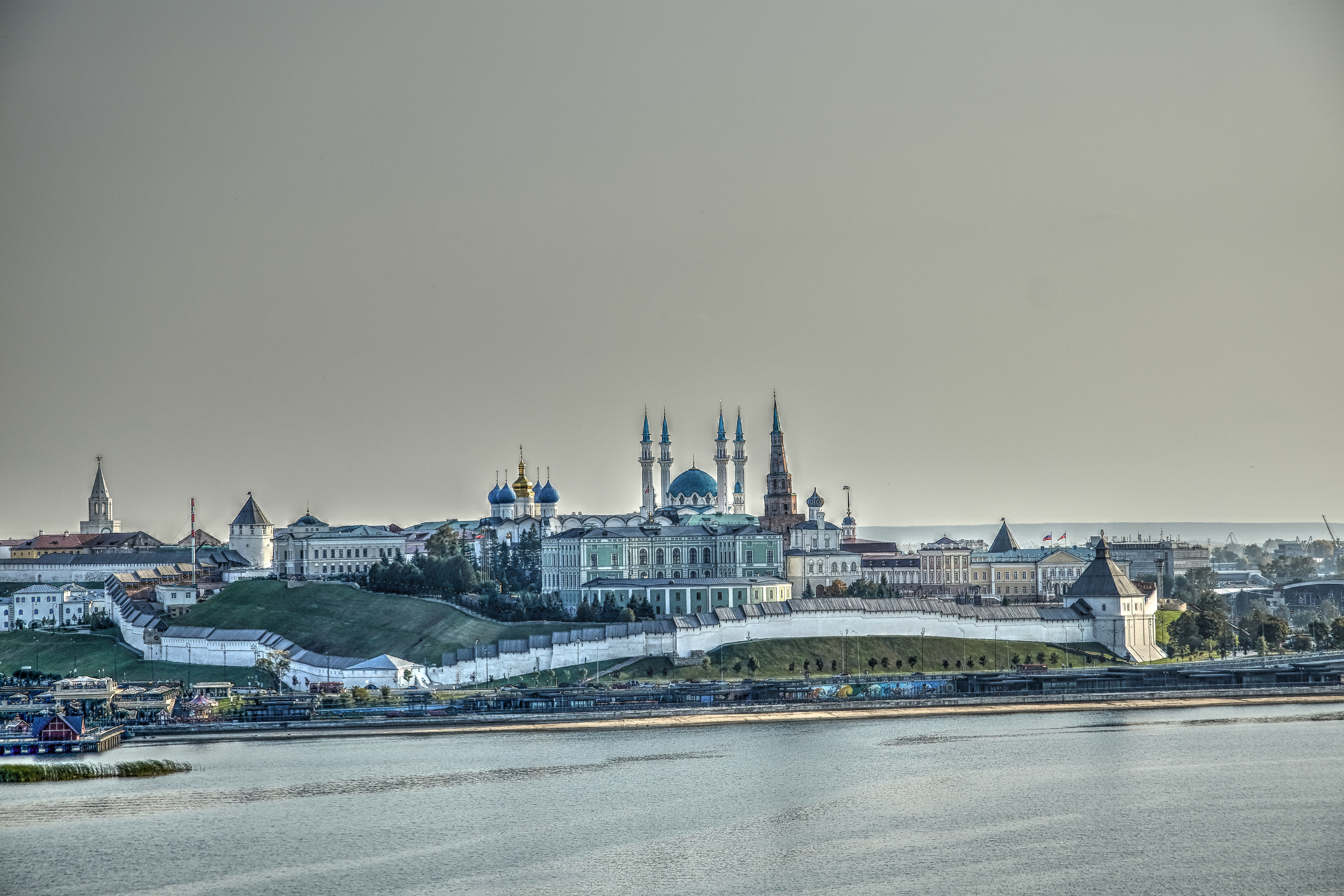
- Kazan, the largest city in the region

- Map of Volga Economic Region
- Country: Russia

Area
  - Total: 539,817 km^{2} (208,425 sq mi)

Population (2021)
  - Total: 15,811,548
  - Density: 29.2906/km^{2} (75.8622/sq mi)

GDP
  - Total: ₽ 9,428 billion US$ 128.221 billion (2021)

The Volga Economic Region (Note: Russian: Поволжский экономический район, romanized: Povolzhskiy ekonomicheskiy rayon, IPA: [pɐˈvoɫʂskʲɪj ɪkənɐˈmʲitɕɪskʲɪj rɐˈjɵn]) is one of 12 economic regions of Russia.

== Composition ==
- Astrakhan Oblast (part of Southern Federal District)
- Republic of Kalmykia (part of Southern Federal District)
- Penza Oblast (part of Volga Federal District)
- Samara Oblast (part of Volga Federal District)
- Saratov Oblast (part of Volga Federal District)
- Republic of Tatarstan (part of Volga Federal District)
- Ulyanovsk Oblast (part of Volga Federal District)
- Volgograd Oblast (part of Southern Federal District)

== Economy ==
The Volga economic region accounted for almost 8 percent of Russia's national GRP in 2008.
