= North Caucasus Economic Region =

Economic region in Russia

North Caucasus Economic Region Северо-Кавказский экономический район
- Economic region
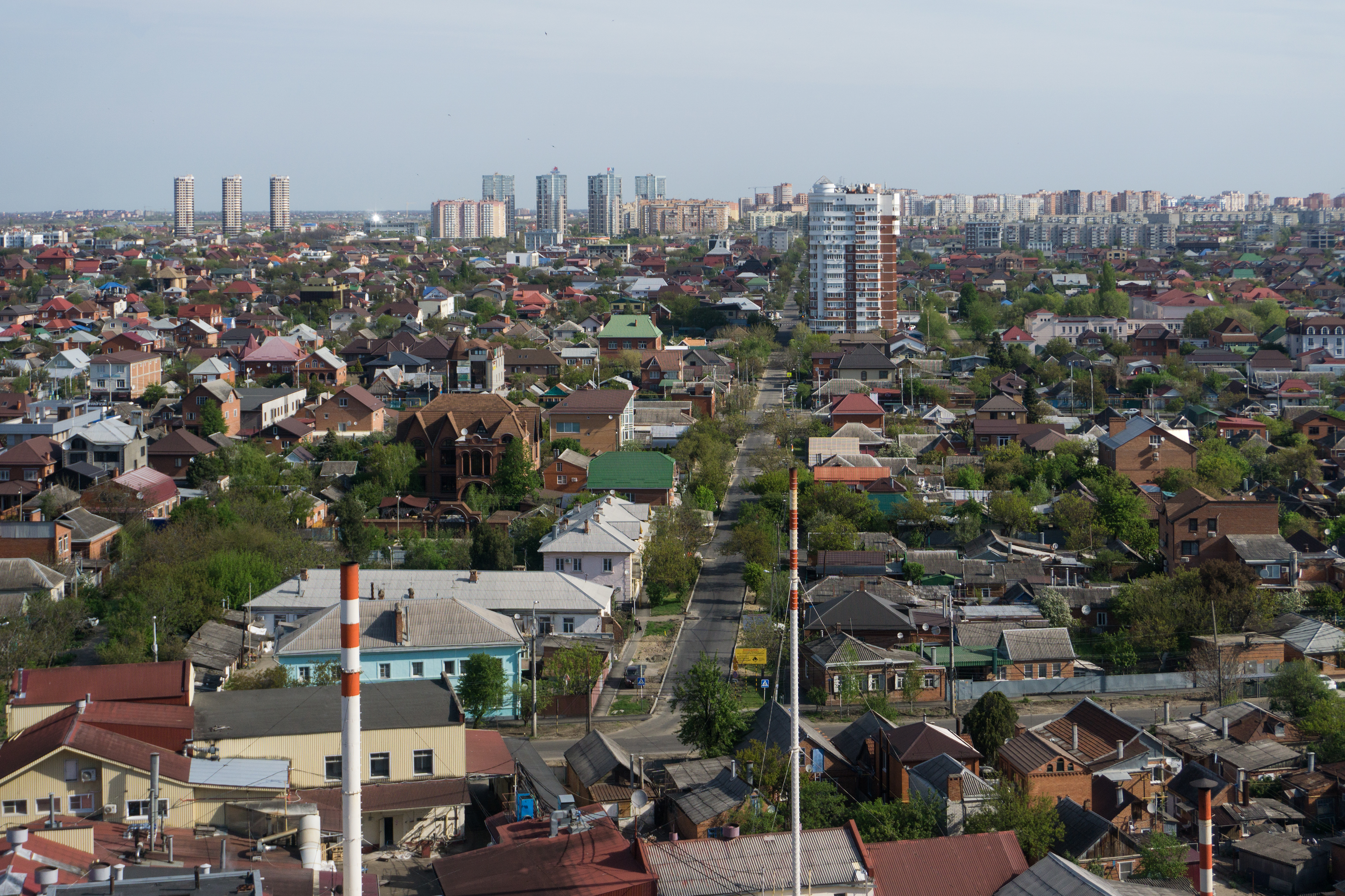
- Krasnodar, the largest city in the region

- North Caucasus Economic Region on the map of Russia (including Crimea)
- Country: Russia

Area
  - Total: 381,600 km^{2} (147,300 sq mi)

Population (2021)
  - Total: 22,642,000
  - Density: 59.33/km^{2} (153.7/sq mi)

GDP
  - Total: ₽ 10,670 billion US$ 145.100 billion (2021)

North Caucasus Economic Region (Се́веро-Кавка́зский экономи́ческий райо́н; tr.: Severo-Kavkazskiy ekonomicheskiy rayon) is one of 12 economic regions of Russia. It comprises the whole of the North Caucasian Federal District and the western federal subjects of the Southern Federal District.

In this area, descending northward from the principal chain of the Caucasus Mountains to a level plain, are found rich deposits of oil, natural gas, and coal. Major cities include Krasnodar, Rostov-on-Don, Makhachkala, Stavropol, Grozny, Vladikavkaz and Novorossiysk. Sochi is a popular resort city. Farm machinery, coal, petroleum, and natural gas are the chief products. The Kuban River region, a fertile black-earth area, is one of the chief granaries of Russia. Wheat, sugar beets, tobacco, rice, and sunflower seeds are grown, and cattle are raised. Other rivers include the Don, the Kuma, and the Terek, and the Volga–Don Canal is a major transportation route.

== Composition ==
- Republic of Adygea (part of Southern Federal District)
- Chechen Republic (part of North Caucasian Federal District)
- Republic of Dagestan (part of North Caucasian Federal District)
- Republic of Ingushetia (part of North Caucasian Federal District)
- Kabardino-Balkar Republic (part of North Caucasian Federal District)
- Karachay–Cherkess Republic (part of North Caucasian Federal District)
- Krasnodar Krai (part of Southern Federal District)
- Republic of North Ossetia–Alania (part of North Caucasian Federal District)
- Rostov Oblast (part of Southern Federal District)
- Stavropol Krai (part of North Caucasian Federal District)

== Socio-economic indicators ==
North Caucasus economic region accounted for almost 6 per cent of the national GRP in 2008. This region includes the most troubled part of the Russian Federation, the Chechen Republic, and other republics where ethnic tensions are high. Economic capacities are far lower than the average for the country as a whole. GDP per capita is barely half that of the average for the Federation, and productivity and wages are also low. Employment in agriculture is also well above the national average.

Life expectancy for both men and women is at the average for the Federation as a whole. But other high indicators are signs of troubles, for example, the migration of the population, the readiness of people to move to find a job elsewhere and high unemployment.

== See also ==
- North Caucasus
