= Kaliningrad Economic Region =

Economic region in Russia

Kaliningrad Economic Region Калининградский экономический район
- Economic region
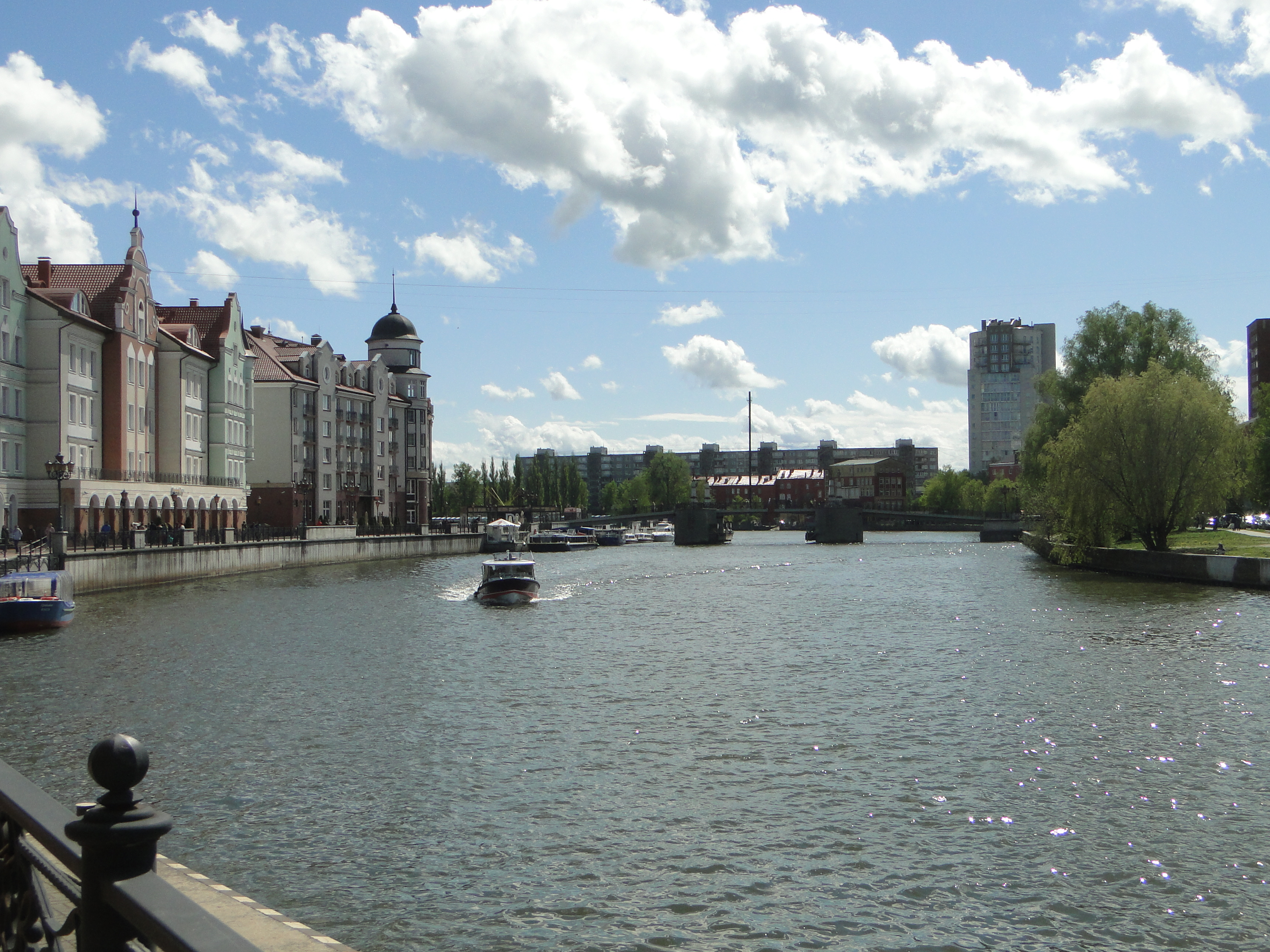
- Kaliningrad, the largest city in the region

- Map of Kaliningrad Economic Region
- Country: Russia

Area
  - Total: 15,125 km^{2} (5,840 sq mi)

Population (2021)
  - Total: 1,029,966
  - Density: 68.097/km^{2} (176.37/sq mi)

GDP
  - Total: ₽ 738 billion US$ 10.6 billion (2022)

The Kaliningrad Economic Region (Note: Russian: Калининградский экономический район, romanized: Kaliningradskiy ekonomicheskiy rayon) is an economic region of Russia consisting of Kaliningrad Oblast.
