= Economic regions of Russia =

Central Black Earth Economic Region Central Economic Region East Siberia Economic Region Far East Economic Region Kaliningrad Economic Region North Caucasus Economic Region North Economic Region Northwest Economic Region Ural Economic Region Volga Economic Region Volga-Vyatka Economic Region West Siberia Economic Region

Russia is divided into twelve economic regions (Note: Russian: экономические районы, romanized: ekonomicheskiye rayony, IPA: [ɪkənɐˈmʲitɕɪskʲɪje rɐˈjɵnɨ]) — groups of federal subjects sharing the following characteristics:

- Common economic and social goals and participation in development programs;
- Relatively similar economic conditions and potential;
- Similar climatic, ecological, and geological conditions;
- Similar methods of technical inspection of new construction;
- Similar methods of conducting customs oversight;
- Overall similar living conditions of the population.

No federal subject can belong to more than one economic region.

Economic regions are also grouped into economic zones (also called "macrozones"). An economic region or its parts can belong to more than one economic zone.

Establishment and abolition of economic regions and economic zones or any changes in their composition are decided upon by the federal government of Russia.

This division into economic regions is different from the division into federal districts. The former are solely for economic and statistical purposes, and the latter exist solely to uphold the federal laws on the territory of the country.

== Table ==
Economic region	Population (2021)	Area (km2)	GDP (million US$)
Central	33,276,581	482,300	611,550
Central Black Earth	7,057,951	167,900	62,098
East Siberian	6,096,127	3,371,800	73,250
Far Eastern	7,975,762	6,952,600	100,286
Kaliningrad	1,029,966	15,100	10,600
North Caucasus	22,642,000	381,600	145,110
Northern	4,101,852	1,476,600	69,754
Northwestern	8,785,379	195,200	192,610
Ural	18,416,392	823,300	154,034
Volga	15,811,458	539,800	128,221
Volga-Vyatka	6,968,440	264,800	44,635
West Siberian	16,281,060	2,454,000	234,600

== List and composition of the economic regions ==
The following is the list and composition of the economic regions, sorted by population.

- Central Black Earth (Note: Центрально-Чернозёмный, Tsentral'no-Chernozyomnyy, IPA: [tsɨnˌtralʲnə tɕɪrnɐˈzʲɵmnɨj])
1. Belgorod Oblast
2. Kursk Oblast
3. Lipetsk Oblast
4. Tambov Oblast
5. Voronezh Oblast
- Central (Note: Центральный, Tsentral'nyy, IPA: [tsɨnˈtralʲnɨj])
1. Bryansk Oblast
2. Ivanovo Oblast
3. Kaluga Oblast
4. Kostroma Oblast
5. Moscow (federal city)
6. Moscow Oblast
7. Oryol Oblast
8. Ryazan Oblast
9. Smolensk Oblast
10. Tula Oblast
11. Tver Oblast
12. Vladimir Oblast
13. Yaroslavl Oblast
- East Siberian (Note: Восточно-Сибирский, Vostochno-Sibirskiy, IPA: [vɐˌstotɕnə sʲɪˈbʲirskʲɪj])
1. Irkutsk Oblast
2. Khakassia
3. Krasnoyarsk Krai
4. Tuva Republic
- Far Eastern (Note: Дальневосточный, Dal'nevostochnyy, IPA: [ˌdalʲnʲɪvɐˈstotɕnɨj])
1. Amur Oblast
2. Buryat Republic
3. Chukotka Autonomous Okrug
4. Jewish Autonomous Oblast
5. Kamchatka Krai
6. Khabarovsk Krai
7. Magadan Oblast
8. Primorsky Krai
9. Sakha
10. Sakhalin Oblast
11. Zabaykalsky Krai
- Kaliningrad (Note: Калининградский, Kaliningradskiy, IPA: [kəlʲɪnʲɪnˈɡratskʲɪj])
1. Kaliningrad Oblast
- North Caucasus (Note: Северо-Кавказский, Severo-Kavkazskiy, IPA: [ˌsʲevʲɪrə kɐfˈkasːkʲɪj])
1. Adygea
2. Chechen Republic
3. Crimea
4. Dagestan
5. Ingushetia
6. Kabardino-Balkar Republic
7. Karachay–Cherkess Republic
8. Krasnodar Krai
9. North Ossetia–Alania
10. Rostov Oblast
11. Sevastopol (federal city)
12. Stavropol Krai
- Northern (Note: Северный, Severnyy, IPA: [ˈsʲevʲɪrnɨj])
1. Arkhangelsk Oblast
2. Karelia
3. Komi Republic
4. Murmansk Oblast
5. Nenets Autonomous Okrug
6. Vologda Oblast
- Northwestern (Note: Северо-Западный, Severo-Zapadnyy, IPA: [ˌsʲevʲɪrɐ ˈzapədnɨj])
1. Leningrad Oblast
2. Novgorod Oblast
3. Pskov Oblast
4. Saint Petersburg (federal city)
- Ural (Note: Уральский, Ural'skiy, IPA: [ʊˈralʲskʲɪj])
1. Bashkortostan
2. Chelyabinsk Oblast
3. Kurgan Oblast
4. Orenburg Oblast
5. Perm Krai
6. Sverdlovsk Oblast
7. Udmurt Republic
- Volga (Note: Поволжский, Povolzhskiy, IPA: [pɐˈvoɫʂskʲɪj] The traditional name of the region, meaning 'along the Volga River'.)
1. Astrakhan Oblast
2. Kalmykia
3. Penza Oblast
4. Samara Oblast
5. Saratov Oblast
6. Tatarstan
7. Ulyanovsk Oblast
8. Volgograd Oblast
- Volga-Vyatka (Note: Волго-Вятский, Volgo-Vyatskiy, IPA: [ˌvoɫɡɐˈvʲatskʲɪj])
1. Chuvash Republic
2. Kirov Oblast
3. Mari El Republic
4. Mordovia
5. Nizhny Novgorod Oblast
- West Siberian (Note: Западно-Сибирский, Zapadno-Sibirskiy, IPA: [ˌzapədnə sʲɪˈbʲirskʲɪj])
1. Altai Krai
2. Altai Republic
3. Kemerovo Oblast
4. Khanty–Mansi Autonomous Okrug
5. Novosibirsk Oblast
6. Omsk Oblast
7. Tomsk Oblast
8. Tyumen Oblast
9. Yamalo-Nenets Autonomous Okrug

== See also ==
- List of economic zones and macrozones of Russia
