= West Siberian Economic Region =

Economic region in Russia

West Siberian economic region Западно-Сибирский экономический район
- Economic region
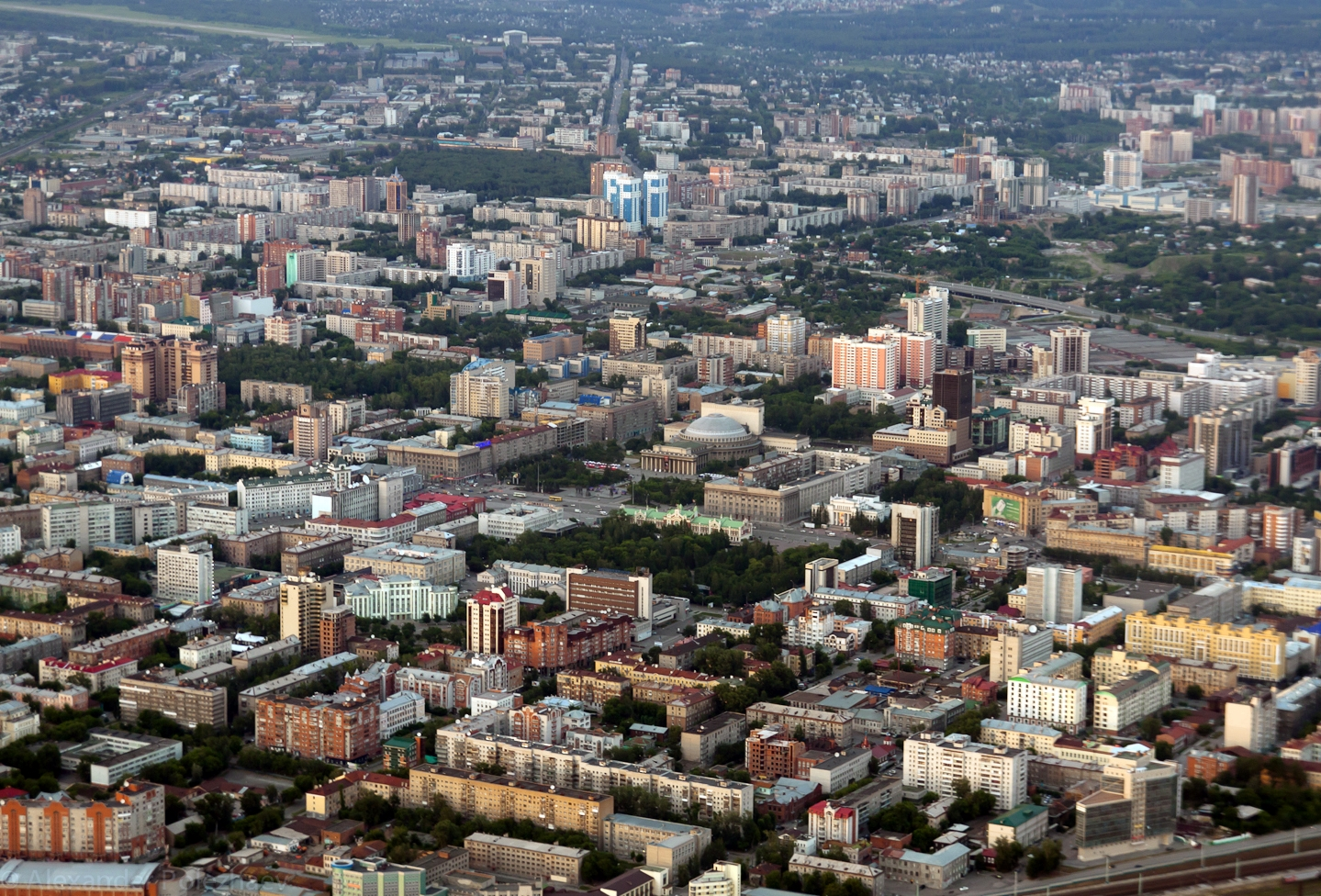
- Novosibirsk, the largest city in the region

- Map of Central Economic Region
- Country: Russia

Area
  - Total: 2,454,084 km^{2} (947,527 sq mi)

Population (2021)
  - Total: 14,453,566
  - Density: 5.889597/km^{2} (15.25399/sq mi)

GDP
  - Total: ₽ 17,250 billion US$ 234.600 billion (2021)

The West Siberian Economic Region (Note: Russian: Западно-Сибирский экономический район, romanized: Zapadno-Sibirskiy ekonomicheskiy rayon, IPA: [ˈzapədnə sʲɪˈbʲirʲsʲkʲɪj ɪkənɐˈmʲitɕɪskʲɪj rɐˈjon]) is one of the twelve economic regions of Russia.

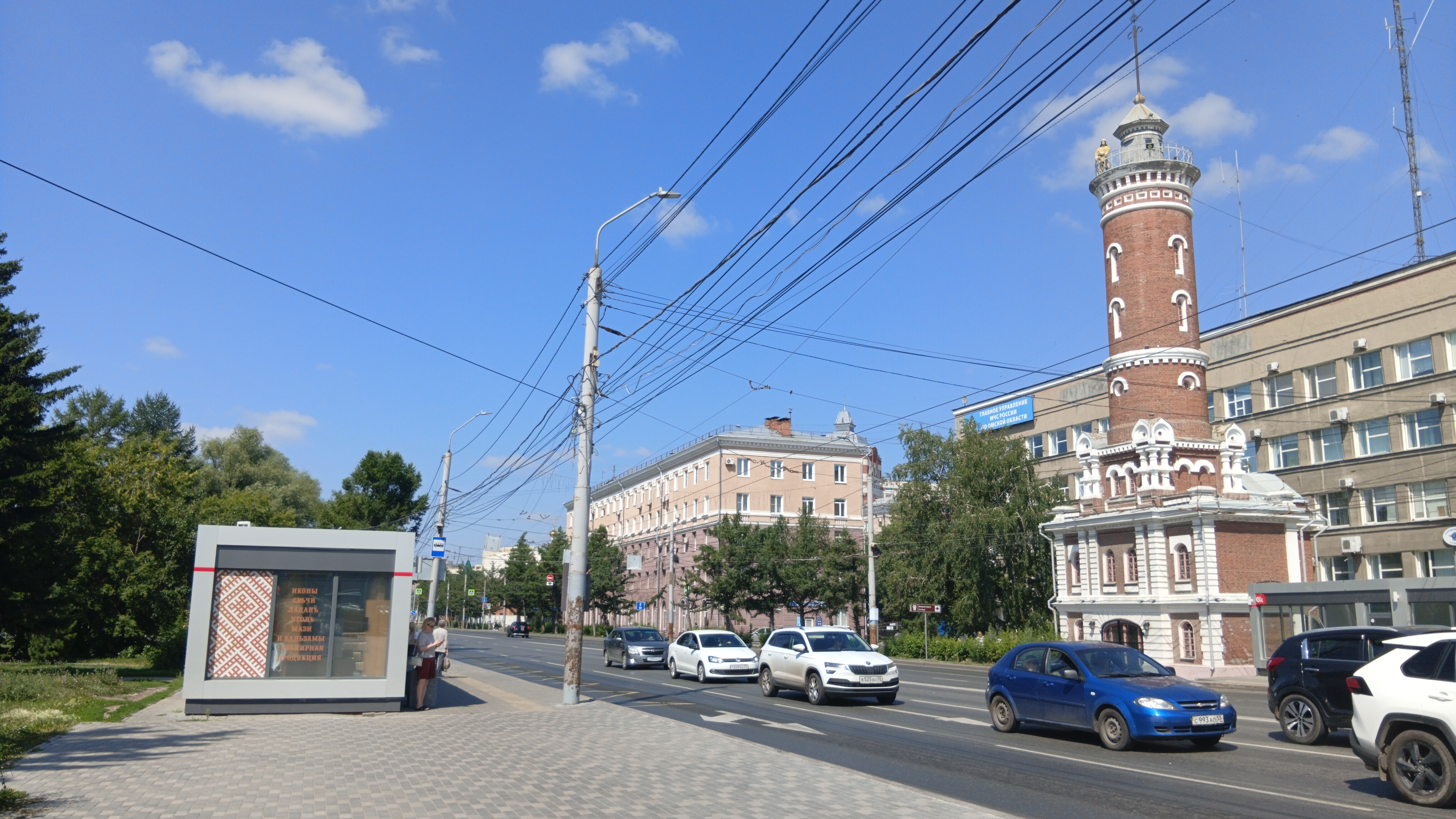
Omsk, one of the largest cities in the region

This vast plain—marshy and thinly populated in the north, hilly in the south—is of growing economic importance, mostly due to the abundance of natural resources: oil, coal, wood, water. There are vast oilfields in the West Siberian petroleum basin, and Russia's largest oil refinery is the Omsk Refinery. The Kuznetsk Basin around Kemerovo and Novokuznetsk is a center of coal mining, and the production of iron, steel, machinery, and chemicals. Logging is a significant industry throughout the region. Hydroelectric stations dam the Ob near Novosibirsk and Kamen-na-Obi. The navigable Ob-Irtysh watershed covers most of this area, and the southern part is also criss-crossed by the Trans-Siberian, South Siberian and Turkestan-Siberian rail lines. Agricultural products include wheat, rice, oats, and sugar beets, and livestock is raised.

== Composition ==
- Altai Krai (part of Siberian Federal District)
- Altai Republic (part of Siberian Federal District)
- Kemerovo Oblast (part of Siberian Federal District)
- Novosibirsk Oblast (part of Siberian Federal District)
- Omsk Oblast (part of Siberian Federal District)
- Tomsk Oblast (part of Siberian Federal District)
- Khanty–Mansi Autonomous Okrug (part of Ural Federal District)
- Tyumen Oblast (part of Ural Federal District)
- Yamalo-Nenets Autonomous Okrug (part of Ural Federal District)

== Socio-economic indicators ==
West Siberian economic region accounted for 21% of the national GRP in 2008. The official economic statistics give a positive profile to this region. Not only is GDP in total high due to its substantial total population, but also reported GDP per capita is almost half above the Russian mean, as is industrial productivity. In keeping with this, wage levels are a third above the national average. However, the likelihood of getting paid in full is 14% below the national level. The region's economy is, moreover, relatively low in privatized ex-state enterprises, and only average in new private sector employment.

Levels of social welfare are close to the national mean in terms of life expectancy for men and women, and the proportion of students in higher education. However, popular attitudes in the region give a negative picture of West Siberia. Compared to other regions, people are much less likely to expect life to improve, and are even more negative in their rating of the national economy.
