= Northwestern Economic Region =

Economic region in Russia

Northwestern Economic Region Се́веро-За́падный Экономи́ческий Райо́н
- Economic region
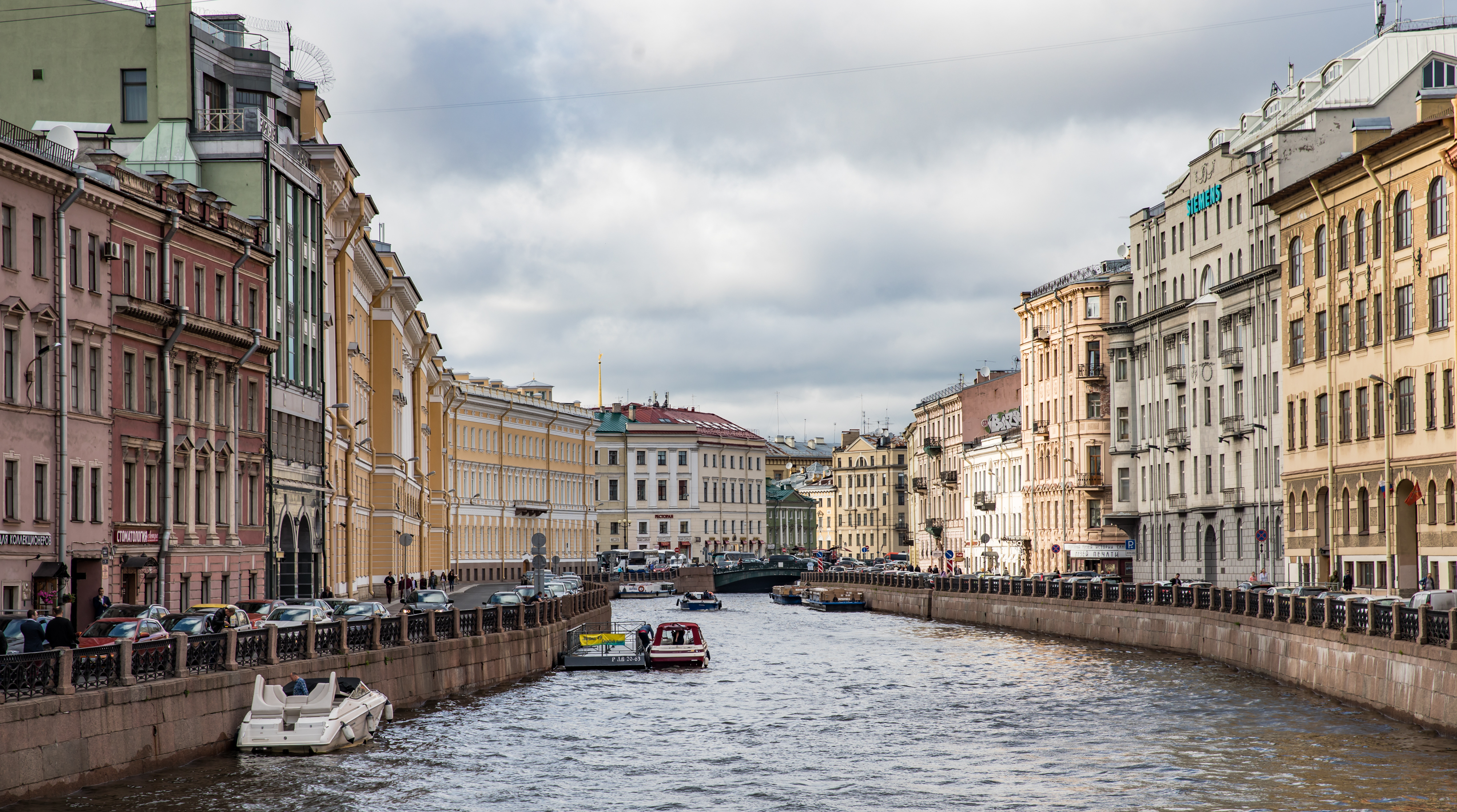
- Saint Petersburg, the largest city in the region

- Map of Northwestern economic region
- Country: Russia
- Largest city: Saint Petersburg

Area
  - Total: 195,247 km^{2} (75,385 sq mi)

Population (2021)
  - Total: 8,785,379
  - Density: 44.9962/km^{2} (116.540/sq mi)

GDP
  - Total: ₽ 13,230 billion US$ 192.610 billion (2022)

The Northwestern Economic Region (Russian: Се́веро-За́падный Экономи́ческий Райо́н; tr.: Severo-Zapadny Ekonomichesky Rayon) is one of twelve economic regions of Russia.

== Composition ==
- Leningrad Oblast
- Novgorod Oblast
- Pskov Oblast
- federal city of St. Petersburg

== Socio-economic indicators ==
The Northwestern Economic Region accounted for 5% of the national GRP in 2008. With its Baltic port and proximity to Finland, this region and its chief city St. Petersburg have always been a Russian window on the west. Its history is very different from that of Moscow and other parts of the Russian Federation. This is reflected in the positive outlook of many residents. The evaluation of the current economy is unusually high by Russian standards, and so too is the expectation of life improving. The region is also a magnet for students seeking higher education.

While nominal income is well below the national average, to a significant extent this is compensated by the fact that the likelihood being paid is well above the national average. Moreover, those finding life bearable are also well above the national average.
