= Federalism in Russia =

Federal subjects of Russia: Republics Krais (territories) Oblasts (regions) Federal cities Autonomous oblast (autonomous region) Autonomous okrugs (autonomous areas with a substantial ethnic minority) Diagonal stripes indicate territory internationally recognized as parts of Ukraine.

Federalism is formally established in the Constitution of Russia, with references to it included in the preamble and throughout the document. In practice, Russia functions as a centralized unitary state under Vladimir Putin, suppressing movements for proper federalism. The current system is influenced by the Soviet era's ethno-territorial pseudo-federalism and is characterized by a centralizing trajectory.

== History ==
On 31 March 1992, the Treaty of Federation between the central Russian government and the federal subjects was signed. Along with establishing a nominally federal structure, it involved an asymmetrically federal system in which so-called "sovereign republics" would be more autonomous than other federal subjects. The republics declared their own sovereignties, but remained a part of the Russian Federation, and the treaty was "sharply skewed toward centralism". Additionally, the 1993 Constitution of Russia abolished these sovereignties altogether, and after changes in the government, leaders of federal subjects began being appointed by Moscow.

In the 1990s, President Yeltsin's administration relied on ad hoc, unconstitutional agreements with regional elites, leading to a fragmented legal framework that undermined federal law coherence.

== Characteristics of Russian federalism ==
While Russia is nominally a federation, in practice it has functioned as a centralized unitary state, especially under the authoritarian regime of Vladimir Putin. Movements in Russia to establish real federalism or regional autonomy are suppressed by authorities, who label proponents of federalism as "dangerous" separatists.

Russian federalism is thus characterized as unstable, marked by imperial remnants rather than democratic pluralism. The federal structure is heavily influenced by the Soviet era, which established undemocratic ethno-territorial pseudo-federalism under centralized control, complicating the subsequent development of a cohesive nation state. As genuine federalism is argued to be impossible without democracy; Russia's authoritarian tendencies result in a system that is federal in name but unitary and imperial in practice. The governance model reflects elite patronage and informal negotiations, resembling imperial rule rather than a true federalist framework.

Because of this, Russian federalism is mostly a bureaucratic term that obscures a hierarchical reality, with vestigial institutions and intentional asymmetries, leading to a distinctly centralizing trajectory.

== Bibliography ==
- Kahn, Jeffrey (13 June 2002). Federalism, Democratization, and the Rule of Law in Russia. OUP Oxford. ISBN 978-0-19-152996-2.
- Rogoża, Jadwiga (April 2014). Federation without federalism. Relations between Moscow and the regions.
- Miller, A.I. (2025). "Russian Federalism and the Rehabilitation of the Empire". Russia in Global Affairs. 23 (1). Foreign Policy Research Foundation: 31–42. doi:10.31278/1810-6374-2025-23-1-31-42.
