= State Anthem of the Republic of Khakassia =

Хакас гимн
English: State Anthem of the Republic of Khakassia
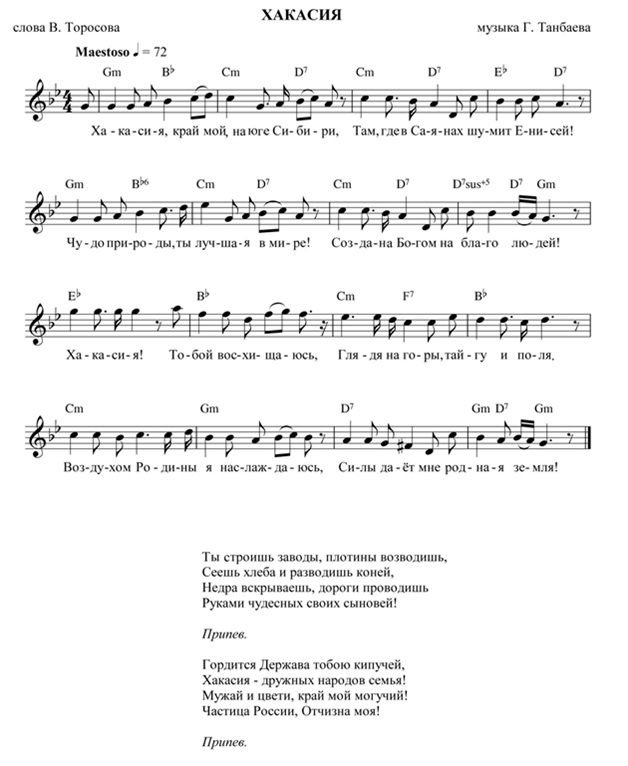
- Sheet music
- Regional anthem of Khakassia, Russia
- Lyrics: Vladislav Torosov (Russian version); V. Shulbayeva and G. Kazachinova (Khakas version), 2014
- Music: German Tanbayev, 2014
- Adopted: 11 February 2015
- Preceded by: "My Khakassia"

Audio sample
- Official orchestral instrumental recording in F minor: file; help

Digital and solo vocal recording version in G minor

The State Anthem of the Republic of Khakassia, a federal subject of Russia, is one of the official state symbols of the republic along with its flag and coat of arms. The anthem was officially adopted on 11 February 2015, which replaced the previous anthem titled "My Khakassia".

The Russian lyrics were written by poet Vladislav Torosov, and the Khakas lyrics were written by authors V. Shulbayeva and G. Kazachinova in 2014. The music was composed by German Tanbayev.

== Lyrics ==
=== Khakas version ===
Cyrillic script

Хакасия! Сибирь кіні чирі,
Сойан тағлары, Ким суғ ағыны.
Чайаан хаңхазы, тилекей сілии!
Ӧӧркілер салған чоннар чырғалы.

Ыр хозымы:
Хакасия! Сағаа хайхапчам,
Kӧpіп чазың, тайға-тағларың
Чир-суум тынызына кӧӧрепче чӱреем,
Кӱс мағаа кирче тӧреен чирім.

Саарлар, тулғорлар син пӱдірчезің.
Ас таарыпчазың, аттарға пайзың,
Анып чир пайын, чоллар салчазың,
Алып оолларның маха кӱзӱнең.

Ыр хозымы

Илбек хазнабыс синнең чазаалча,
Чоннар бувайым (Note: Sometimes written пубайым.) - ада чирібіс!
Ӧңненып ызых, Чир-суум чазанча,
Россия ӧмезі - Хакасиямыс!

Ыр хозымы

Latin script

Hakasia! Sibir kını şirı,
Soian tağlary, Kim suğ ağyny.
Şaiaan hañhazy, tilekei sılii!
Öörkıler salğan şonnar şyrğaly.

Yr hozymy:
Hakasia! Sağaa haihapşam,
Körıp şazyñ, taiğa-tağlaryñ.
Şir-suum tynyzyna köörepşe şüreem,
Küs mağaa kirşe töreen şirım.

Saarlar, tulğorlar sin püdırşezıñ.
As taarypşazyñ, attarğa paizyñ,
Anyp şir paiyn, şollar salşazyñ,
Alyp oollarnyñ maha küzıneñ.

Yr hozymy

İlbek haznabys sinneñ şazaalşa,
Şonnar buwaiym — ada şirıbız!
Öñnenyp yzyh, Şir-suum şazanşa,
Rossia ömezı — Hakasiamys!

Yr hozymy

IPA transcription

[χɑ.ˈqɑ.si.jɑ ǀ si.ˈbirʲ kɘ.ˈnɘ ɕi.ˈrɘ |]
[sɔ.ˈjɑn ˌtɑʁ.ɫɑ.ˈrɯ ǀ kim suʁ ˌɑ.ʁɯ.ˈnɯ ǁ]
[ɕɑ.ˈjɑːn ˌχɑɴ.χɑ.ˈzɯ ǀ ˌti.lɛ.ˈkɛj sɘ.ˈliː ǀ]
[ˌœːr.ki.ˈlɛr sɑɫ.ˈʁɑn ɕɔn.ˈnɑr ˌɕɯr.ʁɑ.ˈɫɯ ǁ]

[ɯr ˌχɔ.zɯ.ˈmɯ]
[χɑ.ˈqɑ.si.jɑ ǀ sɑ.ˈʁɑː ˌχɑj.χɑp.ˈɕɑm ǀ]
[kœ.ˈrɘp ɕɑ.ˈzɯɴ ǀ tɑj.ˈʁɑ ˌtɑʁ.ɫɑ.ˈrɯɴ ǁ]
[ɕir.ˈsuːm tɯ.ˌnɯ.zɯ.ˈnɑ ˌkœː.rɛp.ˈɕɛ ɕʏ.ˈrɛːm ǀ]
[kʏs mɑ.ˈʁɑː kir.ˈɕɛ tœ.ˈrɛːn ɕi.ˈrɘm ǁ]

[sɑːr.ˈɫɑr ǀ ˌtuɫ.ʁɔr.ˈɫar sin pʏ.ˌdɘr.ɕɛ.ˈzɯɴ ǀ]
[ɑs tɑ.ˌrɯp.ɕɑ.ˈzɯɴ ǀ ˌɑt.tɑr.ˈʁɑ pɑj.ˈzɯɴ ‖]
[ɑ.ˈnɯp ɕir pɑ.ˈɴɯɴ ǀ ɕɔɫ.ˈɫɑr ˌsɑɫ.ɕɑ.ˈzɯɴ ǀ]
[ɑ.ˈɫɯp ˌɔːɫ.ɫɑr.ˈnɯɴ mɑ.ˈχɑ ˌkʏ.zɯ.ˈnɛŋ ‖]

[ɯr ˌχɔ.zɯ.ˈmɯ]

[il.ˈbɛk ˌχɑz.nɑ.ˈbɯs sin.ˈnɛŋ ˌɕɑ.zɑːɫ.ˈɕɑ ǀ]
[ɕɔn.ˈnɑr ˌbu.ʋɑ.ˈjɯm ǀ ɑ.ˈdɑ ˌɕi.rɘ.ˈbɘz ǁ]
[ˌœŋ.nɛ.ˈnɯp ɯ.ˈzɯχ ǀ ɕir.ˈsuːm ˌɕɑ.zɑɲ.ˈɕɑ ǀ]
[rɔ.ˈsi.jɑ ˌœ.mɛ.ˈzɘ ǀ χɑ.ˈqɑ.si.jɑ.ˈmɯs ǁ]

[ɯr ˌχɔ.zɯ.ˈmɯ]

=== Russian version ===
Original

Хакасия, край мой, на Юге Сибири, (Note: Alternatively sung as «Хакасия, край мой, в центре Сибири».)
Там, где в Саянах шумит (Note: Alternatively «кипит».) Енисей!
Чудо природы, ты лучшая в мире!
Создана Богом на благо людей!

Припев:
Хакасия! Тобой восхищаюсь,
Глядя на горы, тайгу и поля.
Воздухом Родины я наслаждаюсь, (Note: Also sung as «Древним курганам я поклоняюсь».)
Силы дает мне родная земля! (Note: Also sung as «Родина предков – святая земля».)

Ты строишь заводы, плотины возводишь, (Note: «Ты» is sometimes omitted.)
Сеешь хлеба и разводишь коней,
Недра вскрываешь, дороги проводишь
Руками чудесных (Note: Alternatively «прекрасных».) своих сыновей!

Припев

Гордится Держава тобою кипучей,
Хакасия – дружных народов семья!
Мужай и цвети, край мой могучий!
Частица России, Отчизна моя!

Припев

Romanized text

Khakásiya, kray moy, na Yúge Sibíri,
Tam, gde v Sayánakh shumít Yeniséy!
Chúdo priródy, ty lúchshaya v míre!
Sozdána Bógom na blágo lyúdey!

Prípev:
Khakásiya! Tobóy voskhishcháyus,
Glyádya na góry, táygu i pólya.
Vózdukhom Ródiny ya naslazhdáyus,
Síly dayót mne rodnáya zemlyá!

Ty stróish zavódy, plotíny vozvodísh,
Séyesh khléba i razvódish konéy,
Nédra vskryváyesh, dorógi provódish
Rukámi chudésnykh (Note: Alternatively «прекрасных».) svoíkh synovéy!

Prípev

Gordítsya Derzháva tobóyu kípuchey,
Khakásiya – drúzhnykh naródov semiá!
Muzháy i cvetí, kray moy mogúchiy!
Chastíca Rossíi, Otchízna moyá!

Prípev

== See also ==
- Music in Khakassia
