= List of federal subjects of Russia by population =

The following is a list of 83 of the 89 (Note: Perm Krai was formed on December 1, 2005 as a result of the merger of Perm Oblast and Komi-Permyak Autonomous Okrug. Evenk Autonomous Okrug and Taymyr Autonomous Okrug were merged into Krasnoyarsk Krai in 2007. Ust-Orda Buryat Autonomous Okrug was merged into Irkutsk Oblast in 2008. Zabaykalsky Krai was formed on March 1, 2008 as a result of the merger of Chita Oblast and Agin-Buryat Autonomous Okrug. The population counts of the defunct federal subjects were added up in the 2002 column.) federal subjects of Russia in order of population according to the 2010 and 2021 Russian Census. The totals of all federal subjects do not include nationals living abroad at the time of census.

== Most recent estimates ==
Federal subject	Type	2025 estimate	2021 Census	% change	Area (km^{2})	Density (/km^{2})
Russian Federation		143,569,049	144,699,673	−0.78%	17,098,246	8.40
Moscow	Federal city	13,258,262	13,010,112	+1.91%	2,561	5176.99
Moscow Oblast	Oblast	8,766,594	8,524,665	+2.84%	44,329	197.76
Krasnodar Krai	Krai	5,841,846	5,838,273	+0.06%	75,485	77.39
Saint Petersburg	Federal city	5,645,943	5,601,911	+0.79%	1,403	4024.19
Sverdlovsk Oblast	Oblast	4,218,204	4,268,998	−1.19%	194,307	21.71
Rostov Oblast	Oblast	4,135,018	4,200,729	−1.56%	100,967	40.95
Bashkortostan	Republic	4,046,094	4,091,423	−1.11%	142,947	28.30
Tatarstan	Republic	4,016,571	4,004,809	+0.29%	67,847	59.20
Chelyabinsk Oblast	Oblast	3,383,188	3,431,224	−1.40%	88,529	38.22
Dagestan	Republic	3,258,993	3,182,054	+2.42%	50,270	64.83
Samara Oblast	Oblast	3,108,944	3,172,925	−2.02%	53,565	58.04
Nizhny Novgorod Oblast	Oblast	3,037,816	3,119,115	−2.61%	76,624	39.65
Stavropol Krai	Krai	2,883,494	2,907,593	−0.83%	66,160	43.58
Krasnoyarsk Krai	Krai	2,837,374	2,856,971	−0.69%	2,366,797	1.20
Novosibirsk Oblast	Oblast	2,784,587	2,797,176	−0.45%	177,756	15.67
Kemerovo Oblast	Oblast	2,526,384	2,600,923	−2.87%	95,725	26.39
Perm Krai	Krai	2,482,080	2,532,405	−1.99%	160,236	15.49
Volgograd Oblast	Oblast	2,435,355	2,500,781	−2.62%	112,877	21.58
Saratov Oblast	Oblast	2,368,387	2,442,575	−3.04%	101,240	23.39
Irkutsk Oblast	Oblast	2,316,571	2,370,102	−2.26%	774,846	2.99
Voronezh Oblast	Oblast	2,259,610	2,308,792	−2.13%	52,216	43.27
Altai Krai	Krai	2,098,979	2,163,693	−2.99%	167,996	12.49
Leningrad Oblast	Oblast	2,057,708	2,000,997	+2.83%	83,908	24.52
Orenburg Oblast	Oblast	1,815,655	1,862,767	−2.53%	123,702	14.68
Omsk Oblast	Oblast	1,805,443	1,858,798	−2.87%	141,140	12.79
Primorsky Krai	Krai	1,798,047	1,845,165	−2.55%	164,673	10.92
Khanty–Mansi A.O. (Yugra)	Autonomous okrug	1,779,510	1,711,480	+3.97%	534,801	3.33
Tyumen Oblast	Oblast	1,625,129	1,601,940	+1.45%	160,122	10.15
Chechnya	Republic	1,575,819	1,510,824	+4.30%	16,165	97.48
Belgorod Oblast	Oblast	1,481,098	1,540,486	−3.86%	27,134	54.58
Tula Oblast	Oblast	1,455,911	1,501,214	−3.02%	25,679	56.70
Udmurtia	Republic	1,427,018	1,452,914	−1.78%	42,061	33.93
Vladimir Oblast	Oblast	1,295,930	1,348,134	−3.87%	29,084	44.56
Khabarovsk Krai	Krai	1,273,093	1,292,944	−1.54%	787,633	1.62
Penza Oblast	Oblast	1,225,984	1,266,348	−3.19%	43,352	28.28
Tver Oblast	Oblast	1,189,685	1,230,171	−3.29%	84,201	14.13
Yaroslavl Oblast	Oblast	1,179,301	1,209,811	−2.52%	36,177	32.60
Ulyanovsk Oblast	Oblast	1,164,837	1,196,745	−2.67%	37,181	31.33
Chuvashia	Republic	1,159,757	1,186,909	−2.29%	18,343	63.23
Bryansk Oblast	Oblast	1,132,475	1,169,161	−3.14%	34,857	32.49
Kirov Oblast	Oblast	1,120,178	1,153,680	−2.90%	120,374	9.31
Vologda Oblast	Oblast	1,114,639	1,142,827	−2.47%	144,527	7.71
Lipetsk Oblast	Oblast	1,107,812	1,143,224	−3.10%	24,047	46.07
Ryazan Oblast	Oblast	1,073,981	1,102,810	−2.61%	39,605	27.12
Kaluga Oblast	Oblast	1,064,747	1,069,904	−0.48%	29,777	35.76
Kursk Oblast	Oblast	1,050,134	1,082,458	−2.99%	29,997	35.01
Tomsk Oblast	Oblast	1,039,458	1,062,666	−2.18%	314,391	3.31
Kaliningrad Oblast	Oblast	1,033,128	1,029,966	+0.31%	15,125	68.31
Sakha (Yakutia)	Republic	1,007,058	995,686	+1.14%	3,083,523	0.33
Zabaykalsky Krai	Krai	982,525	1,004,125	−2.15%	431,892	2.27
Buryatia	Republic	970,679	978,588	−0.81%	351,334	2.76
Arkhangelsk Oblast (Note: Excluding Nenets Autonomous Okrug.)	Oblast	947,192	978,873	−3.24%	413,103	2.29
Tambov Oblast	Oblast	946,010	982,991	−3.76%	34,462	27.45
Astrakhan Oblast	Oblast	945,991	960,142	−1.47%	49,024	19.30
Kabardino-Balkaria	Republic	908,090	904,200	+0.43%	12,470	72.82
Ivanovo Oblast	Oblast	897,869	927,828	−3.23%	21,437	41.88
Smolensk Oblast	Oblast	857,847	888,421	−3.44%	49,779	17.23
Mordovia	Republic	758,390	783,552	−3.21%	26,128	29.03
Amur Oblast	Oblast	750,870	766,912	−2.09%	361,908	2.07
Kurgan Oblast	Oblast	744,197	776,661	−4.18%	71,488	10.41
Komi Republic	Republic	714,391	737,853	−3.18%	416,774	1.71
Oryol Oblast	Oblast	685,693	713,374	−3.88%	24,652	27.81
North Ossetia–Alania	Republic	678,454	687,357	−1.30%	7,987	84.94
Mari El	Republic	665,983	677,097	−1.64%	23,375	28.49
Murmansk Oblast	Oblast	650,920	667,744	−2.52%	144,902	4.49
Pskov Oblast	Oblast	574,199	599,084	−4.15%	55,399	10.36
Novgorod Oblast	Oblast	566,745	583,387	−2.85%	54,501	10.40
Kostroma Oblast	Oblast	560,758	580,976	−3.48%	60,211	9.31
Ingushetia	Republic	534,219	509,541	+4.84%	3,628	147.25
Khakassia	Republic	525,451	534,795	−1.75%	61,569	8.53
Yamalo Nenets A.O.	Autonomous Okrug	521,655	510,490	+2.19%	769,250	0.68
Karelia	Republic	518,644	533,121	−2.72%	180,520	2.87
Adygea	Republic	501,038	496,934	+0.83%	7,792	64.30
Karachay-Cherkessia	Republic	468,531	469,865	−0.28%	14,277	32.82
Sakhalin Oblast	Oblast	456,792	466,609	−2.10%	87,101	5.24
Tuva	Republic	338,341	336,651	+0.50%	168,604	2.01
Kamchatka Krai	Krai	287,949	291,705	−1.29%	464,275	0.62
Kalmykia	Republic	267,376	267,133	+0.09%	74,731	3.58
Altai Republic	Republic	210,099	210,924	−0.39%	92,903	2.26
Jewish Autonomous Oblast	Autonomous Oblast	144,389	150,453	−4.03%	36,271	3.98
Magadan Oblast	Oblast	134,202	136,085	−1.38%	462,464	0.29
Chukotka	Autonomous Okrug	47,902	47,490	+0.87%	721,481	0.07
Nenets Autonomous Okrug	Autonomous Okrug	41,829	41,434	+0.95%	176,810	0.24

== See also ==
- List of federal subjects of Russia by area
- List of cities and towns in Russia by population
- List of federal subjects of Russia by life expectancy
