= My Khakassia =

Former regional anthem of Khakassia, Russia (2007–2015)

Моя Хакасия
English: 'My Khakassia'
- Former regional anthem of Khakassia, Russia
- Also known as: Khakas: Хакас Республиказы Гимн; Russian: Гимн Республики Хакасии
- Lyrics: Olga Krivenko
- Music: Tatiana Shalginova
- Adopted: 2007
- Relinquished: 11 February 2015
- Succeeded by: State Anthem of the Republic of Khakassia

"My Khakassia" (Russian: Моя Хакасия), originally titled was the regional anthem of Khakassia, a republic of Russia. It was adopted in 2007 and relinquished on 11 February 2015, when the current State Anthem of the Republic of Khakassia was officially adopted.

== History ==
"My Khakassia" won a contest in 2007, in which it was selected to be the regional anthem of Khakassia. However, a new contest was held in 2013, in which another song was selected to be the new regional anthem; thus replacing "My Khakassia".

== Lyrics ==
Khakas and Russian

Cyrillic script

Чайылған ӱнніг халын тайға
Чарых ӱннең яңыланды.
Чылтырапчатхан ах тасхыллар
Чалахай ӧңнең чарылдырды.

𝄆 Ах порчо чіли сiліг ӧңде,
Арғал чоннарым, öңненiңер!
Амал часкалығ хонииңарда
Алтын-кӱмӱснең сулғаныңар! 𝄇

Шёпот тайги, запах степей,
Море жарков, крик журавлей.
К сопкам летит песня моя,
Всё о тебе, Хакасия!

𝄆 Хакасия, край мой Добра и Любви!
К тебе возвращаюсь хоть с края земли!
Твой ласковый голос, как звон серебра,
Хакасия, край мой, Любви и Добра! 𝄇

Latin script

Şaiylğan ünnıg halyn taiğa
Şaryh ünneñ iañylandy.
Şyltyrapşathan ah tashyllar
Şalahai öñneñ şaryldyrdy.

𝄆 Ah porşo şıli sılıg öñde,
Arğal şonnarym, öñnenıñer!
Amal şaskalyğ honiiñarda
Altyn-kümüsneñ sulğanyñar! 𝄇

Shyopot taygi, zapakh stepey,
More zharkov, krik zhuravley.
K sopkam letit pesnya moya,
Vsyo o tebe, Khakasiya!

𝄆 Khakasiya, kray moy Dobra i Lyubvi!
K tebe vozvrashchаyus' khot' s kraya zemli!
Tvoy laskovyy golos, kak zvon serebra,
Khakasiya, kray moy, Lyubvi i Dobra! 𝄇

English

The dense taiga's voice continuously echoeth,
The bright voice of the echo respondeth.
White mountain peaks glittering,
With pretty heavenly lights shining.

𝄆 Like sheen flowers on this fine land,
O mighty people, prosper!
May thy life be forever joyous,
May my land of gold be prosperous! 𝄇

The whisper of taigas, the scent of steppes fair,
The shining lakes, the cranes ablare.
My song flieth o'er the hills,
All about thee, Khakassia!

𝄆 Khakassia, my land of goodness and love!
I shall to thee return till the earth's demise!
Thy gentle voice like silver chime,
Khakassia, my land of love and goodness 𝄇

=== Alternate lyrics ===
Khakas and Russian

Cyrillic script

Алтон азырлығ ағын суғлар
Адам чирінде чайылзын!
Ах чазыларның аллығ тынызы
Алып чоннарға кӱзін пирзін!

Край белоснежных Саянских вершин
Древний и юный, ты в мире один!
В священных курганах вся мудрость твоя,
Хакасия край мой родная земля!

Эта земля дом наш родной
Связаны мы единой судьбой!
Пусть обретёт счастье навек
Каждый живущий здесь человек!

𝄆 Хакасия край мой, добра и любви
Живут здесь, как братья, народы твои!
Трудом, созиданьем прославим тебя,
Хакасия край мой, святая земля! 𝄇

Latin script

Alton azyrlyğ ağyn suğlar
Adam şirınde şaiylzyn!
Ah şazylarnyñ allyğ tynyzy
Alyp çonnarğa küzın pirzın!

Kray belosnezhnykh Sayanskikh vershin
Drevniy i yunyy, ty v mire odin!
V svyashchennykh kurganakh vsya mudrost' tvoya,
Khakasiya kray moy rodnaya zemlya!

Eta zemlya dom nash rodnoy
Svyazany my yedinoy sud'boy!
Pust' obretyot schast'ye navek
Kazhdyy zhivushchiy zdes' chelovek!

𝄆 Khakasia kray moy, dobra i lyubvi
Zhivut zdes', kak brat'ya, narody tvoi!
Trudom, sozidan'yem proslavim tebya,
Khakasiya kray moy, svyataya zemlya! 𝄇

English

With sixty streams of running rivers,
May they spread around the motherland!
The wide breadth of flowering steppes,
Give strength to glorious peoples!

Land of snow-white Sayan peaks,
Ancient and young, thou art one and only!
All thy wisdom is in sacred mounds,
Khakassia is my native land!

This land is our home
We are bound by one destiny!
May thou find everlasting happiness
For each person living here!

𝄆 Khakassia, my land of goodness and love
Like brothers do thy peoples live!
By labour, by creation we shall glorify thee,
Khakassia is my land, my holy land! 𝄇

== See also ==
- Music in Khakassia
