= Declaration of State Sovereignty of the Tajik Soviet Socialist Republic =

The Declaration of Sovereignty of the Tajik Soviet Socialist Republic (Note: also titled On the Sovereignty of the Tajik SSR (Russian: О суверенитете Таджикской ССР)) was adopted on August 24, 1990, by the Supreme Soviet of the Tajik SSR during its second session. The document proclaimed that the republic would independently resolve all political and economic issues on its territory and empowered the Supreme Soviet to terminate Soviet laws that contradicted Tajikistan’s legal rights. Adopted during a time of intense political confrontation and the collapse of the Soviet Union, it reflected a move to assert republican control. This declaration was the first document that foreshadowed the path to real independence and laid the foundation for the future of the country.

== History ==
The path toward modern Tajik statehood began in the late 1980s, amidst political processes that saw union republics within the Soviet Union start declaring state sovereignties. This was a new stage in a longer historical path, with the modern process beginning as the Soviet Union started to collapse. The political atmosphere within Tajikistan at the time was one of confrontation, which set the stage for a formal declaration of its rights. This period is considered the beginning of a completely new era in the history of Tajik statehood and public administration.

On August 24, 1990, at the second session of the 12th convocation of the Supreme Soviet of the Tajik SSR, the resolution titled "On the Sovereignty of the Tajik SSR" was adopted. This initial declaration proclaimed sovereignty while the republic was still a part of the Soviet Union. It stated that the Tajik SSR would independently resolve all political and economic issues on its territory, except for those it voluntarily transferred to the Soviet Union's competence. A key part was the Article No. 5 within the declaration, which empowered the republic to terminate Soviet documents that contradicting its legal rights.

Following the attempted coup in Moscow in August 1991, the processes for declaring full national independence intensified across the union republics. Consequently, on September 9, 1991, at a session of the Supreme Soviet, the definitive Resolution and Statement “On the state independence of the Republic of Tajikistan” were adopted. However, the political situation in Tajikistan after it gained independence became extremely difficult, as the country descended into a civil war that caused chaos and lawlessness. This crisis led to the historic 16th session of the Supreme Soviet in November 1992, which laid the legislative foundation to end the conflict and preserve the country.
