= Federal subjects of Russia =

Federal constituent entities of Russia

Federal subjects Субъекты федерации (Russian)
- Republics Krais (territories) Oblasts (regions) Federal cities Autonomous oblast (autonomous region) Autonomous okrugs (autonomous areas with a substantial ethnic minority) Diagonal stripes indicate territory internationally recognized as parts of Ukraine.
- Category: Federal semi-presidential constitutional republic
- Location: Russian Federation
- Created: 31 March 1992 (de facto) 12 December 1993 (de jure)
- Number: 83 (+6 unrecognized)
- Populations: 41,431 (Nenets Autonomous Okrug) – 13,010,112 (Moscow)
- Areas: 864 km^{2} (334 sq mi) (Sevastopol) – 3,103,200 km^{2} (1,198,200 sq mi) (Sakha Republic)
- Government: Regional governments, federal government
- Subdivisions: Districts

The federal subjects of Russia, also referred to as the subjects of the Russian Federation (Russian: субъекты Российской Федерации, romanized: subyekty Rossiyskoy Federatsii) or simply as the subjects of the federation (Russian: субъекты федерации, romanized: subyekty federatsii), are the constituent entities of Russia, its top-level political divisions. According to the Constitution of Russia, the federation consists of republics, krais, oblasts, cities of federal importance, an autonomous oblast, and autonomous okrugs, all of which are equal subjects of the federation.

Every federal subject has its own head, a parliament, and a constitutional court. Each subject has its own constitution or charter and legislation, although the authority of these organs differ. Subjects have equal rights in relations with federal government bodies. The subjects have equal representation – two delegates each – in the Federation Council, the upper house of the Federal Assembly. They differ in the degree of autonomy they enjoy; republics are offered more autonomy.

Post-Soviet Russia formed during the history of the Russian Soviet Federative Socialist Republic within the USSR and did not change at the time of the dissolution of the Soviet Union in 1991. In 1992, during the so-called "parade of sovereignties", separatist sentiments and the War of Laws within Russia, the Russian regions signed the Federation Treaty (Russian: Федеративный договор, romanized: Federativnyy dogovor), establishing and regulating the current inner composition of Russia, based on the division of authorities and powers among Russian government bodies and government bodies of constituent entities. The Federation Treaty was included in the text of the 1978 Constitution of the Russian SFSR. The current Constitution of Russia, adopted by federal referendum on 12 December 1993, came into force on 25 December 1993 and abolished the model of the Soviet system of government introduced in 1918 by Vladimir Lenin and based on the right to secede from the country and on unlimited sovereignty of federal subjects (in practice secession was never allowed), which conflicts with the country's integrity and federal laws. The new constitution eliminated a number of legal conflicts, reserved the rights of the regions, introduced local self-government and did not grant the Soviet-era right to secede from the country. In the late 1990s and early 2000s the political system became de jure closer to other modern federal states with a republican form of government. In the 2000s, following the policies of Vladimir Putin and of the ruling United Russia party, the Russian parliament changed the distribution of tax revenues, reduced the number of elections in the regions and gave more power to the federal authorities.

The Russian Federation was composed of 89 federal subjects in 1993. Mergers reduced the number to 83 by 2008. Russia annexed Crimea from Ukraine in 2014, with the Russian government claiming Sevastopol and the Republic of Crimea to be the 84th and 85th federal subjects of Russia, a move that is not recognized internationally. During the 2022 Russian invasion of Ukraine, Russia claimed that it had annexed four Ukrainian oblasts, though they remain internationally recognized as part of Ukraine and are only partially occupied by Russia.

== Terminology ==
An official government translation of the Constitution of Russia from Russian to English uses the term "constituent entities of the Russian Federation". For example, Article 5 reads: "The Russian Federation shall consist of republics, krais, oblasts, cities of federal significance, an autonomous oblast, and autonomous okrugs, which shall have equal rights as constituent entities of the Russian Federation." A translation provided by Garant-Internet instead uses the term "subjects of the Russian Federation".

Tom Fennell, a translator, told the 2008 American Translators Association conference that "constituent entity of the Russian Federation" is a better translation than "subject". This was supported by Tamara Nekrasova, Head of Translation Department at Goltsblat BLP, who said in a 2011 presentation at a translators conference that "constituent entity of the Russian Federation is more appropriate than subject of the Russian Federation (subject would be OK for a monarchy)".

Rank (as given in constitution and ISO)	Russian		English translations of the constitution		ISO 3166-2:RU (ISO 3166-2 Newsletter II-2 (2010-06-30))
Rank (as given in constitution and ISO)	Cyrillic	Latin	Official	Unofficial	ISO 3166-2:RU (ISO 3166-2 Newsletter II-2 (2010-06-30))
—N/a	субъект Российской Федерации	sub'yekt Rossiyskoy Federatsii	constituent entity of the Russian Federation	subject of the Russian Federation	(not mentioned)
1	республика	respublika	republic		
2	край	kray		territory	administrative territory
3	область	oblastʹ	oblast	region	administrative region
3	город федерального значения	gorod federalʹnogo znacheniya	city of federal significance	city of federal importance	autonomous city (the Russian term used in ISO 3166-2 is автономный город avtonomnyy gorod)
5	автономная область	avtonomnaya oblastʹ	autonomous oblast	autonomous region	autonomous region
6	автономный округ	avtonomnyy okrug	autonomous okrug	autonomous area	autonomous district

== Types ==

Each federal subject belongs to one of the following types:

Legend	Description
21 republics 3 unrecognized	Nominally autonomous prior to 2017, each with its own constitution, language, and legislature, but represented by the federal government in international affairs. Most are designated as the home to a specific ethnic minority as their titular nation or nations. Donetsk Oblast and Luhansk Oblast are internationally recognized as parts of Ukraine, but were partially occupied by Russian and Russian-controlled forces in 2014, and declared annexed by Russia as the Donetsk People's Republic and the Luhansk People's Republic in 2022. The Autonomous Republic of Crimea is internationally recognized as a part of Ukraine, but was occupied and annexed by Russia as the Republic of Crimea in 2014.
9 krais	For all intents and purposes, krais are legally identical to oblasts. The title "krai" ("frontier" or "territory") is historic, related to geographic (frontier) position in a certain period of history. The current krais are not related to frontiers.
46 oblasts 2 unrecognized	The most common type, with a governor and locally elected legislature. Commonly named after their administrative centres. Kaliningrad Oblast is geographically separated from all the rest of Russia by other countries and the Baltic Sea. Kherson Oblast and Zaporizhzhia Oblast are internationally recognized as parts of Ukraine, but were partially occupied by Russian forces and declared annexed in 2022.
2 federal cities 1 unrecognized	Major cities that function as separate regions and include other cities and towns (Zelenograd, Troitsk, Kronstadt, Kolpino, etc.) – keeping older structures of postal addresses. Sevastopol is internationally recognized as a part of Ukraine, but was occupied and annexed by Russia in 2014.
1 autonomous oblast	An Autonomous Oblast has increased powers compared to traditional oblasts, but not enough to be considered a Republic. The only one remaining is the Jewish Autonomous Oblast; Russia previously had 4 other Autonomous Oblasts that were changed into Republics on 3 July 1991.
4 autonomous okrugs	Occasionally referred to as "autonomous district", "autonomous area" or "autonomous region", each with a substantial or predominant ethnic minority designated as its titular nation. With the exception of Chukotka, each of the autonomous okrugs is part of another oblast (Arkhangelsk or Tyumen), as well as functioning as a federal subject by itself.

== List ==
Federal subjects of the Russian Federation
Code	Name	Capital/ administrative centre^{[a]}	Flag	Coat of arms	Type	Titular nation	Head of subject	Federal district	Economic region	Area (km^{2})	Population		Est.
Code	Name	Capital/ administrative centre^{[a]}	Flag	Coat of arms	Type	Titular nation	Head of subject	Federal district	Economic region	Area (km^{2})	Total	Density (km^{2})	Est.
01	Adygea	Maykop			republic	Circassians	Murat Kumpilov (UR)	Southern	North Caucasus	7,792	501,038	64.30	1922
02	Bashkortostan	Ufa			republic	Bashkirs	Radiy Khabirov (UR)	Volga	Ural	142,947	4,046,094	28.30	1919
03	Buryatia	Ulan-Ude			republic	Buryats	Alexey Tsydenov (UR)	Far Eastern	East Siberian	351,334	970,679	2.76	1923
04	Altai Republic	Gorno-Altaysk			republic	Altai	Andrey Turchak (UR)	Siberian	West Siberian	92,903	210,099	2.26	1922
05	Dagestan	Makhachkala			republic	Aghuls, Avars, Azerbaijanis, Chechens, Dargins, Kumyks, Laks, Lezgins, Nogais, Rutuls, Tabasarans, Tats, Tsakhurs	Fyodor Shchukin (Ind.)	North Caucasian	North Caucasus	50,270	3,258,993	64.83	1921
06	Ingushetia	Magas (Largest city: Nazran)			republic	Ingush	Mahmud-Ali Kalimatov (UR)	North Caucasian	North Caucasus	3,628	534,219	147.25	1992
07	Kabardino-Balkaria	Nalchik			republic	Balkars, Kabardians	Kazbek Kokov (UR)	North Caucasian	North Caucasus	12,470	908,090	72.82	1936
08	Kalmykia	Elista			republic	Kalmyks	Batu Khasikov (UR)	Southern	Volga	74,731	267,376	3.58	1957
09	Karachay-Cherkessia	Cherkessk			republic	Abazins, Kabardians, Karachays, Nogais	Rashid Temrezov (UR)	North Caucasian	North Caucasus	14,277	468,531	32.82	1957
10	Karelia	Petrozavodsk			republic	Karelians	Artur Parfenchikov (UR)	Northwestern	Northern	180,520	518,644	2.87	1956
11	Komi Republic	Syktyvkar			republic	Komi	Rostislav Goldstein (UR)	Northwestern	Northern	416,774	714,391	1.71	1921
12	Mari El	Yoshkar-Ola			republic	Mari	Yury Zaitsev (UR)	Volga	Volga-Vyatka	23,375	665,983	28.49	1920
13	Mordovia	Saransk			republic	Mordvins	Artyom Zdunov (UR)	Volga	Volga-Vyatka	26,128	758,390	29.03	1930
14	Sakha	Yakutsk			republic	Yakuts	Aysen Nikolayev (UR)	Far Eastern	Far Eastern	3,083,523	1,007,058	0.33	1922
15	North Ossetia–Alania	Vladikavkaz			republic	Ossetians	Sergey Menyaylo (UR)	North Caucasian	North Caucasus	7,987	678,454	84.94	1924
16	Tatarstan	Kazan			republic	Tatars	Rustam Minnikhanov (UR)	Volga	Volga	67,847	4,016,571	59.20	1920
17	Tuva	Kyzyl			republic	Tuvans	Vladislav Khovalyg (UR)	Siberian	East Siberian	168,604	338,341	2.01	1944
18	Udmurtia	Izhevsk			republic	Udmurts	Aleksandr Brechalov (UR)	Volga	Ural	42,061	1,427,018	33.93	1920
19	Khakassia	Abakan			republic	Khakas	Valentin Konovalov (CPRF)	Siberian	East Siberian	61,569	534,795	8.53	1930
20^{[d]}	Chechnya	Grozny			republic	Chechens	Ramzan Kadyrov (UR)	North Caucasian	North Caucasus	16,165	1,575,819	97.48	1991
21	Chuvashia	Cheboksary			republic	Chuvash	Oleg Nikolayev (SR)	Volga	Volga-Vyatka	18,343	1,159,757	63.23	1920
22	Altai Krai	Barnaul			krai	—N/a	Viktor Tomenko (UR)	Siberian	West Siberian	167,996	2,098,979	12.49	1937
23	Krasnodar Krai	Krasnodar			krai	—N/a	Veniamin Kondratyev (UR)	Southern	North Caucasus	75,485	5,841,846	77.39	1937
24	Krasnoyarsk Krai	Krasnoyarsk			krai	—N/a	Mikhail Kotyukov (UR)	Siberian	East Siberian	2,366,797	2,837,374	1.20	1934
25	Primorsky Krai	Vladivostok			krai	—N/a	Oleg Kozhemyako (UR)	Far Eastern	Far Eastern	164,673	1,798,047	10.92	1938
26	Stavropol Krai	Stavropol			krai	—N/a	Vladimir Vladimirov (UR)	North Caucasian	North Caucasus	66,160	2,883,494	43.58	1934
27	Khabarovsk Krai	Khabarovsk			krai	—N/a	Dmitry Demeshin (UR)	Far Eastern	Far Eastern	787,633	1,273,093	1.62	1938
28	Amur Oblast	Blagoveshchensk			oblast	—N/a	Vasily Orlov (UR)	Far Eastern	Far Eastern	361,908	750,870	2.07	1932
29	Arkhangelsk Oblast	Arkhangelsk			oblast	—N/a	Alexander Tsybulsky (UR)	Northwestern	Northern	413,103	947,192	2.29	1937
30	Astrakhan Oblast	Astrakhan			oblast	—N/a	Igor Babushkin (Ind.)	Southern	Volga	49,024	945,991	19.30	1943
31	Belgorod Oblast	Belgorod			oblast	—N/a	Alexander Shuvaev (UR)	Central	Central Black Earth	27,134	1,481,098	54.58	1954
32	Bryansk Oblast	Bryansk			oblast	—N/a	Yegor Kovalchuk (UR)	Central	Central	34,857	1,132,475	32.49	1944
33	Vladimir Oblast	Vladimir			oblast	—N/a	Aleksandr Avdeyev (UR)	Central	Central	29,084	1,295,930	44.56	1944
34	Volgograd Oblast	Volgograd			oblast	—N/a	Andrey Bocharov (Ind.)	Southern	Volga	112,877	2,435,355	21.58	1937
35	Vologda Oblast	Vologda			oblast	—N/a	Georgy Filimonov (UR)	Northwestern	Northern	144,527	1,114,639	7.71	1937
36	Voronezh Oblast	Voronezh			oblast	—N/a	Aleksandr Gusev (UR)	Central	Central Black Earth	52,216	2,259,610	43.27	1934
37	Ivanovo Oblast	Ivanovo			oblast	—N/a	Stanislav Voskresensky (Ind.)	Central	Central	21,437	897,869	41.88	1936
38	Irkutsk Oblast	Irkutsk			oblast	—N/a	Igor Kobzev (UR)	Siberian	East Siberian	774,846	2,316,571	2.99	1937
39	Kaliningrad Oblast	Kaliningrad			oblast	—N/a	Alexey Besprozvannykh (UR)	Northwestern	Kaliningrad	15,125	1,064,747	68.31	1946
40	Kaluga Oblast	Kaluga			oblast	—N/a	Vladislav Shapsha (UR)	Central	Central	29,777	1,064,747	35.76	1944
41	Kamchatka Krai	Petropavlovsk-Kamchatsky			krai	—N/a	Vladimir Solodov (Ind.)	Far Eastern	Far Eastern	464,275	287,949	0.62	2007
42	Kemerovo Oblast	Kemerovo			oblast	—N/a	Ilya Seredyuk (UR)	Siberian	West Siberian	95,725	2,526,384	26.39	1943
43	Kirov Oblast	Kirov			oblast	—N/a	Aleksandr Sokolov (UR)	Volga	Volga-Vyatka	120,374	1,120,178	9.31	1934
44	Kostroma Oblast	Kostroma			oblast	—N/a	Sergey Sitnikov (Ind.)	Central	Central	60,211	560,758	9.31	1944
45	Kurgan Oblast	Kurgan			oblast	—N/a	Vadim Shumkov (Ind.)	Ural	Ural	71,488	744,197	10.41	1943
46	Kursk Oblast	Kursk			oblast	—N/a	Alexander Khinshtein (UR)	Central	Central Black Earth	29,997	1,050,134	35.01	1934
47	Leningrad Oblast	Gatchina^{[b]}			oblast	—N/a	Aleksandr Drozdenko (UR)	Northwestern	Northwestern	83,908	2,057,708	24.52	1927
48	Lipetsk Oblast	Lipetsk			oblast	—N/a	Igor Artamonov (UR)	Central	Central Black Earth	24,047	1,107,812	46.07	1954
49	Magadan Oblast	Magadan			oblast	—N/a	Sergey Nosov (UR)	Far Eastern	Far Eastern	462,464	134,202	0.29	1953
50	Moscow Oblast	Largest city: Balashikha^{[c]}			oblast	—N/a	Andrey Vorobyov (UR)	Central	Central	44,329	8,766,594	197.76	1929
51	Murmansk Oblast	Murmansk			oblast	—N/a	Andrey Chibis (UR)	Northwestern	Northern	144,902	650,920	4.49	1938
52	Nizhny Novgorod Oblast	Nizhny Novgorod			oblast	—N/a	Gleb Nikitin (UR)	Volga	Volga-Vyatka	76,624	3,037,816	39.65	1936
53	Novgorod Oblast	Veliky Novgorod			oblast	—N/a	Aleksandr Dronov (UR)	Northwestern	Northwestern	54,501	566,745	10.40	1944
54	Novosibirsk Oblast	Novosibirsk			oblast	—N/a	Andrey Travnikov (UR)	Siberian	West Siberian	177,756	2,784,587	15.67	1937
55	Omsk Oblast	Omsk			oblast	—N/a	Vitaliy Khotsenko (UR)	Siberian	West Siberian	141,140	1,805,443	12.79	1934
56	Orenburg Oblast	Orenburg			oblast	—N/a	Yevgeny Solntsev (UR)	Volga	Ural	123,702	1,815,655	14.68	1934
57	Oryol Oblast	Oryol			oblast	—N/a	Andrey Klychkov (CPRF)	Central	Central	24,652	685,693	27.81	1937
58	Penza Oblast	Penza			oblast	—N/a	Oleg Melnichenko (UR)	Volga	Volga	43,352	1,225,984	28.28	1939
59	Perm Krai	Perm			krai	—N/a	Dmitry Makhonin (UR)	Volga	Ural	160,236	2,482,080	15.49	2005
60	Pskov Oblast	Pskov			oblast	—N/a	Mikhail Vedernikov (UR)	Northwestern	Northwestern	55,399	574,199	10.36	1944
61	Rostov Oblast	Rostov-on-Don			oblast	—N/a	Yury Slyusar (UR)	Southern	North Caucasus	100,967	4,135,018	40.95	1937
62	Ryazan Oblast	Ryazan			oblast	—N/a	Pavel Malkov (Ind.)	Central	Central	39,605	1,073,981	27.12	1937
63	Samara Oblast	Samara			oblast	—N/a	Vyacheslav Fedorishchev (UR)	Volga	Volga	53,565	3,108,944	58.04	1928
64	Saratov Oblast	Saratov			oblast	—N/a	Roman Busargin (UR)	Volga	Volga	101,240	2,368,387	23.39	1936
65	Sakhalin Oblast	Yuzhno-Sakhalinsk			oblast	—N/a	Valery Limarenko (UR)	Far Eastern	Far Eastern	87,101	456,792	5.24	1947
66	Sverdlovsk Oblast	Yekaterinburg			oblast	—N/a	Denis Pasler (UR)	Ural	Ural	194,307	4,218,204	21.71	1935
67	Smolensk Oblast	Smolensk			oblast	—N/a	Vasily Anokhin (UR)	Central	Central	49,779	857,847	17.23	1937
68	Tambov Oblast	Tambov			oblast	—N/a	Yevgeny Pervyshov (UR)	Central	Central Black Earth	34,462	946,010	27.45	1937
69	Tver Oblast	Tver			oblast	—N/a	Vitaly Korolyov (UR, acting)	Central	Central	84,201	1,189,685	14.13	1935
70	Tomsk Oblast	Tomsk			oblast	—N/a	Vladimir Mazur (UR)	Siberian	West Siberian	314,391	1,039,458	3.31	1944
71	Tula Oblast	Tula			oblast	—N/a	Dmitry Milyaev (UR)	Central	Central	25,679	1,455,911	56.70	1937
72	Tyumen Oblast	Tyumen			oblast	—N/a	Aleksandr Moor (UR)	Ural	West Siberian	160,122	1,625,129	10.15	1944
73	Ulyanovsk Oblast	Ulyanovsk			oblast	—N/a	Aleksey Russkikh (CPRF)	Volga	Volga	37,181	1,164,837	31.33	1943
74	Chelyabinsk Oblast	Chelyabinsk			oblast	—N/a	Aleksey Teksler (UR)	Ural	Ural	88,529	3,383,188	38.22	1934
75	Zabaykalsky Krai	Chita			krai	—N/a	Aleksandr Osipov (Ind.)	Far Eastern	East Siberian	431,892	982,525	2.27	2008
76	Yaroslavl Oblast	Yaroslavl			oblast	—N/a	Mikhail Yevrayev (Ind.)	Central	Central	36,177	1,179,301	32.60	1936
77	Moscow				federal city	—N/a	Sergey Sobyanin (UR)	Central	Central	2,561	13,258,262	5176.99	1147
78	Saint Petersburg				federal city	—N/a	Alexander Beglov (UR)	Northwestern	Northwestern	1,403	5,645,943	4024.19	1703
79	Jewish Autonomous Oblast	Birobidzhan			autonomous oblast	Jews	Maria Kostyuk (UR)	Far Eastern	Far Eastern	36,271	144,389	3.98	1934
83	Nenets Autonomous Okrug	Naryan-Mar			autonomous okrug	Nenets	Irina Gecht (UR)	Northwestern	Northern	176,810	41,829	0.24	1929
86	Khanty-Mansi Autonomous Okrug	Khanty-Mansiysk (Largest city: Surgut)			autonomous okrug	Khanty, Mansi	Ruslan Kukharuk (UR)	Ural	West Siberian	534,801	1,779,510	3.33	1930
87	Chukotka Autonomous Okrug	Anadyr			autonomous okrug	Chukchi	Vladislav Kuznetsov (UR)	Far Eastern	Far Eastern	721,481	47,902	0.07	1930
89	Yamalo-Nenets Autonomous Okrug	Salekhard (Largest city: Novy Urengoy)			autonomous okrug	Nenets	Dmitry Artyukhov (UR)	Ural	West Siberian	769,250	521,655	0.68	1930

Contested territories situated within the internationally recognised borders of Ukraine
Code	Name	Capital / administrative centre^{[a]}	Flag	Coat of arms	Type	Titular nation	Head of subject	Federal district	Economic region	Area (km^{2})	Population		Est.
Code	Name	Capital / administrative centre^{[a]}	Flag	Coat of arms	Type	Titular nation	Head of subject	Federal district	Economic region	Area (km^{2})	Total	Density (km^{2})	Est.
80	Donetsk People's Republic^{[e]}^{[f]}	Donetsk			republic	—N/a	Denis Pushilin (UR/ODDR)		Central Black Earth	26,517^{[g]}	4,100,280^{[g]}	154.63^{[g]}	2022
81	Luhansk People's Republic^{[e]}^{[f]}	Luhansk			republic	—N/a	Leonid Pasechnik (UR/ML)		Central Black Earth	26,684^{[g]}	2,121,322^{[g]}	79.50^{[g]}	2022
82	Republic of Crimea^{[e]}	Simferopol			republic	—N/a	Sergey Aksyonov (UR)	Southern	North Caucasus	26,081	1,934,630	74.18	2014
84	Kherson Oblast^{[e]}^{[f]}	Henichesk (de facto); Kherson (claimed); (Largest city: Kherson)			oblast	—N/a	Vladimir Saldo (Ind.)		North Caucasus	28,461^{[g]}	1,016,707^{[g]}	35.72^{[g]}	2022
85	Zaporozhye Oblast^{[e]}^{[f]}	Melitopol (Largest city: Zaporizhzhia)			oblast	—N/a	Yevgeny Balitsky (UR)		North Caucasus	27,183^{[g]}	1,666,515^{[g]}	61.31^{[g]}	2022
92	Sevastopol^{[e]}				federal city	—N/a	Mikhail Razvozhayev (UR)	Southern	North Caucasus	864	547,820	634.05	2014

=== Notes ===
1. The largest city is also listed when it is different from the capital/administrative centre.
2. According to Article 13 of the Charter of Leningrad Oblast, the governing bodies of the oblast are located in Gatchina and in Saint Petersburg. However, Saint Petersburg is not officially the administrative centre of the oblast.
3. According to Article 24 of the Charter of Moscow Oblast, the governing bodies of the oblast are located in the city of Moscow and throughout the territory of Moscow Oblast. However, Moscow is not officially the administrative centre of the oblast.
4. In February 2000, the former code of 20 for the Chechen Republic was cancelled and replaced with code 95. License plate production was suspended due to the Chechen Wars, causing numerous issues, which in turn forced the region to use a new code.
5. Internationally recognized as part of Ukraine.
6. Claimed, but only partially controlled by Russia.
7. As Russia only partially controls the region, this is a claimed figure.

== Statistics of federal subjects ==
- List of federal subjects of Russia by GRP
- Armorial of Russia (Coat of arms of Russian federal subjects)
- List of federal subjects of Russia by incidence of substance abuse
- List of federal subjects of Russia by GDP per capita
- List of federal subjects of Russia by murder rate
- List of federal subjects of Russia by life expectancy
- List of federal subjects of Russia by population
- List of federal subjects of Russia by total fertility rate
- List of federal subjects of Russia by Human Development Index
- List of federal subjects of Russia by unemployment rate
- Regional parliaments of Russia
- List of current heads of federal subjects of Russia
- Forest cover by federal subject in Russia
- ISO 3166-2:RU

== Mergers, splits and internal territorial changes ==
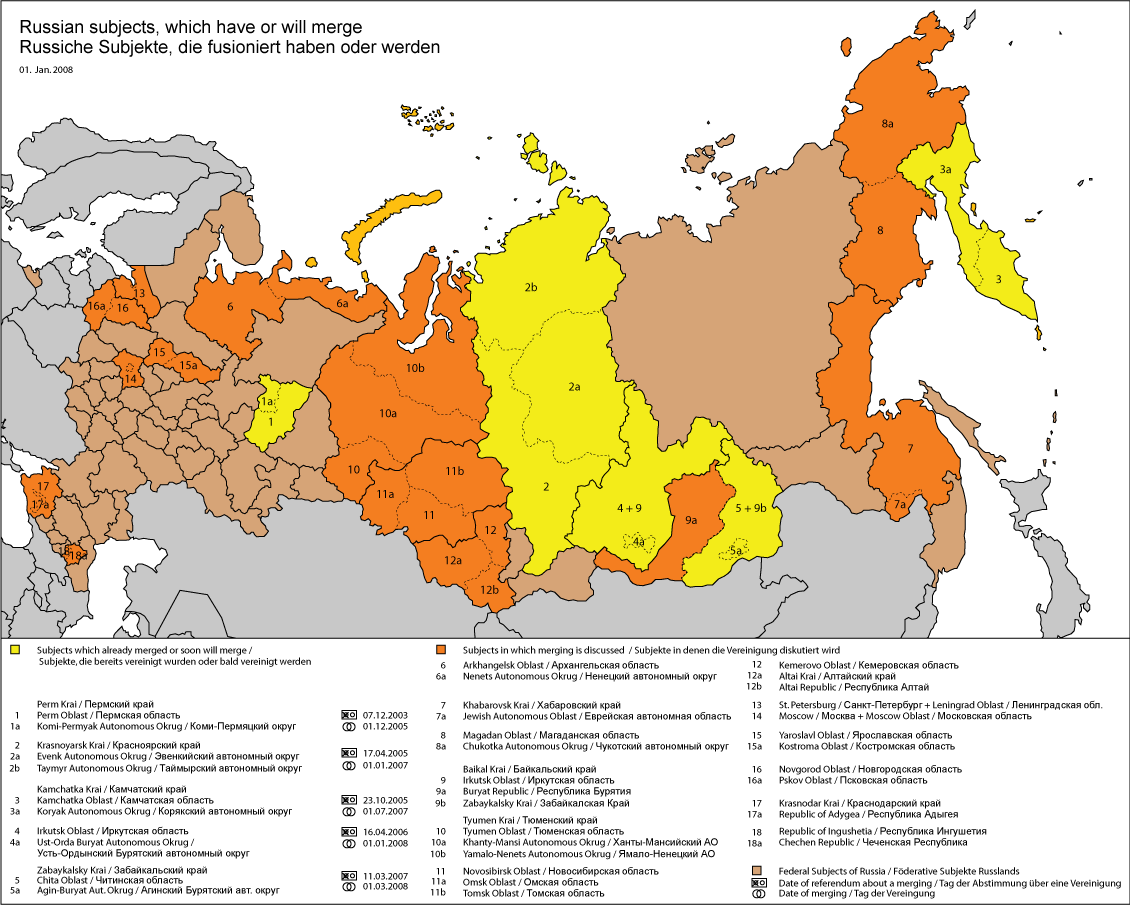
Map of the federal subjects of Russia highlighting those that merged in the first decade of the 21st century (in yellow), and those whose merger has been discussed in the same decade (in orange)

Starting in 2005, some of the federal subjects were merged into larger territories. In this process, six very sparsely populated subjects (comprising in total 0.3% of the population of Russia) were integrated into more populated subjects, with the hope that the economic development of those territories would benefit from the much larger means of their neighbours. The merging process was finished on 1 March 2008. No new mergers have been planned since March 2008. The six territories became "administrative-territorial regions with special status". They have large proportions of minorities, with Russians being a majority only in three of them. Four of those territories have a second official language in addition to Russian: Buryat (in two of the merged territories), Komi-Permian, Koryak. This is an exception: all the other official languages of Russia (other than Russian) are set by the Constitutions of its constituent Republics (Mordovia, Chechnya, Dagestan etc.). The status of the "administrative-territorial regions with special status" has been a subject of criticism because it does not appear in the Constitution of the Russian Federation.

Date of referendum	Date of merger	Original entities	Original codes	New code	Original entities	New entity
2003-12-07	2005-12-01	1, 1a	59 (1), 81 (1a)	90	Perm Oblast (1) + Komi-Permyak Autonomous Okrug (1a)	Perm Krai
2005-04-17	2007-01-01	2, 2a, 2b	24 (2), 88 (2a), 84 (2b)	24	Krasnoyarsk Krai (2) + Evenk Autonomous Okrug (2a) + Taymyr Autonomous Okrug (2b)	Krasnoyarsk Krai
2005-10-23	2007-07-01	3, 3a	41 (3), 82 (3a)	91	Kamchatka Oblast (3) + Koryak Autonomous Okrug (3a)	Kamchatka Krai
2006-04-16	2008-01-01	4, 4a	38 (4), 85 (4a)	38	Irkutsk Oblast (4) + Ust-Orda Buryat Autonomous Okrug (4a)	Irkutsk Oblast
2007-03-11	2008-03-01	5, 5a	75 (5), 80 (5a)	92	Chita Oblast (5) + Agin-Buryat Autonomous Okrug (5a)	Zabaykalsky Krai

In addition to those six territories that entirely ceased to be subjects of the Russian Federation and were downgraded to territories with special status, another three subjects have a status of subject but are simultaneously part of a more populated subject:

- Nenets Autonomous Okrug (2010 population of 42,090) has been a subject since 1993, but is also, according to its Constitution, part of Arkhangelsk Oblast
- Khanty-Mansi Autonomous Okrug obtained autonomy in 1977, but is also part of Tyumen Oblast
- Yamalo-Nenets Autonomous Okrug obtained the status of subject in 1992 (after obtaining autonomy in 1977), but is also part of Tyumen Oblast.

With an estimated population of 49,348 as of 2018, Chukotka is currently the least populated subject of Russia that is not part of a more populated subject. It was separated from Magadan Oblast in 1993. Chukotka is one of the richest subjects of Russia (with a gross regional product [GRP] per capita equivalent to that of Australia) and therefore does not fit in the pattern of merging a subject to benefit from the economic dynamism of the neighbour.

In 1992, Ingushetia separated from Chechnya to stay away from the growing violence in Chechnya. Those two Muslim republics, populated in vast majority (95%+) by closely related Vainakh people, speaking Vainakhish languages, remain the two poorest subjects of Russia, with the GRP per capita of Ingushetia being equivalent to that of Iraq. According to 2016 statistics, however, they are also the safest regions of Russia, and also have the lowest alcohol consumption, with alcohol poisoning at least 40 times lower than the federal average.

Until 1994, Sokolsky District, Nizhny Novgorod Oblast was part of Ivanovo Oblast.

In 2011–2012, the territory of Moscow increased by 140% (to 2,511 km^{2} (970 sq mi)) by acquiring part of Moscow Oblast.

On 13 May 2020, the governors of Arkhangelsk Oblast and Nenets Autonomous Okrug announced their plan to merge following the collapse of oil prices stemming from the COVID-19 pandemic. The process was scrapped on 2 July due to its unpopularity among the population.

== See also ==
- Subdivisions of Russia
- Federal districts of Russia
- Economic regions of Russia
- History of the administrative division of Russia
- Armorial of Russia
- Republics of the Soviet Union
- Flags of the Soviet Republics
- Flags of the federal subjects of Russia
- List of federal subjects of Russia by population
- List of heads of federal subjects of Russia
- Russian volunteer battalions
