= Parade of sovereignties =

Declarations of sovereignty by Soviet republics

The parade of sovereignties (Russian: Парад суверенитетов, romanized: Parad suverenitetov) was a series of declarations of sovereignty of various degrees by the republics of the Soviet Union and autonomous units within the republics (autonomous republics, autonomous oblasts and autonomous okrugs) from 1988 to 1991. The declarations stated the priority of the constituent republic power in its territory over the central power, which led to the War of Laws between the center and the republics. The process followed the loosened power grip of the Communist Party of the Soviet Union as a result of demokratizatsiya and perestroika policies under Mikhail Gorbachev. Despite the efforts of Gorbachev to preserve the union under a new treaty in the form of the Union of Sovereign States, many constituents soon declared their full independence. The process resulted in the dissolution of the Soviet Union.

The massive secessionist event has served as a testbench for various theories of secession.

== Union Republics ==
The first top-level Soviet republic to declare state sovereignty was the Estonian Soviet Socialist Republic on 16 November 1988. The other 14 Soviet republics would adopt similar declarations of state sovereignty within two years and one month of that, with the approval of Gorbachev’s government in Moscow. However, it would be the Lithuanian Soviet Socialist Republic that was the first to declare its full independence on 11 March 1990, after candidates endorsed by the opposition movement Sąjūdis had won an absolute majority of seats in the Supreme Soviet of Lithuania in the parliamentary elections of 24 February 1990. This went further than Gorbachev’s government had intended, and Moscow imposed an economic blockade on Lithuania to pressure it into revoking its declaration of independence.

The independence of the Baltic republics was recognized by the State Council of the USSR on September 6, 1991. The rest of the republics continued to formally remain part of the USSR until the adoption by the Council of the Republics of the Supreme Soviet of the USSR of a declaration on the termination of its existence on December 26, 1991.

Union republic	Sovereignty proclaimed	Renamed	Independence proclaimed	United Nations admission
Estonian SSR	16 November 1988	since 8 May 1990: Republic of Estonia	8 May 1990	17 September 1991
Lithuanian SSR	26 May 1989	since 11 March 1990: Republic of Lithuania	11 March 1990	17 September 1991
Latvian SSR	28 July 1989	since 4 May 1990: Republic of Latvia	4 May 1990	17 September 1991
Azerbaijan SSR	23 September 1989	since 5 February 1991: Republic of Azerbaijan	18 October 1991	2 March 1992
Georgian SSR	9 March 1990	since 14 November 1990: Republic of Georgia	9 April 1991	31 July 1992
Russian SFSR	12 June 1990	since 25 December 1991: Russian Federation	12 December 1991 (Note: Implicit.)	24 December 1991 (Note: As the successor to the Soviet Union itself.)
Uzbek SSR	20 June 1990	since 31 August 1991: Republic of Uzbekistan	1 September 1991	2 March 1992
Moldavian SSR	23 June 1990	since 23 May 1991: Republic of Moldova	27 August 1991	2 March 1992
Ukrainian SSR	16 July 1990	since 24 August 1991: Ukraine	24 August 1991	24 October 1945 (Note: Name change on 24 August 1991.)
Byelorussian SSR	27 July 1990	since 19 September 1991: Republic of Belarus	25 August 1991	24 October 1945 (Note: Name change on 19 September 1991.)
Turkmen SSR	22 August 1990	since 27 October 1991: Turkmenistan	27 October 1991	2 March 1992
Armenian SSR	23 August 1990	since 23 August 1990: Republic of Armenia	21 September 1991	2 March 1992
Tajik SSR	24 August 1990	since 31 August 1991: Republic of Tajikistan	9 September 1991	2 March 1992
Kazakh SSR	25 October 1990	since 10 December 1991: Republic of Kazakhstan	16 December 1991	2 March 1992
Kirghiz SSR	15 December 1990	since 5 February 1991: Republic of Kyrgyzstan	31 August 1991	2 March 1992

== Autonomous units ==
Map of the types of the subdivisions as of 1983, with autonomous republics shown in orange, autonomous oblasts in blue, and autonomous okrugs in pink.

The first lower-level subdivision to declare independence was the Nakhichevan Autonomous Soviet Socialist Republic on January 19, 1990, predating that of Lithuania by weeks.

Following the proposal of New Union Treaty by Gorbachev during the Communist Party Congress in July 1990, most of autonomous republics expressed the desire to be a party to the new treaty and declared sovereignty. The effort was ultimately futile due to the August Coup.

=== Russian SFSR ===
As most autonomous republics and oblasts self-declared promotion to Soviet Socialist Republics, Art. 71 and 72 of the Constitution of the RSFSR were amended on May 24, 1991 to recognize its autonomous republics as SSRs; it was further amended on July 3 to promote all its autonomous oblasts other than the Jewish Autonomous Oblast to SSRs.

All of them other than Tatarstan and the self-proclaimed Chechen Republic (Nokhchi-cho) in the defunct Checheno-Ingushetia agreed to sign the Treaty of Federation on 31 March 1992 and became republics of Russia. The self-proclaimed Yamalo-Nenets Republic gave up the claim and resumed the status of an autonomous okrug.

Autonomous unit	Sovereignty proclaimed	Reintegration	Federal subjects of Russia
North Ossetian ASSR	20 July 1990	31 March 1992	North Ossetia
Karelian ASSR	9 August 1990	31 March 1992	Karelia
Komi ASSR	29 August 1990	31 March 1992	Komi
Tatar ASSR	30 August 1990	15 February 1994	Tatarstan
Udmurt ASSR	20 September 1990	31 March 1992	Udmurtia
Yakut ASSR	27 September 1990	31 March 1992	Sakha
Buryat ASSR	8 October 1990	31 March 1992	Buryatia
Bashkir ASSR	11 October 1990	31 March 1992	Bashkortostan
Yamalo-Nenets Autonomous Okrug	16 October 1990	31 March 1992	Yamalo-Nenets Autonomous Okrug
Kalmyk ASSR	18 October 1990	31 March 1992	Kalmykia
Mari ASSR	22 October 1990	31 March 1992	Mari El
Chuvash ASSR	24 October 1990	31 March 1992	Chuvashia
Gorno-Altai Autonomous Oblast	25 October 1990	31 March 1992	Altai
Checheno-Ingush ASSR	27 November 1990	23 March 2003	Chechnya
Checheno-Ingush ASSR	27 November 1990	10 December 1992	Ingushetia
Tuvan ASSR	12 December 1990	31 March 1992	Tuva
Kabardino-Balkarian ASSR	30 January 1991	31 March 1992	Kabardino-Balkaria
Adyghe Autonomous Oblast (Note: Self-proclaimed Adyghe SSR since 5 October 1990.)	28 June 1991	31 March 1992	Adygea

While the Mordovian ASSR and Dagestan ASSR self-declared promotion to SSRs on 7 December 1990 and 13 May 1991 respectively, they did not proclaim state sovereignty.

On August 15, 1990, the Khakas Autonomous Oblast adopted a resolution to transform the region into an ASSR and submitted a corresponding petition to the Supreme Soviet of the RSFSR.

On November 30, 1990, the Karachay-Cherkess Autonomous Oblast self-declared promotion to an SSR. From 1990 to 1991, there were attempts to split the region on an ethnic basis as the congresses of representatives of local nationalities proclaimed the Karachay Republic, the Republic of Cherkessia, the Abazin Republic, and the Upper Kuban Cossack Republic. In March 1992, a referendum was held in which the majority of the population spoke out against the division. Karachay-Cherkessia signed the Treaty of Federation on 31 March 1992.

=== Other republics ===
All autonomous units outside the Russian SFSR other than Adjarian ASSR declared sovereignty at some point. While some were reintegrated into the post-Soviet republic they were in peacefully relatively soon after, most in the South Caucasus region turned into long-time breakaways states.

Autonomous unit	Republic	Sovereignty proclaimed	Reintegration	Post-Soviet entities
Nakhichevan ASSR	Azerbaijan SSR	19 January 1990 (Note: Independence from the Soviet Union.)	17 November 1990	Nakhchivan (Azerbaijan)
Abkhaz ASSR	Georgian SSR	25 August 1990	-	Abkhazia
South Ossetian AO	Georgian SSR	20 September 1990	-	South Ossetia
Karakalpak ASSR	Uzbek SSR	14 December 1990	9 January 1993	Karakalpakstan (Uzbekistan)
Nagorno-Karabakh AO	Azerbaijan SSR	2 September 1991	1 January 2024	Nagorno-Karabakh until 2024
Crimean ASSR	Ukrainian SSR	4 September 1991 (Note: As a part of Ukraine, which had declared independence from the Soviet Union.)	30 June 1992	Crimea (Ukraine)
Gorno-Badakhshan AO	Tajik SSR	10 April 1992 (Note: As Autonomous Republic of Badakhshan within Tajikistan after the dissolution of the Soviet Union.)	27 June 1997	Gorno-Badakhshan (Tajikistan)

== Other entities ==
Some regions inside Moldavian Soviet Socialist Republic proclaimed republics within the Soviet Union that were not recognized. They declared independence from the Moldavian SSR and became de facto independent states upon the dissolution of the Soviet Union.

Entity	Proclaimed	Sovereignty proclaimed	Reintegration	Post-Soviet entities
Gagauz Republic	12 November 1989 (Note: Gagauz ASSR before 19 August 1990.)	-	14 January 1995	Gagauzia (Moldova)
Pridnestrovian Moldavian SSR	2 September 1990	8 December 1990	-	Transnistria
