= Declaration of Sovereignty (Uzbekistan) =

The Declaration of Sovereignty (Note: (Russian: Декларация О Суверенитете)) of the Uzbek Soviet Socialist Republic was adopted at the second session of the Supreme Soviet on 20 June 1990, making Uzbekistan the first republic in Central Asia to formally assert autonomy from Moscow. The act declared that Uzbek legislation would take precedence over Soviet laws and placed both domestic and foreign policy under the republic’s jurisdiction. Uzbekistan became the eighth of fifteen Soviet republics to proclaim sovereignty, following Russia, the Baltic states, and the Transcaucasian republics, and the move was widely seen as a decisive step in reshaping the Soviet Union political order.

The aftermath of the declaration marked the beginning of Uzbekistan’s gradual break from Soviet control. Although the republic participated in the March 1991 Soviet Union referendum on preserving a renewed federation, the failed August coup in Moscow accelerated the drive toward independence. On 31 August 1991, president Islam Karimov proclaimed independence, which was later confirmed in a nationwide referendum held alongside the first presidential election in December of that year. These events, rooted in the 1990 declaration, paved the way for the adoption of a new constitution on 8 December 1992, formally establishing Uzbekistan as a sovereign republic.
