= War of Laws =

Conflicts between the central USSR government and SSR governments (1989–1991)

The War of Laws (Russian: Война законов, Voyna zakonov) was the series of conflicts between the central government of the Soviet Union and the governments of the Soviet republics during the so-called "parade of sovereignties" in the last years of the Soviet Union (1989–1991), which eventually contributed to the dissolution of the Soviet Union. When Soviet General Secretary Mikhail Gorbachev and the Communist Party of the Soviet Union decided to formally release their control of the republics, the individual governments began to reassert their own sovereignty and dominance in their respective areas. That included making their own laws separate from those of the Soviet central government and refusing to pay taxes. These events worsened the Soviet Union's economic disintegration and were a major factor in its 1991 collapse.

== Early conflicts ==
In 1989–1991 legislative gridlock developed between the Soviet government and the Soviet republics. Many laws were passed by the republics' governments which gave them jurisdiction over their own territory and were overturned by Moscow as unconstitutional. In response, the republics officially stated that Moscow's rulings were not relevant to the matter over which the original law had been passed. That led to a constant conflict over constitutional wording and whether the republics or Moscow were supreme.

The republics began to assert their sovereignty over their regions: the first was Estonia in 1988, and the 14 others had followed by 1990. Native languages were readopted, instead of Russian. That alienated some large cities made up of Russian citizens, which led to attempts to create or recreate even smaller republics. The new governments continued the war of laws by rejecting new laws passed by Moscow and by creating their own. While sometimes the laws passed by the republics were contradictory, they were largely almost identical to those being passed in Moscow and formed a system of what was termed "parallel power".

For instance, Tatarstan, with a plurality population of Muslim Tatars, declared itself an independent state with the right to self-determination in 1990 and claimed ownership of its massive oil reserves. It set itself free of Russian law and Russian taxes, as did many of Russia's 89 regions.

There was a lengthy war of laws between the Georgian SSR and the Central Soviet government due to the status of the South Ossetian Autonomous Oblast when the Oblast requested elevation to an Autonomous Soviet Socialist Republic on 10 November 1989. A legal solution could not be found, and the conflict spiraled into the South Ossetian War, one of the ongoing frozen conflicts.

== Dissolution of the Soviet Union ==
As the splits became more and more pronounced, the Soviet government began speaking of returning to the status quo by means that would not have been considered earlier. Gorbachev responded to this by putting marketization and constitutional amendments on hold in order to focus on reorganizing the Soviet Union to maintain its unity. The New Union Treaty was made to give more control to the republics over their own affairs, an attempt to keep them in the Union. However, the act was far too late, and no amount of publicizing made the republics change their minds from withdrawal.

The vacuum of power that had been created was filled with the arrival of Boris Yeltsin, who attempted to gain support for himself and denounced Gorbachev. The Kremlin and Gorbachev responded with a censure of Yeltsin and his remarks.

The anti-government feelings were influenced further by the August Coup, which involved the attempted overthrow of Gorbachev. It was put down, but the destabilization reduced Gorbachev's power drastically. Control of the situation moved toward the republics, and Lithuania, Latvia and Estonia were given independence. The 12 other republics settled on much less strict forms of Soviet governance.

The Soviet Union was declared to have ended officially with the signing of the Belavezha Accords on 8 December 1991 between Russia, Ukraine and Belarus. The result of the signing was the Commonwealth of Independent States, and Gorbachev resigned from the Soviet presidency later than month.

== Central Soviet and regional republican leaders during the War of Laws ==
Leader of the central Soviet government
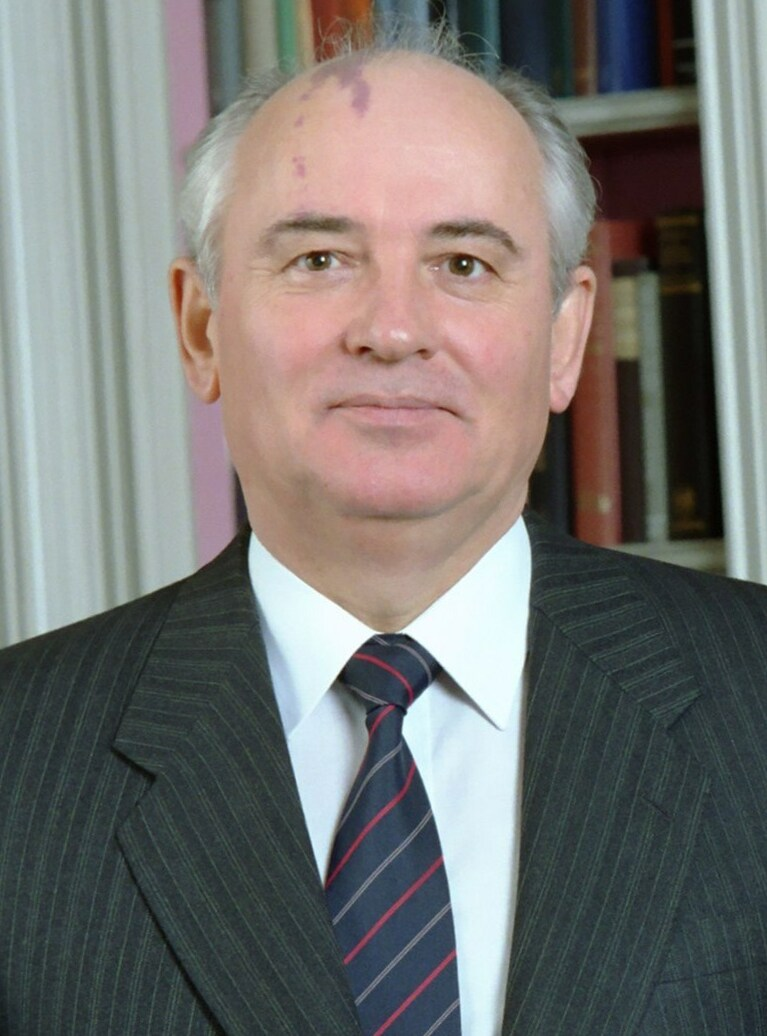
Mikhail Gorbachev (Communist Party of the Soviet Union) Chairman of the Supreme Soviet of the Soviet Union (1989–1990)
President of the Soviet Union (1990–1991)

Leaders of regional Soviet republics who opposed Gorbachev from democratic, radical reformist or nationalist positions
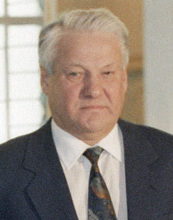
(Russian Soviet Federative Socialist Republic) / (Russian Soviet Federative Socialist Republic) Boris Yeltsin (Democratic Russia) Chairman of the Supreme Soviet of the Russian SFSR (1990–1991)
President of the Russian SFSR (1991)

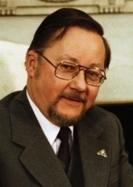
(Lithuanian Soviet Socialist Republic) Vytautas Landsbergis (Sąjūdis) Chairman of the Supreme Council – Reconstituent Seimas (1990–1992)

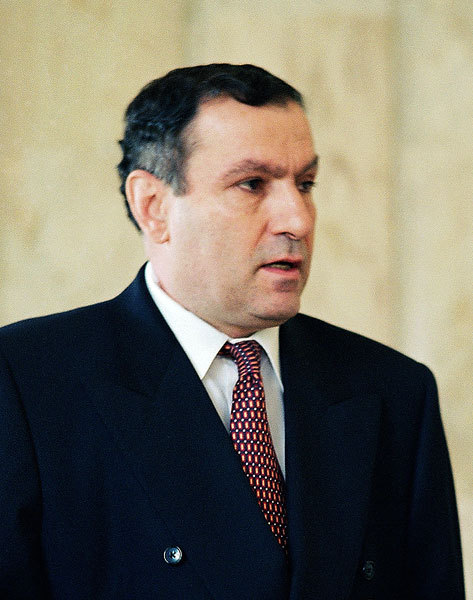
(Armenian Soviet Socialist Republic) / (Armenian Soviet Socialist Republic) Levon Ter-Petrosyan (Pan-Armenian National Movement) Chairman of the Supreme Council of Armenia (1990–1991)
President of Armenia (1990–1998)

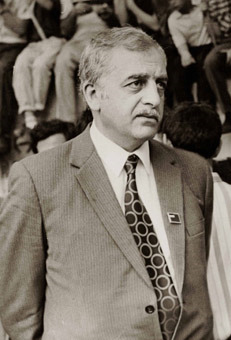
(Georgian Soviet Socialist Republic) / (Georgian Soviet Socialist Republic) Zviad Gamsakhurdia (Round Table—Free Georgia) Chairman of the Supreme Council of Georgia (1990–1991)
President of Georgia (1991–1992)

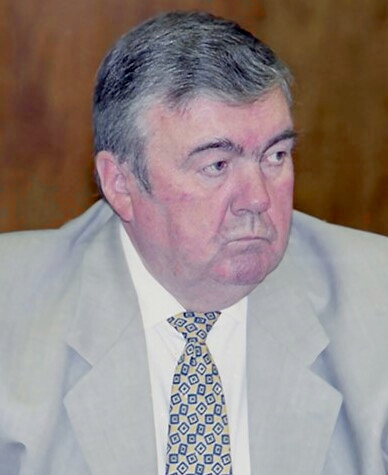
(Moldavian Soviet Socialist Republic) / (Moldavian Soviet Socialist Republic) Mircea Snegur (Independent) Chairman of the Supreme Soviet of the Moldovan SSR (1989–1990)
President of Moldova (1990–1997)

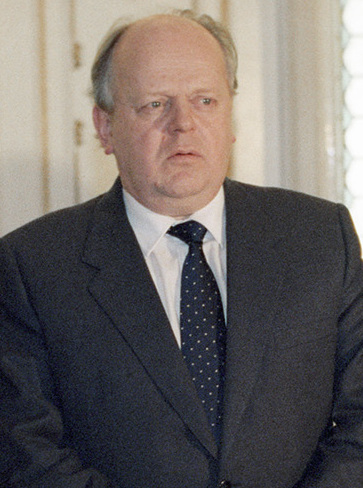
(Byelorussian Soviet Socialist Republic) / (Byelorussian Soviet Socialist Republic) Stanislav Shushkevich (Independent) Chairman of the Supreme Council of Belarus (1991–1994)

== Issues in new Russia ==
While Yeltsin's rise was timely and seemed to express a new future for Russia, he faced considerable opposition in implementing laws vital to the continuance of Russia. The members who had been Soviets were largely stripped of power and replaced with other Russian citizens, but many Soviets were able to switch over to a nationalist stance and retain their positions.

After the new government reorganized itself, Yeltsin found himself in a position that should have offered him the ability to change Russia as he saw fit, but it was undermined by the Russian Parliament. Another war of laws began between Yeltsin and parliament, a conflict that also trickled through the lower echelons of the government. Pressured to find a way to go around the Parliament, Yeltsin made major concessions to his subject regions with the signing of the Federal Treaty in an attempt to gain its favor in his legal battle. He even went further with the creation of the Russian Constitution, which gave more powers to the republics still affiliated with Russia.

== Russia's modern War of Laws ==
With Vladimir Putin's rise to presidency in 2000, a much more rigid, "unified" Russia was expected to form. While the constituent republics had obtained a large amount of autonomy and sovereignty after the Soviet collapse, their constitutions still considered them to be unified with Russia in one form or another. Putin's presidency led to the passing of several regulations pushing reintegration.

Tatarstan was the republic that led the way for regional autonomy, the main region pushing for the policy of "official asymmetry". That stance was imperiled by the creation of legislation known as "federal intervention" in which the Russian president can remove any leader of a republic and dissolve the republic's legislature if the region twice refuses to obey court decisions in Moscow.

In response, the courts were bombarded with cases in an attempt to change the law, but that led only to further disintegration of laws protecting the regions. Tatarstan was forced to reword its constitution to foster closer ties with the Russian government. The capital, Kazan, made those conciliatory moves but remained somewhat independent in some forms. However, nationalist movements sprouted among the people and the reintegration of Tatarstan became one filled with strife and conflict.
