= Krais of Russia =

Type of federal subject of Russia

Krais
- Also known as: Krays
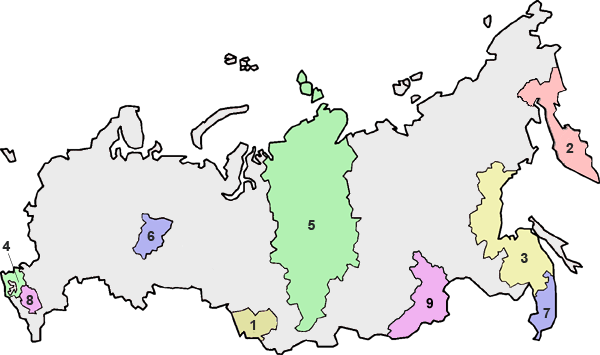
1. Altai Krai 2. Kamchatka Krai 3. Khabarovsk Krai 4. Krasnodar Krai 5. Krasnoyarsk Krai 6. Perm Krai 7. Primorsky Krai 8. Stavropol Krai 9. Zabaykalsky Krai
- Category: Federated state
- Location: Russian Federation
- Number: 9
- Populations: Smallest: Kamchatka Krai 322,079 Largest: Krasnodar Krai 5,404,300
- Areas: Smallest: Stavropol Krai 25,540 sq mi (66,160 km^{2}) Largest: Krasnoyarsk Krai 903,400 sq mi (2,339,700 km^{2})
- Government: Krai Government
- Subdivisions: Raion, urban-type settlements, Selsovet, Closed City

A krai (Russian: край, romanized: kray, IPA: [krai], lit. 'region, edge') is a type of federal subject of the Russian Federation. The country is divided into 83 federal subjects, of which nine are krais. Oblasts, another type of federal subject, are legally identical to krais and the difference between a political entity with the name "krai" or "oblast" is purely traditional; both are constituent entities equivalent in legal status in Russia with representation in the Federation Council. During the Soviet era, the autonomous oblasts could be subordinated to republics or krais, but not to oblasts.

== Etymology ==
The term has multiple meanings in the Russian language. Outside of political terminology, krai and oblast have a very similar general meaning ("region" or "area" in English) and can often be used interchangeably. The Russian term for a homeland is also "Krai", as seen in "Rodnoi Krai" (homeland) or "Krayevedenie" (Regional studies). When a distinction is desirable, "krai" is sometimes translated into English as "territory", (closer to "edge" in literal translation, what is more related with the March meaning as a "borderland") while "oblast" can variously be translated to "province" or "region", but both of these translations are also reasonable interpretations of "krai". The term is highly politicized, particularly since Ukraine has the term in its name, in the context of controlling Ukrainian territory by justifying it as the outskirts of a bigger nation.

The term krai or kray is derived from the Russian word for an edge, and can be translated into English as 'frontier' or 'territory'.

Since the 19th century, in the context of administrative division, the term has been used in relation to territories that were annexed or where a non-Russophone population is dominant.

== Overview ==
Each krai features a state government holding authority over a defined geographic territory, with a state legislature, the Legislative Assembly, that is democratically elected. The Governor is the highest executive position of the state government in a Krai, and is elected by people. Krais can be divided into raions (districts), cities/towns of krai significance, and okrugs. Krais previously featured autonomous okrugs until the formation of Zabaykalsky Krai on March 1, 2008, when the last remaining autonomous okrug of a krai was abolished.

The largest krai by geographic size is Krasnoyarsk Krai at 2,339,700 square kilometers (903,400 sq mi) and the smallest is Stavropol Krai at 66,500 square kilometers (25,700 sq mi). The most populous krai is Krasnodar Krai at 5,404,300 persons (2010 Census) and the least populous is Kamchatka Krai at 322,079 persons (2010).

Historically, krais were massive first-level administrative divisions in the Russian Empire, divided into large guberniyas (governorates). Following the numerous administration reforms during the Soviet era, the guberniyas were abolished and krais were reshaped into smaller, more numerous divisions. Eventually, krais and oblasts became almost totally equal as the top-level administrative division of the Soviet Socialist Republics (SSRs), the constituent political entities of the Soviet Union, with the only difference being that autonomous oblasts could be subordinated to krais but not to oblasts. The krais were unique to the Russian SFSR, and held very little autonomy or power, but when the Soviet Union dissolved into sovereign states along the lines of the SSRs, they became first-level administrative divisions of the Russian Federation and received more devolved power.

== List ==
Below is a list of the krais of Russia, listed in alphabetical order:

- Altai Krai
- Kamchatka Krai
- Khabarovsk Krai
- Krasnodar Krai
- Krasnoyarsk Krai
- Perm Krai
- Primorsky Krai
- Stavropol Krai
- Zabaykalsky Krai

== See also ==
- Krais of the Russian Empire
- Krajina
- Oblasts of Russia
- Republics of Russia
- Autonomous okrugs of Russia
- Federal cities of Russia
- Jewish Autonomous Oblast
