= Titular nation =

Dominant eponymous ethnic group of a state

In Soviet and post-Soviet studies, a titular nation is the single dominant ethnic group of a federated state, after which the state is typically named. It is sometimes applied to other multiethnic states.

In the Soviet Union, these were autonomous entities within the union: Soviet republics, autonomous republics, autonomous regions, and so on, such as Byelorussian SSR for Belarusians.

For an ethnos to be a Soviet titular nation, it had to satisfy certain criteria in terms of the amount of population and compactness of its settlement. The language of a titular nation was declared an additional (after Russian) official language of the corresponding administrative unit.

== China ==
The People's Republic of China government has adopted some of the principles behind this Soviet concept in its ethnic minority policy—see Autonomous administrative divisions of China.

== Yugoslavia ==
The federal republics of Socialist Yugoslavia were perceived as nation-states of the constitutional peoples. After the breakup of Yugoslavia, only Bosnia and Herzegovina was not defined in its constitution as a nation-state of its titular nation.

== See also ==
- National delimitation in the Soviet Union
- Nation state
- Princely state
- Panethnicity
- Pan-nationalism
