= Republics of Russia =

Constituent units of the Russian Federation

Republics
- Map of the de jure republics within Russia
- Category: Federated state
- Location: Russian Federation
- Number: 21 (Note: 21 republics within the internationally recognized borders of Russia.)
- Populations: Smallest: Altai, 206,195; Largest: Bashkortostan, 4,072,102
- Areas: Smallest: Ingushetia, 3,123 km^{2} (1,206 sq mi); Largest: Sakha, 3,083,523 km^{2} (1,190,555 sq mi)
- Government: Republican government
- Subdivisions: Districts, cities and towns of republic significance

The republics are one type of federal subject of the Russian Federation. Twenty-one republics are internationally recognized as part of Russia; another is under its de facto control. (Note: The Republic of Crimea was annexed by Russia in 2014; the Russian government declared it had annexed the Donetsk People's Republic and the Luhansk People's Republic in 2022. The United Nations recognizes all three regions as part of Ukraine.) The original republics were created as nation states for ethnic minorities. The indigenous ethnicity that gives its name to the republic is called the titular nationality. However, due to centuries of Russian migration, a titular nationality may not be a majority of its republic's population. By 2017, the autonomous status of all republics was formally abolished, making the republics politically equivalent to the other federal subjects of Russia.

Formed in the early 20th century by Vladimir Lenin and the Bolsheviks after the collapse of the Russian Empire in 1917, republics were intended to be nominally independent regions of Soviet Russia with the right to self-determination. Lenin's conciliatory stance towards Russia's minorities made them allies in the Russian Civil War and with the creation of the Soviet Union in 1922 the regions became autonomous republics, albeit subordinate to a union republic. While officially autonomous, the autonomies of these administrative units varied throughout the history of the Soviet Union but largely remained under the control of the central government. The 1980s saw an increase in the demand of autonomy as the Soviet Union began large scale reforms of its centralized system. In 1990, most of the autonomous republics declared their sovereignty. The Soviet Union collapsed in 1991 and Russia became independent. The current republics were established with the signing of the Federation Treaty in 1992, which gave them substantial rights and autonomy.

Russia is an asymmetrical federation in that republics have their own constitutions, official languages, and national anthems, but other subjects do not. The republics also originally had more powers devolved to them, though actual power varied between republics, depending largely upon their economic importance. Through the signing of bilateral treaties with the federal government, republics gained extensive authority over their economies, internal policies, and even foreign relations in the 1990s. However, after the turn of the century, Vladimir Putin's centralization reforms steadily eradicated the autonomy of the republics with the exception of Chechnya. The bilateral agreements were abolished and in practice all power now rests with the federal government. Since the termination of the final bilateral treaty in 2017, some commentators consider Russia to no longer be a federation.

In 2014, Russia invaded and annexed Crimea from Ukraine, incorporating the territory as the Republic of Crimea. However, it remains internationally recognized as part of Ukraine. During the 2022 Russian invasion of Ukraine, Russia declared the annexation of four partially-occupied Ukrainian provinces (oblasts), including the territory that had been under the control of the break-away Donetsk and Luhansk republics since 2014, and claimed the entirety of Donetsk and Luhansk provinces as Russian republics. These also remain internationally recognized as part of Ukraine.

== History ==
The republics were established in early Soviet Russia after the collapse of the Russian Empire. On 15 November 1917, Vladimir Lenin issued the Declaration of the Rights of the Peoples of Russia, giving Russia's minorities the right to self-determination. This declaration, however, was never truly meant to grant minorities the right to independence and was only used to garner support among minority groups for the fledgling Soviet state in the ensuing Russian Civil War. Attempts to create independent states using Lenin's declaration were suppressed throughout the civil war by the Bolsheviks. When the Soviet Union was formally created on 30 December 1922, the minorities of the country were relegated to Autonomous Soviet Socialist Republics (ASSR), which had less power than the union republics and were subordinate to them. In the aftermath of the civil war the Bolsheviks began a process of delimitation in order to draw the borders of the country. Through Joseph Stalin's theory on nationality, borders were drawn to create national homelands for various recognized ethnic groups. Early republics like the Kazakh ASSR and the Turkestan ASSR in Central Asia were dissolved and split up to create new union republics. With delimitation came the policy of indigenization which encouraged the de-Russification of the country and promotion of minority languages and culture. This policy also affected ethnic Russians and was particularly enforced in ASSRs where indigenous people were already a minority in their own homeland, like the Buryat ASSR. Language and culture flourished and ultimately institutionalized ethnicity in the state apparatus of the country. Despite this, the Bolsheviks worked to isolate the country's new republics by surrounding them within Russian territory for fear of them seeking independence. In 1925 the Bashkir ASSR lost its border with the future Kazakh SSR with the creation of the so-called "Orenburg corridor", thereby enclaving the entire Volga region. The Komi-Zyryan Autonomous Oblast lost access to the Barents Sea and became an enclave on 15 July 1929 prior to being upgraded to the Komi ASSR in 1936.

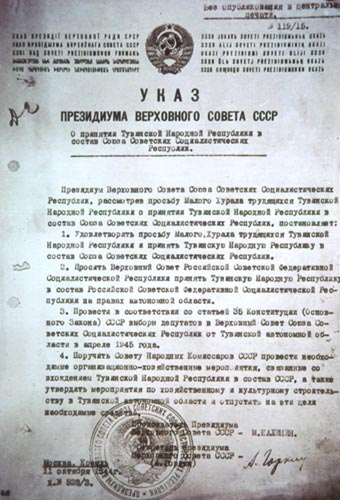
Decree of the Presidium of the Supreme Soviet on the incorporation of Tuva into the Soviet Union as an autonomous oblast, 11 October 1944. Tuva would not become an ASSR until 1961.

By the 1930s, the mood shifted as the Soviet Union under Joseph Stalin stopped enforcing indigenization and began purging non-Russians from government and intelligentsia. Thus, a period of Russification set in. Russian became mandatory in all areas of non-Russian ethnicity and the Cyrillic script became compulsory for all languages of the Soviet Union. The constitution stated that the ASSRs had power to enforce their own policies within their territory, but in practice the ASSRs and their titular nationalities were some of the most affected by Stalin's purges and were strictly controlled by Moscow. From 1937, the "bourgeois nationalists" became the "enemy of the Russian people" and indigenization was abolished. On 22 June 1941, Germany invaded the Soviet Union, forcing it in to the Second World War, and advanced deep in to Russian territory. In response, Stalin abolished the Volga German ASSR on 7 September 1941 and exiled the Volga Germans to Central Asia and Siberia. When the Soviets gained the upper hand and began recapturing territory in 1943, many minorities of the country began to be seen as German collaborators by Stalin and were accused of treason, particularly in southern Russia. Between 1943 and 1945, ethnic Balkars, Chechens, Crimean Tatars, Ingush, and Kalmyks were deported en masse from the region to remote parts of the country. Immediately after the deportations the Soviet government passed decrees that liquidated the Kalmyk ASSR on 27 December 1943, the Crimean ASSR on 23 February 1944, the Checheno-Ingush ASSR on 7 March 1944, and renamed the Kabardino-Balkar ASSR the Kabardian ASSR on 8 April 1944. After Stalin's death on 5 March 1953, the new government of Nikita Khrushchev sought to undo his controversial legacy. During his Secret speech on 25 February 1956 Khrushchev rehabilitated Russia's minorities. The Kabardino-Balkar ASSR and the Checheno-Ingush ASSR were restored on 9 January 1957 while the Kalmyk ASSR was restored on 29 July 1958. The government, however, refused to restore the Volga German ASSR and the Crimean ASSR, the latter of which was transferred to the Ukrainian SSR on 19 February 1954.

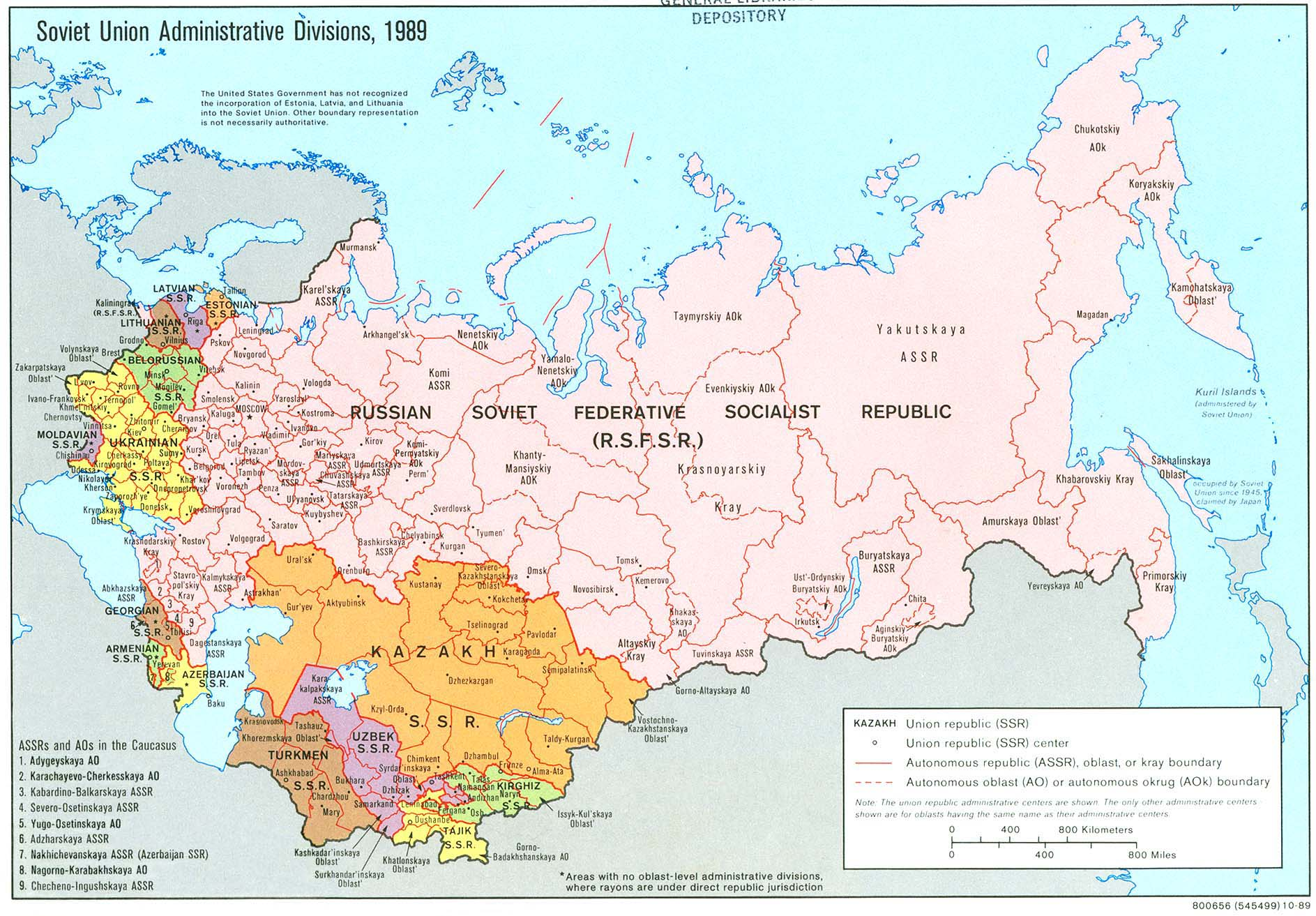
Republics of the Soviet Union in 1954–1991

The autonomies of the ASSRs varied greatly throughout the history of the Soviet Union but Russification would nevertheless continue unabated and internal Russian migration to the ASSRs would result in various indigenous people becoming minorities in their own republics. At the same time, the number of ASSRs grew; the Karelian ASSR was formed on 6 July 1956 after being a union republic from 1940 while the partially recognized state of Tuva was annexed by the Soviets on 11 October 1944 and became the Tuvan ASSR on 10 October 1961. By the 1980s General Secretary Mikhail Gorbachev's introduction of glasnost began a period of revitalization of minority culture in the ASSRs. From 1989, Gorbachev's Soviet Union and the Russian SFSR, led by Boris Yeltsin, were locked in a power struggle. Yeltsin sought support from the ASSRs by promising more devolved powers and to build a federation "from the ground up". On 12 June 1990, the Russian SFSR issued a Declaration of State Sovereignty, proclaiming Russia a sovereign state whose laws take priority over Soviet ones. The following month Yeltsin told the ASSRs to "take as much sovereignty as you can swallow" during a speech in Kazan, Tatar ASSR. These events prompted the ASSRs to assert themselves against a now weakened Soviet Union. Throughout 1990 and 1991, most of the ASSRs followed Russia's lead and issued "declarations of sovereignty", elevating their statuses to that of union republics within a federal Russia. The Dagestan ASSR and Mordovian ASSR were the only republics that did not proclaim sovereignty.

In the final year of the Soviet Union, negotiations were underway for a new treaty to restructure the country in to a loose confederation. Gorbachev invited the ASSRs to be participants in the drafting of the treaty, thereby recognizing them as equal to the union republics. However, a coup attempt in August 1991 derailed the negotiations and the union republics began to declare their independence throughout the year. The Soviet Union collapsed on 26 December 1991 and the position of the ASSRs became uncertain. By law, the ASSRs did not have the right to secede from the Soviet Union like the union republics did but the question of independence from Russia nevertheless became a topic of discussion in some of the ASSRs. The declarations of sovereignty adopted by the ASSRs were divided on the topic of secession. Some advocated the integrity of the Russian Federation, others were muted on the subject, while others like the Komi ASSR, Mari ASSR, and Tuvan ASSR reserved the right to self-determination. Yeltsin was an avid supporter of national sovereignty and recognized the independence of the union republics in what was called a "parade of sovereignties". In regards to the ASSRs, however, Yeltsin did not support secession and tried to prevent them from declaring independence. The Checheno-Ingush ASSR, led by Dzhokhar Dudayev, unilaterally declared independence on 1 November 1991 and Yeltsin would attempt to retake it on 11 December 1994, beginning the First Chechen War. When the Tatar ASSR held a referendum on whether to declare independence on 21 March 1992, he had the ballot declared illegal by the Constitutional Court.

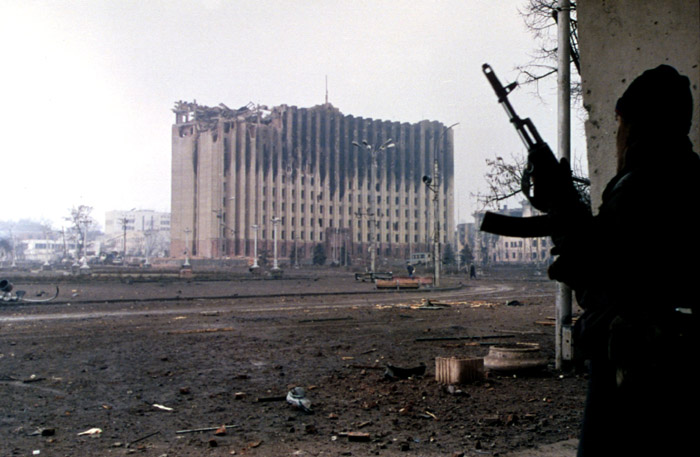
A Chechen fighter near the burned-out presidential palace during the battle of Grozny, January 1995. The building became a symbol of resistance for the supporters of the Chechen Republic of Ichkeria.

On 31 March 1992, every subject of Russia except the Tatar ASSR and the de facto state of Chechnya signed the Treaty of Federation with the government of Russia, solidifying its federal structure and Boris Yeltsin became the country's first president. The ASSRs were dissolved and became the modern day republics. The number of republics increased dramatically as the autonomous oblasts of Adygea, Gorno-Altai, Khakassia, and Karachay-Cherkessia were elevated to full republics, while the Ingush portion of the Checheno-Ingush ASSR refused to be part of the breakaway state and rejoined Russia as the Republic of Ingushetia on 4 June 1992. The Republic of Tatarstan demanded its own agreement to preserve its autonomy within the Russian Federation and on 15 February 1994, Moscow and Kazan signed a power-sharing deal, in which the latter was granted a high degree of autonomy. 45 other regions, including the other republics, would go on to sign autonomy agreements with the federal center. By the mid 1990s, the overly complex structure of the various bilateral agreements between regional governments and Moscow sparked a call for reform. The constitution of Russia was the supreme law of the country, but in practice, the power-sharing agreements superseded it while the poor oversight of regional affairs left the republics to be governed by authoritarian leaders who ruled for personal benefit. Meanwhile, the war in Chechnya entered a stalemate as Russian forces were unable to wrest control of the republic despite capturing the capital Grozny on 8 February 1995 and killing Dudayev months later in an airstrike. Faced with a demoralized army and universal public opposition to the war, Yeltsin was forced to sign the Khasavyurt Accord with Chechnya on 30 August 1996 and eventually withdrew troops. A year later Chechnya and Russia signed the Moscow Peace Treaty, ending Russia's attempts to retake the republic. As the decade drew to a close, the fallout from the failed Chechen war and the subsequent financial crisis in 1998 resulted in Yeltsin resigning on 31 December 1999.

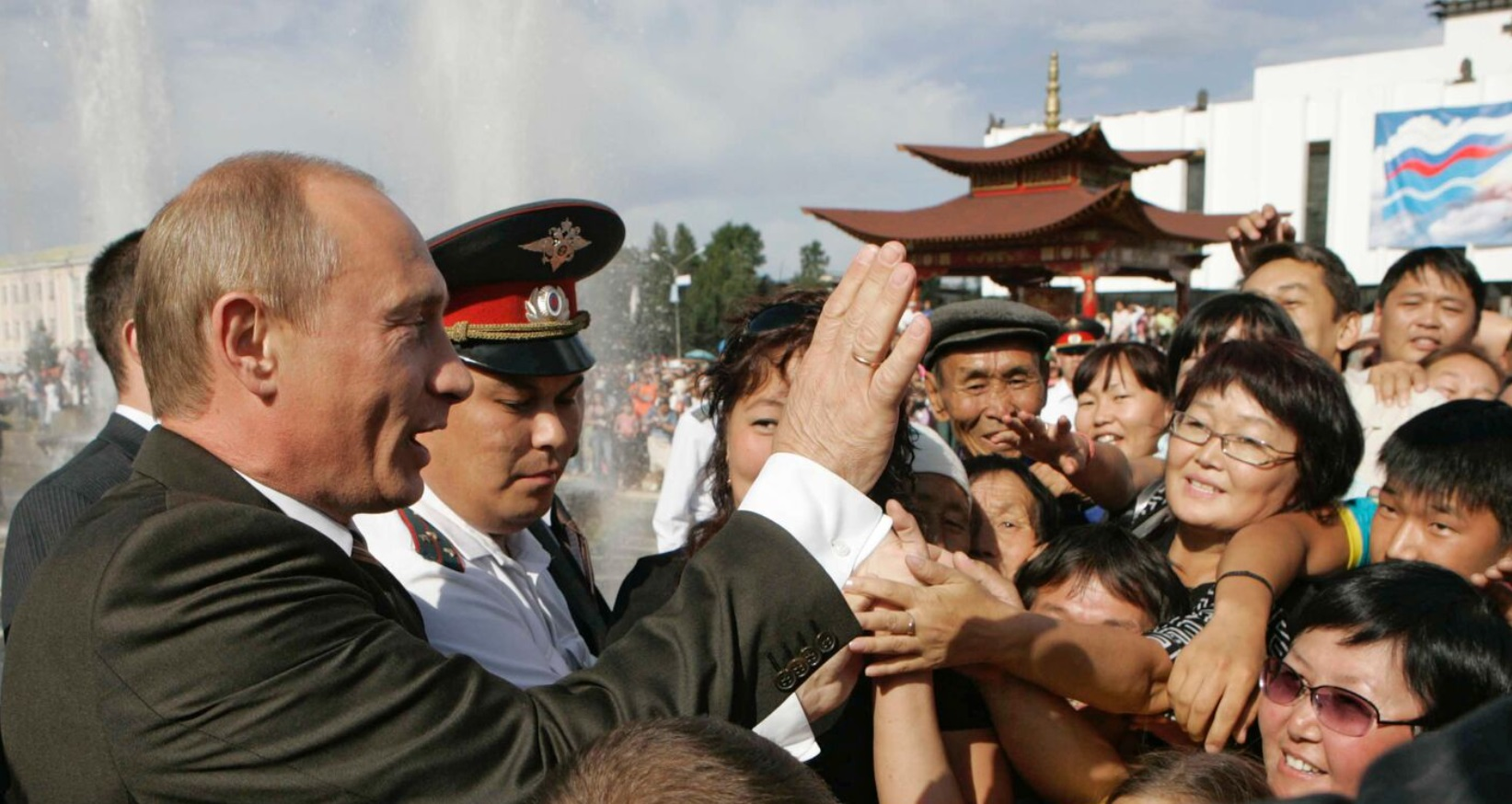
Vladimir Putin with local people in the Siberian republic of Tuva, 2007

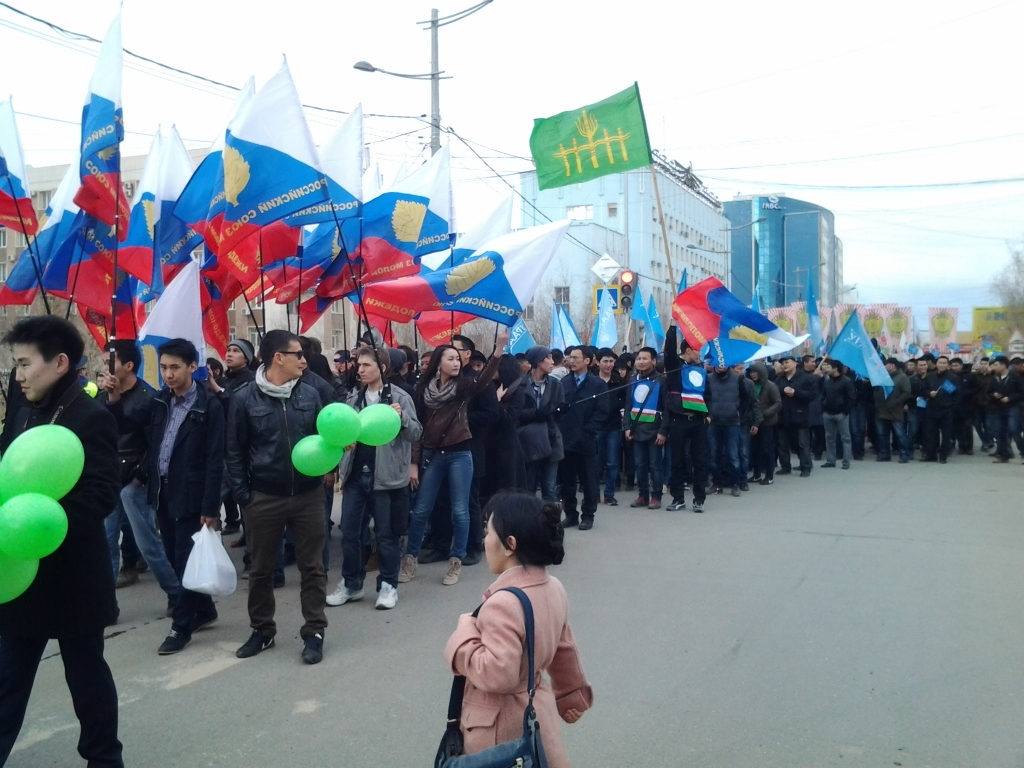
Statehood Day celebrations in Yakutsk, the capital of the Republic of Sakha, 2013

Yeltsin declared Vladimir Putin as interim president and his successor. Despite preserving the republic's de facto independence following the war, Chechnya's new president Aslan Maskhadov proved incapable of fixing the republic's devastated economy and maintaining order as the territory became increasingly lawless and a breeding ground for Islamic fundamentalism. Using this lawlessness extremists invaded neighboring Dagestan and bombed various apartment blocks in Russia, resulted in Putin sending troops into Chechnya again on 1 October 1999. Chechen resistance quickly fell apart in the face of a federal blitzkrieg and indiscriminate bombing campaign as troops captured Grozny on 6 February 2000 and pushed rebels in to the mountains. Moscow imposed direct rule on Chechnya on 9 June 2000 and the territory was officially reintegrated in to the Russian Federation as the Chechen Republic on 24 March 2003.

Putin would participate in the 26 March 2000 election on the promise of completely restructuring the federal system and restoring the authority of the central government. The power-sharing agreements began to gradually expire or be terminated and after 2003 only Tatarstan and Bashkortostan continued to negotiate on their treaties' extensions. Bashkortostan's power-sharing treaty expired on 7 July 2005, leaving Tatarstan as the sole republic to maintain its autonomy, which was renewed on 11 July 2007. After an attack by Chechen separatists at a school in Beslan, North Ossetia, Putin abolished direct elections for governors and assumed the power to personally appoint and dismiss them. Throughout the decade, influential regional leaders like Mintimer Shaimiev of Tatarstan and Murtaza Rakhimov of Bashkortostan, who were adamant on extending their bilateral agreements with Moscow, were dismissed, removing the last vestiges of regional autonomy from the 1990s. On 24 July 2017, Tatarstan's power-sharing agreement with Moscow expired, making it the last republic to lose its special status. After the agreement's termination, some commentators expressed the view that Russia ceased to be a federation. In 2022, Russia's ethnic republics suffered heavy losses in the invasion of Ukraine.

== Constitutional status ==
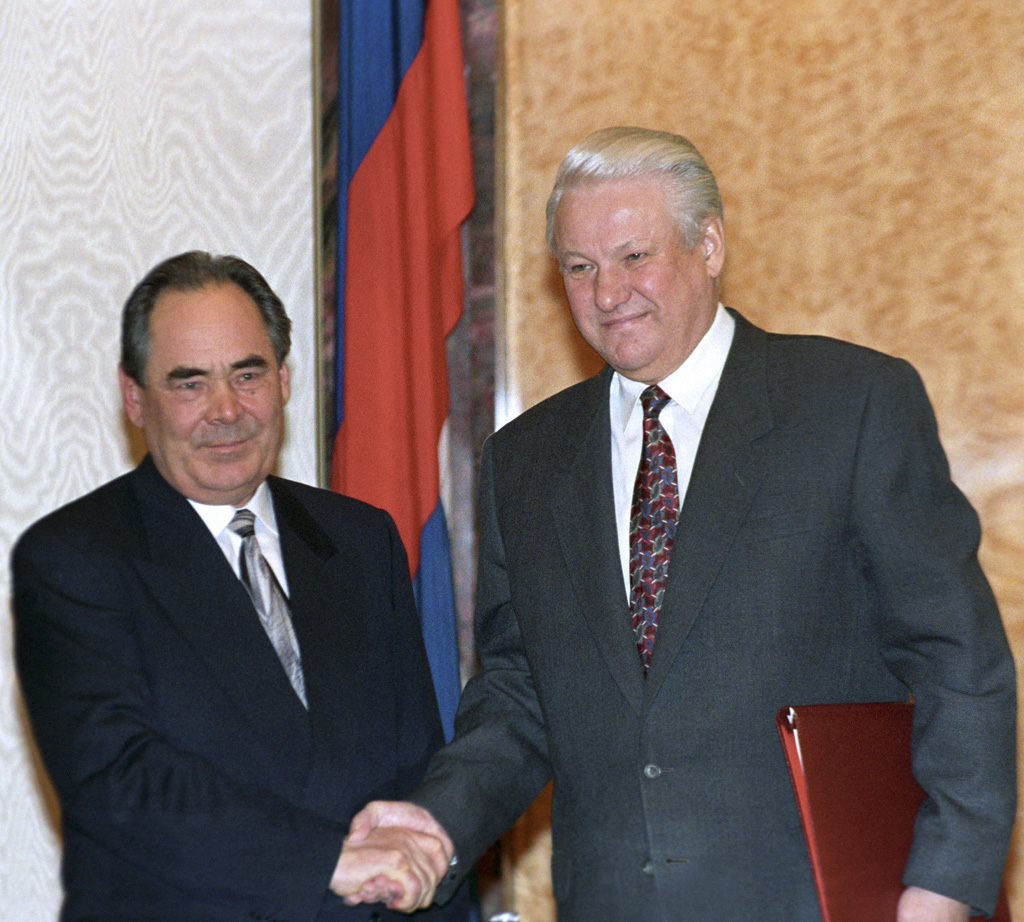
Russian president Boris Yeltsin and Tatarstan president Mintimer Shaimiev shaking hands after signing an agreement to grant Tatarstan devolved powers in 1994. During the 1990s the republics had significant autonomy.

Republics differ from other federal subjects in that they have the right to establish their own official language, have their own constitution, and have a national anthem. Other federal subjects, such as krais and oblasts, are not explicitly given this right. During Boris Yeltsin's presidency, the republics were the first subjects to be granted extensive power from the federal government, and were often given preferential treatment over other subjects, which has led to Russia being characterized as an "asymmetrical federation". The Treaty of Federation signed on 31 March 1992 stipulated that the republics were "sovereign states" that had expanded rights over natural resources, external trade, and internal budgets. The signing of bilateral treaties with the republics would grant them additional powers, however, the amount of autonomy given differed by republic and was mainly based on their economic wealth rather than ethnic composition. Sakha, for example, was granted more control over its resources, being able to keep most of its revenue and sell and receive its profits independently due to its vast diamond deposits. North Ossetia on the other hand, a poorer republic, was mainly granted more control over defense and internal security due to its location in the restive North Caucasus. Tatarstan and Bashkortostan had the authority to establish their own foreign relations and conduct agreements with foreign governments. This has led to criticism from oblasts and krais. After the 1993 Russian constitutional crisis, the current constitution was adopted but the republics were no longer classified as "sovereign states" and all subjects of the federation were declared equal, though maintaining the validity of the bilateral agreements.

In theory, the constitution of Russia was the ultimate authority over the republics, but the power-sharing treaties held greater weight in practice. Republics often created their own laws which contradicted the constitution. Yeltsin, however, made little effort to rein in renegade laws, preferring to turn a blind eye to violations in exchange for political loyalty. Vladimir Putin's election on 26 March 2000 began a period of extensive reforms to centralize authority with the federal government and bring all laws in line with the constitution. His first act as president was the creation of federal districts on 18 May 2000, which were tasked with exerting federal control over the country's subjects. Putin later established the so-called "Kozak Commission" in June 2001 to examine the division of powers between the government and regions. The Commission's recommendations focused mainly on minimizing the basis of regional autonomy and transferring lucrative powers meant for the republics to the federal government. Centralization of power would continue as the republics gradually lost more and more autonomy to the federal government, leading the European Parliament to conclude that Russia functions as a unitary state despite officially being a federation. On 29 December 2010, President Dmitry Medvedev signed a law banning the leaders of the republics from holding the title of 'president'. Tatarstan, however, resisted attempts to abolish its presidential post and remained the only republic to maintain the title. Putin subsequently signed a law forcing Tatarstan to abolish its title by June 2022. On 19 June 2018, a bill was passed that elevated the status of the Russian language at the expense of other official languages in the republics. The bill authorized the abolition of mandatory minority language classes in schools and for voluntary teaching to be reduced to two hours a week.

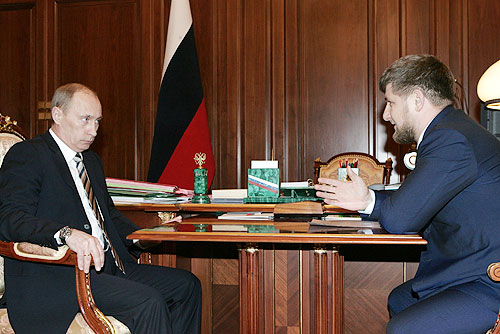
Russian president Vladimir Putin and Chechnya's leader Ramzan Kadyrov, 2008

Chechnya is the sole exception to Putin's centralization efforts. With the republic's reentry into Russia after the Second Chechen War, Chechnya was given broad autonomy in exchange for remaining within the country. At the end of the war, Putin bought the loyalty of local elites and granted Chechnya the right to manage its own affairs in dealing with separatists and governing itself outside of Russian control in a process called "Chechenization". With the appointment of Ramzan Kadyrov by Putin to lead the republic in 2007, the independence of Chechnya has grown significantly. The Russian government gives Chechnya generous subsidies in exchange for loyalty and maintaining security in the region. Observers have noted Putin's reluctance or inability to exert control over Kadyrov's rule for fear it could trigger another conflict. Chechnya under Kadyrov operates outside of Russian law, has its own independent security force, and conducts its own de facto foreign policy. This has led to Chechnya being characterized as a "state within a state".

There are secessionist movements in most republics, but these are generally not very strong. The constitution makes no mention on whether a republic can legally secede from the Russian Federation. However, the Constitutional Court of Russia ruled after the unilateral secession of Chechnya in 1991 that the republics do not have the right to secede and are inalienable parts of the country. Despite this, some republican constitutions in the 1990s had articles giving them the right to become independent. This included Tuva, whose constitution had an article explicitly giving it the right to secede. However, following Putin's centralization reforms in the early 2000s, these articles were subsequently dropped. The Kabardino-Balkar Republic, for example, adopted a new constitution in 2001 which prevents the republic from existing independently of the Russian Federation. After Russia's annexation of Crimea, the State Duma adopted a law making it illegal to advocate for the secession of any region on 5 July 2014.

== Status of southeast Ukraine ==
Regions of Ukraine annexed by Russia, with a red line marking the area of actual control by Russia on 30 September 2022.

On 18 March 2014, Russia annexed the Autonomous Republic of Crimea of Ukraine after a referendum. The peninsula subsequently became the Republic of Crimea, the 22nd republic of Russia. However, Ukraine and most of the international community do not recognize Crimea's annexation and the United Nations General Assembly Resolution 68/262 declared the referendum to be invalid.

On 24 February 2022, Russia invaded Ukraine and conquered large swaths of southern and eastern Ukraine. As early as March leaders in both the Luhansk People's Republic and Donetsk People's Republic expressed their wish to join Russia, originally once Russia captured all their claimed territory. However, after sudden Ukrainian gains in the east in September 2022, the republics organised a series of referendums on joining Russia, in which an overwhelming majority reportedly supported annexation. On 30 September 2022, Putin formally announced the annexation of the two republics and also of two Ukrainian oblasts of Kherson and Zaporizhzhia. The referendums were condemned internationally – the European Union and G7 rejected them as illegal while the United Nations Secretary-General António Guterres condemned the annexations as a violation of the UN Charter.

== Republics ==
- For the individual flags of the republics, see Flags of the federal subjects of Russia.

Name	Map	Domestic names	Capital	Titular population & change 2010–2021 (Note: Percent of population belonging to a titular ethnic group according to the 2021 Russian Census and change from the 2010 Russian Census.)	Russian population & change 2010–2021	Population (2021)	Area
Republic of Adygea	Map showing Adygea in Russia	Russian: Республика Адыгея (Respublika Adygeya); Adyghe: Адыгэ Республик (Adıgə Respublik)	Maykop Russian: Майкоп; Adyghe: Мыекъуапэ (Mıequapə)	Circassians (25.7%) ▼0.1%	64.4% ▲0.8%	496,934	7,792 km^{2} (3,009 sq mi)
Altai Republic	Map showing Altai in Russia	Russian: Республика Алтай (Respublika Altay); Altay: Алтай Республика (Altay Respublika); Kazakh: Алтай Республикасы (Altai Respublikasy)	Gorno-Altaysk Russian: Горно-Алтайск; Altay: Улалу (Ulalu); Kazakh: Горно-Алтайск (Gorno-Altaisk)	Altai (37.0%) ▲2.5%	53.7% ▼2.9%	210,924	92,903 km^{2} (35,870 sq mi)
Republic of Bashkortostan	Map showing Bashkortostan in Russia	Russian: Республика Башкортостан (Respublika Bashkortostan); Bashkir: Башҡортостан Республикаһы (Başqortostan Respublikahı)	Ufa Russian: Уфа; Bashkir: Өфө (Öfö)	Bashkirs (31.5%) ▲2.0%	37.5% ▲1.4%	4,091,423	142,947 km^{2} (55,192 sq mi)
Republic of Buryatia	Map showing Buryatia in Russia	Russian: Республика Бурятия (Respublika Buryatiya); Buryat: Буряад Улас (Buryaad Ulas)	Ulan-Ude Russian: Улан-Удэ; Buryat: Улаан Үдэ (Ulaan Üde)	Buryats (32.5%) ▲2.5%	64.0% ▼2.1%	978,588	351,334 km^{2} (135,651 sq mi)
Chechen Republic	Map showing Chechnya in Russia	Russian: Чеченская Республика (Chechenskaya Respublika); Chechen: Нохчийн Республика (Noxçiyn Respublika)	Grozny Russian: Грозный; Chechen: Соьлжа-ГӀала (Sölƶa-Ġala)	Chechens (96.4%) ▲1.1%	1.2% ▼0.7%	1,510,824	16,165 km^{2} (6,241 sq mi)
Chuvash Republic	Map showing Chuvashia in Russia	Russian: Чувашская Республика (Chuvashskaya Respublika); Chuvash: Чӑваш Республики (Čăvaš Respubliki)	Cheboksary Russian: Чебоксары; Chuvash: Шупашкар (Šupaškar)	Chuvash (63.7%) ▼4.0%	30.7% ▲3.8%	1,186,909	18,343 km^{2} (7,082 sq mi)
Republic of Dagestan	Map showing Dagestan in Russia	Russian: Республика Дагестан (Respublika Dagestan) Other official names: Aghul: Республика Дагъустан (Respublika Daġustan) Avar: Дагъистаналъул Жумгьурият (Daġistanałul Jumhuriyat) Azerbaijani: Дағыстан Республикасы (Dağıstan Respublikası) Chechen: Дегӏестан Республика (Deġestan Respublika) Dargwa: Дагъистан Республика (Daġistan Respublika) Kumyk: Дагъыстан Жумгьурият (Dağıstan Cumhuriyat) Lak: Дагъусттаннал Республика (Daġusttannal Respublika) Lezgian: Республика Дагъустан (Respublika Daġustan) Nogai: Дагыстан Республикасы (Dağıstan Respublikası) Rutul: Республика Дагъустан (Respublika Daġustan) Tabassaran: Дагъустан Республика (Daġustan Respublika) Tat: Республикей Догъисту (Respublikei Doġistu) Tsakhur: Республика Дагъустан (Respublika Daġustan)	Makhachkala Russian: Махачкала	Thirteen indigenous nationalities (96.1%) 0.0% List: Aghuls (0.9%) Avars (30.5%) Azerbaijanis (3.7%) Chechens (3.2%) Dargins (16.6%) Kumyks (15.8%) Laks (5.2%) Lezgins (13.3%) Nogais (1.2%) Rutuls (0.9%) Tabasarans (4.0%) Tats (0.5%) Tsakhurs (0.3%)	3.3% ▼0.3%	3,182,054	50,270 km^{2} (19,409 sq mi)
Republic of Ingushetia	Map showing Ingushetia in Russia	Russian: Республика Ингушетия (Respublika Ingushetiya); Ingush: ГӀалгӀай Мохк (Ġalġay Moxk)	Magas Russian: Магас; Ingush: Магас (Magas)	Ingush (96.4%) ▲2.3%	0.7% ▼0.1%	509,541	3,123 km^{2} (1,206 sq mi)
Kabardino-Balkar Republic	Map showing Kabardino-Balkaria in Russia	Russian: Кабардино-Балкарская Республика (Kabardino-Balkarskaya Respublika); Kabardian: Къэбэрдей-Балъкъэр Республикэ (Qəbərdey-Batlqər Respublikə); Karachay-Balkar: Къабарты-Малкъар Республика (Qabartı-Malqar Respublika)	Nalchik Russian: Нальчик; Kabardian: Налщӏэч (Nalş’əç); Karachay-Balkar: Нальчик (Nalçik)	Balkars (13.7%) ▲1.0% Kabardians (57.1%) ▼0.1%	19.8% ▼2.7%	904,200	12,470 km^{2} (4,815 sq mi)
Republic of Kalmykia	Map showing Kalmykia in Russia	Russian: Республика Калмыкия (Respublika Kalmykiya); Kalmyk: Хальмг Таңһч (Haľmg Tañğç)	Elista Russian: Элиста; Kalmyk: Элст (Elst)	Kalmyks (62.5%) ▲5.1%	25.7% ▼4.5%	267,133	74,731 km^{2} (28,854 sq mi)
Karachay-Cherkess Republic	Map showing Karachay-Cherkessia in Russia	Russian: Карачаево-Черкесская Республика (Karachayevo-Cherkesskaya Respublika) Other languages: Abaza: Къарча-Черкес Республика (Qarça-Çerkes Respublika) Kabardian: Къэрэшей-Шэрджэс Республикэ (Qərəṩey-Ṩərcəs Respublikə) Karachay-Balkar: Къарачай-Черкес Республика (Qaraçay-Çerkes Respublika) Nogai: Карашай-Шеркеш Республика (Karaşay-Şerkeş Respublika)	Cherkessk Russian: Черкесск (Čerkessk) Other languages: Abaza: Черкес къала (Čerkes q̇ala) Kabardian: Шэрджэс къалэ (Ṩərcəs qalə) Karachay-Balkar: Черкесск (Çerkessk) Nogai: Шеркеш шахар(Şerkeş şahar)	Abazins (8.1%) ▲0.3% Kabardians (12.7%) ▲0.8% Karachays (44.4%) ▲3.4% Nogais (3.7%) ▲0.4%	27.5% ▼4.1%	469,865	14,277 km^{2} (5,512 sq mi)
Republic of Karelia	Map showing Karelia in Russia	Russian: Республика Карелия (Respublika Kareliya); Karelian: Karjalan tazavaldu (Note: The Karelian language has no official status in the republic but is nevertheless recognized as a "regional language" alongside Finnish and Veps.)	Petrozavodsk Russian: Петрозаводск; Karelian: Petroskoi	Karelians (5.5%) ▼1.9%	86.4% ▲4.2%	533,121	180,520 km^{2} (69,699 sq mi)
Republic of Khakassia	Map showing Khakassia in Russia	Russian: Республика Хакасия (Respublika Khakasiya); Khakas: Хакас Республиказы (Xakas Respublikazı)	Abakan Russian: Абакан; Khakas: Абахан (Abaxan)	Khakas (12.7%) ▲0.6%	82.1% ▲0.4%	534,795	61,569 km^{2} (23,772 sq mi)
Komi Republic	Map showing Komi in Russia	Russian: Республика Коми (Respublika Komi); Komi: Коми Республика (Komi Respublika)	Syktyvkar Russian: Сыктывкар; Komi: Сыктывкар (Syktyvkar)	Komi (22.3%) ▼1.4%	69.7% ▲4.6%	737,853	416,774 km^{2} (160,917 sq mi)
Mari El Republic	Map showing Mari El in Russia	Russian: Республика Марий Эл (Respublika Mariy El); Hill Mari: Мары Эл Республик (Mary El Republik); Meadow Mari: Марий Эл Республик (Marij El Republik)	Yoshkar-Ola Russian: Йошкар-Ола (Yoshkar-Ola); Hill Mari: Йошкар-Ола (Joškar-Ola); Meadow Mari: Йошкар-Ола (Joškar-Ola)	Mari (40.1%) ▼3.8%	52.5% ▲5.1%	677,097	23,375 km^{2} (9,025 sq mi)
Republic of Mordovia	Map showing Mordovia in Russia	Russian: Республика Мордовия (Respublika Mordoviya); Erzya: Мордовия Республикась (Mordovija Respublikaś); Moksha: Мордовия Pеспубликась (Mordovija Respublikaś)	Saransk Russian: Саранск; Erzya: Саран ош (Saran oš); Moksha: Саранош (Saranoš)	Mordvins (38.7%) ▼1.4%	54.1% ▲0.7%	783,552	26,128 km^{2} (10,088 sq mi)
Republic of North Ossetia–Alania	Map showing North Ossetia–Alania in Russia	Russian: Республика Северная Осетия–Алания (Respublika Severnaya Osetiya–Alaniya); Iron Ossetic: Республикӕ Цӕгат Ирыстон–Алани (Respublikæ Cægat Iryston–Alani)	Vladikavkaz Russian: Владикавказ; Iron Ossetic: Дзӕуджыхъӕу (Dzæudžyqæu)	Ossetians (68.1%) ▲3.0%	18.9% ▼1.9%	687,357	7,987 km^{2} (3,084 sq mi)
Republic of Sakha (Yakutia)	Map showing the Sakha Republic in Russia	Russian: Республика Саха (Якутия) (Respublika Sakha); Yakut: Саха Өрөспүүбүлүкэтэ (Saxa Öröspüübülükete)	Yakutsk Russian: Якутск (Yakutsk); Yakut: Дьокуускай (Cokuuskay)	Yakuts (55.3%) ▲5.4%	32.6% ▼5.2%	995,686	3,083,523 km^{2} (1,190,555 sq mi)
Republic of Tatarstan	Map showing Tatarstan in Russia	Russian: Республика Татарстан (Respublika Tatarstan); Tatar: Татарстан Республикасы (Tatarstan Respublikası)	Kazan Russian: Казань; Tatar: Казан (Qazan)	Tatars (53.6%) ▲0.4%	40.3% ▲0.6%	4,004,809	67,847 km^{2} (26,196 sq mi)
Republic of Tuva	Map showing Tuva in Russia	Russian: Республика Тува (Respublika Tuva); Tuvan: Тыва Республика (Tıva Respublika)	Kyzyl Russian: Кызыл; Tuvan: Кызыл (Kızıl)	Tuvans (88.7%) ▲6.7%	10.1% ▼6.2%	336,651	168,604 km^{2} (65,098 sq mi)
Udmurt Republic	Map showing Udmurtia in Russia	Russian: Удмуртская Республика (Udmurtskaya Respublika); Udmurt: Удмурт Элькун (Udmurt Elkun)	Izhevsk Russian: Ижевск; Udmurt: Ижкар (Ižkar)	Udmurts (24.1%) ▼3.9%	67.7% ▲5.5%	1,452,914	42,061 km^{2} (16,240 sq mi)

== Proposed republics ==
=== Entities in Russia ===
In response to the apparent federal inequality, in which the republics were given special privileges during the early years of Yeltsin's tenure at the expense of other subjects, Eduard Rossel, then governor of Sverdlovsk Oblast and advocate of equal rights for all subjects, attempted to transform his oblast into the Ural Republic on 1 July 1993 in order to receive the same benefits. Initially supportive, Yeltsin later dissolved the republic and fired Rossel on 9 November 1993. The only other attempt to formally create a republic occurred in Vologda Oblast when authorities declared their wish to create a "Vologda Republic" on 14 May 1993. This declaration, however, was ignored by Moscow and eventually faded from public consciousness. Other attempts to unilaterally create a republic never materialized. These included a "Pomor Republic" in Arkhangelsk Oblast, a "Southern Urals Republic" in Chelyabinsk Oblast, a "Chukotka Republic" in Chukotka Autonomous Okrug, a "Yenisei Republic" in Irkutsk Oblast, a "Leningrad Republic" in Leningrad Oblast, a "Nenets Republic" in the Nenets Autonomous Okrug, a "Siberian Republic" in Novosibirsk Oblast, a "Primorsky Republic" in Primorsky Krai, a "Neva Republic" in the city of Saint Petersburg, and a republic consisting of eleven regions in western Russia centered around Oryol Oblast.

Other attempts to create republics came in the form of splitting up already existing territories. After the Soviet Union's collapse, a proposal was put forth to split the Karachay-Cherkess Republic into multiple smaller republics. The idea was rejected by referendum on 28 March 1992. A similar proposal occurred in the Republic of Mordovia to divide it to separate Erzyan and Mokshan homelands. The proposal was rejected in 1995.

=== Entities outside Russia ===
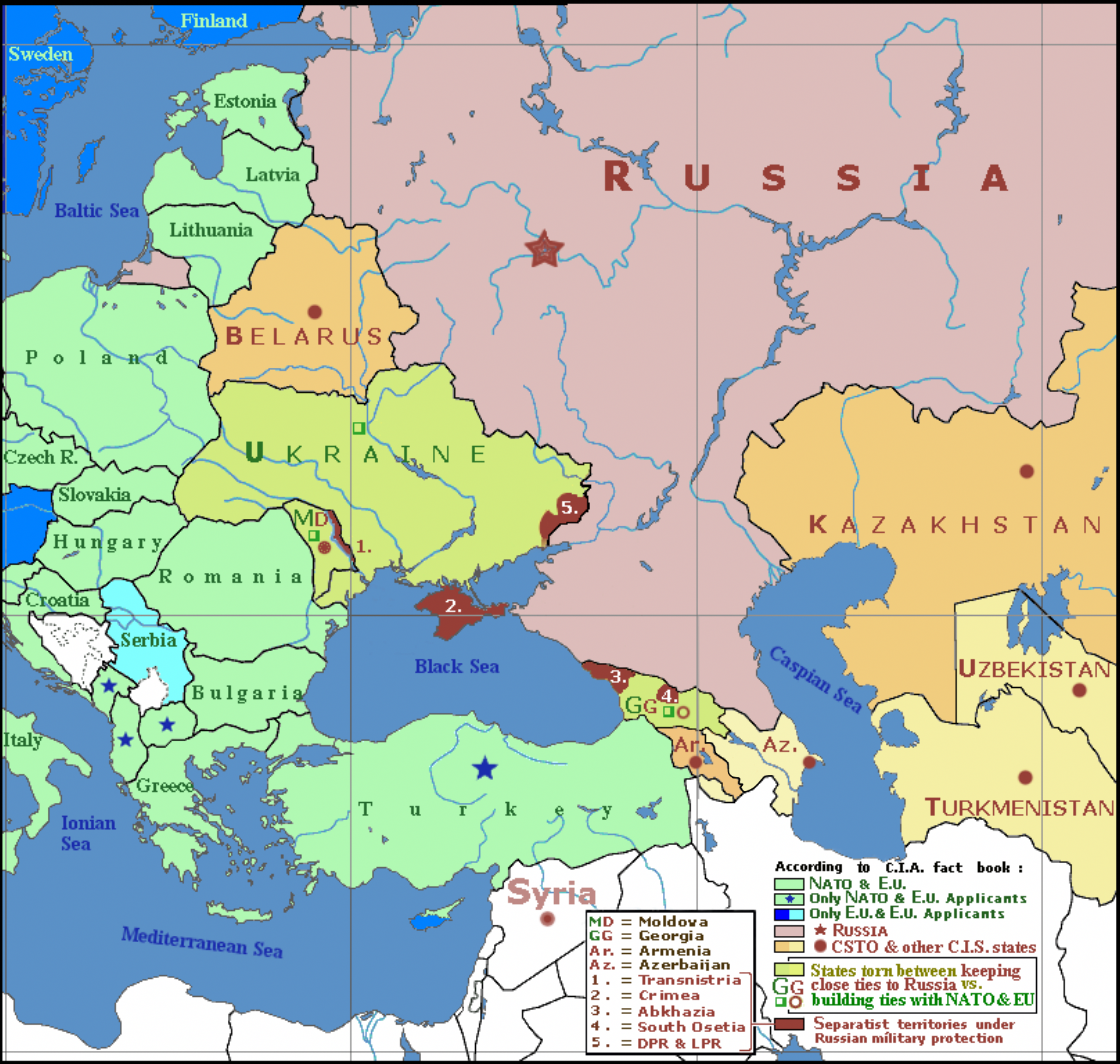
Map showing Russian political and military influence or interference in Post-Soviet conflicts as of 2021

==== Abkhazia ====
After the brief 2008 Russo-Georgian War, Russia secured the de facto independence of Abkhazia from Georgia and promptly recognized it. Georgian officials have expressed worry that Russia will seek to absorb the region. On 25 November 2014, Abkhazia signed a treaty integrating its economy and military with Russia, which Georgia described as a step to "toward de facto annexation". However, the proposal to join Russia has little to no support among Abkhazia's political elite or the general public, with many of the former expressing their view that Abkhazia is different situationally from nearby South Ossetia. Despite this, Abkhazia relies entirely on Russia for financial support and much of its state structure is highly integrated with Russia; it uses the Russian ruble, its foreign policy is coordinated with Russia, and a majority of its citizens have Russian passports. On 12 November 2020, Abkhazia and Russia signed a new integration agreement expanding on their previous one from 2014, which Georgia condemned as another step toward annexation. The new agreement envisioned further harmonization of Abkhazia with Russian law and was criticized within the region for risking the loss of Abkhazia's sovereignty, which the government denied.

==== South Ossetia ====
After the Soviet Union's collapse South Ossetia sought to break away from Georgia and become independent. On 19 January 1992 a referendum was held. Ostensibly, 99.9% of voters approved independence, but the results were not recognized internationally. A second question asking for unification with Russia also ostensibly passed at about 99.9%. Similar to Abkhazia, South Ossetia had its independence secured and recognized by Russia in 2008. However, unlike Abkhazia, officials in both Russia and South Ossetia have repeatedly expressed their wish to see South Ossetia join Russia. An opinion poll conducted in 2010 showed that over 80% of people supported integration with Russia. On 18 March 2015 South Ossetia signed a treaty integrating the region's economy and military with Russia, identical to the one signed by Abkhazia. The treaty was condemned by Georgia as an "actual annexation" of the region. Later that year South Ossetian president Leonid Tibilov said he was preparing a referendum to join Russia. However, such a referendum never took place due to Russia's refusal to endorse the proposal. Instead a referendum was held on 9 April 2017 to change South Ossetia's official name to "Republic of South Ossetia–The State of Alania" to mirror its northern counterpart North Ossetia, officially the "Republic of North Ossetia–Alania", implying future unification.

On 30 March 2022 the government of South Ossetia announced it would revive attempts to hold a referendum on joining Russia. Officials expressed hope of finishing the legal process to hold the referendum by 10 April, however, it is unknown whether Russia will again reject the proposal or not. On 13 May 2022 outgoing president Anatoly Bibilov signed a decree authorizing a referendum on annexation by 17 July. However, Alan Gagloyev, who defeated Bibilov in an election, expressed skepticism, saying that while he does not oppose the referendum, he believes there should first be a "signal" from Russia. Gagloyev promptly scrapped the referendum pending talks with Russia on integration.

==== Transnistria ====
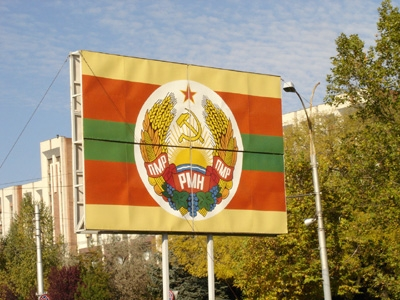
A billboard in Tiraspol, Transnistria, with Soviet symbolism. Nostalgia for the Soviet Union and Russian influence remain common in Transnistria, which has made repeated requests to join Russia.

Transnistria, a breakaway region of Moldova, had long sought to rejoin Russia since the collapse of the Soviet Union. After proclaiming independence and fighting a war against Moldova with the help of Russia in 1992, the region has remained under Russian occupation. Transnistria made multiple appeals to integrate with Russia, which the latter has consistently ignored. In a 2006 referendum an overwhelming majority of people voted in favor of its accession to Russia, though these results could not be independently confirmed. After Russia's annexation of Crimea in 2014, Transnistria appealed to Russia to join it. There is still some hope inside Transnistria for Russia to annex the region. Despite ignoring Transnistria's appeals for accession, the region enjoys Russian support and is highly dependent on it. Over 200,000 Transnistrian citizens own a Russian passport and many prefer to leave the region and work in Russia. Russia provides gas at bargain prices, pays the pensions of its residents, and allocates funds to build infrastructure. A Russian military garrison operates in Transnistria ostensibly as a peacekeeping force. Moldova for its part rejects any attempt by Transnistria to secede and join Russia and insists on the withdrawal of all Russian troops from the region. With Russia's invasion of Ukraine in 2022 a Russian general said they planned to create a land bridge connecting to Transnistria. The region has also suffered significant trade losses due to the invasion of Ukraine and has become more reliant on trade with the European Union.

== See also ==
- Oblasts of Russia
- Krais of Russia
- Autonomous okrugs of Russia
- Federal cities of Russia
- Jewish Autonomous Oblast

== Sources ==
- Heaney, Dominic, ed. (2018). The Territories of the Russian Federation 2018. Europa Territories of the World series. Routledge. p. 180. ISBN 978-1-35110-391-6. OCLC 1027753558.
- Heaney, Dominic, ed. (2022). "Territorial Surveys". The Territories of the Russian Federation 2022 (23rd ed.). Abingdon: Routledge. ISBN 9781032249698. Archived from the original on 11 November 2022.
- Heaney, Dominic, ed. (2023). "The Government of the Russian Federation". The Territories of the Russian Federation 2023 (24th ed.). Abingdon: Routledge. pp. 43–51. ISBN 9781032469744. Archived from the original on 16 August 2023.
- John Raymond, Walter (1992). Dictionary of Politics: Selected American and Foreign Political and Legal Terms. Brunswick Publishing Corp. p. 120. ISBN 9781556180088.
- Cope, Zak; Ness, Immanuel (2016). The Palgrave Encyclopedia of Imperialism and Anti-Imperialism. Palgrave Macmillian. p. 237. ISBN 978-0-230-39278-6.
- Feldbrugge, Ferdinand; Simons, William; Van den Berg, Gerard (1985). Encyclopedia of Soviet Law. Martinus Nijhoff Publishers. p. 467. ISBN 90-247-3075-9.
- Blakkisrud, Helge (2023). "Ethnic Relations". In Gill, Graeme (ed.). Routledge Handbook of Russian Politics and Society (Second ed.). Abingdon/New York: Routledge. pp. 449–462. ISBN 978-1-032-11052-3.
- Sakwa, Richard (2023). "Democratisation". In Gill, Graeme (ed.). Routledge Handbook of Russian Politics and Society (Second ed.). Abingdon/New York: Routledge. pp. 33–45. ISBN 978-1-032-11052-3.
- Kemp, Walter (1999). Nationalism and Communism in Eastern Europe and the Soviet Union: A Basic Contradiction?. Macmillian Press LTD. p. 79. ISBN 978-0-230-37525-3.
- Chulos, Chris; Piirainen, Timo (2000). The Fall of an Empire, the Birth of a Nation: National Identities in Russia. Ashgate Publishing. p. 85. ISBN 978-1-315-20039-2.
- Rett, Ludwikowski (1996). Constitution-making in the Region of Former Soviet Dominance. Duke University Press. p. 618. ISBN 978-0-8223-1802-6.
- Kotljarchuk, Andrej; Sundström, Olle (2017). Ethnic and Religious Minorities in Stalin's Soviet Union: New Dimensions of Research (PDF). Södertörn University. pp. 15–16. ISBN 978-91-7601-777-7. Archived (PDF) from the original on 7 March 2019.
- Bugay, Nikolay (1996). The Deportation of Peoples in the Soviet Union. Nova Science Publishers. p. 156. ISBN 1-56072-371-8.
- Askerov, Ali (2015). Historical Dictionary of the Chechen Conflict. Rowman & Littlefield. p. 12. ISBN 978-1-4422-4925-7.
- Guchinova, Elza-Bair (2007). Deportation of the Kalmyks (1943–1956): Stigmatized Ethnicity. Hokkaido University Press. pp. 187–188.
- Tanner, Arno (2004). The Forgotten Minorities of Eastern Europe: The History and Today of Selected Ethnic Groups in Five Countries. East-West Books. p. 31. ISBN 9789529168088.
- Polian, Pavel (2004). Against Their Will: The History and Geography of Forced Migrations in the USSR. Central European University Press. p. 199. ISBN 963-9241-68-7.
- Gladman, Imogen (2004). The Territories of the Russian Federation 2004. Europa Publications. p. 102. ISBN 1-85743-248-7.
- Simons, Greg; Westerlund, David (2015). Religion, Politics and Nation-Building in Post-Communist Countries. Ashgate Publishing. p. 81. ISBN 9781472449696.
- Ross, Cameron (2002). Regional Politics in Russia. Manchester University Press. p. 207. ISBN 0-7190-5890-2.
- Newton, Julie; Tompson, William (2010). Institutions, Ideas and Leadership in Russian Politics. Palgrave Macmillian. p. 119. ISBN 978-1-349-36232-5.
- Kahn, Jeffery (2002). Federalism, Democratization, and the Rule of Law in Russia. Oxford University Press. p. 106. ISBN 0-19-924699-8.
- Berman, Margo; Yakovlev, Alexander (1996). Striving for Law in a Lawless Land: Memoirs of a Russian Reformer. M.E. Sharpe. pp. 104–105. ISBN 1-56324-639-2.
- Saunders, Robert A.; Strukov, Vlad (2010). Historical Dictionary of the Russian Federation. Scarecrow Press. pp. 59. ISBN 978-0-8108-7460-2.
- René, De La Pedraja (2018). The Russian Military Resurgence: Post-Soviet Decline and Rebuilding, 1992-2018. McFarland & Company. pp. 147–148. ISBN 978-1-47666-991-5.
- Boex, Jameson; Martinez-Vazquez, Jorge (2001). Russia's Transition to a New Federalism. International Bank for Reconstruction. p. 4. ISBN 0-8213-4840-X.
- Clark, Terry; Kempton, Daniel (2002). Unity or Separation: Center-Periphery Relations in the Former Soviet Union. Praeger. p. 77. ISBN 0-275-97306-9.
- Sergunin, Alexander (2016). Explaining Russian Foreign Policy Behavior: Theory and Practice. Ibidem. p. 185. ISBN 978-3-8382-6782-1.
- Kempton, Daniel; Clark, Terry (2002). Unity or Separation: Center-Periphery Relations in the Former Soviet Union. Praeger. pp. 39–40. ISBN 0-275-97306-9.
- Wegren, Stephen (2015). Putin's Russia: Past Imperfect, Future Uncertain. Rowman & Littlefield. p. 68. ISBN 978-1-4422-3919-7.
- Goode, J. Paul (2011). The Decline of Regionalism in Putin's Russia: Boundary Issues. Routledge. p. 95. ISBN 978-0-203-81623-3.
- Heaney, Dominic (2009). The Territories of the Russian Federation 2009. Routledge. p. 12. ISBN 978-1-857-43517-7.
- Bell, Imogen (2003). The Territories of the Russian Federation 2003. Europa Publications. p. 78. ISBN 1-85743-191-X.
- Lussier, Danielle; Orttung, Robert; Paretskaya, Anna (2000). The Republics and Regions of the Russian Federation: A Guide to Politics, Policies, and Leaders. EastWest Institute. pp. 523–524. ISBN 0-7656-0559-7.
- Rubin, Barnett; Snyder, Jack (2002). Post-Soviet Political Order. Routledge. pp. 69. ISBN 0-415-17069-9.
- Joshau, Woods; Shlapentokh, Vladimir (2007). Contemporary Russia as a Feudal Society: A New Perspective on the Post-Soviet Era. Springer. pp. 105–106. ISBN 978-0-230-60969-3.
- Ross, Cameron (2003). Federalism and Democratisation in Russia. Manchester University Press. pp. 24–25. ISBN 978-0-7190-5869-1.
- Roeder, Philip (2007). Where Nation-States Come From: Institutional Change in the Age of Nationalism. Princeton University Press. p. 134. ISBN 978-0-691-12728-6.
- Sotiriou, Stylianos (2019). Politics and International Relations in Eurasia. Lexington Books. p. 100. ISBN 9781498565394.
