= Treaty of Federation =

1992 anti-secession agreement between Russia and most of its regions

The Treaty of Federation (Russian: Федеративный договор, romanized: Federativnyy dogovor) was a treaty signed on 31 March 1992 in Moscow between the Russian government and 86 of 89 federal subjects of Russia.

The Treaty of Federation refers to three documents of the same content, signed by representatives of the

1. republics (mentioned as "sovereign republics"),
2. krais, oblasts, cities of Moscow and Saint Petersburg,
3. autonomous oblasts and autonomous okrugs,

and the Russian Federation. It was approved by the 6th Congress of People's Deputies of Russia on 10 April 1992. The provisions of the Treaty were included in the Constitution of 1978, introducing the basic principles of federalism in Russia.

The objective of the treaty was to prevent ethnic separatist movements from disintegrating the newly independent Russian Federation, as had happened to the Soviet Union.

The autonomous regions agreed to remain part of Russia in return for a greater autonomy and a larger share of natural resources. Chechnya and Tatarstan refused to sign the treaty. The treaty established republics as having greater power compared to other federal subjects of Russia. This legal imbalance was addressed by the Russian Constitution of 1993, which stipulated that all federal subjects had equal rights in their relationships with the federal government.
