= India-Russia RELOS Agreement =

2025 defence logistics agreement between India and Russia

The India–Russia RELOS Agreement (Reciprocal Exchange of Logistics Agreement) is a bilateral defence logistics pact between India and Russia that enables mutual access to military facilities, including airbases, for logistical support and cooperation. The agreement was signed in Moscow on February 18, 2025. Russian President Vladimir Putin signed it into federal law on December 15, 2025.

== Background ==
India and Russia have maintained longstanding defence relations, with cooperation spanning arms procurement, joint exercises, and strategic coordination. The RELOS agreement emerged as part of ongoing efforts to expand bilateral military interoperability and logistical coordination.

According to analysts, such agreements are typically designed to facilitate refuelling, maintenance, and support for military assets operating in each other's territories, thereby improving operational reach and efficiency.

== Agreement ==
Under the RELOS agreement, India and Russia can use each other's military bases and other infrastructure for logistical purposes, such as airbases. According to reports, the pact also permits the temporary presence of military personnel from both countries, with a limit of up to 3,000 troops on each side under agreed conditions. Russian political scientist and First Deputy Chairman of the International Affairs Committee, Vyacheslav Nikonov, has further specified that the agreement is valid for an initial period of five years and can be extended for another five years by mutual consent.

The agreement was finalised ahead of a planned visit by Russian President Vladimir Putin, indicating continued high-level defence engagement between the two countries.

== Strategic significance ==
Analysts have offered differing views on the significance of the agreement. Some analysts view the agreement as strengthening defence cooperation between the two countries, while others see it mainly as formalising arrangements that were already in place.

It is expected to make it easier for both sides to support joint exercises and related military activities, and is seen as part of their continuing defence relationship.

== See also ==
- India–Russia relations
- India–Soviet Union relations
