= Russians in India =

Ethnic group

Total population
- 6,000 - 15,000+

Regions with significant populations
- Goa · Karnataka · Maharashtra · Tamil Nadu · Bihar · Delhi · Ranchi

Languages
- Russian · English · Konkani · Tamil · Marathi · Other Indian languages

Religion
- Russian Orthodox Church; Roman Catholicism · Hinduism · Judaism

Related ethnic groups
- Russian people

There is a small but recognisable Russian community in India which comprises Indian citizens of Russian heritage as well with Russian expatriates and migrants residing in India. According to the Russian government, 845 Russian citizens are registered as living in India.

== Russians in Goa ==
=== Immigrants ===
The state of Goa have received many Russian immigrants in the last few years. The Russian exodus to Goa has become a trend as young people who are unhappy with life back home are moving there in search of inner peace. Cheap daily charter flights are now carrying thousands of Russians to the Indian State of Goa famous for its beaches and laid-back mood. Many Russians have also set up businesses in Goa. Many beach side restaurants post their signboards in English and Russian to attract Russian-speaking customers.

The village of Morjim is dubbed "Little Russia" by locals because of the high number of Russians living there. The village of Arambol is colloquially known as Arambolsk.

=== Tourists ===
Goa has always been the favourite haunt among Russian travelers to India. On average, an estimated 3,500 Russians would descend on Goa's shores every ten days in the tourism season.

== See also ==
- India–Russia relations
- Indians in Russia
- Consulate General of Russia, Chennai
