= Indians in Russia =

Ethnic group in Russia

Russian Indians Русские индийцы
Regions with significant populations
- Astrakhan · Yekaterinburg · Saint Petersburg · Moscow

Languages
- Russian · Various Indian Languages · English

Religion
- Hinduism • Christianity • Sikhism • Islam

Related ethnic groups
- People of Indian Origin

Russian Indians include Indian expatriates in Russia, as well as Russian citizens of Indian origin or descent.

== Demography ==
According to the Ministry of External affairs, there are approximately 62,825 Indians in Russia. In addition to this, there are also about 1500 Afghan nationals of Indian origin living in the country.

== History ==
In the late eighteenth century, Russian traveller Pallas noted the presence of hundreds of Multani Vaiṣṇava Hindu merchant families in Astrakhan at the mouth of the Volga river.

The Hindustani Samaj is the oldest Indian organization to be set up in Russia, in 1957 in the former USSR. The Jawaharlal Nehru Cultural Center was opened in 1989 for propagating Indian culture in the Soviet Union. Its idea was conceived after the great success of the Festival of India, held in 1988 in the USSR.

In May 2022, two consignments of medicine were sent to Russian soldiers during the invasion of Ukraine, under the initiative of Disha.

During the invasion of Ukraine, dozens of Indians were recruited to serve in the Russian Armed Forces. Most of them were deceived by recruiters promising them money and jobs. According to a Russian official, as of February 2024, around 100 Indians had been recruited. Indians were sent to work on the front, with nine of them having been killed as of September 2024. Following a visit in Moscow by Indian Prime Minister Narendra Modi, in July 2024 Russia promised to discharge all Indians fighting in its army. As of September, 45 Indians had been released.

== Religion ==
A majority of Indians living in Russia are Hindus, with other populations including Christians of Indian origin, Muslims, and Sikhs. Hinduism is practised in Russia, though most ignore it, primarily by followers of the Vaishnava Hindu organization International Society for Krishna Consciousness, Brahma Kumaris and by itinerant swamis from India.

== Notable people ==
- Annet Mahendru – actress
- Abani Mukherji – Indian revolutionary and co-founder of the Communist Party of India (CPI)

== See also ==
- Hinduism in Russia
- India–Russia relations
- Russians in India
