= India–Russia relations =

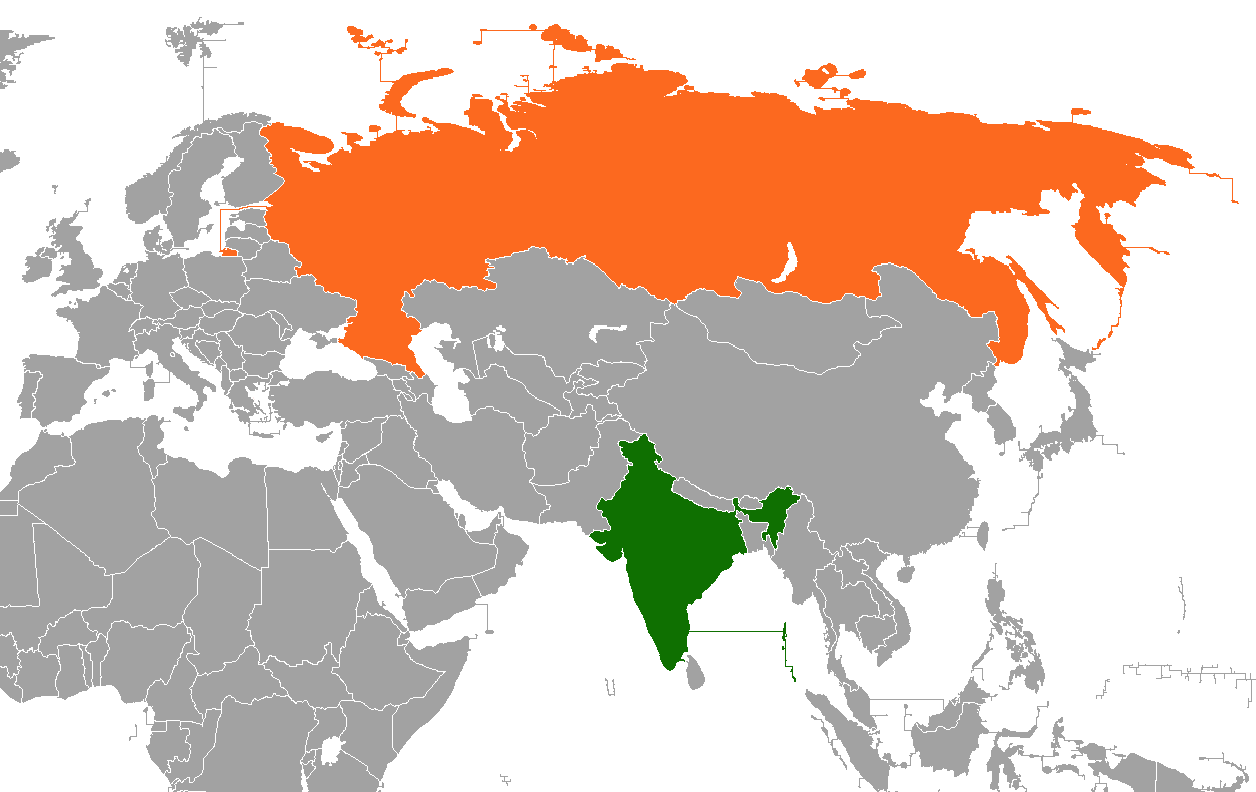
- India: Russia

Diplomatic mission
- Embassy of India, Moscow: Embassy of Russia, New Delhi

Envoy
- Ambassador Vinay Kumar: Ambassador Denis Alipov

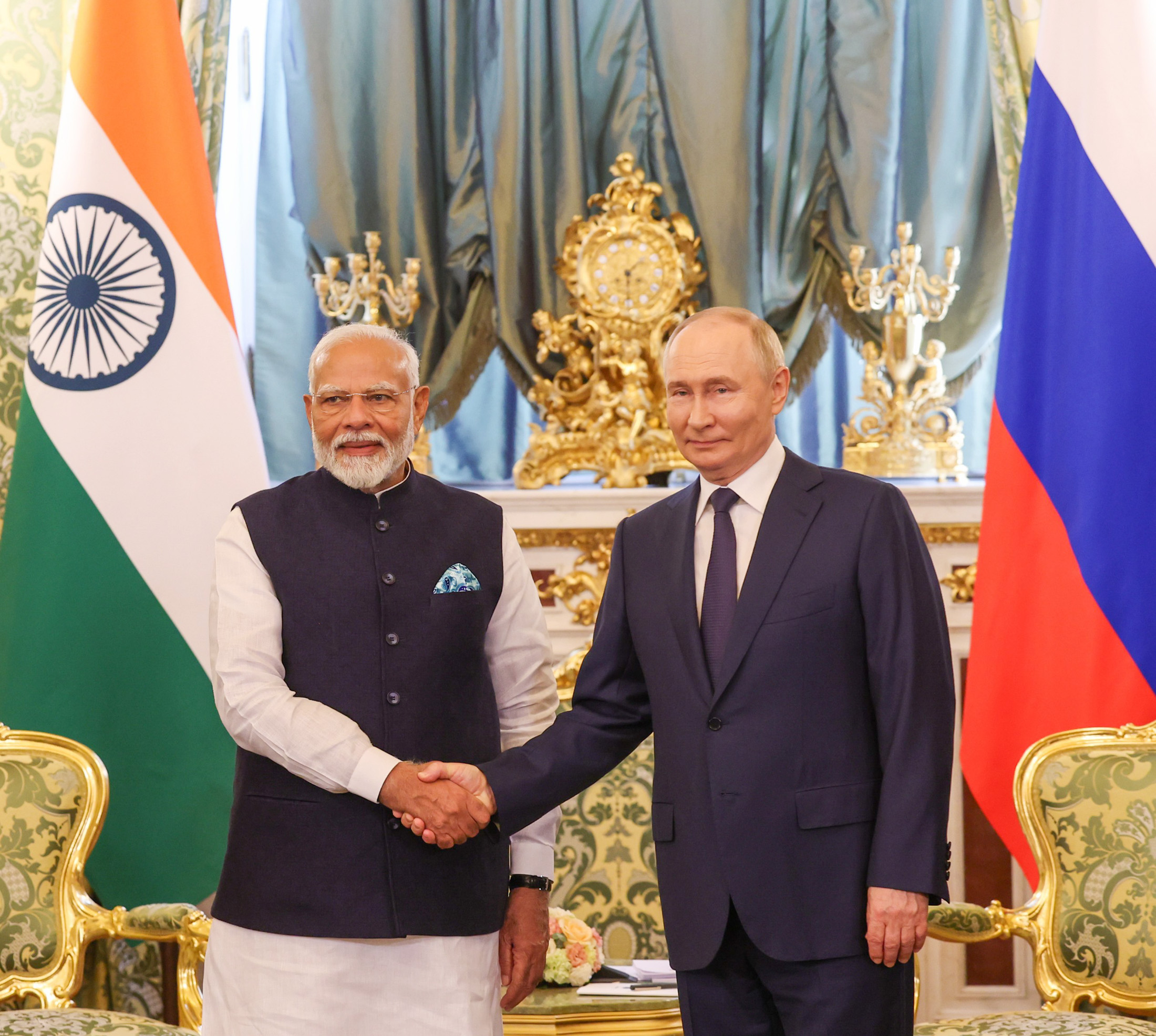
Prime Minister of India Narendra Modi and President of Russia Vladimir Putin in Moscow, Russia, 9 July 2024

The Republic of India and the Russian Federation established bilateral relations in 1991 and remain close allies. Previously, during the Cold War, Indian–Soviet relations were considered a "strong strategic relationship". This diplomatic unity was further strengthened with both nations' shared military ideals, as well as their overall economic policies. After the dissolution of the Soviet Union, Russia kept the same close ties to India; in international terms, both nations Russia and India consider their mutual affinity to be a "strategic partnership". Their governments support the creation of a multipolar world order in which both nations are "poles".

Traditionally, the Indian–Russian strategic partnership has been built on five major components: politics, defence, civil nuclear energy, anti-terrorism co-operation, as well as the advancement of and exploration of outer space travel. These five major components were highlighted in a speech given by former Indian Foreign Secretary Ranjan Mathai in Russia. The IRIGC (India-Russia Intergovernmental Commission) is the main body that conducts affairs at the governmental level between both countries. Both countries are members of international bodies including the UN, BRICS, G20 and SCO. Russia has stated that it supports India receiving a permanent seat on the United Nations Security Council. In addition, Russia has expressed interest in joining SAARC with observer status in which India is a founding member.

India is the second largest market for the Russian defence industry. In 2017, approximately 68% of the Indian military's hardware import came from Russia, making Russia the chief supplier of defence equipment. India has an embassy in Moscow and two consulate-generals (in Saint Petersburg and Vladivostok). Russia has an embassy in New Delhi and six consulate-generals (in Chennai, Goa, Hyderabad, Kolkata, Mumbai and Trivandrum).

== Historical relations ==
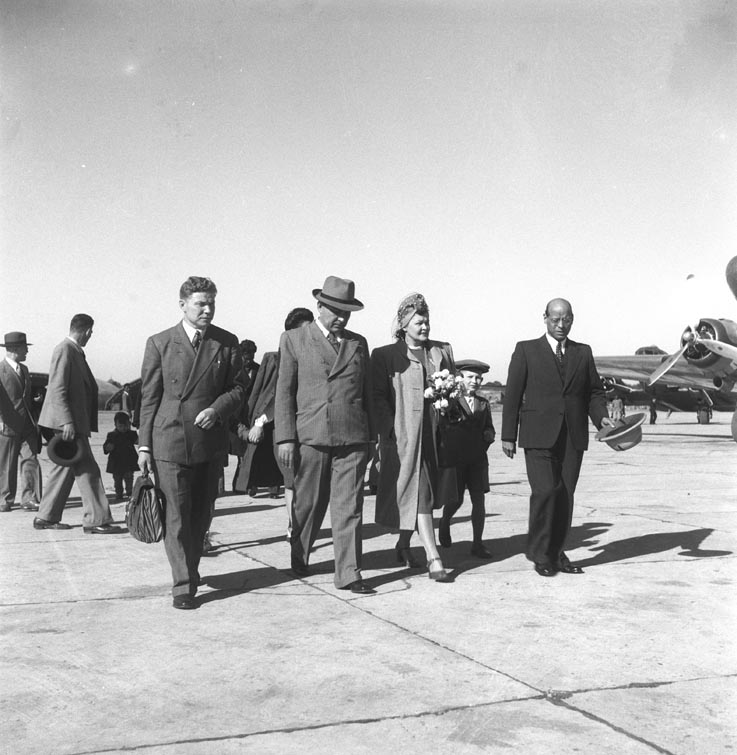
Soviet Ambassador Kirill Novikov arriving in New Delhi 1947 to establish formal diplomatic relations with India

Goods uncovered from archaeological site such as Pazyryk indicates that nomads inhabiting the area conducted trading activities with India during 4th-3rd century BCE. In 1468, Russian traveller Afanasy Nikitin began his journey to India for trade. Between 1468 and 1472, he travelled through Persia, India and the Ottoman Empire but returned soon within three years from Indian subcontinent as he could not afford much to himself. In the 18th century the Russian city of Astrakhan was frequently visited by Indian merchants when it was under Mughal rule. Russia and Iran were used as a transit trade between Western Europe and India, especially after Peter the Great requested from Mughal Emperor Aurangzeb the commencement of trade relations in 1696. Decades later, the Russian czar personally granted Anbu-Ram Mulin's Indian trading company the right to resolve property rights issues in Astrakhan, thus allowing Indians to bring in caravans with their linen fabrics, cottons, silks, and Indian, Persian and Uzbek cloth. The Astrakhan governor was ordered to show "kindness and goodwill" to the Indian merchants in Russia, who cherished their religious freedom and special trade privileges that they never had in other Eastern countries; until the middle of the 18th century, members of the community only paid 12 rubles a year as rent for a shop in the Indian Trading Compound, and were exempted from taxes and duties by the Russian authorities. The value of goods exported by them from Astrakhan into the interior cities of Russia in 1724 exceeded 104,000 rubles, amounting to nearly a quarter of all Astrakhan trade, until British occupation stopped independent Indian trade with Russia altogether.

In 1801, Tsar Paul ordered plans made for the invasion of British India by 22,000 Cossacks, which never actually occurred due to poor handling of preparations. The intention was that Russia would form an alliance with France, and attack the British Empire and its weak point using a French corps of 35,000 men and a Russian corps of 25,000 infantry and 10,000 mounted Cossacks. Some Cossacks had approached Orenburg when the tsar was assassinated. His successor Alexander I immediately cancelled the plans. The Embassy of India in Moscow (Hindi: मॉस्को में भारत का दूतावास; Russian: Посольство Индии в России) was built in 1900, and transferred to the Indian government in 1952 to become an embassy building. The embassy consists of several buildings, including an aristocratic style "Chancery Building", a rational-modern style ambassador's residence, and a French style building known as "Napoleon's Dacha". The Chancery building was previously owned by an arts patron, a textile magnate, and the Soviet government, before being transferred to the Indian government in 1952 to become the embassy it is today.

Embassy of Russia in New Delhi（Russian: Посольство России в Индии ; Hindi: रूस का दूतावास, नई दिल्ली）is the official diplomatic mission of the Russian Federation in the Republic of India. The Russian consulate in India was opened in Mumbai in 1900 and moved to Kolkata in 1910. Initially it was housed in the Travancore House located at Curzon Street, now Kasturba Gandhi Marg. In several years India allocated previously undeveloped land to create a district of Chanakyapuri for diplomatic missions. The Soviet Union was assigned two lots of total acres of 22 acres, and in February 1956 a lease agreement was concluded between the two countries. A declassified 1985 CIA report states that the Press Section of the Soviet Embassy "is a KGB operation that specializes in fast-breaking disinformation campaigns, principally targeted against the United States." In particular, the efforts of this operation were directed at the implication of the United States in the assassination of Indira Gandhi and at linking Jeane Kirkpatrick with a plan to Balkanize India.

=== India and the Soviet Union ===
India–Soviet Union relations

- India: Soviet Union

India's official diplomatic relations with the Soviet Union were established in April 1947, shortly before it declared its independence from Britain. As Izvestia reported on 15 April 1947, “as a result of an exchange of letters between the Indian ambassador to China, Mr. K. P. S. Menon and the Soviet ambassador to China Apollon Petrov, it was established that the Government of the USSR and the Government of India will publish simultaneously in Moscow and New Delhi the following official statement: “In an effort to preserve and further strengthen the friendly relations existing between the USSR and India, the Government of the USSR and the Government of India have decided to exchange diplomatic representations at the rank of Embassies”.

In 1951, the USSR exercised its veto power on the Kashmir dispute in support of India. In 1953, Joseph Stalin told Sarvepalli Radhakrishnan that, "Both you and Mr. Nehru are persons whom we do not consider our enemies. This will continue to be our policy and you can count on our help." The relationship strengthened by 1955 and represented the successful Soviet attempts to foster closer relations with countries belonging to the Non-Aligned Movement. In 1955, Prime Minister Jawaharlal Nehru made his first visit to the Soviet Union in June 1955, and First Secretary of the Communist Party Nikita Khrushchev's return trip to India happened in the fall of 1955. In India, Khrushchev announced that the Soviet Union supported Indian sovereignty over the disputed territory of the Kashmir region and also over Portuguese coastal enclaves such as Goa.

The Soviet Union's strong relations with India had a negative impact upon both Soviet relations with the People's Republic of China and Indian relations with the PRC during the Khrushchev period. The Soviet Union declared its neutrality during the 1959 border dispute and the Sino-Indian War of October 1962, although the Chinese strongly objected. The Soviet Union gave India substantial economic and military assistance during the Khrushchev period, and by 1960, India had received more Soviet assistance than China had. This disparity became another point of contention in Sino-Soviet relations. In 1962 the Soviet Union agreed to transfer technology to co-produce the Mikoyan-Gurevich MiG-21 jet fighter in India, which the Soviet Union had earlier denied to China. In 1965, the Soviet Union successfully served as a peace broker between India and Pakistan after the Indo-Pakistani War of 1965. The Soviet chairman of the Council of Ministers, literally Premier of the Soviet Union, Alexei Kosygin, met with representatives of India and Pakistan and helped them negotiate an end to the military conflict over Kashmir.

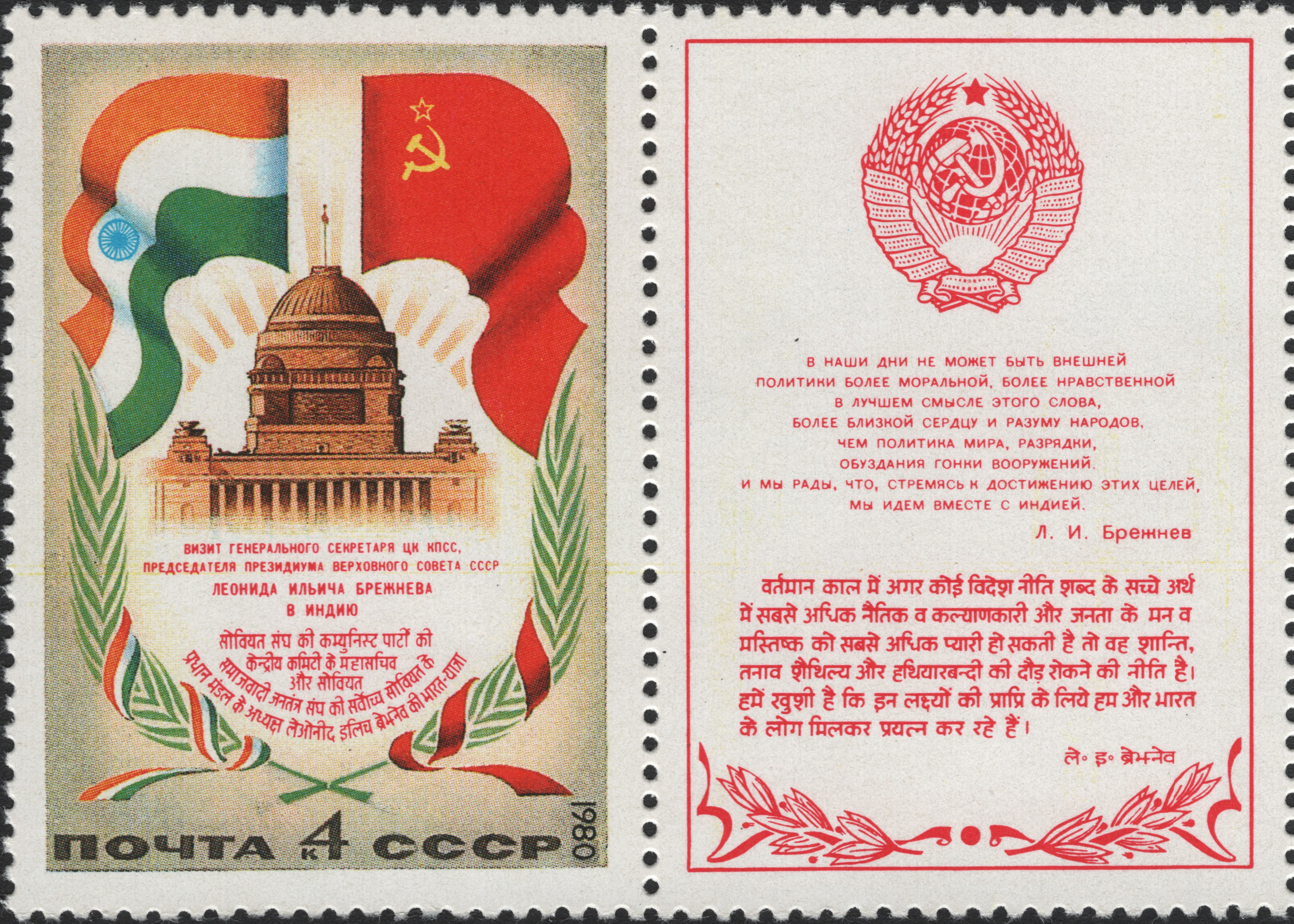
Soviet-Indian postage stamp

In 1971, the former East Pakistan region initiated an effort to secede from its political union with West Pakistan. India supported the secession, and the U.S. considered the possible entrance of China to further destabilize India in its taking up a moral leadership in the area. However, China, after the Sino-Indian War, did not want to participate in the United States' bid in supporting Yahya Khan's atrocities in present-day Bangladesh. Meanwhile, India's relationship with the Soviet Union grew strategically and resulted in the Indo-Soviet Treaty of Friendship and Cooperation of August 1971. In December, it helped India halt American adventurism by using military power and end the conflict which ensured the victory of the secessionists in the establishment of the new state of Bangladesh.

Relations between the Soviet Union and India did not suffer much during the right-wing Janata Party's coalition government in the late 1970s, although India did move to establish better economic and military relations with Western countries. To counter these efforts by India to diversify its relations, the Soviet Union proffered additional weaponry and economic assistance. During the 1980s, despite the 1984 assassination by Sikh separatists of Prime Minister Indira Gandhi, the mainstay of cordial Indian-Soviet relations, India maintained a close relationship with the Soviet Union. Indicating the high priority of relations with the Soviet Union in Indian foreign policy, the new Indian prime minister, Rajiv Gandhi, visited the Soviet Union on his first state visit abroad in May 1985 and signed two long-term economic agreements with the Soviet Union. According to Rejaul Karim Laskar, a scholar of Indian foreign policy, during this visit, Rajiv Gandhi developed a personal rapport with Soviet General Secretary Mikhail Gorbachev. In turn, Gorbachev's first visit to a Third World state was his meeting with Rajiv Gandhi in New Delhi in late 1986. General Secretary Gorbachev unsuccessfully urged Rajiv Gandhi to help the Soviet Union set up an Asian collective security system. Gorbachev's advocacy of this proposal, which had also been made by Leonid Brezhnev, was an indication of continuing Soviet interest in using close relations with India as a means of containing China. With the improvement of Sino-Soviet relations in the late 1980s, containing China had less of a priority, but close relations with India remained important as an example of Gorbachev's new Third World policy.

=== Modern political relations ===
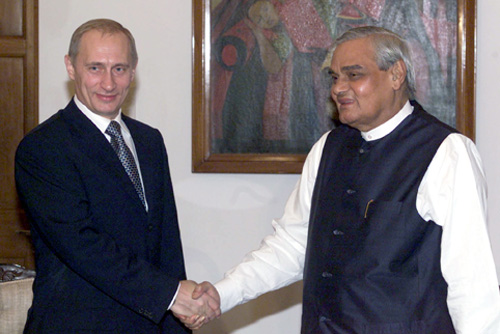
Former prime minister Atal Bihari Vajpayee with Russia's president Vladimir Putin in October 2000.

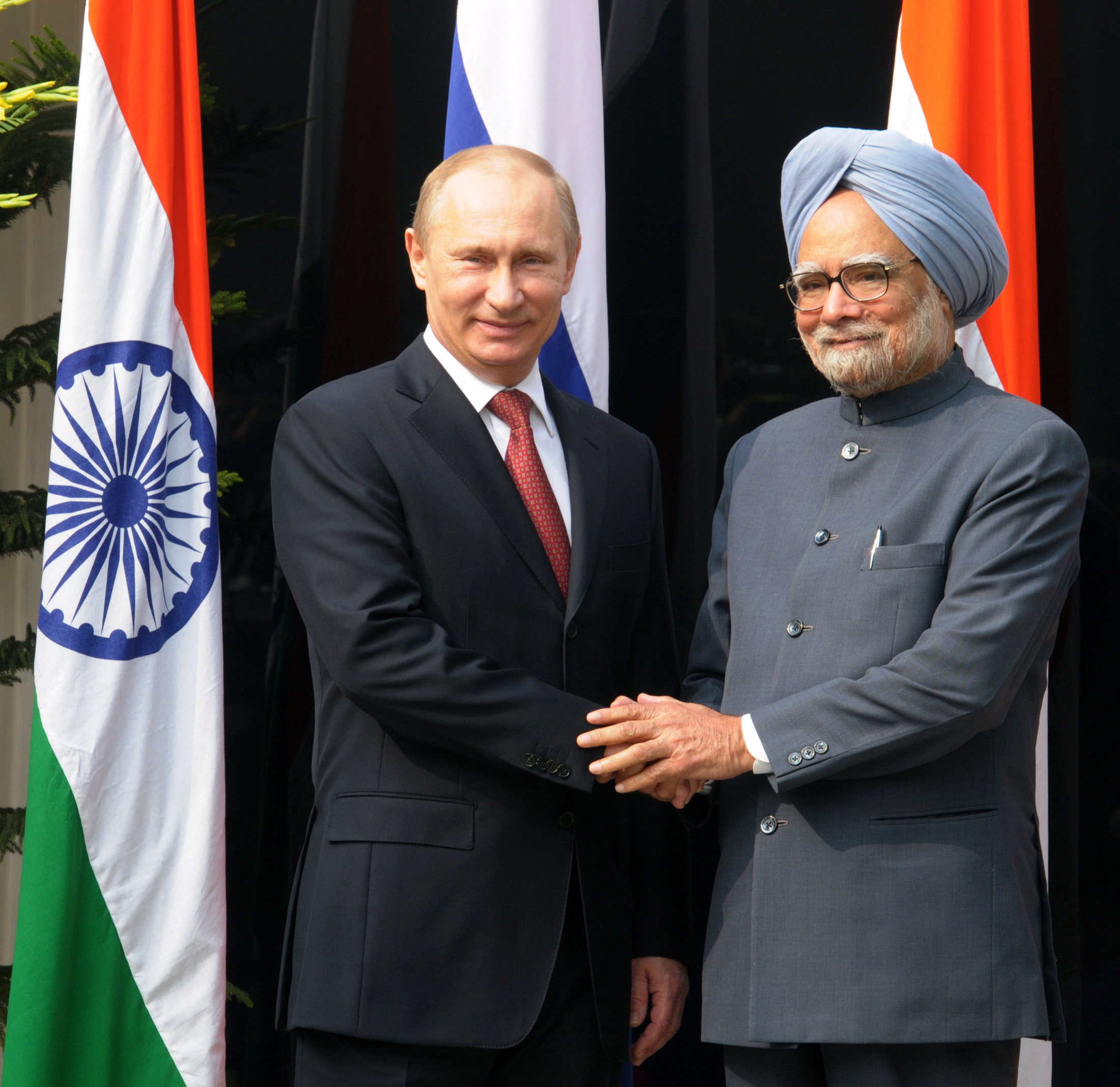
The Prime Minister of India, Manmohan Singh meeting the president of the Russian Federation, Mr. Vladimir Putin, in New Delhi on 24 December 2012.

The first major political initiative, since the collapse of the Soviet Union, between India and Russia began with the Strategic Partnership signed between the two countries in 2000. President Vladimir Putin stated in an article written by him in The Hindu, "The Declaration on Strategic Partnership between India and Russia signed in October 2000 became a truly historic step". Former prime minister Manmohan Singh also agreed with his counterpart by stating in a speech given during President Putin's 2012 visit to India, "President Putin is a valued friend of India and the original architect of the India-Russia strategic partnership". Both countries closely collaborate on matters of shared national interest these include at the UN, BRICS, G20 and SCO. Russia also supports India receiving a permanent seat on the United Nations Security Council. In addition, Russia has vocally backed India joining the NSG and APEC. Moreover, it has also expressed interest in joining SAARC with observer status in which India is a founding member.

Russia currently is one of only two countries in the world (the other being Japan) that has a mechanism for annual ministerial-level defence reviews with India. The Indian–Russian Inter-Governmental Commission (IRIGC) is one of the largest and most comprehensive governmental mechanisms that India has had with any country internationally. Almost every department from the Government of India attends it.

Relations with India have always been and I am sure will be one of the most important foreign policy priorities of our country. Our mutual ties of friendship are filled with sympathy, and trust, and openness. And we must say frankly that they were never overshadowed by disagreements or conflict. This understanding - this is indeed the common heritage of our peoples. It is valued and cherished in our country, in Russia, and in India. And we are rightfully proud of so close, so close relations between our countries.

— Dmitry Medvedev, about relations with India

We are confident that India lives in the hearts of every Russian. In the same way, I can assure you that Russia also lives in our souls as a homeland, as people who share our emotions, our feelings of mutual respect and constant friendship. Long live our friendship!

— Pratibha Patil, about relations with Russia

... India-Russia relationship is one of deep friendship and mutual confidence that would not be affected by transient political trends. Russia has been a pillar of strength at difficult moments in India's history. India will always reciprocate this support. Russia is and will remain our most important defense partner and a key partner for our energy security, both on nuclear energy and hydrocarbons.

— Pranab Mukherjee, about relations with Russia

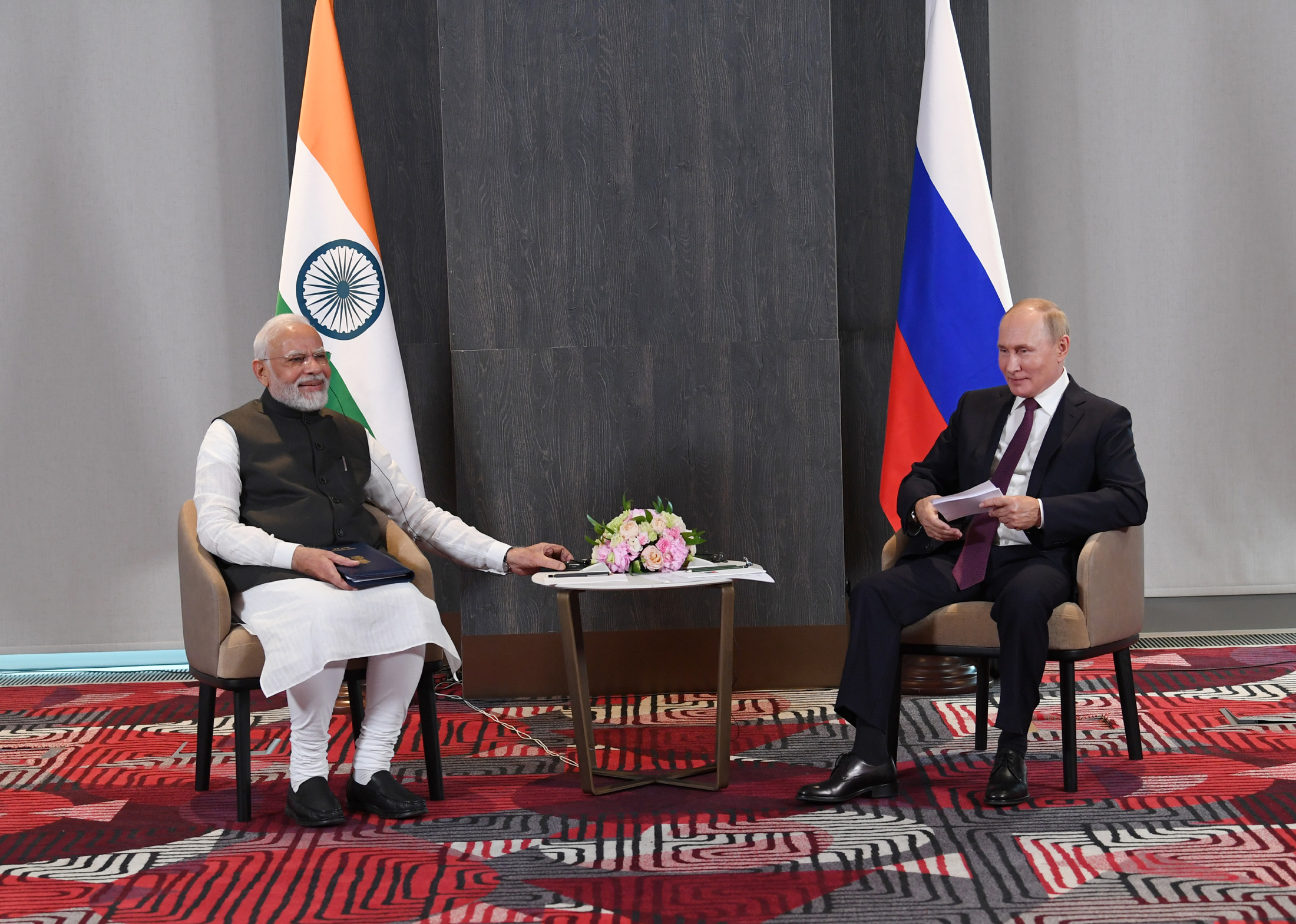
Indian Prime Minister Narendra Modi and Russian President Vladimir Putin on 16 September 2022

In May 2022, Russian political scientist Sergey Karaganov, who is considered close to Vladimir Putin and Sergey Lavrov, stated that India figured extremely high on the agenda of the Russian foreign policy and strong India-Russia ties will help to stabilise New Delhi's ties with Beijing besides bringing balance in Moscow's partnership with China. In November 2022, India's External Affairs Minister S. Jaishankar praised Russia as "exceptionally steady" and "time-tested" partner. In January 2023, Russian Foreign Ministry spokeswoman Maria Zakharova backed India in its dispute with British national broadcaster BBC over a documentary critical of Prime Minister Narendra Modi, stating this was part of an “information war” against “global centers of power pursuing an independent policy”.

After the start of the Russian invasion of Ukraine and because of international sanctions against Russia, it started to provide oil and chemical fertilisers at discounted rate to India, increasing India-Russia bilateral trade volume from $13 billion [2021-2022] to $27 billion within 2022 making it the largest oil and fertiliser supplier to India. By 2023, their trade was expected to cross $30 billion. India has also refused to accept the price cap on Russian crude imposed by the Western world. However, former CIA director William J. Burns has said that Indian PM Narendra Modi's words with Russian president Vladimir Putin has helped averting the nuclear war threat from Russia.

Russia's new foreign policy concept after the start of its invasion of Ukraine proposes to deepen its relations with India and China as a counterweight to the West, but Beijing and New Delhi have their own unique policies. In the first two decades of the 21st century, the balance of power in the China-Russia alliance has reversed, relations between China and India gradually deteriorated. China is now the senior partner, whereas Russia is further diminished by the quagmire in Ukraine, and Moscow even rejects the validity of the term Indo-Pacific. Some views believe that Putin's acceleration closer to China makes “[India-Russia] relationship is going down from being a very high-value strategic partnership to a transactional one”. India has also stepped up "Multi-Alignment Strategy" to mitigate the negative impact of the deepening of China-Russia relations.

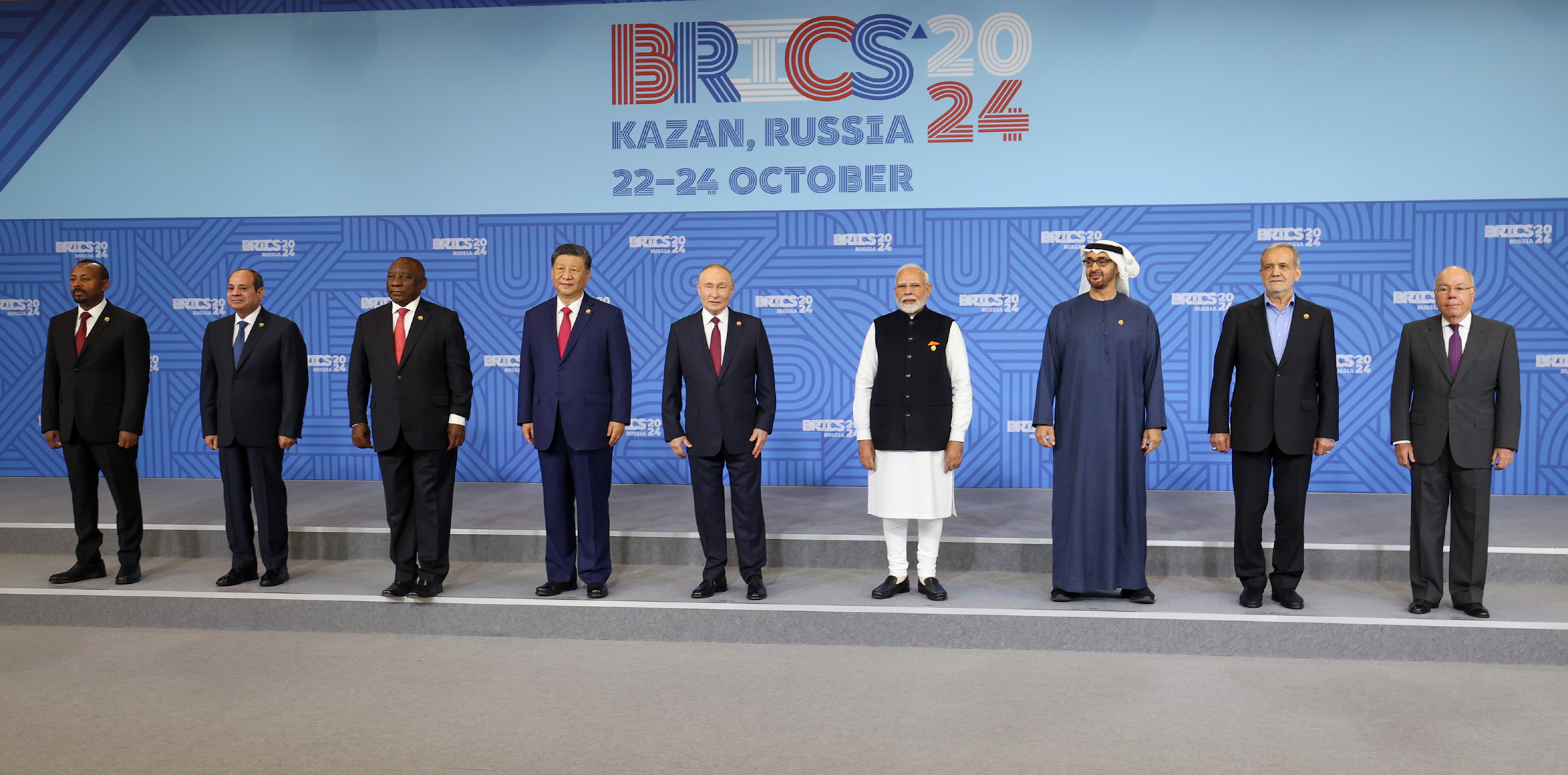
Vladimir Putin and Narendra Modi at the 16th BRICS summit in Kazan, Russia, 23 October 2024

In June 2023, an event at India's embassy in Moscow called "Namaste Moscow" was held to facilitate cultural exchange between India and Russia. In August 2023, the embassy held celebrations commemorating 76 years since Indian independence.

In December 2023, India's External Affairs Minister S. Jaishankar met Putin and Foreign Minister Sergey Lavrov over a five-day visit, praising the two countries' "all-time high" trading volume, praising the trade as "balanced", "sustainable" and providing "fair market access".

In July 2024, Prime Minister Modi visited Moscow to meet Putin, his first visit to Russia in five years. The two embraced as Modi climbed out of his car; this act was criticized by Ukrainian president Volodymyr Zelenskyy as it happened on the same day that Russian missiles struck a children's hospital in Kyiv. During the visit, the two countries discussed nine strategic areas for closer economic cooperation, including nuclear energy and medicine, with a goal to significantly improve bilateral trade by 2030.

In 2025, several top U.S. officials and political figures have accused India of effectively financing Russia’s war in Ukraine by serving as a major buyer of Russian energy. In late 2025, the United States, European Union, and United Kingdom significantly escalated sanctions against Russia's two largest oil producers, Rosneft and Lukoil, to curtail the financing of the war in Ukraine. These measures have significantly disrupted India's oil trade, leading to a sharp decline in imports from these specific entities. Putin visited New Delhi on 4–5 December 2025 for the 23rd India-Russia Annual Summit, hosted by Modi.

=== IRIGC ===
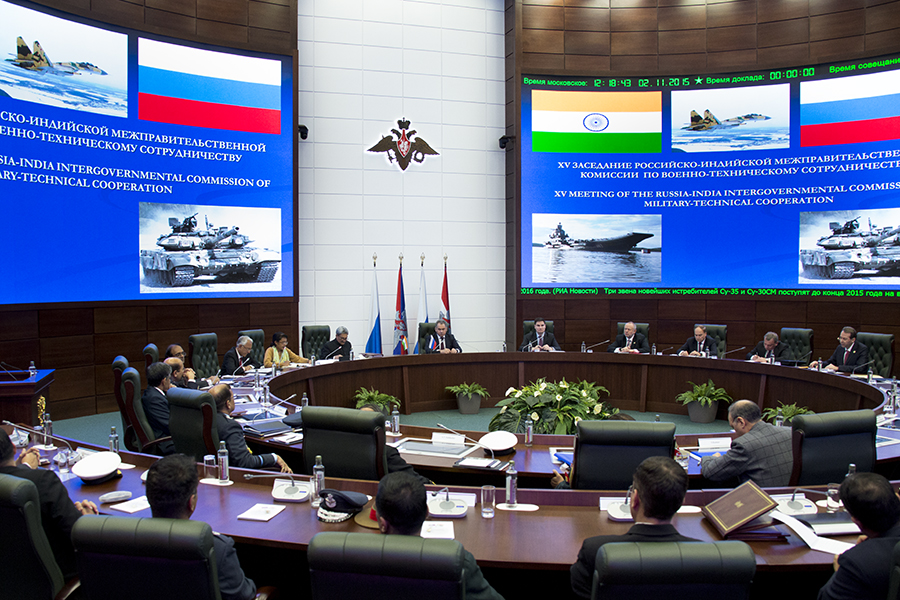
A meeting of the Russian-Indian intergovernmental commission on military and technical cooperation

The Indo-Russian Inter-Governmental Commission (IRIGC) is the main body that conducts affairs at the governmental level between both countries. Some have described it as the steering committee of India–Russia relations. It is divided into two parts, the first covering Trade, Economic, Scientific, Technological and Cultural Cooperation. This is normally co-chaired by the Russian Deputy Prime Minister and the Indian External Affairs Minister. The second part of the commission covers Military Technical Cooperation; this is co-chaired by the two countries respective Defence Ministers. Both parts of IRIGC meet annually.

In addition, to the IRIGC there are other bodies that conduct economic relations between the two countries. These include, the India-Russia Forum on Trade and Investment, the India-Russia Business Council, the India-Russia Trade, Investment and Technology Promotion Council and the India-Russia Chamber of Commerce. An article penned by Vladimir Putin was published in The Times of India on 30 May 2017, a day before Prime Minister Narendra Modi's visit to Russia, to mark the 70th anniversary of the establishment of relations between India and the Russia on 13 April 1947.

== Diplomatic missions ==
India has an embassy at Moscow and 4 consulates (listed west to east) at Saint Petersburg, Kazan (opened in November 2025), Yekaterinburg (opened in November 2025), and Vladivostok.

Russia has an embassy at New Delhi; 3 consulates at Kolkata, Mumbai, and Chennai; and 2 honorary consulates at Hyderabad and Goa,

== Military relations ==
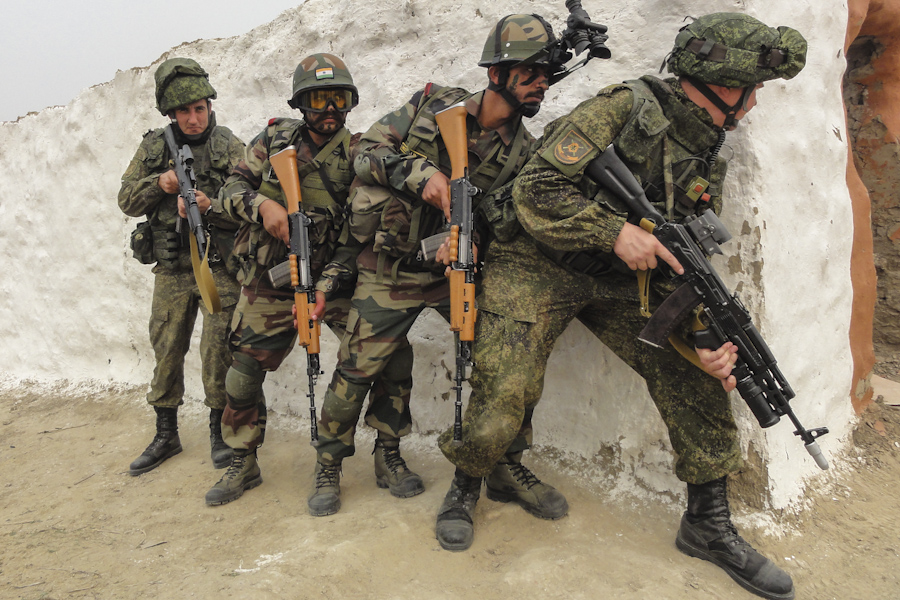
Indian and Russian soldiers training during the Indra 2015 counter-terrorism exercise.

The Soviet Union was an important supplier of defence equipment for several decades, and this role has been inherited by the Russian Federation. Between 2012 and 2016, Russia accounts for 68% of India's defence imports, and India and Russia have deepened their Make in India defence manufacturing cooperation by signing agreements for the construction of naval frigates, KA-226T twin-engine utility helicopters (joint venture (JV) to make 60 in Russia and 140 in India), Brahmos cruise missile (JV with 50.5% India and 49.5% Russia). Between 2013 and 2018, Russia accounted for 62% of arms sales to India. According to the SIPRI, Russia was the largest supplier of arms to India in both 2013–17 and 2018–22, but its share of total Indian arms imports fell from 64% to 45% while France emerged as the second largest supplier between 2018 and 2022.

In 1997, Russia and India signed a ten-year agreement for further military-technical cooperation encompassing a wide range of activities, including the purchase of completed weaponry, joint development and production, and joint marketing of armaments and military technologies. The cooperation is not limited to a buyer-seller relationship, but includes joint research and development, training, service to service contacts, including joint exercises. The last joint naval exercises took place in April 2007 in the Sea of Japan and joint airborne exercises were held in September 2007 in Russia. An Inter-Governmental commission on military-technical cooperation is co-chaired by the defence ministers of the two countries. The seventh session of this Inter-Governmental Commission was held in October 2007 in Moscow. During the visit, an agreement on joint development and production of prospective multi-role fighters was signed between the two countries. In 2009, India and Russia renewed a defence cooperation pact started in the Soviet era, which resulted in the sale of a multitude of defence equipment to India and also the emergence of the countries as development partners as opposed to purely a buyer-seller relationship, including the joint ventures projects to develop and produce the Fifth Generation Fighter Aircraft (FGFA) and the Multirole Transport Aircraft (MTA). In 2012, both countries signed a defence deal worth $2.9 billion during President Putin's visit to India for the 42 new Sukhois to be produced under license by defence PSU Hindustan Aeronautics, which will add to the 230 Sukhois earlier contracted from Russia. However, India finally withdrew from the joint stealth fighter project with Russia's Sukhoi in 2018.

In October 2018, India signed a historic agreement worth US$5.43 billion with Russia to procure five units of the S-400 Triumf surface-to-air missile defence systems, one of the best missile defence system in the world ignoring America's CAATSA act. The United States threatened India with sanctions over India's decision to buy the S-400 missile defence system from Russia.

India and Russia have several major joint military programmes including:

- BrahMos cruise missile programme
- Sukhoi Su-30MKI programme (230+ to be built by Hindustan Aeronautics)
- KA-226T twin-engine utility helicopters
- Numerous frigates

Additionally, India has purchased/leased various military hardware from Russia:

- S-400 Triumf
- Kamov Ka-226 200 to be made in India under the Make in India initiative.
- T-90S Bhishma with over 1000 to be built in India
- Akula-II nuclear submarine (2 to be leased with an option to buy when the lease expires)
- INS Vikramaditya aircraft carrier programme
- Tu-160 bombers (planned, not delivered)
- US$900 million upgrade of MiG-29
- Mil Mi-17 (80 ordered) more in Service.
- Ilyushin Il-76 Candid (6 ordered to fit Israeli Phalcon radar)
- The Farkhor Air Base in Tajikistan is currently jointly operated by Indian Air Force and Tajikistan Air Force.

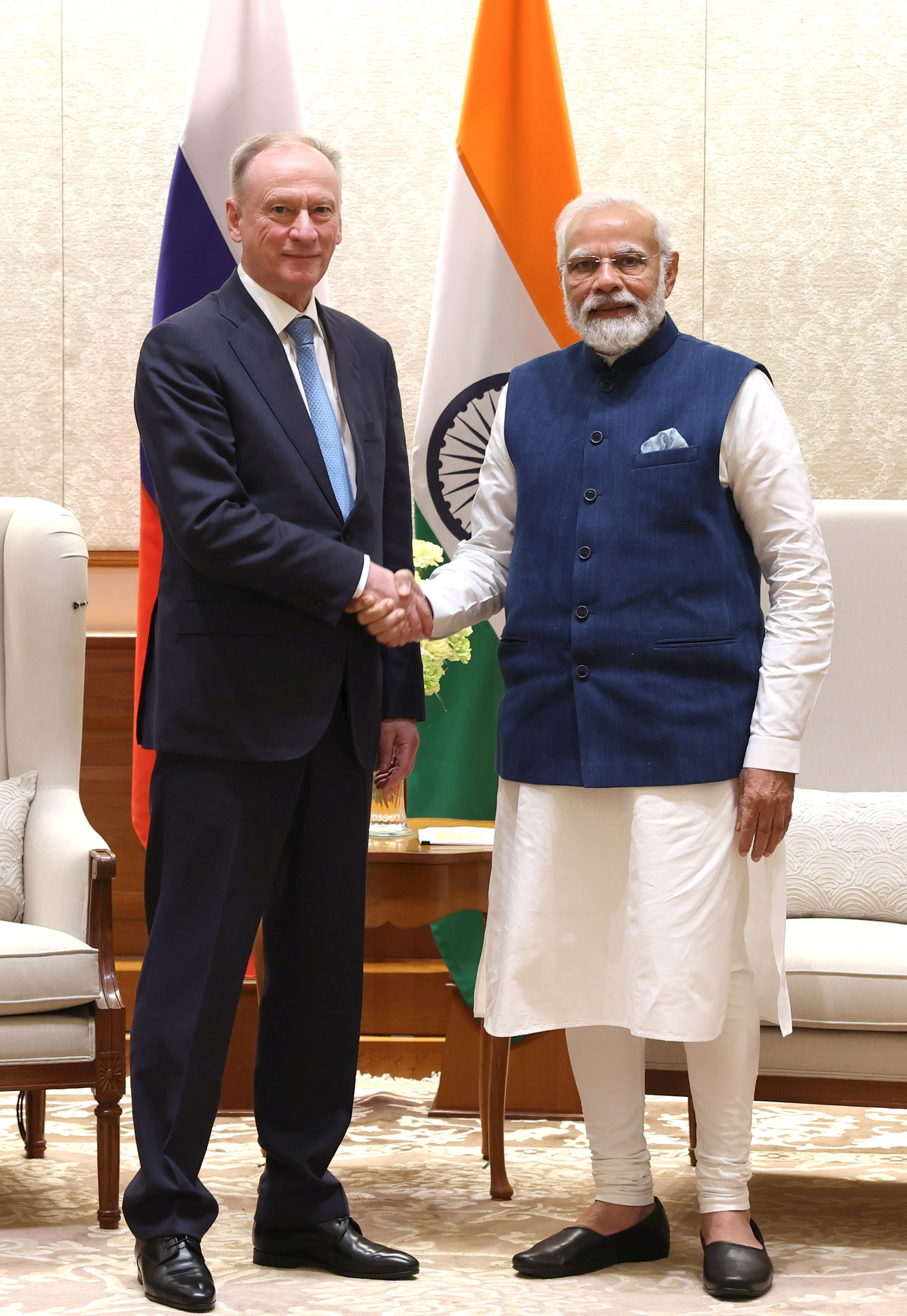
The secretary of Russia's Security Council, Nikolai Patrushev, and Indian prime minister Narendra Modi in New Delhi on 29 March 2023

=== Russia-Ukraine War ===
Russia said that despite the ongoing conflict with Ukraine, which caused international sanctions, it fulfilled its contractual obligations and delivered all weapon systems, including the S-400 air defence system, according to schedule. Also, Moscow said that they expect that serial production of AK-203 assault rifles in India will begin in late 2022-early 2023. Dmitry Shugaev, head of the Federal Service for Military Technical Cooperation (FSMTC), said that the Russian side was ready for cooperation and had already submitted proposals on the joint development and production of modern types of military equipment and actively uses the principle of "Make In India". At the Army-2022 forum, the Russian side declared its readiness for cooperation and presented proposals for the joint development and production of modern types of military equipment, namely, "the main battle tank of the future, infantry fighting vehicle, fifth-generation aircraft, diesel-electric submarines and other types of modern weapons." Russian president Vladimir Putin attended the Vostok-2022 military exercise in the Russian Far East. Beyond Russian troops, the exercises also included military forces from India, among others. In 2023, Russia and India planned to hold several joint military exercises. Exercises were held in the Southern Military District as part of the Indra military project, which was first implemented back in 2003. For the coming year, the countries have also planned to hold an event "AviaIndra".

On 18 October 2022, the Director-General of the Indian-Russian organisation BrahMos informed Russian journalists about the timing of the test of the BrahMos NG missile being developed as part of a joint project. According to him, "missile tests are scheduled for 2024." At the moment, design engineers are working on a scheme of weapons. The defence of the project, as the chief director expects, should take place in Moscow at the site of the NPO Mashinostroeniya.

In 2023, Russia planned to supply India with the frigate "Tushil" and the frigate "Tamala" of project 11356, created at the Baltic shipyard "Yantar". Initially, they were built for the Russian Navy, but due to Ukraine's refusal to provide engines, the ships are being prepared for the Indian side. The frigate "Tushil" was launched in October 2021, "Tamala", according to the plan will be launched at the end of 2022. In a deal signed on 7 March 2025, India acquired advanced 1,000 HP engines for its Soviet-era T-72 tanks, enhancing its battlefield capabilities. The deal also included technology transfer to India for domestic production. Despite the ongoing Ukraine war, Russia remained a key defence supplier to India.

India–US talks on Russian oil import waivers In April 2026, India expressed expectations that the United States would extend a waiver allowing continued purchases of Russian oil, according to government sources.

In September 2026, Prime Minister Modi and President Putin met in New Delhi on the eve of the 18th BRICS summit. The two leaders discussed bilateral relations and the effects of the war in Ukraine on maritime trade, while reaffirming their countries' strategic partnership. India continued to import substantial quantities of Russian oil despite pressure from the United States to reduce such purchases. The 18th BRICS summit, held in New Delhi on 12–13 September 2026, attracted attention for its treatment of the Russian invasion of Ukraine. Unlike the 2024 Kazan and 2025 Rio de Janeiro declarations, the New Delhi Declaration made no specific reference to the war in Ukraine, despite addressing several other international conflicts and crises.

== Economic relations ==
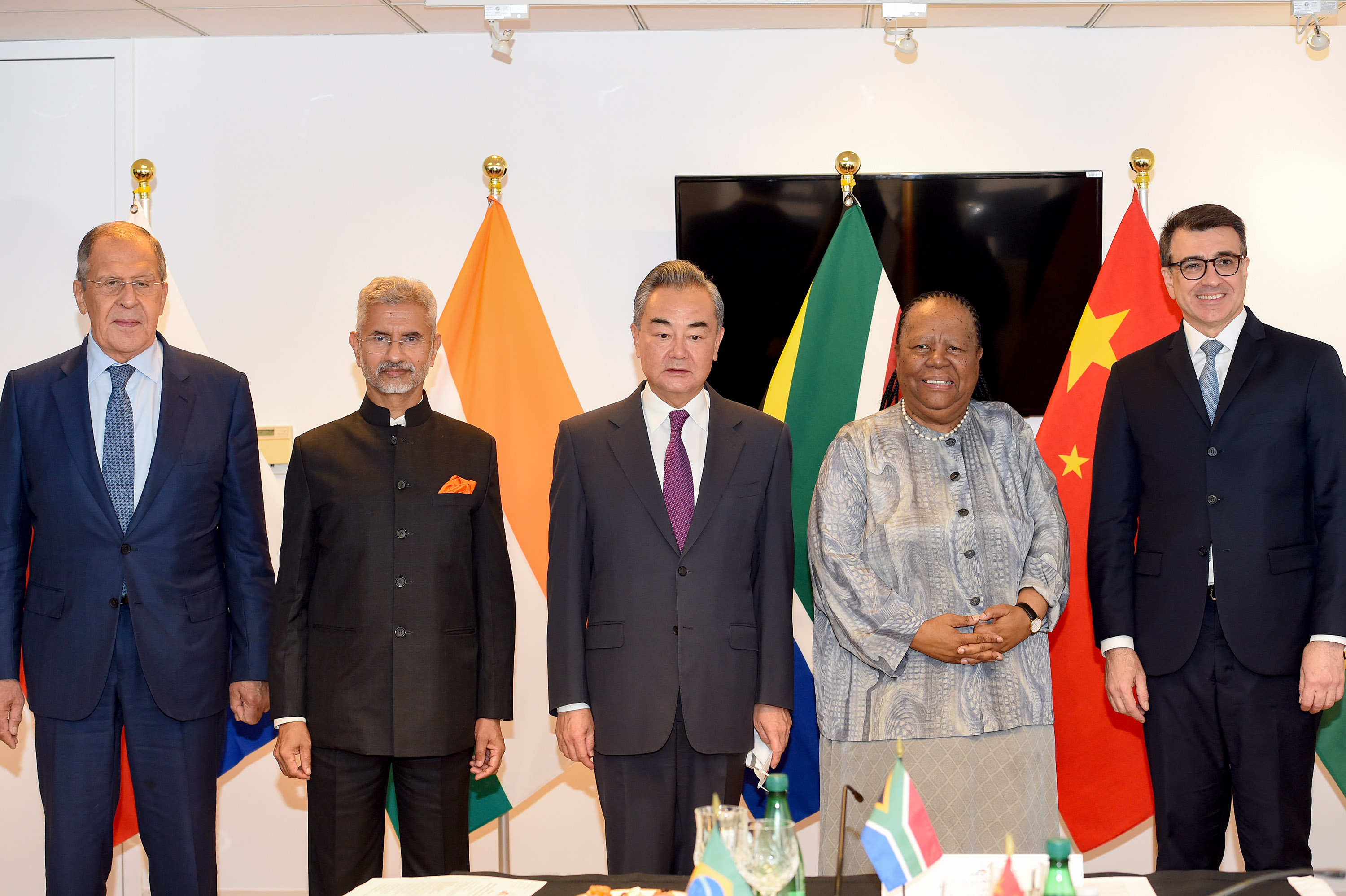
Meeting of BRICS (Brazil, Russia, India, China, South Africa) foreign ministers in New York City on 22 September 2022

Bilateral bodies that conduct economic relations between the two countries include IRIGC, the Indo-Russian Forum on Trade and Investment, the India-Russia Business Council, the India-Russia Trade, Investment and Technology Promotion Council, the India-Russia CEOs' Council and the India-Russia Chamber of Commerce.

Both governments have jointly developed an economic strategy that involves using a number of economic components to increase future bilateral trade. These include development of an FTA between India and the EEU, a bilateral treaty on the promotion and protection of investments, a new economic planning mechanism built into IRIGC, simplification of customs procedures, new long-term agreements in the expansion of energy trade including nuclear, oil and gas. Finally, long-term supplier contracts in key sectors such as oil, gas and rough diamonds. Companies such as Rosneft, Gazprom, Essar and Alrosa will act as long term suppliers respectively.

Russia and India are successfully cooperating in the banking sector. In 2010, the Russian Federation opened an office of Sberbank in New Delhi. Last year, the branch was capitalized and by now the equity of the branch has reached $100 million. In 2022, Russia received permission from the banking regulator in India to open a second office in Mumbai. On 2 August 2022, the Russian ambassador to India announced the Indian side's interest in presence in the Russian market, in particular, Indian pharmaceutical products, leather goods, textiles and agricultural goods. The countries plan to implement the project in 2023.

Both the countries set the investment target of $30 billion by 2025. Since they met the target by 2018, India and Russia expect to enhance the figure to $50 billion. India also proposed to set up a special economic zone for Russian companies.

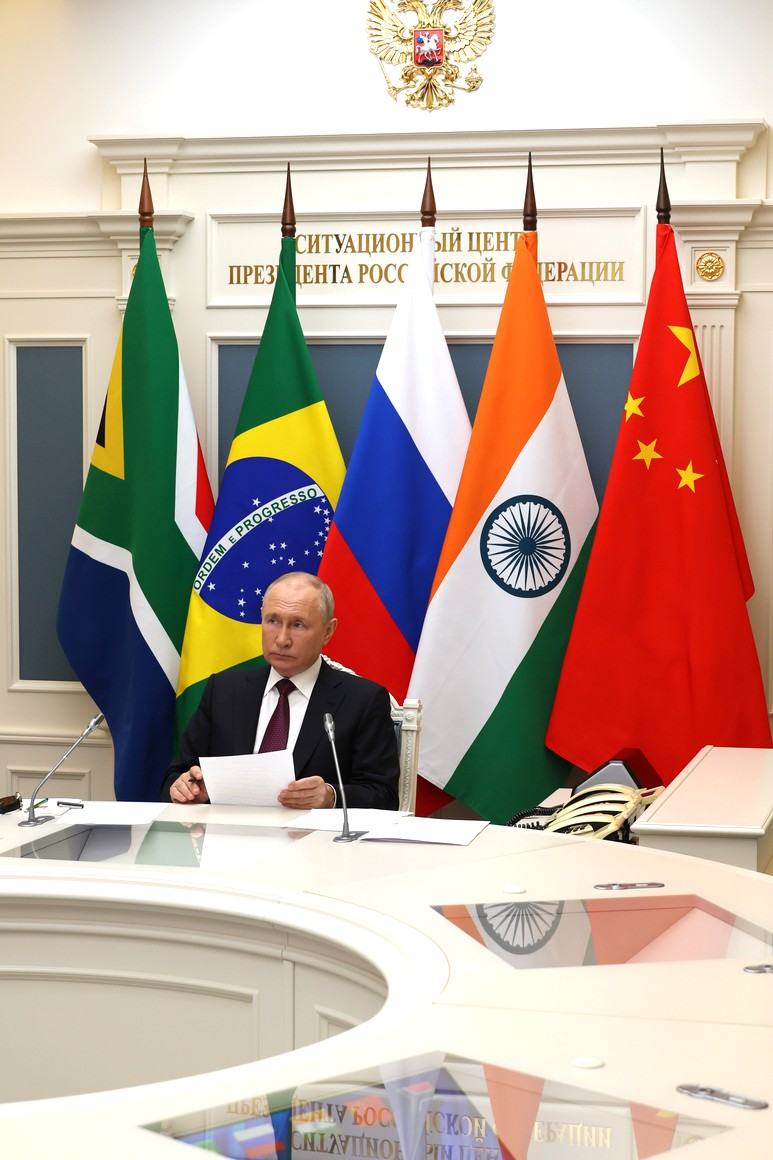
Putin addresses participants of the 15th BRICS summit held in South Africa via a video link in Moscow, 24 August 2023

In March 2022, when Western nations imposed economic sanctions on Russia in the aftermath of its invasion of Ukraine, India and Russia explored alternative payment systems due to exclusion of most Russian banks from SWIFT and Visa/Mastercard. Officials from both countries were discussing accepting RuPay and MIR cards. The Reserve Bank of India and the Bank of Russia seek to facilitate financial transactions through an independent rupee-ruble exchange system, particularly for the purchase of sunflower oil by India, and the export of petroleum products and fertilizers by the Russian Federation. India also depends crucially on Russia for its defence equipment and parts. Additionally, Indian Oil Corp. had reportedly reached a deal to buy 3 million barrels of oil from Russia's Rosneft at a 20% discount to global prices.

Due to India simplifying recent visa rule changes for Russians travelling to India, the number of tourists increased by over 22%. In 2011 the Indian consulates in Moscow, Vladivostok and St. Petersburg issued 160,000 visas, an increase of over 50% compared to 2010. Officials from both countries have discussed how to increase cooperation between their countries respective IT industries. Russian Minister of Communication Nikolai Nikiforov stated in an interview, "The development of IT products and software has traditionally been a strong point of India. We welcome possible joint projects in the field and closer contacts between Russian and Indian companies."

In 2024 as Russia needed more human resources, Russia's First Deputy PM Denis Manturov announced at the 25th India-Russia Intergovernmental Commission session, that India and Russia are in discussion to prepare Indian workers with skills through Russian vocational training programs to facilitate their future employment in Russian companies. “India is now the second country among all the foreign economic partners of Russia. The positive tendency is maintained this year as well,” he said.

=== Russian cooperation and Make In India Initiative ===
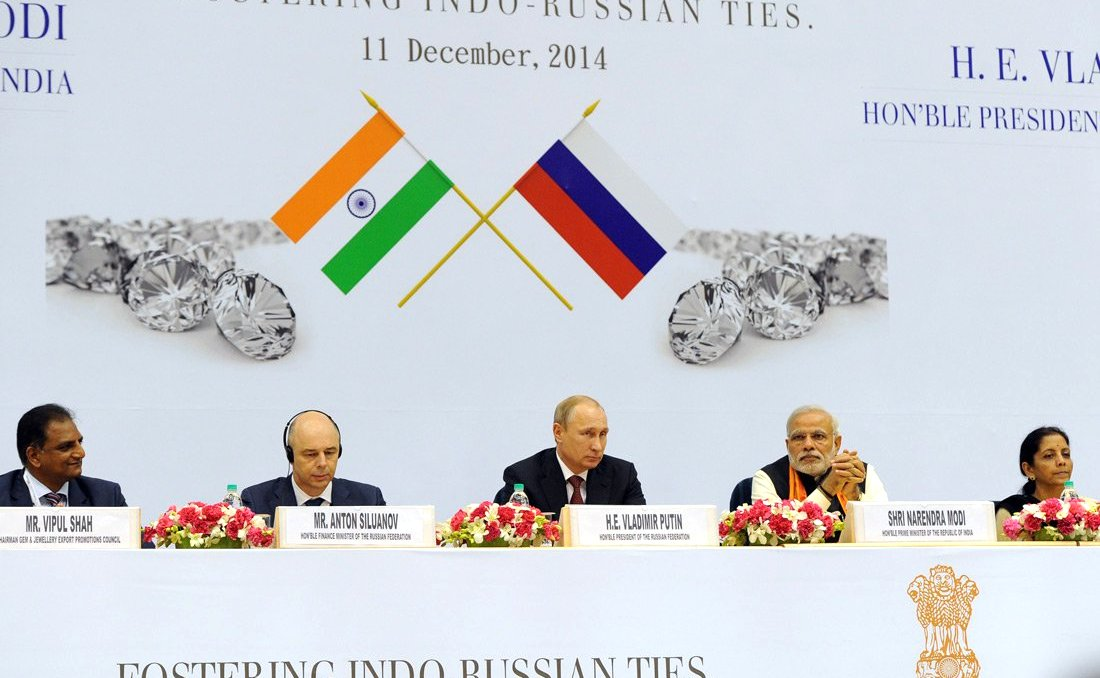
Prime Minister Modi and President Putin at the World Diamond Conference in New Delhi in 2014

India is currently the world's largest cutting & polishing centre for diamonds. Both countries have agreed to streamline their bilateral trade in diamonds through reductions in regulations and tariffs. Indian Prime Minister Modi stated in an interview, "I made three proposals to President Putin. First, I would like Alrosa to have direct long-term contracts with more Indian companies. I am pleased to know that they are moving in this direction. Second, I want Alrosa and others to trade directly on our diamond bourse. We have decided to create a Special Notified Zone where mining companies can trade diamonds on consignment basis and re-export unsold ones. Third, I asked to reform regulation so that Russia can send rough diamonds to India and re-import polished diamonds without extra duties". Analysts predict through streamlined procedures and initiatives bilateral trade in this area will significantly increase.

Russia has stated it will cooperate with India on its "Make in India" initiative by engagement in the development of "Smart Cites", the DMIC, the aerospace sector, the commercial nuclear sector and enhancement in manufacturing of Russian military products through co-development and co-production. Russia agreed to participate in the vast, over $100 billion, DMIC infrastructure project which will eventually connect Delhi and Mumbai with railways, highways, ports, interconnecting smart cities and industrial parks. Russian President Vladimir Putin stated in an interview that one of his government's priorities was of building a smart city in India, "a smart city on the basis of Russian technologies." AFK Sistema will likely be the primary Russian company involved in the project due to its previous experience in smart city projects in Ufa, Kazan and Rostov.

Both countries have also agreed to work together in the aerospace sector to co-develop and co-produce aircraft, examples include the Sukhoi Superjet 100, MS-21, FGFA, MTA and Kamov Ka-226. Some of the co-developed aircraft will be jointly commercially exported to third countries and foreign markets e.g. FGFA and Kamov Ka-226. President of Russia's UAC Mikhail Pogosyan stated in an interview, "We are planning to sell in India about 100 passenger aircraft by 2030, which will account for 10 percent of the Indian market of airliners in the segment" and further stated, "The unprecedented scope of Russian-Indian cooperation in military aviation has created a scientific and engineering basis for undertaking joint projects in civil aviation."

=== Cooperation in the energy sector ===
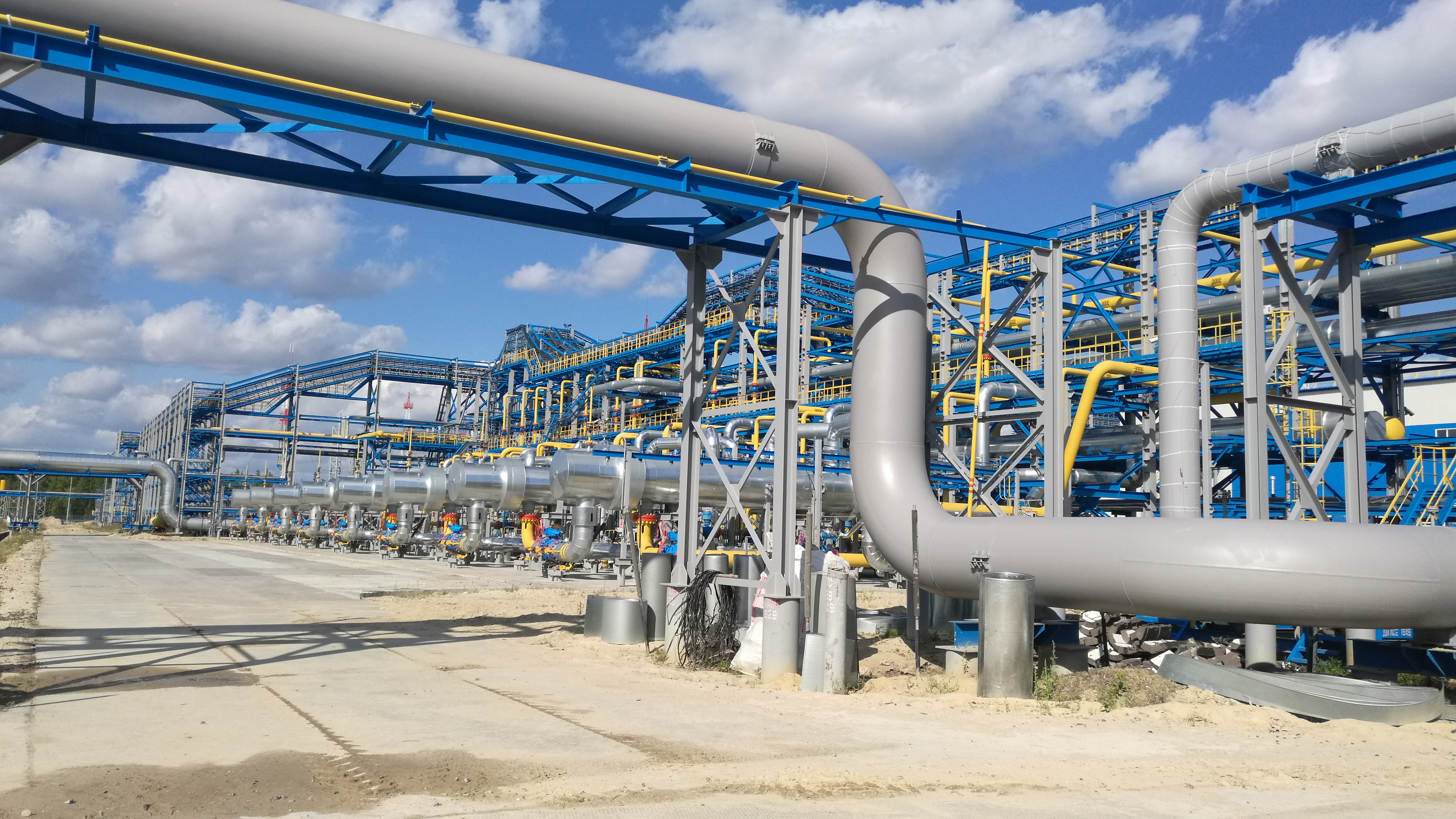
In 2023, Russia was the largest oil supplier to India with a 40% share.

The energy sector is an important area in Indian–Russian bilateral relations. In 2001, ONGC-Videsh acquired 20% stake in the Sakhalin-I oil and gas project in the Russian Federation, and invested about US$1.7 billion in the project. Gazprom, the Russian company, and Gas Authority of India have collaborated in joint development of a block in the Bay of Bengal. Kudankulam Nuclear Power Project with two units of 1000 MW each is a good example of Indian–Russian nuclear energy cooperation. Both sides have expressed interest in expanding cooperation in the energy sector. In December 2008, Russia and India signed an agreement to build civilian nuclear reactors in India during a visit by the Russian president to New Delhi.

In 2012 Gazprom Group and India's GAIL agreed to LNG shipments to India of 2.5 million tons a year for the period of 20 years. LNG shipments for this contract are expected to begin anytime between 2017 and 2021. Indian oil companies have invested in Russia's oil sector, a notable example is ONGC-Videsh which has invested over $8 billion with major stakes in oil fields such as Sakhalin-1. In a joint statement released by both governments they stated, "It is expected that Indian companies will strongly participate in projects related to new oil and gas fields in the territory of the Russian Federation. The sides will study the possibilities of building a hydrocarbon pipeline system, connecting the Russian Federation with India."

During the Russian invasion of Ukraine, India imported a lot of discounted Russian oil, Russia rose to become India's second biggest supplier of oil in May, pushing Saudi Arabia into third place but still behind Iraq which remains No. 1, data from trade sources showed, accounts for 18% of India's crude imports. Indian energy reliance on Russia increased, as imports of Russian liquid gas, crude oil and coal tripled to almost US$5 billion in the first half of 2022. After January 2023, Russia has become India's top oil supplier, replacing Iraq. India's oil imports from Russia rose for the 5th straight month in November, accounting for 23% of India's overall import of 4 million bpd oil. This was 4% higher than imports from Russia in October.

Russia has agreed to build more than 20 nuclear reactors over the next 20 years. The Russian president stated in an interview, "It contains plans to build over 20 nuclear power units in India, as well as cooperation in building Russia-designed nuclear power stations in third countries, in the joint extraction of natural uranium, production of nuclear fuel and waste elimination." In June 2025, a majority of U.S. senators supported secondary sanctions against Russia that would impose 500% tariffs on countries that buy Russian oil, natural gas, uranium and other exports. India is one of the main consumers of Russian energy.

In early 2026, Reuters reported that several of India’s largest oil refineries had halted purchases of Russian crude scheduled for loading in March and April, according to sources familiar with the matter. The report said the move coincided with New Delhi’s efforts to move closer to a trade agreement with the United States. During the same period, Indian refiners reportedly increased crude imports from the Middle East, Africa, and South America.

=== Bilateral trade ===
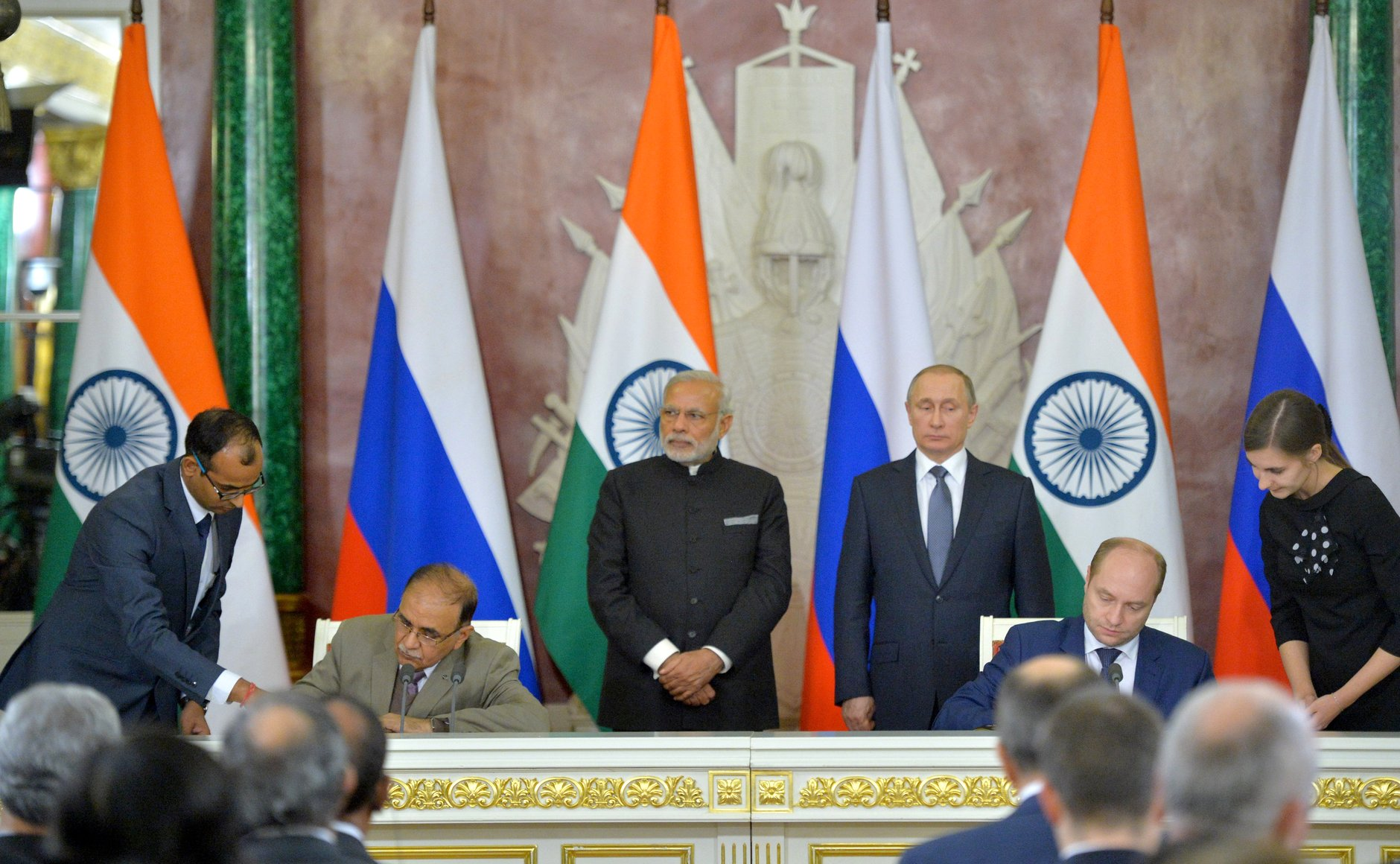
Signing of Indian-Russian documents at the 2015 Indian–Russian summit in Moscow.

Bilateral trade between both countries is concentrated in key value chain sectors. These sectors include highly diversified segments such as machinery, electronics, aerospace, automobile, commercial shipping, chemicals, pharmaceuticals, fertilisers, apparels, precious stones, industrial metals, petroleum products, coal, high-end tea and coffee products.

Bilateral trade in 2002 stood at $1.5 billion and increased by over 7 times to $11 billion in 2012, in just five months after 2022 impact, bilateral trade between Russia and India reached a record growth of $18.229 billion. For comparison, last year this figure amounted to $13.124 billion, and the year before that – $8.141 billion during pandemic. Now Russia has become India's seventh largest trading partner, having risen to this place from the 25th position it occupied last year. Russia's share in India's total trade volume increased to 3.54% compared to 1.27% in 2021–2022, and with this strong trend, both governments setting a bilateral money target of over $30 billion by 2025.

=== Chennai–Vladivostok Maritime Corridor ===
India is looking in the Arctic and discussed wide-ranging cooperation in the Northern and Eastern parts between the two countries. "The Eastern Maritime Corridor between Vladivostok and Chennai is operational now. Container ships carrying crude oil, metal and textile have started coming to Indian ports," Sonowal told reporters in 2024. The time taken will come down to 16–24 days compared to more than 40 to transport goods.

=== North–South Transport Corridor ===
The North–South Transport Corridor is the ship, rail, and road route for moving freight between India, Russia, Iran, Europe and Central Asia. The route primarily involves moving freight from India, Iran, Azerbaijan and Russia via ship, rail and road. The objective of the corridor is to increase trade connectivity between major cities such as Mumbai, Moscow, Tehran, Baku, Bandar Abbas, Astrakhan, Bandar Anzali etc. Dry runs of two routes were conducted in 2014, the first was Mumbai to Baku via Bandar Abbas and the second was Mumbai to Astrakhan via Bandar Abbas, Tehran and Bandar Anzali. The objective of the study was to identify and address key bottlenecks. The results showed transport costs were reduced by "$2,500 per 15 tons of cargo". Other routes under consideration include via Armenia, Kazakhstan and Turkmenistan. On 5 September 2019, India pledged a USD 1 billion line of credit (concessional loans) for the development of Russia's far east.

Russian imports from India amounted to $3.1 billion or 1% of its overall imports, and 0.7% of India's overall exports in 2014. The 10 major commodities exported from India to Russia were:

Indian commodities exports to Russia (2014)
Product category	Quantity ($ million)
Pharmaceuticals	$819.1
Electronic equipment	$382.3
Machines, engines, pumps	$159.4
Iron and steel	$149.1
Clothing (not knit or crochet)	$135.7
Coffee, tea and spices	$131.7
Tobacco	$113.9
Vehicles	$111.1
Knit or crochet clothing	$97.9
Other food preparations	$77.7

Russian exports to India amounted to $6.2 billion or 1.3% of its overall exports, and 0.9% of India's overall imports in 2014. The 10 major commodities exported from Russia to India were:

Russian commodities exports to India (2014)
Product category	Quantity ($ million)
Gems, precious metals, coins	$1100.0
Machines, engines, pumps	$707.4
Electronic equipment	$472.7
Fertilizers	$366.8
Medical, technical equipment	$302.7
Oil	$223.8
Iron and steel	$167.4
Paper	$136.8
Inorganic chemicals	$127.4
Salt, sulphur, stone, cement	$105.1

=== Free trade agreement ===
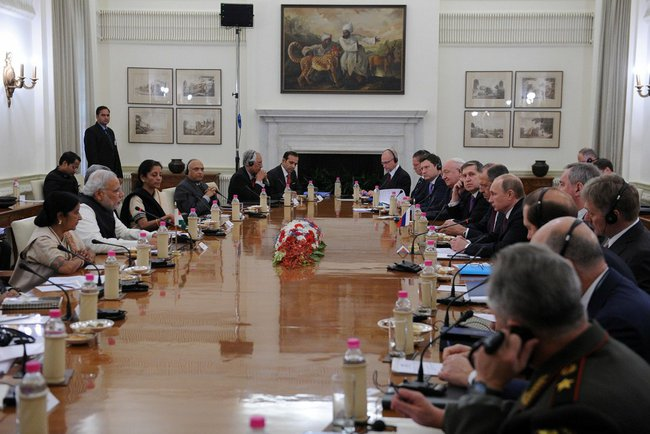
The formal process for the free trade agreement between India and the Eurasian Economic Union was begun at the 2014 Indian–Russian summit in New Delhi.

Both governments have long viewed their bilateral trade well below its optimal potential, with the only long term way of rectifying this through having a free trade agreement (FTA). Both governments have set up a joint study group (JSG) to negotiate the specifications of an agreement, a final agreement would be signed between India and Eurasian Economic Union of which Russia is a part of (also including Kazakhstan, Armenia, Kyrgyzstan & Belarus). Thereby, the Indian–Russian FTA would result in a much bigger free trade agreement including India, Russia, Kazakhstan, Armenia, Kyrgyzstan & Belarus. It is predicted once an FTA is in place bilateral trade will increase manifold, thereby significantly increasing the importance of economics in bilateral ties.

The table below shows the recent Indian–Russian bilateral trade performance:

Indian–Russian trade (2009–12)
Year	Trade Volume (Billion $)	Annual Change
2009	$7.46	
2010	$8.53	+14.34%
2011	$8.87	+3.98%
2012	$11.04	+24.50%

== Scientific relations ==
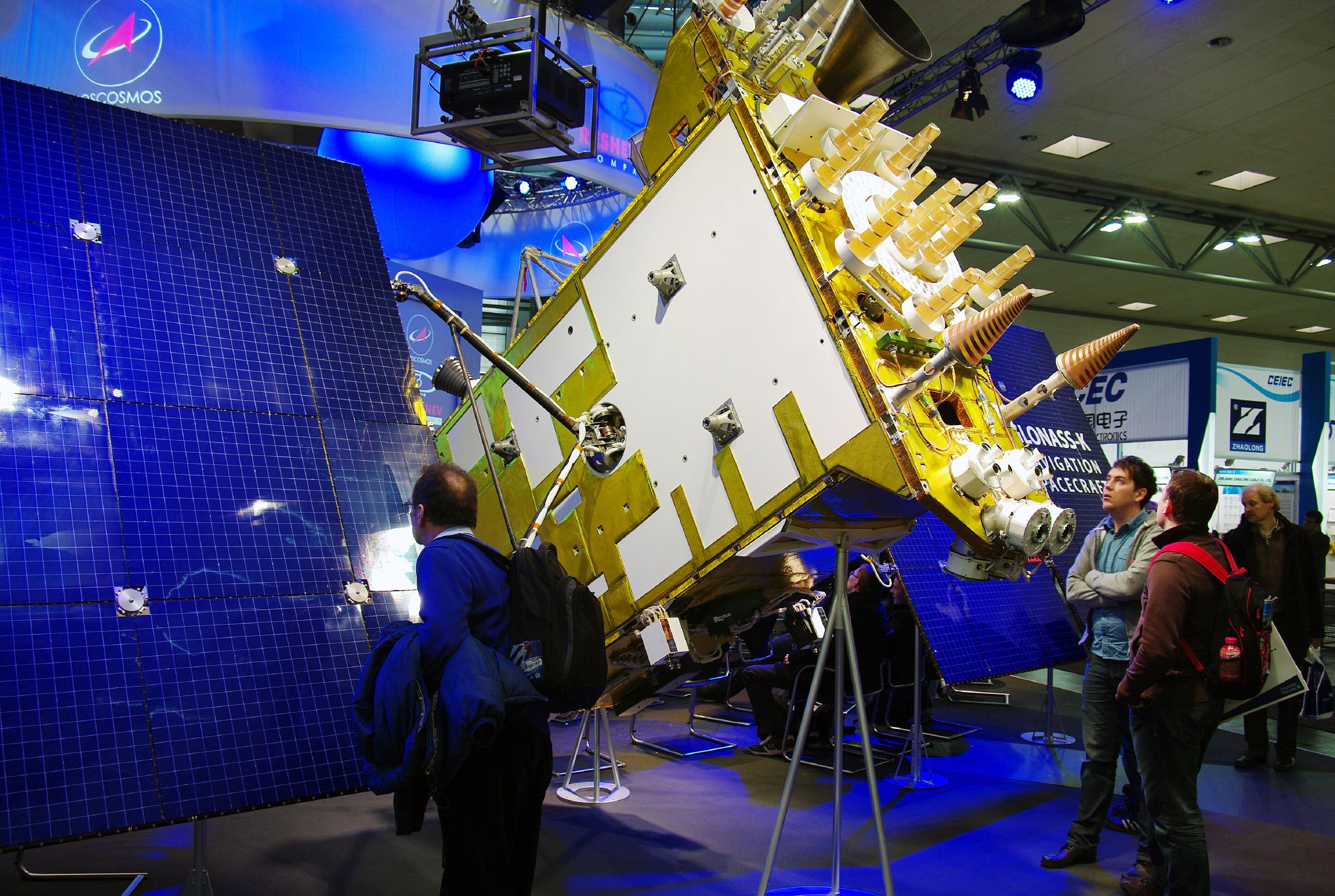
India and Russia have both signed agreements for the cooperation and use of GLONASS

The ongoing collaboration in the field of science & technology, under the Integrated Long-Term Programme of Co-operation (ILTP) is the largest cooperation programme in this sphere for both India and Russia. ILTP is coordinated by the Department of Science and Technology from the Indian side and by the Academy of Sciences, Ministry of Science and Education, and Ministry of Industry and Trade from the Russian side. Development of SARAS Duet aircraft, semiconductor products, super computers, poly-vaccines, laser science and technology, seismology, high-purity materials, software & IT and Ayurveda have been some of the priority areas of co-operation under the ILTP. Under this programme, eight joint Indian–Russian centres have been established to focus on joint research and development work. Two other Joint Centres on Non-Ferrous Metals and Accelerators and Lasers are being set up in India. A Joint Technology Centre based in Moscow to bring cutting-edge technologies to the market is also under processing. An ILTP Joint Council met in Moscow on 11–12 October 2007 to review co-operation and give it further direction. In August 2007, an MoU was signed between Department of Science and Technology and Russian Foundation of Basic Research, Moscow to pursue scientific co-operation.

In June 2010, the Russian-Indian Science and Technology Center (RISTC) was established in Moscow as a structure of effective innovative interaction in order to find forms of commercialization of the results of joint scientific and technical research. In April 2012, the official opening of the Delhi branch of the RISTC took place.

=== Space cooperation ===
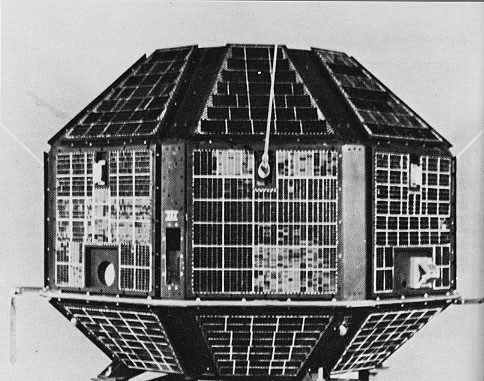
India's first Satellite Aryabhata was launched into space with the cooperation of the Soviet Union

There has been a long history of cooperation between the Soviet Union and India in space. Examples include Aryabhata, India's first satellite, named after an Indian astronomer of the same name. It was launched by the Soviet Union on 19 April 1975 from Kapustin Yar using a Kosmos-3M launch vehicle. The only Indian to visit space, Rakesh Sharma, was also launched by the Soviet Union under Interkosmos space program. During President Vladimir Putin's visit to India in December 2004, two space-related bilateral agreements were signed viz. Intergovernmental umbrella Agreement on cooperation in the outer space for peaceful purposes and the Inter-Space Agency Agreement on cooperation in the Russian satellite navigation system GLONASS. Subsequently, a number of follow-up agreements on GLONASS have been signed. In November 2007, the two countries have signed an agreement on joint lunar exploration. These space cooperation programmes are under implementation. Chandrayaan-2 was a joint lunar exploration mission proposed by the Indian Space Research Organisation (ISRO) and the Russian Federal Space Agency (RKA) and had a projected cost of ₹4.25 billion (US$90 million). The mission, proposed to be launched in 2017 by a Geosynchronous Satellite Launch Vehicle (GSLV), included a lunar orbiter and a rover made in India as well as one lander built by Russia. But due to the repeated delays in the joint venture, the Indian side ultimately decided to develop its own lander and borne all costs of the mission by itself. Later ISRO developed its own lander named Vikram and launched Chandrayaan-2 mission successfully on 22 July 2019, from SDSC SHAR, Sriharikota, Andhra Pradesh.

In December 2021, Russia and India signed an agreement on measures to protect technologies in the field of space. The two countries agreed to expand and strengthen partnership relations between the Russian Roscosmos and the Indian Space Research Organization, as well as cooperation in the field of crewed space programs and satellite navigation. In addition, Russia and India planned to explore the prospects for developing cooperation in the field of launch vehicle development and planetary exploration.

On 10 February 2020, Glavkosmos JSC and the Manned Space Flight Center of the Indian Space Research Organisation, within the framework of an agreement to provide India with assistance in preparing for the launch of astronauts, began training Indian Air Force pilots. Indian astronaut candidates have undergone physical and medical training, studied the Russian language, designs, layouts and systems of the Soyuz crewed transport spacecraft. On 22 March 2021, the head of Roscosmos, Dmitry Rogozin, announced the completion of the Indian cosmonaut training program.

In October 2022, Glavkosmos JSC supplied the Indian side with systems and equipment for the Gaganyaan crewed transport spacecraft, as well as individual equipment (spacesuits, armchairs and lodgments produced by the Russian JSC Zvezda Scientific and Production Enterprise) for Indian cosmonauts.

=== Nuclear deals ===
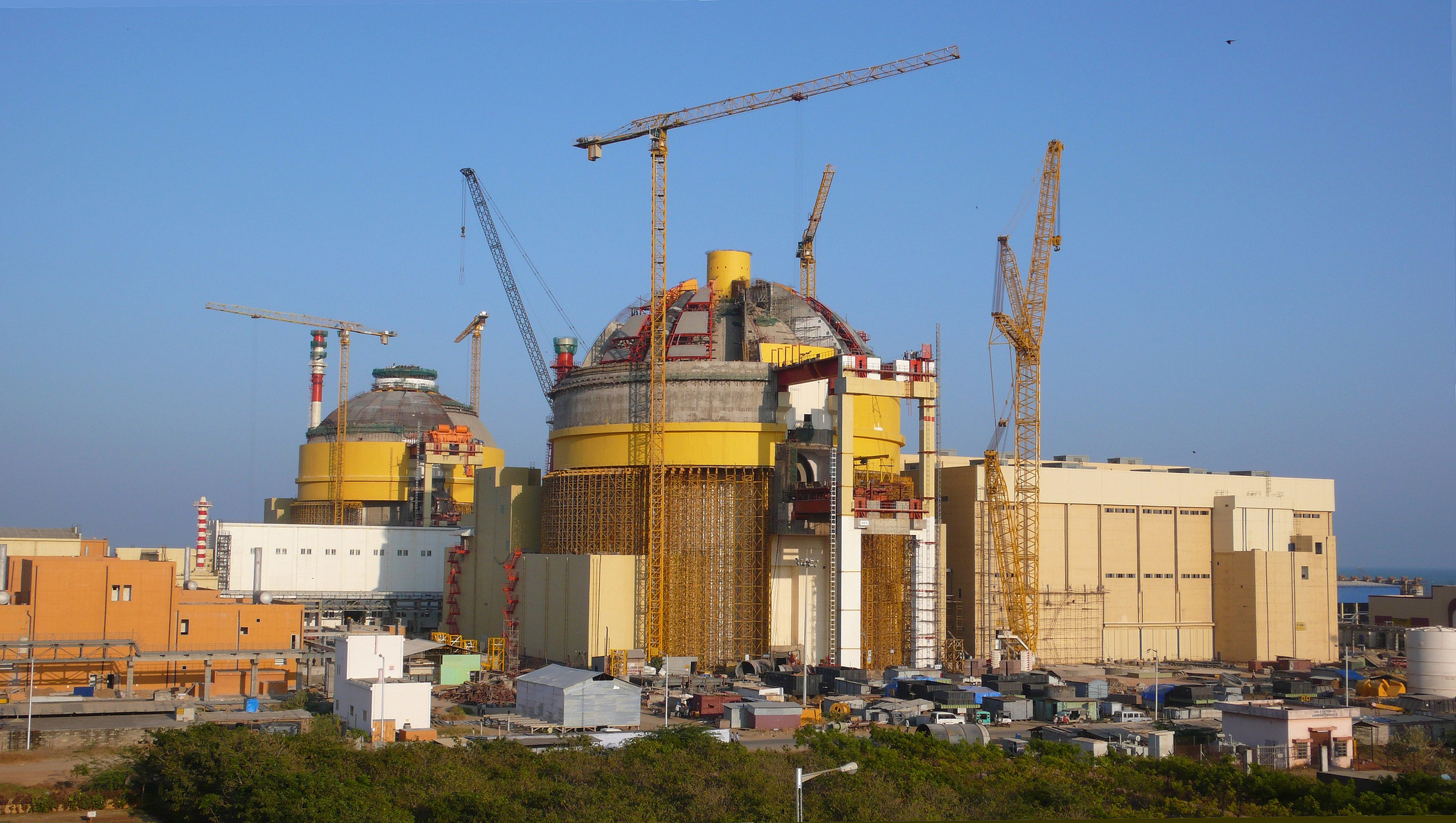
Construction of the Kudankulam Nuclear Power Plant in 2009

On 7 November 2009, India signed a new nuclear deal with Russia apart from the deals that were agreed upon by the two countries earlier. India and Russia are in discussion for construction of two more nuclear power units at Kudankulam. Two units of the Kudankulam Nuclear Power Plant are already operational. During Russian president Vladimir Putin's visit to India for the 13th annual summit, a cooperative civilian nuclear energy road map was agreed to. Running until 2030, sixteen to eighteen new reactors will be constructed, with installed capacity of 1,000 MW each. A 1,000 MW reactor costs around $2.5 billion so the deal may touch $45 billion in worth.

In November 2011, Russia and Bangladesh signed an inter-governmental agreement on cooperation in the construction of the first Bangladeshi NPP "Ruppur", consisting of two power units with Russian VVER type reactors with an electric capacity of 1200 MW each, the life cycle of which is 60 years, with the possibility of extension for another 20 years. On 23 December 2015, during the visit of Rosatom CEO Sergey Kiriyenko to Bangladesh, a general contract for the construction of the first Bangladeshi nuclear power plant was signed. At the beginning of 2017 Russia has provided India with a loan of $11.38 billion to finance the main stage of the NPP construction. The construction of the nuclear power plant began in 2021. Currently, work is underway on the first and second power units. Based on the latest schedule, the power units will be put into operation in February 2024 and at the end of the same year, respectively.

== Cultural relations ==
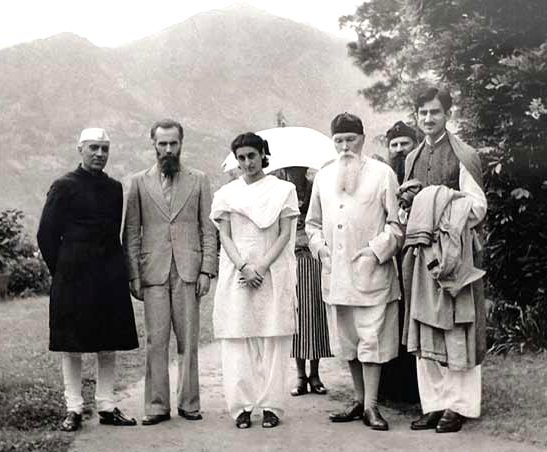
Nicholas Roerich with Jawaharlal Nehru and Indira Gandhi.

Indo–Russian relations in the field of culture are historical to limited extent. One of the first Russian visitors to India was Afanasiy Nikitin a merchant from Tver in Russia. His famous journey (1466–1472) was documented in the book A Journey Beyond the Three Seas. Nikitin spent three years in India (1469–1472) travelling to its many regions and documenting its people, economy, trade, agriculture and customs. Nikitin's journey was portrayed by Soviet actor Oleg Strizhenov alongside Hindi screen legend Nargis Dutt in the 1950s film Journey Beyond Three Seas.

Astrakhan in Russia has historically been a trading centre for Indian merchants since the 16th century. In 1722 Peter the Great met with Anbu Ram the leader of the Indians merchants in Astrakhan. In the meeting Peter the Great agreed to Anbu Ram's request for full free trade including transit rights. Russian pioneers who travelled to India and studied Indian culture include Gerasim Lebedev who studied ancient Indian languages in the 1780s and later Nicholas Roerich who studied Indian philosophy. Roerich was influenced by the philosophy of Ramakrishna and Vivekananda, the poetry of Rabindranath Tagore, and the Bhagavad Gita. The 130th birth anniversary of Nicholas Roerich and 100th birth anniversary of Svetoslav Roerich were celebrated in India in October 2004.

Leading Russian Indiologist such as Ivan Minayev, Sergey Oldenburg, Fyodor Shcherbatskoy, Yuri Knorozov, Alexandr Kondratov, Nikita Gurov and Eugene Chelyshev focused their research in understanding the Indus Script, Sanskrit and Indian literature.

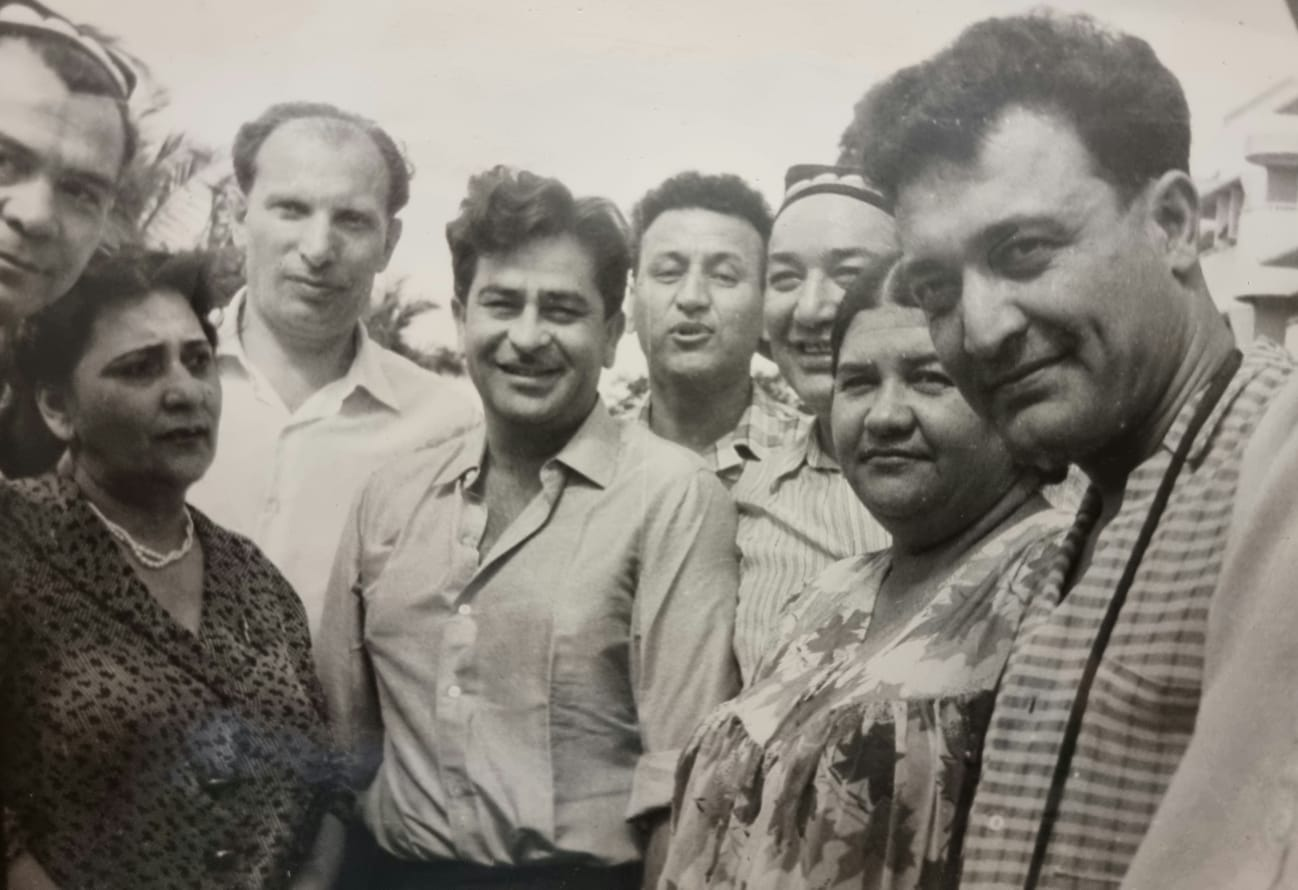
Raj Kapoor alongside a delegation of writers from the Soviet Union, 1950s, India

Traditionally, there has been strong collaboration in the field of cinema between India and the USSR. Several generations of Russians grew up watching subtitled Indian films (mainly Bollywood) and vice versa for Indians watching Russian films. Popular Indian films in the USSR included Awara, Bobby, Barood, Mamta and Disco Dancer. Recent contemporary films entirely shot in Russia include Lucky: No Time for Love. However, after the collapse of the USSR Bollywood's market share decreased in Russia. Recently, however, there has been increase due to viewers having access through cable and satellite channels. The Russian Deputy Minister of Culture, Elena Milovzorova, stated in an interview that an Indian-Russian joint working group (JWG) would discuss procedures to allow for both countries film industries to collaborate in film production together. The Krasnodar Region has been discussed among officials as a possible area for shooting future Bollywood films. In 2010, former Russian president Dmitry Medvedev, known to be an admirer of Bollywood films, visited the film set of Yash Raj Studios and met prominent Indian film personalities such as Yash Chopra, Shah Rukh Khan and Kareena Kapoor during his state visit to India. He stated in an interview, "Our country is one of the places where Indian culture is most admired" in addition stated, "Russia and India are the only countries where satellite channels broadcast Indian movies 24/7."

Yoga in Russia has been growing and becoming increasingly popular since the 1980s, particularly in majors cities and urban centres, mainly due to its reputation for health benefits. However, it has its roots much earlier in Russia during the time of noted Russian actor and trainer Constantin Stanislavski who was significantly influenced by Yoga and Indian philosophy.

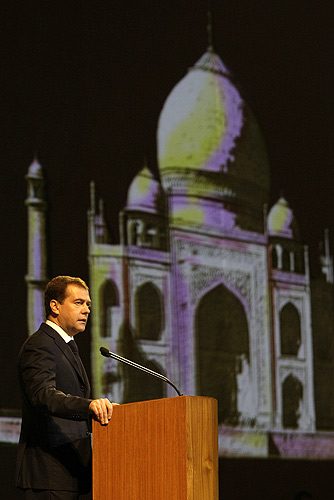
Russian president Dmitry Medvedev making his speech at the closing ceremony of The "Year of Russia in India" in 2008.

Russia's Rossotrudnichestvo Representative Office (RRO) established in 1965 has five Russian Centres of Science and Culture (RCSC) in India they include New Delhi, Mumbai, Kolkata, Chennai and Trivandrum. The head of RRO and director of RCSC, Fyodor Rozovsky, expects cultural ties to grow between both countries. He and other officials also expects the number of Indian students studying in Russia to increase once both countries sign an agreement on joint recognition of higher education diplomas. There is a Hindi Department, in the University of Moscow along with five Chairs relating to Indology in Moscow, Saint Petersburg, Kazan and Vladivostok.

Days of Russian Culture were held in India in November 2003, in Delhi, Kolkata and Mumbai. "Days of Indian Culture" in Russia were organised from September to October 2005 in Russia. Chief Minister of National Capital Territory of Delhi led a delegation for participating in the event "Days of Delhi in Moscow" from 28 May to 1 June 2006. The "Year of Russia in India" was held in 2008. It was followed by the "Year of India in Russia" in 2009. In the period from 2018 to 2019, the Indian Council for Cultural Relations (ICCR) signed a Memorandum of Understanding with the Russian organization ROSSCONCERT. The document opened the possibility for troupes of artists from both countries to visit India and Russia alternately. In 2019, four groups from India – "Kathak", "Hindustani Kalari", "Bollywood" and "Shehnai" visited a number of regions of the Russian Federation. In addition, Indian-Russian working groups and a cultural exchange program have been established, which also meet the cultural and tourist needs of both countries.

== Public opinion ==
According to a 2014 BBC World Service Poll, 85% of Russians view India positively, with only 9% expressing a negative view. Similarly, a 2017 opinion poll by the Moscow-based non-governmental think tank Levada-Center states that Russians identified India as one of their top five "friends", with the others being Belarus, China, Kazakhstan, and Syria. A 2022 poll showed that 60% of Indians support the Indian government's handling of the Russian-Ukrainian war. A poll conducted in summer 2022 shows that Indians most frequently named Russia their most trusted partner, with 43% naming Russia as such compared to 27% who named the US. According to a May 2025 poll by the Levada Center, 32% of Russians consider India to be among Russia's closest friends and allies. In addition, 85% of Russians have a favorable opinion of India.

== Country comparison ==
Common name	India	Russia
Official name	Republic of India	Russian Federation
Coat of arms		
Flag		
Capital	New Delhi	Moscow
Largest city	Delhi	Moscow
Government	Federal parliamentary republic	Federal semi-presidential republic
Population	1,428,627,663	146,150,789
Official language	Hindi, English	Russian
Current leader	Prime Minister Narendra Modi	President Vladimir Putin
Religion	State secularism	State secularism

== See also ==
- Foreign relations of India
- Foreign relations of Russia
- Ambassadors of India to Russia
- Ambassadors of Russia to India
- India–Soviet Union relations
- The Great Game
- Indians in Russia
- Russians in India
- India-Russia RELOS Agreement
