= Gennady Zhilin =

Russian judge (1946–2025)

- Геннадий Жилин

Judge of the Constitutional Court of Russia
- In office 18 May 1999 – 31 August 2016
- Nominated by: Boris Yeltsin

Personal details
- Born: Gennady Aleksandrovich Zhilin; 11 August 1946 Shutkino, Kurgan Oblast, Russian SFSR, Soviet Union
- Died: 18 September 2025 (aged 79)
- Education: Sverdlovsk Law Institute (DS)
- Occupation: Judge, academic
- Awards: Honoured Lawyer of Russia; Order "For Merit to the Fatherland", 4th class Order of Honour

Gennady Aleksandrovich Zhilin (Russian: Геннадий Александрович Жилин; 11 August 1946 – 18 September 2025) was a Russian scholar of civil procedure law and judge. He served as a Judge of the Russia's Constitutional Court from 1999 to 2016.

Zhilin died on 18 September 2025, at the age of 79.

== Biography ==
Gennady Zhilin was born on 11 August 1946, in the village of Shutkino, Kargapolsky District, Kurgan Oblast, Soviet Russia.

From 1963 to 1965, he worked as an electrician. He performed his compulsory military service in the Soviet Armed Forces from 1965 to 1968.

In 1972, he graduated from the Sverdlovsk Law Institute (now Ural State Law University).

Between 1972 and 1976, he was a judge at the Pervouralsk Town Court. From 1976 to 1989, he served as a judge and later as deputy chief judge of the Sverdlovsk Oblast Court.

Zhilin was a judge of the Supreme Court of Russia from 1989 to 1999.

In 1991, he defended his thesis on the topic "Preparation of Civil Cases for Hearing in the Cassational Instance Court", earning the academic degree of Candidate of Sciences (PhD equivalent).

On 18 May 1999, he was appointed a judge of the Constitutional Court of Russia by the Federation Council, following the nomination by President Boris Yeltsin.

In 2000, he defended his Doctor of Sciences (habilitation) thesis on "The Objectives of Civil Proceedings and their Realization in the Court of First Instance".

Gennady Zhilin held the academic title of Professor at the Department of Civil, Arbitration, and Administrative Procedural Law of the Russian State University of Justice.

His primary scholarly focus was on civil procedure law, particularly the protection of human rights within the spheres of civil and constitutional jurisdiction. He conducted pioneering comprehensive research into the goal-setting of civil proceedings and the specifics of their optimal implementation. Zhilin provided definitions for legal categories characterizing the objective orientation of the activities of procedural subjects, formulated procedural tasks and goals that reveal their essence, the nature of their interaction within the procedural-legal mechanism, and the correlation of the objectives of justice across different courts protecting rights.

Gennady Zhilin remains the only judge in the history of the Constitutional Court of Russia to have been challenged by one of the parties involved in a case (specifically, by the representative of the President of Russia). However, the Constitutional Court dismissed the motion for recusal. This occurred on 25 October 2012, during a hearing concerning the constitutionality of presidential amendments to the Civil Procedure Code, which had legalized the review of private complaints from citizens without notifying the other parties to the proceedings.

== Awards ==
- Order "For Merit to the Fatherland", 4th class (2016)
- Order of Honour (2011)
- Honoured Lawyer of Russia (1998)
