= Georgy Tolstoy =

Soviet and Russian legal scholar (1927–2025)

- Георгий Толстой
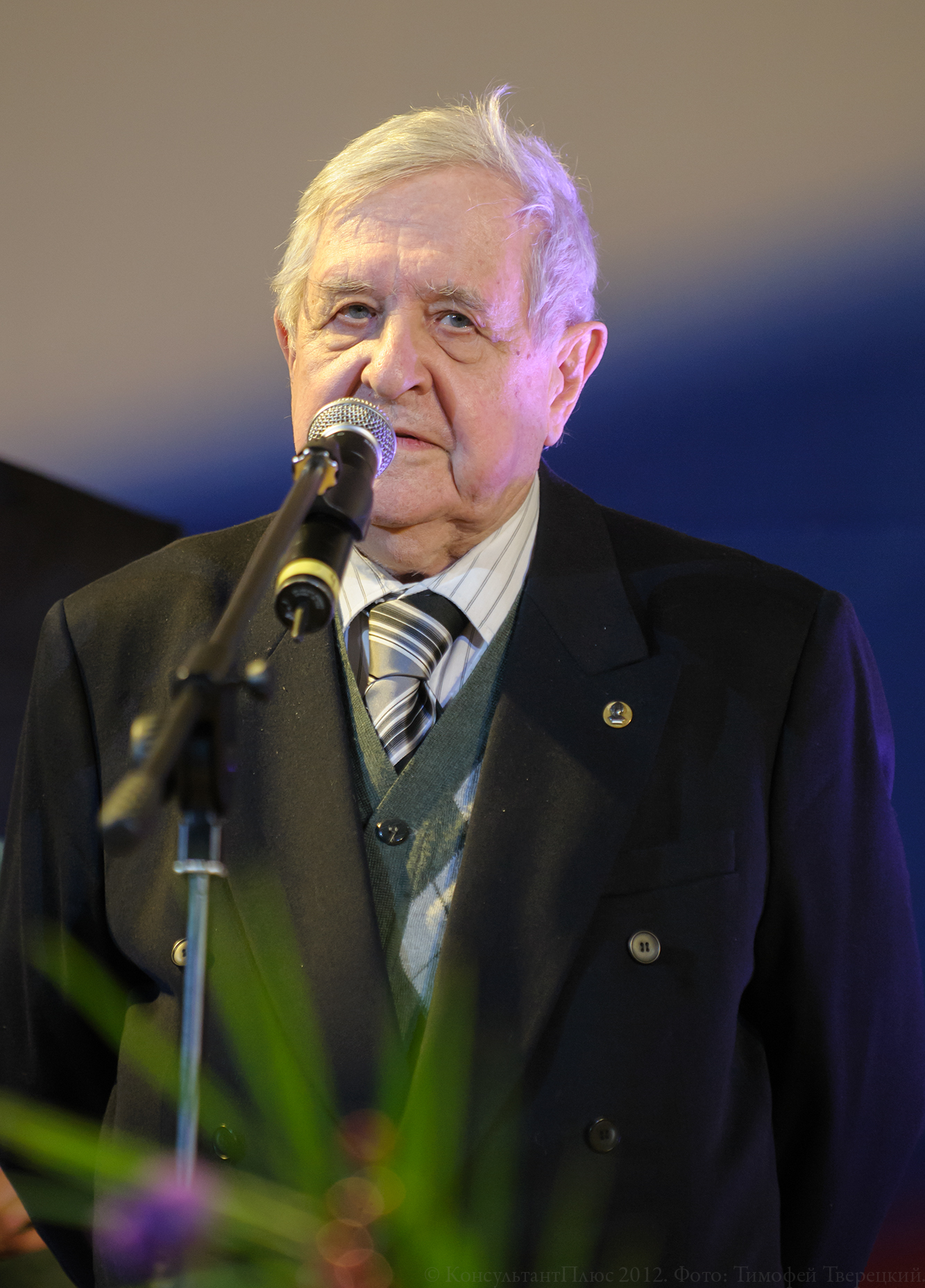
- Tolstoy in 2012
- Born: Georgy Kirillovich Tolstoy; 24 September 1927; Leningrad, Russian SFSR, Soviet Union
- Died: 10 November 2025 (aged 98); Saint Petersburg, Russia
- Awards: Order "For Merit to the Fatherland"; Honoured Scientist of Russia; Russian Federation Presidential Certificate of Honour

Academic background
- Education: Leningrad State University; (Specialist, Candidate of Sciences, Doctor of Sciences)
- Thesis: The Codification of the USSR; Civil Law (1961–1965) (1970)

Academic work
- Discipline: Civil law
- Institutions: Saint Petersburg State University Faculty of Law
- Doctoral students: Anton Ivanov; Mikhail Krotov; Aleksandr Konovalov
- Notable students: Vladimir Putin; Dmitry Medvedev; Aleksandr Gutsan; Alexander Bastrykin; Boris Kovalchuk; Konstantin Chuychenko; Lyudmila Zharkova; Andrey Bushev; Sergey Kazantsev
- Main interests: Property law; inheritance law; housing law; damages in tort; legal relationship; codification

Georgy Kirillovich "Yury" Tolstoy (Russian: Георгий Кириллович (Юрий) Толстой; 24 September 1927 – 10 November 2025) was a Soviet and Russian scholar of civil law, full member of the Russian Academy of Sciences and professor of the Saint Petersburg State University Faculty of Law. Tolstoy was widely known as a university professor of high-ranking Russian politicians, including Russian presidents Vladimir Putin and Dmitry Medvedev.

== Life and career ==
A member of the renowned Tolstoy family, Georgy was born in Leningrad, Soviet Russia, in 1927. His mother, a foreign languages teacher, died at the age of 26 from tuberculosis, when Georgy was only a year and a half, while his father, an engineer, died in 1933, when his son was almost six years old. Tolstoy was raised by his paternal grandmother, a University of Lausanne alumna.

In 1945, Tolstoy entered Leningrad State University and graduated with honors in 1950 with a law degree. In 1953, he completed his postgraduate studies and obtained a Candidate of Sciences (Ph.D. equal) degree. 17 years later he obtained a Doctor of Sciences (habilitation) degree with a thesis on "The Codification of the USSR Civil Law (1961–1965)". From 1956, he taught at the civil law department of his alma mater. In 1996, he co-wrote and co-edited a popular three-volume civil law textbook which over the years has sold a million copies and won the Russian Federation Governmental Prize for education in 2001.

From 1990 to 1991, Tolstoy was a member of the Committee for Constitutional Supervision of the USSR along with another notable law professor, Sergei Alexeyev.

In 2000, Tolstoy was elected corresponding member of the Russian Academy of Sciences, and in 2003, he became full member of the Academy.

In March 2022, Tolstoy signed a letter of support for the Russian invasion of Ukraine.

Tolstoy died on 10 November 2025, at the age of 98.

== Awards ==
- Full Cavalier of the Order "For Merit to the Fatherland":
  - Order "For Merit to the Fatherland", 1st class (2017)
  - Order "For Merit to the Fatherland", 2nd class (2022)
  - Order "For Merit to the Fatherland", 3rd class (2007)
  - Order "For Merit to the Fatherland", 4th class (2002)
- Honoured Scientist of Russia (1999)
- Russian Federation Presidential Certificate of Honour (2015)
- Medal of Anatoly Koni (1999)
