= Nikolay Bondar =

Russian judge (born 1950)

- Николай Бондарь
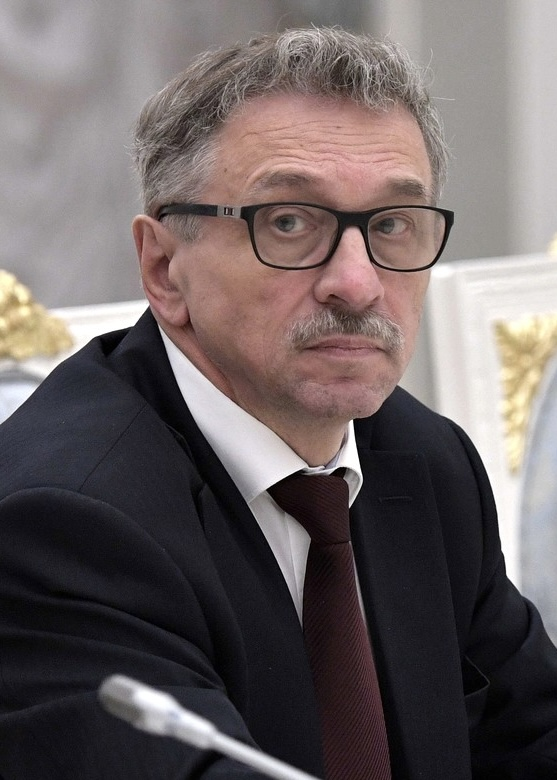

Judge of the Constitutional Court of Russia
- In office 16 February 2000 – 31 October 2020
- Nominated by: Vladimir Putin

Personal details
- Born: Nikolay Semyonovich Bondar; 18 October 1950 (age 76) Golubovka, Voroshilovgrad Oblast, Ukrainian SSR, Soviet Union
- Education: Rostov State University; Leningrad State University
- Occupation: Judge, academic
- Awards: Order of Honour; Medal of the Order "For Merit to the Fatherland", 2nd class Honoured Lawyer of Russia; Honoured Scientist of Russia; Russian Federation Presidential Certificate of Honour

Nikolay Semyonovich Bondar (Russian: Николай Семёнович Бондарь; born 18 October 1950) is a Russian jurist and constitutional law scholar who served as the judge of the Constitutional Court of Russia from 2000 to 2020.
