= Sergey Kazantsev =

Judge of the Russian Constitutional Court from 2002 to 2025

- Сергей Казанцев
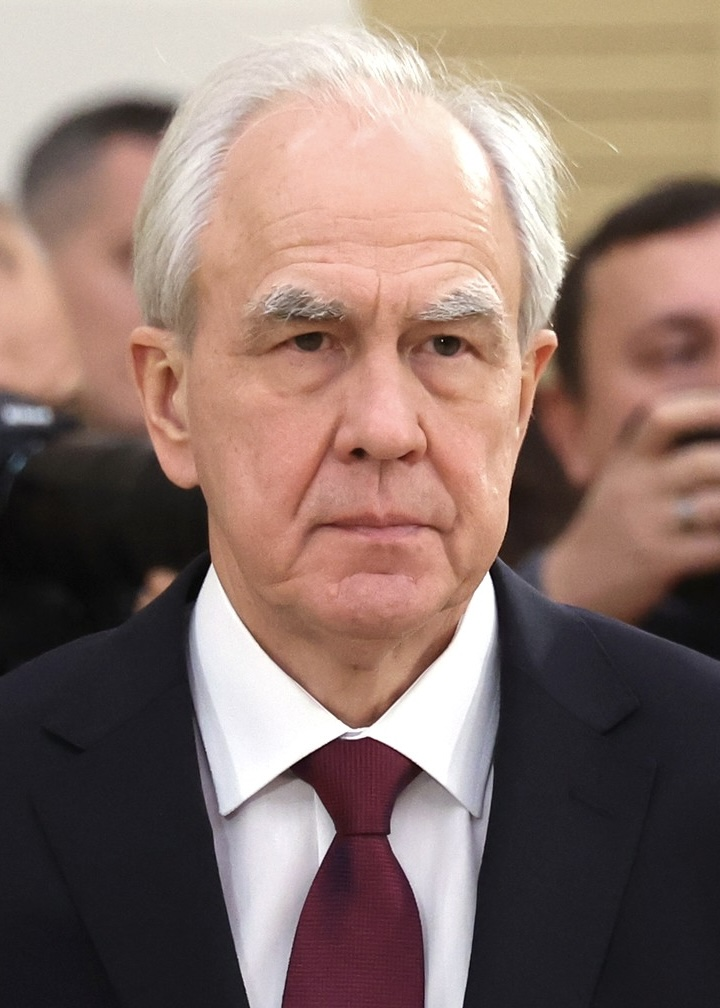

Judge of the Constitutional Court of Russia
- In office 29 March 2002 – 28 February 2025
- Nominated by: Vladimir Putin

Personal details
- Born: Sergey Mikhailovich Kazantsev; 16 February 1955 (age 71) Leningrad, Soviet Union
- Education: Leningrad State University
- Occupation: Judge, academic
- Awards: Order of Honour; Order of Friendship; Honoured Lawyer of Russia; State Prize of the Russian Federation; Russian Federation Presidential Certificate of Honour

Sergey Mikhailovich Kazantsev (Russian: Сергей Михайлович Казанцев; born 16 February 1955) is a Russian jurist and legal historian who served as the judge of the Constitutional Court of Russia from 2002 to 2025.

== Biography ==
Sergey Kazantsev was born in Leningrad, USSR (now Saint Petersburg, Russia).

From 1972 to 1977, he studied at the Faculty of Law at Leningrad State University (now Saint Petersburg State University). From 1977 to 1981, he pursued postgraduate studies at the same faculty.

Between 1986 and 1987 and again from 1989 to 1993 (and since 1995), he worked as an associate professor at the Department of Legal Theory and History of Leningrad (Saint Petersburg) State University. From 1987 to 1989, he served as Deputy Dean of the Law Faculty.

From 1993 to 1995, Kazantsev served as Chairman of the Housing Committee of the Saint Petersburg City Administration.

In 1996, he was awarded the State Prize of the Russian Federation in Science and Technology for his contribution to the nine-volume monograph "Russian Legislation of the 10th–20th Centuries".

In March 2002, the Federation Counsil appointed Kazantsev a judge of the Russian Constitutional Court. In 2003, he obtained a Doctor of Sciences degree by defending a thesis titled "The Prosecutor's Office of the Russian Empire: A Historical-Legal Study".

In December 2022, amid Russia's invasion of Ukraine, Kazantsev was added to the European Union sanctions list for "artificially creating the image of the legitimacy of Russia's invasion of Ukraine". He had previously been included in Ukraine's sanctions list.

In 2025, upon reaching the mandatory retirement age of 70, Kazantsev left the Court.
