= Nikolay Melnikov (judge) =

Judge of the Russian Constitutional Court from 2005 to 2025

- Николай Мельников
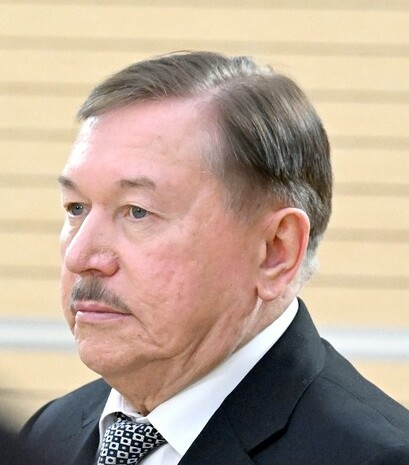

Judge of the Constitutional Court of Russia
- In office 25 February 2005 – 31 May 2025
- Nominated by: Vladimir Putin

3rd Prosecutor of the Sakha Republic
- In office 17 October 2003 – 25 February 2005
- Governor: Vyacheslav Shtyrov
- Preceded by: Nikolay Polyatinsky
- Succeeded by: Sergey Shumsky

Personal details
- Born: Nikolay Vasilyevich Melnikov; 27 May 1955 (age 71) Irkutsk, Soviet Union
- Education: Rostov State University
- Occupation: Judge, prosecutor
- Awards: Order of Honour; Order of Friendship; Russian Federation Presidential Certificate of Honour; Honoured Lawyer of Russia

Nikolay Vasilyevich Melnikov (Russian: Николай Васильевич Мельников; born 27 May 1955) is a Russian jurist and constitutional law scholar who served as the judge of the Constitutional Court of Russia from 2005 to 2025.

== Biography ==
Melnikov was born in Irkutsk, Soviet Union. He graduated from Rostov State University in 1977.

Beginning his career in law enforcement, Melnikov worked in the Prosecutor's Office of Oryol Oblast from 1977 to 1979 before transitioning to private practice as legal counsel at the Central Design and Technology Institute "Orgtyazhstroy" in Rostov-on-Don, where he worked between 1980 and 1985. He returned to prosecutorial service in 1989, holding various positions in the Prosecutor's Office of Rostov Oblast until 2003.

In 1997, Melnikov defended his Candidate of Sciences (Ph.D. equivalent) thesis titled "The Role of the Prosecutor's Office in Ensuring the Constitutional Right to Work for Russian Citizens". He further advanced his scholarly work in 2001 by completing his Doctor of Sciences (habilitation) thesis on "The Prosecutor's Office of Russia and Its Role in Protecting Constitutional Rights and Freedoms of Citizens", establishing himself as a leading expert on prosecutorial functions within Russia's constitutional framework.

Melnikov served as Chief Prosecutor of the Sakha Republic from 2003 to 2005. On 25 February 2005, the Federation Council appointed him to the Constitutional Court of Russia upon a nomination by President Vladimir Putin, where he served until reaching the mandatory retirement age of 70 in May 2025.

In December 2022, amid Russia's invasion of Ukraine, Melnikov was added to the European Union sanctions list for "artificially creating the image of the legitimacy of Russia's invasion of Ukraine". He had previously been included in Ukraine's sanctions list.
