= Sergey Knyazev =

Russian judge

- Сергей Князев
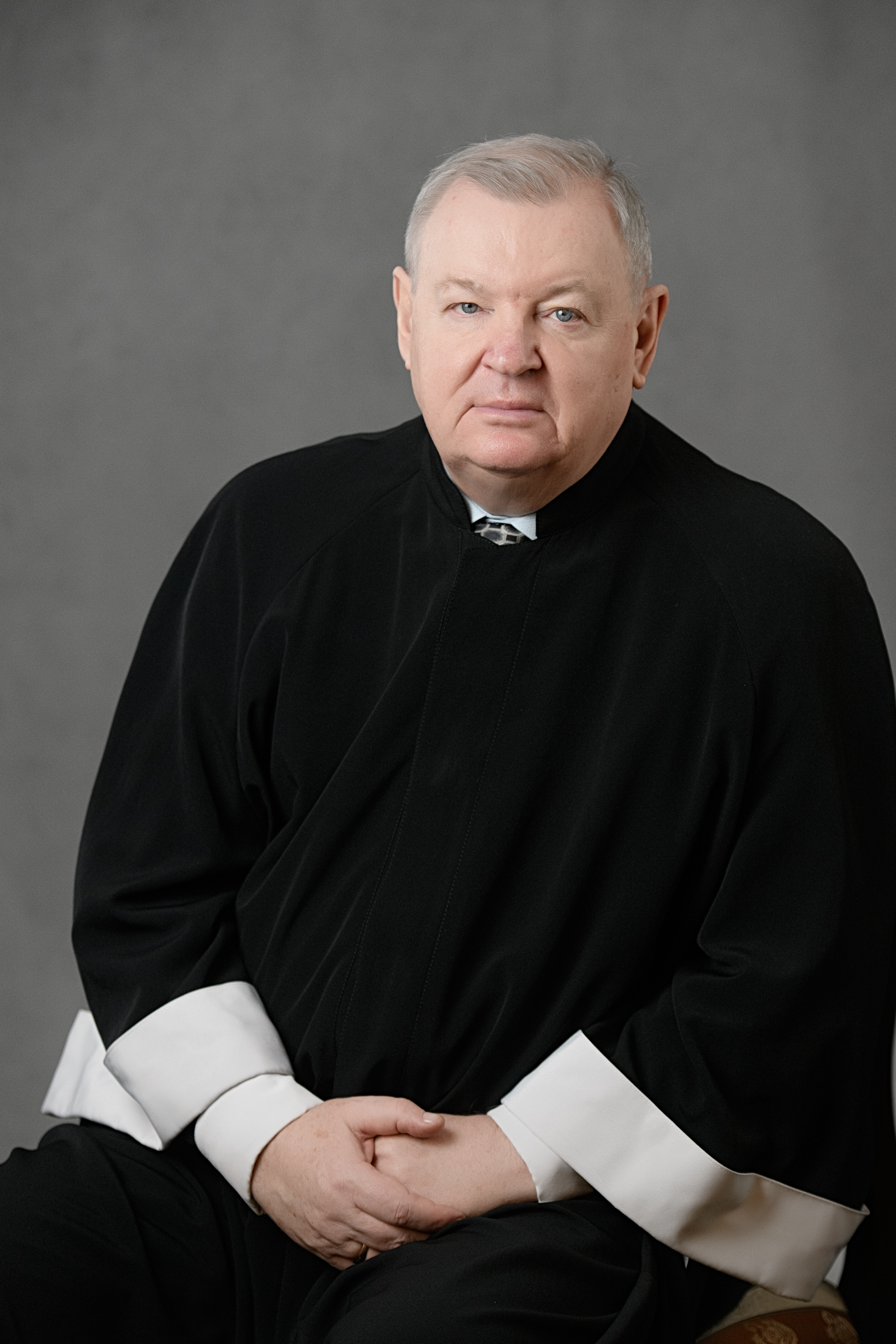
- Official portrait

Judge of the Constitutional Court of Russia
- Incumbent
- Assumed office 15 October 2008
- Nominated by: Dmitry Medvedev

Chairman of the Election Commission of Primorsky Krai
- In office 1995–2008
- Governor: Yevgeny Nazdratenko; Sergey Darkin
- Succeeded by: Konstantin Aranovsky

Personal details
- Born: Sergey Dmitrievich Knyazev; 15 February 1959 (age 67) Pavlovsky Posad, Russian SFSR, Soviet Union
- Education: Far Eastern State University; Leningrad State University
- Occupation: Judge, academic
- Awards: Order of Friendship; Medal of the Order "For Merit to the Fatherland", 2nd class Russian Federation Presidential Certificate of Honour; Honoured Lawyer of Russia; Honoured Scientist of Russia

Sergey Dmitrievich Knyazev (Russian: Сергей Дмитриевич Князев; born 15 February 1959) is a Russian jurist and scholar of constitutional and administrative law who currently serves as the judge of the Constitutional Court of Russia since 2008.

== Life and career ==
Knyazev, born in 1959 in Pavlovsky Posad, Moscow Oblast, graduated with honors from the Law Faculty of Far Eastern State University in 1981, after which he completed postgraduate studies at the Law Faculty of Leningrad State University, defending his Candidate of Sciences (Ph.D. equivalent) thesis in 1985 on "Legal Support for Comprehensive Urban Development Planning (Administrative-Legal Aspects)".

Beginning his academic career in 1985 at Far Eastern State University, Knyazev progressed from assistant professor to Head of the Department of Constitutional and Administrative Law. From 1989 to 1990 he served as Deputy Dean of the Law Faculty, and from 1990 to 1995 as Dean while continuing to lead the department.

Knyazev played a key role in developing the Charter of Primorsky Krai, the fundamental law of the region adopted in 1995. From 1995 to 2008 he chaired the Electoral Commission of Primorsky Krai. In 1999, he defended his Doctor of Sciences (habilitation) thesis at Saint Petersburg State University on "Electoral Law in the Legal System of the Russian Federation (Theoretical and Practical Issues)".

In October 2008, following nomination by President Dmitry Medvedev and approval by the Federation Council, Knyazev was appointed judge of the Russian Constitutional Court. He concurrently serves as Professor of the Department of Administrative and Finance Law at the Saint Petersburg State University Faculty of Law.

In December 2022, amid Russia's invasion of Ukraine, Knyazev was added to the European Union sanctions list for "artificially creating the image of the legitimacy of Russia's invasion of Ukraine". He had previously been included in Ukraine's sanctions list.

== Awards and honours ==
- Order of Friendship (2019)
- Russian Federation Presidential Certificate of Honour (2016)
- Honoured Scientist of Russia (2011)
- Medal of the Order "For Merit to the Fatherland", 2nd class (2008)
- Honoured Lawyer of Russia (2001)
