= Konstantin Aranovsky =

Judge of the Russian Constitutional Court from 2010 to 2022

- Константин Арановский
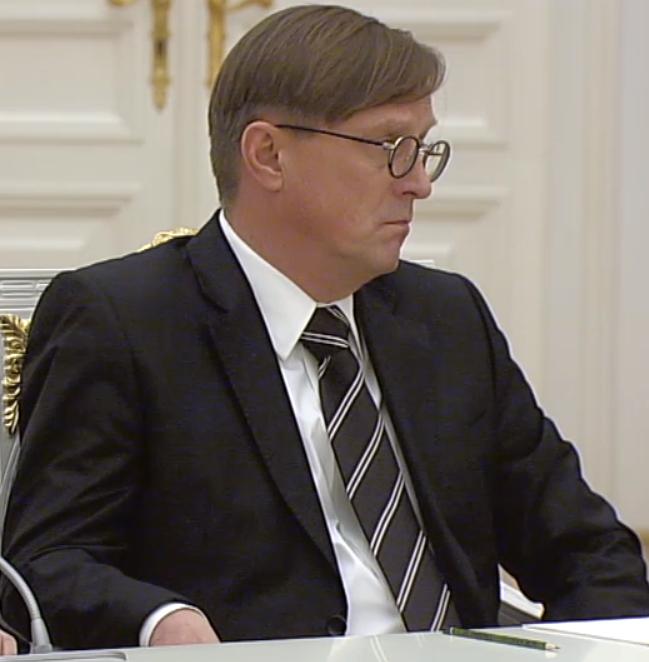

Judge of the Constitutional Court of Russia
- In office 3 March 2010 – 27 September 2022
- Nominated by: Dmitry Medvedev

Chairman of the Election Commission of Primorsky Krai
- In office 12 November 2008 – 17 February 2010
- Governor: Sergey Darkin
- Preceded by: Sergey Knyazev

Personal details
- Born: Konstantin Viktorovich Aranovsky; 19 November 1964 (age 61) Korsakov, Sakhalin Oblast, Russian SFSR, Soviet Union
- Education: Far Eastern State University (Specialist, Candidate of Sciences); Leningrad State University (Doctor of Sciences)
- Occupation: Judge, academic
- Awards: Honoured Lawyer of Russia

Konstantin Viktorovich Aranovsky (Russian: Константин Викторович Арановский; born 19 November 1964) is a Russian jurist and constitutional law scholar who served as a judge of the Constitutional Court of Russia from 2010 to 2022.

== Biography ==
In 1987 Aranovsky graduated with honours from the law faculty of Far Eastern State University. Later he studied in graduate school of the Leningrad State University Faculty of Law along with Dmitry Medvedev.

From 1990 to 1994 he worked at the Department of State and International Law of the Far Eastern State University.

In 1990, he obtained a Candidate of Sciences degree by defending a thesis titled "Ensuring the Constitutionality of Normative Acts of Local Soviets", and in 2004, he earned his Doctor of Sciences degree with a thesis titled "Constitutional Tradition and Its Dissemination in Russian Society".

From 2008 to 2010 he chaired the Election Commission of Primorsky Krai.

On 3 March 2010, the Federation Council appointed Aranovsky the judge of the Constitutional Court of Russia after he had been nominated by President Medvedev.

During his service in the Russian Constitutional Court, Aranovsky wrote several dissenting opinions on high-impact cases such as cases of the attorney-client privilege, on the right of persons with dual citizenship to own the media, on the admission of conditionally sentenced offenders to the elections (to which Alexei Navalny referred during his 2018 presidential campaign) and on the higher education system in Russia. In 2019 Aranovsky claimed that the USSR had been an "illegally created state" and the Russian Federation should not be considered the successor of the "repressive and terrorist acts" of the Soviet government. Shortly afterwards, the leader of the Communist Party Gennady Zyuganov called Aranovsky to resign.

In 2014 and 2020 Aranovsky missed the sessions of the Constitutional Court when it considered the issue of the accession of Crimea and amendments to the Constitution of the Russian Federation, respectively.

In September 2022, Aranovsky resigned. According to Kommersant, Aranovsky's resignation may be a way for him to express a dissenting opinion or disagreement in a situation where it is impossible to express it in any other way. The reason, according to the newspaper, was Aranovsky's unwillingness to participate in the verification of "treaties of accession" of the Donetsk People’s Republic, Kherson Oblast, Luhansk People’s Republic, and Zaporizhzhia Oblast.

Aranovsky currently serves as a professor at the Department of Public Law of the State Academic University for the Humanities in Moscow.
