= List of judges of the Constitutional Court of Russia =

Members of the Constitutional Court of Russia

Judge of the Constitutional Court of the Russian Federation
- Судья Конституционного Суда Российской Федерации (Russian)
- Coat of Arms of Russia

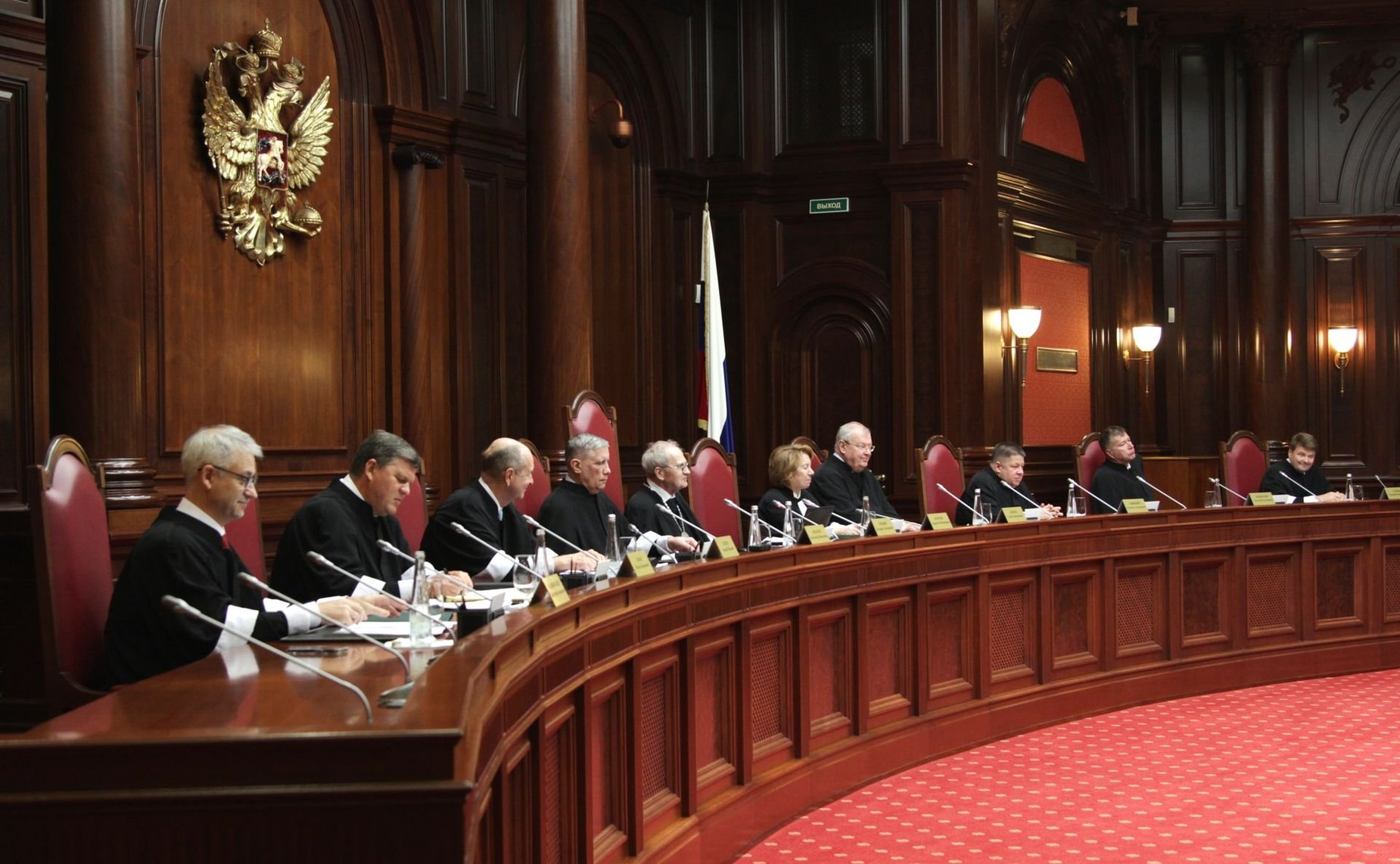
- Judges of the Constitutional Court during a session in 2025
- Constitutional Court of Russia
- Style: Honorable Court, Honorable Judge
- Status: Judge
- Member of: Judiciary of Russia
- Seat: Saint Petersburg
- Nominator: President of Russia
- Appointer: Federation Council
- Term length: Mandatory retirement at age 70 for regular judges and at age 76 for Deputy President of the Court
- Constituting instrument: Constitution of Russia; Federal Constitutional Law "On the Constitutional Court of the Russian Federation"
- Formation: 12 July 1991; 35 years ago
- Website: Official English website

The Constitutional Court of Russia is one of two highest courts in court system of the Russian Federation. It is composed of eleven Judges of the Constitutional Court (Russian: Судьи Конституционного Суда), with one of them being the 'President of the Court' (Russian: Председатель Конституционного Суда) and one being Deputy President of the Court (Russian: Заместитель Председателя Конституционного Суда). The exact number of the Judges of the Constitutional Court is determined by article 125 of the Constitution of Russia.

By article 9 of the Federal Constitutional Law "On the Constitutional Court of the Russian Federation", the Federation Council shall consider the question of the appointment of the Judge of the Constitutional Court of the Russian Federation in no event later than fourteen days after the receipt of the submission of the President of the Russian Federation. Proposals regarding candidates for offices of Judges of the Constitutional Court may be introduced to the President by Senators and by deputies of the State Duma, as well as by legislative bodies of federal subjects of Russia, supreme judicial bodies and federal legal departments, all-Russia law associations, legal research and educational institutions.

According to article 8 of the Federal Constitutional Law "On the Constitutional Court of the Russian Federation", in order to become a Judge of the Constitutional Court a person must be a citizen of Russia, at least 40 years of age, have legal education, have served as a lawyer for at least 15 years and have "recognized high qualification" in law.

== Term length and number of judges ==
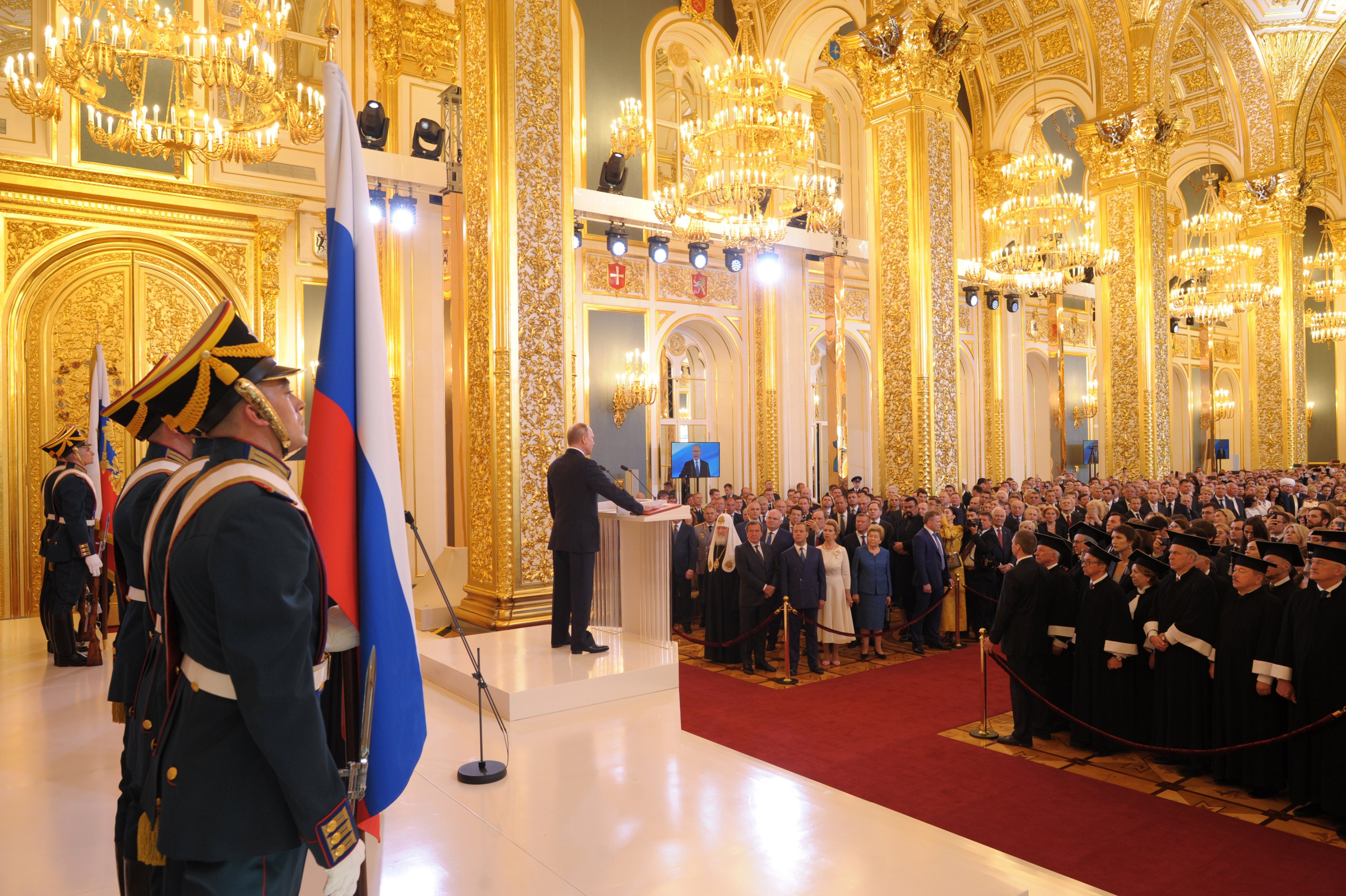
Judges of the Constitutional Court (right) during Vladimir Putin's fourth inauguration ceremony, 7 May 2018

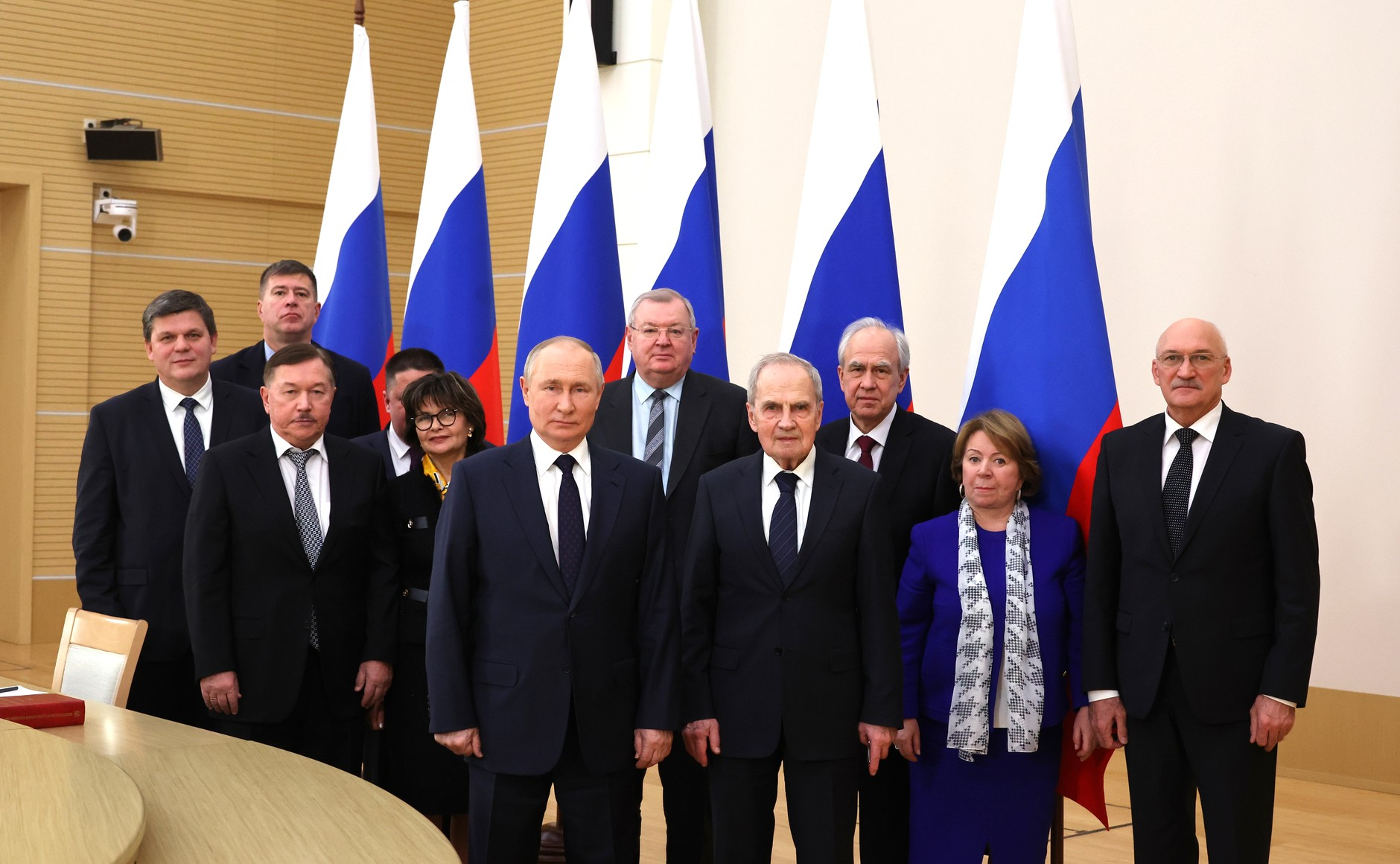
Judges of the Constitutional Court with Russian president Vladimir Putin, 12 December 2023

The rules for the term of office of a judge of the Constitutional Court have differed in various versions of the Constitutional Court Law.

The RSFSR Law "On the Constitutional Court of the RSFSR" settled the number of 15 judges, all appointed by the Congress of People's Deputies of Russia without an exact tenure, but with an age limit of 65. The law mentioned positions of Court President, Deputy President, and Judge-Secretary.

The 1993 Constitution of Russia originally settled 19 judges of the Constitutional Court, all appointed by the Federation Council with President's nomination. Between 1993 and 1994, the legislation did not include any specific term length beside the age limit.

The first version of the Federal Constitutional Law "On the Constitutional Court of the Russian Federation", approved in 1994, determined the term length to be 12 years, and age limit to be 70. The judges would elect Court President, Deputy President, and Judge-Secretary from among themselves, for a term of 3 years (renewable).

The 2001 amendments increased the term length from 12 to 15 years and completely dismissed the age limit. In the end of the same year, the age limit of 70 was restored.

In 2005, the tenure length was dismissed.

In 2009, the position of Judge-Secretary was dismissed, and position of the second Deputy President was established. The new term of office for all judges was then 6 years long.

Since 2010, the President of the Constitutional Court has been exempted from the age limit of 70.

Since 2018, the age limit for the Deputy President of the Constitutional Court has been increased to 76 years old.

The 2020 amendments to the Constitution of Russia decreased the number of judges from 19 to 11 and abolished the position of the second Deputy President of the Court.

== Current Judges ==
Below table is list of current Judges of the Constitutional Court of Russia.

Name	Tenure / Current Length	Nominated by	Previous service before court appointment	Education
Valery Zorkin (b. 1943); President	October 29, 1991 / 34 years, 338 days	Congress of People's Deputies of Russia	Professor of Constitutional Law at the Higher Correspondence School of Law of the Ministry of Internal Affairs (1986–1991)	Moscow State University
Aleksandr Konovalov (b. 1968); Deputy President	April 16, 2025 / 1 year, 169 days	Vladimir Putin	Presidential Plenipotentiary Representative in the Constitutional Court (2020–2025)	Saint Petersburg State University
Sergey Knyazev (b. 1959)	October 15, 2008 / 17 years, 352 days	Dmitry Medvedev	Chair of the Election Commission of Primorsky Krai (1995–2008)	Far Eastern State University
Aleksandr Kokotov (b. 1961)	March 3, 2010 / 16 years, 213 days	Dmitry Medvedev	Head of Constitutional Law Department of the Ural State Law University (1998–2010)	Ural State Law University
Andrey Bushev (b. 1966)	June 8, 2022 / 4 years, 116 days	Vladimir Putin	Associate Professor of Commercial Law at the Saint Petersburg State University (since 2000), arbitrator of the International Commercial Arbitration Court at the Chamber of Commerce and Industry (2000–2022)	Saint Petersburg State University
Vladimir Sivitsky (b. 1974)	June 21, 2023 / 3 years, 103 days	Vladimir Putin	Head of the Constitutional and Administrative Law Department of the HSE campus in Saint Petersburg (2008–2023), Head of the Secretariat of the Constitutional Court (2015–2023)	Moscow State University
Mikhail Lobov (b. 1971)	September 25, 2023 / 3 years, 7 days	Vladimir Putin	Judge of the European Court of Human Rights (2022)	Moscow State Institute of International Relations
Konstantin Kalinovsky (b. 1971)	July 16, 2025 / 1 year, 78 days	Vladimir Putin	Head of Criminal Procedure Department of the Russian State University of Justice (2013–2025)	Saint Petersburg University of the Ministry of Internal Affairs of Russia
Yevgeny Taribo (b. 1976)	July 16, 2025 / 1 year, 78 days	Vladimir Putin	Head of the Secretariat of the Constitutional Court (2023–2025)	Ural State Law University
Victoria Korobchenko (b. 1975)	July 24, 2026 / 70 days	Vladimir Putin	Head of the Department of Constitutional Foundations of Labour Legislation and Social Protection of the Constitutional Court (2025–2026)	Saint Petersburg State University

== Former Judges ==
Resigned. Died in office.
Name	Tenure	Nominated by	Previous service before court appointment	Education
Ernest Ametistov (1934–1998)	30 October 1991 – 7 September 1998 (6 years, 312 days)	Congress of People's Deputies of Russia	Leading research fellow at the All-Union Scientific Research Institute of Soviet Legislation (1976–1991)	Moscow State University
Vladimir Oleynik (1936–1999)	30 October 1991 – 17 February 1999 (7 years, 110 days)	Congress of People's Deputies of Russia	Member of the Congress of People's Deputies of the Soviet Union (1990–1991)	Perm State University
Nikolay Vedernikov (b. 1934)	30 October 1991 – 16 February 2000 (8 years, 109 days)	Congress of People's Deputies of Russia	Member of the Congress of People's Deputies of the Soviet Union (1990–1991)	Tomsk State University
Tamara Morshchakova (b. 1936); Deputy President in 1995–2002	30 October 1991 – 29 March 2002 (10 years, 150 days)	Congress of People's Deputies of Russia	Chief research fellow at the All-Union Scientific Research Institute of Soviet Legislation (1985–1991)	Moscow State University
Oleg Tiunov (1937–2017)	30 October 1991 – 12 February 2003 (11 years, 105 days)	Congress of People's Deputies of Russia	Member of the Congress of People's Deputies of the Soviet Union (1990–1991)	Perm State University
Nikolay Vitruk (1937–2012); Deputy President in 1991–1995, Acting President in 1993–1995	30 October 1991 – 12 February 2003 (11 years, 105 days)	Congress of People's Deputies of Russia	Head of the Public Law Disciplines Department at the Higher Correspondence School of Law of the Ministry of Internal Affairs (1984–1991)	Tomsk State University
Viktor Luchin (1939–2021)	30 October 1991 – 25 February 2005 (13 years, 118 days)	Congress of People's Deputies of Russia	Associate Professor of State-Building and Legal Policy at the Russian Social Political Institute (1989–1991)	Voronezh State University
Boris Ebzeyev (1950–2026)	30 October 1991 – 4 September 2008 (16 years, 310 days)	Congress of People's Deputies of Russia	Professor of Constitutional Law at the Saratov State Academy of Law (1989–1991)	Saratov State Academy of Law
Anatoly Kononov (1947–2022)	30 October 1991 – 1 January 2010 (18 years, 63 days)	Congress of People's Deputies of Russia	Member of the Supreme Soviet of Russia (1990–1991)	Moscow State University
Nikolay Seleznev (1945–2021); Judge-Secretary in 1998–2001	30 October 1991 – 31 May 2015 (23 years, 213 days)	Congress of People's Deputies of Russia	Member of the Supreme Soviet of Russia (1990–1991)	Yaroslavl State University
Yury Rudkin (b. 1951); Judge-Secretary in 1991–1998	30 October 1991 – 30 November 2021 (30 years, 31 days)	Congress of People's Deputies of Russia	Prosecutor of Kemerovo Oblast (1986–1991)	Ural State Law University
Gadis Gadzhiev (b. 1953)	30 October 1991 – 31 August 2023 (31 years, 305 days)	Congress of People's Deputies of Russia	Member of the Supreme Soviet of the Dagestan ASSR (1990–1991)	Moscow State University
Vladimir Tumanov (1926–2011); President in 1995–1997	25 October 1994 – 11 June 1997 (2 years, 259 days)	Boris Yeltsin	Member of the State Duma (1993–1994)	Institute of Foreign Trade
Olga Khokhryakova (1949–2019); Deputy President in 2008–2019	25 October 1994 – 31 July 2019 (24 years, 279 days)	Boris Yeltsin	Research fellow at the Institute of Legislation and Comparative Law under the Government of Russia (1976–1994)	Ural State Law University
Vladimir Yaroslavtsev (b. 1952)	25 October 1994 – 31 March 2022 (27 years, 157 days)	Boris Yeltsin	Judge of the Saint Petersburg City Court (1985–1994)	Saint Petersburg State University
Yury Danilov (b. 1950); Judge-Secretary in 2001–2009	15 November 1994 – 31 August 2020 (25 years, 290 days)	Boris Yeltsin	Deputy Chair of the State Antimonopoly Committee (1993–1994)	Voronezh State University
Vladimir Strekozov (1940–2017); Deputy President in 2002–2008	6 December 1994 – 6 July 2010 (15 years, 212 days)	Boris Yeltsin	Professor of Constitutional Law at the Military Academy of Economics, Finance, and Law (1993–1994)	Lenin Military-Political Academy
Marat Baglai (1931–2024); President in 1997–2003	7 February 1995 – 21 February 2003 (8 years, 14 days)	Boris Yeltsin	Professor of Constitutional Law at the Moscow State Institute of International Relations (1977–1995)	Rostov State University
Lyudmila Zharkova (b. 1955); Deputy President in 2025–2026	11 June 1997 – 30 September 2026 (29 years, 111 days)	Boris Yeltsin	Judge of the Constitutional Court of the Republic of Karelia (1994–1997)	Saint Petersburg State University
Anatoly Sliva (b. 1940)	14 October 1998 – 18 March 2010 (11 years, 155 days)	Boris Yeltsin	Presidential Plenipotentiary Representative to the Federation Council (1996–1998)	Moscow State University
Gennady Zhilin (1946–2025)	18 May 1999 – 31 August 2016 (17 years, 105 days)	Boris Yeltsin	Judge of the Supreme Court of Russia (1989–1999)	Ural State Law University
Nikolay Bondar (b. 1950)	16 February 2000 – 31 October 2020 (20 years, 258 days)	Vladimir Putin	Dean of the Institute of Law and Management of Rostov State University (1997–2000)	Rostov State University
Sergey Kazantsev (b. 1955)	29 March 2002 – 28 February 2025 (22 years, 336 days)	Vladimir Putin	Associate Professor of Legal Theory and History at the Saint Petersburg State University (1995–2002)	Saint Petersburg State University
Mikhail Kleandrov (b. 1946)	12 February 2003 – 31 August 2016 (13 years, 201 days)	Vladimir Putin	Chief Judge of the Court of Arbitration of Tyumen Oblast (1995–2003)	Tajik State University
Larisa Krasavchikova (b. 1955)	12 February 2003 – 31 March 2025 (22 years, 47 days)	Vladimir Putin	Professor of Civil Law at the Ural State Law University (1995–2003)	Ural State Law University
Sergey Mavrin (1951–2025); Deputy President in 2009-2025	25 February 2005 – 1 April 2025 (20 years, 35 days)	Vladimir Putin	Head of Labour Law Department of Saint Petersburg State University (1992–2005)	Saint Petersburg State University
Nikolay Melnikov (b. 1955)	25 February 2005 – 31 May 2025 (20 years, 95 days)	Vladimir Putin	Prosecutor of the Republic of Sakha (2003–2005)	Rostov State University]
Konstantin Aranovsky (b. 1964)	3 March 2010 – 27 September 2022 (12 years, 208 days)	Dmitry Medvedev	Chair of the Election Commission of Primorsky Krai (2008–2010)	Far Eastern State University
Alexander Boytsov (b. 1950)	14 July 2010 – 30 September 2020 (10 years, 78 days)	Dmitry Medvedev	Professor of Criminal Law at the Saint Petersburg State University (1999–2010)	Saint Petersburg State University

== See also ==
- Judiciary of Russia
- Constitutional Court of Russia
- President of the Constitutional Court of Russia
- Lists of supreme court justices
