= Konstantin Kalinovsky (judge) =

Russian judge

- Константин Калиновский
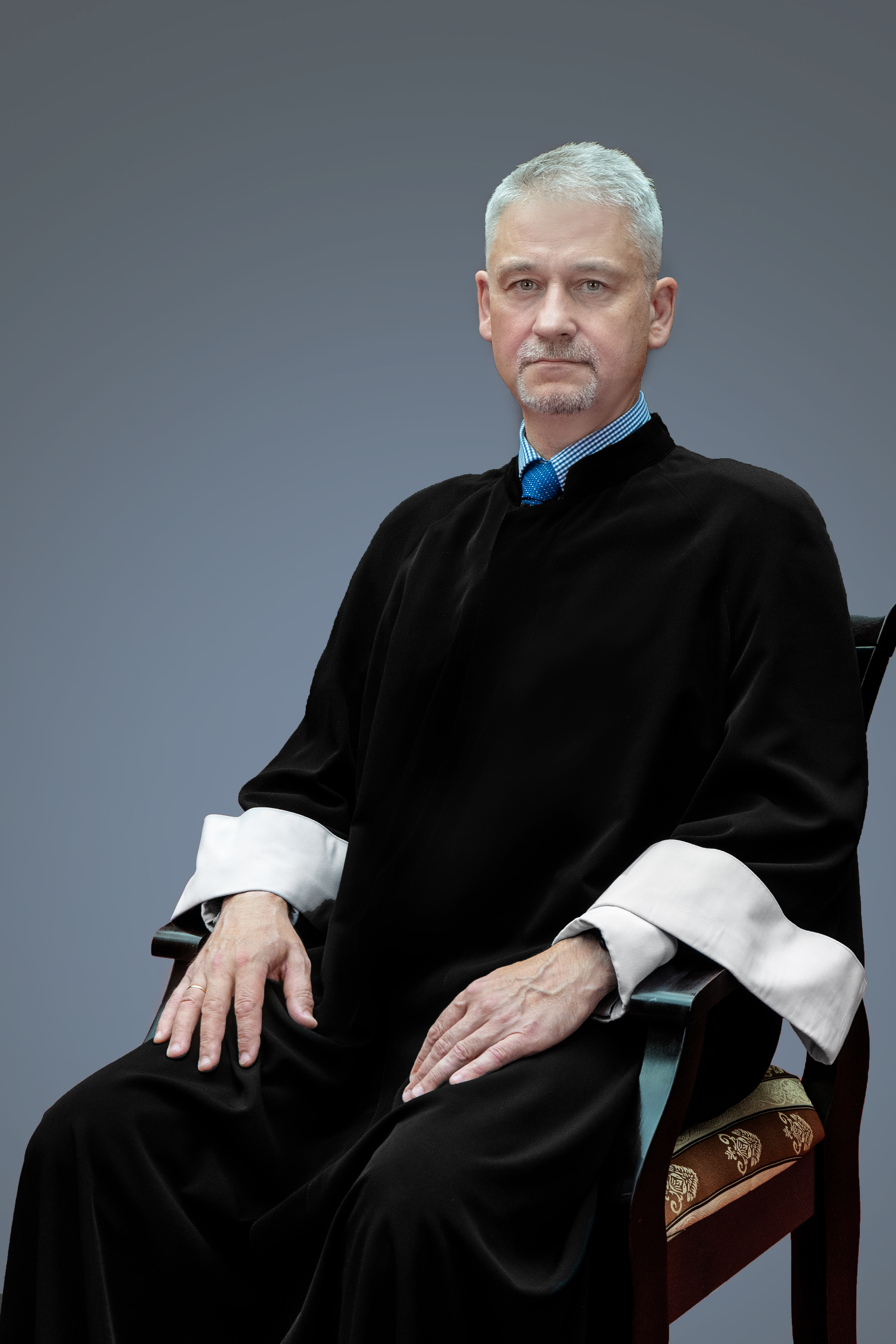
- Official portrait

Judge of the Constitutional Court of Russia
- Incumbent
- Assumed office 16 July 2025
- Nominated by: Vladimir Putin

Personal details
- Born: Konstantin Borisovich Kalinovsky; 12 December 1971 (age 54) Pryazha, Soviet Karelia, Russian SFSR, Soviet Union
- Education: Saint Petersburg Higher School of the Ministry of Internal Affairs of Russia
- Occupation: Judge, academic

Konstantin Borisovich Kalinovsky (Russian: Константин Борисович Калиновский; born 12 December 1971) is a Russian jurist and scholar of criminal procedure law who currently serves as the judge of the Constitutional Court of Russia since 2025.

== Life and career ==
After completing compulsory military service in the Soviet Armed Forces from 1989 to 1991, Kalinovsky joined the law enforcement agencies. In 1996, he graduated with honors from the St. Petersburg Higher School of the Russian Ministry of Internal Affairs. In 1999, he defended his Candidate of Sciences (Ph.D. equal) thesis on the topic "Legality and Types of Criminal Procedure".

From 1997 to 2005, he worked as a lecturer and associate professor at the Department of Criminal Procedure of Saint Petersburg University of the Ministry of Internal Affairs.

From 2005 to 2007, he served as head of the Department of State Law and acting deputy dean at the Faculty of Law of the Saint Petersburg University of Humanities and Social Sciences.

Since 2007, he has been head of the Department of Criminal Procedure at the Northwestern Branch of the Russian State University of Justice.

Beginning in 2008, he combined academic and teaching work with public service in the Secretariat of the Constitutional Court of Russia, holding the positions of advisor to the department, senior advisor of the Department of Constitutional Foundations of Criminal Justice, and advisor to the Constitutional Court.

On 16 July 2025, he was appointed a judge of the Constitutional Court by the Federation Council upon nomination by President Vladimir Putin.
