= Vladimir Sivitsky =

Russian judge

- Владимир Сивицкий
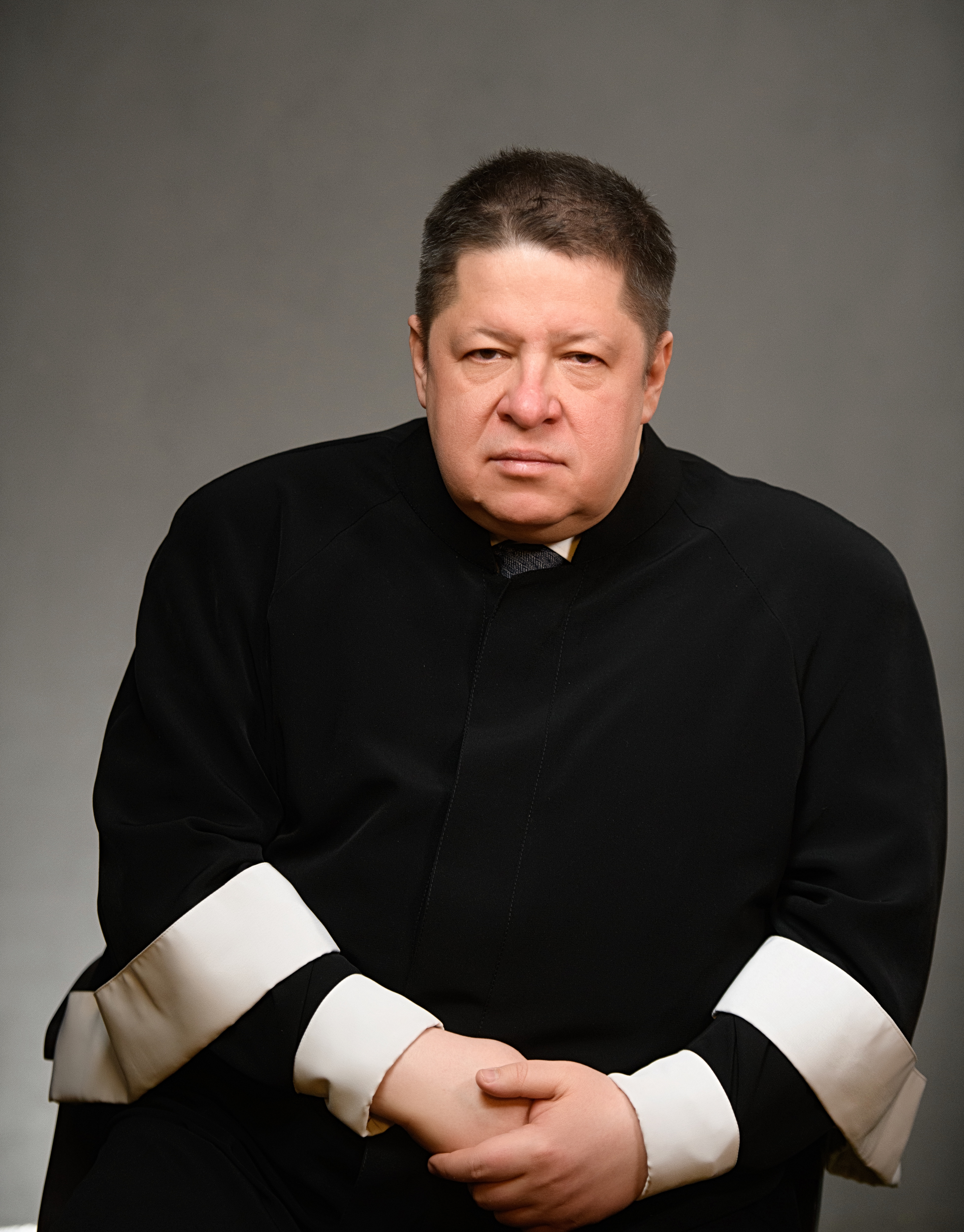
- Official portrait

Judge of the Constitutional Court of Russia
- Incumbent
- Assumed office 21 June 2023
- Nominated by: Vladimir Putin

Personal details
- Born: Vladimir Alexandrovich Sivitsky; 2 October 1974 (age 51) Moscow, Soviet Union
- Education: Moscow State University
- Occupation: Judge, academic
- Awards: Medal of the Order "For Merit to the Fatherland", 2nd class Honoured Lawyer of Russia

Vladimir Alexandrovich Sivitsky (Russian: Владимир Александрович Сивицкий; born 2 October 1974) is a Russian jurist and scholar of constitutional law who currently serves as the judge of the Constitutional Court of Russia since 2023.

== Life and career ==
Vladimir Sivitsky graduated with honors from the Faculty of Law of Moscow State University. In 1999, he defended his thesis for the degree of Candidate of Sciences (Ph.D. equivalent) entitled "Systematization of Constitutional Acts of the Russian Federation".

From 2002 to 2005, he served as Head of the Office of the Committee on Local Government of the Federation Council. He also worked in the office of the Mayor of Moscow and Government of Moscow as First Deputy Head of the Department for Relations with Legislative and Executive Authorities.

Between 1995–2002 and 2008–2023, he worked in the Secretariat of the Constitutional Court of Russia, becoming its Head in September 2015.

From 2006, he taught at the Higher School of Economics, serving as Acting Dean of the Law Faculty (2006–2008). Since 2008, he has been Head of the Department of Constitutional and Administrative Law at the HSE campus in Saint Petersburg.

On June 21, 2023, upon nomination by President Vladimir Putin, he was appointed as a Judge of the Constitutional Court of Russia during a plenary session of the Federation Council. According to Valery Zorkin, the Court's President, Sivitsky's candidacy was recommended to Putin by Taliya Habrieva.

== Awards ==
- Honoured Lawyer of Russia (2018)
- Medal of the Order "For Merit to the Fatherland", 2nd class (2011)
