= Nikolay Melnikov =

Nikolay Melnikov may refer to:

- Nikolay Melnikov (jurist) (1882–1972), chairman of the council of ministers of the South Russian Government
- Nikolay Melnikov (water polo) (born 1948), Soviet water polo player
- Nikolay Melnikov (judge) (born 1955), judge of the Constitutional Court of Russia
- Nikolay Melnikov (curler) (born 1964), Russian wheelchair curler
