= Yevgeny Taribo =

Russian judge

- Евгений Тарибо
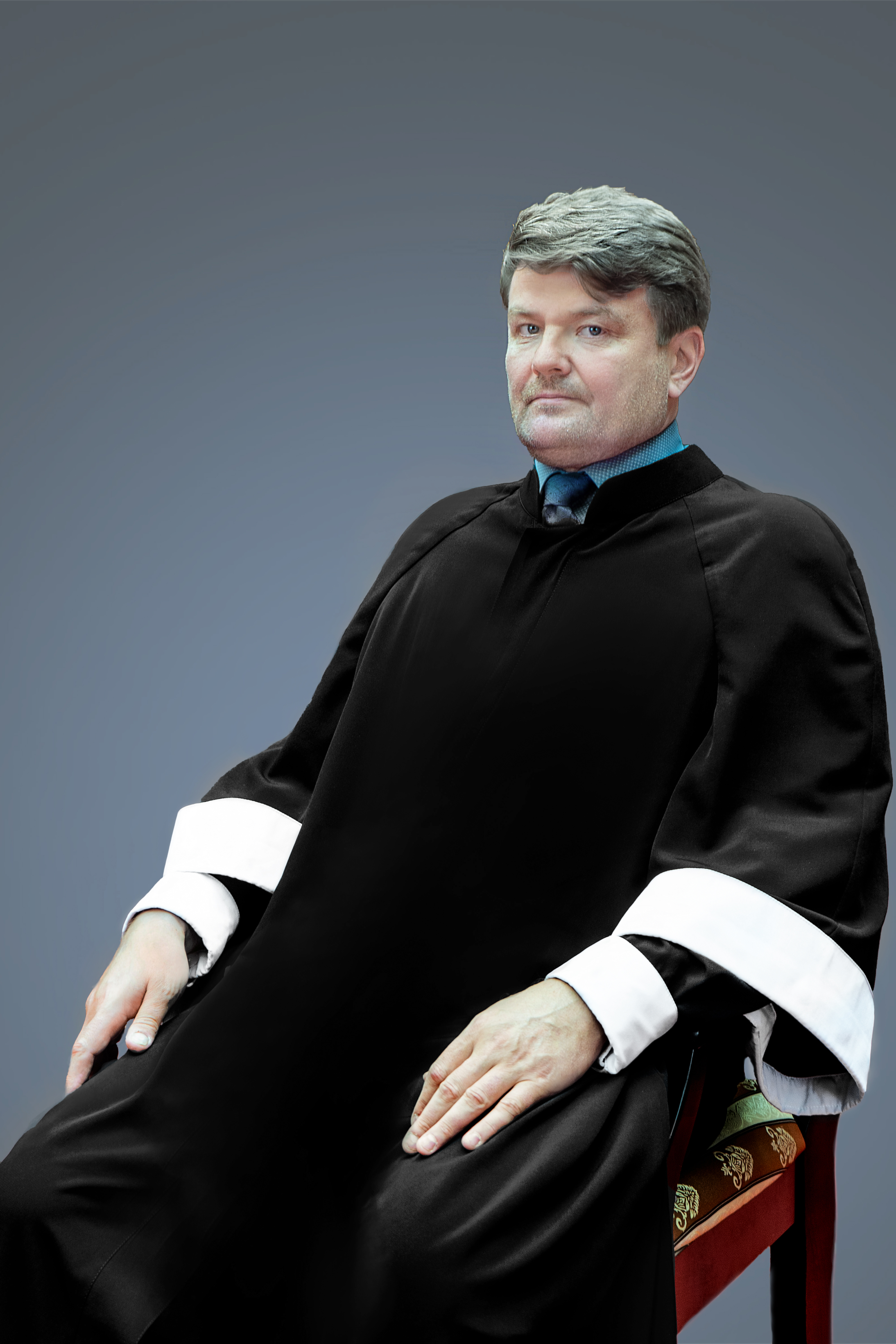
- Official portrait

Judge of the Constitutional Court of Russia
- Incumbent
- Assumed office 16 July 2025
- Nominated by: Vladimir Putin

Personal details
- Born: Yevgeny Vasilyevich Taribo; 1979 (age 46–47) Kurgan, Russian SFSR, Soviet Union
- Education: Ural State Law University
- Occupation: Judge, academic

Yevgeny Vasilyevich Taribo (Russian: Евгений Васильевич Тарибо; born 1979) is a Russian jurist and scholar of constitutional law, administrative law and tax law who currently serves as the judge of the Constitutional Court of Russia since 2025.

== Life and career ==
In 2000, Taribo graduated from Ural State Law Academy. In 2005, he defended his Candidate of Sciences (Ph.D. equal) thesis on the topic "Doctrines of the Constitutional Court of the Russian Federation in the Field of Taxation: Theoretical and Practical Aspects", at the Russian State University of Justice. Then, in 2019, he defended his Doctor of Sciences (habilitation) thesis on "Problems of the Evolutionary Development of the Russian Model of Judicial Constitutional Normative Control" at Moscow State University.

In 2001, he joined the Secretariat of the Constitutional Court of Russia as Chief Consultant of the Department of Constitutional Foundations of Administrative Law. For a long time, he headed the Department of Constitutional Foundations of Public Law. In 2023, he was appointed by the Constitutional Court as Head of the Court’s Secretariat.

Since 2010, he has been engaged in research and teaching at the Russian Presidential Academy of National Economy and Public Administration, where he serves as Professor at the Department of Constitutional and Administrative Law.

On 16 July 2025, Taribo was appointed a judge of the Constitutional Court by the Federation Council upon nomination by President Vladimir Putin.
