= Aleksandr Kokotov =

Russian judge

- Александр Кокотов
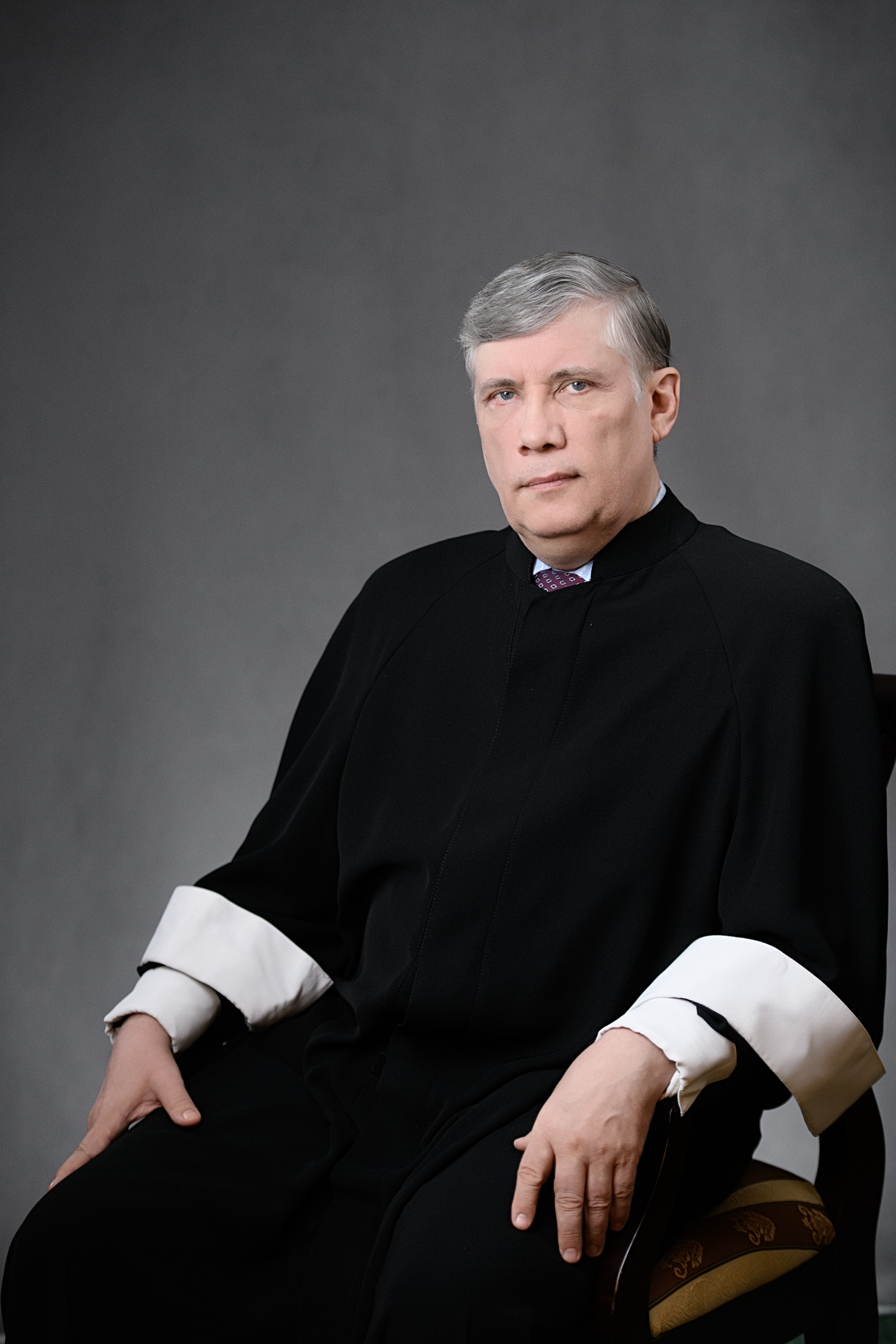
- Official portrait

Judge of the Constitutional Court of Russia
- Incumbent
- Assumed office 3 March 2010
- Nominated by: Dmitry Medvedev

Personal details
- Born: Aleksandr Nikolayevich Kokotov; 15 January 1961 (age 65) Ufimka station, Achitsky District, Sverdlovsk Oblast, Russian SFSR, Soviet Union
- Education: Sverdlovsk Law Institute
- Occupation: Judge, academic
- Awards: Order of Friendship; Honoured Lawyer of Russia

Aleksandr Nikolayevich Kokotov (Russian: Александр Николаевич Кокотов; born 15 January 1961) is a Russian jurist and scholar of constitutional law who currently serves as the judge of the Constitutional Court of Russia since 2010.

== Life and career ==
Kokotov was born at the Ufimka railway station, 8 miles south-east of the urban-type settlement of Achit in the Achitsky District of Sverdlovsk Oblast on 15 January 1961. From 1979 to 1981, he completed compulsory military service in the Armed Forces of the Soviet Union.

In 1985, he graduated with honors from the Sverdlovsk Law Institute (now Yakovlev Ural State Law University, Yekaterinburg). Until 1987, he worked as a secretary of the Komsomol committee at his alma mater.

From 1986 to 1988, Kokotov pursued postgraduate studies at Sverdlovsk Law Institute and, in 1988, defended his Candidate of Sciences (Ph.D. equivalent) thesis entitled "Local Public Organizations as Subjects of Soviet State Law". Beginning in 1988, he taught at the Department of Soviet State Law and Soviet Governance at Sverdlovsk Law Institute, initially as an instructor, then as a senior lecturer, associate professor, and later full professor. In 1995, he earned his Doctor of Sciences (habilitation) degree with a thesis entitled "The Russian Nation and Russian Statehood (Constitutional-Legal Aspects of Their Relationship)".

From 1998 to 2010, he served as Head of the Department of Constitutional Law at the Ural State Law Academy. Between 2006 and 2009, he was Editor-in-Chief of the Russian Juridical Journal.

In March 2010, Aleksandr Kokotov was appointed a Judge of the Russian Constitutional Court by the Federation Council upon nomination by President Dmitry Medvedev.

In December 2022, amid Russia's invasion of Ukraine, Kokotov was added to the European Union sanctions list for "artificially creating the image of the legitimacy of Russia's invasion of Ukraine". He had previously been included in Ukraine's sanctions list.

== Awards and honours ==
- Order of Friendship
- Honoured Lawyer of Russia
