= Andrey Bushev =

Russian judge

- Андрей Бушев
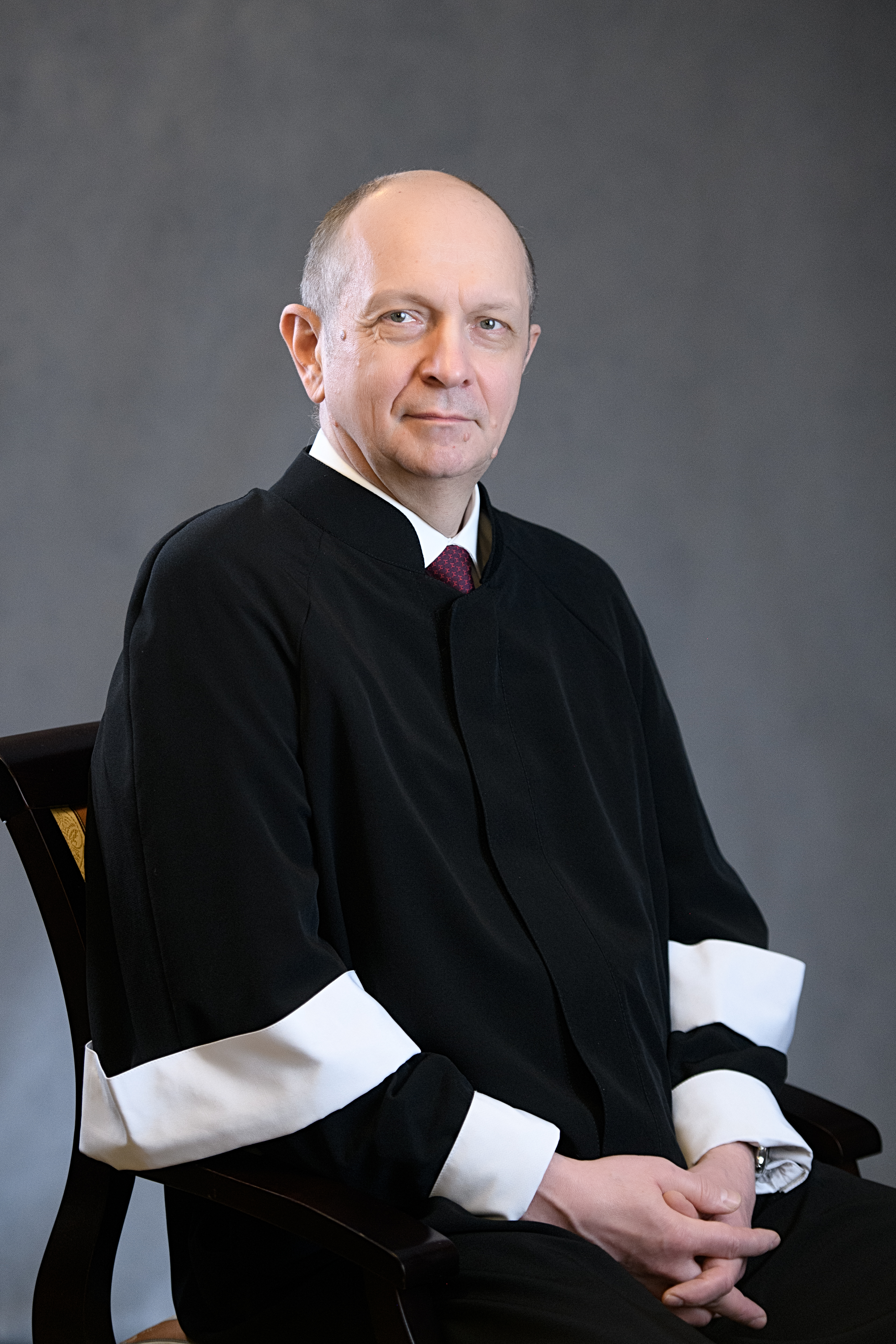
- Official portrait

Judge of the Constitutional Court of Russia
- Incumbent
- Assumed office 8 June 2022
- Nominated by: Vladimir Putin

Personal details
- Born: Andrey Yuryevich Bushev; 12 February 1966 (age 60) Leningrad, Soviet Union
- Education: Leningrad State University; University of East Anglia
- Occupation: Judge, academic

Andrey Yuryevich Bushev (Russian: Андрей Юрьевич Бушев; born 12 February 1966) is a Russian jurist and scholar of commercial law who currently serves as the judge of the Constitutional Court of Russia since 2022.

== Life and career ==
Andrey Bushev graduated from the Faculty of Law at Leningrad State University (now Saint Petersburg State University) in 1988. In 1997, he defended his thesis for the degree of Candidate of Sciences (Ph.D. equivalent) on shares under the Russian legislation. From 1996, served as an assistant, and from 2000, as an associate professor at the Department of Commercial Law. From 2019 to 2022, he has been Acting Head of the Department of Civil Law at Saint Petersburg State University. Bushev completed internships and an MBA program at foreign companies in London (1994), Paris (1995), Helsinki (1996–1997), Copenhagen (2000), Lisbon (2007), among others. In 1999, he studied at the University of East Anglia Law School.

Since 2000, he has served as an arbitrator in international and Russian arbitration tribunals, including the International Commercial Arbitration Court and the Maritime Arbitration Commission at the Russian Chamber of Commerce and Industry.

From 2003 to 2005, he headed the regional office of the World Bank Group's International Finance Corporation for the "Corporate Governance in Russia" project.

Since 2009, Bushev has been an ad hoc judge at the European Court of Human Rights. In September 2021, he was put forward as Russia’s candidate for ECtHR judgeship. Nevertheless, the PACE Committee considered Mikhail Lobov to be better qualified; Lobov would later join Bushev as a fellow judge at the Russian Constitutional Court in 2023.

In June 2022, Andrey Bushev was appointed a judge of the Constitutional Court of Russia by the Federation Council, upon nomination by President Vladimir Putin.
