= Dmitry Dedov =

Russian judge

- Дмитрий Дедов
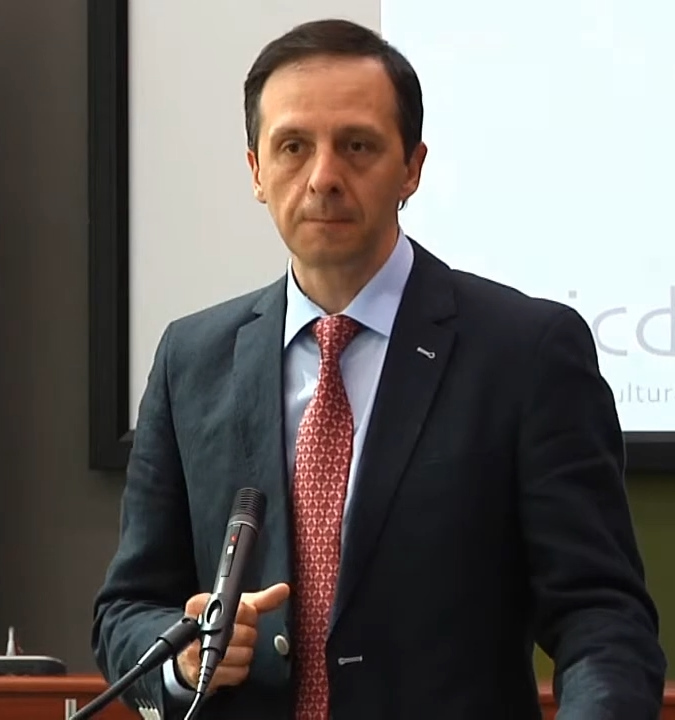
- Dedov in 2014

Judge of the European Court of Human Rights in respect of Russia
- In office 2 January 2013 – 1 January 2022
- Preceded by: Anatoly Kovler
- Succeeded by: Mikhail Lobov

Judge of the High Court of Arbitration of Russia
- In office 28 March 2008 – 1 December 2012

Personal details
- Born: Dmitry Ivanovich Dedov; 22 February 1967 (age 58) Novohrad-Volynskyi, Ukrainian SSR, Soviet Union
- Education: Moscow State University
- Occupation: Judge, academic

Dmitry Ivanovich Dedov (Russian: Дмитрий Иванович Дедов; born 22 February 1967) is a Russian judge and corporate law scholar who has served as judge of the European Court of Human Rights in respect of Russia from 2013 to 2022 and previously as judge of the Russia's High Court of Arbitration from 2008 to 2012.

== Life and career ==
Born in Novohrad-Volynskyi, Zhytomyr Oblast, Ukrainian SSR (now Zviahel, Ukraine), Dmitry Dedov is the son of Ivan Ivanovich Dedov, a prominent endocrinologist and academician of the Russian Academy of Sciences.

Dedov spent his childhood and youth in Ukraine and Kaluga Oblast. From 1974 to 1984, he attended Secondary School No. 8 in Obninsk, where he served as secretary of the school's Komsomol committee. In 1984, he enrolled at the Faculty of Law of Lomonosov Moscow State University, graduating with honors in 1991. His studies were interrupted by a two-year conscription into the Soviet Armed Forces, during which he served in the 4th Guards Tank Division (Naro-Fominsk).

In 1991, Dedov began postgraduate studies at Moscow State University. In 1994, he defended his Candidate of Sciences (Ph.D. equivalent) thesis on "Resolution of Collective Labor Disputes in Russia and the United States: A Comparative Analysis". In 2005, he earned his Doctor of Sciences (habilitation) degree with a thesis titled "The Implementation of the Proportionality Principle in the Legal Regulation of Business Activity".

After defending his thesis, Dedov was invited to join the Department of Business Law at Moscow State University as a lecturer. At the department, he taught courses on commercial law and specialized subjects, including legal regulation of the labor market, corporate law, legal regulation of entrepreneurship in the European Union, judicial protection of entrepreneurs' rights and legitimate interests.

From March 2008 to December 2012, Dedov served as a judge of Russia's High Court of Arbitration (court of final instance for commercial disputes), where he was a member of the Sixth Judicial Panel (expert division).

In October 2012, he was elected as a judge of the European Court of Human Rights in respect of Russia. In 2022 he was succeeded by Mikhail Lobov, who turned out to be the last officeholder due to Russia's withdrawal from the Council of Europe. On September 16, 2022, the ECtHR abolished the position of the judge in respect of Russia.

Since September 2022, Dedov has served as a professor at the Department of Constitutional and Municipal Law of Moscow State University.
