= Mikhail Lobov =

Russian judge

- Михаил Лобов
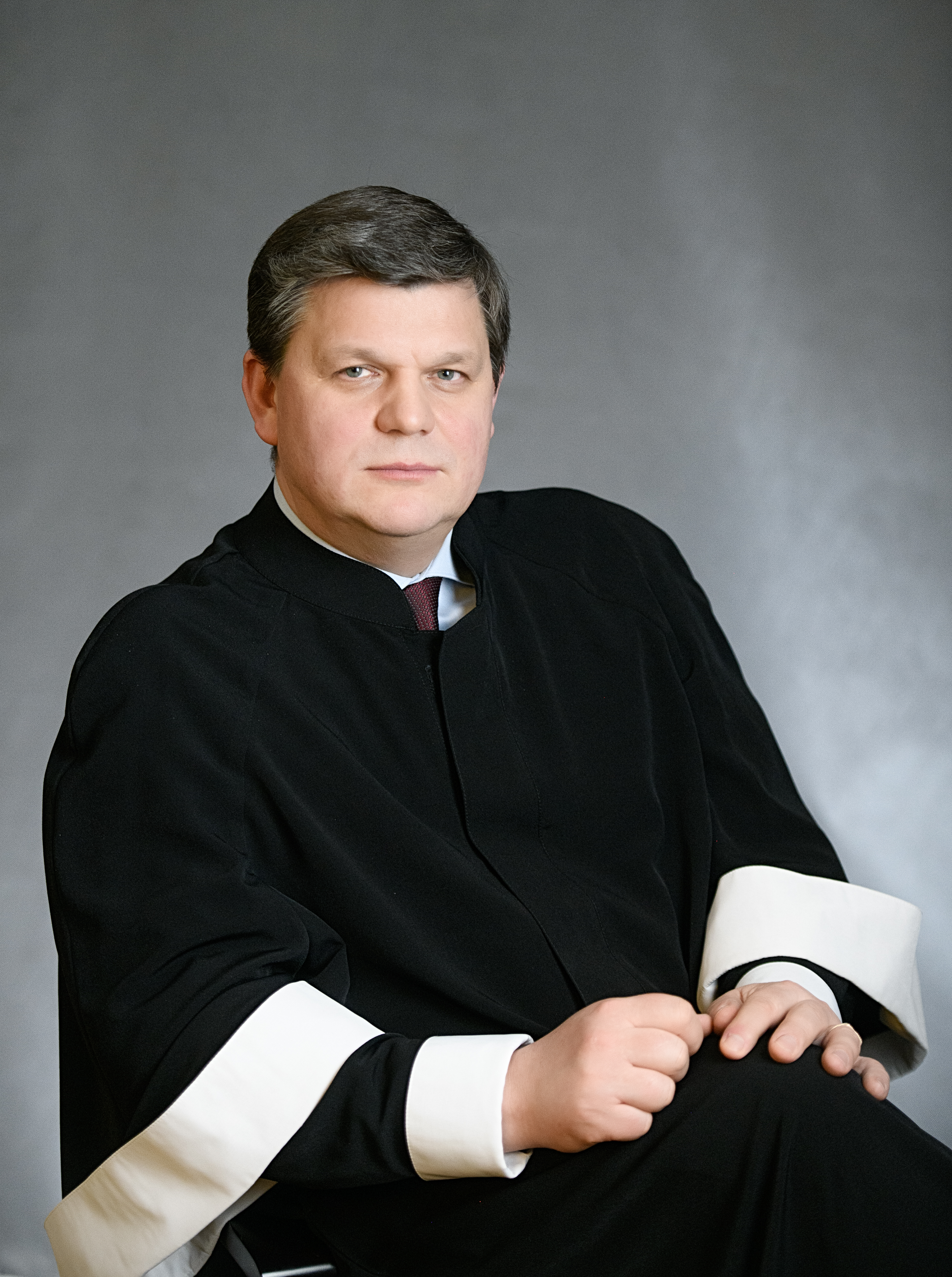
- Official portrait

Judge of the Constitutional Court of Russia
- Incumbent
- Assumed office 25 September 2023
- Nominated by: Vladimir Putin

Judge of the European Court of Human Rights in respect of Russia
- In office 2 January 2022 – 17 March 2022
- Preceded by: Dmitry Dedov
- Succeeded by: Office disestablished

Personal details
- Born: Mikhail Borisovich Lobov; 1 February 1971 (age 55) Chelyabinsk, Russian SFSR, Soviet Union
- Education: Moscow State Institute of International Relations; University of Strasbourg; Columbia University
- Occupation: Judge

Mikhail Borisovich Lobov (Russian: Михаил Борисович Лобов; born 1 February 1971) is a Russian lawyer and international law scholar who currently serves as the judge of the Constitutional Court of Russia since 2023.

== Life and career ==
Mikhail Lobov was born in Chelyabinsk, Soviet Union.

In the late 1980s, he enrolled at the Moscow State Institute of International Relations (MGIMO). From 1991 to 1992, he completed an internship in diplomatic service at the Russian Embassy in Yaoundé, Cameroon. In 1992, he graduated from the Faculty of International Law at MGIMO.

In 1995, he earned a master's degree (D.E.A.) in International Law from the Faculty of Law at the University of Strasbourg. From 1995 to 1997, he served as an associate professor of Constitutional Law at the Faculty of Law of the University of Strasbourg.

In 1997, he began working at the Council of Europe. He started his career as a legal advisor in the department for the Execution of Judgments of the European Court of Human Rights. From 1997 to 2003, he was a legal officer in the same department.

In 2004, he obtained a Master of Laws (LL.M.) from Columbia University.

From 2004 to 2006, he headed a division within the department for the Execution of Judgments of the ECtHR. From 2007 to 2014, he served as a lawyer and head of the Legal Division in the Registry of the European Court of Human Rights. In 2014, he was appointed Director of the Department of Human Rights Policy and Cooperation within the Directorate General of Human Rights and Rule of Law at the Council of Europe, a position he held until the end of 2021.

In 2021, the term of Judge Dmitry Dedov expired, prompting Russia to submit three candidates to the Parliamentary Assembly of the Council of Europe in June 2021, including Lobov. In September 2021, the relevant PACE committee recommended Lobov as the most qualified candidate for the position of ECtHR judge in respect of Russia. On September 28, Lobov received an absolute majority of votes and was elected as a judge for a nine-year term.

On January 2, 2022, Lobov assumed office, and on January 10, he took the solemn oath during a ceremony at the Human Rights Building in Strasbourg.

On March 17, 2022, the European Court of Human Rights decided to suspend Judge Mikhail Lobov's duties following Russia's withdrawal from the Council of Europe. On September 16, 2022, the ECtHR abolished the position of the judge in respect of Russia.

On September 25, 2023, upon nomination by President Vladimir Putin, he was appointed by the Federation Council as a Judge of the Constitutional Court of Russia.

In July 2025, he defended a Candidate of Sciences (Ph.D. equal) thesis on "Denunciation of the International Treaties: Legal Implications" in the Moscow State Institute of International Relations (MGIMO).
