= Order "For Merit to the Fatherland" =

National award of the Russian Federation

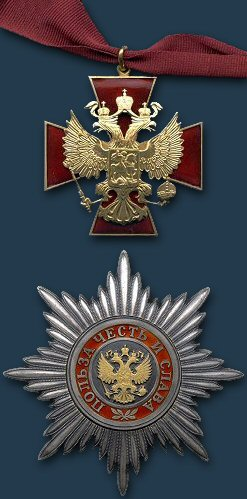
- Star and Badge of the Order "For Merit to the Fatherland"
- Type: Four grade order
- Awarded for: Outstanding contributions to the state
- Presented by: Russian Federation
- Eligibility: Russian citizens
- Status: Active
- Established: 2 March 1994
- Ribbon of the Order 1st Class Ribbon of the Order 2nd Class Ribbon of the Order 3rd Class Ribbon of the Order 4th Class

Precedence
- Next (higher): Order of St. George
- Next (lower): Order of Saint Catherine
- Related: Medal of the Order "For Merit to the Fatherland"

The Order "For Merit to the Fatherland" (Russian: Орден «За заслуги перед Отечеством», romanized: Orden "Za zaslugi pered Otechestvom") is a state decoration of the Russian Federation. It was instituted on 2 March 1994 by Presidential Decree 442. Until the re-establishment of the Order of St. Andrew in 1998, it was the highest order of the Russian Federation. The order's status was modified on 6 January 1999 by Presidential Decree 19 and again on 7 September 2010 by Presidential Decree 1099.

== Statute of the Order ==
The Order "For Merit to the Fatherland" is a mixed civilian and military order created in four classes. It is awarded for outstanding contributions to the state associated with the development of Russian statehood, advances in labour, peace, friendship and cooperation between nations, or for significant contributions to the defence of the Fatherland.

The highest of the four classes is the Order I class, the lowest being the Order IV class. These classes are awarded sequentially from the IV to the I class. Persons awarded the Order For Service to the Fatherland IV class should have already been awarded another Order of the Russian Federation and the Medal of the Order For Service to the Fatherland I class. For especially meritorious service to the State, the Order For Service to the Fatherland IV class may be conferred without previous award of the Medal of the Order For Service to the Fatherland I class if previously awarded the title "Hero of the Russian Federation", "Hero of the Soviet Union" or "Hero of Socialist Labor", as well as if previously awarded the Order of St. George, the Order of Alexander Nevsky, the Order of Suvorov, the Order of Ushakov, the Order of Zhukov, the Order of Kutuzov, the Order of Nakhimov, the Order of Courage, or who were awarded an honorary title of the Russian Federation. In exceptional cases, the President of the Russian Federation may decide to award the Order For Service to the Fatherland to persons not previously awarded state awards of the Russian Federation.

Soldiers receiving the Order "For Merit to the Fatherland" for distinction in combat will receive the Order with Swords. Although previously awarded to foreign dignitaries and heads of state such as to French President Jacques Chirac, the 2010 decree abolished this practice making Russian Federation citizens the only possible recipients.

== Award description ==
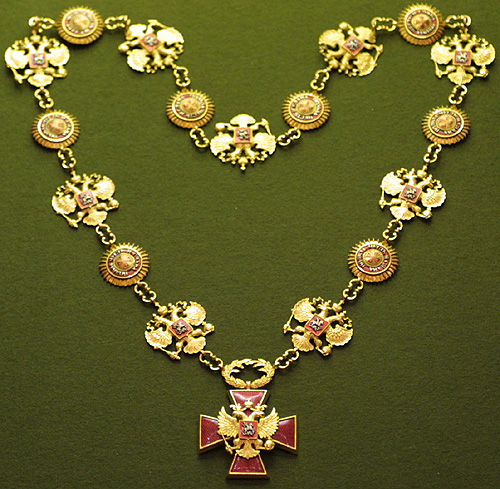
Collar of the Order "For Merit to the Fatherland", used as chain of office of the President of the Russian Federation

The order has a collar and four classes. The collar is the unique insignia of the President of the Russian Federation. The four classes of the Order are individually identified by the size and manner of wearing the two principal insignia of the Order, the cross and the star.

- Cross: Is a silver-gilt ruby-enamelled cross pattée bearing the gilt state emblem of the Russian Federation on its obverse. On the reverse of the cross is a circular medallion surrounded by the motto "BENEFIT, HONOUR, GLORY" (Russian: "ПОЛЬЗА, ЧЕСТЬ И СЛАВА"). In the center of the medallion, the year of the establishment of the Order "1994". On the reverse of the lower arm of the cross, laurel leaves and the serial number of the Order. The cross for the Order I class measures 60mm across and is affixed to a 100mm wide red sash worn over the right shoulder. The cross of the II and III classes measures 50mm across and is worn on a 45mm wide red neck ribbon for the II class, the III class ribbon is 24mm wide. The cross for the IV class measures 40mm across and hangs from a standard pentagonal mount covered by a red 24mm wide ribbon.
- Star: The star of the Order is eight pointed. 82mm across and of highly polished silver. At its center on the obverse if a circular medallion bearing the embossed gilt state emblem of the Russian Federation. Around the medallion, a red enameled band with the motto of the Order "BENEFIT, HONOUR, GLORY" (Russian: "ПОЛЬЗА, ЧЕСТЬ И СЛАВА"). The reverse has the serial number of the Order engraved on the lower arm.

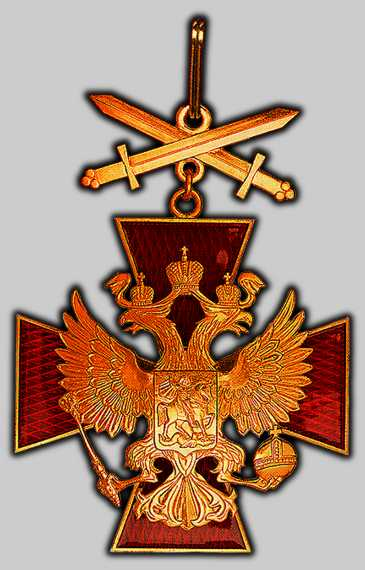
Cross with Swords

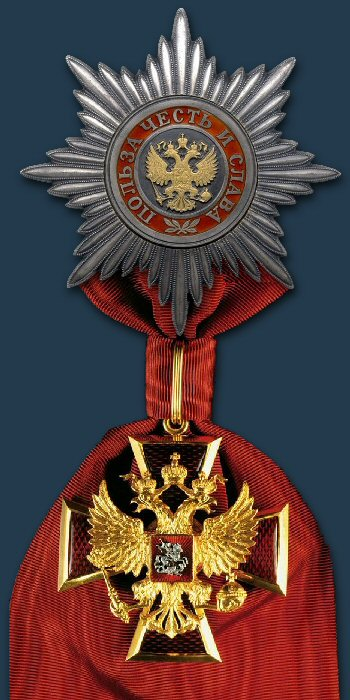
Order I class
Sash and Star

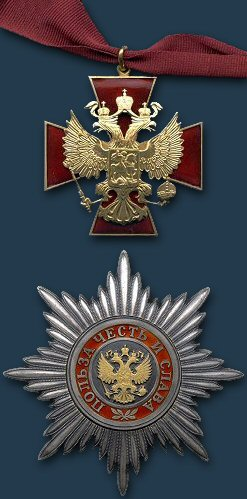
Order II class
Star and Neck Cross

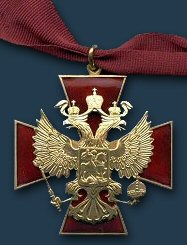
Order III class
Neck Cross

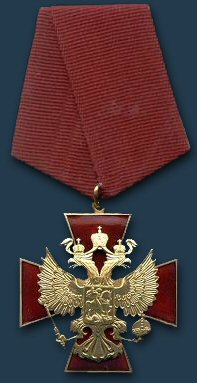
Order IV class
Breast Cross

== Full Cavaliers of the Order "For Merit to the Fatherland" (partial list) ==
A "Cavalier" (Russian: кавалер) of an Order is an individual who has received one or more but not all grades of an Order, it is synonymous to a "Knight" of a western Order. A "Full Cavalier" (Russian: полный кавалер) of an Order is an individual who has sequentially earned every Class of that Order. The individuals listed below are among those who have been so honoured:

Politicians: Dmitry Medvedev, Valentina Tereshkova, Vladimir Zhirinovsky, Viktor Chernomyrdin, Viktor Zubkov, Sergei Ivanov, Sergey Lavrov, Valentina Matviyenko, Mintimer Shaimiev, Yury Luzhkov, Nikolai Patrushev, Alexander Bortnikov, Boris Gromov, Aman Tuleyev, Eduard Rossel, Sergey Chemezov, Vitali Smirnov, Vyacheslav Lebedev, Veniamin Yakovlev, Valery Zorkin.

Artists: Eduard Khil, Ilya Glazunov, Maya Plisetskaya, Nikita Mikhalkov, Zurab Tsereteli, Yuri Temirkanov, Oleg Tabakov, Mark Zakharov, Galina Vishnevskaya, Leonid Bronevoy, Gennady Khazanov, Vladimir Zeldin, Gennady Rozhdestvensky, Lev Leshchenko, Galina Volchek, Vladimir Etush, Vladimir Fedoseyev, Inna Churikova, Vladimir Spivakov, Aleksandr Shirvindt, Tatiana Doronina, Irina Antonova, Vladimir Vinokur, Nadezhda Babkina.

Scientists: Zhores Alferov, Yury Osipov, Yuri Trutnev, Mikhail Kovalchuk, Evgeny Velikhov, Viktor Sadovnichiy, Yevgeniy Chazov, Georgy Tolstoy.

Others: Viktor Savinykh, Viktor Vekselberg, Alexander Maslyakov, Metropolitan Juvenal, Konstantin Ernst, Eduard Khudaynatov, Petr Yan

== See also ==
- Awards and decorations of the Russian Federation
