= Russian State University of Justice =

University in Russia

Coordinates: 55°39′48″N 37°33′42″E

- Российский государственный университет правосудия
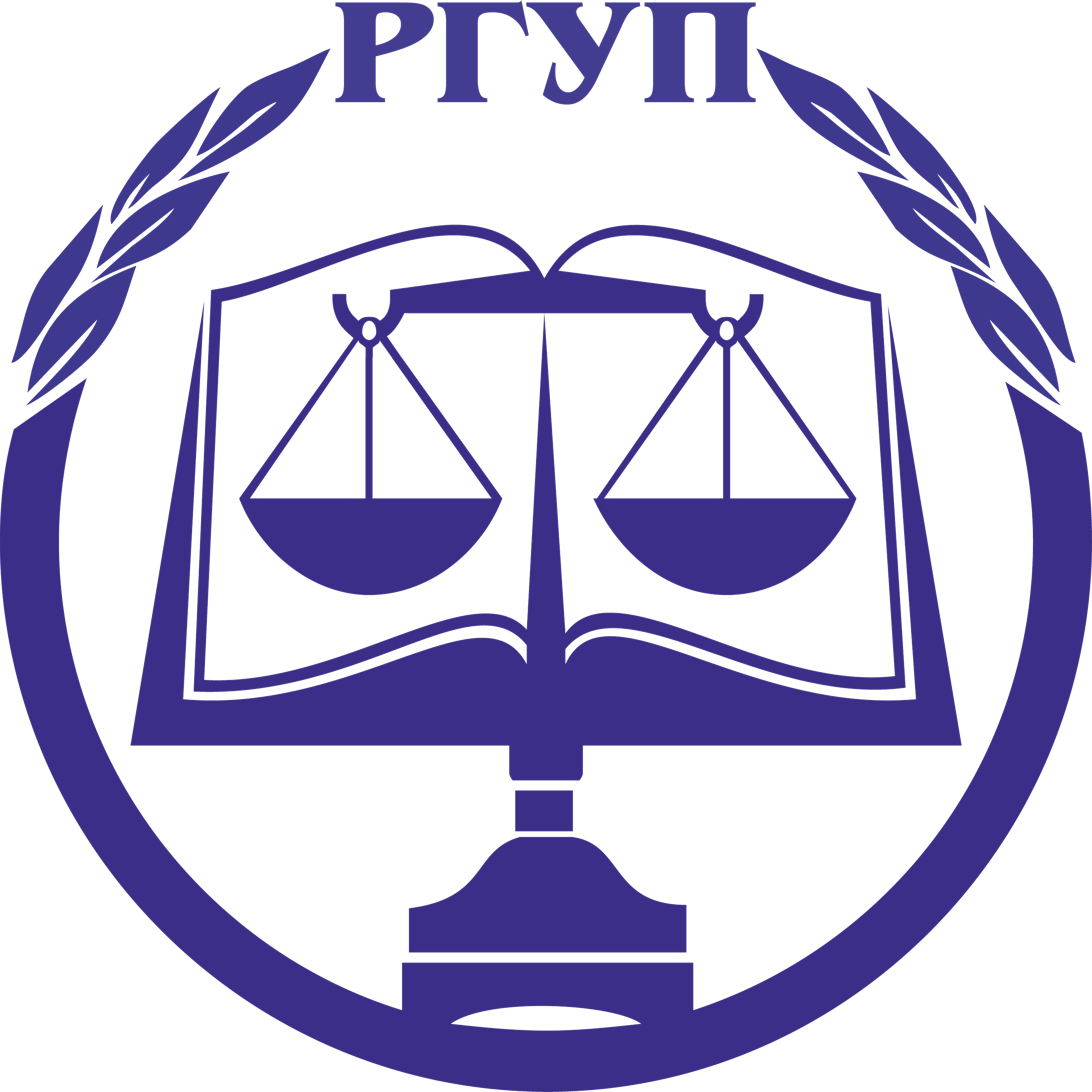
- logo
- Other names: RSUJ
- Former names: Russian Academy of Justice (RAJ, Российская Академия Правосудия)
- Type: Public
- Established: 1998
- Rector: O. Tisen
- Location: Moscow, Russia
- Campus: urban, multiple sites
- Website: http://www.rgup.ru/

The Russian State University of Justice is a university that trains the members and candidates of the judiciary (judges and court officials) of Russia. Until 2014, it was the Russian Academy of Justice, which was founded in 1998 after a decree from the president of the Russian Federation. The word for "justice" in its name is правосудия (pravosudiya).

== Branches ==
It has eleven branches:

- Chelyabinsk: the Ural Branch (Уральский филиал / Ural'skiy Filial)
- Irkutsk: the East Siberian Branch (Восточно-Сибирский филиал / Vostochno-Sibirskiy Filial)
- Kazan: the Kazan Branch (Казанский филиал / Kazanskiy Filial)
- Khabarovsk: the Far Eastern Branch (Дальневосточный филиал / Dal'nevostochnyy Filial)
- Krasnodar: the North Caucasian Branch (Северо-Кавказский филиал / Severo-Kavkazskiy Filial)
- Nizhny Novgorod: the Volga Branch (Приволжский филиал / Privolzhskiy Filial)
- Rostov-on-Don: the Rostov Branch (Ростовский филиал / Rostovskiy Filial)
- Saint Petersburg: the Northwestern Branch (Северо-Западный филиал / Severo-Zapadnyy Filial)
  - inside Alexander Park, next to the Artillery Museum
- Simferopol: the Crimean Branch (Крымский филиал / Krymskiy Filial)
- Tomsk: the West Siberian Branch (Западно-Сибирский филиал / Zapadno-Sibirskiy Filial)
- Voronezh: the Central Branch (Центральный филиал / Tsentral'nyy Filial)
