= Saint Petersburg University of the Ministry of Internal Affairs of Russia =

Saint Petersburg University of the MVD
- Санкт-Петербургский университет МВД России
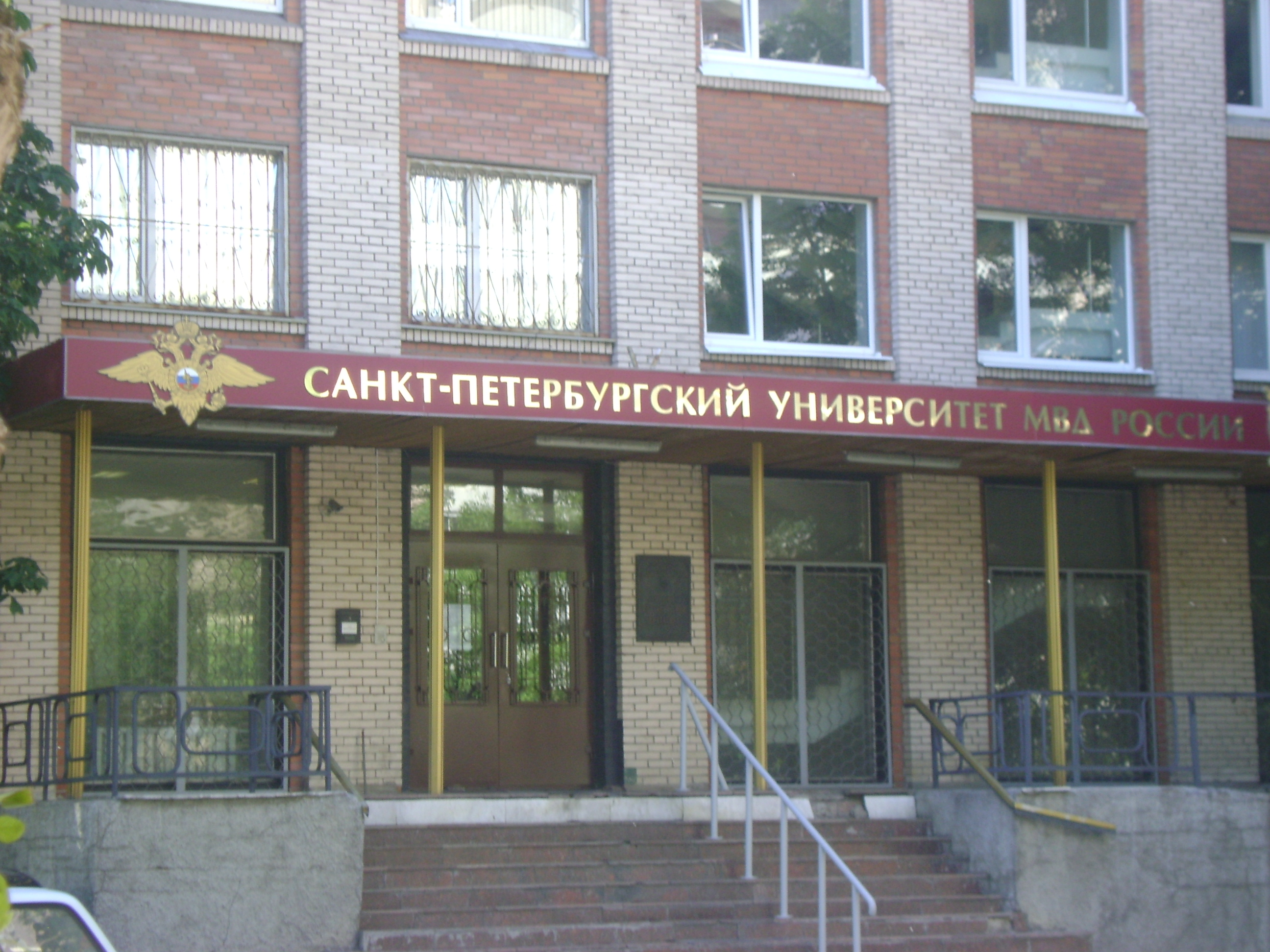
- Type: University
- Established: 1968
- Affiliations: Ministry of Internal Affairs
- Students: 8,000+
- Location: 1 Lyotchika Pilyutova str., Saint Petersburg, Russia; 59°50′35″N 30°08′13″E
- Campus: Urban

Federal State Budgetary Educational Institution of Higher Education "Saint Petersburg University of the Ministry of Internal Affairs of the Russian Federation" (Russian: Федеральное государственное казенное образовательное учреждение высшего образования «Санкт-Петербургский университет Министерства внутренних дел Российской Федерации») is a higher educational institution of Saint Petersburg, a departmental educational institution of the Ministry of Internal Affairs of the Russian Federation, engaged in the training, retraining and advanced training of personnel for the internal affairs agencies of Russia and foreign countries.

The university was founded in 1968 as the Higher Political School of the Ministry of Internal Affairs of the Soviet Union. In 1992, the school was divided into the Saint Petersburg Military Institute of Internal Troops of the Ministry of Internal Affairs of Russia and the Saint Petersburg Law Institute of the Ministry of Internal Affairs. On the basis of the latter, as well as the Saint Petersburg Higher School of the Ministry of Internal Affairs of the Russian Federation and the Institute for Advanced Training of Employees of the Ministry of Internal Affairs of the Russian Federation, in 1996 the Saint Petersburg Academy of the Ministry of Internal Affairs was created, which two years later received the status of a university. The institution is the first of the universities in the system of the Ministry of Internal Affairs of Russia.

== History ==
The history of both educational institutions (University of the Ministry of Internal Affairs and the Institute of Internal Troops) dates back to 1944, when the Central School of the Soviet Ministry of Internal Affairs was founded. Since 1947, the school was based in Znamenka, Leningrad Region (now within the city limits). In 1952, the school was awarded a high state distinction - the Red Banner. Since 1958, the school has been preparing graduates in two areas: cultural and educational work in correctional labor institutions and political training of officers of the internal troops. In 1963, by order of the Ministry of Public Security of the RSFSR, the school was given an annual holiday - October 12.

In 1968, the Znamenka School was given the status of a higher educational institution and the name of the Higher Political School of the Soviet Ministry of Internal Affairs. The school was engaged in retraining (advanced training) in two areas: officers with higher legal education were trained for the Ministry of Internal Affairs bodies, and officers with higher military special education were trained for the internal troops. During the period from 1968 to 1992, the Higher Military Training School of the Ministry of Internal Affairs graduated more than 20 thousand officers-political workers.

In 1992, the school was divided into several higher education institutions. The Saint Petersburg Military Institute of the Internal Troops of the Ministry of Internal Affairs of Russia was separated from it. In accordance with order of the Government of Russia No. 398 of June 11, 1992, the Saint Petersburg Law Institute of the Ministry of Internal Affairs of the Russian Federation was created. In 1996, the Law Institute was merged with the Saint Petersburg Higher School of the Ministry of Internal Affairs of the Russian Federation and the Institute for Advanced Training of Employees of the Ministry of Internal Affairs. On their basis, by Government Resolution No. 1361, the Academy of the Ministry of Internal Affairs of the Russian Federation was created.

On June 18, 1998, the Academy received its current status, the Saint Petersburg University of the Ministry of Internal Affairs of Russia.

In 2000, based on the Order of the Government of the Russian Federation of March 2, 2000 No. 320 and the Order of the Minister of Internal Affairs of the Russian Federation of March 24, 2000 No. 013, the St. Petersburg Military Institute of the Internal Troops of the Ministry of Internal Affairs of Russia was re-established on the basis of the faculty for training personnel for the internal troops of the St. Petersburg University of the Ministry of Internal Affairs of Russia.

Over the years of its existence, the university has graduated many officers, many of whom headed various departments in the system of the Ministry of Internal Affairs and other law enforcement agencies. More than 60 graduates of the university have general ranks. Six graduates of the university were awarded the highest state awards of the country - the title of Hero of the Soviet Union and Hero of Russia. Officers and employees of the university participated in various military operations and civil defense activities, including the war in Afghanistan, the liquidation of the consequences of the Chernobyl accident, military operations in the Caucasus and Chechnya.

In 2011, the university confirmed its status as a university, having successfully passed state and public accreditation.

At present, the university trains investigators, operatives, district police officers, forensic experts, economists, psychologists, youth workers, information security engineers for the internal affairs agencies.
