= Constitutional Court of Russia =

Russian constitutional court

- Конституционный Суд Российской Федерации
- Coat of Arms of Russia

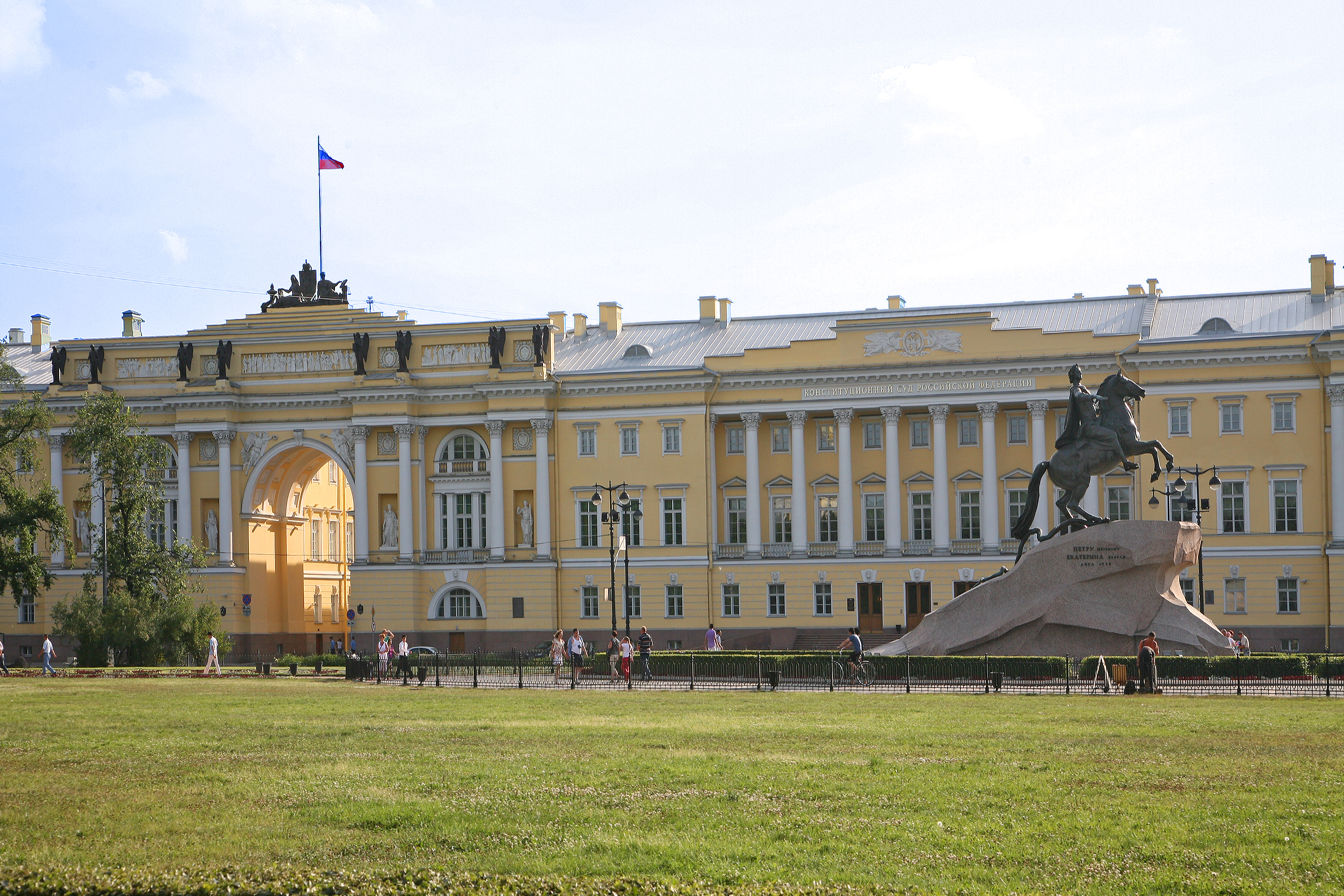
- Constitutional Court building in Saint Petersburg
- Interactive map of Constitutional Court of Russia
- 59°56′09″N 30°18′02″E
- Established: July 12, 1991; 35 years ago
- Location: 1 Senate Square, Saint Petersburg
- Coordinates: 59°56′09″N 30°18′02″E
- Composition method: Appointment by Federation Council with nomination by President of Russia
- Authorised by: Constitution of Russia
- Judge term length: Mandatory retirement at age 70 for regular judges and 76 for the Deputy President of the Court
- Number of positions: 11, by law (including the President and the Deputy President)
- Website: ksrf.ru

President
- Currently: Valery Zorkin
- Since: 21 February 2003
- Lead position ends: 6 years, renewable
- Jurist term ends: No tenure or age limits

Deputy President
- Currently: Aleksandr Konovalov
- Since: 1 October 2026

The Constitutional Court of the Russian Federation (Russian: Конституционный Суд Российской Федерации) is a high court within the judiciary of Russia which is empowered to rule on whether certain laws or presidential decrees are in fact contrary to the Constitution of Russia. Its objective is only to protect the Constitution (in Russian constitutional law this function is known as "constitutional control" or "constitutional supervision") and deal with a few kinds of disputes where it has original jurisdiction, whereas the highest court of appeal is the Supreme Court of Russia.

== History ==
Before the 1980s in the USSR the importance of judicial supervision over compatibility of legislation and executive actions with the provisions and principles of the constitution was not recognized. It was not until December 25, 1989 when Constitutional Control in the USSR Act was passed, that such "judicial review" was initiated. Accordingly, the Constitutional Supervision Committee was created. It started functioning mid-1990 and was dissolved towards the end of 1991. In December 1990 the Constitution of the Russian Soviet Federated Socialist Republic (RSFSR) was amended with provisions which provided for creation of Constitutional Court (whereas a similar USSR body was called a Committee, not a Court). On July 12, 1991 Constitutional Court of the RSFSR Act was adopted. In October the Fifth Congress of People's Deputies of the Russian SFSR has elected 13 members of the Court and the Constitutional Court de facto started functioning. From November 1991 till October 1993 it rendered some decisions of great significance. For example, it declared unconstitutional certain decrees of Presidium of the Supreme Soviet, which were adopted ultra vires, and forbade the practice of extrajudicial eviction. More often, however, it declared President Yeltsin's decrees unconstitutional, leading critics to argue it took the side of the Supreme Soviet in the power struggle.

On October 7, 1993 Boris Yeltsin's decree suspended work of the Constitutional Court. According to the decree, the Constitutional Court was "in deep crisis". On December 24 another presidential decree repealed the Constitutional Court of the RSFSR Act itself. In July 1994 the new Constitutional Court Act was adopted. However, the new Constitutional Court started working only in February 1995, because the Federation Council of Russia refused several times to appoint judges nominated by Yeltsin.

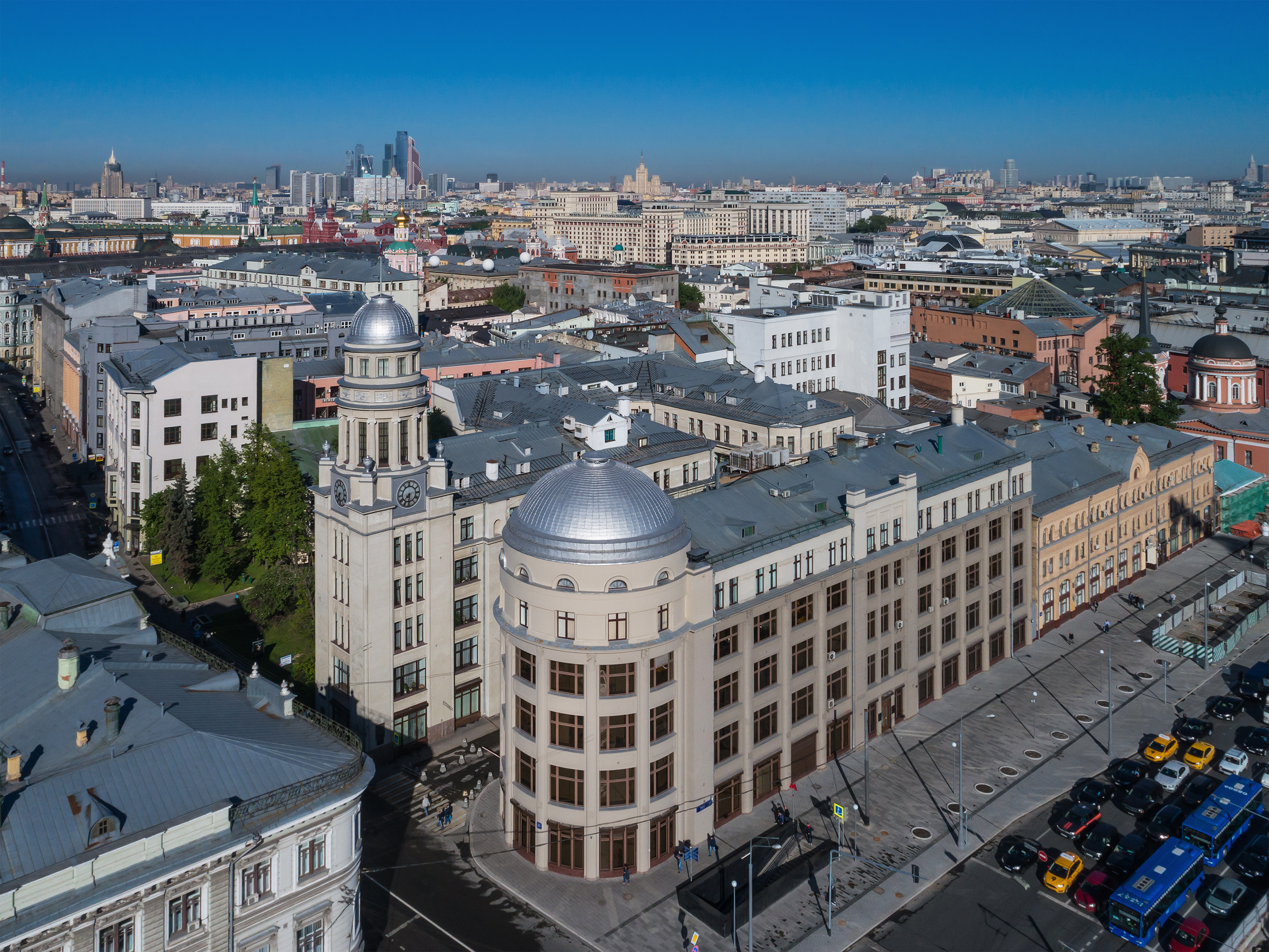
Former headquarters of the Constitutional Court in Kitai-gorod of Moscow, by Marian Peretiatkovich and Fyodor Rerberg

In 2005 the federal authorities proposed to transfer the court from Moscow to Saint Petersburg. The transfer, involving controversial allocation of land on Krestovsky Island for cottages of the judges and relocation of the Russian State Historical Archive from the former Senate and Synod Building, now occupied by the court headquarters, had been completed by 2008.

President Dmitry Medvedev on May 8, 2009, proposed to the legislature and on June 2 signed a law for an amendment whereby the president of the court and his deputies would be proposed to the parliament by the president rather than elected by the judges, as was the case before.

Constitutional Court Judge Vladimir Yaroslavtsev in an interview to the Spanish newspaper El País published on August 31, 2009, claimed that the presidential executive office and security services had undermined judicial independence in Russia. In October the Constitutional Court in an unprecedented motion accused Yaroslavtsev of "undermining the authority of the judiciary" in violation of the judicial code and forced him to resign from the Council of Judges. Judge Anatoly Kononov, who had frequently dissented from decisions taken by the majority of the court, in his interview to Sobesednik supported Yaroslavtsev, claiming that there was no independent judiciary in Russia and criticized the new amendments concerning appointment of the court president as undemocratic. The Constitutional Court forced Kononov to step down from the Constitutional Court on January 1, 2010, 7 years ahead of schedule.

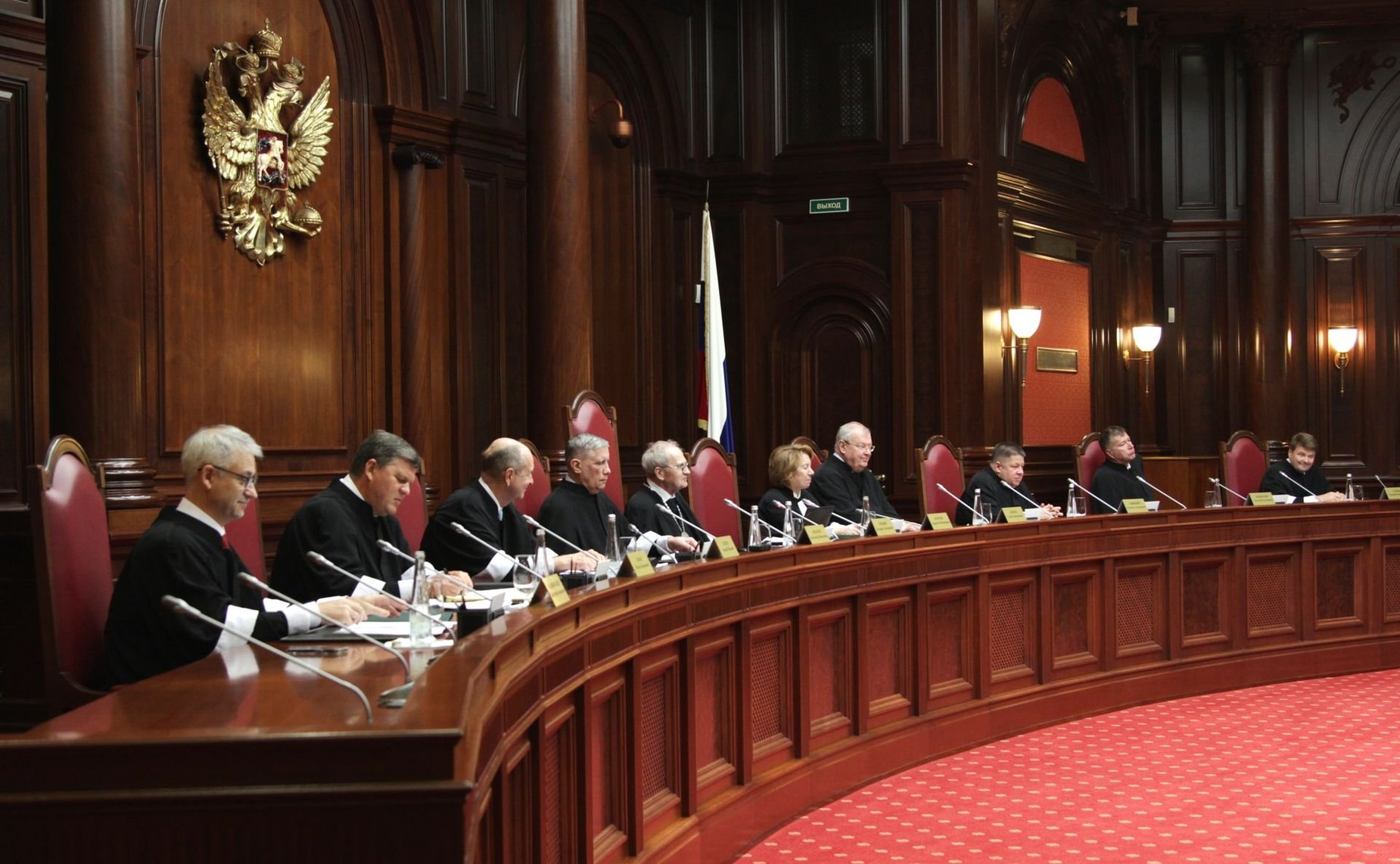
Constitutional Court session in Saint Petersburg, 7 October 2025

== Composition ==
The Constitutional Court of the Russian Federation consists of 11 judges (with the quorum of 8), one being the President (currently Valery Zorkin) and another one being Deputy President. The President presides over the court's sessions, represents the court in its relations with state bodies, has considerable powers in the matters of appointment, and makes the initial recommendation for disciplinary measures, in particular dismissal.

The judges are nominated by the President and appointed by the Federation Council for an indefinite term with the age limit of 70 for regular judges and 76 for the Deputy President of the Court (the President of the Court has no age limit). In order to become a judge of the Constitutional Court a person must be a citizen of Russia, at least 40 years of age, have legal education, have served as a lawyer for at least 15 years and have "recognized high qualification" (quotation from Constitutional Court Act) in law.

Constitutionality of laws, disputes concerning competence of governmental agencies, impeachment of the president of Russia and the Constitutional Court's proposals of legislations must be dealt with in plenary session. The Constitutional Court also may by its discretion submit to plenary sessions any other issue.

== Powers ==
Certain powers of the Constitutional Court are enumerated in the Constitution of Russia. The Constitutional Court declares laws, presidential and governmental decrees and laws of federal subjects unconstitutional if it finds that they are contrary to the Constitution (i.e. they violate certain rights and freedoms of citizens enumerated in and protected by the Constitution). In such instances, that particular law becomes unenforceable, and governmental agencies are barred from implementing it. Also, before an international treaty is ratified by the State Duma, the constitutionality of the treaty may be observed by the Constitutional Court. The Constitutional Court is not entitled to judge constitutionality of laws on its own initiative; the law may be submitted to the Constitutional Court by the President of Russia, the government of Russia, the State Duma, the Federation Council, one-fifth of deputies of the State Duma or the Federation Council, the Supreme Court of the Russian Federation, or a legislative body of a federal subject. Any federal court may request the Constitutional Court to judge on the constitutionality of a law if the law is to be implemented in a case, and a judge of the federal court is in doubt about whether the law is contrary to the Constitution. Also, any private citizen may submit in the Constitutional Court a claim challenging constitutionality of a particular law if that law was implemented in a particular case and thus violated rights of that citizen.

Another power of the Constitutional Court is to resolve disputes concerning competence of governmental agencies. Whenever the President of Russia is impeached, the Constitutional Court renders a resolution concerning complying with the due order of indictment.

== Procedure ==
The Constitutional Court deals with cases either in chambers or in plenary sessions. All judges must be present unless they are sick or may have interest in the case; they must not abstain from voting on the resolution. Apart from judges, claimant, his representatives and governmental agencies involved are present. In order for resolution or decision to pass two-thirds of judges must be in favor of it.

== Court presidents ==
- Valery Zorkin (1991–1993)
- Nikolay Vitruk (acting, 1993–1995)
- Vladimir Tumanov (1995–1997)
- Marat Baglai (1997–2003)
- Valery Zorkin (since 2003)

== Current judges ==
| Portrait | Judge | Alma mater | Nominated by | Start date / length of service | Age at start / present | | Background |
|---|---|---|---|---|---|---|---|
| | President; Valery Zorkin (b. 1943) | Moscow State University | Congress of People's Deputies of Russia | October 29, 1991; 35 years, 24 days | 48 | 83 | University professor |
| | Deputy President; Aleksandr Konovalov (b. 1968) | Saint Petersburg State University | Vladimir Putin | April 16, 2025; 1 year, 220 days | 56 | 58 | Civil servant, prosecutor |
| | Sergey Knyazev (b. 1959) | Far Eastern State University | Dmitry Medvedev | October 15, 2008; 18 years, 38 days | 49 | 67 | University professor, civil servant |
| | Aleksandr Kokotov (b. 1961) | Ural State Law University | Dmitry Medvedev | March 3, 2010; 16 years, 264 days | 49 | 65 | University professor |
| | Andrey Bushev (b. 1966) | Saint Petersburg State University | Vladimir Putin | June 8, 2022; 4 years, 167 days | 56 | 60 | University professor, arbitrator, judge |
| | Vladimir Sivitsky (b. 1974) | Moscow State University | Vladimir Putin | June 21, 2023; 3 years, 154 days | 48 | 52 | University professor, civil servant |
| | Mikhail Lobov (b. 1971) | Moscow State Institute of International Relations | Vladimir Putin | September 25, 2023; 3 years, 58 days | 52 | 55 | Judge, university professor |
| | Konstantin Kalinovsky (b. 1971) | Saint Petersburg University of the Ministry of Internal Affairs of Russia | Vladimir Putin | July 16, 2025; 1 year, 129 days | 53 | 54 | University professor, civil servant |
| | Yevgeny Taribo (b. 1976) | Ural State Law University | Vladimir Putin | July 16, 2025; 1 year, 129 days | 49 | 49 | University professor, civil servant |
| | Victoria Korobchenko (b. 1975) | Saint Petersburg State University | Vladimir Putin | July 24, 2026; 121 days | 50 | 50 | University professor, civil servant |

== Presidential Envoys to the Constitutional Court ==
In 1995, by Presidential Decree, Boris Yeltsin introduced the post of Plenipotentiary representative of the President of the Russian Federation to the Constitutional Court of the Russian Federation into the Presidential Administration. According to the regulations on the plenipotentiary representative of the President of the Russian Federation to the Constitutional Court of the Russian Federation, the President's representative participates in meetings of the Constitutional Court, represents the President of the Russian Federation in constitutional proceedings, coordinates the activities of persons appointed by representatives of the President of the Russian Federation to participate in the consideration of specific cases by the Constitutional Court of the Russian Federation, etc.

- Valery Savitsky (April 24, 1995, – February 5, 1996)
- Mikhail Mityukov (February 5 – December 7, 1996)
- Sergey Shakhray (December 7, 1996, – June 29, 1998)
- Mikhail Mityukov (June 29, 1998, – November 7, 2005)
- Mikhail Krotov (November 7, 2005 – January 31, 2020)
- Aleksandr Konovalov (January 31, 2020 – April 16, 2025)
- Dmitry Mezentsev (since April 17, 2025)

== Governmental Envoys to the Constitutional Court ==
- Stanislav Yudushkin (November 9, 1998, – March 12, 2001)
- Mikhail Barshchevsky (March 12, 2001 – December 26, 2025)
- Pavel Stepanov (acting since December 29, 2025)

== Decision-making and its legal framework ==
The decisions and opinions of the Constitutional Court are issued in the name of the Russian Federation. During its existence, it has adopted tens of thousands (more than 46 thousand) resolutions, definitions, decisions and conclusions.

From 1995 to 2024, the Constitutional Court of the Russian Federation received more than 424 thousand appeals.

The Constitutional Court often combines complaints and (or) requests from different applicants concerning the same subject into one case. Therefore, in 2014, 1 ruling was also issued on complaints from several legal entities and a court request combined into one case, 1 ruling was issued on a request from the Commissioner for Human Rights in the Russian Federation, complaints from several citizens and one legal entity combined into one case, 1 ruling on complaints from several citizens and one legal entity.

When making new decisions, the normative and legal basis is not only the text of the Constitution of the Russian Federation, but also the decisions and rulings previously adopted by the Constitutional Court.

The Constitutional Court also sometimes refers to the norms of international documents of the UN and the Council of Europe. For example, the Constitutional Court Resolution No. 28-P of November 11, 2014 mentions the Declaration of Basic Principles of Justice for Victims of Crime and Abuse of Power, adopted by the UN General Assembly on November 29, 1985.

=== Making decisions without a court hearing ===
The Federal constitutional law "On the Constitutional Court of the Russian Federation" provides for the consideration of cases by the Constitutional Court of the Russian Federation in an open court session. However, in 2010, Article 47.1 was introduced into this law, which allowed the Constitutional Court of the Russian Federation to consider cases "without holding a hearing", that is, in a session without the participation of the parties and without the admission of outsiders. Currently, most of the decisions of the Constitutional Court of the Russian Federation are made without holding a hearing. For example, out of 55 decisions made by the Constitutional Court of the Russian Federation in 2021, only 5 decisions (No. 30-P, 35-P, 38-P, 45-P and 48-P) were adopted in an open court session, and the rest were adopted without holding a hearing.

=== Legal consequences of decisions ===
The decision of the Constitutional Court is a normative act of direct action, which is superior to any federal constitutional law and federal law and is not subject to appeal. The legal consequences of the issuance of a Ruling of the Constitutional Court are as follows:

1. Review of previously adopted court decisions on the applicant's case. This is usually indicated in the operative part of the Constitutional Court's Resolution. Such review occurs through the applicant's filing an application with the court of first instance that considered his case. In this case, the case can be re-examined by the same panel of judges that rejected the applicant during the initial consideration of the case. Example. In 2013, the Constitutional Court, following complaints from citizens (dismissed employees) K. M. Shcherbina, O. A. Kurashkin and others, partially recognized as unconstitutional the provisions of the Labor Code that allow the termination of a contract with an employee of an educational organization who had a criminal record (Resolution No. 19-P of 18.07.2013) and indicated that the applicants' cases are subject to review. The applicant K. M. Shcherbina took advantage of this right and was reinstated at work with payment for forced absence (and partial compensation for the costs of the state fee and the representative in the Constitutional Court) by the same judge who had previously refused to reinstate him in the same case.
2. Establishment of new legal norms and procedures. The Constitutional Court sometimes actually introduces new legal norms. For example, in the Resolution of February 17, 2015, the Constitutional Court established that a repeat prosecutorial inspection of a non-profit organization is not allowed based on the same facts that were in the initial inspection (except for cases of inspection of the elimination of violations of laws, conducted within a reasonable time after their discovery).
3. Review of court decisions in cases of persons who are not the applicants, in which a law recognized as unconstitutional was applied (since 2020). In 2020, the Constitutional Court established that the right to review a decision in a civil case based on a ruling of the Constitutional Court of the Russian Federation is available not only to the applicant, but also to any person in whose case a provision was applied, recognized by the ruling of the Constitutional Court of the Russian Federation as fully or partially unconstitutional.
4. Cancellation of existing legal norms and the obligation of the federal legislator to amend legal norms within a specified period. Sometimes the Constitutional Court orders the authorities to change laws and sometimes strictly limits the period for eliminating identified violations in legislation. For example, in the Resolution of December 11, 2014, the Constitutional Court obliged the federal legislator to make certain changes to Article 159.4 of the Criminal Code of the Russian Federation within six months. At the same time, the court established that "if, after the expiration of a six-month period from the date of the proclamation of this Resolution, the federal legislator does not make the appropriate changes to the Criminal Code of the Russian Federation, Article 159.4 of this Code shall lose force."

There is only one known case when the Supreme Court of the Russian Federation ignored the position of the Constitutional Court of the Russian Federation and refused to review the applicant's case, despite the fact that the Constitutional Court of the Russian Federation indicated in its ruling the need to review the court decisions made against the applicant. In May 2021, the Constitutional Court of the Russian Federation found, based on the complaint of citizen Irina Nikiforova (she was brought to trial by a court of general jurisdiction under Part 2 of Article 20.2 of the Code of the Russian Federation on Administrative Offenses), that the norms applied in Nikiforova's case contradicted the Constitution of the Russian Federation and in its ruling indicated the need to review the court decisions made against Nikiforova. However, in the decision of the Supreme Court of the Russian Federation, the review of Nikiforova's case was denied, and the ruling of the Constitutional Court of the Russian Federation was not even mentioned.

=== Review of the decision of the Constitutional Court of the Russian Federation ===
The decision of the Constitutional Court of the Russian Federation is final and not subject to appeal.

If new complaints are received on a previously verified legal norm, the Constitutional Court refuses to accept them for consideration with reference to a previously issued ruling or resolution. However, in 2015, the body accepted for consideration the complaint of S. V. Makhin on Article 237 of the Criminal Procedure Code of the Russian Federation, stating the following: "the issue raised by the applicant had previously been raised in complaints sent to the Constitutional Court of the Russian Federation, on which decisions were made, however, in connection with the continued receipt of appeals on the violation of the constitutional rights of citizens by the said norms, and also taking into account the established practice of their application, the Constitutional Court of the Russian Federation considers it possible to return to the issue of their constitutionality and accept the complaint of S. V. Makhin for consideration."

== Transfer from Moscow to St. Petersburg ==
The proposal to move the court from Moscow to St. Petersburg was put forward in October 2005 by the Chairman of the Federation Council Sergei Mironov.

On February 5, 2007, the President of the Russian Federation signed Federal Constitutional Law No. 2-FKZ on changing the permanent location of the Constitutional Court from Moscow to St. Petersburg.

On December 23, 2007, the Decree of the President of the Russian Federation "On the Permanent Location of the Constitutional Court of the Russian Federation" was issued, which established that the Court's move should be completed between February 1 and May 20, 2008.

The court was located in the building of the Senate and Synod.

== Amendments to legislation in pursuance of decisions of the Constitutional Court ==
According to Article 80 of the Federal Constitutional Law "On the Constitutional Court of the Russian Federation", if a normative act is recognized by a ruling of the Constitutional Court of the Russian Federation as not in compliance with the Constitution of the Russian Federation in whole or in part, or if the ruling requires eliminating a gap or contradiction, then the Government of the Russian Federation must submit a draft new federal law (amendments to the current law) to the State Duma of the Russian Federation no later than six months after the publication of the ruling of the Constitutional Court of the Russian Federation. This deadline is not always met. The Ministry of Justice of the Russian Federation reported that as of August 25, 2022, 50 rulings of the Constitutional Court of the Russian Federation were being implemented, of which 27 rulings resulted in a bill being submitted to the State Duma, and federal executive bodies were carrying out "the necessary work" on 23 rulings. At the same time, in 2021 and 2022 (as of November 2, 2022), the Constitutional Court of the Russian Federation issued 43 decisions requiring execution by adopting a draft regulatory legal act.

== See also ==
- Constitutional law
- Judiciary of Russia
- Law of the Russian Federation
- Legal reform
- Rule of law
- Rule According to Higher Law
- Supreme Court of the Russian Federation
- List of constitutional courts
