= Russian Federation Presidential Certificate of Honour =

Honorary award bestowed by the President of Russia

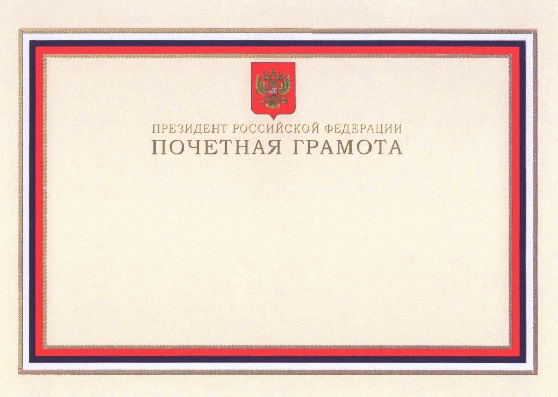
- Russian Federation Presidential Certificate of Honour
- Type: State Decoration
- Awarded for: Noteworthy service to the fatherland
- Presented by: Russian Federation
- Eligibility: Citizens of the Russian Federation
- Status: Active
- Established: 11 April 2008
- First award: 11 July 2008
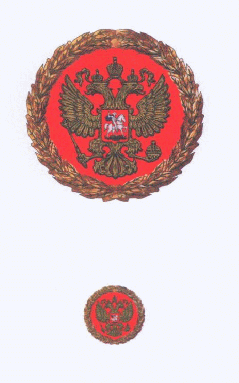
- Badge of the Russian Federation Presidential Certificate of Honour

The Russian Federation Presidential Certificate of Honour (Russian: Почётная грамота Президента Российской Федерации) is an honorary award bestowed by the President of the Russian Federation to deserving citizens. It was established by Presidential Decree No.487 of 11 April 2008. The statute and regulations governing this award were amended on two occasions, first on 12 January 2010 by Presidential Decree No.59 and again on 14 January 2011 by Presidential Decree No. 38.

== Statute ==
In accordance with regulations, the Certificate of Honour is a form of promotion and public recognition:

"For noteworthy service in defence of the Fatherland and ensuring the security of the state, for strengthening the rule of law, health and life, for protection of the rights and freedoms of citizens, for contributions in public construction, in the economy, science, culture, the arts, education, sports, charities and other services to the state"

The Certificate of Honour is awarded during an official ceremony by the President or from his name by the other government official. Recipients of the Russian Federation Presidential Certificate of Honour also receive a badge for wear on civilian clothing.

== Award description ==
The certificate is rectangular and bordered by the national colours of Russia, white blue and red. At top center, the coat of arms of the Russian Federation, immediately below it, the inscription in gold letters on two lines "Russian Federation Presidential Certificate of Honour" (Russian: Почётная грамота Президента Российской Федерации). The recipient's name and the award citation follow below.

The badge is circular, 20mm in diameter and struck from silver. Its ruby enamelled obverse bears the gilt Emblem of Russia within a gilt laurel wreath. Each award is serialised on the reverse.

== See also ==
- Awards and decorations of the Russian Federation
