= Honoured Lawyer of Russia =

Honoured Lawyer of the Russian Federation
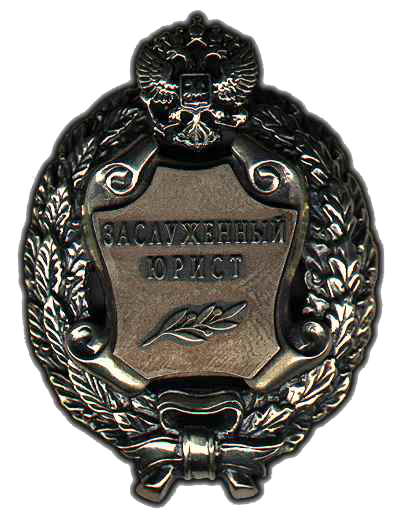
- Honoured Lawyer of Russia badge
- Type: State Decoration
- Awarded for: professional achievements
- Presented by: Russian FederationRussian Federation
- Eligibility: Citizens of the Russian Federation
- Status: Active
- Established: December 30, 1995
- First award: 1996

Honored Lawyer of the Russian Federation (Russian: Заслуженный юрист Российской Федерации) is an Honorary title in Russia assigned to highly skilled lawyers for personal services:

- in the formation of constitutional state and improving the national Russian laws in order to create equal legal conditions for the comprehensive development of individuals and organizations;
- to protect the rights, freedoms and lawful interests of Russian citizens and foreign nationals in the territory of the Russian Federation;
- to strengthen the rule of law and constitutional order of the Russian Federation;
- in the development of jurisprudence on the basis of national law schools, aimed at achieving general social progress;
- to improve the legal culture in society and in combating the effects of legal nihilism, expressed in ignorance, neglect or deliberate denial of the laws and regulations governing all aspects of life of citizens;
- in the training of qualified legal personnel.

== Criteria ==
The honorary title "Merited Lawyer of the Russian Federation" is assigned not less than 20 years since the beginning of legal practice and legal science classes in Russian organizations, and in the presence of a reward to the person represented by rewards (incentives) of the federal bodies of state authorities or public authorities of the Russian Federation.

== See also ==
- Awards and decorations of the Russian Federation
