= Elections in Russia =

Elections in Russia are held at the federal, regional, and local levels. At the federal level, voters elect a president as head of state and choose members of the State Duma, the lower house of the Federal Assembly. The Federation Council, the upper house, is not directly elected but is composed of representatives appointed by the executive and legislative bodies of each federal subject.

Russia's electoral system formally provides for universal suffrage, multiparty competition, and periodic elections at all levels of government. However, since the early 2000s, independent observers, international monitoring organizations, and comparative democracy researchers have consistently documented the progressive erosion of competitive elections. Political opposition is suppressed through legal restrictions on candidacy, the harassment and imprisonment of opposition figures, and extensive state control over mass media. Electoral fraud has been documented in numerous elections. Political scientists classify Russia's political system as a form of competitive authoritarianism or a hybrid regime, combining formal democratic institutions with authoritarian practice.

The Economist Intelligence Unit classified Russia as an authoritarian regime in its 2024 Democracy Index, and Freedom House rated it as Not Free in its 2025 Freedom in the World report, citing the absence of genuine electoral competition, pervasive state repression, and systematic fraud.

== Federal structure and electoral framework ==
=== The Federal Assembly ===
The Federal Assembly (Federalnoye Sobraniye) is bicameral, consisting of the State Duma (lower house) and the Federation Council (upper house). The State Duma has 450 members elected for five-year terms through a mixed-member majoritarian representation system. Half of the seats (225) are filled by proportional representation from party lists, with a 5 percent electoral threshold. The remaining 225 seats are contested in single-member constituencies through a first-past-the-post system.

The Federation Council is not directly elected. Each of the 89 federal subjects of Russia (including territories annexed in 2014 and 2022, which are not recognised by the international community) sends two senators to the Council: one representing the regional legislative body and one representing the regional executive, for a total of 178 senators from regional bodies. In addition, the President may appoint up to 30 additional senators as representatives of the Russian Federation, of whom up to seven may serve for life. Former presidents may also serve as life senators. The current structure of the Federation Council was established by federal law in August 2000, replacing the earlier practice under which regional governors and legislative heads sat in the Council ex officio.

=== Presidential elections ===
The President of Russia is elected in a two-round system for a six-year term, with a constitutional limit of two terms. The term was extended from four to six years by constitutional amendment in December 2008, taking effect from the 2012 election. Under the 1993 Constitution, the same person could not hold the presidency for more than two consecutive terms. The 2020 constitutional amendments modified this provision by "zeroing" all presidential terms served before the amendments entered into force, thereby allowing Vladimir Putin and former President Dmitry Medvedev to each seek up to two further terms regardless of their prior service. Under the amended constitution, presidential candidates must be at least 35 years old, have been permanently resident in Russia for at least 25 years (raised from 10 years), and must never have held foreign citizenship or a foreign residence permit.

If no candidate wins an absolute majority of votes cast in the first round, a run-off is held between the two leading candidates. Of the eight presidential elections held since 1991, only the 1996 election required a second round.

== Electoral administration ==
=== Central Election Commission ===
Federal elections are administered by the Central Election Commission (CEC; Russian: Tsentrizbirkom), established in September 1993. The CEC consists of 15 members: five appointed by the President, five by the State Duma, and five by the Federation Council. Members serve five-year terms and elect among themselves the CEC's Chair, Deputy Chair, and Secretary. The CEC is responsible for organising and overseeing federal elections, accrediting domestic and international observers, certifying election results, and maintaining voter registers.

Ella Pamfilova has served as CEC Chair since 2016. Critics and independent observers, including the Russian election monitoring organisation Golos, have documented the CEC's role in excluding opposition candidates from elections on procedural grounds and failing to investigate credible fraud allegations.

=== Regional and local election commissions ===
Regional election commissions (Election Commissions of the Subjects of the Russian Federation) serve as the supreme bodies for election administration within each federal subject. Each regional commission has between 10 and 14 members: half are appointed by the regional legislature and half by the governor. The CEC must have at least one of its nominees included among the governor's appointees. In practice, since United Russia dominates most regional legislatures and gubernatorial offices, regional commissions are frequently aligned with the ruling party.

== Latest elections ==
=== 2024 Russian presidential election ===
Presidential elections were held over three days, 15 to 17 March 2024. It was the eighth presidential election in post-Soviet Russia. Vladimir Putin was declared the winner with 87.28 percent of the vote, the highest share recorded in any post-Soviet Russian presidential election, and was inaugurated for a fifth term on 7 May 2024. The official turnout figure was 77.49 percent, also described by the CEC as the highest in modern Russian history.

The other candidates on the ballot were Nikolay Kharitonov of the Communist Party of the Russian Federation (4.31 percent), Vladislav Davankov of New People, and Leonid Slutsky of the Liberal Democratic Party of Russia. All credible opposition candidates were excluded. Alexei Navalny, who had been the most prominent opposition leader, died in a Siberian penal colony in February 2024, weeks before the election, under circumstances widely attributed to Kremlin action. Boris Nadezhdin, the only explicitly anti-war candidate backed by a registered party, was disqualified by the CEC on the grounds of alleged irregularities in signature collections.

The elections were also conducted in the Russian-occupied territories of Ukraine, drawing condemnation from Ukraine, the United States, the European Union, and 56 other countries, who declared the results in those territories invalid. The UN deputy secretary-general Rosemary DiCarlo stated that conducting elections in another state's territory without consent was "in manifest disregard for the principles of sovereignty and territorial integrity."

Statistical analyses by media outlet Meduza, based on scatter plots of turnout against Putin's vote share, found patterns consistent with large-scale falsification. Meduza concluded that the 2024 election was "almost certainly the most fraudulent" in modern Russian history, with the proportion of polling stations showing statistical indicators of fraud having grown significantly compared to 2018.

European Council President Charles Michel congratulated Putin on his victory while voting was still under way, noting that there was "no opposition, no freedom, no choice."

=== 2021 Russian legislative election ===
State Duma elections were held in September 2021. The government of Prime Minister Mikhail Mishustin prevented OSCE observers from taking part, citing COVID-19 restrictions, while critics argued the restrictions were designed to hinder independent monitoring.

Party	Party-list			Constituency			Total seats	+/–
Party	Votes	%	Seats	Votes	%	Seats	Total seats	+/–
United Russia	28,064,200	50.88	126	25,201,048	47.46	198	324	–19
Communist Party	10,660,669	19.33	48	8,984,506	16.92	9	57	+15
Liberal Democratic Party	4,252,252	7.71	19	3,234,113	6.09	2	21	–18
A Just Russia — For Truth	4,201,744	7.62	19	4,882,518	9.19	8	27	+4
New People	2,997,744	5.43	13	2,684,082	5.05	0	13	New
Russian Party of Pensioners for Social Justice	1,381,915	2.51	0	1,969,986	3.71	0	0	0
Yabloko	753,268	1.37	0	1,091,837	2.06	0	0	0
Communists of Russia	715,621	1.30	0	1,639,774	3.09	0	0	0
Russian Ecological Party "The Greens"	512,418	0.93	0	541,289	1.02	0	0	0
Rodina	450,449	0.82	0	829,303	1.56	1	1	0
Russian Party of Freedom and Justice	431,530	0.78	0	372,867	0.70	0	0	New
Green Alternative	357,870	0.65	0	120,137	0.23	0	0	New
Party of Growth	291,465	0.53	0	515,020	0.97	1	1	+1
Civic Platform	86,964	0.16	0	386,663	0.73	1	1	0
Independents				646,950	1.22	5	5	+4
Total	55,158,109	100.00	225	53,100,093	100.00	225	450	0
Valid votes	55,158,109	97.92		53,100,093	96.52			
Invalid/blank votes	1,171,581	2.08		1,913,578	3.48			
Total votes	56,329,690	100.00		55,013,671	100.00			
Registered voters/turnout	109,204,662	51.58		108,231,085	50.83			

== Previous federal elections ==
=== 2016 Russian legislative election ===
In 2015, the OSCE called on the Russian government to respect the work of independent election observers, following incidents in which citizen observers were beaten or harassed during regional elections.

Party	Party-list			Constituency			Total seats	+/–
Party	Votes	%	Seats	Votes	%	Seats	Total seats	+/–
United Russia	28,527,828	55.23	140	25,162,770	50.12	203	343	+105
Communist Party	7,019,752	13.59	35	6,492,145	12.93	7	42	−50
Liberal Democratic Party	6,917,063	13.39	34	5,064,794	10.09	5	39	−17
A Just Russia	3,275,053	6.34	16	5,017,645	10.00	7	23	−41
Communists of Russia	1,192,595	2.31	0	1,847,824	3.68	0	0	New
Yabloko	1,051,335	2.04	0	1,323,793	2.64	0	0	0
Russian Party of Pensioners for Justice	910,848	1.76	0				0	New
Rodina	792,226	1.53	0	1,241,642	2.47	1	1	New
Party of Growth	679,030	1.31	0	1,171,259	2.33	0	0	0
The Greens	399,429	0.77	0	770,076	1.53	0	0	New
People's Freedom Party	384,675	0.74	0	530,862	1.06	0	0	New
Patriots of Russia	310,015	0.60	0	704,197	1.40	0	0	0
Civic Platform	115,433	0.22	0	364,100	0.73	1	1	New
Civilian Power	73,971	0.14	0	79,922	0.16	0	0	New
Independents				429,051	0.85	1	1	+1
Total	51,649,253	100.00	225	50,200,080	100.00	225	450	0
Valid votes	51,649,253	98.13		50,200,080	96.60			
Invalid/blank votes	982,596	1.87		1,767,725	3.40			
Total votes	52,631,849	100.00		51,967,805	100.00			
Registered voters/turnout	110,061,200	47.82		109,636,794	47.40			

=== 2011 Russian legislative election ===
The 2011 State Duma elections were widely alleged to have been manipulated in favour of United Russia, with numerous journalists and opposition representatives reporting fraud. A study by Enikolopov et al. using a field experiment at polling stations found that the presence of independent observers correlated with an approximately 11 percentage point reduction in United Russia's vote share at those stations, suggesting systematic ballot inflation in unobserved precincts. Large protests against election fraud followed the announcement of results in December 2011.

Party	Votes	%	Seats	+/–
United Russia	32,379,135	50.10	238	–77
Communist Party	12,599,507	19.50	92	+35
A Just Russia	8,695,522	13.46	64	+26
Liberal Democratic Party	7,664,570	11.86	56	+16
Yabloko	2,252,403	3.49	0	0
Patriots of Russia	639,119	0.99	0	0
Right Cause	392,806	0.61	0	0
Total	64,623,062	100.00	450	0
Valid votes	64,623,062	98.43		
Invalid/blank votes	1,033,464	1.57		
Total votes	65,656,526	100.00		
Registered voters/turnout	109,237,780	60.10		

=== 2007 Russian legislative election ===
European institutional observers who monitored the December 2007 legislative elections concluded that they did not meet OSCE standards. Göran Lennmarker, president of the Parliamentary Assembly of the OSCE, stated that the elections "failed to meet many of the commitments and standards that we have. It was not a fair election." Luc Van den Brande, heading a Council of Europe delegation, cited the "overwhelming influence of the president's office and the president on the campaign" and the "abuse of administrative resources", and concluded that the elections could not be described as fair.

The OSCE was also prevented from sending observers to monitor the elections. In February 2008, the Office for Democratic Institutions and Human Rights (ODIHR) announced it would not send a mission to the March 2008 presidential election, citing severe restrictions imposed on its operations by the Russian government.

=== 2003 Russian legislative election ===
Party	Party-list			Constituency			Total seats	+/–
Party	Votes	%	Seats	Votes	%	Seats	Total seats	+/–
United Russia	22,776,294	38.16	120	14,123,625	23.95	103	223	New
Communist Party	7,647,820	12.81	40	6,577,598	11.15	12	52	−61
Liberal Democratic Party	6,944,322	11.64	36	1,860,905	3.16	0	36	+19
National Patriotic Union "Rodina"	5,470,429	9.17	29	1,719,147	2.92	8	37	New
Yabloko	2,610,087	4.37	0	1,580,629	2.68	4	4	−16
Union of Right Forces	2,408,535	4.04	0	1,764,290	2.99	3	3	−26
Agrarian Party	2,205,850	3.70	0	1,104,974	1.87	2	2	New
Russian Pensioners' Party–Party of Social Justice	1,874,973	3.14	0	342,891	0.58	0	0	−1
Party of Russia's Rebirth–Russian Party of Life	1,140,413	1.91	0	1,584,904	2.69	3	3	New
People's Party	714,705	1.20	0	2,677,889	4.54	17	17	New
Conceptual Party "Unity"	710,721	1.19	0	9,334	0.02	0	0	New
New Course — Automobile Russia	509,302	0.85	0	222,090	0.38	1	1	New
For a Holy Russia	298,826	0.50	0	59,986	0.10	0	0	New
Russian Ecological Party "The Greens"	253,985	0.43	0	69,585	0.12	0	0	0
Development of Enterprise	212,827	0.36	0	237,527	0.40	1	1	New
Great Russia – Eurasian Union	170,796	0.29	0	464,602	0.79	1	1	New
Genuine Patriots of Russia	149,151	0.25	0	2,564	0.00	0	0	New
Party of Peace and Unity	148,954	0.25	0	10,664	0.02	0	0	0
United Russian Party Rus'	147,441	0.25	0	570,453	0.97	0	0	New
Democratic Party	136,295	0.23	0	94,810	0.16	0	0	New
Russian Constitutional Democratic Party	113,190	0.19	0				0	New
Union of People for Education and Science	107,448	0.18	0	16,111	0.03	0	0	New
People's Republican Party	80,420	0.13	0	2,995	0.01	0	0	New
Other				288,866	0.49	0	0	−156
Independents				15,843,626	26.86	67	67	−38
Against all	2,851,958	4.78	0	7,744,998	13.13	0	0	−8
Vacant seats						3	3	+2
Total	59,684,742	100.00	225	58,975,063	100.00	225	450	0
Valid votes	59,684,742	98.44		58,975,063	97.93			
Invalid/blank votes	948,435	1.56		1,247,491	2.07			
Total votes	60,633,177	100.00		60,222,554	100.00			
Registered voters/turnout	108,906,250	55.67		108,906,250	55.30			

=== 1993 Russian legislative election ===
Party	Party-list			Constituency			Total seats
Party	Votes	%	Seats	Votes	%	Seats	Total seats
Liberal Democratic Party of Russia	12,318,562	22.92	59	1,604,785	3.04	5	64
Choice of Russia	8,339,345	15.51	37	3,608,497	6.84	25	62
Communist Party of the Russian Federation	6,666,402	12.40	32	1,848,888	3.50	10	42
Women of Russia	4,369,918	8.13	22	309,378	0.59	2	24
Agrarian Party of Russia	4,292,518	7.99	22	2,879,410	5.46	16	38
Yavlinsky–Boldyrev–Lukin	4,223,219	7.86	20	1,854,447	3.52	7	27
Party of Russian Unity and Accord	3,620,035	6.73	19	1,433,158	2.72	3	22
Democratic Party of Russia	2,969,533	5.52	14	1,142,830	2.17	1	15
Russian Democratic Reform Movement	2,191,505	4.08	0	1,038,068	1.97	4	4
Civic Union	1,038,193	1.93	0	1,591,476	3.02	7	7
Future of Russia–New Names	672,283	1.25	0	411,426	0.78	1	1
Constructive-Ecological Movement "Kedr"	406,789	0.76	0	301,266	0.57	0	0
Dignity and Charity	375,431	0.70	0	445,168	0.84	3	3
Independents				26,171,737	49.61	135	135
Against all	2,267,963	4.22	–	8,117,106	15.39	–	–
Vacant						6	6
Total	53,751,696	100.00	225	52,757,640	100.00	225	450
Valid votes	53,751,696	93.19					
Invalid/blank votes	3,928,002	6.81					
Total votes	57,679,698	100.00					
Registered voters/turnout	106,170,835	54.33		106,170,835	–		

== Presidential elections: historical overview ==
Since 1991, Russia has held eight presidential elections. Boris Yeltsin won the first in 1991 and was re-elected in 1996, in the only election to proceed to a second round. Vladimir Putin won in 2000, 2004, 2012, 2018, and 2024. Dmitry Medvedev won in 2008 during the period when Putin served as prime minister. In every presidential election, the Communist Party candidate has finished second: Nikolai Ryzhkov in 1991, Gennady Zyuganov in 1996, 2000, and 2008, Nikolay Kharitonov in 2004 and 2024, and Pavel Grudinin in 2018. The only election in which a third candidate exceeded 10 percent in the first round was 1996, when Alexander Lebed received approximately 15 percent.

The duration of the presidential term was four years from 1991 until the 2008 constitutional amendment, which extended terms to six years beginning with the 2012 election. The next presidential election is scheduled for 2030.

== Parliamentary elections: historical overview ==
Parliamentary elections have been held since 1993. The Communist Party of the Russian Federation was the largest party in the 1995 election (approximately 35 percent of the party-list vote) and the 1999 election (approximately 24 percent). United Russia, formed from a merger of Unity and Fatherland – All Russia, emerged as the dominant party from 2003 onwards, obtaining 38 percent in that year's elections and expanding its dominance in subsequent cycles. The Liberal Democratic Party of Russia (LDPR) and A Just Russia have consistently maintained a presence as Kremlin-tolerated parties, while genuinely independent and liberal parties such as Yabloko and the Union of Right Forces were effectively marginalised from the Duma after 2003.

== The electoral system in detail ==
=== State Duma elections ===
Elections for the State Duma are held every five years. The 450 seats are allocated as follows: 225 seats are distributed among parties that clear a 5 percent threshold in the proportional representation vote, and 225 seats are filled by plurality winners in single-member constituencies. Parties fielding lists must deposit 15 million roubles with the CEC or collect at least 200,000 signatures from registered voters. Any Russian citizen aged 21 or over is eligible to stand as a candidate for the State Duma.

=== Candidate eligibility restrictions ===
A range of legal provisions restrict who may stand for election at any level. Russian citizens holding a second citizenship or a foreign residence permit are barred from candidacy for the presidency and, following the 2020 constitutional amendments, from many other offices. People convicted of any of approximately 400 criminal or administrative offences are barred from standing. A 2022 law excluded those designated as "foreign agents" from serving on electoral commissions, participating in campaigns, or donating to parties. A further May 2024 law barred those designated as foreign agents from running for any public office. Independent election monitoring group Golos estimated in 2021 that these cumulative restrictions had effectively disenfranchised approximately one tenth of all Russian adults from the right to stand for election.

== Regional elections ==
Regional elections in Russia are held annually, with most scheduled on a Single Voting Day (Russian: Единый день голосования, romanized: Yedinyy den' golosovaniya), typically the second Sunday of September. This consolidated election date was formally established by federal law in 2012 and is designated each year by presidential decree. Regional elections encompass both gubernatorial and regional parliamentary races. In exceptional circumstances, such as early resignations, dissolutions, or the creation of new administrative units, elections may be held outside the Single Voting Day framework under Russian electoral law.

=== Governors ===
Gubernatorial elections are held annually, generally on the second Sunday of September, by presidential call. Campaigning is permitted to begin 28 days before polling day. Gubernatorial candidates must pass a "municipal filter," requiring them to obtain the signatures of a designated percentage of local councillors across a minimum number of municipalities in the region. This filter has been used as an effective tool to prevent opposition candidates from reaching the ballot, since local councils are overwhelmingly controlled by United Russia.

In September 2024, gubernatorial elections were held in 21 regions. Government-aligned candidates won all races, and United Russia candidates won 545 of 659 open regional legislative seats across the 11 regions that also held regional parliament elections. Independent observers documented ballot stuffing, intimidation, the absence of credible opposition, and anomalous electronic voting results.

=== Regional parliaments ===
Each federal subject has its own regional legislative body, elected according to rules set partly by federal law and partly by the subject's own legislation. United Russia dominates the overwhelming majority of regional legislative chambers, which in turn shapes the composition of regional election commissions and the selection of Federation Council representatives.

== Local self-government elections ==
Russian local self-government operates under two principal systems: mayor-council government, in which voters cast separate ballots for the mayor and the city council, and council-manager government, in which an appointed city manager is accountable to the City Duma.

=== Local mayoral elections ===
The proportion of Russian cities in which mayors are elected directly by voters has declined sharply. In 2006, approximately 65 percent of all Russian cities and municipalities elected their mayors through direct popular vote. By 2018, this figure had fallen to around 12 percent, as regional and federal authorities replaced direct elections with council-appointed managers. As of 2023, only six of Russia's major cities held direct mayoral elections. Where direct mayoral elections do occur, governors retain the authority to cancel or override them. Research has found that mayoral candidates running against United Russia had their candidacies cancelled at higher rates than those aligned with the ruling party.

=== Local legislative elections ===
Municipal councils are elected in most Russian jurisdictions, though their autonomy is limited. The 2020 constitutional amendments formally integrated local government into the hierarchical structure of state power, further reducing the practical independence of municipal bodies. Municipal budgets are heavily dependent on transfers from regional and federal authorities, limiting municipalities' political and financial autonomy.

== Evolution of electoral law ==
The development of Russia's electoral law since 1993 reflects successive rounds of centralisation and restrictions on competition.

- 1993 (Constitution): Elections are established as direct, subject to universal suffrage, and conducted by secret ballot (Article 97).
- 1995: Parties seeking parliamentary representation are required to gather at least 200,000 signatures and to register their candidacy no later than six months before polling day.
- 1998: The Constitutional Court upholds the constitutionality of the 5 percent threshold for party-list seats (Ruling 26-P).
- 2002: Federal Law No. 175 establishes a parallel voting electoral system for the State Duma, with 50 percent of seats elected by single-member constituencies and 50 percent by proportional party lists.
- 2003: The mixed system is replaced by a fully proportional representation system, with a raised threshold of 7 percent.
- 2008: Constitutional amendments extend the presidential term from four to six years and the State Duma term from four to five years, taking effect from the 2012 and 2011 elections respectively.
- 2012: The 7 percent threshold is reduced back to 5 percent. A new law signed by President Medvedev exempts parties from the requirement to collect signatures for parliamentary elections. The Single Voting Day is formalised.
- 2013: Putin orders a return to a parallel voting system, reverting to the framework of Federal Law No. 175.
- 2020: The "All-Russian vote" of 1 July approves a wide-ranging package of constitutional amendments, including the "zeroing" of Putin's presidential terms, raising the minimum residency requirement for presidential candidates to 25 years, constitutionally banning same-sex marriage, and integrating local government into the state power hierarchy. The vote passes with a reported 77.92 percent in favour, though the opposition disputed the conduct and legitimacy of the process.
- 2022: A law bars those designated as "foreign agents" from participating in elections in any capacity, including as candidates, campaign participants, or donors.
- 2023: Legislation is enacted permitting elections to be held in territories under martial law, including Russian-occupied areas of Ukraine.
- 2024 (May): People designated as "foreign agents" are further prohibited from standing for any public office.

== Political parties and the party system ==
United Russia has been the dominant party in the State Duma since the 2003 election, consistently securing a constitutional majority. The party is not formally led by Putin but is closely identified with his administration and has functioned as the principal instrument of Kremlin control over the legislature. The Communist Party of the Russian Federation, the LDPR, and A Just Russia (later re-formed as A Just Russia — For Truth) have been described by scholars as "systemic opposition" parties: they hold parliamentary seats and occasionally criticise government policies on matters of detail but do not challenge the fundamentals of Putin's rule and coordinate with the Kremlin.

Non-system opposition parties outside this managed system face severe obstacles. Nomination rules are prohibitively restrictive; registered parties may be arbitrarily denied the right to participate in specific elections; candidate harassment is common; and parties may be deregistered on technical grounds; resulting in a political bias. The legal designations of "foreign agent," "undesirable organisation," and "extremist organisation" have been used to criminalise opposition political activity.

== International election observation ==
Russia's relationship with international election observation has deteriorated progressively since 2000. Observers from the OSCE's Office for Democratic Institutions and Human Rights (ODIHR) and the Parliamentary Assembly of the Council of Europe (PACE) were present during most elections in the 1990s and early 2000s but faced increasing restrictions from the mid-2000s onward.

The Russian government prevented OSCE observers from monitoring the December 2007 legislative elections by imposing severe restrictions on the size and mandate of any proposed mission, leading ODIHR to cancel its mission. Similar restrictions were imposed ahead of the 2021 State Duma elections, when COVID-19 regulations were used to justify severely limiting observer access and capacity, again resulting in no OSCE mission. In 2024, most established international observer organisations did not send election monitoring missions, describing the conditions as incompatible with credible observation.

Domestic election monitoring by the independent non-governmental organisation Golos has been systematically impeded by authorities. Golos was listed as a "foreign agent" under the 2012 foreign agents law and has faced continuous legal pressure, but has continued to document electoral violations.

== Criticism and scholarly assessments ==
=== Democratic assessments ===
Russia is classified as an authoritarian regime by the Economist Intelligence Unit's Democracy Index and as Not Free by Freedom House. The V-Dem Institute classifies Russia as an "electoral autocracy" and has noted a sustained trend of autocratisation beginning around 2012 and accelerating from 2020. Russia was ranked among the least electorally democratic countries in Asia in V-Dem's 2023 dataset, with an electoral democracy index score of 0.209 out of 1.

Political scientists have characterised Russia's political system using the concept of "competitive authoritarianism," in which formal democratic institutions exist alongside systematic manipulation that renders genuine electoral competition impossible. Others have described it as a system of "dominant-party authoritarianism" or a "managed democracy."

=== Electoral fraud ===
Systematic electoral fraud in Russia has been documented through multiple methodological approaches. The field experiment by Enikolopov et al. (2013) found that United Russia's vote share at monitored polling stations was approximately 11 percentage points lower than at unmonitored ones. Statistical analyses of official results, using techniques such as Benford's law and examination of distributional irregularities, have identified patterns consistent with vote-count manipulation in multiple election cycles. The anomalies observed in 2024 were described as the most extensive in post-Soviet history, with analyses finding that the proportion of polling stations showing statistical indicators of fraud had grown significantly compared to prior elections.

=== Presidential influence over elections ===
Since the dissolution of the Soviet Union, successive administrations have shaped Russia's party system in ways that favour the incumbent. Funding, staffing decisions, and administrative resources of the executive branch have been directed toward parties aligned with the presidency, while opposition parties have faced administrative and legal obstacles. Studies have found that gubernatorial candidates opposing United Russia had their campaigns cancelled by authorities at disproportionately high rates compared to pro-government candidates.

=== Civil liberties and opposition suppression ===
Freedom House's 2025 Freedom in the World report noted that Russia's political system does not permit genuine electoral competition. The report documented the use of fabricated criminal charges to remove opponents from politics; the designation of individuals and organisations as foreign agents or extremists to criminalise opposition activity; comprehensive state control over broadcast and online media; and the use of legal provisions banning "discrediting" the armed forces to prosecute anti-war expression, with thousands of administrative and criminal cases opened since February 2022.

== See also ==
- Elections in the Soviet Union
- Freedom of assembly in Russia
- List of banned political parties#Russia
- Russian opposition
- Red Belt (Russia)
- Russian Republic
  - 1917 Russian Constituent Assembly election
- Term limits in Russia
- GAS Vybory
