= Term limits in Russia =

Russia imposes term limits on its president, preventing officeholders from being reelected after a number of terms have been reached. It historically imposed term limits on governors of its federal subjects. These limits are defined by the Constitution of Russia.

The president of Russia is limited to no more than two six-year terms. Prior to constitutional amendments in 2020, the limit applied only to consecutive terms, allowing a term-limited president to be elected again after one term out of office. The only presidents to be term-limited are Boris Yeltsin in 2000 and Vladimir Putin in 2008 and again in 2024. Since becoming president, Putin has taken several measures to circumvent his term limits. After leaving office in 2008, he retained control over the executive as prime minister, holding power over his chosen successor President Dmitry Medvedev. The 2020 amendments then exempted him from being term-limited in 2024 by excluding his previous terms, allowing him two more terms before reaching the constitutional limit. Presidents have refrained from abolishing term limits entirely because of the broad support for limits among the Russian people and the potential for political backlash.

Governors of federal subjects have not been subject to term limits since 2021. Prior to this, they were subject to a 2012 law that limited them to no more than two five-year terms consecutively but allowed them to be elected again after one term of separation from the office. From 2004 to 2012, governors were appointed by the president and could be reappointed indefinitely. Other term limits have existed historically in present-day Russia, including limits on executive office in the medieval republics of Novgorod and Pskov, as well as limits on members of the Congress of People's Deputies of the Soviet Union established by Mikhail Gorbachev in 1989.

== Presidential ==
=== 1990s ===
Article 6 of the Soviet Constitution was amended in 1990 to establish the office of President of the Soviet Union. It set terms of five years, mirroring the five-year terms used by other Soviet officials, and the president was limited to two terms. Similar limits were widely adopted by the post-Soviet states, and none of the authors challenged its inclusion during the drafting of the Russian constitution in 1993. Supporters of incumbent president Boris Yeltsin desired an opportunity for Yeltsin to stay in power and lobbied for limits on only consecutive terms, allowing further reelection of a president after spending one term away from the presidency. They considered this a higher priority than the length of a term, and they compromised on terms of only four years in length.

Having first been elected president in 1991 under the Soviet constitution, Yeltsin was reelected in 1996 under the new Russian constitution. This created a legal question as to whether his first term counted toward his term limit under the Russian constitution. In 1998, the legislature sent the issue to the Constitutional Court of Russia, which ruled that Russians knew Yeltsin was running for a second term, and as there was no grandfather clause, he was term limited.

=== Russia under Vladimir Putin ===
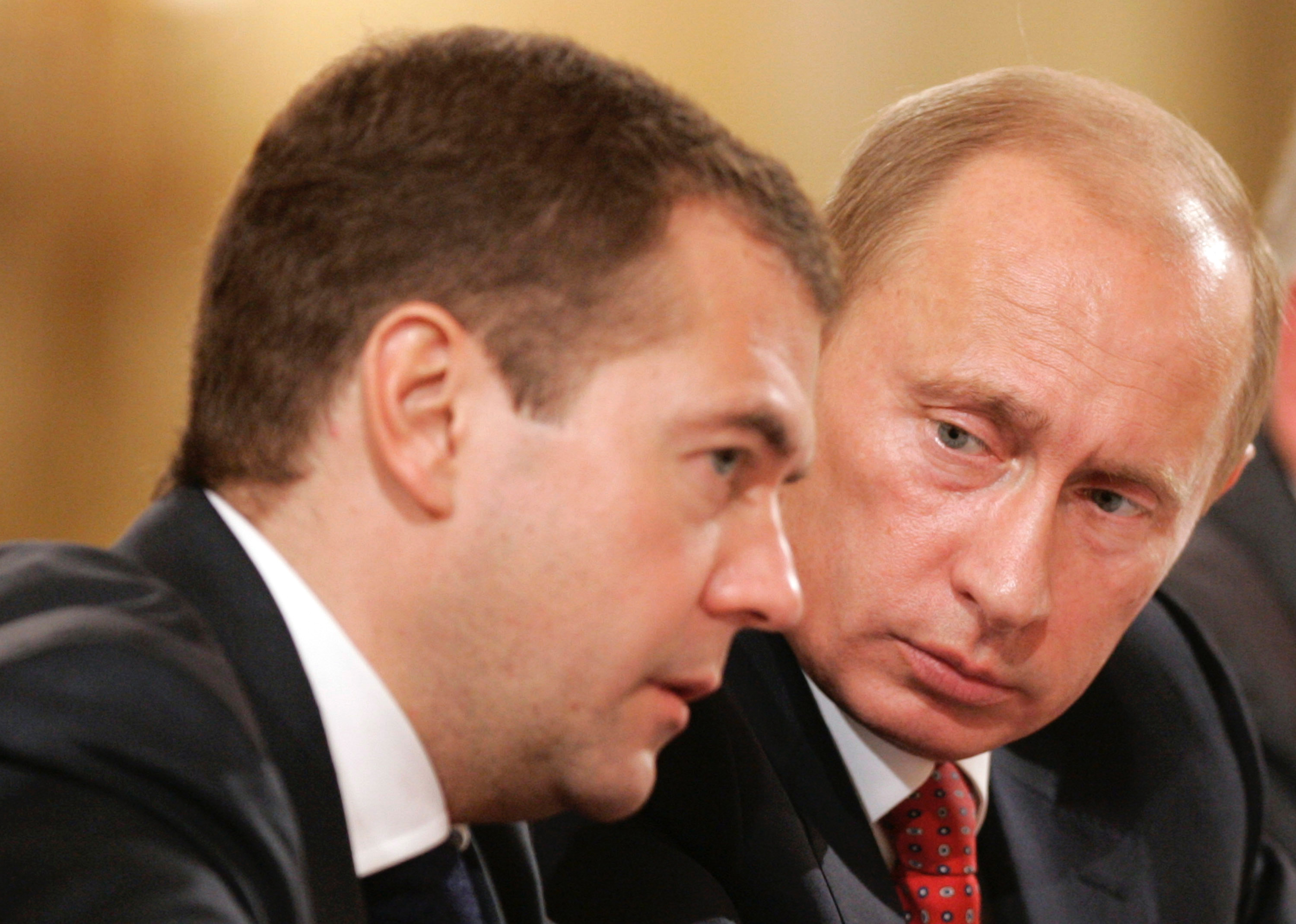
While Dmitry Medvedev (left) was president 2008–2012, Vladimir Putin (right) retained control over Russia's executive.

Yeltsin did not complete his final term, resigning from the presidency three months before it ended in 1999, making Prime Minister Vladimir Putin acting president until he was elected president in his own right in the 2000 election. He was reelected for a second term in the 2004 election. Putin reached the term limit upon the end of his second four-year term in 2008. His political future became a subject of debate in Russia, with his supporters arguing that he needed a third term to finish implementing his reforms.

To stay in power, Putin chose Dmitry Medvedev as a loyal replacement to serve as president on his behalf. In October 2007, Putin announced his intention to run in the 2007 legislative election, and in December he endorsed Medvedev to be the next president. He also used his authority as president to empower the office of prime minister, making it an effective position to retain control without the presidency. Medvedev was elected in the 2008 election, and he appointed Putin as prime minister the day after his inauguration. Observers at the time did not know whether Putin or Medvedev would be the de facto leader of Russia. Putin effectively held control over the Russian executive as prime minister, and he maintained broad control over policy. Medvedev did not exercise his power to hire or fire government officials, instead retaining those appointed by Putin. Depending on the metric used, this may be considered an effective extension of the president's tenure beyond constitutional term limits.

Before his first year as president ended, Medvedev proposed an amendment to the constitution, increasing presidential terms from four to six years. Putin had first suggested increasing the presidential term in 2007. The amendment was enacted in December 2008, to take effect beginning with the next term after the 2012 election. In September 2011, Medvedev endorsed Putin for a return to the presidency in the 2012 election. Putin returned to the presidency after the 2012 election. His return to power had a destabilizing effect as elites had fragmented between Putin and Medvedev over the previous four years, resulting in a series of protests. Putin was reelected in the 2018 election.

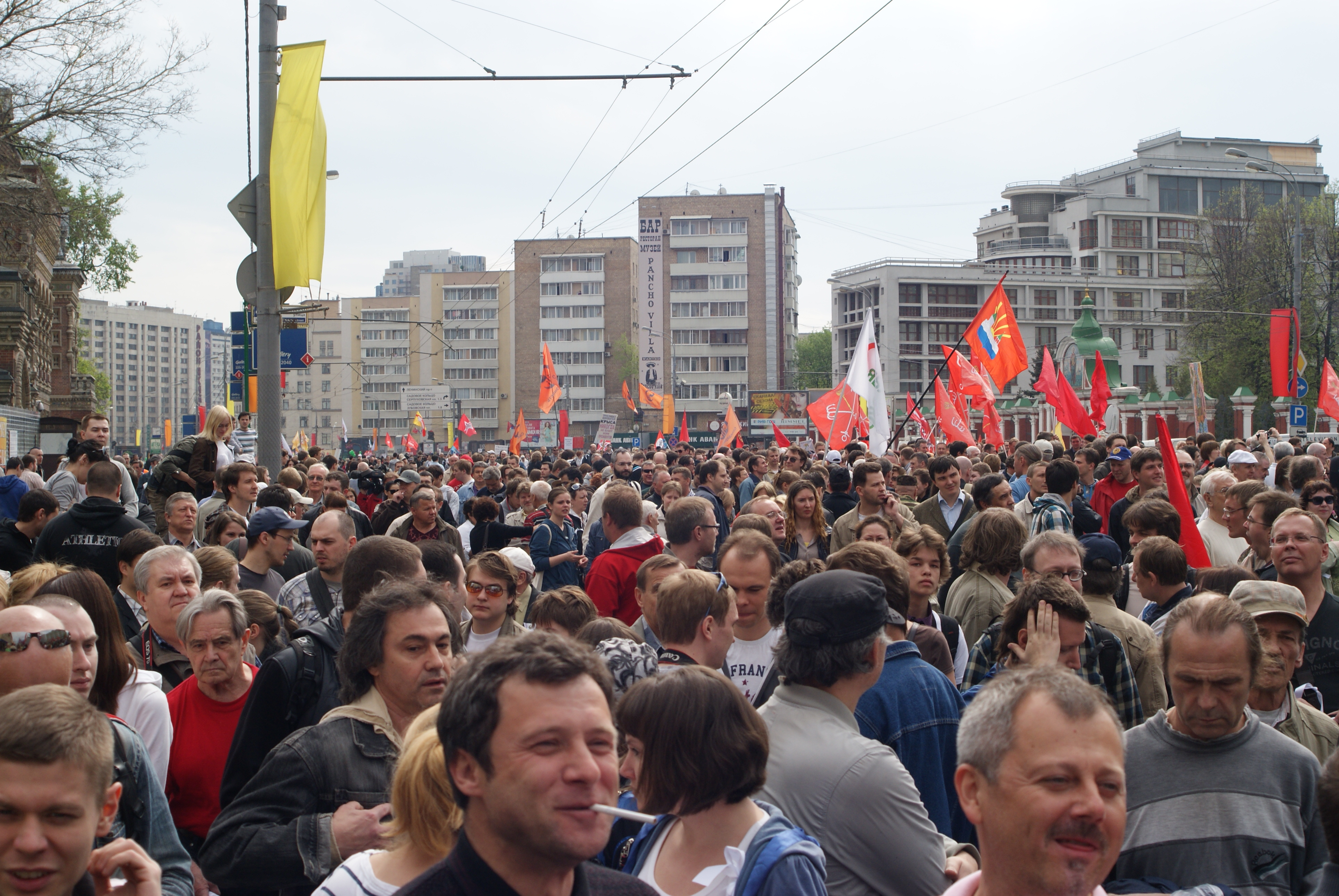
Protestors the day before Putin's return to the presidency in 2012

Putin faced a term limit for the second time after he was reelected in 2018. Having served two terms consecutively, he would have been ineligible to run in the 2024 election. Putin oversaw a wide-ranging series of constitutional amendments in 2020. As they were being discussed in the Duma, Valentina Tereshkova proposed the removal of term limits from the constitution. When the legislature consulted Putin, he rejected the idea of removing them entirely but agreed to have his own term limits reset. A referendum was held that summer, and it passed with 77.92% of the vote. The amendments removed the ability to serve additional non-consecutive terms beyond the two-term limit, restricting the president to two lifetime terms. It also included the clause that excluded previous terms from this count, effectively allowing Putin to run for reelection as if he had not served any previous terms. A referendum was not legally required to enact the amendments, but holding one gave the changes legitimacy.

As Putin was permitted two more consecutive terms without regard for his previous tenure, the 2020 constitutional amendment gave him legal authority to stay in office until 2036. Despite being more consequential than any of the other amendments, this change was not a major point in the political debate leading up to the referendum. The changes were codified in civil law a few months later.

== Governors and other regional executives ==
The federal government under Yeltsin passed a law regulating the governors of Russian subjects in 1999, limiting them to two terms. Many were then elected to their second terms in 2000, which were set to end in 2004. A large turnover of governors risked a significant change to the political landscape that Putin's federal government wished to prevent. To keep these governors in power, Putin had the government reinterpret the law in 2001 so that the term limit only began after the law's passing, negating terms prior to the 2000 election. This benefited allies of the federal government, such as Mintimer Shaimiev, the president of Tatarstan who had already filed to run for a third term despite being term-limited. Another effect was that governors could effectively disregard previous terms if the length of a term was legally changed, as this would constitute a new law with a new term limit.

Putin ordered that governors be appointed instead of popularly elected beginning in 2004. This abolished term limits, as the president could reappoint a governor any number of times. Incumbent governors were permitted to request a vote of confidence from Putin to allow their reappointment. These requests were prearranged and involved secret agreements with the federal government. The switch from elections to appointments was supported by a majority of the incumbent governors, many of whom were about to be term limited or were unpopular enough that they would have to produce fraudulent election results to stay in power. The removal of term limits meant that long-standing governors such as Yevgeny Savchenko and Aman Tuleyev were able to serve continuously for over a decade. In the years after the change, many governors joined the ruling United Russia party.

Putin typically reappointed incumbent governors when they reached the ends of their terms, while his successor Medvedev was more likely to replace governors. Medvedev argued that a governor should not serve more than three terms unless there were exceptional circumstances, though he granted fourth terms to approximately 40% of governors during his presidency. Direct election of governors was restored in 2012, as was a limit of two terms. Another law in 2015 negated terms prior to the restoration of elections, meaning that all governors were permitted two more terms regardless of how many they had previously served. Term limits for governors were then abolished in December 2021.

== Historical limits ==
The earliest term limits in Russia were established in the 13th century in the Novgorod Republic for the office of posadnik (mayor), and they lasted until the city-state was annexed by Moscow in 1478. Similar to the Italian city-states, Novgorod had a mixed government. The posadnik shared executive power with the prince, and competition for the office led to it being rotated among aristocrats, especially after the authority of the prince was greatly diminished in the 13th century. This practice ended in the mid-14th century, when the office was converted into a council with lifetime appointments. The council consisted of six executives elected for life; from among them, a chairman (stepennoy posadnik) was elected for a one-year term and later a six-month term from the early 15th century. A similar office subject to term limits developed in the Pskov Republic in the 14th century. Like Novgorod, Pskov was an oligarchy, and the veche (assembly) elected posadniki until Pskov lost its autonomy in 1510.

President Mikhail Gorbachev of the Soviet Union implemented elections and term limits for the Congress of People's Deputies in 1989. This posed a challenge to entrenched members of the Communist Party that opposed Gorbachev's perestroika reforms and transferred some of their political influence to the soviets. Members of executive committees were then limited to two terms that October.

== Political implications ==
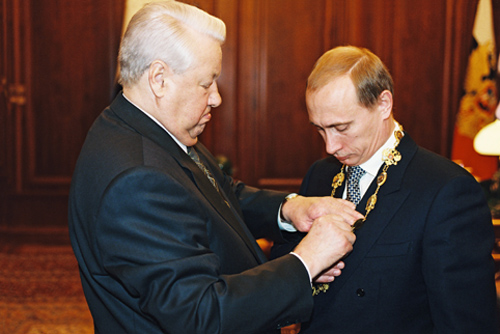
Boris Yeltsin (left) transferring the presidential emblem to Vladimir Putin (right); Yeltsin was term-limited and resigned near the end of his second term.

The manipulation of term limits has allowed Putin to stay in power at the federal level and keep allies in power in federal subjects. The use of nonconsecutive terms to stay in power always creates a political risk as the interim president could try to seize power, and this is especially a concern in Russia where the president has broad unilateral powers. Putin's use of nonconsecutive terms also posed a risk in that he exercised power through the office of the prime minister, which is subject to his party's support and its control over the legislature.

Though supporters of the term limited presidents Yeltsin and Putin have endorsed the abolition of term limits, neither president supported this position. Presidential term limits are generally popular in Russia, and abolishing them entirely could trigger backlash. Support for the protests around Putin's 2012 election strongly correlated with support for term limits. While abolishing term limits had globally been the most common way to stay in power in the 2000s and 2010s, these factors prompted Putin to instead retain power through the much rarer strategies of installing a loyal replacement and then through resetting term limits. By maintaining power while still following a literal interpretation of the law, Putin is able to create an illusion of effective term limits.

== See also ==
- Elections in Russia
- List of political term limits
