= Medvedev–Putin tandemocracy =

2008–2012 joint leadership of Russia

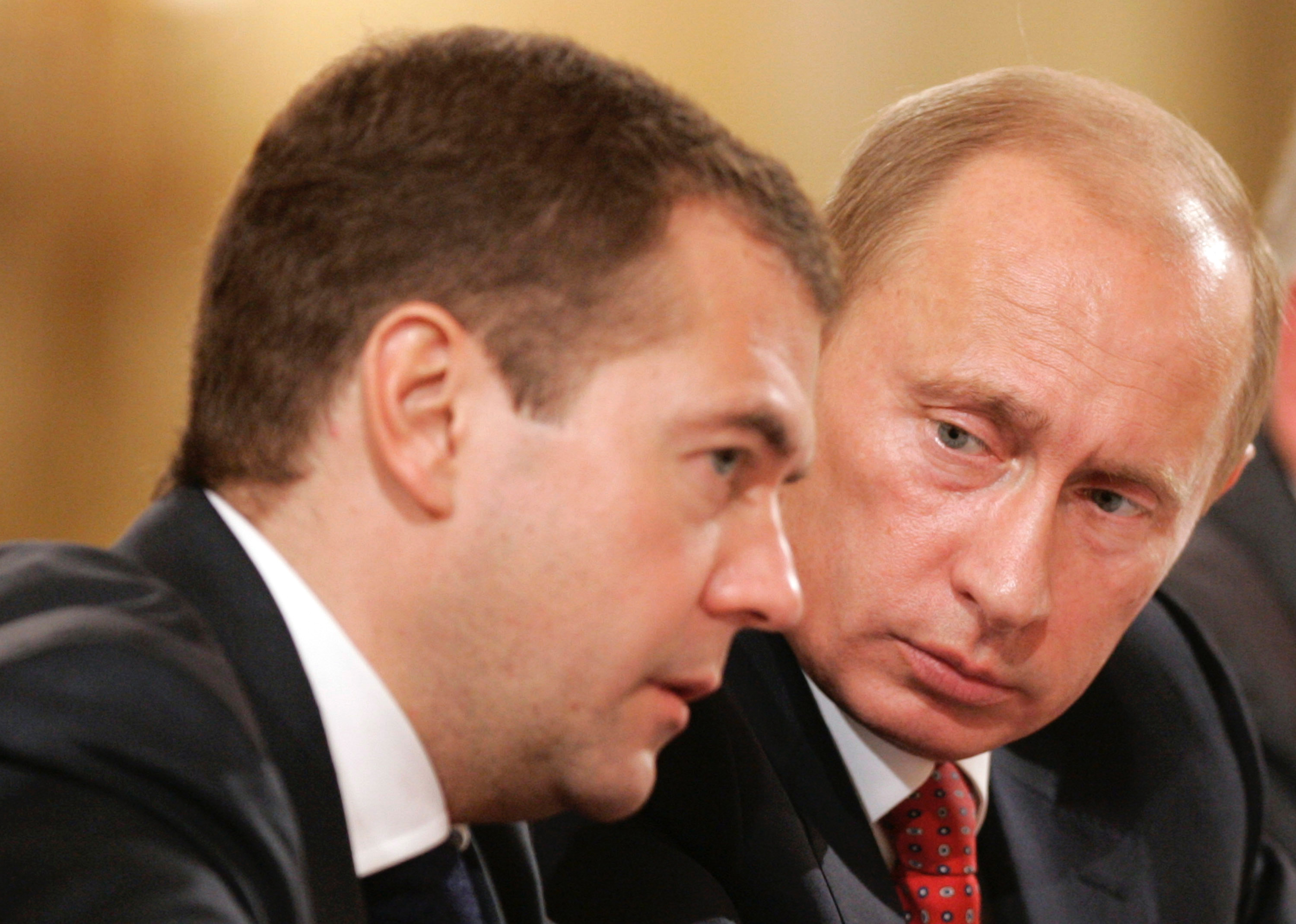
President Dmitry Medvedev and Prime Minister Vladimir Putin in 2008

The Medvedev–Putin tandemocracy (Russian: Тандем Медведев—Путин) was the joint leadership of Russia between 2008 and 2012 when Vladimir Putin, who was constitutionally barred from serving a third consecutive term as president of Russia, assumed the role of prime minister under President Dmitry Medvedev. While the office of prime minister is nominally the subservient position, opinions differ as to what extent Putin was the de facto leader during this period, with most believing either that Putin remained paramount or that he and Medvedev had similar levels of power. Putin was re-elected president in the 2012 election and Medvedev became his prime minister. The 2020 amendments allowed Putin's bid for a third consecutive term in the 2024 election. Medvedev resigned as prime minister in 2020.

The term "tandemocracy" is a political neologism, a portmanteau of "tandem" + "-o-" (interfix) + "-cracy" (rule).

During the 2008 Russian presidential election, Dmitry Medvedev was elected president (head of state) with 73% of votes. He had been nominated as a candidate by four Russian political parties and made a promise to appoint Putin for the position of prime minister during the campaign.

Prime Minister Vladimir Putin, while holding a constitutionally less significant position, continued to be ranked as a somewhat more popular politician (83% of approval vote in January 2009) than President Dmitry Medvedev (75% of approval vote in January 2009).

According to opinion polls conducted by the Levada Center, in January 2009, 11% of Russia's respondents believed it was Medvedev who had the real power in Russia, 32% believed it was Putin, 50% thought that both Medvedev and Putin had the real power, and 7% answered "did not know". In February 2008, prior to the presidential election, 23% people had believed Medvedev had the real power in the country, 20% thought Putin had the real power, 41% thought Putin and Medvedev had equal shares of power, 16% did not answer. While the number of people who thought that Medvedev was the number one had halved, Putin's approval rating had dropped to 48% from 62% for the same period.

== Opinions ==
=== Putin was in charge ===
Commentators, analysts and some politicians concurred in 2008 and early 2009 that the transfer of presidential powers that took place on 7 May 2008 was in name only and Putin continued to retain the number one position in Russia's effective power hierarchy, with Dmitry Medvedev being a figurehead or "Russia's notional president".

Within the context of the ongoing Russia–Ukraine gas dispute in early January 2009, Nikolai Petrov, an analyst with the Carnegie Moscow Center said: "What we see right now is the dominant role of Putin. We see him as a real head of state. ... This is not surprising. We are still living in Putin's Russia".

On 1 February 2009, an analytical piece in The International Herald Tribune said: "Putin is still considered Russia's paramount leader, but by taking the title of prime minister, he may have deprived himself of a fall-guy-in-waiting. That role traditionally has gone to Russia's prime ministers; Yeltsin repeatedly dismissed his during the 1998 default. So far, Putin has instead made a scapegoat of the United States, saying it was at the heart of Russia's crisis, rather than Moscow's over-reliance on the export of natural resources".

=== Medvedev and Putin shared the power ===
Some Russian commentators and analysts spoke of "Medvedev–Putin tandem", or "Medvedev–Putin tandemocracy".

Prior to the 2008 election, political scientists Gleb Pavlovsky and Stanislav Belkovsky discussed the future configuration of power. According to Mr. Pavlovsky, people would be very suited with the option of the union of Putin and Medvedev "similar to the two Consuls of Rome". Belkovsky called Medvedev "president of a dream", referring to the early 1990s when people ostensibly dreamed of the time they "would live without the stranglehold of ubiquitous ideology, and a common person would become the head of the state".

In an August 2008 interview to Der Spiegel, former Chancellor of Germany Gerhard Schröder expressed his view of a Putin-Medvedev tandem: "There are enough internal problems in Russia that need to be solved. ... President (Dmitry) Medvedev and Prime Minister Putin are addressing these problems—together, by the way, in friendship and mutual respect, not in competition with one another, as journalistic fortune-tellers often imply".

At the end of 2008, Nezavisimaya Gazeta in editorial "Tandem" expressed the view the country is led by the tandem. It's naive to guess who is a more important figure: because Medvedev and Putin are like-minded people. Both people are in tough position: Medvedev faced crisis and war, situation where it's hard to stay liberal; while Putin as head of Government is responsible for socially economical issues in the crisis, what is viewed to reduce his rating. Putin is yet the most experienced real politician in Russia with immense influence. Neither of the two people have to be afraid of the future: Medvedev learns quickly, gathering a team around himself, with Constitution being immensely pro-presidential; while nobody will push Putin from his position if he does not want to leave himself.

The newspaper pointed out this novelty in Russia's political life: the president is in no position to criticize the premier, the government, or ministers; the Duma, in turn, is in no position to criticize its leader's cabinet.
