= Taliya Habrieva =

Russian legal writer

- Талия Хабриева
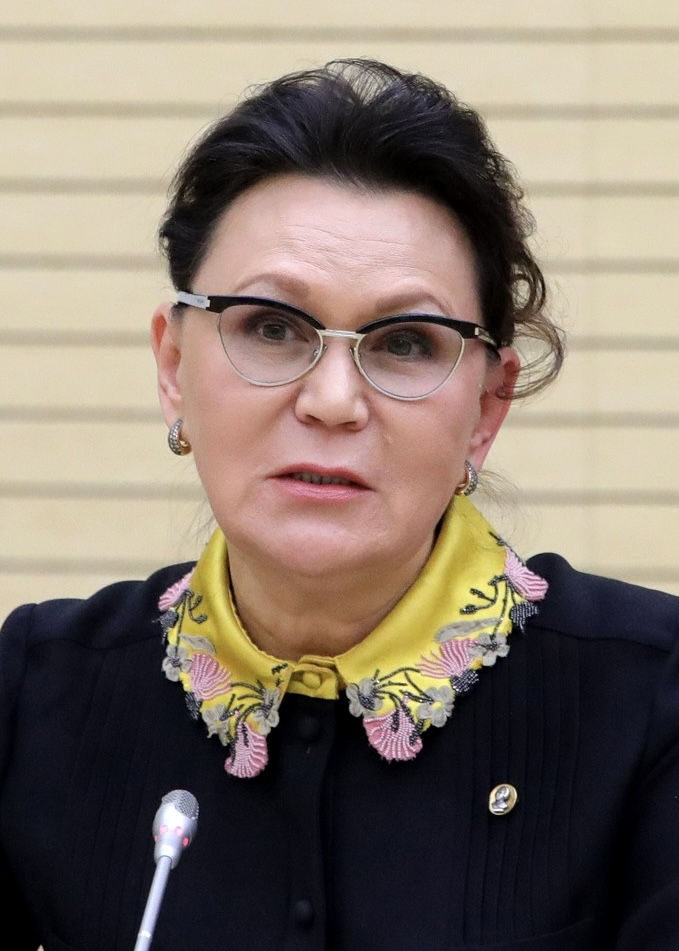
- Habrieva in 2020
- Born: Taliya Yarullovna Nasyrova; 10 June 1958 (age 68); Kazan, Tatar ASSR, Soviet Union
- Known for: 2020 amendments to the Constitution of Russia
- Spouse: Ramil Habriev
- Awards: Order "For Merit to the Fatherland" (2nd, 3rd and 4th class); Order of Alexander Nevsky; Order of Honour; Order of Friendship; Honoured Lawyer of Russia

Academic background
- Education: Kazan State University (Specialist); Institute of Legislation and Comparative Law (Candidate of Sciences); Institute of State and Law (Doctor of Sciences)
- Thesis: Interpretation of the Constitution of the Russian Federation: Theory and Practice (1997)

Academic work
- Discipline: Constitutional law
- Institutions: Kazan State University; Moscow State Institute of International Relations; Paris 1 Panthéon-Sorbonne University; Institute of State and Law
- Main interests: Comparative law, constitutional law, legal theory, legal interpretation

Taliya Yarullovna Habrieva (Russian: Талия Ярулловна Хабриева, Tatar: Талия Ярулла кызы Хәбриева; née Nasyrova (Насырова); born 10 June 1958) is a Russian scholar of constitutional law. She was instrumental in preparing the 2020 amendments to the Constitution of Russia that allowed President Vladimir Putin to remain in power after 2024.

== Career ==
In 1980 she graduated from the Law Faculty of Kazan State University. In her career as a jurist, she quickly obtained leading positions in Russian legal institutions.

From 1996 to 2002, she served as Senior Research Fellow, head of the theory of constitutional law, and deputy head of the Centre of Public Law, Institute of State and Law of the Russian Academy of Sciences.

From 1998 to 2001 Habrieva held the post of State Secretary - Deputy Minister of Federal Affairs, National and Migration Policy of the Russian Federation.

In 2000 she was awarded the academic title of Professor of Constitutional Law.

Beginning in 2001, she served as Director of the Institute of Legislation and Comparative Law.

Beginning in 2003, she served as visiting professor at the University of Paris-I Panthéon-Sorbonne (France).

Beginning in 2007, she became a member of the Presidium of the Higher Attestation Commission of the Russian Ministry of Education.

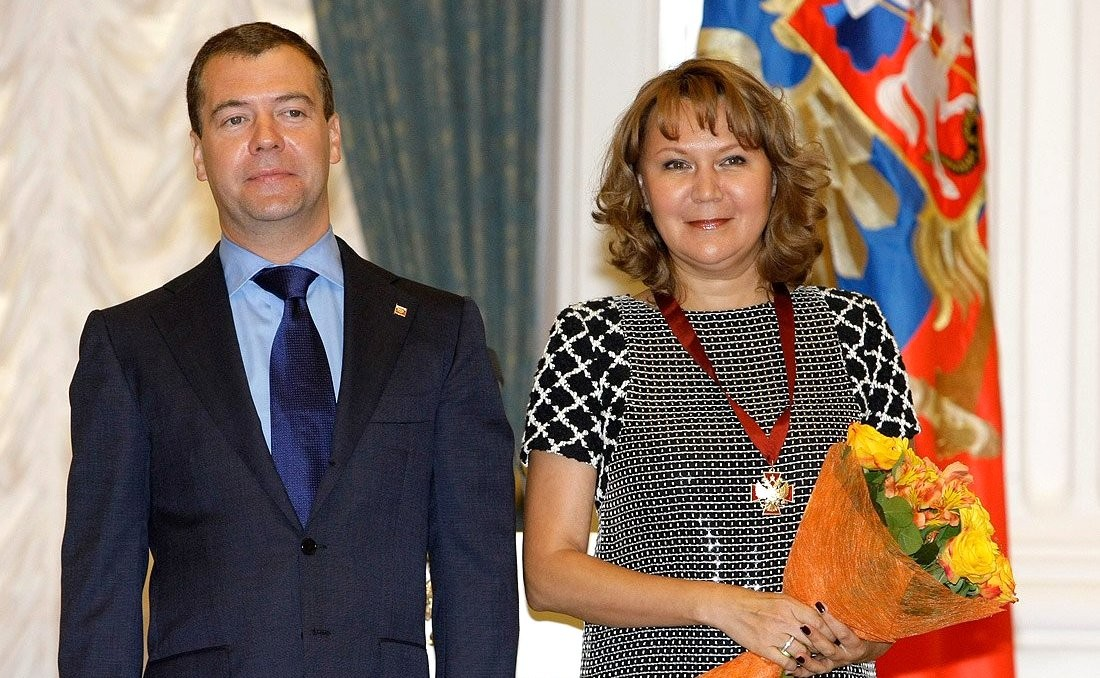
President Dmitry Medvedev awarding Habrieva with Order "For Merit to the Fatherland" (3rd class), 2010

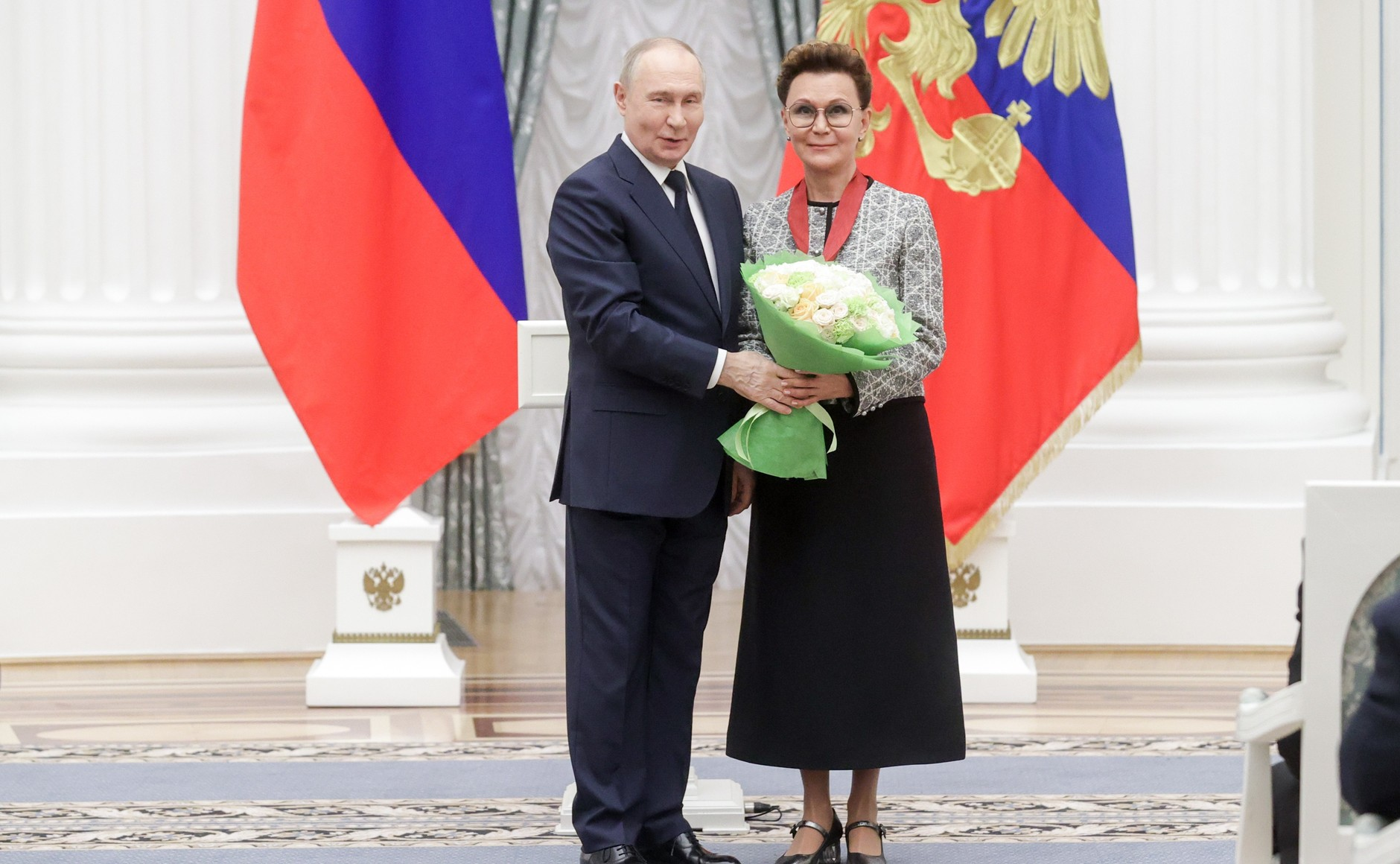
President Vladimir Putin awarding Habrieva with Order "For Merit to the Fatherland" (2nd class), 2025

Among the titles she holds or has held are Academician (since 2011) and Vice-president of the Russian Academy of Sciences, Doctor of Law, Professor, Director of the Institute of Legislation and Comparative Law under the Government of the Russian Federation.

She was also a member of the Venice Commission, a senior legal advisory body to the Council of Europe.

In January 2020, President Putin appointed her to lead the commission preparing amendments to the Russian constitution. The principal effect of these amendments, ratified in a 2020 referendum, was to greatly strengthen the powers of the presidency and to allow Putin to circumvent constitutional term limits.

As of 2022, Habrieva is the scientific director of the "Beringoff International Academy for Law", an unaccredited institution of legal education in Montreux.

== Personal life ==
According to the Russian opposition party Yabloko, who denounced Habrieva to Russian prosecutors in 2020, Habrieva is the owner of a luxury villa in Moscow and a luxury apartment in Montreux, Switzerland, that according to Yabloko could not have been acquired with her declared income as a jurist. Russian opposition media report that Habrieva's close ties to the Russian regime, including to Director of the Foreign Intelligence Service Sergey Naryshkin, have shielded her from any investigation in Russia.

Habrieva is married to Ramil Habriev, the former head of the Russian Anti-Doping Agency, who resigned in 2015 under international pressure following revelations about systematic doping in Russia.
