= E-government in Russia =

Russian e-government

E-government in Russia refers to the use of information and communication technologies, digital platforms and electronic information systems by the federal, regional and municipal authorities of the Russian Federation to administrate public affairs, deliver government services, exchange information and interact with citizens, businesses and other public institutions. Its development has formed part of broader efforts to modernize public administration, improve administrative efficiency, expand access to public services and establish an integrated digital infrastructure for government operations.

During the 2010s, Russian e-government evolved from the digitization of individual administrative procedures towards a more integrated model of digital public administration. The expansion of multifunctional centres, which provide access to multiple government services through a single point of contact, complemented online service delivery. At the same time, government institutions increasingly adopted electronic document management, interconnected databases and automated administrative systems. The national program Digital Economy of the Russian Federation, introduced in 2019, further reinforced the emphasis on digital transformation, while the development of the GosTekh platform sought to establish shared technological infrastructure for government information systems.

== History ==
On April 7, 1994, the international network center InterNIC officially registered the .ru country-code top-level domain for the Russian Federation.

The development of e-government components in Russia was initiated as early as 2002, in accordance with the "Electronic Russia" federal targeted program, which was in effect in the Russian Federation from 2002 to 2010.

The concept of e-government was approved by the Russian Government on May 6, 2008. According to this concept, the e-government system was to be developed in two stages:

- 2008 — development and approval of the necessary documentation
- 2009–2010 — practical implementation

On September 10, 2009, Resolution No. 721 was issued, titled "On Amendments to the Federal Targeted Program Electronic Russia (2002–2010)".

The revised version of the Program incorporated specific measures, objectives, and performance indicators aimed at building Russia’s e-government infrastructure and implementing the concept for establishing an e-government in the Russian Federation by 2010 (as set forth in Russian Government Directive No. 632-r of May 6, 2008).

Under the Program, the e-government infrastructure is to be built upon a unified technological platform. This involves integrating various functional elements—such as the information systems of federal executive bodies, constituent entities of the Russian Federation, and local government authorities—onto a single telecommunications infrastructure. It also encompasses public access infrastructure, including access points in public reception offices, libraries, and the Russian Post, as well as departmental and regional call centers, government websites, and regional multifunctional service centers. Beyond providing services to citizens and organizations, the e-government infrastructure is tasked with developing information and analytical systems designed to enhance the efficiency of public administration, monitor socio-economic development, and manage the execution of priority national objectives (collectively referred to as GAS Upravlenie). In essence, this initiative addresses fundamental issues concerning the improvement and administrative reform of public governance in Russia. At the same time, a number of researchers argue that Russia faces a problem of insufficient state transparency in the digital sphere, which hinders civic oversight and reduces the effectiveness of anti-corruption efforts.

The systematic digital transformation of public administration at the highest level in Russia began with a speech by Russian President, Dmitry Medvedev, titled "On the Implementation of the Strategy for the Development of the Information Society in the Russian Federation", delivered at a meeting of the State Council Presidium on July 17, 2008. Subsequently, by Presidential Decree No. 1576 of November 1, 2008, the Council under the President of the Russian Federation for the Development of the Information Society in the Russian Federation was established. It was designated as the primary coordinating body for all matters related to the informatization of the Russian state—a task that President Dmitry Medvedev viewed as a strategic priority for his presidential term. Medvedev envisioned this Council as an instrument for achieving that objective:

"Why have we created this Council? We are not satisfied with the fact that, in terms of key indicators for the development of the information society, we remain a vast distance behind most developed nations. In relevant international rankings, Russia does not even place in the top 20 or 30—it ranks 70th or 80th! And this is despite the fact that we possess a historically high level of intellectual potential. The gap between us and the leading nations is not shrinking; paradoxically, even as our economy grows and overall living standards improve, the gap is actually widening. In terms of the E-Government Development Index, we ranked 56th in 2005, and by 2007, we had reached 92nd place. This suggests that we do not have an 'e-government' at all—it is nothing more than a chimera. In the ranking of countries' readiness for a networked world, we also hold the 'distinguished' 72nd position… An important topic is the use of information technology in the social sphere…"

— Dmitry Medvedev

.

In December 2009, at a joint meeting of the State Council and the Council for the Development of the Information Society, President Dmitry Medvedev noted that, in accordance with the Strategy for the Development of the Information Society, all public services were to be transitioned to an electronic format by 2015. It was estimated that the full transition to various forms of e-government could take 5–6 years.

Subsequently, on October 20, 2010, the Government of Russia issued Directive No. 1815-r, adopting the Information Society State Program for 2011–2020[6]. This program was designed to create a comprehensive and efficient system for utilizing information technology, ensuring maximum benefit for citizens. As part of this initiative, Multifunctional Centers were established across Russia—public institutions that provide state and municipal services through a "single-window" principle, allowing an applicant to receive services by submitting a request just once.

Today, the development of "e-government" continues under the Russian Federation government, in line with the "Digital Economy" National Project, which is being implemented over the 2019–2024 period.

== Coordinating bodies ==
- Government of Russia — implements the Digital Economy national project
- Ministry of Digital Development, Communications and Mass Media of Russia — includes a Department for the Development of E-Government
- Ministry of Economic Development of Russia — tasked with the development of E-Government
- Russian Foundation for the Development of Information Technologies

== Systems ==
According to the Accounts Chamber of the Russian Federation, as of 2022, federal government authorities and their subordinate institutions were utilizing 630 federal state information systems and 512 other information systems, collectively containing 510,976 terabytes of data.

Provided below is a non-exhaustive list of digital government services and information systems currently used by the state authorities of the Russian Federation, categorized by function:

=== Interdepartmental ===
- State Automated Information System "Management" (GAS "Upravlenie")
- Unified Information Platform of the National Data Management System (FGIS "EIP NSUD")
- System for Interdepartmental Electronic Interaction (SMEV)
- Unified Digital Platform GosTekh

=== Collection and Processing of Personal Data of Russian Citizens ===
- Unified Biometric System;
- Electronic Passport of a Citizen of the Russian Federation;
- Digital Fan ID;
- Portal of State Services of the Russian Federation (Gosuslugi)
- Unified Identification and Authentication System (ESIA)
- Federal Standard Medical Information System (FT MIS)
- Unified Medical Information and Analytical System (EMIAS)
- GIS "Funeral and Burial Activities"

=== Elections, Lawmaking, and Justice ===
- GAS Vybory
- GAS Justice (GAS "Pravosudie")
- Automated System for Supporting Legislative Activity (ASOZD)
- Federal State Information System for Pre-trial Appeals (FGIS DO)
- State Automated System for Legal Statistics (GAS PS)

=== Financial and Tax Systems and Services ===
- Taxpayer’s Personal Account — an online service provided by the Federal Tax Service of Russia
- ASK NDS (Automated VAT Control System)
- GIIS Electronic Budget (State Integrated Information System "Electronic Budget")
- Unified Information System in the Sphere of Procurement
- State Information System for State and Municipal Payments (GIS GMP)
- Automated Information System for Licensing Certain Types of Activities (AIS LOD)

=== Urban Planning and Management Information Systems ===
- Information Systems for Supporting Urban Planning Activities (IS OGD)
- Federal State Information System for Territorial Planning (FGIS TP)
- GIS "ZhKKh" (State Information System for Housing and Utilities)
- ISDM-Rosleskhoz (Information System for Remote Monitoring of the Federal Forestry Agency)
- GAIS ERA-GLONASS
- AIS Road Safety
- Product Labeling and Traceability System
- FGIS "Mercury"
- EGAIS-Labeling
- EGAIS Alcohol
- EGAIS Timber
- EGAIS Grain
- Unified Register of Russian Computer Programs and Databases.

== See also ==
- OGAS
