= 2020 Russian constitutional referendum =

Vote on amendments to the Constitution of Russia

- 25 June – 1 July 2020
- Do you approve amendments to the Constitution of the Russian Federation?

Results
Choice	Votes	%
Yes	57,747,288	78.56%
No	15,761,978	21.44%
Valid votes	73,509,266	99.18%
Invalid or blank votes	604,951	0.82%
Total votes	74,114,217	100.00%
Registered voters/turnout	109,190,337	67.88%
- Results by federal subject

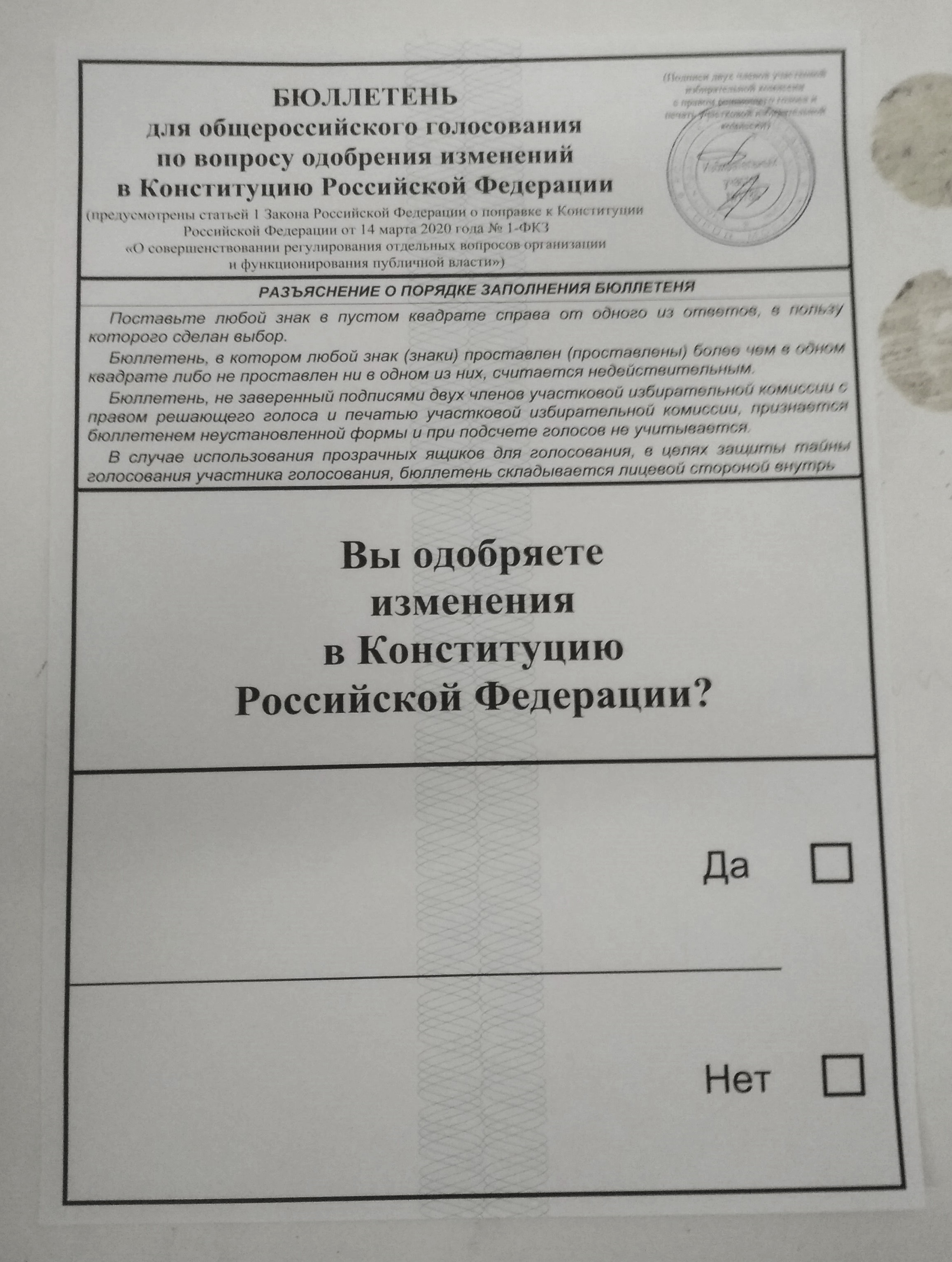
Referendum ballot

A constitutional referendum was held in Russia between 25 June and 1 July 2020. President Vladimir Putin proposed the referendum during his address to the Federal Assembly on 15 January 2020. The draft amendments to the constitution were submitted to a referendum in accordance with article 2 of the Law on Amendments to the Constitution. The referendum is legally referred to as an "All-Russian vote" (Russian: общероссийское голосование, romanized: obshcherossiyskoye golosovaniye), for it is not held in accordance with the Federal Constitutional Law on the Referendum.

The amendments include sweeping changes to the constitution, including allowing Putin to run again for two more six-year presidential terms (which would allow him to potentially stay in power until 2036) and enshrining social measures on pensions and welfare state as well as conservative ones such as constitutionally banning same-sex marriage, ensuring patriotic education in schools, and placing the constitution above international law.

Originally scheduled for 22 April 2020, the vote was postponed to a later date due to the COVID-19 pandemic in Russia. It had been noted that the initial vote date coincided with the 150th anniversary of Vladimir Lenin's birth. In-person voting at the polling stations was held from 25 June to 1 July, with 1 July being declared a day off as the actual voting date. Residents of Moscow and the Nizhny Novgorod Oblast could participate in the event remotely (electronically) from 25 to 30 June.

According to official results, 79% of valid votes supported the changes to the constitution. Later that year, Putin accepted the results and signed them into law. Many international observers criticized the results of the referendum claiming widespread reports of irregularities such as: voter coercion, multiple voting, violation of secrecy of the vote and allegations of police violence against a journalist who was present to observe. Further criticism is centered around the amendment that could extend Putin's presidency to 2036.

== Proposed amendments ==
On 19 December 2019, Vladimir Putin announced possible amendments to the Constitution during a press conference. The following month, he repeated his intention to amend the constitution when he addressed the Federal Assembly.

Among notable changes were the right of the president to remove federal justices, to remove Supreme Justices following approval by the Federation Council, a right for the lower house of the Parliament to appoint the prime minister and the "supremacy of Russian law over international law". It also extended presidential term limits, enabling Putin, if reelected, to hold presidential office until 2036. The previous version of the constitution would have required him to step down in 2024; this move has been labelled a "power grab" by some commentators. The extension to term limits allows Putin (and former President Medvedev) to run for two further six-year presidential terms, something Putin has not yet ruled out. Critics have accused him of plotting to stay in power for life, while supporters have lauded the inclusion of the amendment.

Putin ordered the creation of a working group of 75 people to work on drafting proposed amendments.

The amendments stipulate social guarantees for citizens. The amendments mention, for the first time in the constitution: marriage – defined as the union of a man and a woman, faith in God, as well as the State Council (which increases its role). The Russian nationality will be called a "state-forming nation" (Russian: государствообразующий народ). The institution of the presidency will be strengthened. The word "consecutive" will be removed from the clause which limits the term of ruling the country to "two consecutive terms". The amendments also stipulate the right of the Constitutional Court to block the implementation of decisions of international organizations on the grounds of the unconstitutionality of such decisions (the body has had this power since 2015).

=== List ===
On 20 January 2020, President Vladimir Putin submitted the draft amendments to the State Duma, expecting 14 articles to be changed in total:

- the Russian constitution will supersede international law;
- the State Duma will have the right to approve a Prime Minister's candidacy (currently it only gives consent to the appointment), and it will also be able to approve candidates for Deputy Prime Minister and Federal Minister; the President will not be able to refuse their appointment, but in some cases will be able to remove them from office;
- the eligibility term requiring competing candidates for high-profile offices (President, Ministers, judges, heads of regions) to have no foreign citizenship or permit of residence in foreign countries, or have it at the time of their work in the office or, at any time before running for the President;
- the minimal residency requirement for presidential candidates will be raised from 10 years to 25;
- the Federation Council will be able to propose to the President to dismiss Federal judges; in some cases, the Federation Council, on the proposal of the President, will have the right to remove judges of the Constitutional and Supreme courts;
- heads of law enforcement agencies must be appointed by the President in consultation with the Federation Council;
- the minimum wage cannot be lower than the subsistence minimum;
- regular indexation of pensions;
- consolidation of the status and role of the State Council (at present it is only an advisory body and is not prescribed in the Constitution);
- granting the Constitutional Court the ability to check the constitutionality of laws adopted by the Federal Assembly of the Russian Federation at the request of the President before they are signed by the President;
- removal of the term "in a row" (Russian: подряд, romanized: podryad) from the article regulating presidential term limits, discounting previous and current terms before the amendment entered into force;
- defining marriage as a relationship between one man and one woman (effectively banning Same-sex marriage);
- enshrine the status of the Russian language in the country's constitution.

== Proposed adoption without a referendum ==
The Constitution of the Russian Federation was accepted on the national vote on 12 December 1993 and consists of nine chapters. The order of revision of Chapters 1, 2 and 9 is prescribed in Article 135 of the Constitution and requires the convening of the Constitutional Assembly for the adoption of the new Constitution. The procedure for amending Chapters 3 to 8 is defined in Article 136 and requires the adoption of the law on amendments to the Constitution of the Russian Federation according to a procedure similar to (but not identical due to the requirement of ratification of the amendment by regional legislative bodies) the adoption of a federal constitutional law.

Several amendments have been made to the Constitution since its enactment. The largest were the amendments proposed in the 2008 Presidential message. Other amendments included an amendment to merge the Supreme and Supreme Arbitration Courts, as well as the amendment to appoint an additional group of Federation Council members ("representatives of the Russian Federation") by the President. The Constitution was also amended in connection with the formation or liquidation of the Federation's constituent entities, as well as with their renaming.

Putin noted that Russia's parliament is legally capable of changing the Constitution, but he argued that a national vote is necessary to make the amendments legitimate. While Putin said the package of amendments should be put to a nationwide vote, Kremlin spokesman Dmitry Peskov said that the vote does not entail a referendum. On 20 January 2020, Putin submitted a bill on constitutional amendments to the State Duma (the lower house of parliament). The amendment of the Constitution proposed by Putin requires neither a referendum, nor convening of the Russian Constitutional Assembly.

== Proposed consultative All-Russia voting ==
=== Terminology ===
The current Constitution of the Russian Federation was adopted by "nationwide voting" on 12 December 1993. This is an official term with legal meaning. Amendments or a new constitution can be also adopted by "nationwide voting".

Конституция Российской Федерации вступает в силу со дня официального ее опубликования по результатам всенародного голосования.

— Constitution of the Russian Federation, sect. 2, art. 137 p. 1
Translation:

The Constitution of the Russian Federation shall come into force from the moment of its official publication according to the results of a nationwide voting.

Article 3 of the 1993 Constitution of Russia says:

Высшим непосредственным выражением власти народа являются референдум и свободные выборы.

— Constitution of the Russian Federation, sect. 1, art. 3 p. 3
Translation:

The supreme direct expression of the power of the people shall be referendum and free elections.

Chapter 9 says:

2. Если предложение о пересмотре положений глав 1, 2 и 9 Конституции Российской Федерации будет поддержано тремя пятыми голосов от общего числа членов Совета Федерации и депутатов Государственной Думы, то в соответствии с федеральным конституционным законом созывается Конституционное Собрание.
3. Конституционное Собрание либо подтверждает неизменность Конституции Российской Федерации, либо разрабатывает проект новой Конституции Российской Федерации, который принимается Конституционным Собранием двумя третями голосов от общего числа его членов или выносится на всенародное голосование. При проведении всенародного голосования Конституция Российской Федерации считается принятой, если за нее проголосовало более половины избирателей, принявших участие в голосовании, при условии, что в нем приняло участие более половины избирателей.

— Constitution of the Russian Federation, ch. 9, art. 135 p. 2—3
Translation:

2. If a proposal on the review of the provisions of Chapters 1, 2 and 9 of the Constitution of the Russian Federation is supported by three fifths of the total number of the members of the Council of the Federation and the deputies of the State Duma, then according to federal constitutional law a Constitutional Assembly shall be convened.
3. The Constitutional Assembly shall either confirm the invariability of the Constitution of the Russian Federation or draft a new Constitution of the Russian Federation, which shall be adopted by the Constitutional Assembly by two thirds of the total number of its members or submitted to a nationwide voting. In case of a nationwide voting the Constitution of the Russian Federation shall be considered adopted, if over half of the voters who came to the polls supported it and under the condition that over half of the electorate participated in the voting.

Therefore, "referendum" (Russian: референдум, romanized: referendum), "free elections" (Russian: свободные выборы, romanized: svobodnyye vybory) and "nationwide voting" (Russian: всенародное голосование, romanized: vsenarodnoye golosovaniye) are provisioned by the Constitution. A 50%+ turnout is mandatory for "nationwide voting" according to the Article 135 of the 1993 Constitution of Russia.

The Federal Constitutional Law on the Referendum was adopted in 1995. A period of campaign, 50%+ turnout and international democratic electoral standards are mandatory for a referendum. The results of a referendum are binding and can't be changed unless a new referendum is held. Russian law does not provide for consultative referendums.

=== All-Russian voting ===
The renewal of the Constitution requires neither a referendum, nor the convening of the Constitutional Assembly, but an "All-Russian voting" (Russian: общероссийское голосование, romanized: obshcherossiyskoye golosovaniye) was provisioned by Article 2 of the draft law on making amendments to the Russian Constitution. This was a novel term introduced for this election and was theorized by some to be a symbolic way to approve presidential changes to the constitution rather than being a true referendum. This was echoed by critics who accused Putin of orchestrating a "constitutional coup" and seeking to fast-track changes to the country's political system.

== Voting procedure ==
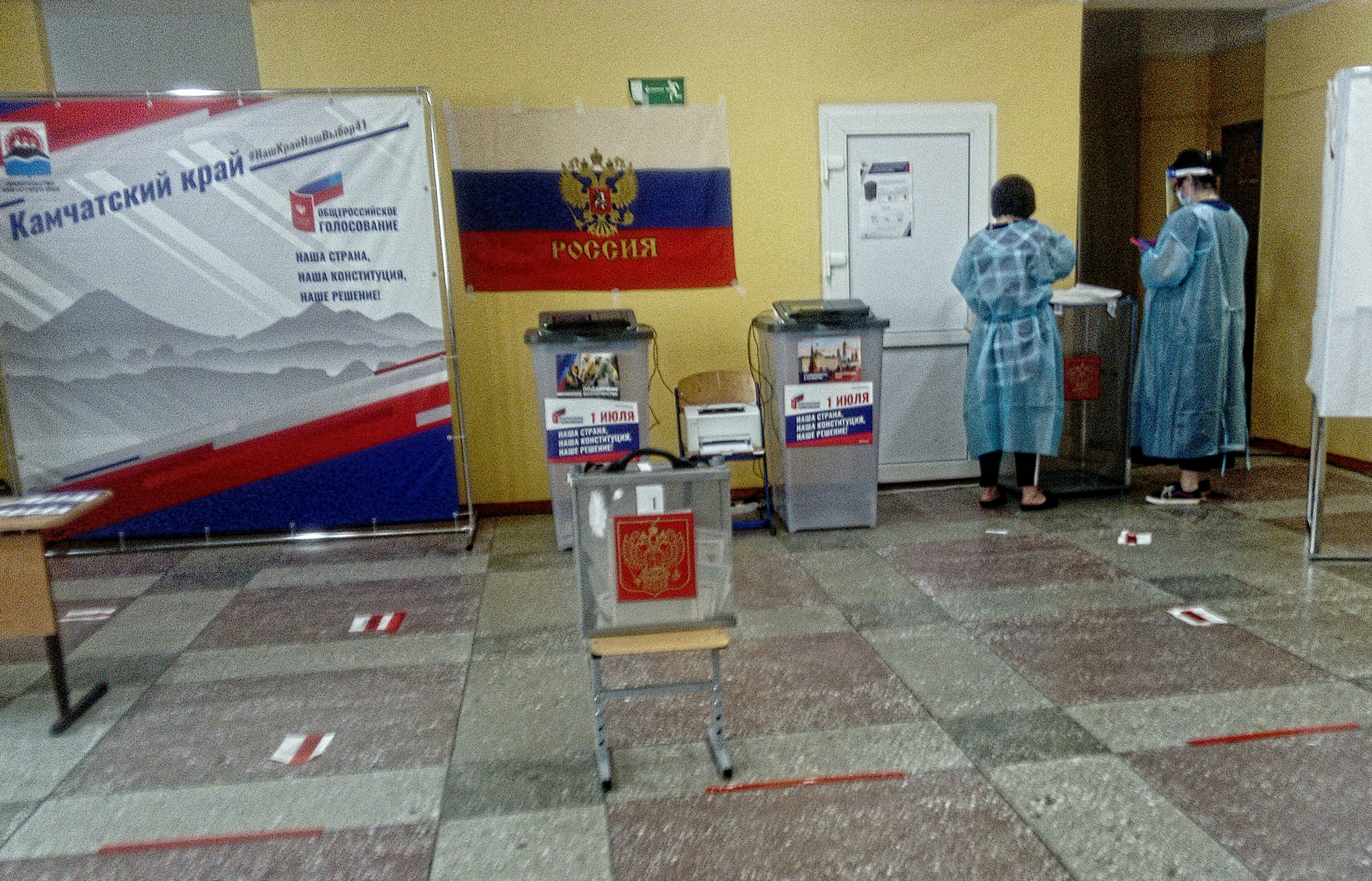
Voting station in Kamchatka Krai

In response to the COVID-19 pandemic, measures to prevent the spread of the disease were taken on the recommendation of the Federal Service for Surveillance on Consumer Rights Protection and Human Wellbeing (Rospotrebnadzor). These measures include extending the voting period to five days, screening for fever with a thermometer at the entrance to polling stations, providing polling station workers with personal protective equipment and encouraging social distancing.

Also, the Central Electoral Commission (CEC) meeting on 2 June came up with several voting options: outside the Precinct Electoral Committee (PEC) tied to the registration address through the Mobile Voter scheme; outside the polling station (in the adjacent territories), as well as contactless voting from home. Within the framework of this plebiscite, no valid reason is needed for voting from home, and the PEC agrees with the voter on the preferred time. These voting options are available not only on 1 July, but also from 25 to 30 June. Application submission is open until 21 June, for this purpose one should submit an application (including one over the phone) to vote at the preferred location – to the Territorial Election Commission (TEC), PEC, Multifunctional Centre for Public Services (MFC) or through the State Services (Gosuslugi) portal. There are also safety measures for those who vote from home: commission members and observers will not enter apartment or houses. They will be wearing personal protective equipment and also they will have to provide a voter with a kit with a mask, gloves, a pen and a sanitizer.

Remote electronic voting (REV), which was made available in the regions of Moscow and Nizhny Novgorod, was first tested in the Moscow City Duma elections in 2019. Application submission was made open until 2 pm. on 21 June. The voting went from the morning of 25 June until the end of the day on 30 June. The voters who have registered on the portals mos.ru and gosuslugi.ru after 5 June will not be able to take part in electronic voting in order to avoid "rigged" voting. Only those users who have successfully passed the check and matching against the data in the State Automates System "Elections" will be allowed to vote. Accounts with recently changed phone numbers will be blocked as well. A unified portal 2020og.ru and a special territorial commission have been created for remote electronic voting.

Special voting mode will be chosen at voting sites abroad. Each embassy and consulate will determine on its own if it is possible to arrange voting until 1 July.

Three categories of participants can observe and control the voting: members of the commission with the casting vote, observers and media representatives. The precinct commissions are formed in advance, observers can be sent to the all-Russian voting by the regional public chambers according to the applications submitted in advance, and the representatives of mass media must have an agreement with the editorial board concluded not later than two months before the voting appointment. It is stated that at the preliminary voting stage the CEC will publish daily data on the turnout, and the votes for and against will be counted only after the end of the voting on 1 July.

== Campaign ==
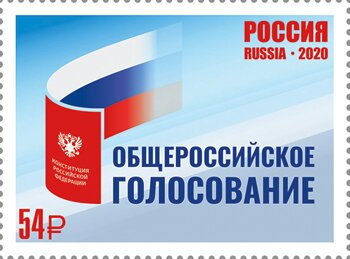
Russian postal stamp dedicated to the 2020 constitutional referendum, issued on 11 June 2020

Opposition movements, parties and politicians took a different attitude towards voting.

On 15 March 2020, activists protested against the amendments outside Russia's Constitutional Court in Saint Petersburg. Pavel Chuprunov read an appeal asking the judges to declare the amendments unconstitutional, and a correspondent for Current Time reported that police detained at least 22 participants.

As there is no minimum voter turn-out, the amendments will be considered approved and enacted if the majority of the actual voters agree with the changes. However, in order to demonstrate strong management skills, local authorities and state-funded organizations are using traditional tactics to increase voter participation and encouraging people to vote online and ahead-of-schedule.

The law that regulates nationwide voting does not mention any political agitation. Government authority has the right to inform the public, and the election committee is obliged to do so.

The telephone survey by MFC (Multifunctional center for the provision of state and municipal services) on voting on amendments to the Constitution of the Russian Federation. Questions about voting and the place of voting (in Russian). 25 June 2020 (first day of voting), Petrozavodsk.

The Opposition movement, various parties and politicians have different opinions regarding the voting: some are in its favor, some are against it (such as Open Russia and the Communist Party of the Russian Federation), some have chosen to boycott the referendum (such as the Left Front, Yabloko, and PARNAS). According to political analyst Alexander Pozhalov and founder of Yabloko Grigory Yavlinsky, voting on the amendments will essentially become a referendum on Putin's support, and according to Yavlinsky it opens the way to his lifelong rule. On 4 June, Communist Party leader Gennady Zyuganov called on his supporters to vote against the amendments. He said that "the new version of the Basic Law only strengthens the presidential dictatorship and consolidates oligarchic domination" in a statement. Furthermore, he said that the "July 1 vote is more of a ritual in nature. It does not have the status of a referendum, does not fit with the electoral law. All this once again exposes the falsity of bourgeois democracy." Zyuganov also said that the CEC organises the vote in "a legally dubious procedure" and that "there are unlimited possibilities for fraud." He said that a boycott of the vote would not do anything and that active participation is required.

A number of Russian celebrities were among the supporters of a 'yes' vote, who were sharing posts and video clips on social media. Those who have expressed their solidarity with the amendments over Instagram are mainly the ones who are promoting the online-voting. Among them are names such as Evgeni Plushenko and his wife Yana Rudkovskaya, TV hosts Olga Buzova and Kseniya Borodina, and singers Stas Mikhailov and Keti Topuria.

Various political and public figures have started the campaign "NET!” ("No!") against the constitutional amendments. Political activist Maksim Katz has been leading the campaign and strongly encouraging the voters to participate. The politician and founder of the Anti-Corruption Foundation, Alexei Navalny, called for a boycott of the referendum. Journalist Yury Dud voiced his opposition against the amendments, reminding the public that in 2008 the current president was against changing the Constitution as well.

On 28 February, the head of the Central Election Commission (CEC) of Russia Ella Pamfilova announced the abolition of the scientific and expert council at the commission, explaining this with its "absolutely unacceptable" form and "absolute anachronism". According to RBK, shortly before this, a number of board members wrote a letter criticizing the upcoming vote. Former board member and editor-in-chief of Ekho Moskvy radio station Alexei Venediktov publicly opposed expanding opportunities for early and home-based voting because of the inability to observe the process, which in his opinion could lead to a "discrediting of voting results", and linked the dissolution of the council with the negative attitude of its members towards the upcoming vote.

== Opinion polls ==
The survey results show a large variation in turnout forecasts and the final decision on the amendments. The experts attribute the difference to several factors: the peculiarities of the questions' wording and the initial orientation towards different audiences. A part of the population expresses distrust in the polling data – a long-term trend towards a decrease in trust in the data of opinion polls. Nevertheless, the last poll of 15 June by state-run VTsIOM recorded that 83% of respondents knew the date of the all-Russian vote, 68% of respondents expressed their intention to vote, 17% did not plan to vote.

Date(s) conducted	Pollster	For amendments	Against amendments	Undecided/unsure	Lead	Notes
22–24 May 2020	Levada Center	44%	32%	24%	12%	
22 May 2020	WCIOM	61%	22%	17%	39%	Only those planning to vote
24–27 April 2020	Levada Center	47%	31%	22%	16%	
24–26 April 2020	CIPKR	35%	26%	37%	2%	
17 April 2020	WCIOM	50%	26%	24%	24%	
2 April 2020	CIPKR	37%	25%	34%	12%	
19–25 March 2020	Levada Center	40%	34%	26%	6%	
19–25 March 2020	Levada Center	45%	41%	14%	4%	Sample given reworded question mentioning amendment allowing Putin to re-run in 2024
11 March 2020	WCIOM	46%	16%	38%	49%	
10 March 2020	President Vladimir Putin supported the amendment to the Constitution to reset the terms of the President of Russia and refused to hold snap legislative election					
7 March 2020	CIPKR	29%	17%	52%	23%	
3 March 2020	WCIOM	55%	12%	33%	30%	Only those planning to vote
20–26 February 2020	Levada Center	25%	10%	37%	12%	
12 February 2020	WCIOM	46%	16%	38%	30%	
29–31 January 2020	Levada Center	72%	13%	15%	59%	

=== Exit poll ===
Date(s) conducted	Pollster	Number of respondents	For amendments	Against amendments	Undecided/unsure	Lead	Notes
25–28 June 2020	WCIOM	163,100	76%	23.6%	29.4%	51.9%	

== Results ==
Choice	Votes	%
For	57,747,288	78.56
Against	15,761,978	21.44
Total	73,509,266	100.00
Valid votes	73,509,266	99.18
Invalid/blank votes	604,951	0.82
Total votes	74,114,217	100.00
Registered voters/turnout	109,190,337	67.88
Source: CEC

=== By federal subject ===
Turnout by federal subjects

Margins of victory by federal subjects

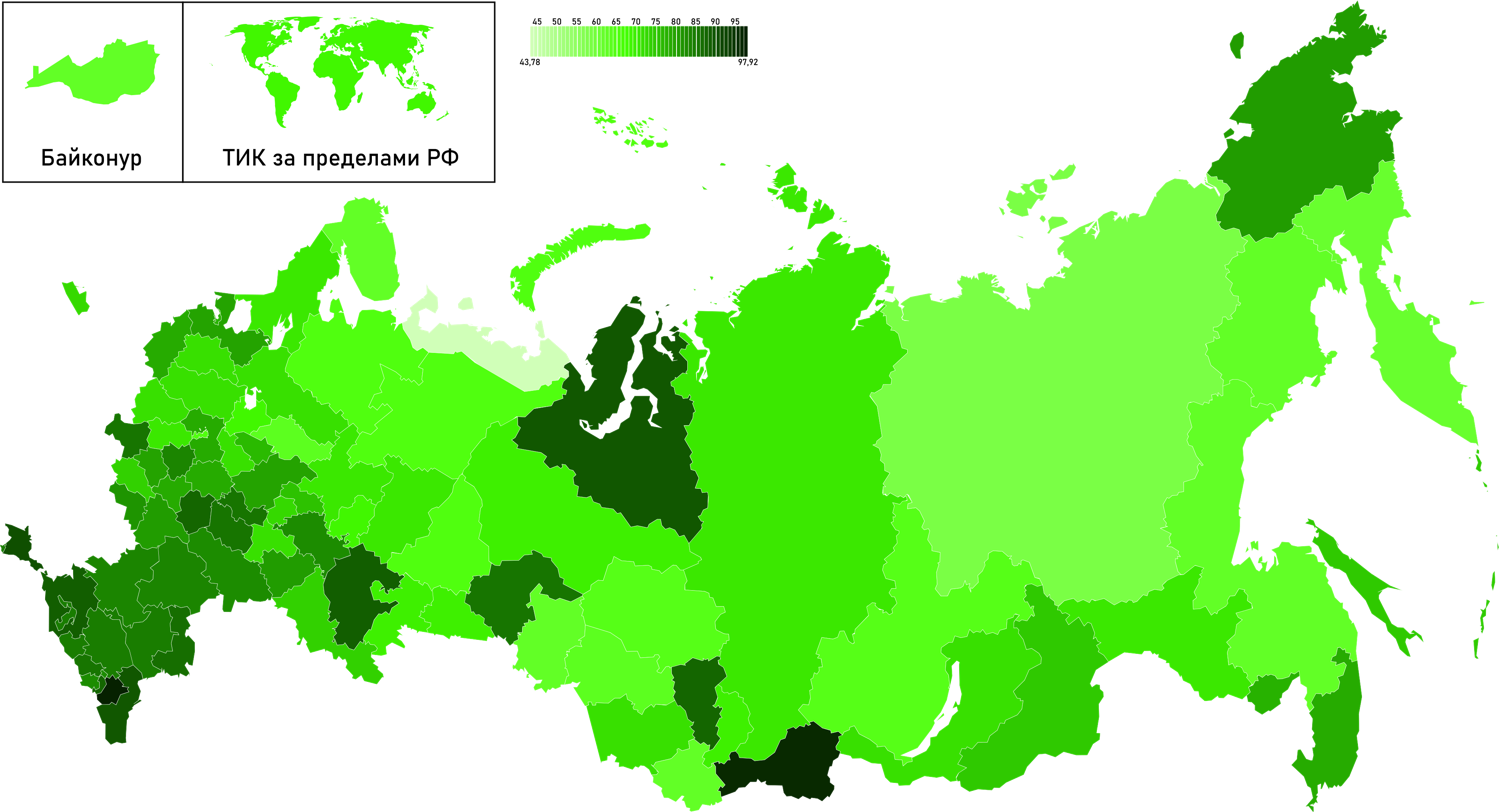
"Yes" by federal subjects

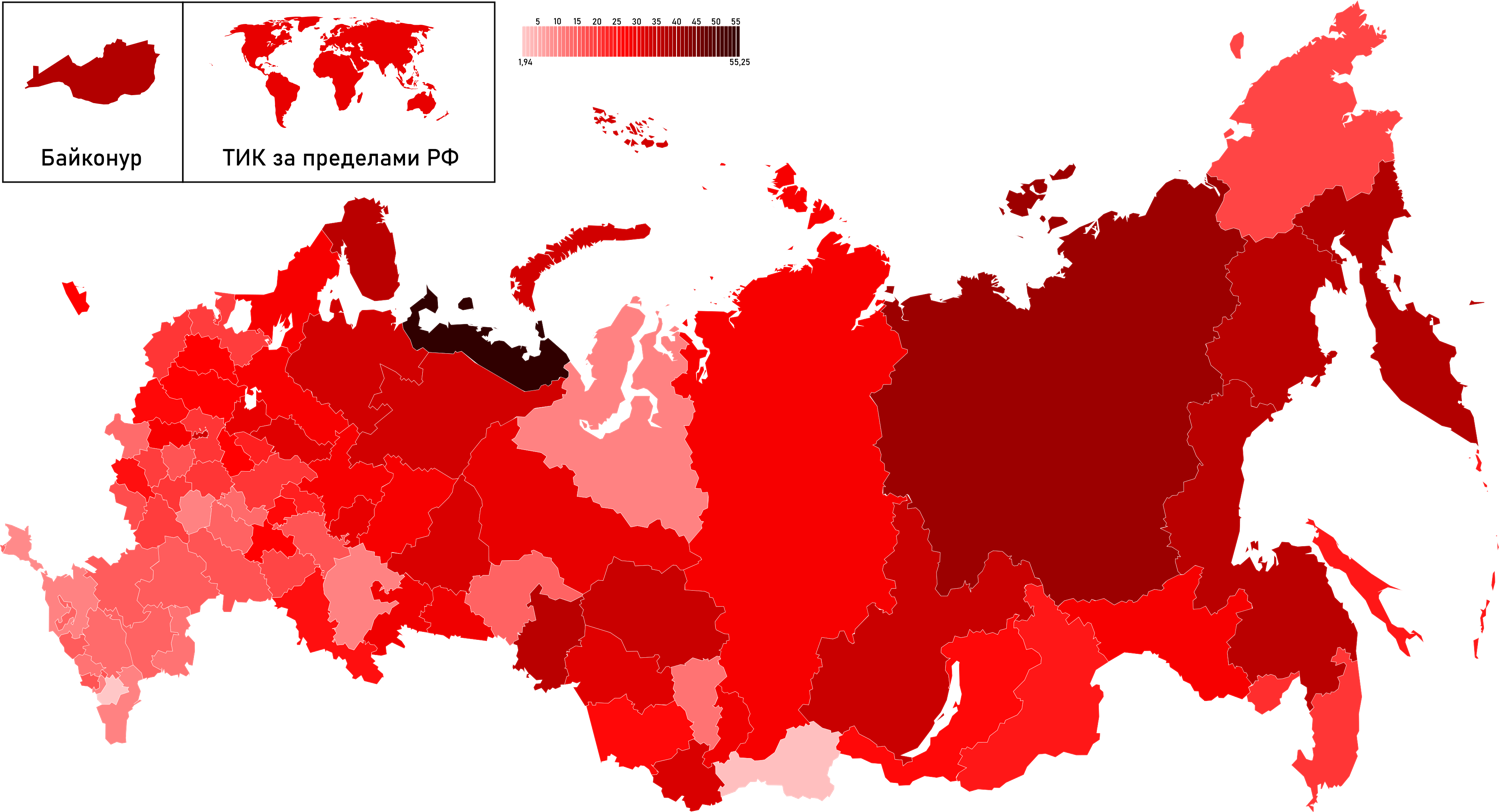
"No" by federal subjects

The percentages below are calculated from the total of voters instead of the total of valid votes. The difference from 100% thus consist of blank and invalid votes.

Region	Yes		No	
Region	Votes	%	Votes	%
Adygea	236,686	84.55	41,043	14.66
Altai Krai	645,603	71.91	241,132	26.86
Altai	55,291	66.16	27,433	32.83
Amur Oblast	258,548	70.42	103,726	28.25
Arkhangelsk Oblast	297,432	65.78	150,935	33.38
Astrakhan Oblast	463,866	86.73	68,087	12.73
Bashkortostan	2,448,685	88.68	292,701	10.60
Belgorod Oblast	798,636	81.76	170,172	17.42
Bryansk Oblast	749,749	85.81	114,009	13.05
Buryatia	329,208	71.95	121,205	26.49
Chechnya	712,909	97.92	14,132	1.94
Chelyabinsk Oblast	1,190,097	69.54	505,597	29.55
Chukotka	18,146	80.30	4,203	18.60
Chuvashia	426,779	72.57	154,351	26.25
Crimea	1,104,730	90.07	111,401	9.08
Dagestan	1,352,732	89.19	155,290	10.24
Ingushetia	152,992	87.50	18,972	10.85
Irkutsk Oblast	529,770	64.28	287,131	34.84
Ivanovo Oblast	390,256	76.23	117,846	23.02
Jewish Autonomous Oblast	70,213	77.30	19,430	21.39
Kabardino-Balkaria	362,739	85.52	53,795	12.68
Kaliningrad Oblast	334,755	72.15	125,341	27.02
Kalmykia	124,265	84.09	21,986	14.88
Kaluga Oblast	338,748	70.17	140,003	28.99
Kamchatka Krai	65,485	61.76	39,406	37.16
Karachay-Cherkessia	211,163	84.80	37,367	15.01
Karelia	168,389	70.46	68,304	28.58
Kemerovo Oblast	1,522,151	87.29	209,742	12.03
Khabarovsk Krai	271,421	62.28	159,662	36.64
Khakassia	141,381	69.52	59,758	29.38
Khanty-Mansi Autonomous Okrug	487,750	69.00	212,434	30.05
Kirov Oblast	409,702	70.89	163,247	28.25
Komi	221,113	65.08	115,322	33.94
Kostroma Oblast	180,846	67.92	83,044	31.19
Krasnodar Krai	3,219,153	88.92	382,712	10.57
Krasnoyarsk Krai	848,638	70.10	350,687	28.97
Kurgan Oblast	276,378	69.58	117,294	29.53
Kursk Oblast	389,300	73.92	133,471	25.32
Leningrad Oblast	817,168	79.38	203,833	19.80
Lipetsk Oblast	479,670	78.56	124,509	20.39
Magadan Oblast	34,035	62.03	20,090	36.62
Mari El	251,831	75.76	77,884	23.43
Mordovia	408,380	85.60	65,931	13.82
Moscow	2,855,547	65.29	1,485,963	33.97
Moscow Oblast	3,488,197	78.97	888,794	20.12
Murmansk Oblast	163,735	62.54	95,095	36.33
Nenets Autonomous Okrug	9,567	43.78	12,074	55.25
Nizhny Novgorod Oblast	1,505,620	79.31	382,801	20.16
North Ossetia	352,314	82.83	71,856	16.89
Novgorod Oblast	172,997	71.44	66,616	27.51
Novosibirsk Oblast	698,857	67.58	323,674	31.30
Omsk Oblast	610,278	62.09	360,348	36.66
Orenburg Oblast	834,406	73.60	286,720	25.29
Oryol Oblast	372,411	79.74	88,970	19.05
Penza Oblast	683,244	85.25	114,588	13.30
Perm Krai	734,802	70.75	293,643	28.27
Primorsky Krai	723,089	78.86	185,629	20.24
Pskov Oblast	231,684	78.69	60,626	20.59
Rostov Oblast	2,099,202	83.54	400,454	15.94
Ryazan Oblast	499,716	78.81	129,104	20.36
Saint Petersburg	2,241,963	77.66	624,517	21.63
Yakutia	204,435	58.34	142,464	40.65
Sakhalin Oblast	189,466	74.84	60,853	24.06
Samara Oblast	1,346,254	80.55	312,252	18.68
Saratov Oblast	1,187,697	82.24	244,989	16.96
Sevastopol	183,296	84.67	31,656	14.62
Smolensk Oblast	296,792	71.97	111,247	26.98
Stavropol Krai	1,304,638	84.85	213,467	13.88
Sverdlovsk Oblast	1,132,182	65.99	565,242	32.94
Tambov Oblast	583,972	87.41	80,138	11.99
Tatarstan	1,943,685	82.81	389,765	16.61
Tomsk Oblast	223,046	64.86	117,232	34.09
Tula Oblast	710,765	83.09	138,652	16.21
Tuva	175,698	96.79	5,426	2.99
Tver Oblast	410,421	71.87	155,409	27.21
Tyumen Oblast	748,290	85.57	122,759	14.04
Udmurtia	455,908	68.92	199,121	30.10
Ulyanovsk Oblast	379,056	71.16	148,346	27.85
Vladimir Oblast	419,606	71.18	164,025	27.82
Volgograd Oblast	1,222,903	83.39	232,524	15.86
Vologda Oblast	388,615	71.16	152,983	28.01
Voronezh Oblast	1,070,045	80.07	256,306	19.18
Yamalo-Nenets Autonomous Okrug	265,237	89.16	30,605	10.29
Yaroslavl Oblast	374,053	68.29	168,930	30.84
Zabaykalsky Krai	352,670	74.92	114,010	24.22
Baikonur	4,288	62.27	2,248	37.00
Russians abroad	99,852	68.07	44,939	30.64
Source: CEC

=== Results in the Nenets Autonomous Okrug ===
The Nenets Autonomous Okrug was the only subject of the federation where the majority of citizens (55%) voted 'No'.

The main reason is believed to be due to the strong disagreement by the residents of the subject of the federation to unite with Arkhangelsk Oblast. The interim governor of the Nenets Autonomous Okrug, Yuri Bezdudny, said: "Yes, the majority of the inhabitants of the Nenets spoke out against the Russian vote. But their voices are not against amendments, it is a reaction on the topic with the unification of the Nenets Autonomous Okrug and the Arkhangelsk Oblast. Nearly half of the district's residents spoke in favor of the amendments. Their opinion also needs to be respected. Most importantly, the elections in the Nenets Autonomous Region were fair, transparent, without violations and in compliance with all sanitary standards."

=== Results in the Komi Republic ===
Late in the evening of 1 July, after processing 5.2% of the protocols in the Komi Republic, 68.88% of the participants voted against amendments to the Constitution, 29.93% voted in favor. However, after a few minutes, the results were reversed. The Central Election Commission specified that after processing 28.31% of the protocols 66.19% of the voters supported the constitutional amendments in the republic, 32.89% were against. CEC Chairman Ella Pamfilova explained that the cause of the error was the tiredness of the election commission members: "Well, elementary, as I was told, people were tired. The line has slipped – and that’s it, sorry".

Grigory Kablis, the former chairman of the party of the Progress Party in the Komi Republic, explained to the publication Seven by Seven that since the data of the final protocols are not entered manually, but using QR codes through the GAS Vybory system (starting in 2017 in the Komi Republic), then the operator error during data entry was excluded. Kablis suggested that after receiving at 21:00 automatically the preliminary results, which he called "very different from the average for Russia", at about 21:05 all territorial election commissions in the Komi Republic were forbidden to enter data in the GAS Vybory. Those polling stations that showed negative results were ordered to recount ballots. In general, Kablis concluded that "there was no trust in the electoral system of Russia in general and the Komi Republic in particular", he said.

== Reactions ==
A number of foreign leaders congratulated President Putin by phone, including President of Azerbaijan Ilham Aliyev, Prime Minister of India Narendra Modi, President of Kazakhstan Kassym-Jomart Tokayev, President of Tajikistan Emomali Rahmon and President of Uzbekistan Shavkat Mirziyoyev.

The United States said that it was "troubled by reports of Russian government efforts to manipulate the result of the recent votes on constitutional amendments." The European External Action Service said that it "expect[s] all reports and allegations of irregularities, including voter coercion, multiple voting, violation of secrecy of the vote and allegations of police violence against a journalist who was present to observe, to be duly investigated."

On 19 November 2021, two members of the United States Congress introduced a resolution to end the country's recognition of Vladimir Putin as president of Russia if he remains in power after 2024. The Kremlin denounced it as an attempt to meddle in its domestic affairs.

=== Accusations of fraud and coercion ===
Forbes and The Moscow Times discussed allegations of fraud presented by physicist Sergei Shpilkin, who alleged that 22 million votes could be fraudulent, and alleged similar tactics to those used in both the 2011 legislative election and 2018 presidential election, for which he previously published statistical evidence alleging fraud.

The Associated Press reported that prizes were offered as encouragement to vote, that voters with Russian passports from eastern Ukraine were bused across the border to vote, that during early voting several ballot boxes were unattended at night, and that in Moscow, some journalists and activists said they were able to cast their ballots both online and in person in a bid to show the lack of safeguards against manipulations.

Golos, an independent Russian election watchdog, claimed that the electoral process was "rigged from the start" and "unfairly skewed by a noisy one-sided propaganda campaign."

The New York Times reported that employees at state-funded libraries in St. Petersburg complained that they had been ordered by their institutions to vote and on which day. The newspaper also suggested that "a long propaganda campaign preceded the referendum", and that public discourse focused mainly on the patriotic elements of the bill, such as remembering the war dead of World War II, enshrining the Russian language, and pension protection. The controversial elements, such as the zeroing of Putin's previous terms and a weakening of judicial independence, saw almost no mention in official messaging or public discourse. At polling station No. 1802 in Saint Petersburg, voting commission member Pavel Chuprunov was removed after requesting to observe the vote count; the commission cited his lack of a negative COVID-19 test. A district court later sentenced him to ten days' administrative detention for alleged disobedience of police, but the Saint Petersburg City Court overturned the decision and released him after six days.
