= EMIAS =

Russian information system

United Medical Information and Analytical System of Moscow ("EMIAS")
- Original author(s): Moscow Government
- Developer(s): Moscow IT department, Moscow City Health Department
- Initial release: 21 May 2013
- Project goal(s): To improve the quality and access of the medical services in the public health facility
- Funding: Moscow Government
- Available in: Russian
- Type: E-Government
- Website: emias.info

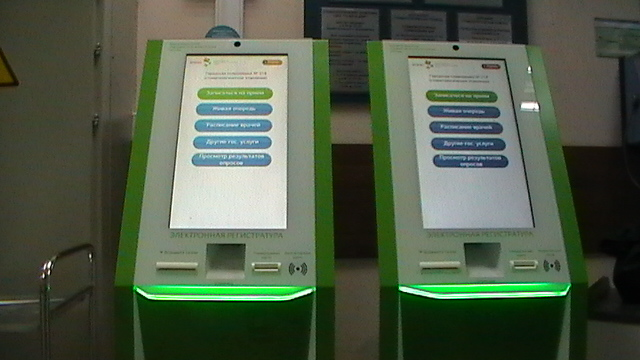
EMIAS terminals

Unified Medical Information and Analytical System of Moscow (Russian: Единая медицинская информационно-аналитическая система) (known in its acronym EMIAS) is an information system that automatises the booking of hospital visits and work of medical professionals in Moscow. The system includes online appointment services, electronic health record management, and electronic prescribing based on cloud technology. EMIAS is the digital system designed to increase the quality and access of medical services in public health clinics. The project was designed and is being implemented as part of the "Digital city" program of the Moscow government and is one of the E-Government projects in Russia.

== General information ==
The project is developed and being implemented as part of "Digital city" program by Moscow IT department. As of October 2013, 557 public health facilities including female counselling centers and dental clinics got involved in EMIAS. Furthermore, EMIAS is organizing and uniting information between outpatient and inpatient facilities.

The system allows managing flows of patients, contains outpatient card integrated in the system, and provides an opportunity to manage consolidated managerial accounting and personalized list of medical help. Besides that, the system contains information about availability of the medical institutions and various doctors. EMIAS allows managing medical registers to resolve medical organizing questions concerning different categories of people, having specific diseases.

EMIAS is being implemented in three steps. The first step is switching the registration process to be completely electronic at public clinics and hospitals. This will allow people to schedule a visit to a doctor remotely. The second step of implementation is creating medical records and using electronic prescriptions for each patient which will be consolidated and shared throughout the public medical sector. The third step will be in uniting the public medical sector with the private medical sector through the sharing of medical records and the introduction of EMIAS services.

In 2016, in a study by PricewaterhouseCoopers (PWC) “Cities Managing Data” in the field of healthcare informatization, Moscow took a leading position and became the only one of the cities studied where the Unified Emias City Polyclinics System was fully implemented. In 2021, the EMIAS.Info mobile application was included in the five winners of the EHEALTHCARE LEADERSHIP Awards International Prize, having received an honorary prize in the category of “Best Platform-oriented Appendix”.

== Modules ==
Electronic Health Records	Patient flow management system
Statements and statistics	Resource management (schedule)
Analysis and monitoring	e-Prescriptions
Statements and statistics	Hospitalization records issuing
Laboratory integration	Periodic health examination
Accounting system integration	Services record (Compulsory health insurance; voluntary health insurance; commercial services)

== Executives ==
- Yermolaev Artem - Minister of Moscow Government, Head of Moscow City IT Department
- Makarov Vladimir - Deputy Head of Moscow City IT Department, EMIAS General constructor.
