= GAS Vybory =

Russian election software

State Automated System of the Russian Federation "Vybory" (Russian: Государственная автоматизированная система Российской Федерации «Выборы») known in its acronym GAS Vybory (Russian: ГАС «Выборы») is a state information system in the Russian Federation designed to automate and digitize electoral processes.

GAS "Vybory" comprises several components, including the "Register of Voters and Referendum Participants" system (abbreviated as RIUR).

== Overview ==
GAS "Vybory" is a geographically distributed, automated, nationwide telecommunications system designed to manage information processes during the preparation and conduct of elections and referendums, as well as to handle tasks unrelated to elections and referendums in accordance with established procedures. The system enables comprehensive management of the electoral process at all stages: planning for the preparation and conduct of elections, voter registration, entry of candidate data, voting, tallying of results, and subsequent statistical processing.

Furthermore, the system incorporates functions to coordinate the operations of election commissions at various levels, enabling the tallying of votes in near real-time and the dissemination of results to every Russian citizen via display systems and the Internet.

== History ==
The decision to establish the GAS "Vybory" (State Automated System "Elections") was made by Decree of the President of the Russian Federation No. 1723 of August 23, 1994, "On the Development and Creation of the State Automated System of the Russian Federation 'Vybory'". This was preceded by the approval—a year earlier, on July 12, 1994—of the concept for establishing the Central Election Commission of Russia, and even earlier by a "Conceptual Memorandum on the Program for Developing and Creating the 'Vybory' [Elections] State Automated System of the Russian Federation", drafted in mid-1994 by staff at the Voskhod Research Institute based on research into electoral technologies..

Yuri Sergeyevich Lomov, the chief designer, oversaw the creation of the "Vybory" State Automated System at the FSUE Voskhod Research Institute—a first for the USSR.]

The system's primary client was the Central Election Commission of the Russian Federation. The client's representative was the Federal Center for Informatization under the Russian CEC (FCI under the Russian CEC).

Since the initial phase of the "Vybory" system had been developed in the 1990s, its technical infrastructure was outdated by 2001. On July 31, 2002, the Central Election Commission (CEC) of the Russian Federation approved a large-scale program to develop and modernize the system through 2004. Companies such as CROC Incorporated, Rosnet, Informzashchita, Insoft, and AND Project participated in the modernization effort led by the Voskhod Research Institute, working in close cooperation with the Russian offices of HP, Oracle, and Cisco Systems. Alexander Kalinin served as the chief designer of the modernized system. On the CEC side, in addition to CEC Chairman Alexander Veshnyakov, responsibility for the project's implementation lay with Viktor Yashchenko, the head of the FCI under the Russian CEC, and his staff.

The second phase of the "Vybory" system was developed by the FSUE Voskhod Research Institute (under Director Leonid Yukhnevich, who took office in 2002) at the behest of the Russian CEC and the FCI under the Russian CEC in 2003. The modernization program was implemented strictly on schedule, becoming a rare example of effective state IT planning. The results were unprecedented for the time. The processing speed for final vote tally protocols at the Central Election Commission level increased 150-fold; for the first time, voting results for each of the country's 94,000 polling stations were published on the Russian CEC website within 24 hours of the polls closing. A centralized database covering Russia's 109 million voters was established. In 2004, the system entered full operational status after successfully passing state acceptance tests a second time. The GAS "Vybory" platform, built in 2003, relied on foreign base software (Windows, Oracle DBMS) but utilized entirely domestic specialized software comprising approximately 950 MB of code. This version of the system proved its reliability by supporting the country's election cycles for many years.

There is a possibility of the system being misused to manipulate results. For instance, the secretary of the Territorial Election Commission in Orekhovo-Zuyevo—who was also the GAS "Vybory" system administrator—altered data in 13 out of 58 protocols, increasing the number of voters by approximately 6,000 and raising turnout from 49.8% to 55.7%. Tsarkov was found guilty and fined 20,000 rubles.

In 2017, a hardware-software complex was created to enable interaction between GAS "Vybory" and the Unified System of Interdepartmental Electronic Interaction (SMEV). Integration was also established between GAS "Vybory" and the Unified Portal of State Services. In particular, it became possible to submit applications to vote to the location [of the voter] in electronic form. In 2019, it was reported that improvements to the interaction with the Interdepartmental Electronic Interaction System enabled election commissions to verify the accuracy of information regarding candidates' professional education by checking Ministry of Education databases.

According to a statement made by CEC Chair Ella Pamfilova in November 2020, the Central Election Commission plans to create a new digital platform by 2022 to replace the GAS "Vybory" (State Automated System "Elections") system. It was announced that, as part of the "Digital Economy" national program, a "fundamentally new digital platform" would be created by 2022, transitioning election commissions to "state-of-the-art working methods". This new platform is intended to include a new registry of data on election participants and aims to guarantee citizens' right to "extraterritorial" voting. On December 2, 2020, the Central Election Commission officially presented and adopted as a basis the "Concept for Creating a Digital Platform for Implementing the Fundamental Guarantees of the Electoral Rights of Citizens of the Russian Federation". Among other things, this concept entails bringing current Russian legislation into alignment with the new services.

At the same time, as reported by Vedomosti, the Central Election Commission planned to maintain the GAS "Vybory" system until at least 2022, while utilizing its infrastructure for a new digital platform intended to replace the existing system. The CEC was to commission the development of this new system, with the resulting platform handed over to the Federal Center for Informatization for operation.

However, the launch promised for 2022 did not take place; the Central Election Commission went through years of iterations, testing, and postponements. During this protracted process, the move to replace GAS "Vybory" with a new version was also justified by the fact that the old system relied on "foreign tools" that were "no longer supported by their creators". The key infrastructural difference in GAS "Vybory" 2.0 was the shift from a geographically distributed network to a strictly centralized platform. The new system is built around a unified online voter registry that synchronizes in real time with databases from the Ministry of Internal Affairs, the Federal Tax Service, and the Civil Registry Office. GAS "Vybory" 2.0 underwent its final testing phase in 2025. To avoid catastrophic failures, the CEC employed both systems during the 2025 Unified Voting Day: the new version served as the primary system, while the older, proven version 1.3.1 operated in parallel as a backup. On January 29, 2026, it was announced that the Central Election Commission would put GAS "Vybory" 2.0 into full operational use starting February 6, 2026.. Тем же решением старая версия ГАС «Выборы» была окончательно выведена из эксплуатации и демонтирована, уйдя в историю после более чем двадцати лет работы By the same decision, the old version of the GAS "Vybory" system was finally decommissioned and dismantled, passing into history after more than twenty years of operation.
