= Gosuslugi =

Russian e-government portal

Portal of public services of the Russian Federation
- Available in: Russian
- Founded: December 15, 2009; 16 years ago
- Owners: Ministry of Digital Development, Communications and Mass Media, Rostelecom
- Creator: NVision Group (Энвижн Груп)
- Website: www.gosuslugi.ru

The Federal State Information System "Unified Portal of State and Municipal Services (Functions)" (Russian: Федеральная государственная информационная система «Единый портал государственных и муниципальных услуг (функций)»), commonly referred to as Gosuslugi (Russian: Госуслуги), is a digital platform operated by the Russian government. The platform was established in 2011 with the aim of providing individuals and legal entities with online access to information about state and municipal services in the Russian Federation, as well as providing electronic forms for these services.

Gosuslugi allows users to access information about state functions related to control and supervision, as well as services provided by state and municipal institutions and organizations involved in the delivery of state and municipal services. All services offered on the portal are linked to specific regions of Russia, with the availability of these services and their conditions for provision determined by the location where the service is requested.

As of December 30, 2020, the platform had registered 126 million users in Russia.

== History ==
Logging screen of Gosuslugi, 2026

The predecessor of the Internet portal Gosuslugi.ru was the site ogic.ru, developed by the Federal State Unitary Enterprise 'Scientific and Research Institute Voskhod'. After the change of leadership of the Ministry of Communications, it was decided to develop a new portal.

In August 2009, the Government of the Russian Federation appointed Rostelecom as the sole executor of the activities of the 'Electronic Russia' program in terms of designing and creating an e-government infrastructure; among these activities was also included the provision of public services in electronic form. On October 17, 2009, the Government approved a plan for the transition to the provision of public services and the performance of public functions in electronic form by federal executive authorities. Regional and municipal services were subject to transfer into electronic form on the basis of agreements concluded with the executive authorities of the regions of Russia and local governments.

The customer of the project to create the Gosuslugi.ru portal was Rostelecom, the direct executor of the project was Group NVision. On November 25, 2009, the Internet portal of public services was launched in test mode. The official opening of the portal took place on December 15, 2009 (at the same time, the launch of the site was accompanied by significant difficulties). The portal posted information about 110 federal level services and more than 200 regional and municipal ones.

Amid the Russian invasion of Ukraine on February 26, 2022, the digital platform was targeted by a series of hacker attacks. Over 50 distributed-denial-of-service (DDoS) attacks, with a capacity of more than 1 TB, were recorded on the platform. As a result, the Ministry of Digital Development issued a warning to users that there could be potential interruptions in the portal's functioning.

From March 1, 2023, the Ministry of Digital Development has improved security and introduced two-factor authentication on the portal. Now the user must use one of three methods of identity verification: by SMS, by one-time code (TOTP) and by biometrics. From June 1, 2023, the new authorization system became mandatory for all users.

In April 2023, the Russian State Duma has passed legislation to change the nature of conscription summons and how they are served. Previously a summons had to be physically served on the person being called up. Now a summons is deemed to be served once it appears on the government services portal on Gosuslugi. Failure to obey such a summons could mean potential "bans on driving, registering a company, working as a self-employed individual, obtaining credit or loans, selling apartments, buying property or securing social benefits."

According to Russian Deputy Prime Minister Dmitry Chernyshenko, Gosuslugi averaged 11 million daily visitors in 2023 and delivered 340 million services.

One way Russians are encouraged to use the Max app is to require it in order to use Gosuslugi functions.
