= 2020 amendments to the Constitution of Russia =

Amendments to the Constitution of Russian Federation proposed by Vladimir Putin

The amendments of 2020, which were proposed in January 2020, are the second substantial amendments to the Constitution of Russia of 1993. To introduce these amendments, Vladimir Putin, president of Russia, held a national vote. They were approved on 1 July by a popular vote.

After Putin's signing of an presidential decree on 3 July to officially introduce the amendments into the Russian Constitution, they took effect on 4 July.

== History ==
Since the ratification of the Constitution in 1993, several amendments were proposed. In 2008, in order to extend the presidential and State Duma terms, as well as require an annual report by the prime minister for the Duma members, four articles were changed. In early 2014, eight more amendments were ratified and one repealed, which resulted in the abolition of the High Court of Arbitration and the adjustment of prosecutor assignments. In mid-2014, two more articles were changed in order to allow the president to choose up to 10% (17 members) of the Federation Council.

President Putin made new proposals during his annual address to the Federal Assembly on 15 January 2020. The amendments were prepared by a commission appointed by Putin, headed by academician Taliya Habrieva, Senator Andrey Klishas, and MP Pavel Krasheninnikov.

According to Articles 136 and 108, amendments to the provisions of Chapters 3–8, require the same approval as a federal constitutional law, that is, a two-thirds supermajority vote in the State Duma (the lower house), a three-fourths supermajority vote in the Federation Council (the upper house), and ratification by two-thirds of the 85 regional legislatures of the federal subjects (57 regional ratifications required for an amendment to come into effect).

The president formally submitted the bill to the State Duma on 20 January. On 11 March, the State Duma, dominated by pro-government parties, swiftly approved the proposals in the third reading with no objection. By 13 March, legislative assemblies of all 85 federal subjects approved the amendments to the Constitution. On 16 March the Constitutional Court of Russia gave their approval to the amendments.

== Background ==
According to Point 3 of Article 81 of the Constitution of Russia, the same person cannot hold a position of the presidency of the Russian Federation more than two terms in a row. This meant that Vladimir Putin, who was elected president in 2012 and re-elected in 2018, would not have been able to participate in the 2024 presidential election. In 2018 Putin claimed he would not hold the presidency for more than two consecutive terms and denied the possibility of his participation in the 2024 election.

Amendments to the Constitution of Russia solved the so-called "2024 problem" regarding the end of Putin's presidential term in that year.

According to a Gallup International opinion poll conducted in December 2017, if the person for whom voters wanted to vote (in 77% of cases this was Vladimir Putin) was not on the ballot in the elections, 46% would not have known who else to vote for and 19% would have invalidated their ballots. Valery Fedorov, the Director of the Russian Public Opinion Research Center, claimed the Russian population had not thought about this problem. Focus group participants gathered by the Levada Center identified two main solutions: preservation of presidential powers by Vladimir Putin and the appointment of a successor. In 2018, Valery Zorkin proposed changing the constitution, so Putin could remain in office. However, later in March, Putin explicitly said he was not going to change the Constitution in an interview with Megyn Kelly. Sergei Markov said that Putin repeatedly ruling out the abolition of term limits led to discussions of possible scenarios for 2024 to a standstill. In the end, despite earlier promises, the restrictions that prevented Putin from remaining president of the Russian Federation were changed.

According to political analyst Kirill Rogov, the constitutional design of Russian statehood remained unclear due to the unsuccessful experience of the "tandem" and the lack of institutions of distributed power. In addition to the obvious conflict between Putin's political regime and the official state system, there were also security issues for Putin and his family if he completely leaves office, as well as issues with the constitution which guarantees that as an eventual certainty.

== Proposed amendments ==
In 2020, 41 articles were rewritten and five more were added. Excluding the 1st, 2nd and the 9th chapters, which can be changed only by calling together a Constituent Assembly and developing a new Constitution, around 60% of articles were altered. The main amendments focus on how power is distributed between the branches of government: moving away from the super-presidential system that was established in 1993 and simultaneously creating a new one based on the principle of checks and balances.

In general, the following amendments were proposed:

- Remove the "in a row" clause from the article regulating the maximum number of presidential terms, discounting previous presidential terms before the amendment enters into force. This would nullify the number of presidential terms previously served by president Putin, and allow him to serve two further terms, hence to run for election in 2024. Former president Dmitry Medvedev would have been allowed to serve another two terms in any case, as his last ended in 2012 (as well as Yeltsin, had he been alive) but any further two terms, whether consecutive, would be definite;
- The Russian Constitution should take precedence over international law;
- The State Duma (the lower house of Parliament) should have the right to approve the Prime Minister's candidacy (currently it only gives consent to his appointment), the State Duma will also be able to approve the candidates of Deputy Prime Ministers and Federal Ministers, the President will not be able to refuse their appointment, but in some cases will be able to remove them from office;
- Persons who hold "important positions for ensuring the country's security" (President, Ministers, judges, heads of regions) should not have foreign citizenship or residence permit in other countries, either at the time of their work in office or, in the case of the President, at any time before;
- A presidential candidate must live in Russia for at least 25 years (previously 10 years) and may not have ever in their life held foreign citizenship or residency (with no possibility of renouncing foreign citizenship to become eligible to be president);
- The Federation Council (the upper house of Parliament) will be able to propose that the President dismiss federal judges; in some cases, the Federation Council, on the proposal of the President, will have the right to remove judges of the Constitutional and Supreme courts;
- Particular ministers who are the heads of law enforcement agencies must be appointed by the President in consultation with the Federation Council;
- The minimum wage cannot be lower than the subsistence minimum;
- Regular indexation of pensions;
- Consolidation of the status and role of the State Council (at present it is only an advisory body and is not prescribed in the Constitution);
- Granting the Constitutional Court the ability to check the constitutionality of laws adopted by the Federal Assembly of the Russian Federation at the request of the President before they are signed by the President;
- Defining marriage as a relationship between one man and one woman.

Along with the redistribution of power initiatives, the first draft included a couple of social- and economically directed amendments. Specifically, Putin has suggested to require the minimum wage to be above the poverty line and to guarantee an annual increase in pension payments. The amendments from this block were developed by a special group consisting of parliament members, scientists and public representatives. As a result of their work, the Constitution was supplemented by articles imposing a distinct government attitude towards such things as public health, science, culture, voluntary work and young people. In addition, the amendments have a few innovations, such as regarding the Russian language as a "language of the state-forming people", protecting "historical truth" and mentioning faith in God in regards to heritage. Most of these amendments do not embody new concepts, but rather duplicate norms that are already found in federal laws. One of the amendments banned the ceding of Russian territory to foreign powers.

== Enactment ==
The amendments have been put to a national vote, initially called for April 2020 but later postponed due to the COVID-19 pandemic. They were rescheduled for 1 July 2020 (with early voting allowed from 25 June 2020).

The voting procedure was decided on already during the development process. Before that, there was no concept of a "nationwide voting". The approved procedure is noticeably different from a regular voting or a referendum: just a month of preparation instead of 90–100 days; the observers can be only from the Public Chambers, which are formed by federal and regional authorities; "informing the public" regarding the content of the amendments instead of agitation; no minimum voter turn-out; an online-voting option.

With 98% of the ballot counted, and with 78% voting in favor versus 22% against, the amendments easily passed.

== Criticism ==
The amendments were seen as allowing President Vladimir Putin to continue serving as president after 2024. Under the previous version of the constitution, Putin would have been required to step down in 2024.

The main debates around the whole arrangement were caused by the change of the amending procedure of the Constitution itself (which is stated in chapter 9). A new three-step procedure was imposed. After approval by federal and regional parliaments, only the third article describing the enforcement procedure of the change was enacted. After the Constitutional Court had validated the document, the second article was enacted, which regulated the nationwide voting procedure. The first article, which consists of all the amendments, can be enacted only when approved by the majority of voters.

The amendments also received criticism for contradicting the first two chapters of the Constitution. In particular, criticisms targeted the amendments, which involved religious issues, the superiority of the Constitution over the interstate authority, the President's right to remove judges, and the consolidation of local authority into a "single public authority system." However, after examination of the amendments in question, as well as the one discounting previous presidential terms before the amendment enters into force, the Constitutional Court found no contradictions.

Some consider the introduction and adoption of the amendments as being a form of self-coup or autocoup as it removed term limits on the Presidency and grants Putin more authority.

== Foreign analysis ==
The New York Times wrote that the proposed prohibition of same-sex marriage was "an effort to raise turnout for a constitutional referendum that could keep him in power and has stirred big enthusiasm among Russians".

The Guardian wrote that "[t]he move, announced by Putin in January, was initially seen as a way for him to hold on to power after 2024, when as things stand he will no longer be able to serve as president because of term limits." The Guardian further noted that "Putin's direct support for the amendments makes it likely they will go through. He has taken an increasingly conservative turn in his fourth term as president".

Will Partlett has written that the amendments are an example of "theatrical constitution-making" that is being used to support authoritarian populism in Russia. The amendments therefore constitutionalise legislative trends toward centralism, personalism, and protectionism.

== The position of the Venice Commission ==
On 16 March 2020, 128 Russian lawyers, political scientists and human rights defenders, including the member of the Constitutional Conference of the Russian Federation Georgy Satarov, the professor of the Higher School of Economics, doctor of sciences in jurisprudence Irina Alebastrova, the professor of the Institute of Political Studies Sergei Guriev, and human rights defender Lev Ponomaryov, addressed to the Council of Europe with the petition requesting a legal assessment to the amendments to the Constitution. The petition was posted on Change.org where it garnered over 200,000 signatures by 27 May. On that day the Council of Europe decided to send the request to the Venice Commission. The commission should check for compliance with European and international standards of democracy and the rule of law, as well as with Russia's legal obligations as a member of the Council of Europe.

On 18 June, the opinion of the Venice Commission on the draft amendments to the Constitution (as signed by the president of the Russian Federation on 14 March) related to the execution in the Russian Federation of decisions by the European Court of Human Rights was published. The Commission indicated that there is no choice to execute or not to execute the European Court of Human Rights judgment: under Article 46 of the European Convention on Human Rights the judgments of the ECtHR are binding. The proposed amendments use the notion "contrary to the Constitution", which is too broad a formula, broader than that of current Article 79 of the Constitution ("limiting the rights and freedoms of the individual and the citizen or contradicting the fundamentals of the constitutional system of the Russian Federation"). These concerns should be seen against the backdrop of the proposed amendment to Article 83 of the Constitution, empowering the Council of the Federation to dismiss the judges of the Constitutional Court at the request of the President.

On 23 March 2021, the opinion of the Venice Commission on constitutional amendments to the Constitution and the procedure for their adoption was published. The Commission welcomed that the amendments bring about several positive changes (the increased protection of social rights, the two-term limitation of the mandate of the President, the possibility for the President to refer to the Constitutional Court the use of a presidential veto, the constitutionalisation of the State Council, which has, already for two decades, operated based solely on an executive legal act, the extension of parliamentary control, including the possibility of carrying out inquiries into the heads of state bodies and the competence to "hear" the annual report of the Prosecutor of the Russian Federation, the introduction of a fixed six-year term for most of the Senators of the Federation Council). Nonetheless, the commission has identified some serious flaws in the Constitution and the procedure of its adoption.

The Commission indicated that on a general note raising to the constitutional level (constitutionalising) existing provisions of ordinary law creates a risk of excluding the issues in question from open debate and thus restricts democracy. Constitutionalised norms become more rigid; they cannot be reviewed by the Constitutional Court and become, on the contrary, the Court's yardstick for evaluating other legal provisions.

The Commission concluded that the amendments disproportionately strengthened the position of the President of the Russian Federation and have done away with some of the checks and balances originally foreseen in the Constitution. The ad hominem exclusion from the term limits of the current and previous Presidents (Vladimir Putin and Dmitry Medvedev) contradicts the very logic of the adopted amendment limiting the President's mandate to two terms. The unusually wide scope of immunity, taken together with rules of impeachment that make it very difficult to dismiss a President raise serious concerns as to the accountability of the President. The President has acquired additional powers at the expense of the Chair of the Government. The increase in the number of Senators appointed by the President may give the latter additional leverage, thus raising doubts as to whether the Federation Council will be independent enough from the executive to be able to exercise the monitoring functions entrusted to it by the Constitution. Taken together, these changes go far beyond what is appropriate under the principle of separation of powers, even in presidential regimes.

The Commission found that the amendments to the provisions relating to the judiciary, notably the power for the President to initiate the dismissal of apex court presidents as well as presidents, vice-presidents and judges of the cassation and appeal courts on very vague grounds affect the core element of judicial independence. Taken together, the amendments to the provisions on the judiciary amount to a danger to the rule of law in the Russian Federation.

Furthermore, the Commission concluded that the amendments weaken constituent subjects and local self-government bodies. The inclusion of provisions referring to the Russian nation creates a tension with the multi-ethnic character of the Russian Federation.

As to the procedure of the adoption of the amendments, the Venice Commission concluded that the speed of the preparation of such wide-ranging amendments was clearly inappropriate for the depth of the amendments considering their societal impact. This speed resulted in a lack of time for a proper period of consultation with civil society prior to the adoption of the amendments by parliament. As a Constitutional Assembly of Russia was not convened, the Constitution was adopted after it was voted by Parliament and by the subjects of the Federation. Following these steps, the amendments had to enter into force under Article 135 of the Constitution. A negative outcome of the additional steps which were introduced ad hoc, i.e. the review by the Constitutional Court and the all-Russian vote, could not have prevented the entry into force of the amendments. It follows that the introduction of these additional steps in the procedure used to amend the Constitution created an obvious tension with Article 16 of the Constitution which safeguards "the fundamental principles of the constitutional order of the Russian Federation".

== See also ==
- Russia under Vladimir Putin
