= Ural State Law University =

Public research university in Russia

Coordinates: 56.8498°N 60.6567°E

V. F. Yakovlev Ural State Law University (USLU)
- Уральский государственный юридический университет имени В. Ф. Яковлева (УрГЮУ)
- Former names: Siberian Institute of Soviet Law (1931—1934); Sverdlovsk Law Institute (1935—1954, 1962—1981); A. Y. Vyshinsky Sverdlovsk Law Institute (1954—1962); R. A. Rudenko Sverdlovsk Law Institute (1981—1992); Ural State Law Academy (1992—2014); Ural State Law University (2014—2022)
- Motto: Russian: Интеллект, честь, творчество Latin: Intelligentia, honorem, glossarium
- Motto in English: Intelligence, honor, creativity
- Type: Public
- Established: 1918 (as the Law Faculty of the Irkutsk State University), 1931
- Rector: Prof. Vladimir A. Bublik (since 2007)
- Academic staff: 554 (February 2022)
- Students: 8358 (February 2022)
- Location: (Russia) Yekaterinburg, Sverdlovsk Oblast, Russia
- Campus: Urban
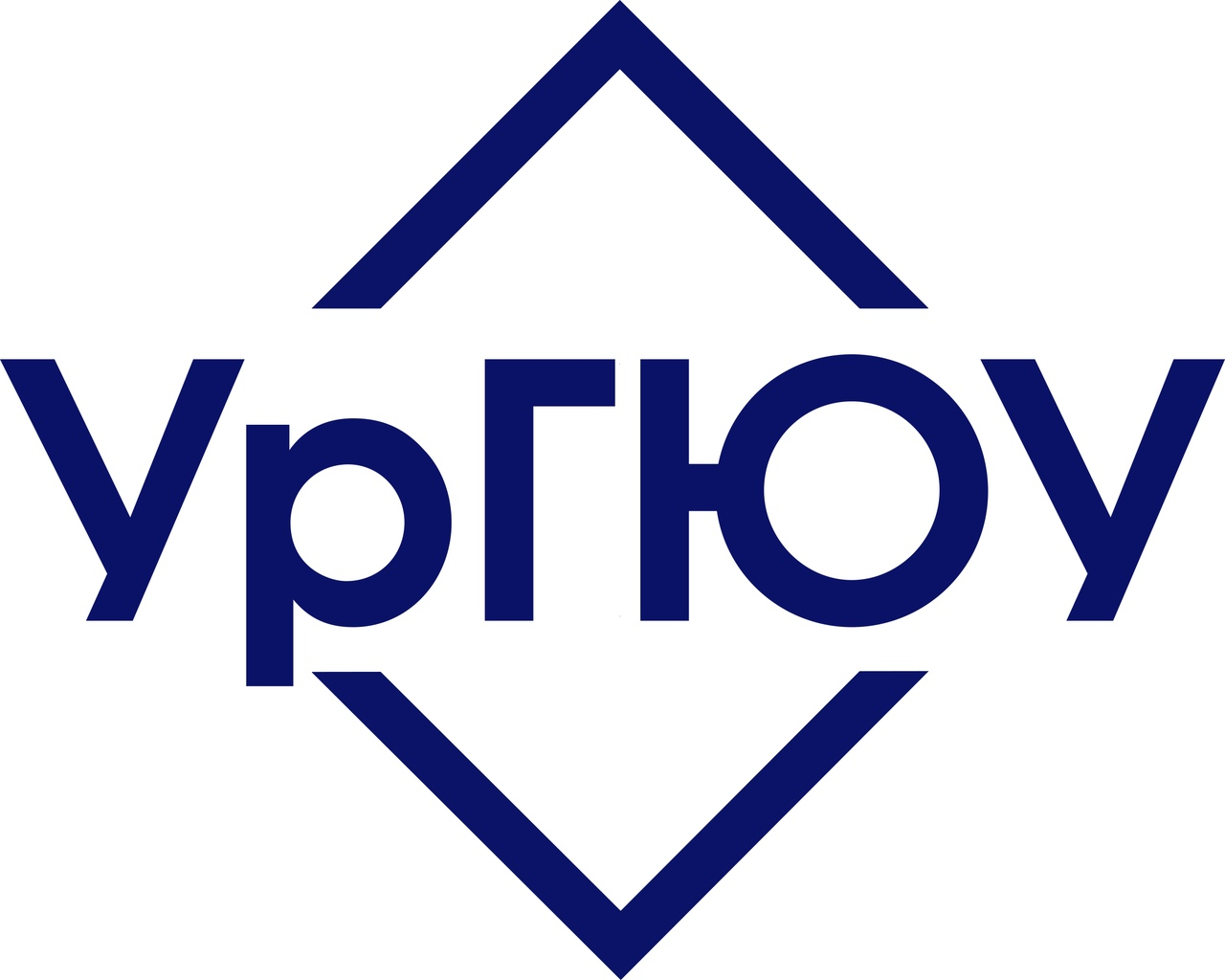

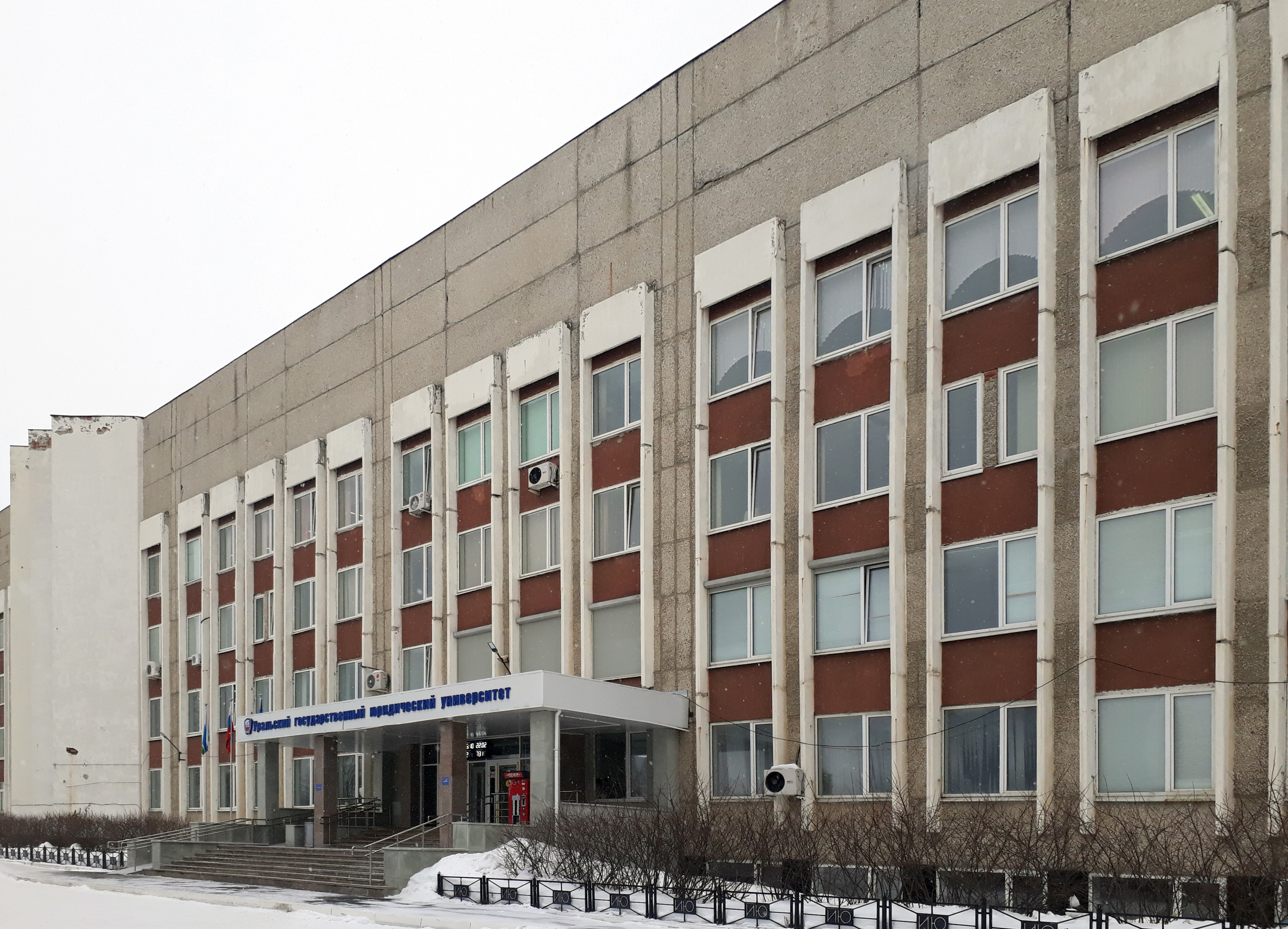
- Academic building on Kolmogorov St, 54

V. F. Yakovlev Ural State Law University (USLU, Russian: Уральский государственный юридический университет имени В. Ф. Яковлева, УрГЮУ), formerly the Ural State Law Academy (USLA, Russian: Уральская государственная юридическая академия, УрГЮА) and the Sverdlovsk Law Institute (Russian: Свердловский юридический институт, СЮИ), is a public, research university which includes law schools, colleges, faculties and other public graduate and undergraduate educational institutions. USLU's main campus is situated in the Yekaterinburg, Russia. Founded in 1918, USLU is one of the largest law schools in Russia. USLU is organized into 15 schools, colleges, and institutes, located in Yekaterinburg.

National Universities rankings ranked the academy in 5 place of the best Law schools in the Russian Federation. The Federal Agency for Scientific Research in information and telecommunication technologies of The Russian Federation ranked USLU in the 2nd position for the best law schools in Russia in 2008. In 2004 USLA was awarded by gold medal in "One hundred best universities in Russia".

== History ==
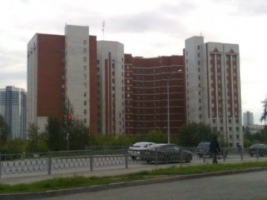
USLU's dormitory building

The Siberian Institute of Soviet Law (Russian: Сибирский институт советского права) was founded on 20 April 1931 in Irkutsk by the decision of the Government of the Soviet Union based on the Faculty of Law of Irkutsk State University. On 1 August 1934 the resolution of the Government of the Soviet Union transferred the Siberian Institute of Soviet Law from Irkutsk to Sverdlovsk. In 1935, the Siberian Institute of Soviet Law was renamed to Sverdlovsk Law Institute (Russian: Свердловский юридический институт). The institute carried the name of Procurator General of the USSR Andrey Vyshinsky from 1954 to 1962 and after Prosecutor General of the USSR Roman Rudenko from 1981 to 1992. On 24 December 1992 Sverdlovsk Law Institute was renamed to Ural State Law Academy. The academy was renamed to Ural State Law University by decree of Russian Ministry of Education and Science on April 22, 2014. On 9 February 2022 the university was named after the first President of the High Court of Arbitration of Russia Veniamin Yakovlev.

== Structure ==
=== Institutes ===
- Institute of Justice
- Institute of Business and Law
- Institute of the Prosecutor's Office
- Institute of State and International Law
- Institute of Special Educational Programs
- Institute of Additional Education
- Institute of Pre-University Training
- Department of Doctoral and Postgraduate Studies

=== Departments ===
- Department of Administrative Law
- Department of Civil Law
- Department of Civil Procedure
- Department of Constitutional Law
- Department of Corporate Law
- Department of Criminal Law
- Department of Criminalistics
- Department of Financial Law
- Department of History of State and Law
- Department of IT Law
- Department of International Law
- Department of Judicial Activity and Criminal Procedure
- Department of Labour Law
- Department of Land Law, Urban Planning Law, and Environmental Law
- Department of Legal Theory
- Department of Physical Education and Sport
- Department of Prosecutor's Activity
- Department of Russian and Foreign Languages
- Department of Social and Humanitarian Disciplines

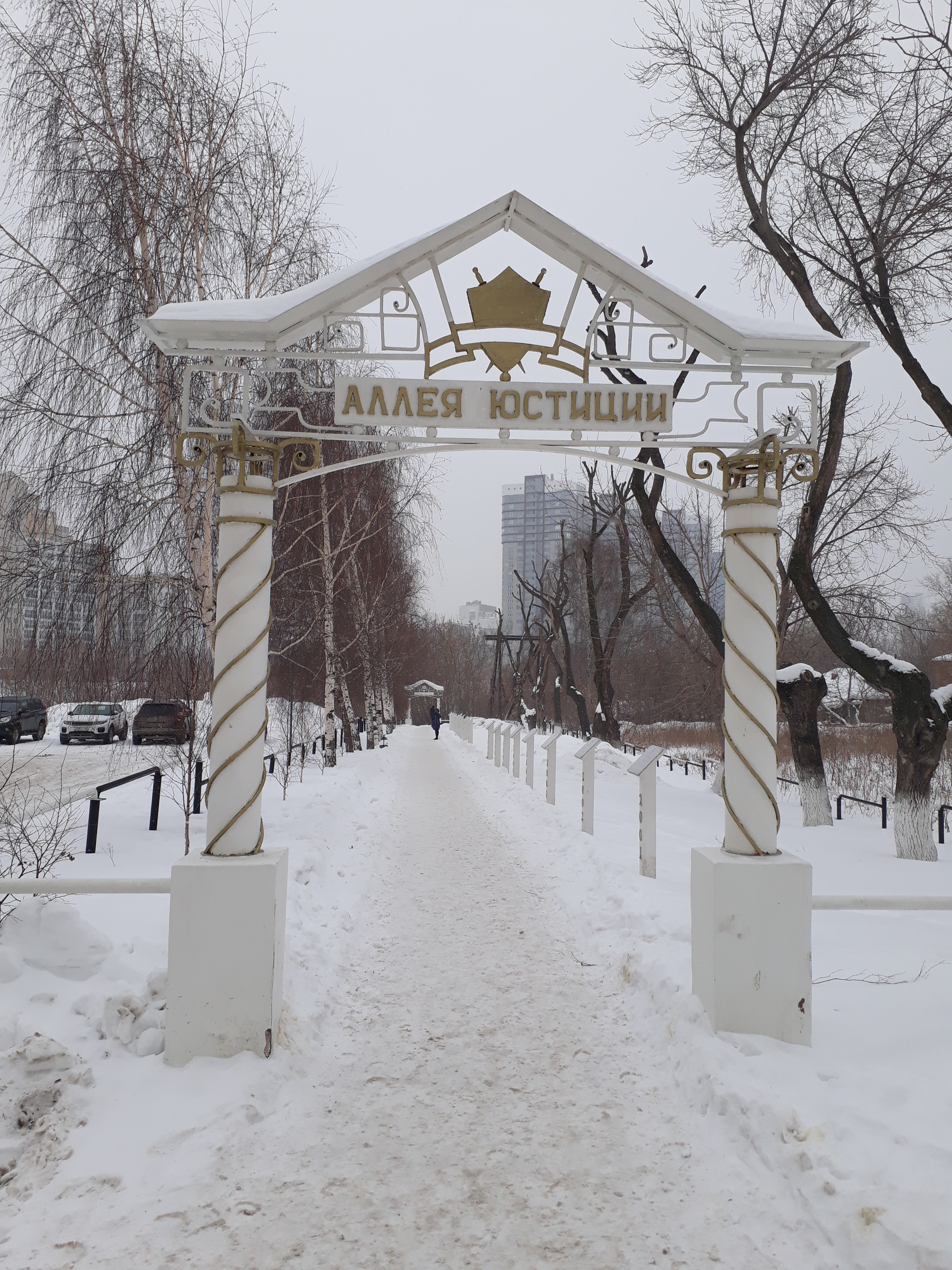
Alley of Justice

== Science ==
Since 1993, the University publishes scientific, theoretical and practical research projects of its students in cooperation with the Ministry of Justice .

== International Relations ==
USLU maintains and develops relationships with a number of leading universities in Europe and the United States.

== Alumni ==
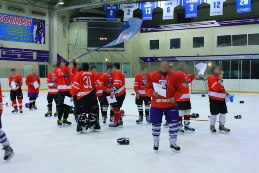
USLU's hockey team

Over the years Ural State Law University trained over 60,000 qualified professionals.

=== Famous alumni ===
- Sergei Alexeyev (1949), a Soviet and Russian legal scholar, one of the co-authors of the Constitution of Russia of 1993.
- Veniamin Yakovlev (1953), a Soviet and Russian jurist who served as the 5th Minister of Justice of the USSR from 1989 to 1990 and as the 1st President of the High Court of Arbitration of Russia from 1992 to 2005.
- Alexander Karlin (1972), a Russian politician who served as the 5th Governor of Altai Krai from 2005 to 2018.
- Gennady Zhilin (1972), a Russian legal scholar and judge who served as a judge of the Constitutional Court of Russia from 1999 to 2016.
- Yury Skuratov (1973), a Russian jurist who served as the 5th Prosecutor-General of Russia from 1995 to 2000.
- Yury Biryukov (1975), a Russian jurist who served as the First Deputy Prosecutor-General of Russia from 2000 to 2006 and the Senator from Kalmykia from 2014 to 2019.
- Yury Chaika (1976), a Russian jurist who served as the 6th Minister of Justice of Russia from 1999 to 2006 and the 7th Prosecutor-General of Russia from 2006 to 2020.
- Larisa Krasavchikova (1976), a Russian scholar of civil law who served as a judge of the Constitutional Court of Russia from 2003 to 2025.
- Sergey Trakhimenok (1977), a Belarusian writer.
- Serhii Kivalov (1980), a Ukrainian politician who served as the 4th Head of Central Election Commission of Ukraine during the 2004 Ukrainian presidential election.
- Alexander Yevstifeyev (1980), a Russian politician who served as the 4th Head of Mari El from 2017 to 2022.
- Vladislav Tumanov (1983), a Russian politician who served as the 2nd Governor of Pskov Oblast from 1992 to 1996
- Vasily Piskaryov (1984), a lawyer who served as the Deputy Head of the Investigative Committee of Russia from 2012 to 2016 and currently seves as a deputy in the 8th State Duma.
- Aleksandr Kokotov (1985), a Russian scholar of constitutional law who has served as a judge of the Constitutional Court of Russia since 2010.
- Pavel Krasheninnikov (1989), a Russian politician and jurist who served as the 5th Minister of Justice of Russia from 1998 to 1999.
- Andrey Selivanov (1995), a chess player, the World Chess Solving Champion of 2003.
- Atakhan Abilov (1999), a Talysh national minority and human rights activist from Azerbaijan.
- Yevgeny Taribo (2000), a Russian scholar of constitutional, administrative and tax law who has served as a judge of the Constitutional Court of Russia since 2025.

== Journals ==
Students at the Law School publish several legal journals:

- Lawyer
- Injust
