= State Duma =

Lower house of the Federal Assembly of Russia

Coordinates: 55°45′28″N 37°36′57″E

State Duma Государственная дума Gosudarstvennaya duma
- 9th State Duma

Type
- Type: Lower house of the Federal Assembly of Russia

History
- Established: 12 December 1993; 32 years ago
- Preceded by: Soviet of the Republic; Constitutional Conference of Russia

Leadership
- Chairman: Vyacheslav Volodin, United Russia since 5 October 2016
- First Deputy Chairmen: Irina Yarovaya, United Russia since 30 September 2026
- Ivan Melnikov, CPRF since 21 December 2011

Structure
- Seats: 450
- Political groups: Government (374) United Russia (350) (Note: United Russia (349) Independent (1)) Liberal Democratic (24) (Note: Liberal Democratic Party (23) Independent (1)) Other parties (76) Communist (37) New People (20) (Note: New People (19) Independent (1)) A Just Russia (17) Rodina (1) Independent (1)
- Length of term: 5 years

Elections
- Voting system: Parallel voting: 225 seats are elected by Party-list proportional representation with 5% electoral threshold; 225 seats are elected by First-past-the-post
- First election: 12 December 1993
- Last election: 18–20 September 2026
- Next election: September 2031 or earlier

Meeting place
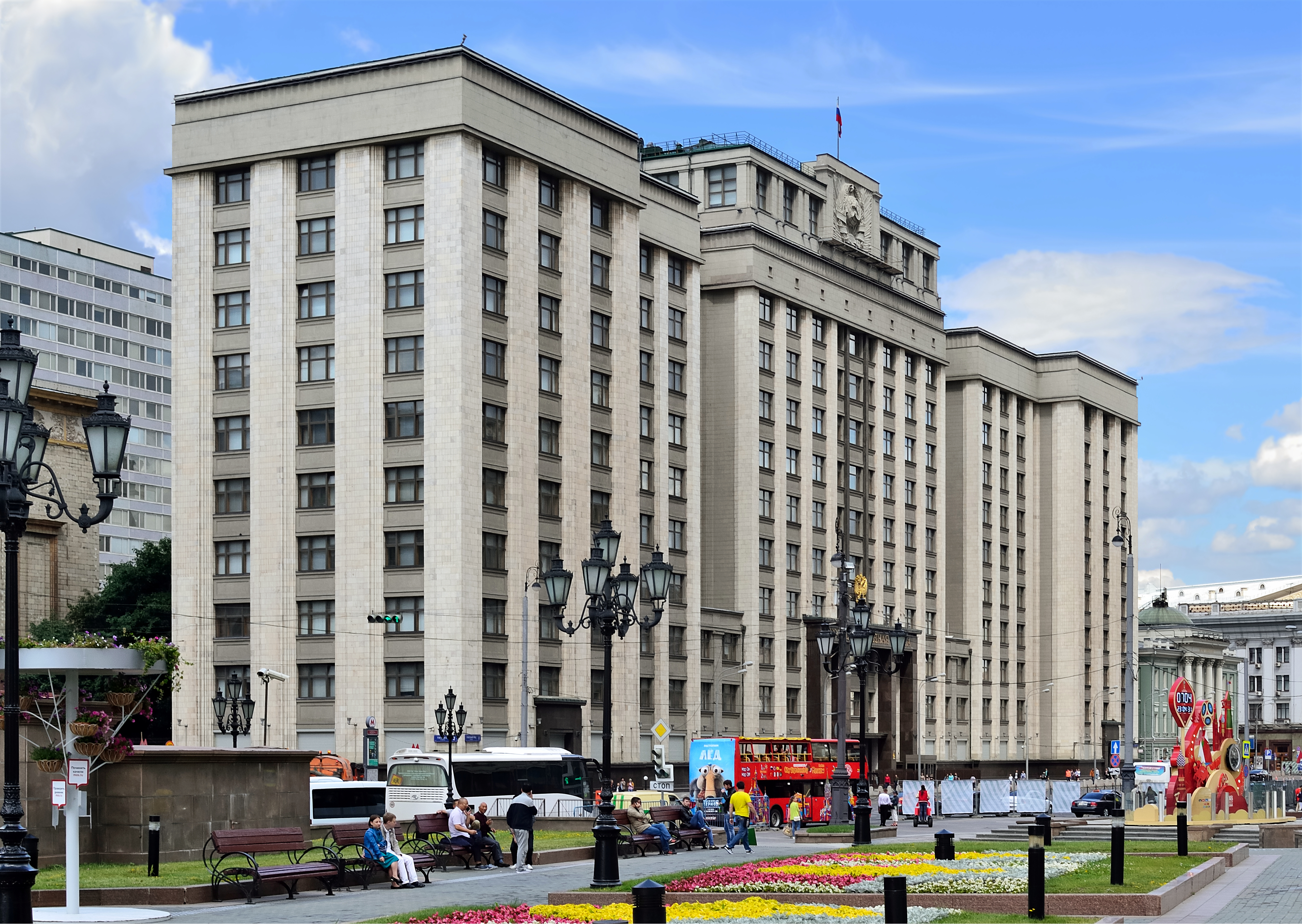
- State Duma building 1 Okhotny Ryad Street, Moscow

Website
- duma.gov.ru/en/

The State Duma (Note: /duːmə/ DOO-mə; Russian: Государственная дума, romanized: Gosudarstvennaya duma, commonly abbreviated to Госдума, Gosduma) is the lower house of the Federal Assembly of Russia, with the upper house being the Federation Council. It was established by the Constitution of the Russian Federation in 1993.

The Duma headquarters are located in central Moscow, a few steps from Manege Square. Its members are referred to as deputies. The State Duma replaced the Supreme Soviet as a result of the new constitution introduced by Boris Yeltsin in the aftermath of the Russian constitutional crisis of 1993, and approved in a nationwide referendum.

In the 2007 and 2011 Russian legislative elections, a full party-list proportional representation with 7% electoral threshold system was used, but this was subsequently repealed. The legislature's term length was initially 2 years in the 1993–1995 elections period, and 4 years in 1999–2007 elections period; since the 2011 elections the term length is 5 years.

== History ==
=== Early history ===
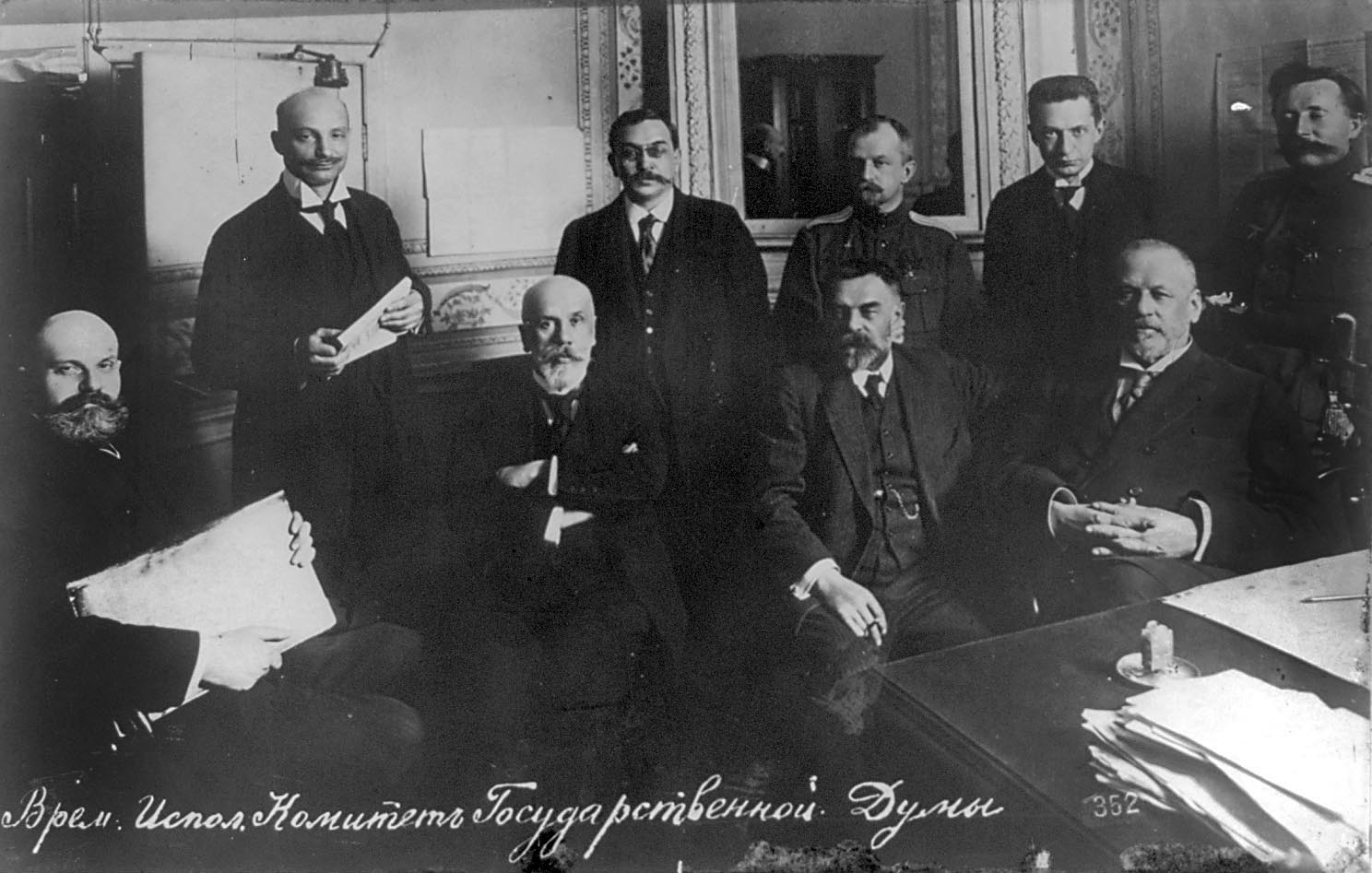
Nine members of the Provisional Committee of the State Duma in March 1917. From left to right: Seated: V. N. Lvov, V. A. Rzhevsky, S. I. Shidlovsky, and M. V. Rodzianko (Chairman); Standing: V. V. Shulgin, B. A. Engelhardt, A. F. Kerensky, and M. A. Karaulov.

The history of the duma dates back to the boyar dumas of Kievan Rus' and Muscovite Russia, as well Tsarist Russia. The State Duma of the Russian Empire was founded in 1905 after the violence and upheaval in the Russian Revolution of 1905, and was Russia's first elected parliament. The first two attempts by Tsar Nicholas II (1868–1918) to make it active were ineffective. Subsequently, each of these Dumas was dissolved after only a few months. The third Duma was the only one to last until the end of its five-year term.

After the 1907 electoral reform, the third Duma, elected in November 1907, was largely made up of members of the upper classes, as radical influences in the Duma had almost entirely been removed. The establishment of the Duma after the 1905 Revolution was to herald significant changes to the previous Russian Imperial autocratic system. Furthermore, the Duma was later to have an important effect on Russian history, as it was one of the contributing factors in the February Revolution of 1917, the first of two that year, which led to the abolition of the Tsarist autocracy in Russia and the overthrow of the Tsardom.

=== Recent history ===
==== 1990s ====
Following the dissolution of the Soviet Union and the 1993 Russian constitutional crisis, the Soviet system of government was abolished and a new Constitution was introduced and approved by a referendum. The new Charter transformed the Russian Federation into a federal semi-presidential republic, with a bicameral parliament composed by the State Duma and the Federation Council.

In the December 1993 elections pro-Yeltsin parties won 175 seats in the Duma, while the left bloc won 125 seats. The balance of power lay with the sixty-four deputies of the ultranationalist Liberal Democratic Party of Russia. Only parties that won more than five percent of the vote were given party-list seats: eight passed the threshold in 1993. In addition to those eight parties, a pool of thirty-five deputies was entitled to form a registered group to reflect regional or sectoral interests. Business was governed by a steering committee, the Duma Council, consisting of one person from each party or group. The most important task was dividing up the chair positions in the Duma's twenty-three committees, which was done as part of a power-sharing "package" deal.

Despite the fact that the Russian Constitution states that the State Duma is elected for four years, it was decided to elect the first State Duma for two years. The 1995 election resulted in a strong boost for the Communist Party of the Russian Federation, which became the first political party of Russia and elected 157 seats: a Communist, Gennady Seleznyov, was elected as Speaker of the State Duma. The "presidential party" Our Home – Russia won 55 seats.

During the second half of the 1990s, the State Duma became an important forum for lobbying by regional leaders and businessmen looking for tax breaks and legislative favors. The work of the leading committees, such as those for defense, foreign affairs, or budget, attracted a good deal of media attention and lobbying activity.

==== 2000s ====
In the early 2000s, following the 1999 parliamentary elections, the pro-presidential Unity party and the Communist Party were the leading forces in the State Duma.

After the 2003 elections, a dominant-party system was established with the newly formed pro-presidential United Russia party dominating. In all subsequent elections, United Russia has always received an absolute majority of seats (more than 226). During the presidency of Vladimir Putin, the State Duma became increasingly referred to as a rubber stamp, with there being a shift to electoral authoritarianism.

After the 2007 elections, a four-party system was formed with a United Russia, Communist Party, Liberal Democratic Party and A Just Russia. Other parties could not get enough votes to go to the State Duma. Only in 2016 elections, two other parties, Rodina and the Civic Platform, were able to get one seat.

In 2008, after the adoption of amendments to the Constitution, the term of the State Duma was increased from four to five years.

==== 2010s ====
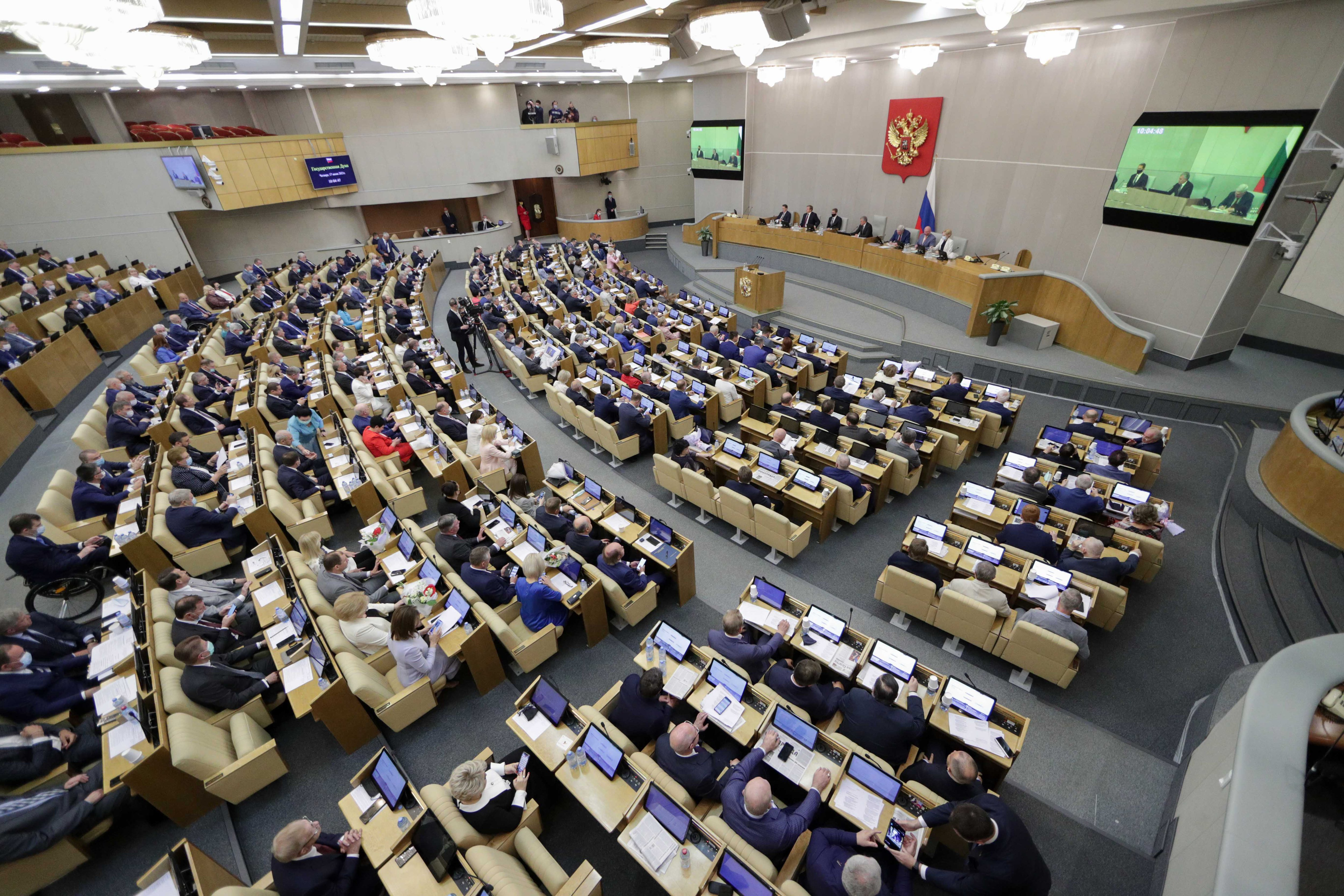
7th State Duma

A 2016 exposé by Dissernet showed that one in nine members of the State Duma had obtained academic degrees with theses that were substantially plagiarized and likely ghostwritten.

In 2018, it became known that the State Duma building would be reconstructed. Repairs began in May 2019 and ended in September 2020. During this period, the State Duma was temporarily housed in the House of Unions. In addition, a draft of a new conference room, which would be an amphitheatre, was presented.

==== 2020s ====
After the 2021 elections, in addition to the four main parties, the New People party was also elected to the State Duma. Thus, for the first time since 1999, a five-party State Duma was formed.

== Powers of the State Duma ==
The State Duma has special powers enumerated by the Constitution of Russia. They are:

- Consent to the appointment of the Prime Minister of Russia.
- Hearing annual reports from the Government of the Russian Federation on the results of its work, including on issues raised by the State Duma.
- Deciding the issue of confidence in the Government of the Russian Federation.
- Appointment and dismissal of the Chairman of the Central Bank of Russia.
- Appointment and dismissal of the Chairman and half of the auditors of the Accounts Chamber.
- Appointment and dismissal of the Commissioner for Human rights, who shall act according to federal constitutional law.
- Announcement of amnesty.
- Bringing charges against the President of the Russian Federation for his impeachment (requires a two-thirds majority).

The State Duma adopts decrees on issues relating to its authority by the Constitution of the Russian Federation.

== Election ==
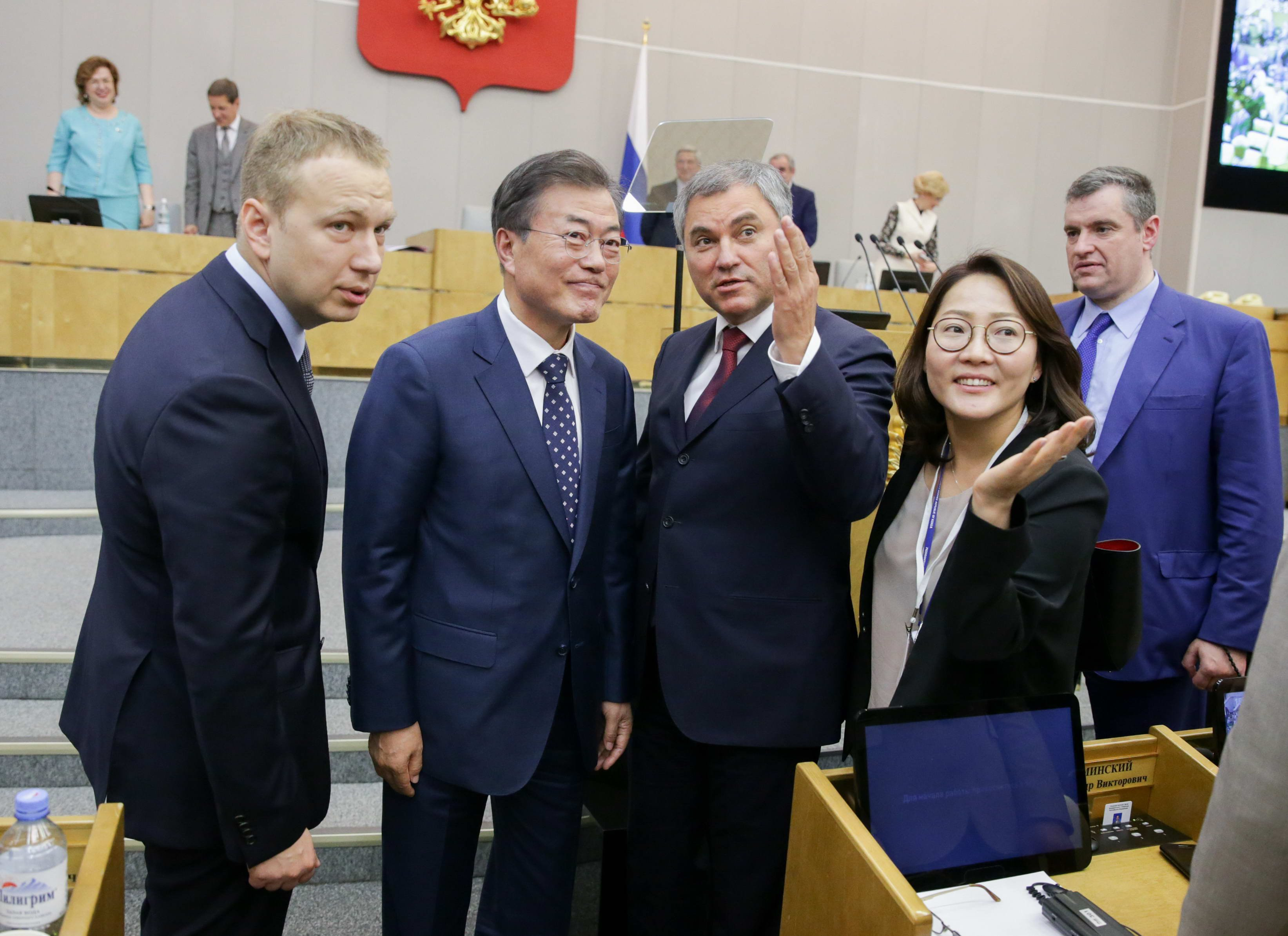
Vyacheslav Volodin with South Korean President Moon Jae-in in the State Duma, 21 June 2018

The legal framework that is used to elect Duma differed over the years. Except for parliamentary election of 2007 and election of 2011, the mixed system of parallel voting was used to elect Duma. The system was restored back in February 2014 from a party-list proportional representation system enacted in 2003 with an increased threshold of 7% which was lowered this time to 5%.

=== Constituencies ===
According to the law adopted in 2014 the Russian territory is divided into constituencies which are used for elections of single candidates per constituency. However, a single "united" constituency is used for the distribution of party-list.

== Procedures ==
=== Bills and laws ===
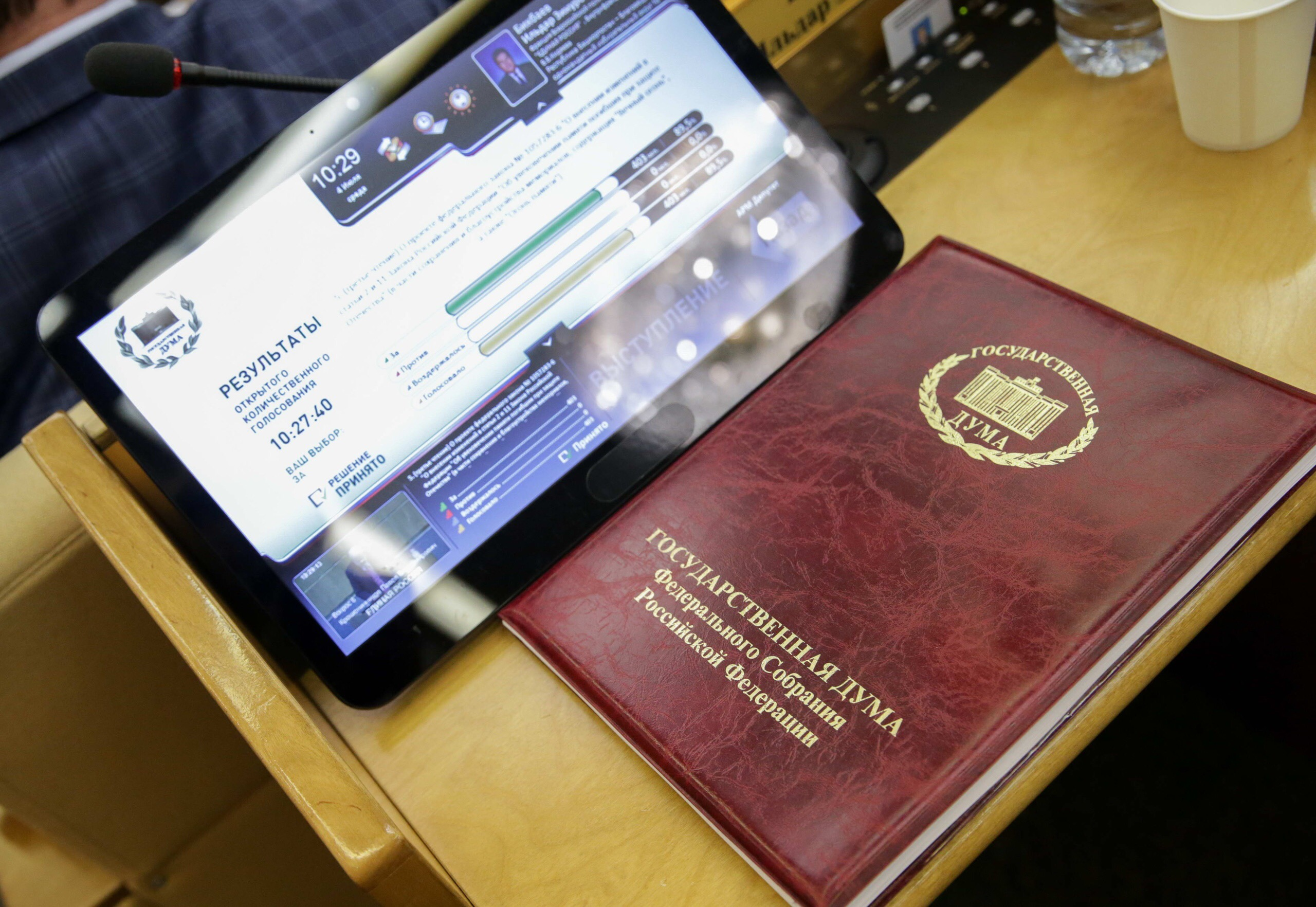
Voting device

Bills of the State Duma are adopted by a majority of the total number of deputies of the State Duma, unless another procedure is envisaged by the Constitution. All bills are first approved by the State Duma and are further debated and approved (or rejected) by the Federation Council.

Relatively few roll call votes have been published that identify individual deputies' votes. The votes of individuals are recorded only if the voting is open and the electronic method is used. While not all votes are officially roll call votes, every time a deputy electronically votes a computer registers the individual deputy's vote.

== Membership ==
Any citizen of the Russian Federation aged 21 or older who has the right to participate in elections may be elected as a deputy to the State Duma. However, that same person may not be a deputy to the Federation Council. In addition, a State Duma deputy cannot hold office in any other representative body of state power or bodies of local self-government. The office as deputy of the State Duma is a full-time and professional position. Thus, deputies to the State Duma may not be employed in the civil service or engage in any activities for remuneration other than teaching, research or other creative activities.

=== Chairmen of the State Duma ===
- Ivan Rybkin (1994–1996)
- Gennadiy Seleznyov (1996–2003)
- Boris Gryzlov (2003–2011)
- Sergey Naryshkin (2011–2016)
- Vyacheslav Volodin (since 2016)

== List of State Duma convocations ==
Duma	Period	Election
1st	12 December 1993 – 17 December 1995	1993
2nd	17 December 1995 – 19 December 1999	1995
3rd	19 December 1999 – 7 December 2003	1999
4th	7 December 2003 – 2 December 2007	2003
5th	2 December 2007 – 4 December 2011	2007
6th	21 December 2011 – 18 September 2016	2011
7th	5 October 2016 – 19 September 2021	2016
8th	12 October 2021 – 30 September 2026	2021
9th	30 September 2026 – present	2026

== Historical composition ==
KPRF / GS / Yabloko / OVR / ZhR / Others / Indep. / Vacant / RDDR / NPRF / NDR / SPS / DVR / DPR / PRES / APR / VN / Unity / LDPR / KRO
1993	42 / 10 / 27 / 23 / 6 / 130 / 5 / 64 / 14 / 22 / 37 / 64
1995	157 / 45 / 3 / 18 / 77 / 55 / 9 / 1 / 20 / 9 / 51 / 5
1999	113 / 20 / 68 / 9 / 105 / 9 / 7 / 29 / 73 / 17

KPRF / SR / Yabloko / Others / Indep. / Vacant / NPRF / NL / SPS / APR / ER / LDPR / Rodina
2003	52 / 4 / 6 / 67 / 3 / 17 / 3 / 2 / 223 / 36 / 37
2007	57 / 38 / 315 / 40
2011	92 / 64 / 238 / 56
2016	42 / 23 / 1 / 1 / 343 / 39 / 1
2021	57 / 27 / 2 / 5 / 13 / 324 / 21 / 1
2026	37 / 17 / 4 / 19 / 349 / 23 / 1

== Latest election ==
United Russia easily triumphed in the elections, gaining more than three fourths of the seats in the State Duma. Several parties representing Russia's systemic opposition filled in the remainder of the seats, and a handful went to members without any party affiliation. Overall turnout was at 55.66%, with Moscow seeing a record high voter turnout according to the commission. Observers noted that in the absence of serious opposition parties, it was more of a question of how much rather than if United Russia would win. Some have stated that this will either lead to more drastic legislation being passed or Vladimir Putin using the legislature as a cover more often. Putin himself stated that the results indicated that the Russian people stood firmly behind the war in Ukraine. Ella Pamfilova, chairman of the Central Election Commission said that for the first time, veterans of the Russo-Ukrainian War who ran in the election won 46 to 49 seats.

Party	Party-list			Constituency			Total seats	+/–
Party	Votes	%	Seats	Votes	%	Seats	Total seats	+/–
United Russia	39,118,497	59.01	140			209	349	+25
Communist Party	9,051,776	13.66	32			5	37	–20
Liberal Democratic Party	5,970,578	9.01	21			2	23	+2
New People	5,253,202	7.92	19			0	19	+6
A Just Russia	3,589,806	5.42	13			4	17	–10
Party of Pensioners	1,286,329	1.94	0			0	0	0
The Greens	761,542	1.15	0			0	0	0
Communists of Russia	555,943	0.84	0			0	0	0
Rodina	469,972	0.71	0			1	1	0
Party of Direct Democracy	231,011	0.35	0			0	0	New
Yabloko						0	0	0
Independents						4	4	–1
Total	66,288,656	100.00	225			225	450	0
Valid votes	66,288,656	98.64						
Invalid/blank votes	913,571	1.36						
Total votes	67,202,227	100.00						
Registered voters/turnout	112,789,817	59.58		112,789,817	–			
Source: Central Election Commission of the Russian Federation

== See also ==
- Committee on International Affairs of the State Duma
- List of members of the State Duma of Russia who died in office
