= Larisa Krasavchikova =

Judge of the Russian Constitutional Court from 2003 to 2025

- Лариса Красавчикова
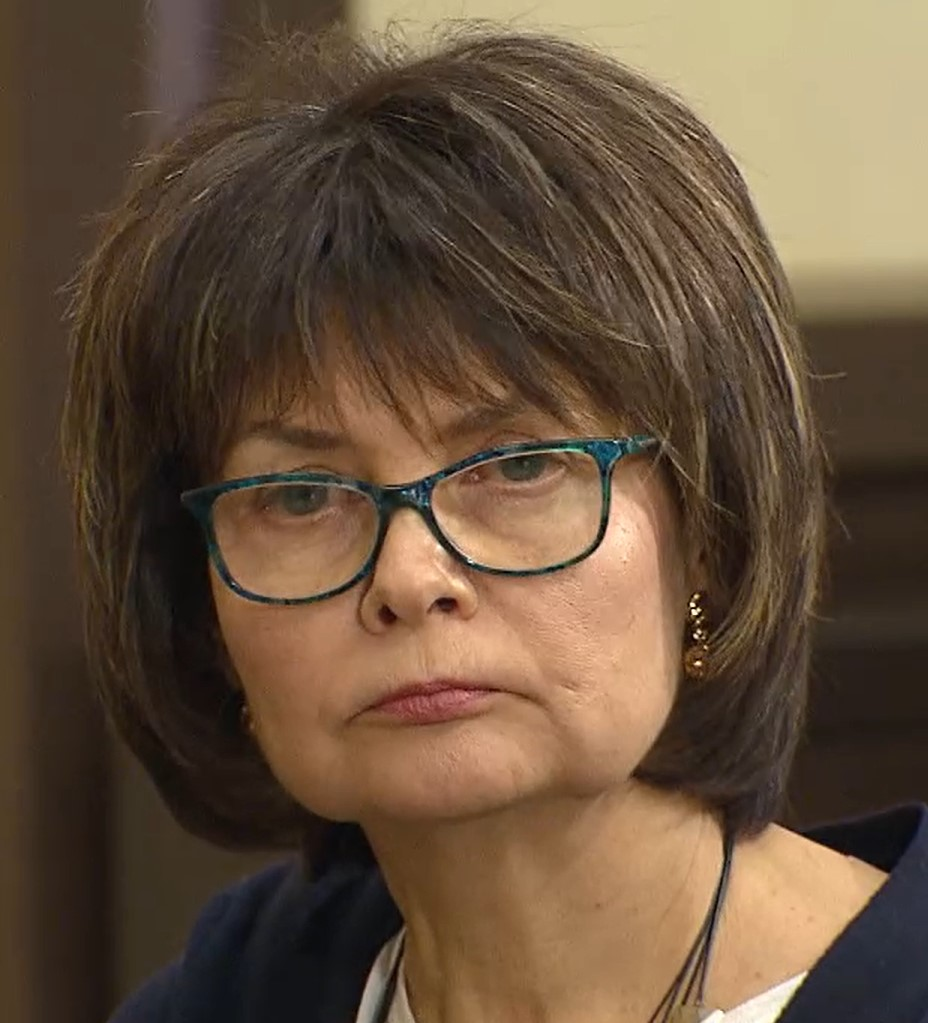

Judge of the Constitutional Court of Russia
- In office 12 February 2003 – 31 March 2025
- Nominated by: Vladimir Putin

Personal details
- Born: Larisa Oktyabrievna Krasavchikova; 21 March 1955 (age 71) Sverdlovsk, Soviet Union
- Education: Sverdlovsk Law Institute
- Occupation: Judge, academic
- Awards: Order of Honour; Order of Friendship; Honoured Lawyer of Russia; Russian Federation Presidential Certificate of Honour

Larisa Oktyabrievna Krasavchikova (Russian: Лариса Октябриевна Красавчикова; born 21 March 1955) is a Russian jurist and civil law scholar who served as the judge of the Constitutional Court of Russia from 2003 to 2025.

== Biography ==
Larisa Krasavchikova was born on March 21, 1955, in Sverdlovsk (now Yekaterinburg) into the family of a prominent Soviet legal scholar Oktyabr Krasavchikov.

In 1976, after graduating from the Sverdlovsk Law Institute (now Ural State Law University), she enrolled in its postgraduate program. In 1979, under the supervision of Professor Veniamin Yakovlev (future President of the High Court of Arbitration of Russia), she defended her Candidate of Sciences (Ph.D. equivalent) thesis on "Civil Law Protection of the Private Life of Soviet Citizens". After completing her thesis, she joined the Department of Civil Law at the Sverdlovsk Law Institute, first as an instructor and later as an associate professor.

In 1994, she earned her Doctor of Sciences (habilitation) degree with a thesis titled "The Concept and System of Personal Non-Property Rights of Natural Persons in the Russia's Civil Law". In 1998, she was awarded the academic title of Professor.

In February 2003, the Federation Council appointed Krasavchikova a judge of the Russian Constitutional Court upon a nomination by President Vladimir Putin.

She taught at the Department of Legal Support for the Market Economy at the Russian Presidential Academy of Public Administration.

In December 2022, amid Russia's invasion of Ukraine, Krasavchikova was added to the European Union sanctions list for "artificially creating the image of the legitimacy of Russia's invasion of Ukraine". She had previously been included in Ukraine's sanctions list.
