= Constitutional Conference of Russia =

1993 Russian constituent assembly

Constitutional Conference of the Russian Federation Конституционное совещание Российской Федерации
- Russia

Type
- Type: Constituent assembly

History
- Established: June 1992 By decree of the president of Russia
- Disbanded: 12 December 1993
- Preceded by: Supreme Soviet of Russia; Congress of People's Deputies of Russia
- Succeeded by: Federal Assembly of Russia
- Seats: Over 800

The Constitutional Conference of the Russian Federation (Russian: Конституционное совещание Российской Федерации) was a consultative body of representatives of government bodies, local authorities and public organizations, convened by the order of the Russian president Boris Yeltsin in 1993 to complete the preparation of an alternative draft of Constitution of the Russian Federation.

The reason for dissatisfaction was the convocation of the president of the draft constitution drafted by the Constitutional Commission of the Congress of People's Deputies. It was opened in Moscow in the Kremlin June 5, 1993 on the basis of Presidential Decree "On the order of the Constitutional Council" of 2 June 1993 number 840. The first phase of the signing of the Constitutional Council by the meeting July 12, 1993 finalized and agreed on it the draft Constitution.

Presidential draft Constitution was created under the auspices of the three, Sergey Alekseev, Anatoly Sobchak and Sergey Shakhray, they were the leaders of the process, but only a Constitutional Conference was attended by over 800 participants, working different lawyers. By working together, produced a new single draft Constitution, which was subsequently submitted by the president of the Russian Federation on the referendum, and became the current Constitution of the Russian Federation as a result of a vote held December 12, 1993.

Initially, the Constitutional meeting included representatives of five groups:

- federal authorities
- bodies of state power of subjects of the Russian Federation
- local self-government
- political parties
- trade unions
- youth and other civil society organizations, mass movements, and religious denominations, producers and entrepreneurs.

In October–November 1993 "presidential" draft Constitution was the finalization of the newly created bodies of the Constitutional Council: Public and State wards, as well as the Commission's constitutional arbitration Constitutional Council. The result of the meeting was the introduction of the Constitutional many (several hundred) of amendments to the original "presidential" draft constitution, which has incorporated certain provisions of the draft Constitutional Commission of the Congress of People's Deputies.

As the Constitution draft was ready, it was submitted to a referendum by the president of the Russian Federation December 12, 1993.
