= Constitution of Russia =

Constitution of the Russian Federation
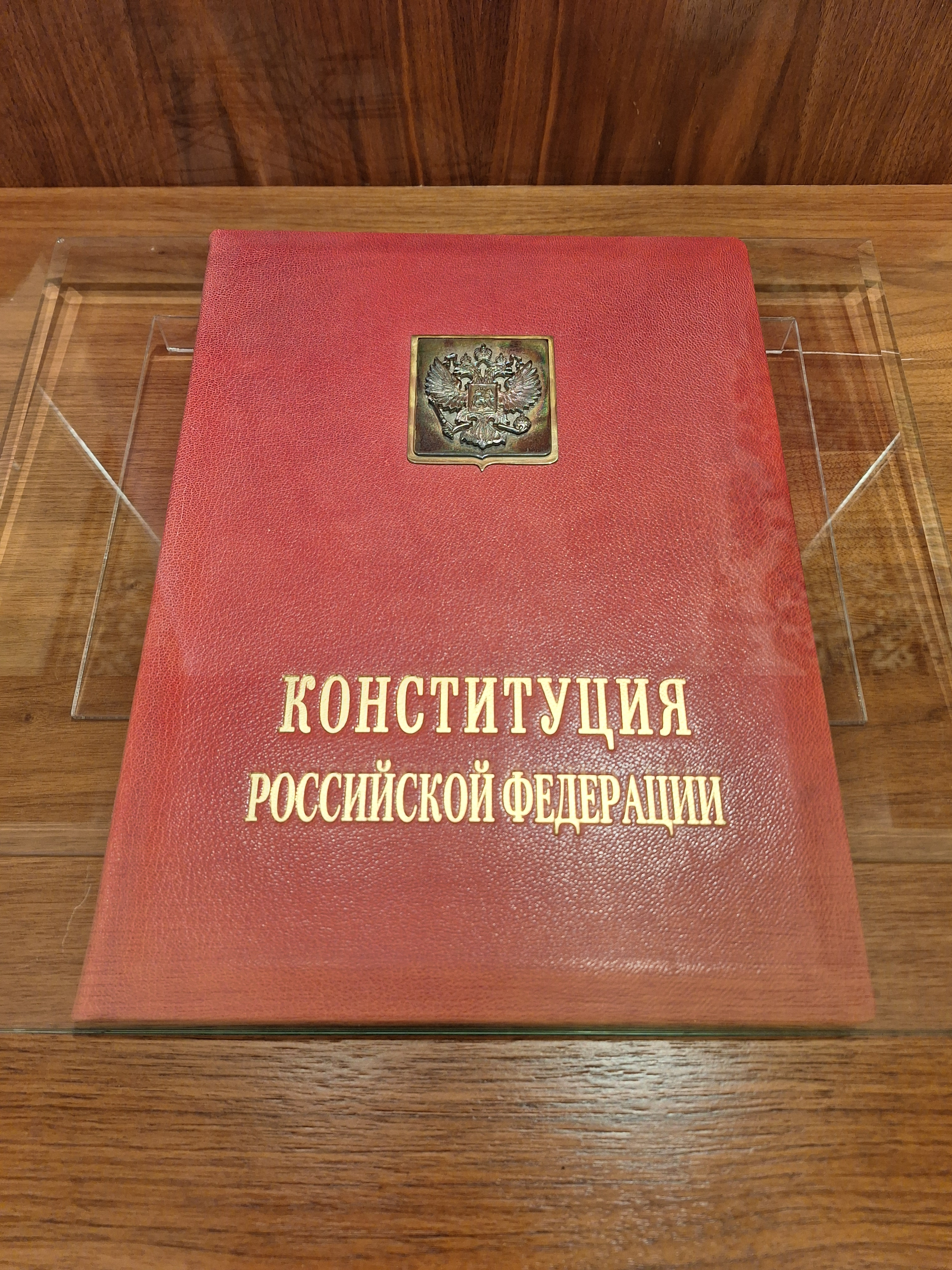
- A special copy of the text of the Constitution of the Russian Federation, on which the President of the Russian Federation takes the oath

Overview
- Original title: Конституция Российской Федерации
- Jurisdiction: Russian Federation
- Ratified: 12 December 1993
- Date effective: 25 December 1993
- System: Federal semi-presidential republic

Government structure
- Branches: Three
- Head of state: President
- Chambers: Bicameral (Federal Assembly: Federation Council, State Duma)
- Executive: Prime Minister-led Government
- Judiciary: Judiciary (Constitutional Court, Supreme Court)
- Federalism: Federation
- Electoral college: No
- Entrenchments: 9

History
- First legislature: 12 December 1993
- First executive: 9 August 1996
- Amendments: 4 (plus 11 alternations on Federal subjects)
- Last amended: 4 July 2020
- Location: Kremlin, Moscow
- Commissioned by: Constitutional Conference
- Signatories: Constitutional referendum by the citizens of Russia
- Supersedes: Constitution of the RSFSR

Full text
- Constitution of Russia at Wikisource

The Constitution of the Russian Federation (Russian: Конституция Российской Федерации, romanized: Konstitutsiya Rossiyskoy Federatsii) was adopted by national referendum on 12 December 1993 and enacted on 25 December 1993. The latest significant reform occurred in 2020, marked by extensive amendments that altered various sections, including those relating to presidential terms, social policies, and the primacy of Russian law over international law (see 2020 amendments to the Constitution of Russia).

Russia's constitution came into force on 25 December 1993, at the moment of its official publication, and abolished the Soviet system of government. The 1993 Constitution is one of the longest-standing constitutions in Russian history, second only to the Soviet-era 1937 Constitution, which remained in effect until 1978.

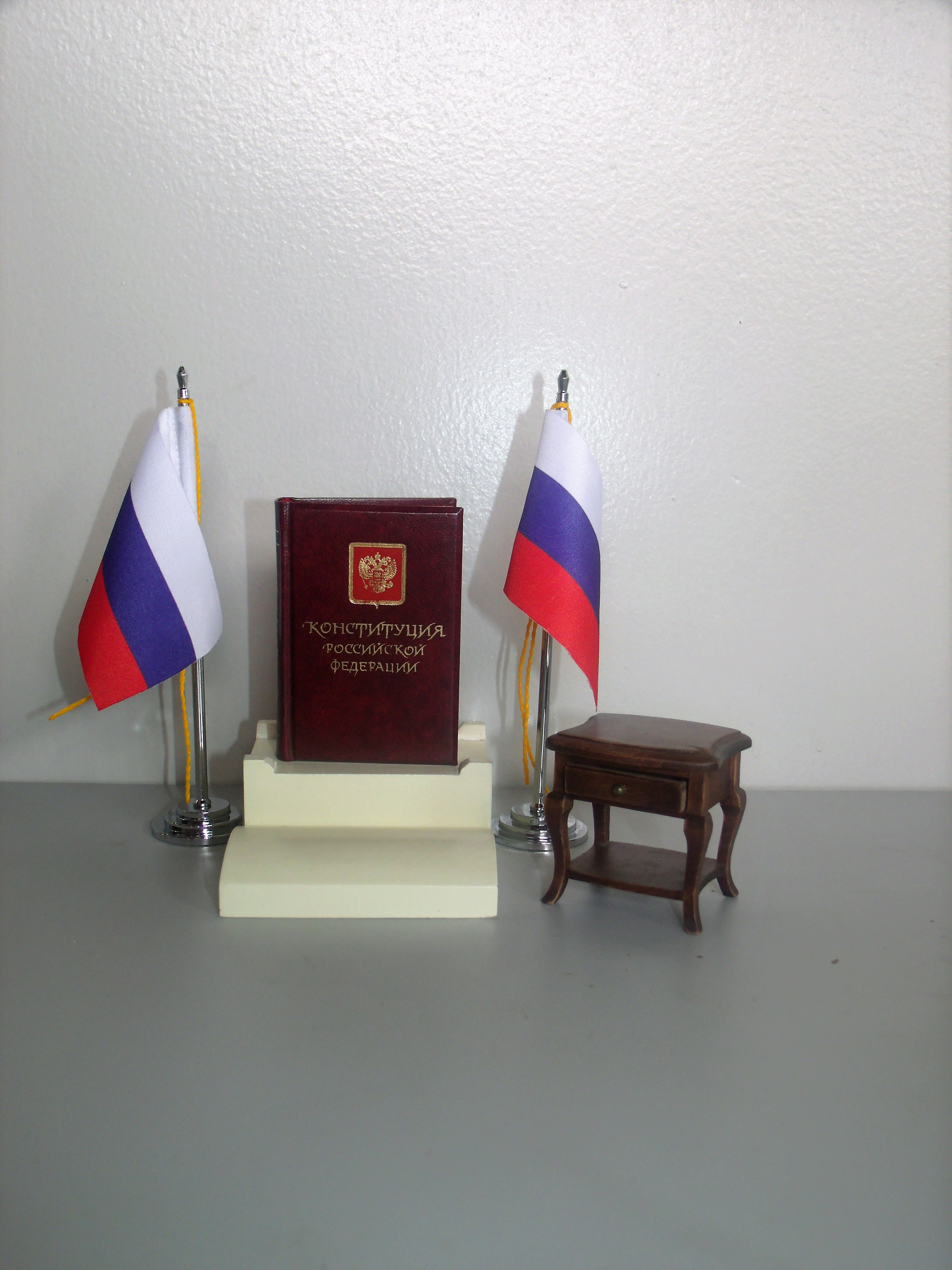
In miniature book version.

The text was drafted by the 1993 Constitutional Conference, which was attended by over 800 participants. Sergei Alexeyev, Sergey Shakhray, and sometimes Anatoly Sobchak are considered the primary co-authors of the constitution. The text was inspired by Mikhail Speransky's constitutional project and the current French constitution. Lawyers funded by USAID also contributed to the development of the draft.

It replaced the previous Soviet-era Constitution of 12 April 1978 of the Russian Soviet Federative Socialist Republic, which had already been amended in April 1992 to reflect the dissolution of the Soviet Union and the sovereignty of the Russian Federation, following the 1993 Russian constitutional crisis.

== Structure ==
The constitution is divided into two sections. Overall, it creates a system of crown-presidentialism (see Partlett 2022 for details), which affords vast power to the office of the president to dominate the executive, legislative, and judicial branches of government.

=== Preamble ===
"We, the multinational people of the Russian Federation, united by a common fate on our land, establishing human rights and freedoms, civic peace and accord, preserving the historically established state unity, proceeding from the universally recognised principles of equality and self-determination of peoples, revering the memory of ancestors who have conveyed to us love for the Fatherland, belief in good and justice, reviving the sovereign statehood of Russia and asserting the firmness of its democratic foundation, striving to ensure the well-being and prosperity of Russia, proceeding from responsibility for our Fatherland before present and future generations, recognising ourselves as part of the world community, adopt the Constitution of the Russian Federation."

=== Section One ===
1. The Basis of the Constitutional System (Russian: Основы конституционного строя)
2. Human and Civil Rights and Freedoms (Russian: Права и свободы человека и гражданина)
3. The Federal Structure (Russian: Федеративное устройство)
4. The President of the Russian Federation (Russian: Президент Российской Федерации)
5. The Federal Assembly (Russian: Федеральное Собрание)
6. The Government of the Russian Federation (Russian: Правительство Российской Федерации)
7. Judicial Power and the Public Prosecution Service (Russian: Судебная власть и прокуратура)
8. Local Self-Government (Russian: Местное самоуправление)
9. Constitutional Amendments and Revision of the Constitution (Russian: Конституционные поправки и пересмотр Конституции)

=== Section Two ===
1. Concluding and Transitional Provisions (Russian: Заключительные и переходные положения)

== Provisions ==
With particular regard to human rights and fundamental freedoms, the Constitution provides for the human rights and freedoms of citizens in accordance with the universally recognised principles and norms of international law, as well as with the listing of such rights and freedoms in the Constitution. (It affirms that the enumeration in the Constitution of the Russian Federation of fundamental rights and freedoms shall not be interpreted as a rejection or derogation of any other universally recognised human rights and freedoms.)

=== Executive ===
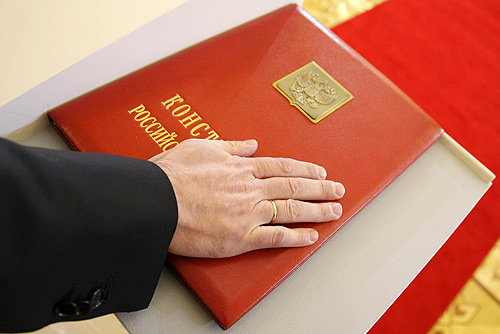
Dmitry Medvedev takes the presidential oath with his right hand resting on the Constitution, 7 May 2008.

The Constitution of the Russian Federation specifies that the President is the Russian head of state, setting domestic and foreign policy and representing Russia both within the country and internationally (Article 80). While the original constitution stipulated a four-year term and a maximum of two terms in succession, the current constitution decrees a six-year term. The four-year term was in effect while Vladimir Putin served his first and second terms; with the two-term limit, he was barred from the presidency in 2008. Instead, he served as Prime Minister while Dmitry Medvedev served as president for four years. Putin was re-elected to his third term in 2012; with the six-year term having been introduced, he was elected to his fourth term in 2018. Article 81 specifies the method of election, including a secret ballot; Articles 82–93 detail the powers, responsibilities, and limitations of the presidency. The constitution provides for a 'strong presidency'; not only is the president the 'Supreme Commander-in-Chief of the Armed Forces of the Russian Federation', but the president also has the power to dissolve the State Duma.

=== Legislative branch ===
The legislature is the Federal Assembly of Russia, which consists of two chambers: the State Duma (the lower house) and the Federation Council (the upper house). The two chambers have different powers and responsibilities: the State Duma is the more significant of the two, as it carries the main responsibility for passing federal laws. Although a bill may originate in either chamber (or be submitted by the President, the government, local legislatures, or the Supreme, Constitutional, or High Arbitration Courts), it must first be considered by the State Duma and adopted by a majority vote before being passed to the Federation Council, which has 14 days to take a vote on it. If the bill is adopted by the Federation Council, it must be signed by the President to become law. If it is rejected by the Federation Council, the bill is returned to the State Duma, which can then override the Council's rejection by passing it again, in the same form, with a two-thirds majority. The President has a final veto, but the State Duma and the Federation Council also have the power to override it by passing the bill with a two-thirds majority.

=== Judiciary ===
While the Russian Federation Constitution enumerates a strong and independent judicial branch, the reality of this is a matter of debate. The constitution provides for judicial immunity, lifetime appointments (or 'irremovable' justices), the supremacy of the courts in administering justice, and affirms that judges need only submit to the constitution and federal law. Additionally, Article 123 provides for open and fair trials, as well as equal application of the law. The Constitution originally delineated three main courts: the Constitutional Court of the Russian Federation, the Supreme Court of the Russian Federation, and the Supreme Arbitration Court. However, the Supreme Arbitration Court was dissolved in 2014, and its jurisdiction was transferred to the Supreme Court. Judges for each court are appointed by the Federation Council, based on proposals made by the President of Russia. This appointment process includes formal vetting, but remains subject to executive influence. The Constitution requires 19 judges for the Constitutional Court, but does not specify the number of justices for the other courts. As of 2002, the Supreme Court had 115 members; due to the expansion of its duties in 2014, the number of seats was increased to 170. In September 2014, the Institute of Modern Russia reported that the Supreme Arbitration Court had been dissolved and that judicial matters previously under its authority had been transferred to the jurisdiction of the Supreme Court.

== Amending the Constitution ==
The procedure for amending the Constitution is outlined in Chapter Nine. Proposals on amendments to and revision of the provisions of the Constitution of the Russian Federation may be submitted by the President of the Russian Federation, the Council of Federation, the State Duma, the Government of the Russian Federation, legislative (representative) bodies of constituent entities of the Russian Federation, and by groups consisting of not less than one fifth of the members of the Council of Federation or of the deputies of the State Duma.

Article 137 covers updating the provisions of Article 65 of the Constitution of Russia. An update regarding the change of the name of the subject of the Russian Federation is carried out by a decree of the President of Russia on bringing the name of the subject of the Russian Federation in the text of the Constitution of the Russian Federation in accordance with the decision of the subject of the Russian Federation. An update regarding changes in the subject composition of the Russian Federation is carried out in accordance with the federal constitutional law on the admission to the Russian Federation and the formation of a new constituent entity of the Russian Federation, on changes in the constitutional and legal status of the constituent entities of the Russian Federation, which should contain an indication of the inclusion of relevant changes or additions to Article 65 of the Constitution of Russia.

Article 136 covers updating the provisions of chapters 3, 4, 5, 6, 7, and 8 of the Constitution of Russia. An update is carried out in the form of a special act: a law of the Russian Federation on amendments to the Constitution, which is adopted by the parliament similarly to the federal constitutional law, but then also requires ratification by the legislative bodies of the constituent entities of the Federation. Moreover, one law of the Russian Federation on the amendment to the Constitution covers interrelated changes to the constitutional text; the law itself receives a name reflecting the essence of this amendment.

Article 135 covers updating the provisions of chapters 1, 2, and 9 of the Constitution of Russia. An update to any of these chapters is considered a revision of the Constitution's fundamental provisions, which is possible only through the adoption of the new Constitution of the Russian Federation by the Russian Constitutional Assembly or by popular vote.

Analysis of Russian officials' speeches shows an interesting trend. Before 2000 the changes to the constitution were not discussed. In 2001 for the first time it was mentioned that the Constitution of the Russian Federation should stay intact and till 2007 any substantial modifications of the Constitution were considered to be negative. Since 2007 the attitude to the changes were not already so strictly negative. In 2008 President Dmitry Medvedev addressed the Federal Assembly and presented the changes to the Constitution saying that the Russian Constitution is well established and should remain unchangeable. It was stressed in 2008 that it was not a constitutional reform, but only certain corrections.

=== 2008 amendments ===
The amendments of 2008, which were proposed in November 2008 and came into force on 31 December 2008, are the first substantial amendments to the Constitution of Russia of 1993 and extended the terms of the President of Russia and the State Duma from four to six and five years, respectively. Earlier only minor adjustments concerning the naming of the federal subjects or their merging were made, which require a much simpler procedure.

=== February 2014 amendments ===
In February 2014 the Higher Arbitration Court, which was mentioned in the Constitution of the Russian Federation, was eliminated from the judicial system of Russia. Therefore, the Constitution needed to be changed to reflect the changes in the judicial system.

=== July 2014 amendments ===
On 21 March 2014, Federal Constitutional Law No. 6 "On the Adoption of the Republic of Crimea into the Russian Federation and the Formation of New Subjects within the Russian Federation – the Republic of Crimea and the Federal City of Sevastopol" was adopted.

=== 2020 amendments ===
The amendments of 2020 remove the "in a row" clause from the article regulating the maximum number of presidential terms, discounting previous presidential terms before the amendment enters into force. Other changes are recognition of Russia as a successor to the Soviet Union in relation to international organizations, treaties, and assets of the USSR stipulated by international treaties outside the territory of the Russian Federation, banning ceding Russian territory, diminishing the accomplishments by the "defenders of the fatherland" and their role in World War II is no longer allowed, and enshrining God and heterosexual marriage in the constitution. Other amendments would enshrine the role of the Russian language as that of "state forming people", a constitutional reference to God and giving statutory backing to the State Council.

From 25 June to 1 July 2020, a nationwide vote took place, with 78 % of voters voting in favor of the amendments with a turnout of 65 %, according to official results.

Putin signed an executive order on 3 July 2020 to officially insert the amendments into the Russian Constitution; they took effect on 4 July 2020.

=== 2022 annexations ===
After the signing of annexation "treaties" with Russian occupation authorities during the 2022 invasion of Ukraine, the text of the constitution was updated to include the Donetsk People's Republic, Kherson Oblast, Luhansk People's Republic, and Zaporizhzhia Oblast. As of December 2022, none of these territories is fully controlled by Russian forces, and Russian law does not define their borders: Kremlin spokesperson Dmitry Peskov stated that Russia will "continue consultations with the residents" as to the oblast borders, and that the people's republics are annexed "in the 2014 borders", but high-level Russian collaborator Oleg Tsariov stated that "there are no 2014 borders".

== Differences between the Constitution and the laws ==
The Constitution of Russia:

- defines the state system, basic rights and freedoms, the form of the state and the system of supreme state authorities
- has the highest legal force
- has direct effect (the provisions of the constitution must be implemented regardless of whether other acts contradict them)
- is characterized by stability due to a special, complicated order of acceptance and change
- is the basis for the current legislation.

== Numismatics ==
On December 10, 2018, a commemorative coin made of copper-nickel alloy with a nominal value of 25 rubles "The 25th anniversary of the adoption of the Constitution of the Russian Federation" was issued. On the reverse of the coin there is a relief image of an open book with a drawing of the coat of arms of the Russian Federation on the left page and the inscription "КОНСТИТУЦИЯ РОССИЙСКОЙ ФЕДЕРАЦИИ" on the right page. The commemorative coin was issued in a circulation of 1,000,000 and is a legal means of cash payment in the territory of the Russian Federation.

== See also ==
=== Former constitutions ===
- October Manifesto (1905)
- Russian Constitution of 1906
- Decree on the system of government of Russia (1918)
- Soviet Russia Constitution of 1918
- Act on the establishment of the All-Russian supreme power (1918)
- 1924 Constitution of the Soviet Union
  - Russian Constitution of 1925
- 1936 Constitution of the Soviet Union
  - Russian Constitution of 1937
- 1977 Constitution of the Soviet Union
  - Russian Constitution of 1978

=== Others ===
- 2008 amendments to the Constitution of Russia
- 2020 amendments to the Constitution of Russia
- Constitution of the Soviet Union
- Constitutional economics
- Constitutionalism
- Impeachment in Russia
- Institute of State and Law
- Law of the Russian Federation
- Term limits in Russia
- Human rights in Russia
