= Sergey Trakhimenok =

Russian-born Belarusian writer

Sergey Aleksandrovich Trakhimenok
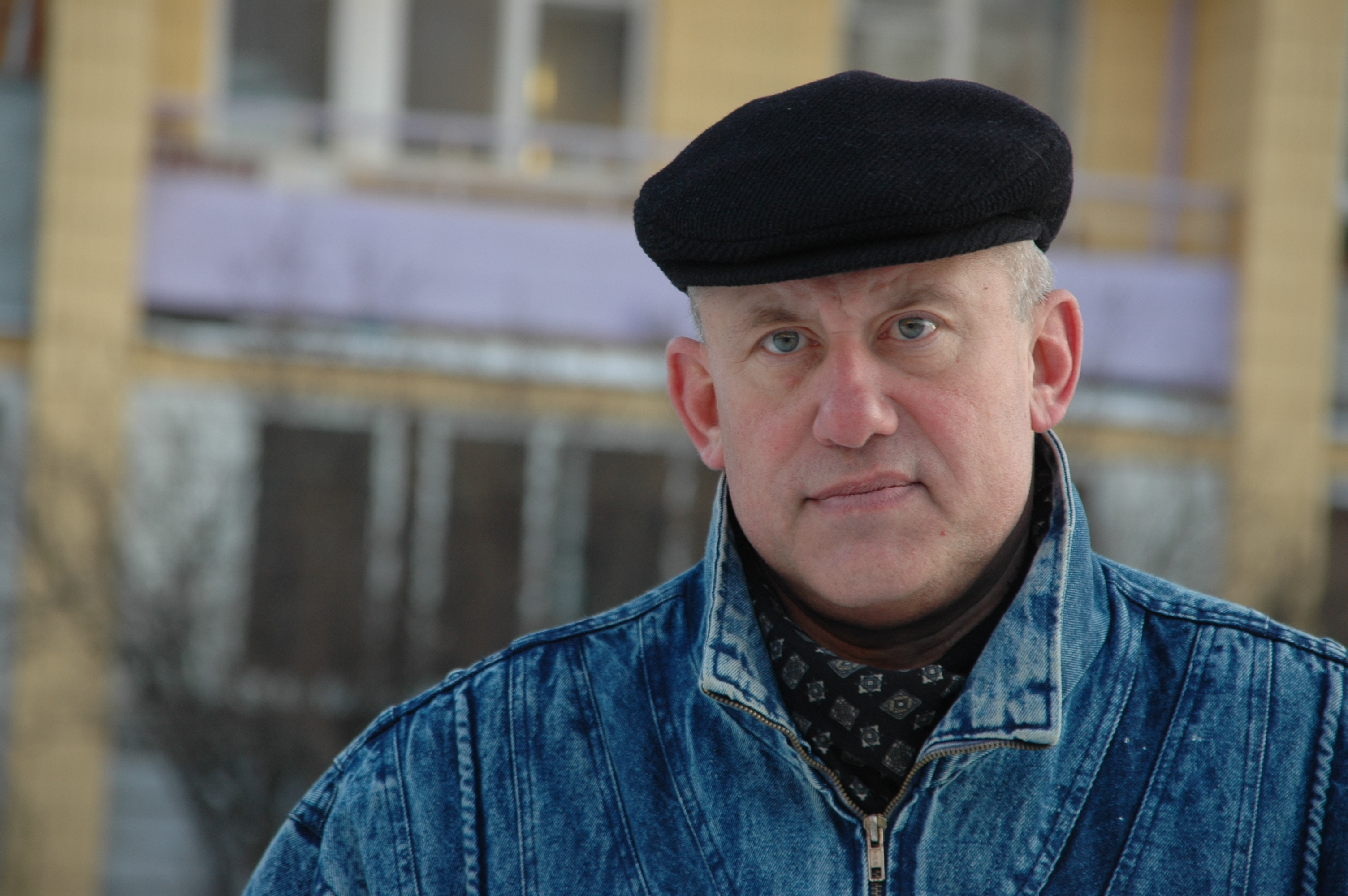
- Born: Сяргей Аляксандравіч Трахімёнак; February 7, 1950; Karasuk, Novosibirsk Region, Russia
- Occupations: writer, screenwriter

Sergey Aleksandrovich Trakhimenok, (Belarusian: Сяргей Аляксандравіч Трахімёнак, born February 7, 1950, in Karasuk, Novosibirsk Region) is a Belarusian writer who publishes in the Russian language. He is also a screenwriter, Doctor of Law, professor, secretary of the Belarusian Writers' Union, and a member of the Union of Russian Writers.

He is the author of thirty books of prose, the laureate of the "Gold Cupid" National Award (Belarus), the "Reward of the Ural Federal District", and an active associate of Association of Writers of Ural, Siberia and Povolzh'ya.

According to the philological scientific research of Russian Professor Alla Bolshakova: Russian-Belarusian writer Sergei Trahimenok belongs to the cohort of those "marginal" writers who continue to create works in Russian, despite the difficult process of rebuilding national identity in the former Soviet republics.

Trakhimenok is best known for his spy novel, Notes of a Black Colonel, psychological detective novel Burnout Syndrome (2008), and A Petri Bowl or Russian Civilization: the Genesis and Survival Problems (2012). As a screenwriter, he is a member of BELVIDEOCENTER. In 2014, he received the Finalist Certificate at the New York Festivals of World Best TV & Films in the competition Television – Documentary/Information Program in the category of Docudrama for his screenplay for the film Albert Veinik's Attraction.

== Career ==
Trakhimenok served in the army and worked at a factory. In 1977, he graduated from the Sverdlovsk Institute of Law, Faculty of Law. In 1981, he participated in the Higher Courses of the KGB. Since 1990, he has been living in Minsk and received two scientific degrees: Doctor of Law (1999) and professor (2003). He became a member of the Writers' Union of Russia in 1994 and the Union of Writers of Belarus in 1996. In 1996–1999, he headed the department of legal disciplines of the National Security Institute of the Republic of Belarus. In 1999–2000, he was appointed as the head of the Situation and Analytical Center of the State Secretariat of the Security Council of the Republic of Belarus. From 2005 to 2007, Trakhimenok was a deputy director of the Civil Service Institute, and since 2008 he has been the director of the Research Institute of Theory and Practice of the State Administration at The Academy of Public Administration, under the aegis of the president of the Republic of Belarus.

== Literary career ==
Trakhimenok began his literary activity in the late 1980s, mostly in the genre of adventure novel and detective. His stories were published in the weekly Youth of Siberia, and later in the magazines of Siberian Lights, Neman, Spring, Nemiga, Adventurer, Private Life, Belarusian Thought (Minsk), Novel-Magazine of the XXIst Century, Our Contemporary, Don (Rostov-on-Don), Rising-up (Voronezh), Space (Alma-Ata), Ladoga (St. Petersburg), Lights of Kuzbass (Kemerovo), "The Slav" (Kharkov), etc. In his first short novel The Hostage (1978), he described the first manifestations of terrorism in Russia. In the story, the hostages were not the only ones who had been captured by criminals, but also those who had to release them because they were on duty, and in those days they were not ready for this. But this short novel was published only in 1988. A number of Trakhimenok's short stories and short novels are devoted to the events and people's fates during the Second World War. For example, his "military prose" (Lieutenant Priblagin's Case, Crumbs, Dearest kryvinka, To the ceremonial march). Some of his stories have the theme "Children and War" (Crumbs, Dearest kryvinka, Belli puerri). There are author’s essays on this subject as well (War in the lens watering, A drop in the ocean of victory and others. In his social psychological realistic stories Vanity of Vanities, Bird Cherry Bloomed, The Prosecutor's Blood, The Driver, A Terrible Word "Cinema", A Needle in the Square, and Loop of Morbut, the author implies the knowledge of psychology of characters with clearly spelled out motivation for their actions. Trakhimenok is called the Master of Acute Plot because most of his fiction is created in the detective genre or detective fiction.

== Works ==
=== Scenarios ===
Some newsreels and documentaries were filmed on scenarios of Sergey Alexandrovich filmed:

- "The Case of Lieutenant Priblagin" (1995).
- "Etienne" (1998).
- "The Last of the Group Jack" (2000).
- "Kent" (2000),
- "Satellites of Saturn" (2002).
- "Remembering Chernyakhovskiy" (2004).
- "A Little Braver than Others." – Belvideotsentr - 2006.
- "Lika: Demobee’s Tale." – BelarusFilm. - 2007
- "Crown of Thorns of Olympus." – BelarusFilm. - 2010.
- "Fortress Upon the Bug." – BelvideoCentre. - 2011.
- "Lessons of physiognomy." – Studio STASH. - 2012.
- "The Attraction of Albert Veinik" – SRW of the Union State. – 2012.
- "Fortress". – Series "Testing" - TV - the 1st Channel - 2014.
- "SMERSH: radio games" Friends." – BelarusFilm, BelvideoCentre. - 2014.

=== Novels and Novellas (Russian/English titles) ===
- On the ignition. The Story. A Stolen Bail. – M.: Young Guards, 1991. – PP. 189–245 (По фактам возгораний. Повесть. Украденный залог. – М., Молодая гвардия, 1991. – С. 189-245.)
- Games of the Capricious Lady. Novel. –Minsk : "Yunatstva, Asar", 1995. – 287 p.(Игры капризной дамы. Роман. – Минск: «Юнатства, Асар», – 1995. – 287 с.)
- Detective at the End of the Century. Novels: Games of the Capricious Lady, Russian Thriller. -Moscow: Terra, 1996. - 624 p.(Детектив на исходе века. Романы: Игры капризной дамы, Российский триллер. – Москва: Терра, 1996. – 624 с.)
- Heavenly Cargo. Novel. The Story. - Minsk: Mastatskaya Literature, 1998. –251 p. (Груз небесный. Роман. Повесть. – Минск: Мастацкая литература, 1998. - 251 с.)
- Order for the Twenty-fifth. Novel. – Moscow: Contour, 1999. – 297 p. (Заказ на двадцать пятого. Роман. – Москва: Контур, 1999. – 297 с.)
- Female's Logic. Plays, screenplays. – Minsk: The Ark, 2000. – 163 p. (Женская логика. Пьесы, киносценарий. – Минск: Ковчег, 2000. – 163 с.)
- The Second Level. Novella. Stories. – Minsk: Asar, 2001. – 333 p. (Второй уровень. Повесть. Рассказы. – Минск: Асар, 2001. – 333 с.)
- Millennium in Avsyuky. Novella. – Minsk: Tehnoprint, 2004. – 126 p. (Миллениум в Авсюках. Повесть. – Минск: Технопринт, 2004. – 126 с.)
- Echo of Forgotten War. Novellas. Stories. Essays. – Minsk: Asar, 2004. – 319 p. (Эхо забытой войны. Повести. Рассказы. Очерки. – Минск: Асар, 2004. – 319 с.)
- Order for the Twenty-fifth. – Moscow: Russian word, 2006. – 382 p. (Заказ на двадцать пятого. – Москва: Русское слово, 2006. – 382 с.)
- By the Ceremonial March. Novel. Stories. – SPb .: Duma, 2006. – 381 p. (К торжественному маршу. Роман. Рассказы. – СПб.: Дума, 2006. – 381 с.)
- A Burnout Syndrome. Novel. Novella. – Minsk: Mastatskaya Literature, 2007. – 365 p. (Синдром выгорания. Роман. Повесть. – Минск: Мастацкая литература, 2007. – 365 с.)
- Dialectics of the Game. Novel. – Minsk: "Four Quarters", 2009. – 400 p. (Диалектика игры. Роман. – Минск: «Четыре четверти», 2009. – 400 с.)
- Shuttle Policy. – Minsk: "The Ark", 2009. – 146 p. (Челночная политика. – Минск: «Ковчег», 2009. – 146 с.)
- Dearest Kryvinka. – Minsk: "Harvest", 2009. – 464 p. (Родная крывинка. – Минск: «Харвест», 2009. – 464 с.)
- Veprev and others. - Moscow: "Kolos", 2009. – 760 p. (Вепрев и другие. – Москва: «Колос», 2009. – 760 с.)
- The Loop of Morbut. – Minsk: "Four Quarters", 2009. – 100 p. (Петля Морбут. – Минск: «Четыре четверти», 2009. – 100 с.)
- Notes of the "Black Colonel". – Minsk: "LiM", 2010. – 320 p. (Записки «черного полковника». – Минск: «ЛiМ», 2010. – 320 с.)
- Russian Thriller. – Minsk: Mastatskaya lit-ra, 2010. – 270 p. (Российский триллер. – Минск: Мастацкая лит-ра, 2010. – 270 с.)
- Belli puerri / T. Dashkevich, S. Trakhimenok. Belli puerri. – Minsk: Four quarters, 2010. – 216 p. (Белли пуэрри/Т. Дашкевич, С. Трахимёнок. Белли пуэрри. – Минск: Четыре четверти, 2010. – 216 с.)
- Unconquered Land / N. Golubeva, S. Trakhimenok. Unconquered Land. – Minsk: Belarusian Encyclopedia, 2011. – 368 p. (Земля непокоренная/Н.Голубева, С.Трахимёнок. Земля непокоренная. – Минск: Белорусская энциклопедия, 2011. – 368 с.)
- Bowl of Petri whether Russian Civilization: The Genesis and Survival Problems. – Minsk: "Literature and Art", 2011. – 504 p. (Чаша Петри ли русская цивилизация: генезис и проблемы выживания. – Минск: “Литература и искусство”, 2011. – 504 с.)
- Beel la Rus. Secrets of Names of Ancient Places / V.N. Degtyarev, S.A. Trakhimenok. Beel la Rus. Secrets of Names of Ancient Places // Series "Navigator for Adventurers and Treasure Hunters." – M.: White Alva, 2013. – 304 p. (Беел ла Русь. Тайны древних топонимов/В.Н.Дегтярев,С.А.Трахимёнок. Беел ла Русь. Тайны древних топонимов // Серия «Навигатор для экстремалов и кладоискателей». – М.: Белые альвы, 2013. – 304 с.)
- Crumbs. Novels and short stories. – Minsk: Mastatskaya Literature., 2013. – 207 p. (Крошки. Повесть и рассказы. – Минск: Мастацка литература, 2013. – 207 с.)
- The Phenomenon of a Drum. Novel, Short Stories. – Minsk: Star, 2013. – 224 p. (Феномен Бубна. Повесть, рассказы. – Минск: Звезда, 2013. – 224 с.)
- Notes of the "Black Colonel". – Moscow: Veche, 2013. – 400 p. (Записки «черного полковника». – Москва: Вече, 2013. – 400 с.)
- Reported from Siberia. Novel. – Moscow: Veche, 2014. – 320 p. (Из Сибири сообщают. Роман. – Москва: Вече, 2014. – 320 с.)
- Genome of Newton. Novella. – Minsk: Publishing House "Four Quarters", 2014. – 170 p. (Геном Ньютона. Повесть. – Минск: Изд-во «Четыре четверти», 2014. – 170 с.)
- This Magical World of Cinema / O.Burqin, S.Trakhimenok – Minsk: Star, 2014. – 296 p. (Этот волшебный мир кино / Буркин О., Трахимёнок С. – Минск: Звезда, 2014. – 296 с.)
- The Tungus Bolide. Novel. – Minsk: Mastatskaya Literature, 2014. –213 c. (Тунгусский болид. Роман. – Минск: Мастацкая литература, 2014. –213 c.)

=== Short Stories and Novellas Published in Periodicals ===
- The Driver. Story // Youth of Siberia. - № 39. - 1988. - pp. 5–9. (Возница. Рассказ // Молодость Сибири. – № 39. – 1988. – С. 5–9.)
- Heavenly Cargo. Novel (abbr.) // Neman. - № 7. - 1991 – pp. 17–87. (Груз небесный. Роман (сокр.) // Неман. – № 7. – 1991, – С. 17–87.)
- The Twelfth Apostle. The Story // Neman. - № 11. - 1993. - pp. 45–110. (Двенадцатый апостол. Повесть // Неман. – № 11. – 1993. – С. 45–110.)
- The Сase of Lieutenant Priblagin. Story // Krynica. - № 3. - 1993. - pp. 66–68. (Дело лейтенанта Приблагина. Рассказ // Криница. – № 3. – 1993. – C. 66–68.)
- Bird Berry was in Blossom
- A Debtor. A Story // Zrok. - № 3. - 1993. - Minsk. - pp. 18–22.
- Lessons of Physiognomy. Essay // Evening Novosibirsk. -5 August. - 1994. - P. 10.
- The Story of the Soul // Literary Russia. - № 48. - 1994. - pp. 8–9.
- Vita. A Story // Adventurer. - № 3. - 1994. - pp. 12–13.
- Ohlamon. A Story // Krynica. - № 2. - 1994. - Minsk. - pp. 40–43.
- It was Spring. A Story // Private life. - № 6. - 1995. - P. 36.
- In the shadow of magnolias. The Story // Neman. -№ 7. - 1995 - pp. 58–128.
- The Second Level. The Story // Neman. - № 12 - 1997. - pp. 7–77.
- Crumbs. A Story // Literary Russia. - № 33. - 1998. - pp. 8–9.
- Crumbs. A Story // Nyamiha literary. - № 1. - 1999 - pp. 62–75.
- To Survive // Literary Russia. - № 3. - 2000. - pp. 2–3.
- Good luck to you, Man. A Story // Literary Russia. - № 9. - 2000. - pp. 8–9.
- Literature can help society // Proceedings. - On 8 February. - 2000. - P. 9.
- War in the lens a watering can. Essay // Inspiration. - № 2. - Minsk. - 2001. - P. 10.
- Excess of Artist. The Story // Neman. - № 3. - 2001. - pp. 73–151.
- Sim conquer. Essay // Siberian Lights. - № 2. - 2001. - pp. 173–183.
- Vita. A Story // Moscow railway worker. - №31. - August 18. - 2001. - P. 15.
- Drop in the Ocean of Victory. Essay // Soviet Siberia. - On 31 May. - 2002. - pp. 9.
- Vanity of vanities. A Story // Nyamiha literary. - №1. - 2002. - pp. 69–74.
- I write books for free. For the soul // Courier. - DEC. - Minsk. - 2003. - pp. 30.
- The writer is born for one book // MIU informs. - № 3. - 2003. - Minsk. - pp. 4.
- They liberated Belarus. Essay // Inspiration. - № 1. - 2003. - Minsk. - pp. 24–25.

== Notes ==
Большакова Алла. Правда факта и поиск героя: о прозе Сергея Трахимёнка // Сибирские огни. № 2. — 2010</ref> Alla Bolshakova. Truth of Fact and Searching for a Hero: about Sergey Trakhimenok's fiction Большакова Алла. Правда факта и поиск героя: о прозе Сергея Трахимёнка // Сибирские огни. № 2. — 2010
