= 2008 amendments to the Constitution of Russia =

The amendments of 2008, which were proposed in November 2008 and came into force on 31 December 2008, were the first substantial amendments to the Constitution of Russia of 1993. The amendments extended the terms of the President of Russia and the State Duma from four to six and five years.

Earlier only minor adjustments concerning the naming of the federal subjects or their merging were made, which require a much simpler procedure.

== History ==
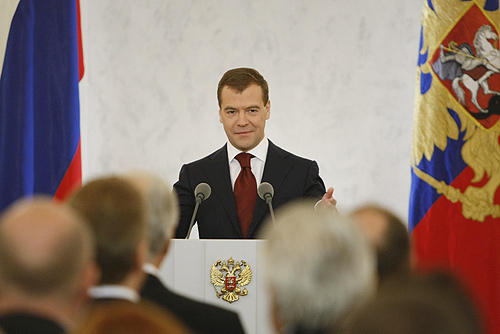
Dmitry Medvedev delivering his Annual Address to the Federal Assembly

President Dmitry Medvedev, who succeeded Vladimir Putin earlier that year, made that brief proposal during his first annual address to the Federal Assembly on 5 November 2008:

[W]e should increase the constitutional mandates of the President and State Duma to six and five years respectively.

These issues have been raised repeatedly since the 1990s. Discussions on these subjects have gone on for a long time. Many have made reference to history, which abounds with examples of democratic countries changing the terms and mandates of their state bodies.

I will not list all of these examples. These cases are well known. What I want to say is that we are not talking about constitutional reform but about adjustments to the Constitution, about adjustments that are important but are nonetheless no more than clarifications and do not change the political and legal essence of the current institutions. These adjustments provide rather an additional resource for the institutions' stable work. There is no place for a 'reforming itch' with regard to the Constitution. The Constitution is effective, it works, and its basic provisions should remain unchanged for many years to come. Civic rights and freedoms, the nation’s sovereignty, the state system and federal organisation, the organisation principles of the judicial system and local self-government, and the other foundations of our constitutional order have been set for a long-term historical period. As the guarantor of the Constitution, I will preserve and protect these fundamental provisions.

The change doesn't apply retroactively and shouldn't affect the current terms of the President and the State Duma and will take effect for the next time. As of 2008, the articles 81.1 and 96.1 of the Constitution of 1993 stipulated that the President and the State Duma should be elected for a term of four years. According to the articles 136 and 108, amendments to the provisions of Chapters 3–8, including the articles 81 and 96, require the same approval as a federal constitutional law, that is, a two-thirds supermajority vote in the State Duma, the lower house and a three-fourths supermajority vote in the Federation Council, the upper house, and come into force as they have passed the Regional legislatures of no less than two-thirds of the 83 federal subjects.

The President formally submitted the bill to the State Duma on 11 November. The State Duma, dominated by pro-government parties after the election of 2007, swiftly approved the proposal in the three required readings on 14 November (388 in favor/58 against), 19 November (351 in favor/57 against) and 21 November (392 in favor/57 against). Of the four parties represented in the State Duma, only the Communist Party, represented by 57 members of parliament, opposed the bill. The United Russia, Liberal Democratic Party and Fair Russia all supported the bill. Viktor Ilyukhin, a Communist legislator, commented during discussions in the State Duma on 14 November:

Why are we in such a hurry? A strict authoritarian regime has already been established in this country. There is already an unprecedented concentration of power in one person's hands.

The fractured opposition outside the parliament also condemned the proposed changes to the constitution. On 26 November the Federation Council approved the bill with 144 votes in favor and one against.

Yulia Latynina, journalist for The Moscow Times, speculated that the reform prefigures Vladimir Putin's return to the Kremlin, probably earlier than in May 2012, when Medvedev's term is set to expire. An unnamed official from the Presidential Executive Office cited by Vedomosti hinted that Medvedev could resign as early as in 2009. According to Vedomosti's source, the alleged plan was masterminded by Vladislav Surkov in 2007. A survey held by VTsIOM on 15–16 November showed 56% support of a longer presidency and extended term of parliament among the Russians. The support, however, was lower in big cities.

By 18 December, the provincial legislatures of all 83 federal subjects of Russia had approved the amendments. The Federation Council reviewed and accepted the approvals on 22 December and on 30 December President Medvedev signed them into law. The amendments were published in Rossiyskaya Gazeta and hence came into force on 31 December 2008.
