= Anton Ivanov (lawyer) =

Russian businessman and politician

- Антон Иванов
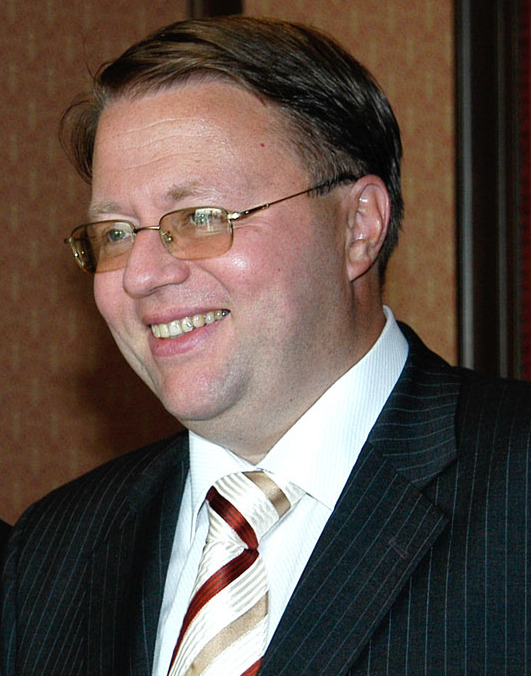

President of the High Court of Arbitration of Russia
- In office 26 January 2005 – 6 August 2014
- Preceded by: Veniamin Yakovlev
- Succeeded by: Office disestablished

Personal details
- Born: Anton Alexandrovich Ivanov; 6 July 1965 (age 61) Gatchina, Leningrad Oblast, Russian SFSR, Soviet Union
- Education: Leningrad State University (Law Faculty)
- Awards: Order "For Merit to the Fatherland" (3rd class)

Anton Alexandrovich Ivanov (Russian: Анто́н Алекса́ндрович Ивано́в; born 6 July 1965 in Gatchina, Leningrad Oblast, Russian SFSR, Soviet Union) is a Russian lawyer, businessman, and official who served as 2nd President of the High Court of Arbitration of Russia from 2005 until its abolition in 2014.

== Biography ==
Graduated from the Law Faculty of the Leningrad State University (1987, studied in the same group with Dmitry Medvedev), postgraduate studies at the same faculty (1990), MPhil in Law (1991, thesis title: "Ownership and commodity-money relations"). The widow of Anatoly Sobchak, Lyudmila Narusova, recalled: "I remember how in 1989, when Sobchak ran for MP mandate, this team, which included Ivanov, Medvedev, Kropachev, helped him, for example, glued leaflets and announcements on the pillars. Sobchak went against the nomenklatura, so it was a dangerous business."

- Since 1990 - Assistant, then associate professor of the Department of Civil Law, Faculty of Law, St. Petersburg State University (his main activity was teaching, combined the work at the university with other positions). Area of scientific interests: issues of real right, rent and insurance.
- In 1991–1995 - Leading Editor of the Law Journal “Higher Education Institutions. Jurisprudence".
- In June–November 1995 - Head of the Legal Department of the company Soyuzkontrakt-Services, which supplied food products to Russia.
- In 1995-1997 - Assistant Professor at the Department of Civil Law, Faculty of Law, St. Petersburg State University. He gave lectures on Roman law at the full-time department of the faculty, while Dmitry Medvedev touched on the same subject at the evening department.
- In January 1997 - April 1999 - Head of the St. Petersburg Department of Justice of the Ministry of Justice of Russia.
- In April - August 1999 - Legal Advisor to CJSC Balfort-Invest in Gatchina.
- In September 1999 - July 2004 - Associate Professor at the Department of Civil Law at St. Petersburg State University.
- From July 6, 2004 - First Deputy General Director of Gazprom Media, oversaw the issues of corporate construction and law.
- Since 2007, he has been the head of the civil law department of the National Research University Higher School of Economics, professor, scientific supervisor at the Faculty of Law, ordinary professor (since 2011), member of the Academic Council of the National Research University Higher School of Economics.
- In January 2005 - August 2014 - President of the High Court of Arbitration of the Russian Federation.

Member of the Council for the Codification and Improvement of Civil Legislation under the President of Russia. Since 1998 - Member of the Board of Trustees of the Foundation for Citizens Legal Education. He was a member of the St. Petersburg City Bar.

Engaged in scientific activities since 1987. Has a number of scientific works. Co-author of one of the most famous Russian textbooks on civil law (edited by A. P. Sergeev and Iu. K. Tolstoy; among co-authors are Nikolai Egorov, Ilya Eliseev, Mikhail Krotov, Dmitry Medvedev, and others), and in 2001 was awarded the prize of the Russian government in Education. He was awarded the Medal of Anatoly Koni. He is also the academic supervisor of the Higher School of Economics Law Faculty since 2006 and the tenured professor since 2011.

In 1994, together with fellow students Dmitry Medvedev and Ilya Eliseev, established the consulting firm Balfort.
