= 1993 Russian constitutional referendum =

National referendum on Russian Constitution

- 12 December 1993
- Do you accept the draft Constitution of the Russian Federation?

Results
Choice	Votes	%
Yes	32,937,630	58.43%
No	23,431,333	41.57%
Valid votes	56,368,963	97.65%
Invalid or blank votes	1,357,909	2.35%
Total votes	57,726,872	100.00%
Registered voters/turnout	106,170,835	54.37%
- Results by federal subject

A constitutional referendum was held in Russia on 12 December 1993. The new constitution was approved by 58% of voters, and came into force on 25 December.

== Background ==
Since 1992, President Boris Yeltsin had been arguing that the 1978 constitution was obsolete and needed replacing. He called for a new constitution which would grant more powers to the President. However, two competing drafts of a new constitution were drawn up by the government and the Congress of People's Deputies. Failure of the two groups to reach a compromise led to Yeltsin dissolving the Congress of People's Deputies in September 1993, leading to a constitutional crisis.

Yeltsin then called a Constitutional Assembly that was sympathetic to his views. The Assembly subsequently drafted a constitution that provided for a strong presidency, and was published on 11 November.

== Name ==
This referendum was officially named "nationwide voting" (Russian: всенародное голосование, romanized: vsenarodnoye golosovaniye) in documents.

Раздел второй
Заключительные и переходные положения
1. Конституция Российской Федерации вступает в силу со дня официального ее опубликования по результатам всенародного голосования.

— 1993 Constitution of Russia

Translated:

Second Section
Concluding and Transitional Provisions
1. The Constitution of the Russian Federation shall come into force from the moment of its official publication according to the results of a nationwide voting.

== Results ==
Voter turnout was officially reported as 54%, over the 50% threshold required to validate the referendum. However, doubts remained over the accuracy of the turnout figure, exacerbated by the quick destruction of ballots and area tallies.

Choice	Votes	%
For	32,937,630	58.43
Against	23,431,333	41.57
Total	56,368,963	100.00
Valid votes	56,368,963	97.65
Invalid/blank votes	1,357,909	2.35
Total votes	57,726,872	100.00
Registered voters/turnout	106,170,835	54.37
Source: Nohlen & Stöver

=== By region ===
Margin of victory by region

Federal subject		For		Against		Invalid/ blank	Total	Registered voters	Turnout
Federal subject		Votes	%	Votes	%	Invalid/ blank	Total	Registered voters	Turnout
1	Adygea	74,846	38.90	117,571	61.10	3157	195,574	323,612	60.43
2	Bashkortostan	721,769	42.01	996,135	57.99	52,113	1,770,017	2,824,125	62.67
3	Buryatia	204,779	57.96	148,547	42.04	15,479	368,805	663,957	55.55
4	Altai	43,629	55.97	34,316	44.03	2818	80,763	123,091	65.61
5	Dagestan	141,697	20.86	537,601	79.14	11,332	690,630	1,089,626	63.38
6	Ingushetia	37,583	56.90	28,469	43.10	877	66,929	124,754	53.65
7	Kabardino-Balkaria	185,214	63.26	107,553	36.74	5849	298,616	508,683	58.70
8	Kalmykia	57,258	51.52	53,880	48.48	6359	117,497	206,944	56.78
9	Karachay-Cherkessia	55,512	28.00	142,743	72.00	3353	201,608	286,579	70.35
10	Karelia	210,730	70.88	86,571	29.12	7760	305,061	577,618	52.81
11	Komi	239,180	63.77	135,893	36.23	9158	384,231	808,418	47.53
12	Mari	156,179	52.43	141,695	47.57	10,235	308,109	537,282	57.35
13	Mordovia	153,778	37.14	260,220	62.86	10,737	424,735	689,309	61.62
14	Yakutia	214,263	55.01	175,253	44.99	19,403	408,919	625,432	65.38
15	North Ossetia	132,202	53.09	116,801	46.91	7626	256,629	421,500	60.88
16	Tatarstan (Note: Tatarstan authorities called on the population to boycott the popular vote (which resulted in an extremely low turnout), but did not interfere with his conduct)	264,028	74.84	88,758	25.16	13,434	366,220	2,638,575	13.88
17	Tuva	31,310	31.21	68,999	68.79	4240	104,549	165,620	63.13
18	Udmurtia	301,026	57.45	222,912	42.55	16,452	540,390	1,134,009	47.65
19	Khakassia	99,737	58.47	70,839	41.53	5146	175,722	384,234	45.73
20	Chechnya (Note: Chechen authorities prevented the holding of the popular vote in the republic.)	–	–	–	–	–	–	–	–
21	Chuvashia	237,107	41.58	333,131	58.42	22,315	592,553	943,458	62.81
22	Altai Krai	524,005	51.17	499,969	48.83	22,039	1,046,013	1,929,497	54.21
23	Krasnodar Krai	970,838	51.16	926,925	48.84	34,229	1,931,992	3,546,775	54.47
24	Krasnoyarsk	653,489	61.84	403,173	38.16	23,596	1,080,258	2,117,784	51.01
25	Primorsky Krai	551,447	71.45	220,368	28.55	19,836	791,651	1,549,823	51.08
26	Stavropol Krai	607,825	54.15	514,693	45.85	18,948	1,141,466	1,809,146	63.09
27	Khabarovsk Krai	352,619	70.46	147,843	29.54	13,692	514,154	1,081,802	47.53
28	Amur	191,060	50.24	189,231	49.76	6811	387,102	670,701	57.72
29	Arkhangelsk	410,905	73.24	150,109	26.76	12,960	573,974	1,059,404	54.18
30	Astrakhan	208,298	58.48	147,914	41.52	8791	365,003	723,936	50.42
31	Belgorod	311,577	44.95	381,649	55.05	11,758	704,984	1,055,318	66.80
32	Bryansk	293,494	42.36	399,442	57.64	12,377	705,313	1,094,780	64.43
33	Vladimir	425,548	59.63	288,121	40.37	19,230	732,899	1,227,727	59.70
34	Volgograd	503,391	48.72	529,808	51.28	28,743	1,061,942	1,926,086	55.13
35	Vologda	393,088	69.84	169,761	30.16	13,633	576,482	974,026	59.19
36	Voronezh	502,358	45.16	610,006	54.84	19,293	1,131,657	1,922,595	58.86
37	Ivanovo	343,390	64.02	193,015	35.98	14,274	550,679	966,579	56.97
38	Irkutsk	621,676	74.16	216,571	25.84	17,947	856,194	1,767,955	48.43
39	Kaliningrad	251,575	66.33	127,711	33.67	8949	388,235	691,226	56.17
40	Kaluga	250,653	50.60	244,750	49.40	9896	505,299	806,958	62.62
41	Kamchatka	86,239	71.03	35,176	28.97	2574	123,989	286,983	43.20
42	Kemerovo	683,552	62.30	413,681	37.70	37,252	1,134,485	2,147,965	52.82
43	Kirov	412,671	61.38	259,682	38.62	19,851	692,204	1,199,823	57.69
44	Kostroma	201,711	58.00	146,048	42.00	7237	354,996	594,812	59.68
45	Kurgan	264,749	57.24	197,794	42.76	9186	471,729	780,223	60.46
46	Kursk	274,704	43.79	352,647	56.21	10,119	637,470	996,385	63.98
47	Leningrad	466,167	67.58	223,604	32.42	15,586	705,357	1,258,387	56.05
48	Lipetsk	229,086	42.38	311,525	57.62	12,352	552,963	923,922	59.85
49	Magadan	60,854	68.56	27,912	31.44	1732	90,498	186,780	48.45
50	Moscow	1,841,771	62.94	1,084,423	37.06	90,718	3,016,912	5,374,056	56.14
51	Murmansk	284,984	71.30	114,698	28.70	8824	408,506	806,705	50.64
52	Nizhny Novgorod	820,215	57.47	607,076	42.53	41,952	1,469,243	2,832,863	51.86
53	Novgorod	202,832	63.04	118,936	36.96	7709	329,477	559,612	58.88
54	Novosibirsk	509,592	51.52	479,479	48.48	23,205	1,012,276	2,005,969	50.46
55	Omsk	491,751	57.79	359,208	42.21	22,419	873,378	1,506,471	57.98
56	Orenburg	482,966	58.02	349,472	41.98	20,026	852,464	1,551,638	54.94
57	Oryol	186,463	42.61	251,090	57.39	7361	444,914	687,002	64.76
58	Penza	289,550	39.91	435,965	60.09	13,496	739,011	1,152,399	64.13
59	Perm	715,229	79.79	181,122	20.21	24,379	920,730	1,995,770	46.13
60	Pskov	241,283	56.96	182,353	43.04	6498	430,134	643,485	66.84
61	Rostov	929,506	51.50	875,503	48.50	41,588	1,846,597	3,236,960	57.05
62	Ryazan	327,812	50.58	320,304	49.42	13,465	661,581	1,019,518	64.89
63	Samara	705,425	56.87	534,884	43.13	33,205	1,273,514	2,424,184	52.53
64	Saratov	586,019	51.06	561,711	48.94	23,346	1,171,076	2,009,819	58.27
65	Sakhalin	147,406	63.96	83,052	36.04	5863	236,321	473,474	49.91
66	Sverdlovsk	1,299,299	79.84	327,990	20.16	38,543	1,665,832	3,426,954	48.61
67	Smolensk	236,097	42.82	315,289	57.18	9944	561,330	873,729	64.25
68	Tambov	257,133	41.99	355,301	58.01	13,331	625,765	977,867	63.99
69	Tver	387,026	51.34	366,841	48.66	16,657	770,524	1,239,450	62.17
70	Tomsk	217,624	68.45	100,308	31.55	9061	326,993	728,062	44.91
71	Tula	488,714	58.22	350,643	41.78	23,602	862,959	1,441,233	59.88
72	Tyumen	282,917	67.77	134,576	32.23	11,935	429,428	883,203	48.62
73	Ulyanovsk	314,216	51.16	299,926	48.84	14,056	628,198	1,059,023	59.32
74	Chelyabinsk	1,009,544	77.21	298,000	22.79	27,893	1,335,437	2,631,098	50.76
75	Chita	224,548	56.81	170,739	43.19	10,428	405,715	790,137	51.35
76	Yaroslavl	397,898	66.33	202,013	33.67	16,348	616,259	1,098,483	56.10
77	Moscow (City)	2,474,524	69.94	1,063,406	30.06	75,817	3,613,747	6,987,494	51.72
78	Saint Petersburg	1,391,887	71.61	551,765	28.39	28,408	1,972,060	3,760,852	52.44
79	Jewish AO	44,406	64.85	24,071	35.15	2152	70,629	137,038	51.54
80	Agin-Buryat AO	19,201	69.90	8,270	30.10	846	28,317	44,387	63.80
81	Komi-Permyak AO	46,432	81.44	10,580	18.56	1603	58,615	102,909	56.96
82	Koryakia	9,267	73.98	3,259	26.02	792	13,318	22,828	58.34
83	Nenets AO	13,338	74.41	4,587	25.59	554	18,479	31,470	58.72
84	Taymyr	13,815	81.80	3,074	18.20	507	17,396	29,411	59.15
85	Ust-Orda Buryat AO	45,577	80.89	10,764	19.11	996	57,337	82,871	69.19
86	Khanty-Mansi AO	253,458	81.84	56,224	18.16	5919	315,601	794,131	39.74
87	Chukotka	31,503	75.88	10,015	24.12	876	42,394	75,661	56.03
88	Evenkia	5,176	68.94	2,332	31.06	177	7685	13,863	55.44
89	Yamalo-Nenets AO	102,430	80.34	25,069	19.66	2676	130,175	284,532	45.75
Total		32,937,630	58.43	23,431,333	41.57	1,357,909	57,726,872	106,170,835	54.37
Source: Central Election Commission of Russia
