= Sergei Alexeyev =

Soviet and Russian legal scholar and politician

- Сергей Алексеев
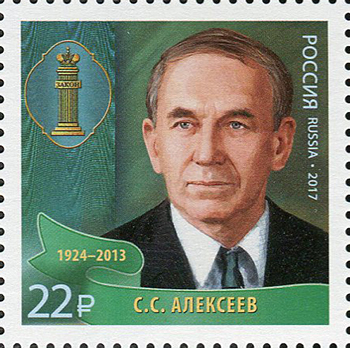
- Alexeyev on a 2017 Russian post stamp
- Born: Sergei Sergeyevich Alexeyev; July 28, 1924; Oryol, Russian SFSR, USSR
- Died: 12 May 2013 (aged 88); Saint Petersburg, Russia
- Spouse: Zoya Alexeyeva
- Awards: Order "For Merit to the Fatherland" (3rd class), Order of Friendship of Peoples, Order of the Patriotic War (2nd class), Order of the Badge of Honour, USSR State Prize, Demidov Prize

Academic background
- Education: Sverdlovsk Law Institute (Specialist, Candidate of Sciences); Leningrad State University (Doctor of Sciences)
- Thesis: The Subject of Soviet Socialist Civil Law (1960)

Academic work
- Discipline: Jurisprudence, civil law
- Institutions: Ural State Law University; Russian Academy of Sciences
- Main interests: Legal theory, philosophy of law, legal state, socialist law

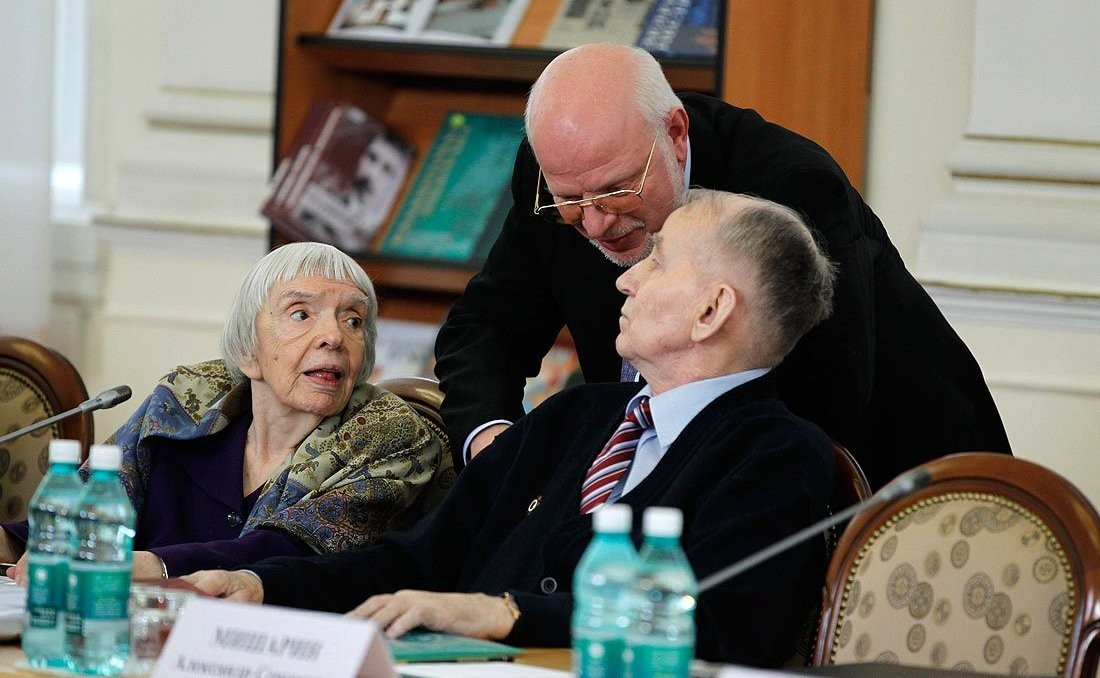
Sergei Alexeyev (on the right) with Lyudmila Alexeyeva and Mikhail Fedotov, 2011

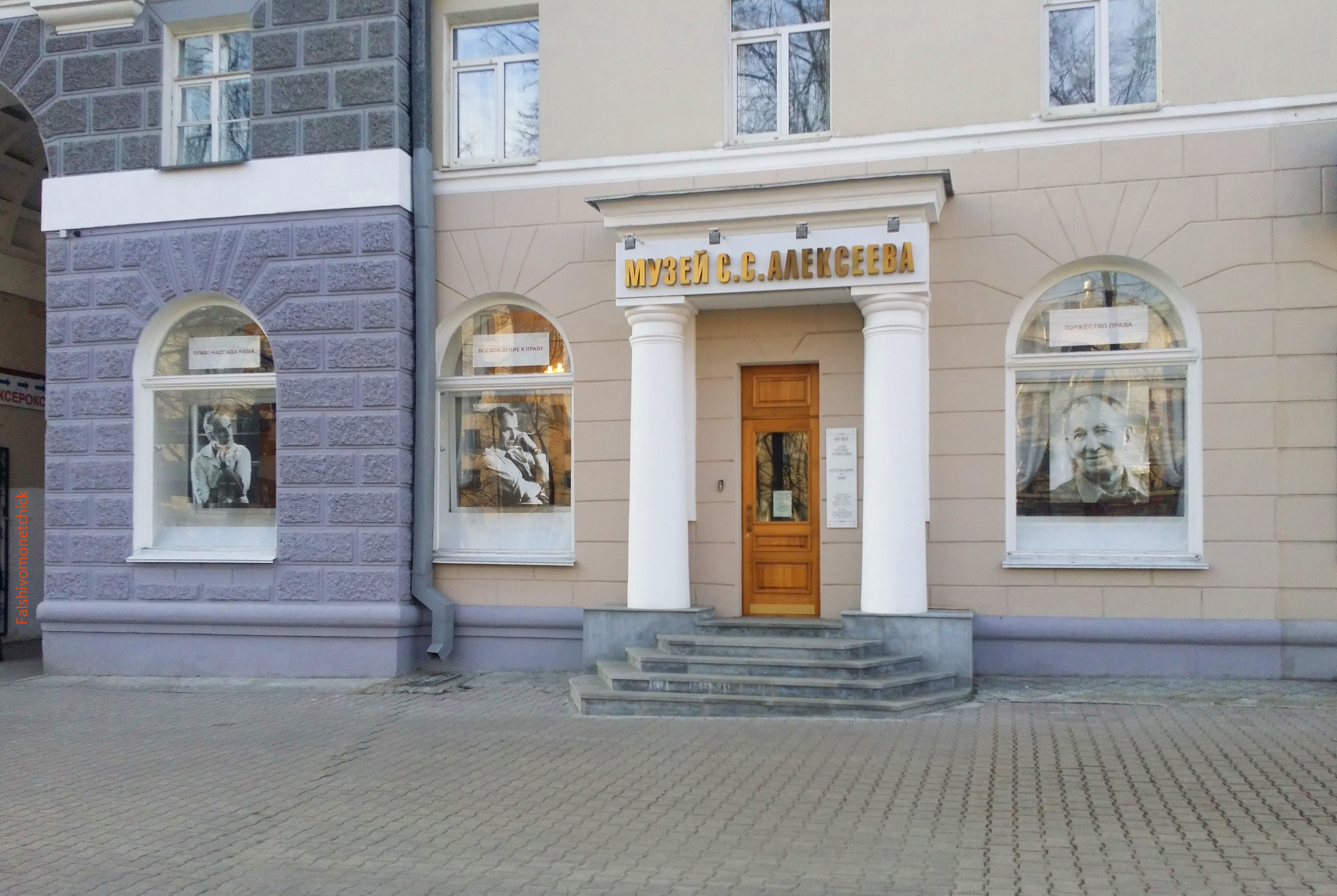
Sergei Alexeyev Museum in Yekaterinburg

Sergei Sergeyevich Alexeyev (Russian: Серге́й Серге́евич Алексе́ев; 28 July 1924 – 12 May 2013) was a Soviet and Russian legal theorist, scholar of civil law and politician. He was the first and only chairman of the Committee for Constitutional Supervision of the USSR from 1990 to 1991. Later, he was one of the co-authors of the Constitution of Russia of 1993, along with Anatoly Sobchak and Sergey Shakhray.

== Death ==
On 12 May 2013 Alexeyev died of a heart attack.
