= Veniamin Yakovlev =

Russian jurist

- Вениамин Яковлев
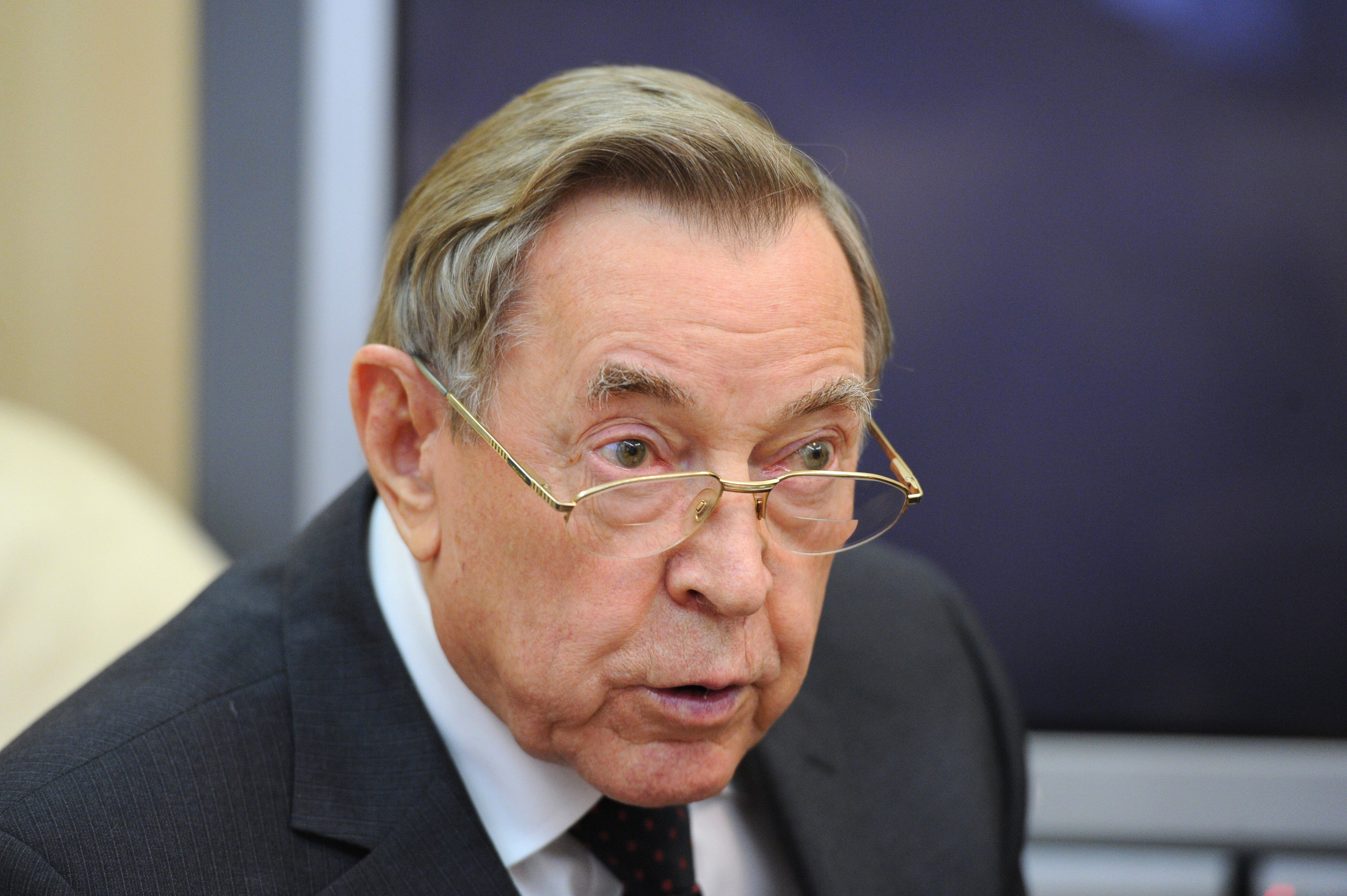
- Yakovlev in 2011

Adviser to the President of Russia
- In office 31 January 2005 – 24 July 2018
- President: Vladimir Putin; Dmitry Medvedev

President of the High Court of Arbitration of Russia
- In office 23 January 1992 – 26 January 2005
- Preceded by: Office established
- Succeeded by: Anton Ivanov

President of the High Court of Arbitration of the Soviet Union
- In office 27 December 1990 – 27 November 1991
- Preceded by: Office established
- Succeeded by: Office disestablished

Minister of Justice of the Soviet Union
- In office 1 August 1989 – 11 December 1990
- President: Mikhail Gorbachev
- Prime Minister: Nikolai Ryzhkov
- Preceded by: Boris Kravtsov
- Succeeded by: Sergei Lushchikov

Personal details
- Born: Veniamin Fyodorovich Yakovlev; February 12, 1932 Yudino, Ural Oblast, Russian SFSR, Soviet Union
- Died: 24 July 2018 (aged 86) Moscow, Russia
- Party: Communist Party of the Soviet Union (1956–1991)
- Spouse: Galina Yakovleva
- Children: 2
- Education: Ural State Law University (LL.D.)
- Awards: Full cavalier of the Order "For Merit to the Fatherland"; Order of Holy Prince Daniel of Moscow; Medal "In Commemoration of the 850th Anniversary of Moscow"

Veniamin Fyodorovich Yakovlev (Russian: Вениамин Фёдорович Яковлев, 12 February 1932 – 24 July 2018) was a Soviet and Russian legal scholar and judge. He was the first and only President of the High Court of Arbitration of the Soviet Union and later became the first President of the High Court of Arbitration of Russia. He also served as the Soviet Minister of Justice from 1989 to 1990 and as the adviser on legal issues to both Vladimir Putin and Dmitry Medvedev from 2005 till his death in 2018.

== Early life and education ==
Yakovlev was born in the village of Yudino, Ural Oblast (now known as the town of Petukhovo, Kurgan Oblast), on 12 February 1932, in a peasants family, who had moved to Western Siberia as part of a mass migration in the early 19th century. After completing his education at a school in Ishim, Tyumen Oblast, Yakovlev enrolled in the Sverdlovsk Law Institute to study law.

== Career ==
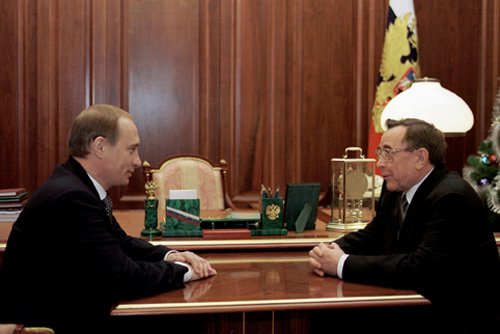
Yakovlev and Vladimir Putin, 2000

After receiving his law degree in 1953, Yakovlev taught civil law. From 1956 to 1960, he served as the Senior Assistant Prosecutor of Soviet Yakutia. During this time, he joined the Communist Party of the Soviet Union in 1956 and remained a member until 1991.

In 1963, Yakovlev returned to his alma mater as a senior lecturer. He received his doctorate in juridical science in 1973 by defending his thesis on "The Civil Law Method of Regulating Public Relations". From 1973 to 1987, he headed the department of civil law and concurrently served as prorector for academic affairs.

In 1987, Yakovlev moved to Moscow and led several legal research institutes and commissions.

In 1989 he was appointed Soviet Minister of Justice. The next year, Yakovlev became Chief State Arbitrator oft the Soviet Union, and after the position was abolished, he headed the Soviet Supreme Arbitration Court, serving as its first and only President until the end of 1991

During the 28th Congress of the CPSU, Yakovlev was elected a member of the Party's Central Committee.

In April 1992, the Congress of People's Deputies of Russia appointed Yakovlev as the President of the newly established High Court of Arbitration.

In 2003, Yakovlev was elected as a corresponding member of the Russian Academy of Sciences. From 2006 to 2018, he headed the Department of Legal Regulation in Fuel and Energy Industry at MGIMO and the Department of the Legal Coverage of the Free Market Economy at RANEPA. Throughout his career, Yakovlev taught civil law, business law, and civil procedure.

Since 2005, Yakovlev has served as legal adviser to the President of Russia. From 2005 to 2009, he concurrently served as the Presidential Representative to the Higher Judges' Qualifications Board.

== Death and legacy ==
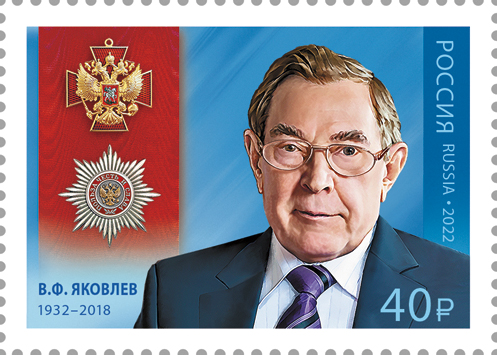
Veniamin Yakovlev on a 2022 Russian post stamp

Yakovlev died in Moscow on 24 July 2018 and was interred at the Shirokorechenskoye Cemetery in Yekaterinburg.

In 2022, in recognition of his contributions to the legal profession, the Ural State Law University, which Yakovlev graduated from in 1953, was renamed in his honor. A year prior, a commemorative plaque was unveiled on the wall of the main building of USLU.

In 2022, a Russian Post stamp featuring Yakovlev's image was issued.

In 2023, a second commemorative plaque was installed on the apartment building in Central Moscow where Yakovlev resided from 2002 until his passing (12 Rochdelskaya Street, Presnensky District).

In the same year, a section of Shartashskaya Street in Yekaterinburg, which houses the Arbitration Court of Sverdlovsk Oblast, has been renamed Veniamin Yakovlev Lane.

In 2024, a monument to Veniamin Yakovlev was placed in the Ural State Law University's campus in Yekaterinburg.

== Honors and awards ==
- Order "For Merit to the Fatherland", IV class (2012)
- Badge of the Council of Judges of the Russian Federation "For Service to Justice" (2012)
- Russian Federation Presidential Certificate of Honour (2008)
- Order of Holy Prince Daniel of Moscow, II class (2007)
- Honorary Citizen of Sverdlovsk Oblast (2007)
- Order "For Merit to the Fatherland", I class (2005)
- Honorary Civil Order of the Golden Cross "For Service to Society" (2004)
- Order "For Merit to the Fatherland", II class (2002)
- Order "For Merit to the Fatherland", III class (1997)
- Medal "In Commemoration of the 850th Anniversary of Moscow" (1997)
- Medal of Anatoly Koni (1996)
- Honoured Lawyer of Russia (1982)
