= High Court of Arbitration of Russia =

Emblem of the High Court of Arbitration of Russia

The High Court of Arbitration of the Russian Federation (also translated as the Supreme Court of Arbitration or the Higher Arbitration Court; Russian: Высший Арбитражный суд Российской Федерации) was the court of final instance in commercial disputes in Russia from 1992 to 2014. Additionally, it supervised the work of lower courts of arbitration and gave interpretation of laws and elucidations concerning their implementations, which are compulsory for lower courts. It was replaced by a 30-Judge Judicial Chamber for Commercial Disputes that is part of an expanded Russian Supreme Court effective August 8, 2014.

== History ==
Commercial arbitrations in Russia existed long before the October Revolution, though their powers were very limited. They were abolished immediately after the revolution. In 1922 the Supreme Arbitration Commission, attached to the Councitate Arbitration of the USSR was to resolve disputes about contracts exchanged between enterprises subordinate to various governmental agencies. The disputes arising within one agency's jurisdiction were not brought to the State Arbitration. Whenever the State Arbitration discovered any violations of law, its duty was to report about it to respective law enforcement offices. Similar state arbitrations were created in republics of the USSR.

In 1960 new State Arbitration attached to the Council of Ministers of the USSR Regulations were adopted by the Council of Ministers of the USSR. It de facto established stare decisis principle, since upper state arbitrations were empowered to give compulsory elucidations to the lower ones.

The position of the State Arbitration underwent crucial changes in 1987. The courts of arbitration became a separate branch of courts not subject to the control of the executive branch.

The High Court of Arbitration of Russia ceased operation on August 6, 2014, in relation to the merger with Supreme Court.

== Composition ==
All judges of the High Court of Arbitration including the President were nominated by the president of Russia and appointed by the Federation Council. In order to become a judge a person had to be at least 35 years old, had legal education and 10 years of experience in legal practice. Only Russian nationals could serve as judges.

The President of the High Court of Arbitration supervised the work of the court. He convened sessions of the Presidium of the Court and plenary sessions, appointed the Court's employees and guided its work, and represented the Court in governmental offices. The last President of the Court was Anton Ivanov. The President had several deputies.

There were two Boards in the High Court of Arbitration, which supervised decisions of lower courts of arbitration whenever appeal is lodged by a disappointed party. One Board heard cases concerning private law and the other heard cases concerning public law (for example, if a corporation is charged with tax evasion or files for bankruptcy).

The Presidium of the High Court of Arbitration dealt with appeals on decisions of lower courts of arbitration which had entered into force. Only the Prosecutor General of Russia, President of the High Court of Arbitration and his deputies could bring an appeal to the Presidium. When a case was heard in the Presidium, execution of the decision of a lower court might be delayed.

On plenary sessions the Court studied judicial practice and gave recommendations regarding applications by lower courts of particular provisions. In fact, lower courts had to apply recommendations of the High Court of Arbitration. The procedural Code of Arbitration provided that the Presidium of the High Court of Arbitration was entitled to reverse a decision of a lower court if it did not follow common judicial practice. Organizational matters were also dealt with on plenary sessions. They had to take place at least twice a year.

== List of the Russian High Court of Arbitration Presidents ==
President		Took office	Left office	Length of service
1	Veniamin Yakovlev (1932–2018)	23 January 1992	26 January 2005	13 years, 3 days
2	Anton Ivanov (1965–)	26 January 2005	6 August 2014	9 years, 192 days

== See also ==
- Judiciary of Russia
