= Pavel Krasheninnikov =

Russian jurist and politician

Pavel Krasheninnikov MP
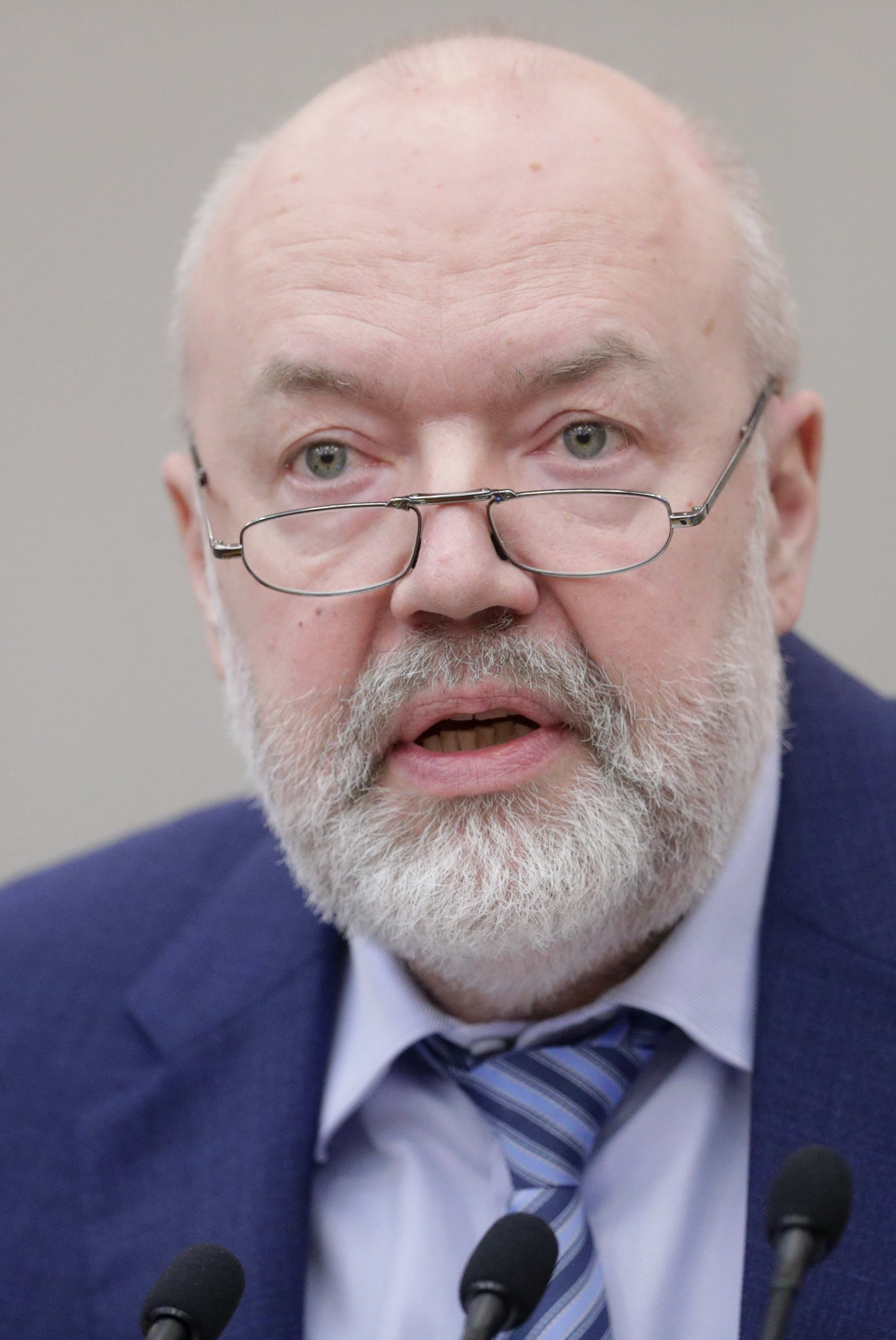

Chairman of the State Duma committee on State Construction and Legislation
- Incumbent
- Assumed office 5 October 2016
- Preceded by: Vladimir Pligin

Deputy of the State Duma
- Incumbent
- Assumed office 19 December 1999
- Preceded by: Alexander Chershintsev
- Constituency: Sverdlovsk Oblast; Magnitogorsk (No. 185)

Minister of Justice of Russia
- In office 30 April 1998 – 18 August 1999
- President: Boris Yeltsin
- Prime Minister: Sergey Kiriyenko; Yevgeny Primakov; Sergei Stepashin
- Preceded by: Sergei Stepashin
- Succeeded by: Yury Chaika

Personal details
- Born: 21 June 1964 (age 61) Polevskoy, Russian SFSR, Soviet Union
- Party: Union of Right Forces (1999-2003); United Russia (since 2003)
- Education: Sverdlovsk Law Institute
- Occupation: Jurist; Politician; Professor
- Pavel Krasheninnikov's voice From the Echo of Moscow program, 23 March 2015

Pavel Vladimirovich Krasheninnikov (Russian: Павел Владимирович Крашенинников; born 21 June 1964) is a Russian jurist, legal scholar and politician. Chairman of the State Duma Russia committee on State Construction and Legislation from 5 Octobrper 2016 year.

== Early life and education ==
Krasheninnikov was born in Polevskoy, a town in Sverdlovsk Oblast, 50 kilometers southwest of Sverdlovsk (now Yekaterinburg), on 21 June 1964. He graduated from a building vocational school in Magnitogorsk in 1983 and then studied law at the Sverdlovsk Law Institute.

== Career ==
From 1989 to 1993, Krasheninnikov taught civil law in Sverdlovsk Law Institute (known as Ural State Law Academy since 1992). At the same time, he worked as a legal expert for the Supreme Soviet of Russia.

=== Federal civil servant (1993-1999) ===
In 1993, he was appointed chief of the directorate for civil and economic legislation of the Russian Justice Ministry. From 1996 to 1997, he served as deputy chairman of the State Antimonopoly Committee.

In 1996, Krasheninnikov received his doctorate in law by defending a thesis "Modern issues of ownership and other property rights in residential premises" in Moscow State University.

In 1997, Krasheninnikov was appointed First Deputy Minister of Justice. From March 1998 to August 1999 he served as Justice Minister of Russia (Sergei Kiriyenko's Cabinet, Yevgeny Primakov's Cabinet, Sergei Stepashin's Cabinet). At the same time, he was a member of the Security Council of Russia.

After leaving office, Krasheninnikov was appointed rector of the Russian School of Private Law, which he headed from 1999 to 2010.

=== Member of State Duma (1999-present) ===
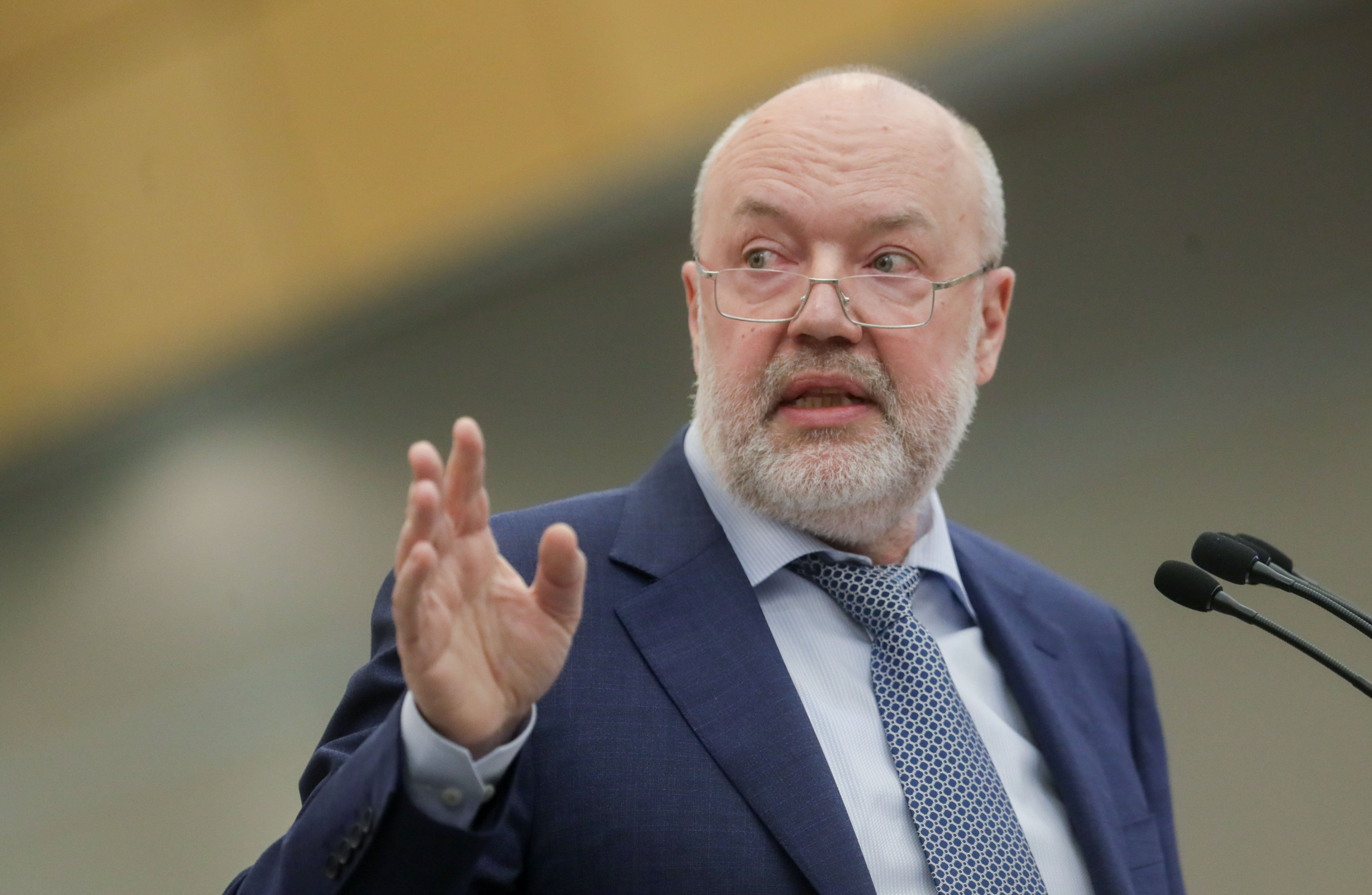
Krasheninnikov giving a speech in State Duma, 2021

Since 1999 he has been a Deputy of the State Duma, at first representing Union of Right Forces, later joining United Russia. He claimed that it would be easier for him to implement liberal reforms as part of the party of power, rather than through external factions. In 1999, he chaired the Committee on Legislation. After being re-elected in 2003, Krasheninnikov chaired the reformed Committee on Civil, Criminal, Arbitral and Procedure Legislation. He kept his position of the committee chairman both after 2007 and 2011 legislative elections. Since 2016, he has chaired the reformed Committee on State-Building and Legislation.

==== Legislation issuing ====
As MP and Chairman of the Legislation Committee, Krasheninnikov was instrumental in development of the Civil Code, the Housing Code, the Civil Procedure Code, the Criminal Procedure Code, the Arbitral Procedure Code and other significant codes and laws. He was also responsible for the transfer of the penal enforcement system from the Ministry of Internal Affairs to the Ministry of Justice and participated in the establishment of the Federal Bailiff Service and the Federal Service for State Registration, Cadastre and Cartography. He was involved in the design of the new sign for the Russian ruble, among other initiatives. In 2006, he initiated the simplified privatization procedure of dacha allotments (so-called "dacha amnesty"). Krasheninnikov is also considered law draftsman responsible for introducing testamentary foundation, testamentary contract, and spouses' joint will into the Russian legal order.

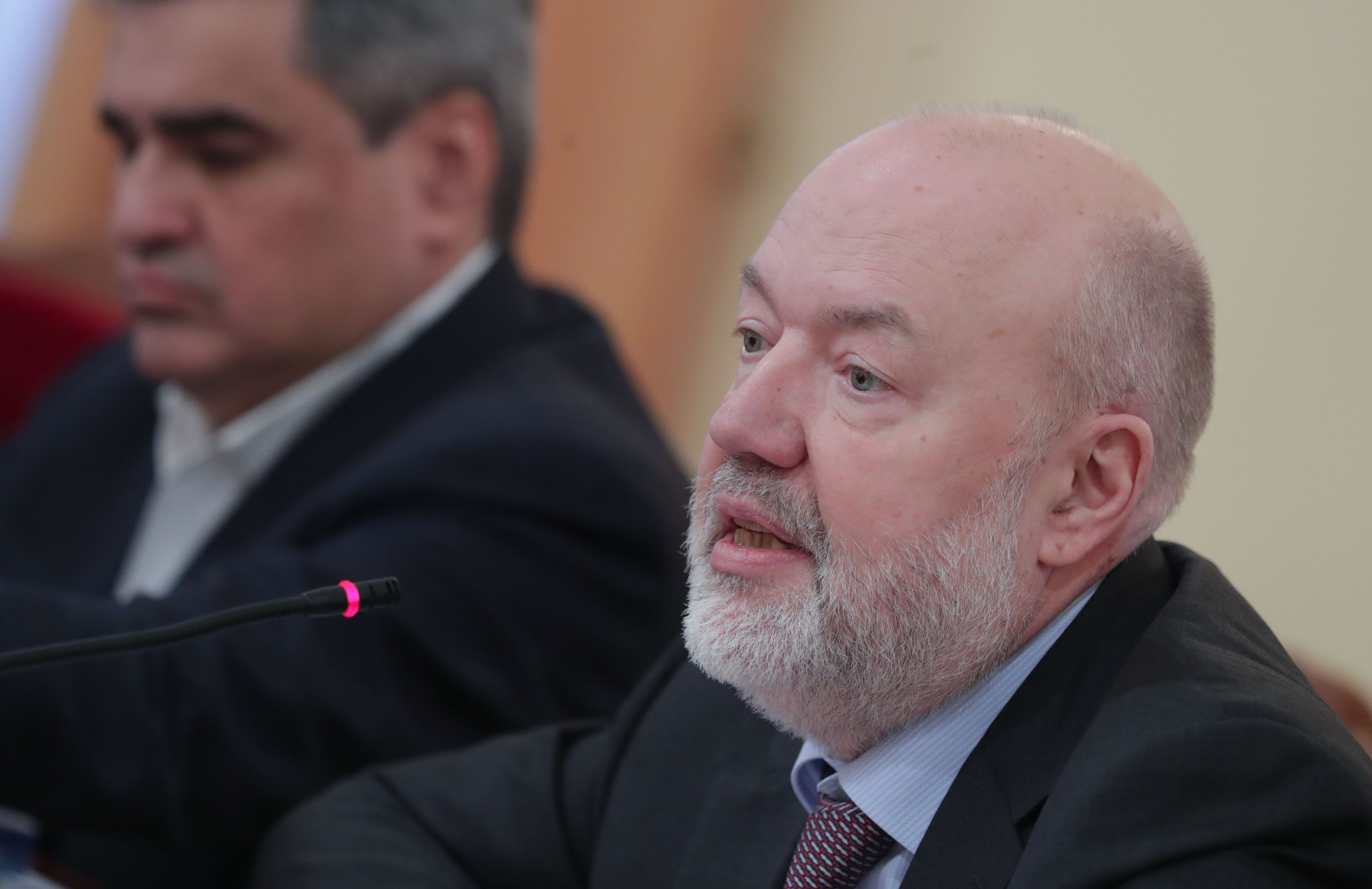
Krasheninnikov during the New People roundtable discussion on changes in legislation devoted to fighting torture in Russia, 2022

Another new law drafted by Krasheninnikov was the "A Day for a Day and a Half", which introduced coefficients for the recalculation of prison sentences, taking into account the time spent in pre-trial detention centers and the type of correctional institution, has been implemented. Since 2018, a day in detention center is counted as 1.5 days in a general-regime colony, 2 days in a colony-settlement, and 1 day in a high-security prison. The law went into effect on 14 July 2018, and was retroactive, resulting in the revision of sentences for more than 100,000 convicted individuals.

In 2020, Krasheninnikov was appointed co-chairman (along with Senator Andrey Klishas and academician Taliya Habrieva) of the working group on the preparation of proposals for amendments to the Constitution of Russia.

In 2021, Krasheninnikov and Klishas introduced a law to harmonize regional authorities across all federal subjects of Russia, which has expanded the grounds for removing governors who have lost the confidence of the President and has removed the federal ban on governors holding office for more than two consecutive terms.

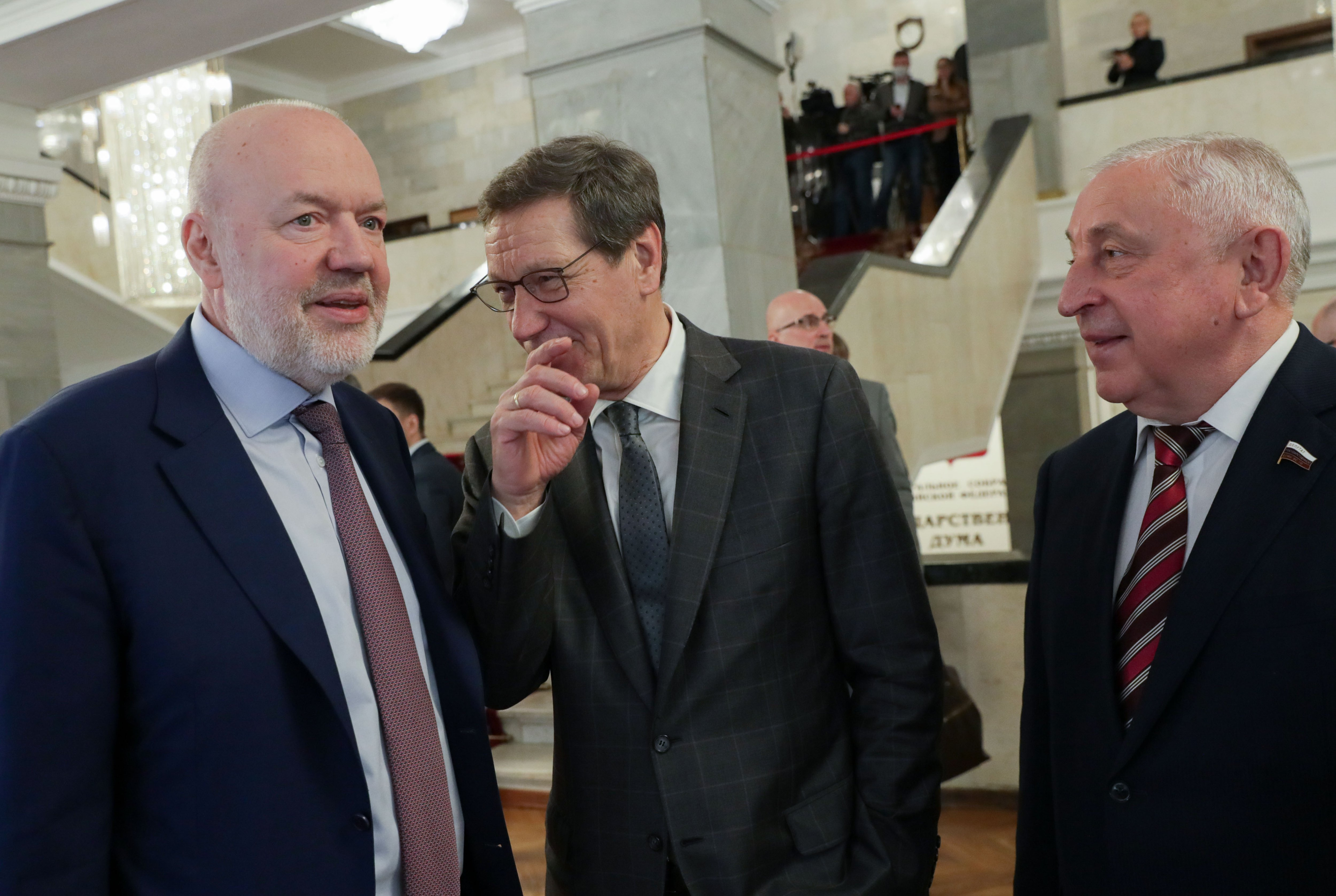
Krasheninnikov with fellow members of the State Duma Alexander Zhukov and Nikolay Kharitonov, 2022

In 2022, against the backdrop of the Russian invasion of Ukraine, Krasheninnikov, Klishas, and Irina Pankina proposed a law that would exempt certain categories of convicted individuals and those who have committed minor or moderate crimes from punishment if they join the military during times of mobilization, martial law, or wartime.

== Sanctions ==
Krasheninnikov is subject to sanctions imposed by Australia, Canada, the European Union, France, Japan, New Zealand, Switzerland, the United Kingdom and the United States in relation to the Russo-Ukrainian war.

== Awards ==
- Honorary Citizen of Sverdlovsk Oblast
- Lawyer of the Year Award in the Legal Education nomination (2019)
- P. A. Stolypin Medal, II class (2017).
- Order "For Merit to the Fatherland", III class (2014)
- Honorary Citizen of Chelyabinsk Oblast (2014)
- Honorary Doctor of the Yaroslav-the-Wise Novgorod State University (2013)
- Russian Federation Governmental Certificate of Honour (2011)
- Russian Federation Presidential Certificate of Honour (2008)
- Order "For Merit to the Fatherland", IV class (2007)
- Honoured Lawyer of Russia (2007)
- Order of Friendship (2003)
- Honorary Citizen of Magnitogorsk (1999)
- Medal of Anatoly Koni (1994)

== Family ==
Pavel Krasheninnikov is married, her name is Ekaterina. They have a son and a daughter.

== References and notes ==
Political offices
Preceded by Sergei Stepashin	Justice Minister of Russia; 1998 - 1999	Succeeded by Yury Chaika
