= Moscow City University =

Public research university in Moscow, Russia

- Московский городской педагогический университет
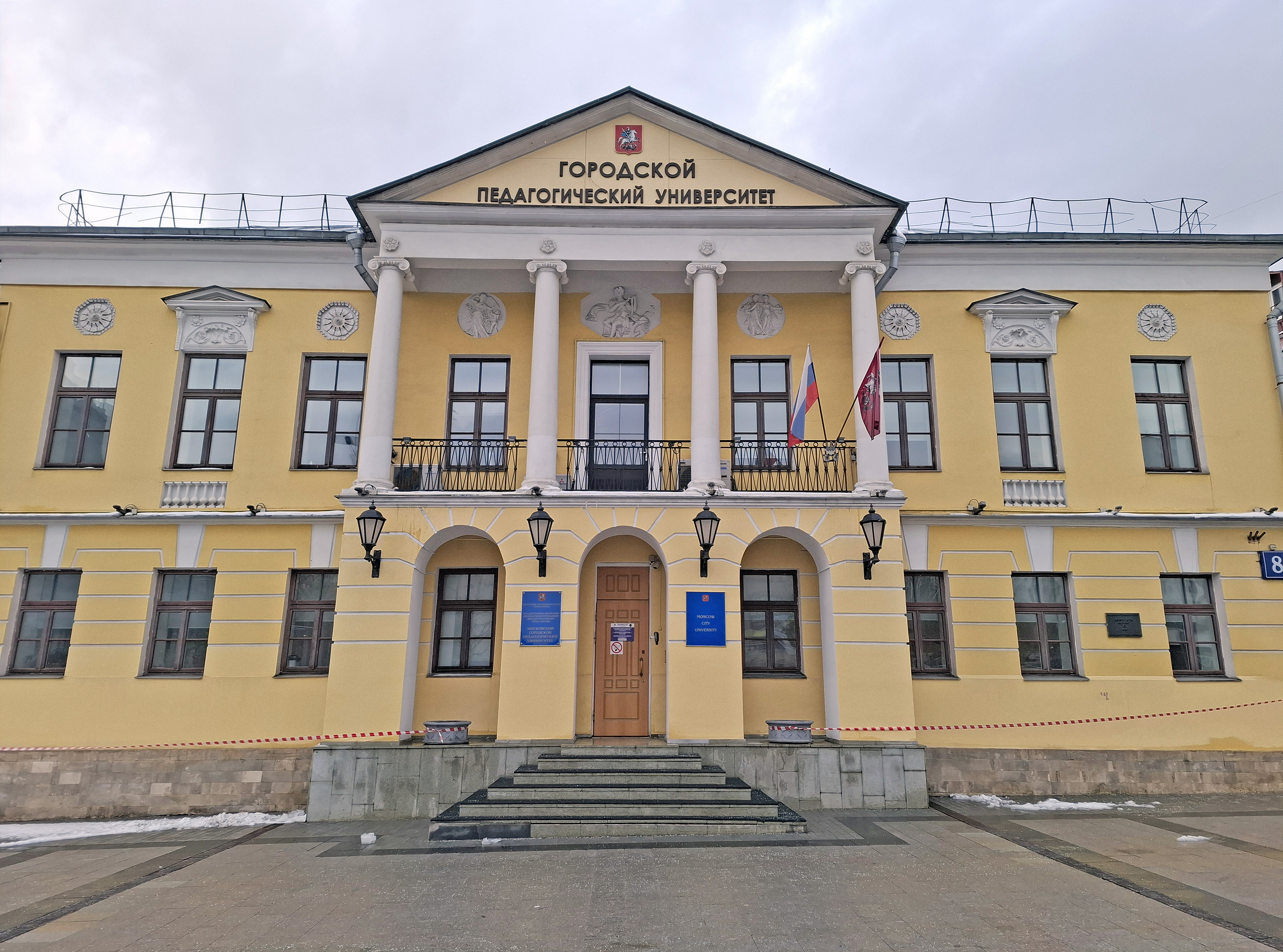
- Type: Public research university
- Established: 1 March 1995; 31 years ago
- Endowment: ₽23 million (US$222 thousand) (as of 16 January 2025)
- President: Viktor Ryabov
- Rector: Igor Remorenko
- Students: 12,804
- Location: 4 2nd Selskohoziajstvenny proezd, 129226, Moscow, Russia; 55°50′01″N 37°38′37″E
- Campus: Urban
- Language: Russian
- Colours: Red; Dark Gray; Gray
- Website: www.en.mgpu.ru

University rankings

Global – Overall
- QS World: 1401+ (2025)

Regional – Overall
- QS Emerging Europe and Central Asia: 301-350 (2022)

The Moscow City University (Russian: Московский городской педагогический университет) (MCU) is a public research university located in Moscow, Russia. It was founded in 1995.

Moscow City University is a metropolitan center for science, education and culture. Launched as a university specialized in education science, today MCU is a cross-disciplinary hub for developing human resources with extensive expertise. In 2025, MCU will mark its 30th anniversary.

MCU offers more than 300 Bachelor's and Master’s degree programs in such study fields as Education Science, Foreign Languages, Psychology, Social Studies, Law, Economics, Management, Computer Science, Sports, Arts and Music, Design, and others.

MCU has about 13,000 students and 800 academics for teaching and research, supported by facilities and classrooms.

== History ==
In 1993, the Moscow Department of Education proposed to the Russian Ministry of Education a project to create a pedagogical university on the basis of several departments of the Moscow State University for the Humanities. The university was founded on March 1, 1995, by decision of the Moscow Government. The creation of a new pedagogical university was received in two ways: by ordinary Muscovites and by government agencies.

During the first year 1300 students were enrolled to 8 faculties (History and Philology were the first ones) with 17 specialities and 3 forms of studies. Soon the Faculties became 12. Since 1995, the Moscow City University has a post-graduate department, and since 1996 a doctoral department. In 1997, the Samara Branch of the Moscow City University was opened.

In 2006 the Institute of Foreign Languages was opened, based on the Department of English Philology and the Department of Romance and Germanic Philology. In 2010, the Institute of Humanities was created on the basis of the Faculty of History and Philology of Moscow State Pedagogical University. In 2014, the Institute of Culture and Arts was established.

In 2012, the Moscow Humanitarian Pedagogical Institute (MGPU) joined the university, and in 2013, the Moscow State Academy of Business Administration (MGADA) joined the university. In 2014, 10 teacher training colleges became part of Moscow City University. In 2015, the colleges merged into the K.D. Ushinsky Institute for Secondary Vocational Education. In 2019, the Institute creates a laboratory of adolescent development.

The university has about 13,000 students. The university does not have a single complex of buildings, all of its institutes are located in different locations in Moscow and the Moscow region.

== Structure ==
- Institute of Humanities
- Institute of Natural Science and Sports Technologies
- Institute of Economics, Management and Law
- Institute of Psychology and Comprehensive Rehabilitation
- Institute of Secondary Vocational Education
- Institute of Pedagogy and Psychology of Education named after K.D. Ushinsky
- Institute of Culture and Arts
- Institute of Foreign Languages
- Institute of Lifelong Learning
- Institute for Digital Education
- Institute of Education Content, Methods and Technology
- Research Institute of Urban Studies and Global Education

== Academic reputation ==
Moscow City University was ranked #36th by the RAEX Russia's Best Universities Ranking 2024, #50th by the Forbes Russia's Best Universities Ranking 2024, #1401+ by QS World University Rankings 2025.

== Partner universities ==
- Abkhazian State University, Abkhazia
- Baku Slavic University, Azerbaijan
- (Armenia)
1. Khachatur Abovian Armenian State Pedagogical University, Armenia
2. Yerevan State University, Armenia
- (Belarus)
1. Maksim Tank Belarusian State Pedagogical University, Belarus
2. Francisk Skorina Gomel State University, Belarus
3. Mogilev State A. Kuleshov University, Belarus
4. Yanka Kupala State University of Grodno, Belarus
5. Vitebsk State University, Belarus
6. Mogilev State Regional Institute of Educational Development, Belarus
7. Minsk State Linguistic University, Belarus
8. Belarusian State University of Physical Culture, Belarus
9. National Institute for Higher Education, Belarus
10. Belarus State Economic University, Belarus
11. Belarusian State University, Belarus
12. Mozyr State Pedagogical University, Belarus
13. Baranavichy State University, Belarus
14. Institute of Sociology of the National Academy of Sciences of Belarus, Belarus
15. Minsk City Institute for the Development of Education, Belarus
16. Republican Institute for Vocational Education, Belarus
- Partap College of Education, India
- (Kazakhstan)
1. Korkyt Ata Kyzylorda University, Kazakhstan
2. Abai Kazakh National Pedagogical University, Kazakhstan
3. South Kazakhstan Pedagogical University named after Ozbekali Zhanibekov, Kazakhstan
4. L. N. Gumilev Eurasian National University, Kazakhstan
5. M. O. Auezov South Kazakhstan State University, Kazakhstan
6. Institute of Early Childhood Development, Kazakhstan
7. Kazakh National Women's Teacher Training University, Kazakhstan
8. Sarsen Amanzholov East Kazakhstan University, Kazakhstan
9. EdCrunch Academy, Kazakhstan
10. Toraighyrov University, Kazakhstan
- (Kyrgyzstan)
1. Kyrgyz State Academy of Physical Culture and Sports, Kyrgyzstan
2. Kyrgyz State University named after I. Arabaev, Kyrgyzstan
3. Kyrgyz-Russian Slavic University named after Boris Yeltsin, Kyrgyzstan
4. Kyrgyz National University, Kyrgyzstan
5. Kyrgyz-Turkish Manas University, Kyrgyzstan

== See also ==
- Education in Russia
- List of universities in Russia
- List of law schools in Russia
