= Civic Chamber of the Russian Federation =

Institution in Russia

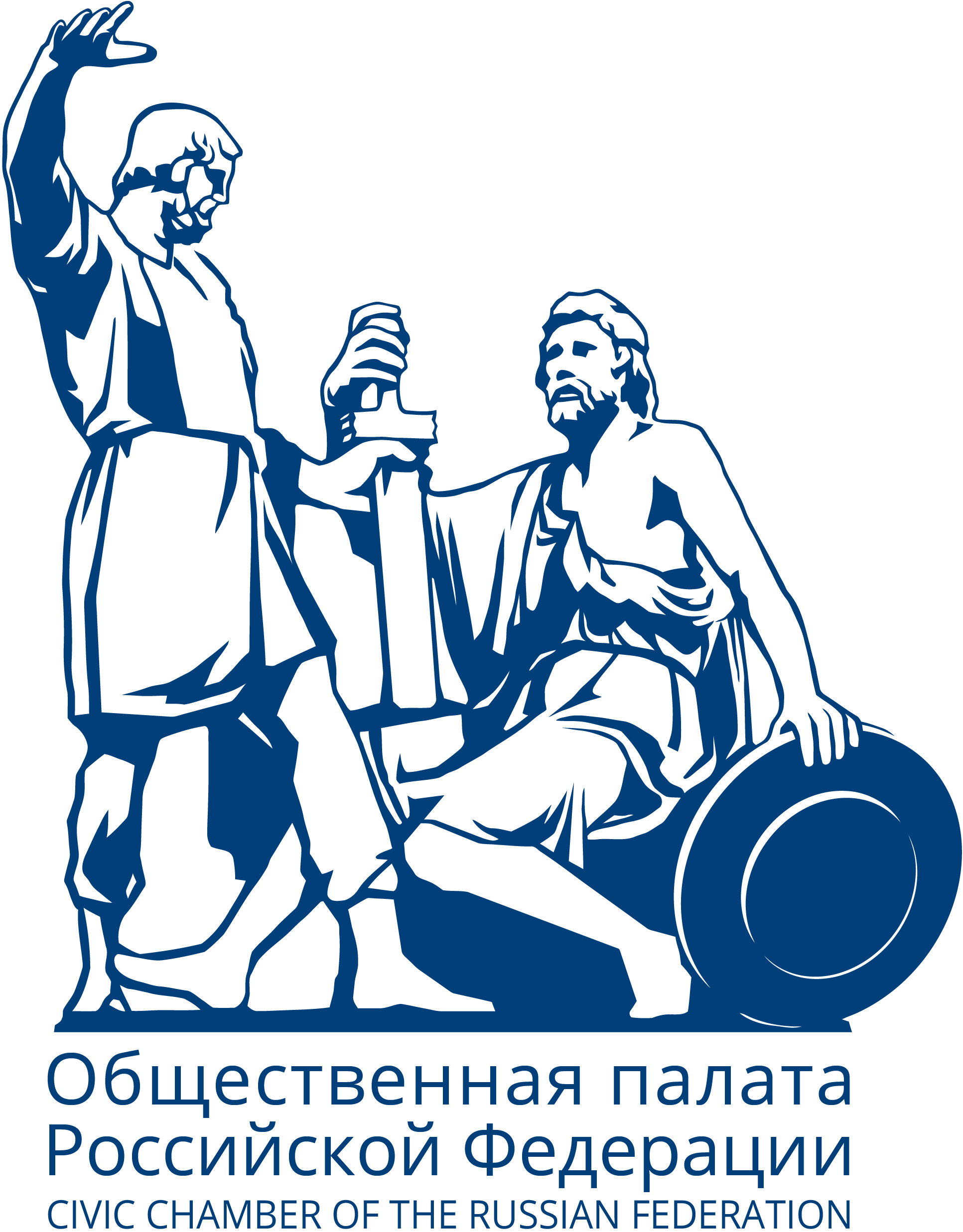

The Civic Chamber of the Russian Federation (Russian: Общественная палата Российской Федерации), sometimes shortened to Civic Chamber (Russian: Общественная палата), is a consultative civil society institution with 168 members created in 2005 in Russia to analyze draft legislation and monitor the activities of the parliament, government, and other government bodies of Russia and its Federal Subjects. It has a role similar to an oversight committee and has consultative powers. A convocation of the chamber is in power for a three-year term. The secretary of the chamber is Lidiya Mikheyeva since 2019.

== Creation of the Chamber ==
The creation of the chamber was suggested by Vladimir Putin, President of Russia, on September 13, 2004.

The Civic Chamber was organized according to the federal law On the Civic Chamber of the Russian Federation (Full text in Russian: ), that had been approved by the State Duma on March 16, by the Federation Council of Russia on March 23, had been signed by the President on April 4, had been published on April 7, and had come into force on July 1, 2005.

=== Members appointment ===
According to the Article 6 of the law the President appoints 42 members of the chamber who are supposed to have distinguished merit for the state and society.. On September 30, 2005 the said group was appointed by Vladimir Putin.

On November 15, 2005, the second half of the Chamber was convened as the first 42 members had elected 42 more deputies from All-Russia public associations. On December 23, 2005, these 84 members in turn elected 42 representatives of regional and interregional public associations (List of the members of the Civic Chamber in Russian: ). To qualify for the procedures, public associations had to be registered as such at least a year before July 1, 2005.

The first session of the chamber commenced working on January 22, 2006. The chamber has been headed by Evgeny Velikhov, Secretary of the Civic Chamber. He is a physicist, and a member of the Russian Academy of Sciences.

== Overview ==
According to the Federal Law ‘On the Civic Chamber of the Russian Federation’ the purpose of the Civic Chamber is to help citizens interact with government officials and local authorities in order to take into account the needs and interests of citizens, to protect their rights and freedoms in the process of shaping and implementing state policies, and to exercise public control over the activities of executive authorities.

The Civic Chamber comprises prominent citizens of Russia, representatives of national, regional and interregional NGOs.

The Federal Law from July 23, 2013 established a new formation procedure of the Civic Chamber. The fifth convocation (2014-2017) consists of 166 members, representing three equally important groups:

- 40 citizens approved by an executive order of the President of the Russian Federation;
- 83 representatives from regional civic chambers;
- 43 representatives from national public associations.

To reach the set goals and objectives the Civic Chamber holds expert examinations of draft federal constitutional laws, draft federal laws, draft laws, and regulations of the Government of the Russian Federation, constituent entities of the Russian Federation, and local self-government bodies. The Civic Chamber issues opinions on a variety of subjects to authorities, thus acting as a bridge between the RF's decision-making institutions and RF citizens.

Decisions of the Civic Chamber are of a recommendatory nature and are passed in the form of conclusions, proposals, and appeals. The forms of work are as follows: civil forums, public hearings, workshops, hot lines, citizens’ appeals, etc. The most important issues concerning the development of civil society and the country at large are usually considered during plenary sessions, with all members of the Civic Chamber taking part in them.

There are 4 plenary sessions a year. During the first plenary session the Chamber elects its President, Vice Presidents for three-year terms and appoints commissions and inter commission working groups focusing on various areas. The fifth convocation of the Civic Chamber consists of 18 commissions:

- Commission on Development of Information Community, Mass Media and Mass Communications
- Commission on Development of Small and Medium Businesses
- Commission on Investment Climate
- Commission on Public Control, Public Expert Examination, and Cooperation with Public Councils
- Commission on Public Security and Liaison with Public Watchdog Committees
- Commission on Ecology and Environment Protection
- Commission on Charity, Volunteerism and Promotion of Patriotism
- Commission on Development of the Real Sector of the Economy
- Commission on the Agricultural Sector and Development of Rural Areas
- Commission on Harmonization of Interethnic and Inter-Confessional Relations
- Commission on Development of Public Diplomacy and Support of Russian Nationals Abroad
- Commission on the Healthcare, Physical Culture, and Promotion of Healthy Style of Life
- Commission on Social Support for Individuals and Quality of Life
- Commission on Development of Social Infrastructure and HPU
- Commission on Development of Science and Education
- Commission on Support of Family, Children, and Motherhood
- Commission on Culture
- Commission on Support of Youth Initiatives

Key results of commissions’ activities as well as general tendencies in socially important issues find reflection in annual Reports of the Civic Chamber on the state of civil society in the Russian Federation. The Report is usually adopted by the plenary session held in December.

The Council of the Civic Chamber is a permanent body formed to tackle urgent issues relating to the Chamber’s activity. It includes President, Honorary President, Vice-Presidents, and heads of all commissions. The Civic Chamber of Russia assists the formation and development of regional Civic Chambers.

== Public oversight ==
In 2008 there was implemented the Federal Law ‘On Public Oversight of Human Rights in Places of Detention and Assistance to Persons in Places of Detention’. In line with the Law the Civic Chamber coordinates the work on creation of public watchdog committees in the RF entities.

Adoption of the Federal Law ‘On Basic Principles of Public Oversight in the Russian Federation’ in July 2014 became a significant milestone and recognition of the Civic Chamber performance efficiency. The Federal Law establishes the legal framework for organising and carrying out public oversight, its goals and objectives, principles and forms, as well as procedures and methods for determining and disclosing its results.

The Law stipulates the right of citizens and public organisations to engage in carrying out public oversight, and sets forth subjects and objects of public oversight, their legal status, rights and responsibilities, and forms of cooperation. The Law enables Russian citizens to exercise their right to participate in managing state affairs, in accordance with the Constitution of the Russian Federation (Article 32).

Public oversight is being increasingly approached as a platform for dialogue between civil society and public authorities. By encouraging search for solution to social problems public oversight provides rise of both civil activism and social responsibility. Public councils within ministries and agencies are permanent advisory and consultative bodies of public oversight. They are designed to ensure cooperation between citizens of Russia and bodies of federal, regional and local power to take into account the requirements and interests of citizens, to protect their rights and freedoms in developing and implementing state policy. Public councils are aimed at monitoring activities of federal executive authorities, including public procurement.

Public councils have been established at 53 federal bodies of power (e.a. Federal Security Service, Ministry of Finance, Ministry of Internal Affairs). In 2015 the Civic Chamber and Russian Governmental Expert Council introduced a new procedure for establishment of councils, with 75% of public councils members to be nominated by the Civic Chamber of the Russian Federation and the rest 25% by the Russian Governmental Expert Council. Such proportion provides a reasonable balance between representatives of civic organisations and expert community.

Public expert examination is considered to be one of the key instruments of public oversight. According to the law, public expert examination is an analysis and assessment of acts and decisions made by central and local authorities, inspection of documentation with regard to compliance with legislation, human and civil rights and freedoms, rights and legitimate interests of non-governmental, non-profit organizations (NGOs and NPOs).

Over the past ten years the Civic Chamber examined more than 500 draft laws relating to various spheres – from state-building to family and childhood support. Most expert examinations contain proposals and additions to draft laws. As stated before, the Civic Chamber’s conclusions and proposals serve as recommendations.

In 2014 the Civic Chamber tried a new approach to expert examination - the so called ‘zero readings’ of draft normative legal acts as a part of improvement of lawmaking process. In other words, ‘zero readings’ mean public participation not only in the assessment of prepared draft documents, but also contribution to the creation of draft documents, i.e. discussion of conceptual basis, formulation of basic ideas.

‘Zero readings’ encourage open dialogue between civil society and authorities. Accepted by society, ‘zero readings’ became a regular fixture of the Civic Chamber. In 2014 there were held over 20 ‘zero readings’, taking part in which were experts in economic and social spheres. In 2015 the number has doubled, which is evidence of a demand for this initiative. To conclude, the examination activities of the Civic Chamber aim at accommodation of socially important interests of the RF citizens, NGOs, public and local authorities.

== Active citizens' forum "Community" ==
Active citizens' forum "Community" is a new successful practice of the Civic Chamber, launched in 2015. It is a communication platform for society, business, and authorities. From March to November 2015, regional-level Community forums took place in the nine federal districts, where participants discussed development of the non-profit sector in the regions, the biggest issues and possible solutions, and support for the most effective civic activeness practices. The best proposals were included in the annual report of the Civic Chamber on the state of civil society in the Russian Federation. In 2016, Community forums were expected to be held in all federal districts.

During the year, 3492 people took part in regional Community forums and 3500 people in the final Community forum held in Moscow on November 4 (National Unity Day). Forums are open for participation. There are no official invitations either for authorities or for members of Russian Civic Chamber and regional civic chambers, NGOs, society leaders and activists. All those willing to take part in the Forum are invited to apply online. In most regions local authorities demonstrated their willingness to hold a dialogue with civic activists.

Forums were also attended by federal and regional experts and practitioners in a variety of fields: public oversight, society-business-government interaction, fundraising, volunteerism and charity, informal communities, citizens' engagement, etc. Involvement of experts and society leaders enabled to provoke serious, at times heated discussions. Community forums are both search for opinion leaders and access to social mobility for civic activists and representatives of NGOs.

== International activities ==
The Civic Chamber promotes active cooperation with international community. Since 2005, over 25 memorandums and agreements on cooperation with civil society institutions of different countries have been signed. Besides, in 2006 the Civic Chamber of Russia became member of the International Association of Economic and Social Councils and Similar Institutions (AICESIS). AICESIS was established in 1999. It is a unique organisation incorporating civil society institutions of 74 countries spanning four continents – Asia, Africa, Europe and America. Members of the Association are tripartite economic and social councils (government officials, employers and organised labor), civic chambers/councils and similar institutions operating at national level and empowered by a national constitutions, law or any other official act confirming their right to represent civil society and protect national economic and social security. In 2013 the Civic Chamber was elected President of the Association for a two-year term, which was recognition of maturity of Russian civil society. The main topic of Russian Chamber’s presidency was ‘National human capital and new sources of national competitiveness’. Interaction of the Civic Chamber with civil society institutions of different countries is based on the following principles:

- joint efforts to promote relations and mutual understanding between peoples;
- support of generally accepted principles and norms of international law to maintain international peace and security;
- promotion of economic relations;
- promotion of cultural and educational exchanges.

In 2012 within the Civic Chamber there was established Russian Public Council for International Cooperation and Public Diplomacy (hereinafter Council), an expert/consultative body on the Russian foreign policy composed of more than 40 prominent representatives of the non-profit sector and expert community taking active part in international programs and studies. In the majority of cases, resolutions and recommendations reflecting the consolidated position of the leading civil society institutes on the subjects considered were adopted at the end of the meetings; those were later on sent to field-specific bodies of the state authorities.

== Members of the Fifth Convocation (2014–2017) ==
- Ivan Abazher
- Valentin Agarkov
- Leila Amerkhanova
- Vladimir Andreychenko
- Kirill Androsov
- Igor Archbishop of Abakan and Khakassia Ionaphan (Tsvetkov)
- Eduard Babrashev
- Dmitry Badovsky
- Sergey Bagnenko
- Andrey Balzhirov
- Igor Batishchev
- Valery Biryukov
- Dmitry Biryukov
- Yelena Blashchuk
- Vyacheslav Bocharov
- Marina Bogoslovskaya
- Leo Bokeria
- Alexander Boroda
- Leonid Borodin
- Alexander Borzhko
- Alexander Brechalov
- Lidia Budchenko
- Vladimir Bulatov
- Irina Burmykina
- Alexandr Butuzov
- Vsevolod Chaplin
- Viktor Cherepov
- Sergey Chernin
- Vsevolod Chernov
- Alexandr Chislov
- Vadim Chubarov
- Dmitry Chugunov
- Nikolai Daikhes
- Olga Danilova
- Andrey Dementyev
- Nina Dergunova
- Olga Deyeva
- Iosif Diskin
- Roman Doshchinsky
- Nikolay Drozdov
- Lyubov Dukhanina
- Sergey Fakhretdinov
- Georgy Fedorov
- Vladimir Fisinin
- Rawil Ğaynetdin
- Shamil Gantsev
- Eduard Gavrilov
- Viktor Grachyov
- Natalya Gramolina
- Vladislav Grib
- Maxim Grigoriev
- Dmitry Grigorovich
- Sergey Grigoryev
- Diana Gurtskaya
- Vyacheslav Gvozdev
- (Sergey Pologrudov) Ignaty, Metropolitan of Khabarovsk and Priamurie
- Oleg Kalinsky
- Sergey Kashnikov
- Evgeny Kazantsev
- Magomed Khadzhimuratov
- Alexander Khamidullin
- Sultan Khamzayev
- Artyom Kiryanov
- Andrey Klemeshev
- Tatyana Klimenko
- Maria Komarova
- Vyacheslav Korepanov
- Mikhail Kornev
- Valery Korovin
- Igor Korovkin
- Olga Kostina
- Andrey Kovalchuk
- Vladimir Kovalchuk
- Veronika Krasheninnikova
- Albert Krganov
- Anatoly Kucherena
- Zaur Kuchiyev
- Yaroslav Kuzminov
- Vladimir R. Legoyda
- Mikhail Lermontov
- Dmitry Leskin
- Elvira Lifanova
- Larisa Litvinyuk
- Aigun Magomedov
- Galina Makashina
- Stepan Maltsev
- Takhir Mamedov
- Sergei Markov
- Iskhak Mashbash
- Yelena Migunova
- Lidiya Mikheyeva
- Irina Minkh
- Ivan Mokhnachuk
- Andrey Molchanov
- Lev Mukhlayev
- Alexander Muzykantsky
- Zaurbi Nakhushev
- Nikolay Naumenko
- Vladimir Neroyev
- Bogdan Novorok
- Vladimir Okrepilov
- Sergei Ordzhonikidze
- Pyotr Orlov
- Nickolay Ostarkov
- Svetlana Parshkova
- Inna Parshutina
- Nikolay Pashtayev
- Tatyana Pastukhova
- Alexandr Pelin
- Olga Poletilo
- Oleg Polukhin
- Yury Polyakov
- Galina Polyanskaya
- Kristina Potupchik
- Mikhail Prudnikov
- Konstantin Raikin
- Andrey Razbrodin
- Aleksey Repik
- Yelena Reutskaya
- Mikhail Rudnev
- Sergey Rudov
- Alexander Rusakov
- Sergey Ryakhosky
- Denis Ryzhy
- Dmitry Sazonov
- Eugeny Semenyako
- Valery Serov
- Irina Skvortsova
- Yelena Shapkina
- Vladimir Shaposhnikov
- Konstantin Shavrin
- Sergey Shchetinin
- Lyubov Shevlyakova
- Alexander Shipulin
- Alexander Sholokhov
- Igor Shpektor
- Vladimir Shuglya
- Irina Skvortsova
- Vladimir Slepak
- Irina Sorokina
- Nikolay Strelkov
- Andrey Suknev
- Maksim Surayev
- Elena Sutormina
- Pavel Sychev
- Zurab Tsereteli
- Sangadji Tarbaev
- Aleksey Tishchenko
- Azamat Tlisov
- Yelena Topoleva-Soldunova
- Andrey Tsarev
- Vladimir Tsukanov
- Anton Tsvetkov
- Yevgenia Uvarkina
- Valery Vasiliev
- Natalya Vavilova
- Lidia Velezheva
- Evgeny Velikhov
- Vladimir Vinnitsky
- Lyudmila Vinogradova
- Vladimir Vlasov
- Victor Vlasov
- Svetlana Yaremchuk
- Natalya Yepikhina
- Viktor Yermakov
- Olga Yezhkova
- Tatyana Zabegina
- Viktor Zabolotsky
- Andrey Zaitsev
- Konstantin Zatulin
- Yulia Zimova
- Andrey Zverev

== See also ==
- Competition #Discover Russia
- Category:Members of the Civic Chamber of the Russian Federation

== Literature ==
- Nadja Douglas: Public Control of Armed Forces in the Russian Federation. — Springer, 2017. — PP. 130–132. — 369 p. — ISBN 9783319563848.
- Saltanat Liebert, Stephen E. Condrey, Dmitry Goncharov: Public Administration in Post-Communist Countries. Former Soviet Union, Central and Eastern Europe, and Mongolia. — Routledge, 2017. — P. 29. — 379 p. — ISBN 9781351552691.
- Alfred B. Evans, Laura A. Henry, Lisa Sundstrom. Russian Civil Society. A Critical Assessment. — Routledge, 2016. — PP. 151–152. — 364 p. — ISBN 9781317460459.
