= Lidiya Mikheyeva =

- Лидия Михеева
- Miheeva in 2021

Secretary of the Civic Chamber of the Russian Federation
- Incumbent
- Assumed office 9 December 2019
- Preceded by: Valery Fadeyev

Personal details
- Born: 17 May 1971 (age 55) Barnaul, Soviet Union
- Education: Altai State University; All-Russian State University of Justice

Lidiya Yuryevna Mikheyeva (Russian: Лидия Юрьевна Михеева; born May 17, 1971, in Barnaul, RSFSR) is a Russian legal scholar, public figure, and jurist. Since December 9, 2019, she has served as the Secretary of the Civic Chamber of the Russian Federation. She holds a Doctor of Laws degree (2003), is a professor (2005), and is a Honored Jurist of the Russian Federation (2016). She also holds the rank of Active State Councilor of the Russian Federation, 3rd class. Mikheyeva heads the Russian School of Private Law and is a member of the Presidential Council for the Codification and Improvement of Civil Legislation. She serves on the Higher Examination Commission for judicial qualification exams and is a member of the dissertation council at Moscow State University. She has been involved in drafting several laws aimed at modernizing the Civil Code of the Russian Federation. Additionally, she serves on the scientific advisory boards of the Supreme Court of the Russian Federation and the Federal Notary Chamber.

== Biography ==
Born in Barnaul, Lidiya Mikheyeva graduated from the Faculty of Law at Altai State University in 1993. Over the following 13 years, she taught civil law and worked as a legal counsel for various commercial organizations. In 1998, she defended her Candidate of Sciences dissertation at Tomsk State University, and five years later, she earned her doctoral degree with a thesis focused on the legal regulation of guardianship and trusteeship. In 2003, she became a professor and subsequently the Head of the Department of Civil Law at the All-Russian State University of Justice. From 2006 to 2008, she worked at the Research Centre for Private Law under the President of the Russian Federation. From 2008 to 2010, she served in the State Duma Committee on Civil, Criminal, Arbitration, and Procedural Legislation, holding the position of Deputy Chief of Staff.

She holds the rank of State Counsellor of the Russian Federation, 3rd class.

She has been involved in drafting a number of federal laws, primarily in the field of civil legislation. In 2002, she developed a draft federal law "On Guardianship and Trusteeship," which was subsequently enacted as Federal Law No. 48-FZ of April 24, 2008, "On Guardianship and Trusteeship".

From 2010 to 2019, she served as Deputy Chair of the Council of the Russian School of Private Law under the President of Russia. Since 2019, she has served as Chair of the Council of the Research Centre for Private Law.

Since 2012, she has been a member of the joint working group tasked with developing and adopting Draft Federal Law No. 47538-6, "On Amendments to Parts One, Two, Three, and Four of the Civil Code of the Russian Federation and Certain Legislative Acts of the Russian Federation" (a bill concerning the modernization of the Civil Code). She also headed the working group for Draft Law No. 398234-6, "On the Notariat and Notarial Activities".

She is a member of the Council for the Codification and Improvement of Civil Legislation under the President of the Russian Federation. As a member of the Scientific Advisory Council to the Supreme Court of the Russian Federation, she participates in the development and discussion of draft resolutions for the Plenum of the Supreme Court of the Russian Federation. In 2014, she became a member of the Civic Chamber of the Russian Federation, appointed under the head of state’s quota (and reappointed in 2017), and was elected Deputy Secretary. She also served as Deputy Head of the working group on the formation of public councils attached to federal executive bodies. From 2014 to 2017, she chaired the Civic Chamber’s Scientific Advisory Council and served as Deputy Head of the working group responsible for the competitive selection of candidates for public councils attached to federal executive bodies.

By Decree of the President of the Russian Federation No. 572 dated October 26, 2016, Lidia Mikheeva was awarded the honorary title of "Honored Jurist of the Russian Federation". She received the award on January 27, 2017, in the Kremlin’s Catherine Hall.

During the 2018 presidential election, she served as an authorized representative for Vladimir Putin.

Since 2018, she has been a member of the working group on improving legislation regarding property rights, established under the Council for the Codification and Improvement of Civil Legislation.

On December 9, 2019, she was elected Secretary of the Civic Chamber of the Russian Federation, succeeding Valery Fadeev.
