= Pankin =

Pankin (Russian: Панкин) is a Russian masculine surname, its feminine counterpart is Pankina. It may refer to:

- Aleksandra Pankina (born 1972), Belarusian rower
- Boris Pankin (born 1931), former Soviet Minister of Foreign Affairs
- Irina Pankina (born 1986), Russian politician
- Ivanna S. Pankin (born Denise Grimes in 1969), American roller derby skater and organizer
- Natalia Pankina, Russian long-distance swimmer
- Nikolai Pankin (1949–2018) a former Soviet Olympic swimmer
- Stuart Pankin (born 1946) an American film and television actor.
