= List of law schools in Russia =

This is a list of main law schools in Russia in alphabetical order.

Russian law schools do not require attendees to have a bachelor's degree. For example, Vladimir Putin attended law school straight out of high school.

In Russia, the higher education is considered to be a higher education if only it was acquired at state or private institutions of higher education which had the state accreditation for particular speciality at the time of graduation. In addition, there is non-state professional-social accreditation of quality of directly legal education provided for in Decree of President of Russia of 26 May 2009, №599, which is carried out by Association of Lawyers of Russia (Ассоциация юристов России). However, as of 2020, the Association of Lawyers of Russia assessed only a small number of russian law schools. Also, there are many rankings done by private agencies.

- Academic Law University under the auspices of the Institute of State and Law, Russian Academy of Sciences
- Bashkir State University - Institute of Law
- Baikal State University of Economics and Law
- Chelyabinsk State University - Faculty of Law
- Finance University under the Government of the Russian Federation - Faculty of Law
- Higher School of Economics - Faculty of Law
- Institute of Legislation and Comparative Law
- Irkutsk State University - Faculty of Law
- Kazan Federal University - Faculty of Law
- Khabarovsk State Academy of Economics and Law
- Kutafin Moscow State Law University
- Moscow City University - Institute of Economics, Management and Law
- Moscow State Institute of International Relations - International Law School
- Moscow State University, Faculty of Law
- Novosibirsk State University - Institute for the Philosophy and Law
- Petrozavodsk State University - Faculty of Law
- Russian Peoples' Friendship University - Law Institute
- Russian Presidential Academy of National Economy and Public Administration – Institute of Law and National Security
- Russian State University for the Humanities - Faculty of Law
- Russian School of Private Law
- Ryazan State University - Faculty of Law
- Saint Petersburg State Polytechnical University - Faculty of Law
- Saint Petersburg State University, Faculty of Law
- Saratov State Academy of Law
- Siberian Law University
- Siberian Federal University - Institute of Law
- State University of Management - Institute of Public Administration and Law
- South Ural State University - Faculty of Law
- Tomsk State University - Institute of Law
- Tyumen State University - Faculty of Law
- Ural State Law University
- Voronezh State University - Faculty of Law

== See also ==
- Bachelor of Laws
