= Discover Russia =

- Russian: Узнай Россию
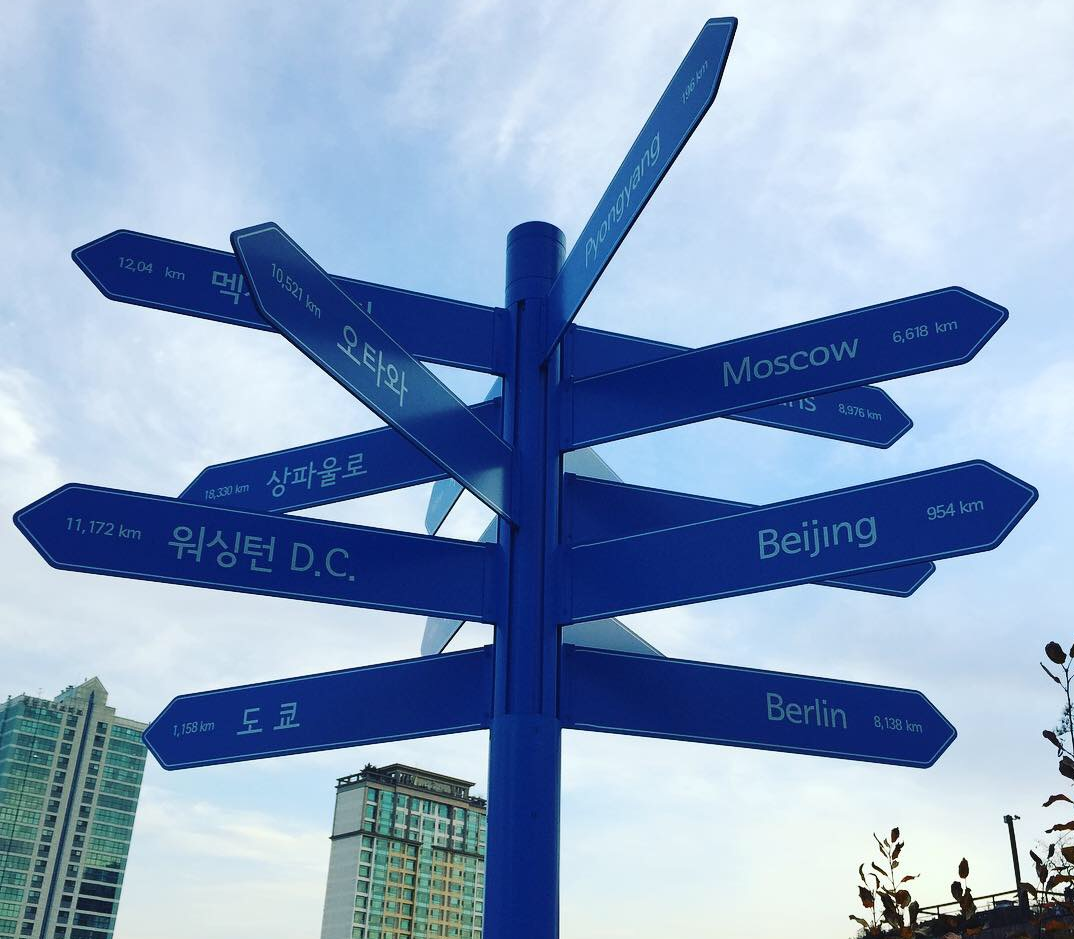
- Logo of the contest #Discover the World. Start with sister cities (2018–2019)
- Country: Russia
- Presented by: Wikimedia RU; Civic Chamber of the Russian Federation
- First award: June 3, 2013; 13 years ago
- Website: www.glory-gallery.ru/all-competitions

#Discover Russia (Russian: #Узнай Россию) is a series of contests in the Russian Wikipedia organized by the Association of Honorary Citizens and the foundation Wikimedia RU since 2013. The project is supported by the Civic Chamber of the Russian Federation. As of March 2019, 276 people took part in the competitions: they created and extended more than 18,700 Wikipedia articles. In December 2018, "Discover Russia" became the winner of the all-Russian contest Russian Volunteer as an educational project.
