= Cathedral in the name of Archangel Michael =

Belarusian orthodox church in Mazyr

Coordinates: 52°02′46″N 29°16′24″E

- Собор во имя Архистратига Михаила
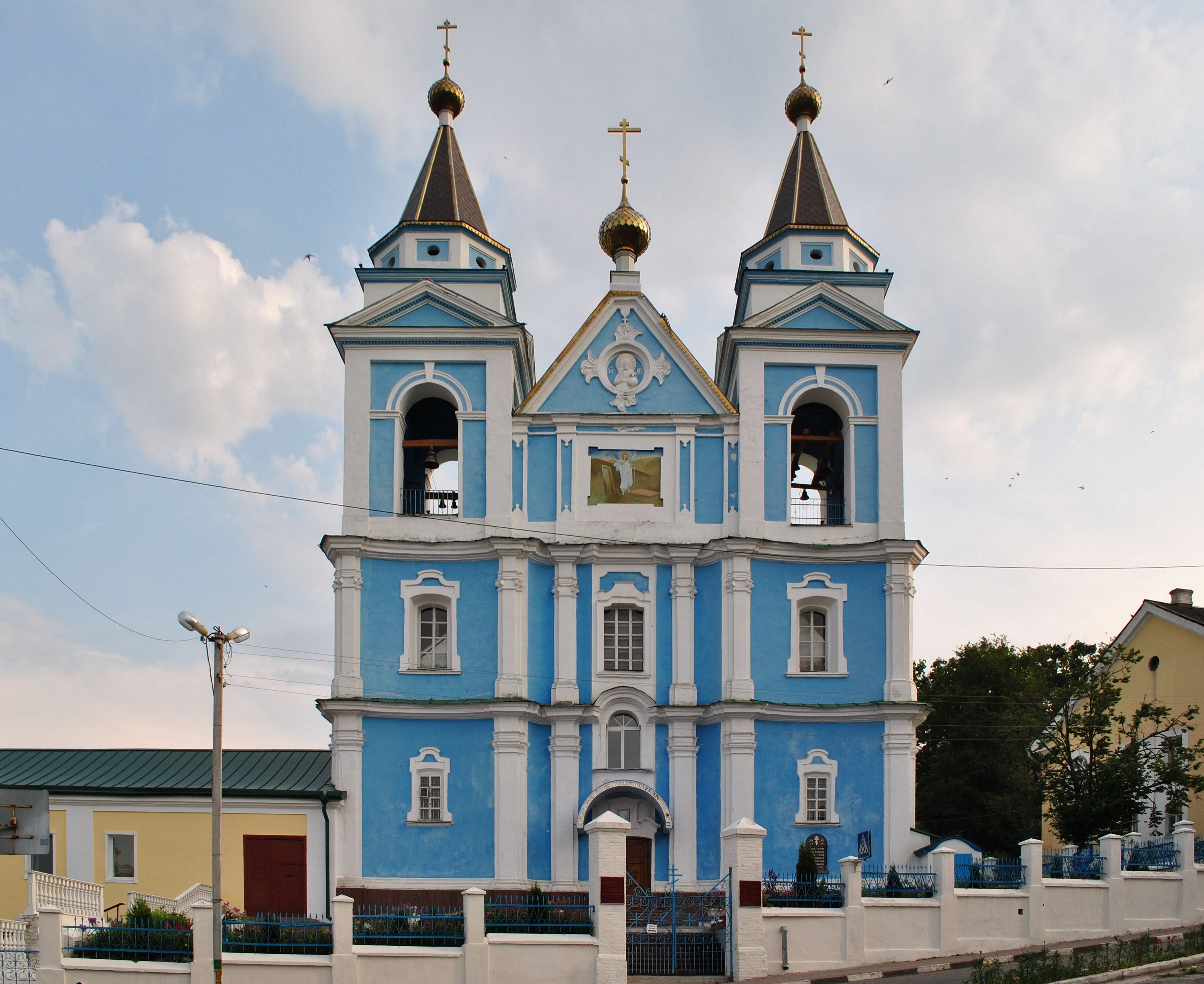
- Cathedral in the name of Archangel Michael
- Country: Belarus
- Denomination: Orthodox
- Previous denomination: Catholic

History
- Dedication: St Michael
- Dedicated: 1865-09-05

Architecture
- Style: Baroque
- Years built: 1745–1760 (1770)

The Archangel Michael's Cathedral is an Orthodox cathedral of the Eparchy of Turov located in Mazyr, Belarus. It was built in the 17th century as a Catholic church of Bernardine monastery in late Baroque style in the form of a two-towered three-nave basilica. In 1864 it was given to the Eastern Orthodox Church. From 1937 to 1941 it was used as an NKVD prison. The cathedral was reopened in 1952 and reconstructed in the 1980s and the 2010s.

== 17th–18th centuries ==
In 1615 the Bernardians were allowed by the King of Poland, Sigismund III Vasa, to establish a monastery in Mozyr. In 1618 local head Baltazar Stravinsky constructed a wooden church and some small houses for the monks. In 1645 retired Colonel Stephan Lozko donated the Bernardinians' lands in front of the Mazyr Castle and started the construction of the stone monastery. Only three years later, in 1648, during the war between peasants and the Cossacks, the monastery was destroyed. In the mid-17th century the wars almost wiped Mazyr off the map. The town was rebuilt by King John III Sobieski.

Thus the first mentions of the church refer to the 16th century. However, in the second half of the 18th century it was destroyed.

In 1745, Marszałek Kazimierz Oskierka started the construction of a new stone Bernardinian monastery that was planned to have a big church in its center. The exact period of construction is unknown. Most probably, the church was consecrated in the 1760s or in the 1770s. It was a three-nave basilica with two towers, decorated in baroque style. The Oskierks were buried in the crypt. The monastery also had a library and a primary school.

== 19th–20th centuries ==
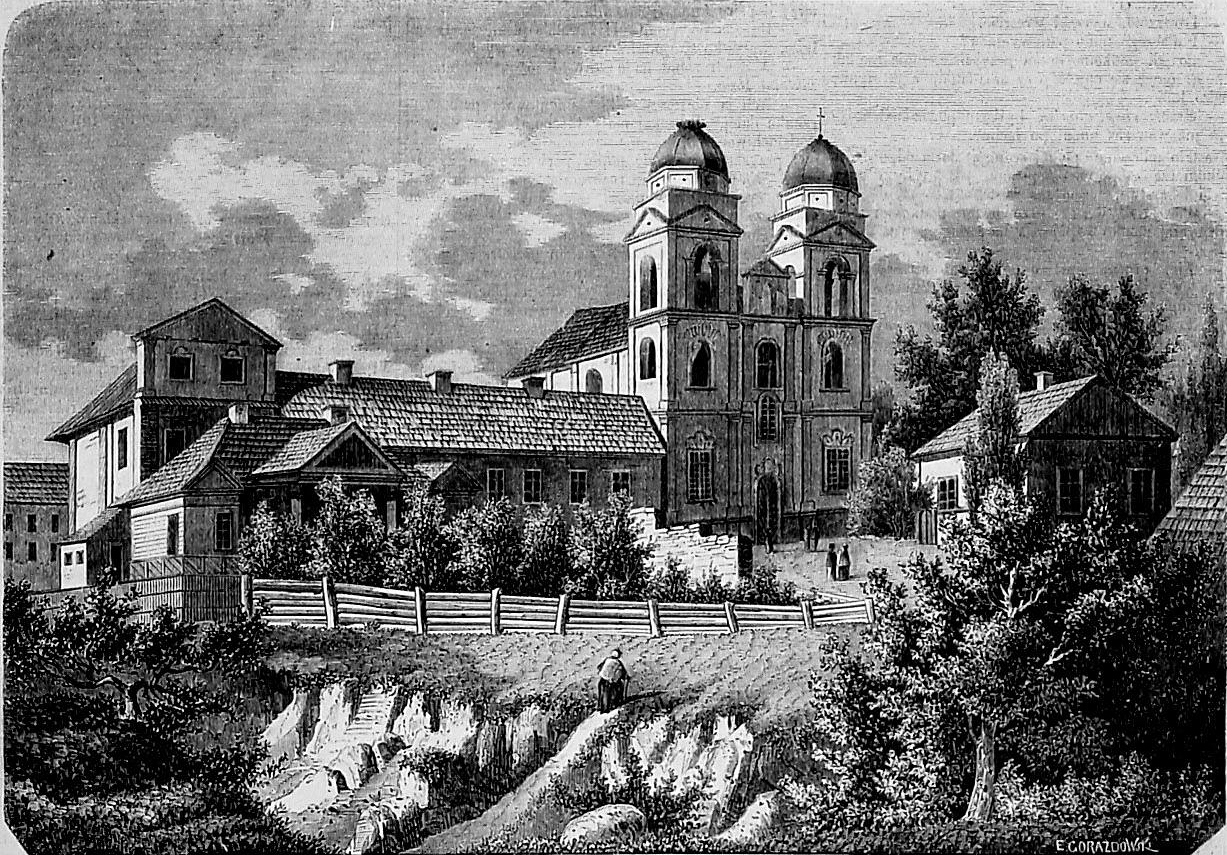
Bernardynski monastery and St Michael's church at Zamkavaja str. in Mozyr. Edward Gorazdowski, 1865

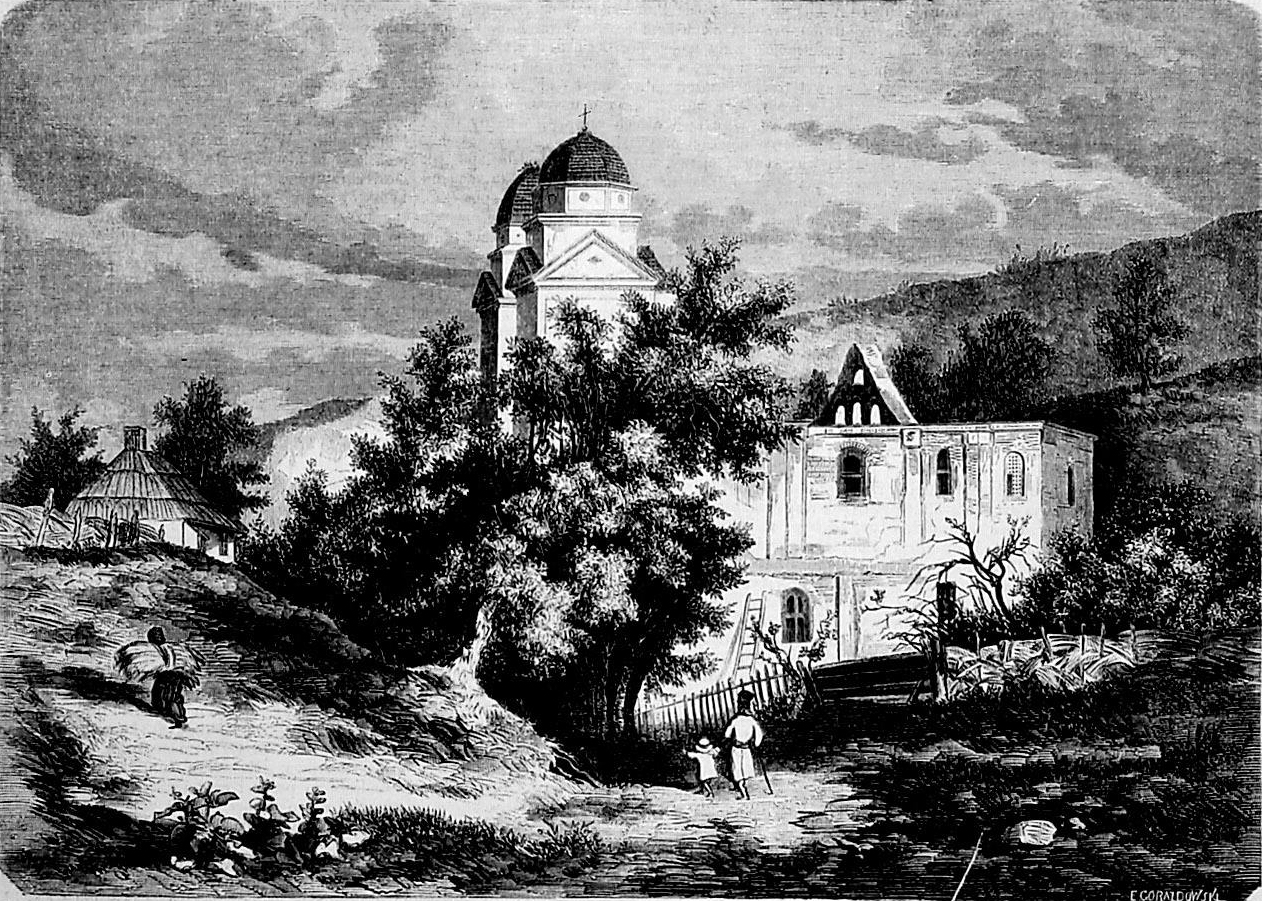
St Michael's church at Zamkavaja str. in Mozyr. Edward Gorazdowski, 1865

In 1832 the monastery was closed and all its buildings were given to the officials of the Mozyr region. After 1847 it was used as a hospital.

After the Partitions of Poland, Mozyr belonged to the Russian Empire. After the January Uprising (1863–1864), most all Catholic monasteries and many churches in modern Belarus and Ukraine were closed, so in 1864, the Mozyr Franciscan church was transferred to the Orthodox Church. Count Mikhail Muravyov-Vilensky donated significant sums for the reconstruction, and writer Ivan Aksakov assisted him in transferring the funds. The reconstructed church was consecrated on 5 September 1865 by Archbishop Michail of Mozyr.

From 1937 to 1941 the cathedral was turned into an NKVD prison for the Polesie region. Some sources claim that more than 2000 death sentences were issued here by the NKVD troikas. Bodies were buried in the basement and the bones covered in lime; skulls with gunshot wounds were discovered during research in 1993.

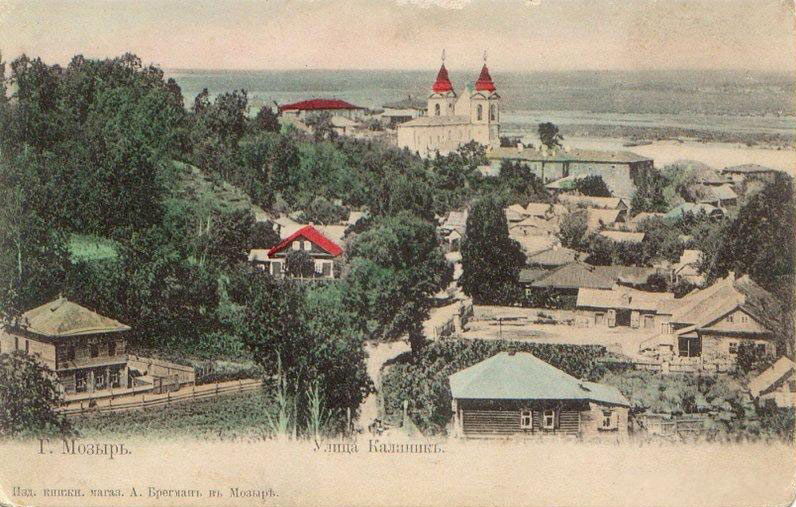
Mozyr in 1908

In 1941 the church was reopened, in 1952 it was officially registered by the Soviet authorities and reconstructed. In the 1980s the famous artist Alexander Isachev painted the frescoes in the cathedral.

== Nowadays ==
Since 1992, the church is a part of the restored Turovska Diocese. In the crypt, a new sanctuary has been established and dedicated to the innocent victims of the Stalinist repressions (Dekulakization, Cheka terror and the Great Purge). The crypt keeps the remnants of the killed. It was consecrated in 2012.

In 2018 the façades and the roof of the church were reconstructed.

== Sources ==
- Govorsky, K. (1865). Вестник Западной России. Историко-литературный журнал [Western Russia Messenger: Historic and Literary Magazine]. Vilnius: Romm Publishing House. p. 251.
