= Mazyr =

City in Gomel Region, Belarus

Mazyr Мазыр (Belarusian) Мозырь (Russian) Mozyr
- City
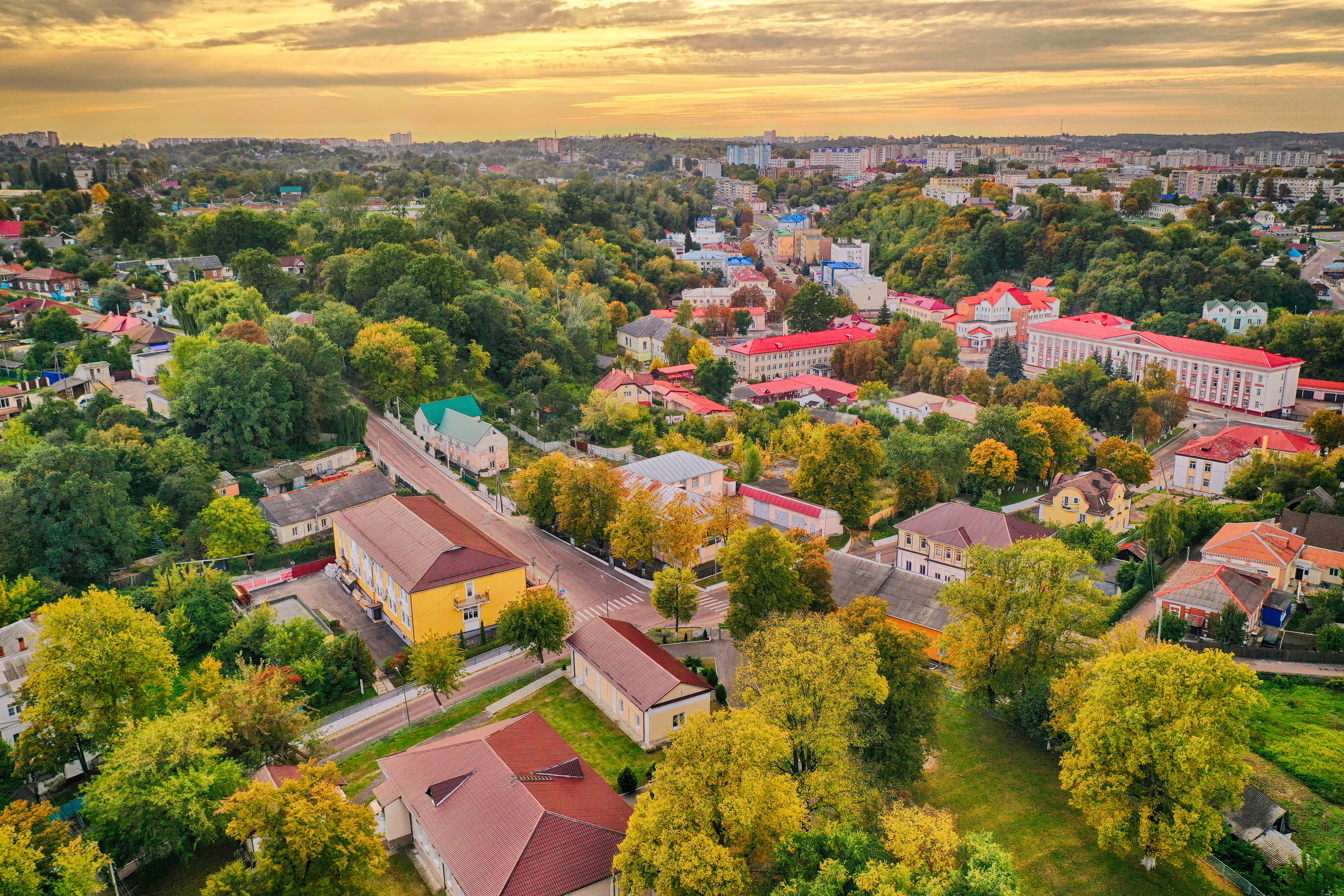
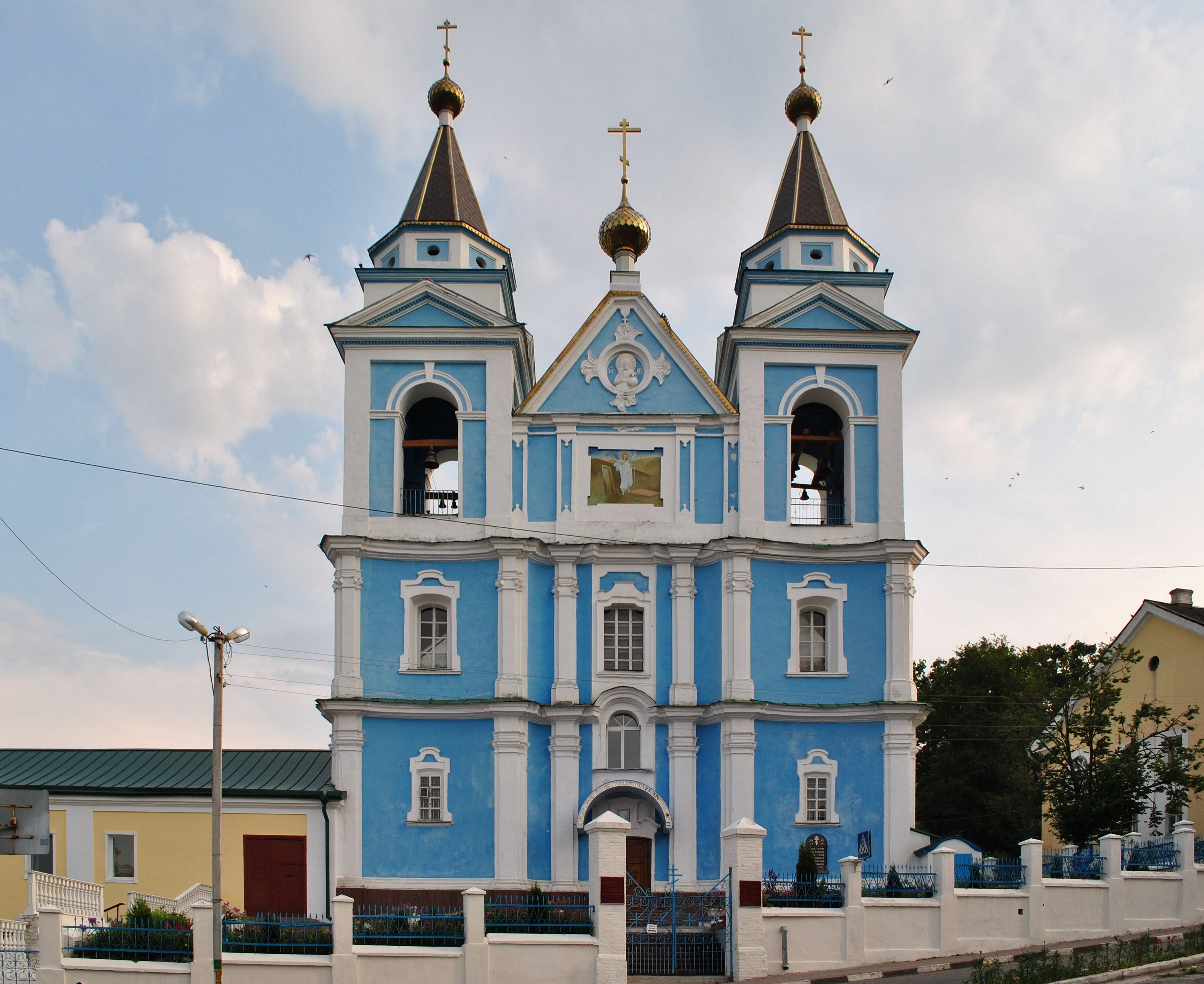
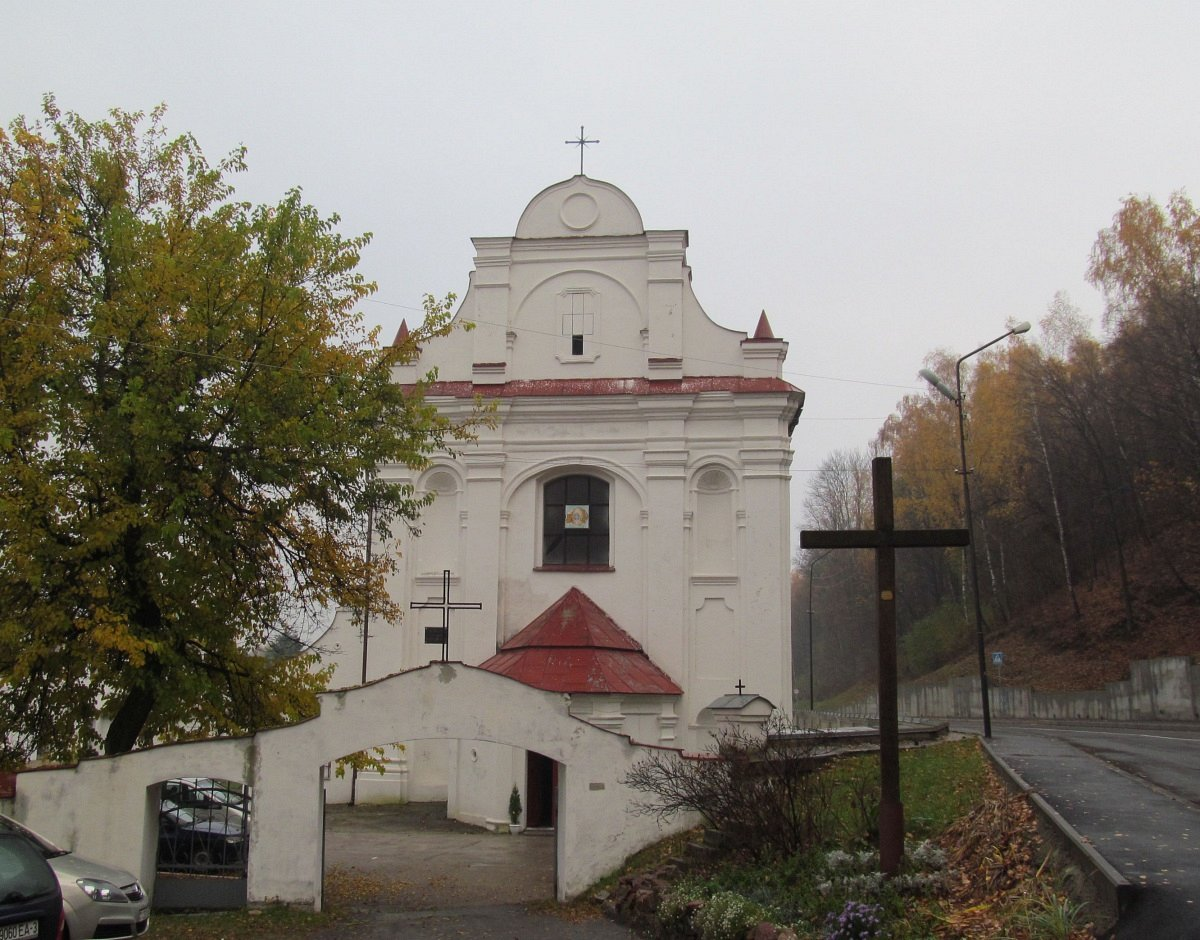
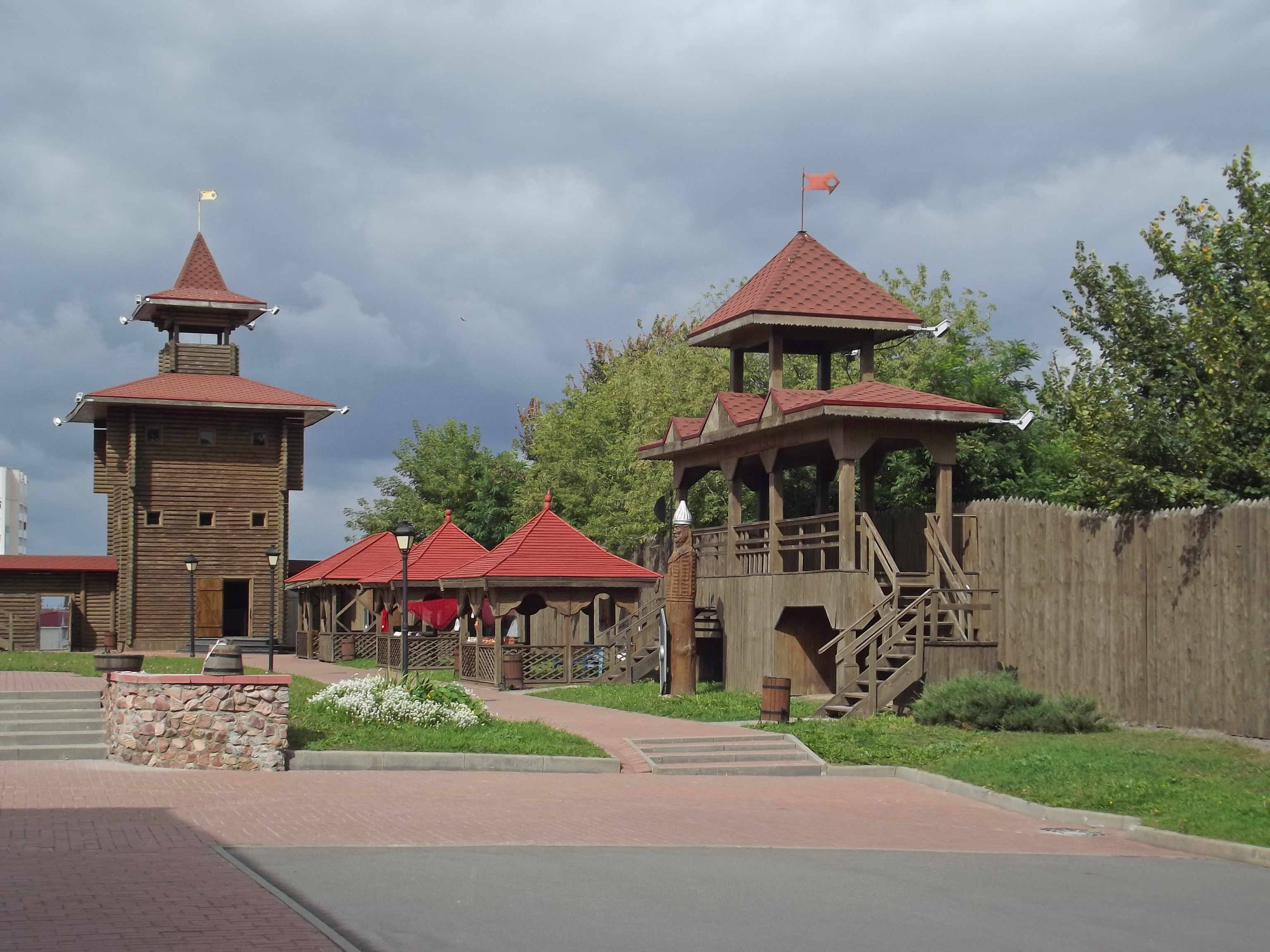
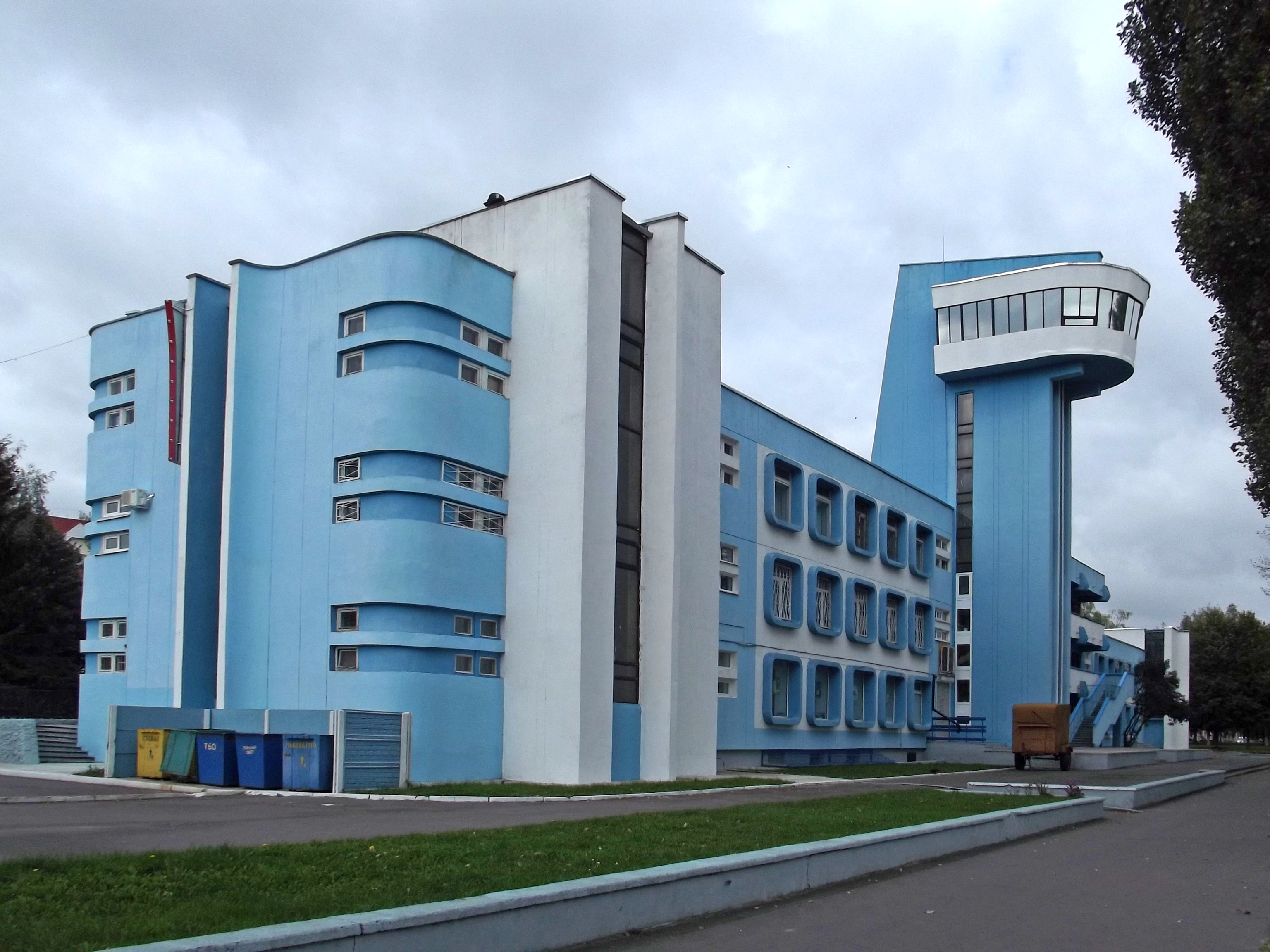
- Aerial view Saint Michael Archangel Cathedral Saint Michael Archangel church Castle River shipping company

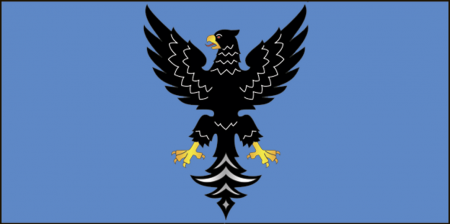
- Flag Coat of arms

- Location within Belarus
- Coordinates: 52°03′N 29°15′E
- Country: Belarus
- Region: Gomel Region
- District: Mazyr District
- First mentioned: 1155

Area
  - Total: 44.1381 km^{2} (17.0418 sq mi)
- Elevation: 160 m (520 ft)

Population (2024)
  - Total: 104,517
  - Density: 2,367.95/km^{2} (6,132.97/sq mi)
- Time zone: UTC+3 (MSK)
- Postal code: 247760
- Area code: +375 2363
- License plate: 3

Mazyr or Mozyr (Belarusian: Мазыр, IPA: [maˈzɨr]; Russian: Мозырь, IPA: [ˈmozɨrʲ]; Polish: Mozyrz; Yiddish: מאזיר) is a city in Gomel Region, in southern Belarus. It serves as the administrative center of Mazyr District. It is situated on the Pripyat River about 210 kilometres (130 miles) east of Pinsk and 100 kilometres (62 miles) northwest of Chernobyl in Ukraine. As of 2025, it has a population of 104,517.

Mazyr is known as a center of oil refining, salt extraction, machine building, and food processing in Belarus. It is home to one of the largest oil refineries in Belarus, pumping out 18 million metric tons per year, and is served by a tram line. The Druzhba pipeline carries crude oil from Russia, splitting in two at Mazyr. One pipeline branch is directed into Poland and the other one to Ukraine.

== History ==
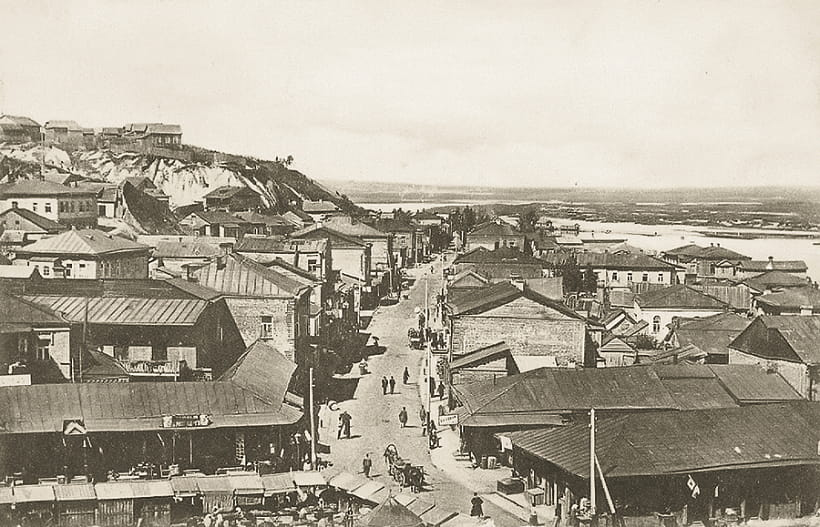
Early-20th-century view of the city

The city was mentioned in 1155.

It was a county seat in the Mińsk Voivodeship of the Polish–Lithuanian Commonwealth until the Partitions of Poland. In the 18th century, Baroque monasteries and churches of Cistercian monks and nuns were established. In c. 1729, a Jesuit school was relocated to Mazyr from Jurewicze. At various times, the 2nd and 3rd Lithuanian Vanguard Regiments were stationed there.

During the Partitions of Poland, the city was annexed by Russia, within which it was administratively part of the Minsk Governorate. The city was subjected to Russification policies. In the 19th century both Cistercian monasteries were closed down. The women's convent was converted into an Orthodox monastery, while the men's monastery was planned to be demolished, but the plan was abandoned as it served as a shelter for Jews after a city fire. Two annual fairs were held in the city in the late 19th century. During the Polish–Soviet War, on March 4, 1920, the town was captured by the Poles, but later on it fell to the Soviets.

During World War II, the German occupiers operated a Nazi prison in the town.

The city has suffered radioactive fallout from the Chernobyl disaster.

After the dissolution of the Soviet Union, Cistercian churches were restored to the Catholics.

== Climate ==
Climate data for Mazyr (1991–2020)
Month	Jan	Feb	Mar	Apr	May	Jun	Jul	Aug	Sep	Oct	Nov	Dec	Year
Record high °C (°F)	11.6 (52.9)	15.5 (59.9)	25.8 (78.4)	29.5 (85.1)	33.2 (91.8)	36.4 (97.5)	36.5 (97.7)	40.3 (104.5)	34.9 (94.8)	27.7 (81.9)	24.1 (75.4)	12.3 (54.1)	40.3 (104.5)
Mean daily maximum °C (°F)	−1.6 (29.1)	−0.1 (31.8)	5.7 (42.3)	14.4 (57.9)	20.5 (68.9)	23.9 (75.0)	25.8 (78.4)	24.9 (76.8)	19.0 (66.2)	11.8 (53.2)	4.3 (39.7)	−0.4 (31.3)	12.3 (54.1)
Daily mean °C (°F)	−3.9 (25.0)	−3.1 (26.4)	1.5 (34.7)	9.0 (48.2)	14.7 (58.5)	18.3 (64.9)	20.1 (68.2)	19.1 (66.4)	13.7 (56.7)	7.6 (45.7)	1.8 (35.2)	−2.5 (27.5)	8.0 (46.4)
Mean daily minimum °C (°F)	−6.0 (21.2)	−5.7 (21.7)	−1.8 (28.8)	4.4 (39.9)	9.7 (49.5)	13.3 (55.9)	15.2 (59.4)	14.2 (57.6)	9.6 (49.3)	4.3 (39.7)	0.0 (32.0)	−4.5 (23.9)	4.4 (39.9)
Record low °C (°F)	−33.9 (−29.0)	−37.0 (−34.6)	−28.7 (−19.7)	−9.7 (14.5)	−3.9 (25.0)	0.4 (32.7)	5.2 (41.4)	1.0 (33.8)	−4.2 (24.4)	−9.7 (14.5)	−22.2 (−8.0)	−34.1 (−29.4)	−18.6 (−1.5)
Average precipitation mm (inches)	41.7 (1.64)	40.6 (1.60)	45.8 (1.80)	40.5 (1.59)	68.6 (2.70)	69.5 (2.74)	100.9 (3.97)	59.1 (2.33)	47.8 (1.88)	55.6 (2.19)	46.9 (1.85)	47.1 (1.85)	664.1 (26.15)
Average precipitation days (≥ 1.0 mm)	10.0	9.8	9.7	7.5	9.9	9.5	10.3	7.6	7.6	8.4	8.9	10.5	109.7
Source 1: NOAA
Source 2: Omiget (August record high)

== Jewish community ==
Jews were first mentioned in chronicles in the second half of the 17th century. It is known that there were three synagogues in the city as of 1856. R. Kugel, a prominent Jewish community figure, had been the chief Rabbi of Mazyr since 1861. He was also the head of the local Jewish literacy school.

During this period Jews were mostly engaged in craftsmanship and trading. Part of Mazyr's industry, the match factory and the wood sawing factory were owned by Jews.

There were eight active synagogues, a yeshiva, Jewish school and Talmud-Torah school in the wake of the 20th century. All of the facilities had been closed down by 1939.

Thousands of Jews were executed by German troops in the local ghetto during World War II. After the mass execution, almost no Jews remained in the city, whereas before the war 30% of the population within the city was Jewish. On August 31, 1941, hundreds of Jews gathered inside a house at Malo-Pushkin street. They poured kerosene on the building walls and set it alight, while the people huddled inside. The mass suicide was an attempt to escape execution by the Germans. The incident is known as the "Belarusian Masada".

After the war some Jews returned to Mazyr. Although they refused to take back the partially-destroyed synagogue building, an official Jewish community was registered in 1946. A few years later, authorities denied the organization's right to exist. The community organization was re-established officially in 1989, when a revival began in the city. A synagogue and a Jewish culture club were opened.

== Sights ==
- Baroque Cathedral in the name of Archangel Michael and former Bernardine monastery
- Baroque Cistercian monks church and monastery
- Baroque Cistercian nuns church and monastery
- The Mazyr Castle, dating back to 16th century
- A monument for Jews at the place of a mass grave
- A monument composed of black polished granite, commemorating the aforementioned "Belarusian Masada"
- A monument placed at the point of mass executions
- The Pkhov river port, the biggest port of Belarus

== Population ==
Year	Total Population	Jewish population	% Jewish	Notes
1897	8076	5631	69.73%	Russian Census of 1897
1927	14300	~6000	42%	Soviet Census of 1927
1939	17500	6307	36.04%	Jewish population just before World War II
1970	48000	4300	8.96%	Soviet Census of 1970. The Jewish population fell due to Holocaust and migration to bigger cities as Minsk, Moscow and Leningrad after World War II
1979	105882	3600	3.40%	Soviet Census of 1979. The Jewish population fell due to the emigration of Soviet Jews to Israel and the United States
1989	128000	3200	2.50%	Soviet Census of 1989. The Jewish population fell due to the emigration of Soviet Jews to Israel and the United States
1999	114000	565	0.50%	The Jewish population fell due to the emigration of Soviet Jews to Israel and United States
2004	111500	<500	0.45%

== Transport ==
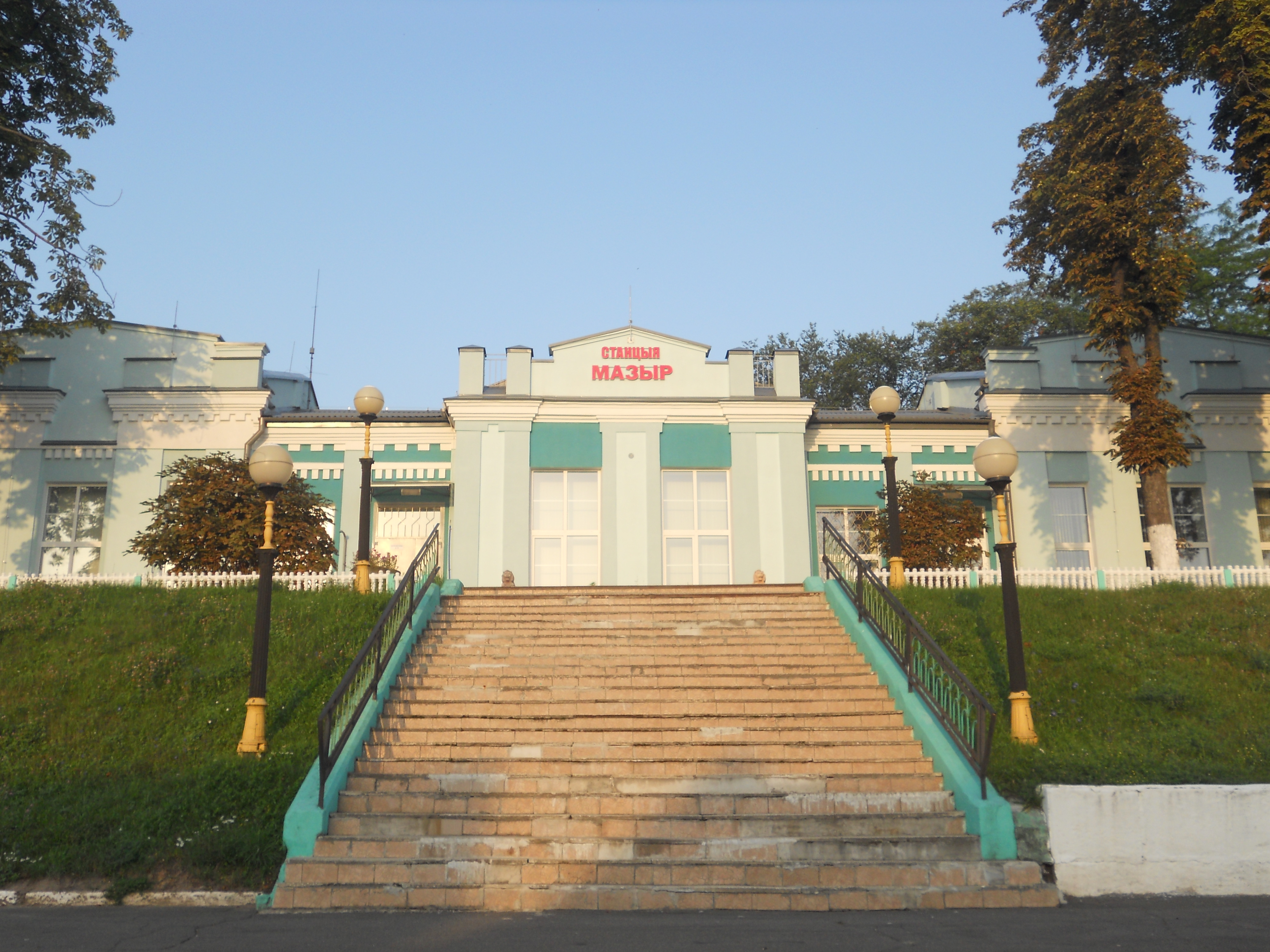
Railway station

Mazyr has a tram service, which commenced operation on 1 August 1988. The line starts at the tram depot and terminates at the oil refinery, with four turning loops located along the route. It is designed to server Mazyr Oil Refinery (MNPZ) and is owned by the refinery. Services on the tram line are coordinated with shifts at the refinery; service throughout the day is every 25-95 minutes while during the peaks it is 3-12 minutes, though those services pass suburban stops without stopping. Most passengers are workers, though it also serves residents living near the line. The total length of the line is 20.3 km, with a full trip time of 40 minutes. The line has a high-speed layout, with radius of minimum 400 meters. There were plans for a second tram line, but this has not come to fruition. The rolling stock is mainly 71-605 and its derivative vehicles. VD Bolshoi Bokov airfield is located 4 miles (6.4 km) south of Mazyr and was used by Russian military aircraft during the 2022 Russian invasion of Ukraine.

== Educational Centers ==
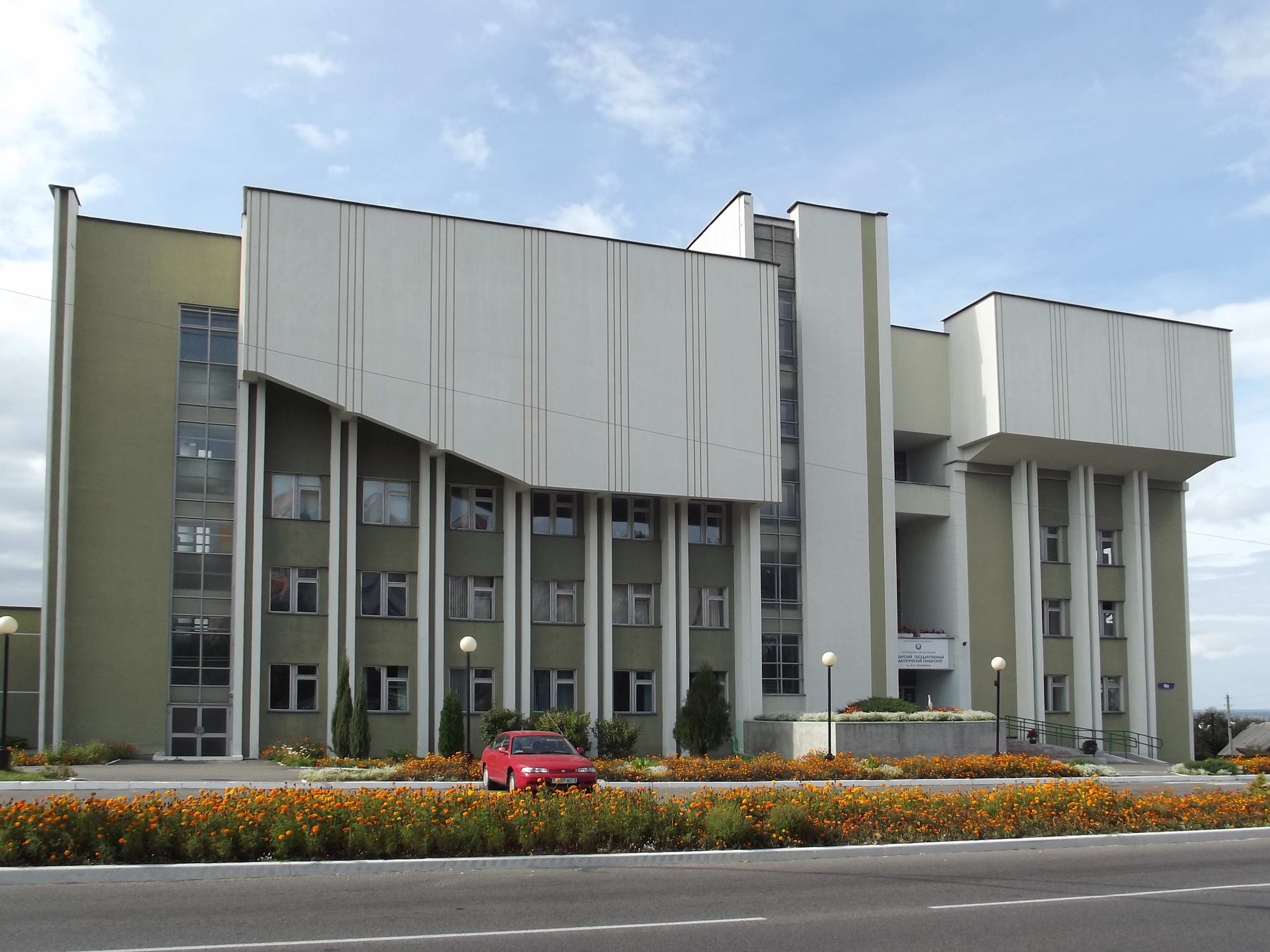
Mozyr State Pedagogical University

- Mozyr State Pedagogical University
- State Politehnikum (Technical College)
- Medical College
- Music College
- Art School
- State Lycee
- Gomel State School of Olympic Reserve

== Twin towns – sister cities ==
Mazyr is twinned with:

- Chojnice, Poland
- Severodvinsk, Russia

== Notable residents ==
- Siarhiej Dubaviec (b.1959) – Belarusian journalist and writer
- Roman Gofman (b.1976) - Director of the Mossad
- George de Mohrenschildt⁣ – geologist and friend of Lee Harvey Oswald
- Isaac Don Levine was born there
- Zbigniew Morsztyn⁣ – Polish nobleman of Leliwa coat of arms, poet of the Baroque era, soldier, member of the Polish Brethren, Miecznik of Mazyr. Cousin and co-worker of Jan Andrzej Morsztyn.
- Ksenia Sitnik⁣ – singer and winner of the Junior Eurovision Song Contest 2005
- Dzyanis Laptsew⁣ – footballer
- Hesya Helfman⁣ – member of Narodnaya Volya, who was implicated in the assassination of Tsar Alexander II
