= Mayachny =

Mayachny Маячный
- Selo
- Location within Bashkortostan Location within Russia
- Coordinates: 52°41′N 55°41′E
- Country: Russia
- Region: Bashkortostan
- District: Kumertau

Area
  - Total: 2.7 km^{2} (1.0 sq mi)

Population (2010)
  - Total: 3,075
  - Density: 1,100/km^{2} (2,900/sq mi)
- Time zone: UTC+5:00

Mayachny (Russian: Маячный) is a rural locality (a selo) in Kumertau, Bashkortostan, Russia. The population was 3,075 as of 2010. There are 35 streets.

== Geography ==
Mayachny is located 15 km southwest of Kumertau. Shabagish is the nearest rural locality.
