= Vladislav Grib =

Russian lawyer (born 1972)

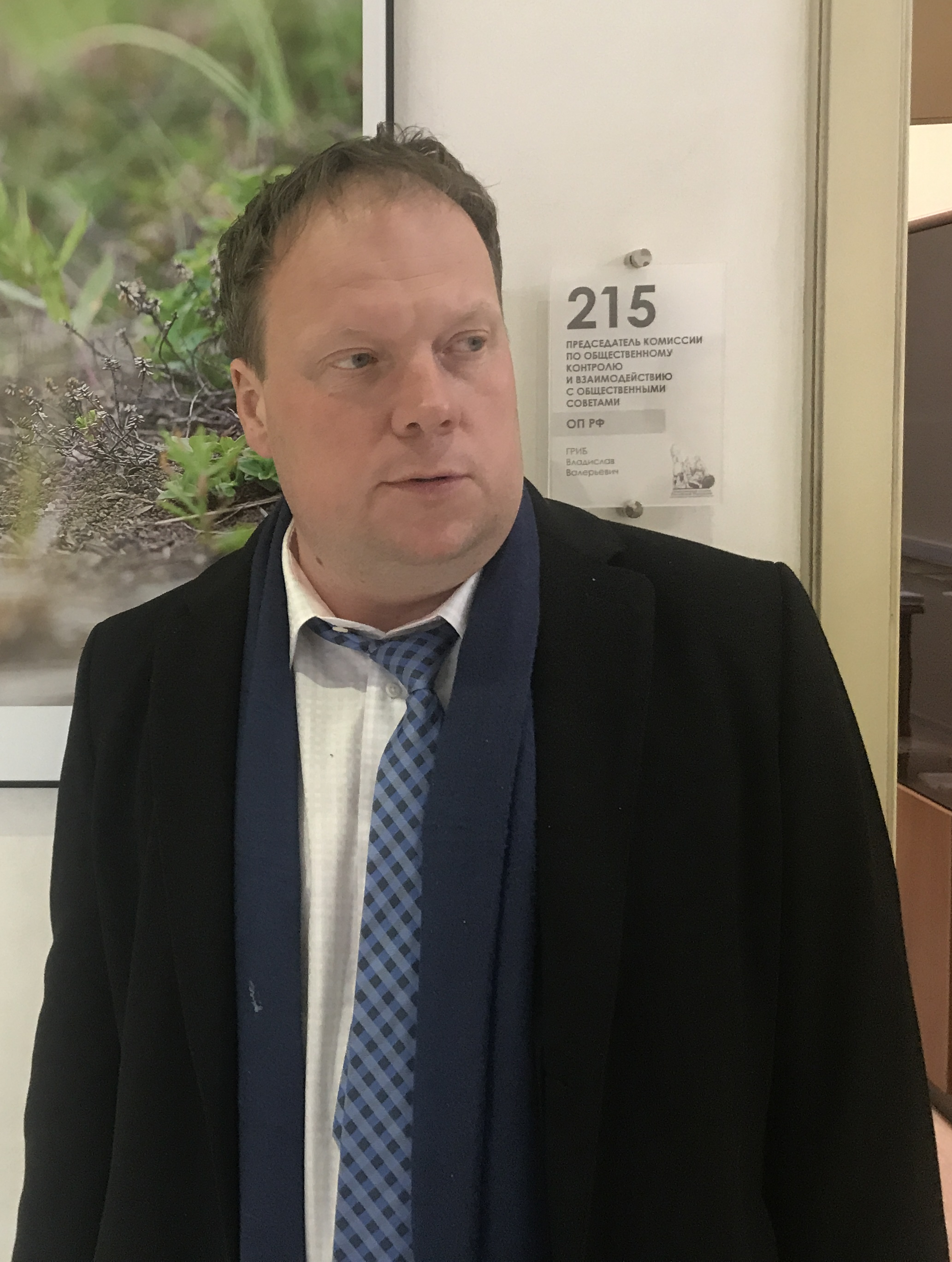
Vladislav Grib, member of the Civic Chamber of the Russian Federation

Vladislav Grib (Russian: Владислав Валерьевич Гриб; 16 May 1972) is a Russian lawyer and politician. His appointment in June 2016 as a personal representative to the OSCE’s Chairperson-in-Office “on combating racism, xenophobia and discrimination” has been heavily criticized since he has been accused of rubberstamping the Crimean referendum which took place in Crimea before its annexation by the Russian Federation.

== Awards ==
2007 – A.F. Koni Medal, Ministry of Justice of the Russian Federation

2002 – Medal "For Diligence" II Class, Ministry of Justice of the Russian Federation

2003 – Medal "In Commemoration of the 200th Anniversary of the Ministry of Justice of the Russian Federation"

2004 – Medal "For Assistance to the Ministry of Internal Affairs of Russia"

2003 – Badge of Honor "Honored Worker in the Sphere of Youth Policy"

2013 – Medal "For Assistance to the Drug Control Authorities," Federal Drug Control Service of Russia

2013 – Order of Friendship (by Decree of the President of the Russian Federation)

2014 – Certificate of Honor of the President of the Russian Federation

2007 – Certificate of Honor of the State Duma of the Federal Assembly of the Russian Federation

2003 – Certificate of Honor of the Ministry of Education of the Russian Federation

2007 – Certificate of Honor of the Prosecutor General’s Office of the Russian Federation

2007 – Certificate of Honor of the Ministry of Internal Affairs of the Russian Federation

2003 – Honorary Badge "Honored Worker in the Youth Sphere," Ministry of Education of the Russian Federation

2003 – Certificate of Honor of the Chairman of the Supreme Arbitration Court of the Russian Federation

2004 – Certificate of Honor of the Ministry of Internal Affairs of the Russian Federation

2007 – Certificate of Honor of the Federal Penitentiary Service of the Ministry of Justice of the Russian Federation

2007 – Certificate of Honor of the President of the Chechen Republic

2007 – Certificate of Honor of the Commander-in-Chief of the Russian Ground Forces

2013 – Certificate of Honor of the Prosecutor General’s Office of the Russian Federation

2013 – Certificate of Honor of the Federal Chamber of Lawyers of the Russian Federation
