= Mozyr State Pedagogical University =

Higher educational institution in Mozyr, Gomel Region, Belarus

- Мазырскі дзяржаўны педагагічны ўніверсітэт
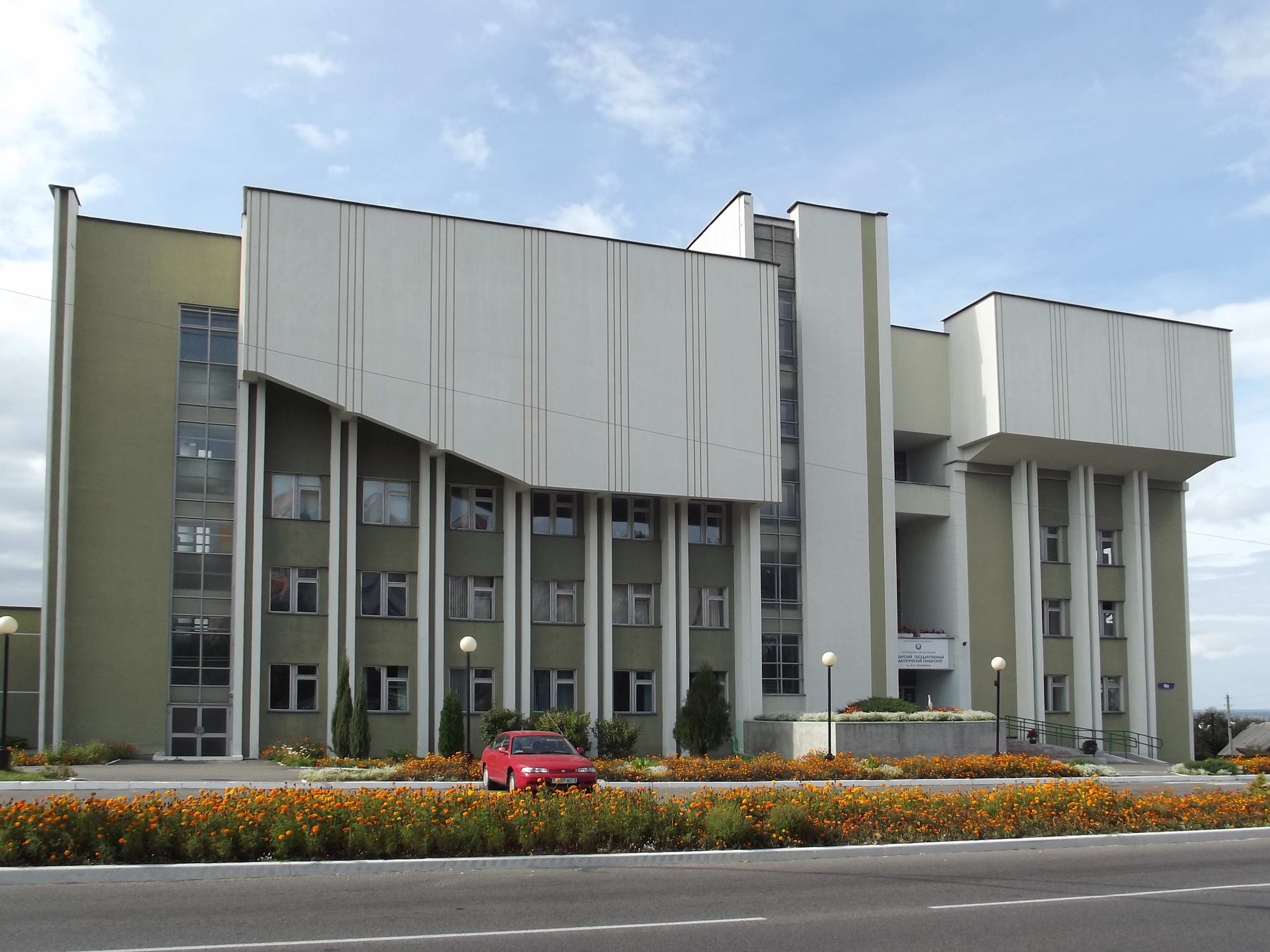
- Former names: Mozyr Teachers' Institute
- Type: public
- Established: 1944
- Students: 3993 (2016)
- Location: 28 Studencheskaya str, Mazyr, Belarus; 52°26′43″N 30°59′32″E
- Campus: Urban
- Website: www.mspu.by

Mozyr State Pedagogical University (Belarusian: Мазырскі дзяржаўны педагагічны ўніверсітэт імя І. П. Шамякіна, romanized: Mazyrski dziaržaŭny piedahahičny ŭniviersitet imia I. P. Šamiakina) is a higher educational institution based in Mozyr, Gomel Region, Belarus.

== History ==
Founded in 1944 as the Mozyr Teachers' Institute. The training of teachers was conducted in three departments: language and literature, physics and mathematics, natural history and geography. The structure of the institute consisted of 7 departments, which employed 27 teachers. In 1946, the first graduation took place: 86 teachers of history, language and literature, 32 - physics and mathematics, 36 - natural history and chemistry.

In 1952 the university was reorganized as the Mozyr Pedagogical Institute by Resolution of the Council of Ministers № 999 signed on July 22, 1952. In 1964 the institute was named after Nadezhda Krupskaya. In 2002, the institute was transformed into the Mozyr State Pedagogical University, which was named in 2006 after the People's Writer of Belarus Ivan Shamiakin in according with by a presidential decree.
