= Russian School of Private Law =

- Российская школа частного права
- Type: Public
- Established: 1994
- Rector: Lidia Iu. Micheeva
- Location: Moscow, Yekaterinburg
- Website: privlaw.ru, www.privlaw-ural.ru

Russian School of Private Law (Institute) (Russian: Российская школа частного права, РШЧП) is a graduate school of law of the Research Centre of Private Law under the President of Russia, which is a public research institution located in Moscow, Russia. Being one of the leading Russian academic and research law schools, it offers a postgraduate program (Master of Private Law, formerly also Master of Laws) with specialization in Russian and comparative private law for applicants holding specialist or bachelor's degree in Russian law. The school has a branch in Yekaterinburg (Ural branch). Since July 23, 2015 the school is directed by Andrey V. Egorov (Deputy Rector).

== Foundation ==
The school and the Research Centre of Private Law were founded in 1994 by a special decree of the President of the Russian Federation. According to the Decree Moscow campus of the school, and its Ural branch were established "for the training of specialists with higher education in legislative and teaching knowledge of private law".

== Educational process ==
Admission to the Russian School of Private Law is highly competitive due to the strict requirement of extensive knowledge of private law and limited number of places. In 2015 the school announced a call for 30 state-funded places in Moscow and 19 in Yekaterinburg, and 20 self-funded places. A candidate must submit a 15–20-page essay on the civil law topic, present it before the Admission Committee and satisfy the relevant questions posed by the members of the Committee.

From 1994 the school graduated 20 classes. As for now, there were 516 graduates from the campus in Moscow and 400 from the Ural branch.

The Moscow campus has 4 Departments:

- Department of Intellectual Rights (directed by Elena A. Pavlova)
- Department of Property law (directed by Nikolai A. Syrodoev)
- Department of Private International Law (directed by Alexei N. Zhiltsov)
- Department of General Problems of Civil Law (directed by Andrei V. Egorov)

The Ural branch has 2 Departments:

- Department of Civil Law
- Department of Comparative Law and International Law

== Legislative activity and expertise ==
The school was established within the premises of the Research Council of Private Law and the Presidential Council for the Codification and Modernization of Civil Legislation. The school plays a role in the development of civil legislation in Russia and together with both Councils is involved in national civil law-related activities, including:

- Drafting of the Concept Paper on the Development of Russian Civil Legislation; and the new Russian Civil Code;
- Civil law expertise of Federal and Regional Legislation;

== Directorship ==
- 1995 – 1996 - Stanislav A. Khokhlov
- 1996 – 1997 - Yuri H. Kalmykov
- 1997 – 1999 - Alexander L. Makovskiy
- 1999 – 2010 - Pavel V. Krasheninnikov
- 2010 – 2012 - Artyom G. Karapetov
- 2012 – 2015 - Alexander L. Makovskiy (Deputy Rector)
- Since 2015 - Andrey V. Egorov (Deputy Rector)

== Academic staff ==
The school's academic staff includes experts and members of both the Research Council of Private Law and the Presidential Council for the Codification and Modernization of Civil Legislation, arbitrators of the International Commercial Arbitration Court at the Russian Chamber of Commerce, as well as visiting professors from other law schools. The academic staff includes Russian lawyers and academics, such as Veniamin F. Yakovlev, Alexander L. Makovskiy, Eugeny A. Sukhanov, Pavel V. Krasheninnikov, Dmitry V. Dozhdev, Anton V. Asoskov. Among 40 members of permanent academic staff there are 12 Doctors and 21 Candidates of Legal Sciences.

== Graduates ==
More than 100 graduates of the school pursued their academic career and received the Candidate of Legal Sciences degree (an equivalent to Ph.D. in law degree). Many graduates of the school work in the judiciary.
