= Housing Code of Russia =

Parliament of Russia
- Citation: 188-ФЗ
- Territorial extent: Russia
- Enacted by: Parliament of Russia
- Signed by: President of Russia
- Signed: 29 December 2004
- Commenced: 1 March 2005
- Status: In force

The Housing Code of Russia is the prime source of Law of the Russian Federation concerning Housing matters. The previous Housing code of the Russian Federation was signed into law on 29 December 2004. It was subsequently amended on 22 December 2020.

== Structure ==
The Code consists of 10 sections, 19 chapters and 202 articles in its amended version.

=== Section I. General Provisions ===
Chapter 1: Basic provisions. Housing legislation
Chapter 2: Objects of housing laws. Housing stock
Chapter 3 Transfer of premises to non-residential premises and the non-residential premises to premises

Chapter 4: Conversion of and alterations to dwelling

=== Section II. Property Right and Other Corporeal Rights to Premises. ===
Chapter 5: The rights and obligations of the owner of housing and other living room in its own citizens
Chapter 6: Common property owners in an apartment house. General meeting of owners

=== Section III. Accommodations provided under contracts of social hiring ===
Chapter 7: Reasons and procedure of the premises under the social contract of employment Chapter 8: Social rent premises

=== Section IV. Specialized housing ===
Chapter 9 Dwellings specialized housing

Chapter 10: Provision of specialized premises and their use

=== Section V. Housing and housing co-operatives ===
Chapter 11: Organization and operation of housing and housing co-operatives
Chapter 12: The legal status of members of housing cooperatives

=== Section VI. Homeowners ===
Chapter 13: Establishment and operation of homeowners
Chapter 14: The legal status of members of the homeowners association

=== Section VIII. Management of apartment buildings ===
The choice of a method for controlling a block of flats. General requirements for the management activities of an apartment house. Council block of flats. Contract management of the apartment house management of an apartment house, located in the state or municipal property Direct management of an apartment house owners of the premises in such a house Creating local government conditions for the management of apartment buildings

== See also ==
- Code for Sustainable Homes
