= Irina Pankina =

Russian politician

Irina Pankina MP
- Ирина Панькина
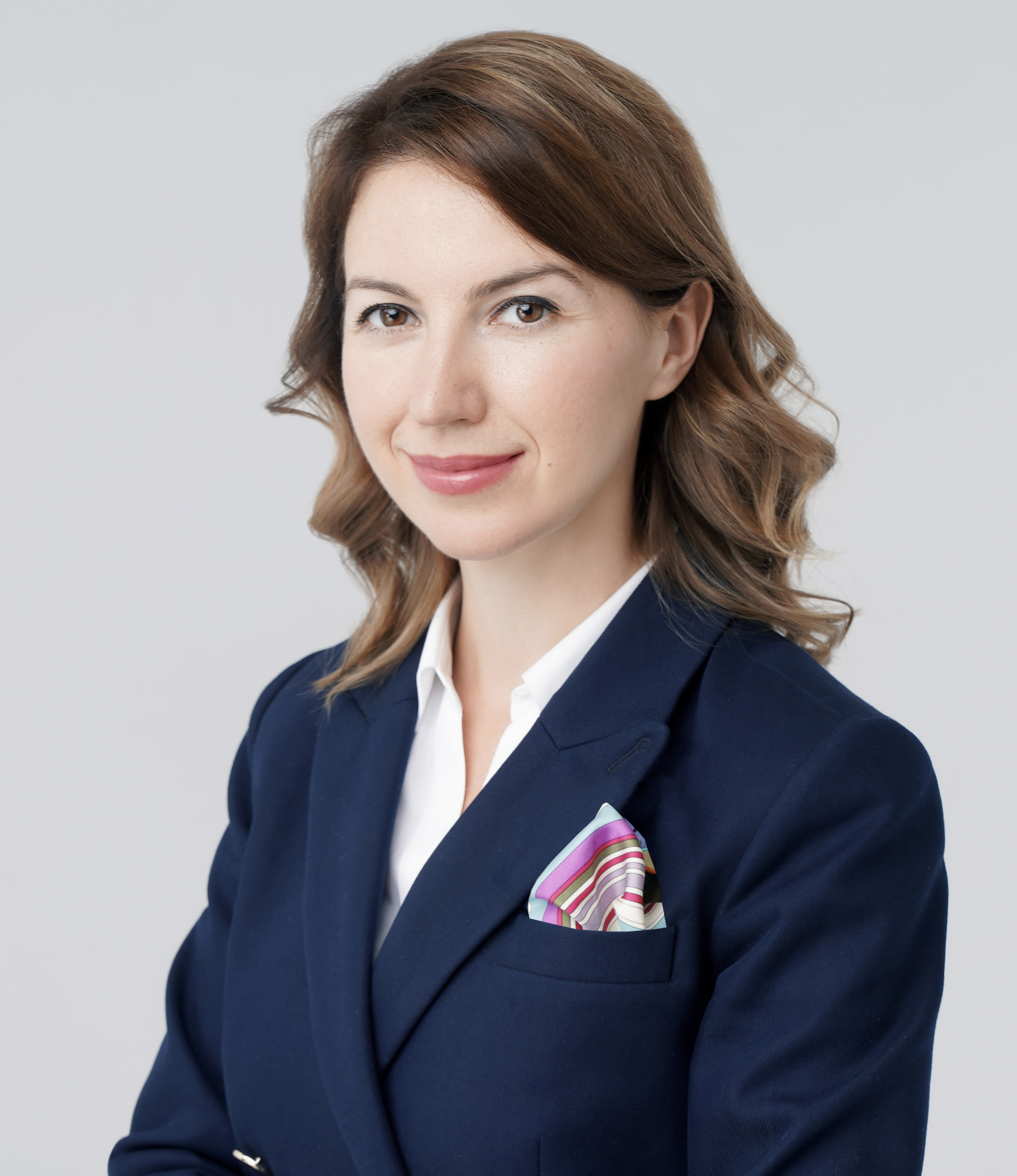

Member of the State Duma (Party List Seat)
- Incumbent
- Assumed office 12 October 2021

Personal details
- Born: 8 March 1986 (age 40) Mayachny, Kumertau, Bashkir ASSR, RSFSR, USSR
- Party: United Russia
- Education: Bashkir State University

Irina Alexandrovna Pankina (Russian: Ирина Александровна Панькина; born March 8, 1986, Mayachny, Kumertau) is a Russian politician and a deputy of the 8th State Duma.

== Biography ==
In 2007 Irina graduated from Bashkir State University. She has a PhD in law.

In 2007 she started working as a legal adviser at the Sberbank branch in Ufa. From 2009 to 2010, she was the leading specialist at the Plenipotentiary Representation of the Republic of Bashkortostan of the President of the Russian Federation. In 2011 she started working in the apparatus of the State Duma. Since September 2021 she has served as deputy of the 8th State Duma.

From October 2021 Irina Pankina is the first deputy chairman of the State Duma Committee on State Construction and Legislation.

She is a member of the Association of Lawyers of Russia. From 2021 she is a chairman of the department in Bashkortostan.

== Sanctions ==
She was sanctioned by the UK government in 2022 in relation to the Russo-Ukrainian War.

She is one of the members of the State Duma the United States Treasury sanctioned on 24 March 2022 in response to the 2022 Russian invasion of Ukraine.
