= List of 1st class Active State Councillors of the Russian Federation (2005–2009) =

1st class Active State Councillor of the Russian Federation (Russian: действительный государственный советник Российской Федерации 1 класса) is the highest federal state civilian service rank of Russia. The following list is a list of all persons who was promoted to this rank during the period 2005–2009:

- Oleg Utkin
- Oleg Markov
- Dmitry Peskov
- Sergey Sobyanin
- Oleg Govorun
- Sergey Dubik
- Kamil Iskhakov
- Aleksandr Konovalov
- Mikhail Krotov
- Modest Kolerov
- Lyubov Kudelina
- Anatoly Gordeyev
- Nikolay Stolyarov
- Sergey Fateyev
- Mikhail Klishin
- Ivan Malyushin
- Igor Rudenya
- Alexander Nesterov
- Valery Nazarov
- Sergey Novikov
- Vladimir Strlzhalkovsky
- Vladimir Shamakhov
- Tatyana Valovaya
- Vsevolod Vukolov
- Sergey Kalashnikov
- Mikhail Lychagin
- Nikolay Moiseyev
- Olga Pushkareva
- Andrey Ryakhovsky
- Marina Senkovskaya
- Grigory Rapota
- Nadezhda Gerasimova
- Ruslan Tsalikov
- Lyubov Glebova
- Ruslan Tatarinov
- Anton Vaino
- Aleksandr Zharov
- Yuriy Chikhanchin
- Evgeny Shkolov
- Vladimir Fridlyanov
- Nikolay Makarov
- Oleg Safonov
- Nikolay Tsvetkov
- Vladimir Osipov
- Vladimir Milovidov
- Anton Siluanov
- Sergey Naryshkin
- Aleksey Sigutkin
- Sergey Vinokurov
- Sergey Komissarov
- Sergey Osipov
- Leonid Reiman
- Pyotr Skorospelov
- Sergey Sobolev
- Vladimir Ustinov
- Andrey Tsybulin
- Konstantin Chuychenko
- Yaroslav Shabanov
- Khazbi Bogov
- Anatoly Perminov
- Mikhail Dmitriev
- Nikolay Vinnichenko
- Larisa Mishustina
- Kirill Androsov
- Nelli Nagoyvzina
- Vladimir Ostrovenko
- Vladislav Putilin
- Alexander Smirnov
- Yuri Ushakov
- Vitaly Shipov
- Tatyana Nesterenko
- Igor Artemyev
- Sergey Maev
- Vyacheslav Beresnev
- Tatyana Kuznetsova
- Nikolay Mikheev
- Svetlana Trubacheva
- Vadim Fadeev
- Ilya Lomakin-Rumyantsev
- Viktor Ishayev
- Aleksey Glagolev
- Vladimir Chernov
- Sergey Mazurenko
- Yury Petrov
- Andrey Dementiev
- Sergey Kruglik
- Maksim Travnikov
- Mikhail Mokretsov
- Yuriy Voronin
- Maxim Topilin
- Mikhail Mikhaylovsky
- Sergey Pchelintsev
- Tatyana Kulkina
- Anastasiya Rakova
- Anatoly Yanovsky
- Yuriy Sharandin

== See also ==
- State civilian and municipal service ranks in Russian Federation
