= List of 1st class Active State Councillors of the Russian Federation (1995–1999) =

1st class Active State Councillor of the Russian Federation (Russian: действительный государственный советник Российской Федерации 1 класса) is the highest federal state civilian service rank of Russia. The following list is a list of all persons who was promoted to this rank during the period 1995–1999:

- Nikolai Yegorov
- Viktor Ilyushin
- Yuri Baturin
- Anatoly Korabelshchikov
- Mikhail Krasnov
- Alexander Livshits
- Dmitry Ryurikov
- Georgy Satarov
- Lev Sukhanov
- Boris Kuzyk
- Valery Semenchenko
- Vladimir Shevchenko
- Sergey Medvedev
- Sergey Krasavchenko
- Vladimir Antipov
- Valeryan Viktorov
- Ruslan Orekhov
- Anatoly Semyonov
- Igor Agarkov
- Andrey Busygin
- Andrey Voykov
- Vadim Pechenev
- Vyacheslav Romanov
- Igor Rybakov
- Larisa Brychyova
- Anatoly Ivanov
- Vyacheslav Ivanov
- Sergey Kudravets
- Andrey Loginov
- Alexander Maslov
- Mikhail Mironov
- Alexander Olefirenko
- Sergey Samoylov
- Yury Solodukhin
- Anatoly Volkov
- Vasily Frolov
- Viktor Petrushkin
- Valery Platonov
- Igor Sorokin
- Yury Shcherbakov
- Vladimir Zolotarev
- Valery Manilov
- Vladimir Rubanov
- Alexander Troshin
- Pavel Borodin
- Vladimir Kozelko
- Alexander Nikitin
- Vladimir Balduev
- Alexander Lyulkin
- Sergey Mironov
- Viktor Savchenko
- Oleg Stepanov
- Svetlana Filonenko
- Alexander Kotenkov
- Mikhail Mityukov
- Anatoly Sliva
- Maksim Boyko
- Alexander Kazakov
- Alexei Kudrin
- Evgeny Savostyanov
- Anatoly Chubais
- Yury Yarov
- Sergey Shakhray
- Sergey Ignatyev
- Sergey Yastrzhembsky
- Vyacheslav Vasyagin
- Sergey Volzhin
- Alexey Gromov
- Sergey Matsko
- Nina Sivova
- Anton Fedorov
- Valery Chernov
- Yury Shustitsky
- Anatoly Zelinsky
- Valentin Yumashev
- Vladimir Putin
- Anatoly Golovatyy
- Eduard Esterlein
- Viktor Nagaytsev
- Nikolay Troshkin
- Pavel Averin
- Viktor Elchev
- Nikolay Lyakh
- Boris Berezovsky
- Yury Deryabin
- Nikolay Mikhaylov
- Vyacheslav Pakharev
- Vladimir Panfilov
- Vladimir Nikitov
- Roman Romanov
- Mikhail Korobeynikov
- Yury Kurbatov
- Alexey Ogarev
- Boris Agapov
- Sergey Vasilyev
- Boris Pashkov
- Evgeny Arefyev
- Aleksandr Kozlov
- Valery Kurenkov
- Valery Orlov
- Alexey Prokopyev
- Andrey Sebentsov
- Gennady Petelin
- Andrey Kokoshin
- Mikhail Komissar
- Anton Danilov-Danilyan
- Mikhail Margelov
- Boris Mints
- Sergei Prikhodko
- Evgeny Ivanushkin
- Viktoriya Mitina
- Alexander Ageenkov
- Dzhakhan Pollyeva
- Sergey Zenkin
- Oleg Velyashev
- Igor Gorshkov
- Viktor Klimov
- Igor Semyonov
- Denis Molchanov
- Igor Shabdurasulov
- Vyacheslav Mikhaylov
- Sergey Shapovalov
- Andrey Yanik
- Pyotr Deynekin
- Ivan Rybkin
- Oleg Sysuev
- Aleksandr Voloshin
- Dmitry Yakushkin
- Albert Ageev
- Mstislav Afanasyev
- Robert Markaryan
- Aleksandr Torshin
- Armen Medvedev
- Ivan Materov
- Arkady Samokhvalov
- Andrey Svinarenko
- Alexey Gordeyev
- Vladimir Shcherbak
- Ivan Gorbachev
- Igor Mitrofanov
- Gennady Kozlov
- Gennady Tereshchenko
- Mikhail Kasyanov
- Alexander Braverman
- Yury Medvedev
- Alexander Lugovets
- Anatoly Nasonov
- Yuri Vorobyov
- Nikolay Mikheev
- Boris Yatskevich
- Igor Chekmezov
- Robert Tsivilev
- Ivan Leshkevich
- Gennady Onishchenko
- Vladimir Makarov
- Evgeny Lisov
- Andrey Shtorkh
- Yury Vishnevsky
- Oleg Vyugin
- Sergey Karmanov
- Vyacheslav Khizhnyakov
- Alexander Suvorov
- Vladimir Kalamanov
- Vitaly Dolgov
- Valery Pogrebnoy
- Sergey Semakov
- Nikolay Khavansky
- Alexander Bedritsky
- Valentina Tereshkova
- Vladimir Kozlov
- Vladimir Kozhin
- Viktor Denikin
- Galina Kupriyanova
- Valery Shubin

== See also ==
- State civilian and municipal service ranks in Russian Federation
