= Diplomatic rank =

System of professional and social rank

Diplomatic rank is a system of professional and social rank used in the world of diplomacy and international relations. A diplomat's rank determines many ceremonial details, such as the order of precedence at official processions, table seatings at state dinners, the person to whom diplomatic credentials should be presented, and the title by which the diplomat should be addressed.

== International diplomacy ==
=== Ranks ===
The current system of diplomatic ranks was established by the Vienna Convention on Diplomatic Relations (1961). There are three top ranks, two of which remain in use:

- Ambassador. An ambassador is a head of mission who is accredited to the receiving country's head of state. They head a diplomatic mission known as an embassy, headquartered in a chancery usually in the receiving state's capital.
  - A papal nuncio is considered to have ambassadorial rank, and presides over a nunciature.
  - Commonwealth countries send a high commissioner who presides over a high commission and has the same diplomatic rank as an ambassador.
- Minister. A minister was a head of mission who was accredited to the receiving country's head of state. A minister headed a legation rather than an embassy. After World War II, the embassy became the standard form of diplomatic mission, and the rank of minister is now obsolete. Many countries use the title minister-counsellor to refer to the deputy head of a mission, but this is a different title.
  - An envoy or an internuncio is also considered to have the rank of minister.
- Chargé d'affaires:
  - A chargé d'affaires en pied is a permanent head of mission who is accredited by their country's foreign minister to the receiving nation's foreign minister, in cases where the two governments have not reached an agreement to exchange ambassadors.
  - A chargé d'affaires ad interim is a diplomat who temporarily heads a diplomatic mission in the absence of an ambassador.

The body of diplomats accredited to a country form the diplomatic corps. Ambassadors have precedence over chargés, and precedence within each rank is determined by the date on which diplomatic credentials were presented. The longest-serving ambassador is the dean of the diplomatic corps, who speaks for the entire diplomatic corps on matters of diplomatic privilege and protocol. However, in many Catholic countries, the papal nuncio is always considered the dean of the diplomatic corps.

=== Historical ranks, 1815–1961 ===
The ranks established by the Vienna Convention (1961) modify a more elaborate system of ranks that was established by the Congress of Vienna (1815):

- Ambassadors, legates and nuncios were personal representatives of their sovereign.
- Envoys and ministers represented their government and were accredited to the receiving sovereign.
- Ministers resident formed an intermediate class between ministers and chargés. This rank was created by the Congress of Aix-la-Chapelle (1818)
- Chargés d'affaires were accredited by their foreign minister to the receiving foreign minister.

The rank of envoy was short for "envoy extraordinary and minister plenipotentiary", and was more commonly known as "minister". For example, the "envoy extraordinary and minister plenipotentiary of the United States to the French Empire" was known as the "United States Minister to France" and addressed as "Monsieur le Ministre".

An ambassador was regarded as the personal representative of his sovereign as well as his government. Only major monarchies would exchange ambassadors with each other, while smaller monarchies and republics only sent ministers. Because of diplomatic reciprocity, Great Powers would only send a minister to a smaller monarchy or a republic. For example, in the waning years of the Second French Empire, the United Kingdom sent an ambassador to Paris, while Sweden-Norway and the United States sent ministers.

The rule that only monarchies could send ambassadors was more honored in the breach than the observance. This had been true even before the Congress of Vienna, as England continued to appoint ambassadors even while it was a republic from 1649-1660. Countries that overthrew their monarchs proved to be unwilling to accept the lower rank accorded to a republic. After the Franco-Prussian War, the French Third Republic continued to send and receive ambassadors. The rule became increasingly untenable as the United States grew into a Great Power. The United States followed the French precedent in 1893, and began to exchange ambassadors with other Great Powers.

Historically, the order of precedence had been a matter of great dispute. European powers agreed that the papal nuncio and imperial ambassador would have precedence, but could not agree on the relative precedence of the kingdoms and smaller countries. In 1768, the French and Russian ambassadors to Great Britain even fought a duel over who had the right to sit next to the imperial ambassador at a court ball. After several diplomatic incidents between their ambassadors, France and Spain agreed in 1761 to let the date of arrival determine their precedence. In 1760, Portugal attempted to apply seniority to all ambassadors, but the rule was rejected by the other European courts.

The Congress of Vienna finally put an end to these disputes over precedence. After an initial attempt to divide countries into three ranks faltered on the question of which country should be in each rank, the Congress instead decided to divide diplomats into three ranks. A fourth rank was added by the Congress of Aix-la-Chapelle (1818). Each diplomatic rank had precedence over the lower ranks, and precedence within each rank was determined by the date that their credentials were presented. The papal nuncio could be given a different precedence than the other ambassadors. The Holy Roman Empire had ceased to exist in 1806, so the Austrian ambassador would accumulate seniority along with the other ambassadors.

=== Bilateral diplomacy ===
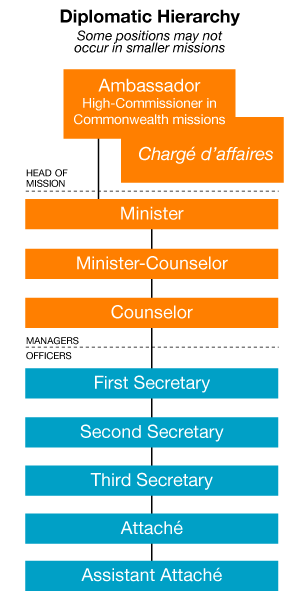
The distinction between managers and officers is not necessarily as apparent. Senior officers (such as first and second secretaries) often manage junior diplomats and locally hired staff.

In modern diplomatic practice, there are a number of diplomatic ranks below "Ambassador." Since most missions are now headed by an ambassador, these ranks now rarely indicate a mission's (or its host nation's) relative importance, but rather reflect the diplomat's individual seniority within their own nation's diplomatic career path and in the diplomatic corps in the host nation:

- Ambassador (High Commissioner in Commonwealth missions to other Commonwealth countries); ambassador at large
- Minister
- Minister-Counsellor
- Counsellor
- First Secretary
- Second Secretary
- Third Secretary
- Attaché
- Assistant Attaché

The term attaché is used for any diplomatic agent who does not fit in the standard diplomatic ranks, often because they are not (or were not traditionally) members of the sending country's diplomatic service or foreign ministry, and were therefore only "attached" to the diplomatic mission. The most frequent use is for military attachés, but the diplomatic title may be used for any specific individual or position as required, generally related to a specific or technical field. Since administrative and technical staff benefit from only limited diplomatic immunity, some countries may routinely appoint support staff as attachés. Attaché does not, therefore, denote any rank or position (except in Soviet and post-Soviet diplomatic services, where attaché is the lowest diplomatic rank of a career diplomat). Note that many traditional functionary roles, such as press attaché or cultural attaché, are not formal titles in diplomatic practice, although they may be used as a matter of custom.

=== Multilateral diplomacy ===
Furthermore, outside this traditional pattern of bilateral diplomacy, as a rule on a permanent residency basis (though sometimes doubling elsewhere), certain ranks and positions were created specifically for multilateral diplomacy:

- An ambassador-at-large is equivalent to an ambassador and assigned specific tasks or region in which they are assigned various assignments aimed at multi track diplomacy.
- A permanent representative is the equivalent of an ambassador, normally of that rank, but accredited to an international body (mainly by member—and possibly observer—states), not to a head of state.
- A resident representative (or sometimes simply representative) is also a member of the diplomatic corps, but is below the rank of ambassador. A representative is accredited by an international organization (generally a United Nations agency, or a Bretton Woods institution) to a country's government. The resident representative typically heads the country office of that international organization within that country.
- A special ambassador or honorary ambassador is a government's specialist diplomat in a particular field, not posted in residence, but often traveling around the globe.
- The U.S. trade representative (USTR) is an ambassador of Cabinet rank, in charge of U.S. delegations in multilateral trade negotiations (since 1962). The USTR's special agricultural negotiator also typically holds an ambassadorial appointment.

==== Special envoy ====
Special envoys have been created ad hoc by individual countries, treaties and international organizations including the United Nations. A few examples are provided below:

Australia
The Australian Department of Foreign Affairs and Trade maintains a variety of special interest ambassador and envoy positions including the ambassador for counter-terrorism and the ambassador for the environment.
Belgium
In 2005, former cabinet member Pierre Chevalier served as Special Envoy of the Organization for Security and Co-operation in Europe presidency to mediate in the Gazprom natural gas-pipeline crisis involving Russia, Ukraine, and the European Union. In addition, Princess Astrid of Belgium has served as Special Envoy of the Anti-Personnel Mine Ban Convention or Ottawa Treaty, to promote the formal prohibition of landmines and the rights of the survivors of said weapons.
Bosnia and Herzegovina
A sui generis case is the High Representative for Bosnia and Herzegovina
European Union
appointed various special representatives (some regional, some thematic); e.g., in 2005—as a response to events in Kyrgyzstan and Uzbekistan—the Council of the EU appointed Jan Kubis as its Special Representative for Central Asia.
India
During the 2006 democracy movement in Nepal, India sent on April 18 Karan Singh, who is related to royalty in both predominantly Hindu countries, as Special Envoy to neighbouring Nepal, where increasingly violent opposition started its successful challenge of the king's autocratic rule. Another instance was during the 2009 Copenhagen climate change summit, India appointed senior diplomat Shyam Saran as a special envoy to coordinate the negotiating position of the BASIC countries.
Niue
The Niue Government appoints special envoys to expand Niue's presence internationally. Envoys include

- Special Envoy to Niue for COP26 2021 United Nations Climate Change Conference
- Special Envoy to Niue for the 2022 Japan State Funeral for the former Japan Prime Minister Shinzo Abe

Pakistan
Prime Minister Nawaz Sharif appointed ambassador Javed Malik as Pakistan's special envoy for trade and investment based in the GCC Gulf region with a diplomatic rank of an ambassador
United Kingdom
Appointed special envoys from time to time.
United States
appointed numerous special envoys including a special envoy for Northern Ireland with the diplomatic rank of ambassador to help with the Northern Ireland peace process. Special envoys have also been appointed for Afghanistan, Yemen, Sudan, Syria, Middle East peace, Eurasian energy, climate change, and human rights in North Korea. Other posts include special representative, special advisor, and special coordinator.
UN Secretary-General
The Secretary-General of the United Nations personally mandates special envoys for a particular field, including:

- United Nations Special Envoy for HIV/AIDS in Africa
- United Nations Special Envoy on Climate Change
- United Nations Special Envoy for Kosovo
- United Nations Special Envoy for Darfur
- United Nations Special Envoy for Refugees

UNESCO
The director-general of UNESCO appoints special envoys who can use their talents and renown to further the organization's ideals and action. Envoys include:

- Special Envoy for Basic and Higher Education Sheikha Mozah bint Nasser al-Missned of Qatar
- Special Envoy for Water Prince Talal bin Abdulaziz al Saud
- Special Envoy on Literacy for Development Princess Laurentien of the Netherlands

== Usage worldwide ==
Most countries worldwide have some form of internal rank, roughly parallel to the diplomatic ranks, which are used in their foreign service or civil service in general. The correspondence is not exact, however, for various reasons, including the fact that according to diplomatic usage, all ambassadors are of equal rank, but ambassadors of more senior rank are typically sent to more important postings. Some countries may make specific links or comparisons to military ranks.

=== Australia ===
Officers from the Department of Foreign Affairs and Trade (DFAT) are graded into four broad bands (BB1 to BB4), with the Senior Executive Service (SES Band 1 to SES Band 3) following above.

Ambassadors, High Commissioners and Consuls-General usually come from the Senior Executive Service, although in smaller posts the head of mission may be a BB4 officer. Generally speaking (and there are variations in ranking and nomenclature between posts and positions), Counsellors are represented by BB4 officers; Consuls and First and Second Secretaries are BB3 officers and Third Secretaries and Vice Consuls are BB2 officers. DFAT only posts a limited number of low-level BB1 staff abroad. In large Australian missions an SES officer who is not the head of mission could be posted with the rank of Minister.

=== Brazil ===
The Brazilian Foreign Service (Serviço Exterior Brasileiro) is made up of three careers: the Diplomat Career, the Chancery Officer Career and the Chancery Assistant Career.

- Assistente de Chancelaria (Chancery Assistants / Attaché) are career civil servants with a minimum high-school degree who provide technical and administrative support in Brazil and in Brazilian representations abroad.
- Oficial de Chancelaria (Chancery Officers / Attaché) are career civil servants with a minimum university degree who contribute for the formulation, implementation and execution of acts of technical analysis and administrative management, necessary for the development of Brazilian foreign policy.
- Diplomata (Diplomat) are career civil servants responsible for diplomatic and consular activities, in their specific aspects of representation, negotiation, information and protection of Brazilian interests in the international field.

There are no ranks in the Chancery Assistant or Chancery Officer careers, nor a hierarchy between careers. However, when working abroad, it is common for Chancery Assistants and Chancery Officers to be assigned to sensitive functions, such as the Vice-Consul, and/or as Head of Sectors such as administration, accounting, communications, processing of political, commercial, diplomatic or consular information.

There are six ranks in the Diplomat career, in hierarchical order:

- Terceiro(a)-Secretário(a) ("Third secretary")
- Segundo(a)-Secretário(a) ("Second secretary")
- Primeiro(a)-Secretário(a) ("First secretary")
- Conselheiro(a) ("Counsellor")
- Ministro(a) de Segunda Classe ("Minister, second class")
- Ministro(a) de Primeira Classe ("Minister, first class", usually referred to as 'Ambassador')

Embaixador / Embaixadora is the honorary dignity conceded permanently when a Minister of First Class assumes a Post overseas. It can also be a temporary assignment, when carried on by a lower-rank diplomat or Brazilian politician of high level.

=== China ===
The ranks of the Ministry of Foreign Affairs of the People's Republic of China are defined by the Law on Diplomatic Personnel Stationed Abroad, passed in 2009 by the National People's Congress:

- Attaché (Simplified Chinese: 随员; Pinyin: suíyuán)
- Third Secretary (三等秘书; sānděng mìshū)
- Second Secretary (二等秘书; èrděng mìshū)
- First Secretary (一等秘书; yīděng mìshū)
- Counselor (参赞; cānzàn)
- Minister (公使; gōngshǐ)
- Ambassador (大使; dàshǐ)

=== Egypt ===
The following ranks are used in the Egyptian Ministry of Foreign Affairs:

- Diplomatic Attaché
- Third Secretary
- Second Secretary
- First Secretary
- Counselor
- Minister Plenipotentiary
- Ambassador

=== France ===
There are five ranks in the French Diplomatic Service: (in ascending order)

- Secrétaire de chancellerie
- Secrétaire des affaires étrangères (du cadre général or else du cadre d'Orient)
- Conseiller des affaires étrangères (du cadre général or else du cadre d'Orient)
- Ministre plénipotentiaire, the most common rank for heads of mission, but it also applies to some ministers-counsellors in important embassies
- Ambassadeur de France, an honorary dignity

There are two additional ranks for ICT specialists (also in ascending order):

- Secrétaire des systèmes d'information et de communication
- Attaché des systèmes d'information et de communication

=== Germany ===
The German Foreign Service uses a rank system that is connected to that of the rest of the civil administration and to military ranks through a common pay table. All ranks also occur in female form.

Diplomatic rank in: Foreign Office, embassies, consulates	Pay grade	Military rank equivalent
Konsulatssekretäranwärter	aspirant	officer candidate
Konsulatssekretär	A 9	2nd lieutenant
Konsulatssekretär 1. Klasse	A 10	1st lieutenant
Regierungsamtmann, Kanzler	A 11	Captain
Amtsrat, Kanzler 1. Klasse	A 12	Captain
Oberamtsrat, Kanzler 1. Klasse, Konsul	A 13	Stabshauptmann
Attaché	aspirant	-
Legationsrat	A 13	Major
Legationsrat Erster Klasse, Konsul Erster Klasse	A 14	Lieutenant colonel
Vortragender Legationsrat, Botschaftsrat	A 15	Lieutenant colonel
Vortragender Legationsrat Erster Klasse, Botschaftsrat Erster Klasse	A 16 - B 3	Colonel
Gesandter, Generalkonsul	A 16 - B 6 according to importance	Colonel - Brigadier general
Botschafter	A 15 - B 9 according to importance	Lieutenant colonel - Lieutenant general

=== Greece ===
The Greek Foreign Service uses a system initially modelled after military ranks. All ranks correspond to the Diplomatic Branch's rank and pay by law, albeit their functions are largely different.

Hellenic Army equivalent	Diplomatic Branch	Economic and Commercial Affairs Branch	Experts Branch	Special Legal Service
Lieutenant general	Ambassador	no equivalent	no equivalent	no equivalent
Major general	First Minister Plenipotentiary	First General Counsel for Economic and Commercial Affairs	First Expert Ambassador - Councilor	Special Legal Advisor and First Legal Advisor
Brigadier general	Second Minister Plenipotentiary	Second General Counsel for Economic and Trade Affairs	Second Expert Ambassador - Councilor	Second Legal Advisor
Colonel	First Embassy Councilor	First Councilor for Economic and Trade Affairs	First Expert - Councilor	Deputy Legal Advisor
Lieutenant colonel	Second Embassy Councilor	Second Councilor for Economic and Trade Affairs	Second Expert - Councilor	no equivalent
Major	First Embassy Secretary	First Secretary for Economic and Trade Affairs	no equivalent	Rapporteur
Captain	Second Embassy Secretary	Second Secretary for Economic and Trade Affairs	no equivalent	no equivalent
First lieutenant	Third Embassy Secretary	Third Secretary for Economic and Trade Affairs	no equivalent	no equivalent
Second lieutenant	Embassy Attaché	Economic and Trade Affairs Attaché	no equivalent	no equivalent

Diplomatic Branch	Communications Branch
First Minister Plenipotentiary	First Communications General Counsel
Second Minister Plenipotentiary	Second Communications General Counsel
First Embassy Councilor	First Communications Councilor
Second Embassy Councilor	Second Communications Councilor
First Embassy Secretary	First Communications Secretary
Second Embassy Secretary	Second Communications Secretary
Third Embassy Secretary	Third Communications Secretary
Embassy Attaché	Communications Attache

=== Hungary ===
The ranks at the Hungarian Foreign Service are the following.:

- Segédattasé – Assistant Attaché
- Attasé – Attaché
- III. osztályú titkár- Third Secretary
- II. osztályú titkár – Second Secretary
- I. osztályú titkár – First Secretary
- II. osztály tanácsos – Second Counsellor
- I. osztályú tanácsos – First Counsellor
- Rendkívüli követ és meghatalmazott miniszter – Envoy Extraordinary and Minister Plenipotentiary
- Nagykövet - Ambassador

=== Italy ===
In Italy, ranks and functions are not exactly connected: each rank can cover several functions. Moreover, several exceptions apply.

- Segretario di legazione in prova ("Secretary of Legation in probation period"): 9-month training period at the beginning of the career (no other functions)
- Segretario di legazione ("Secretary of Legation"): second secretary at an embassy, head of vice-consulate, vice-consul
- Consigliere di legazione ("Counsellor of Legation"): counsellor at an embassy, consul (head of a first-class general consulate)
- Consigliere d'ambasciata ("Counsellor of Embassy"): first counsellor at an embassy, consul
- Ministro plenipotenziario ("Minister Plenipotentiary"): ambassador (as for functions), minister-counsellor at an embassy, head of a Directorate at the Ministry of Foreign Affairs
- Ambasciatore ("Ambassador"): ambassador (thus both as for the rank and for the functions), General Secretary or head of a Directorate at the Ministry of Foreign Affairs

There are about 30 people who hold the rank of Ambassador. Therefore, most of the about 150 Italian embassies or permanent representations are held by a Minister Plenipotentiary: traditionally, ambassadors are appointed to the most important representations, such as London, Paris, Washington, New Delhi and Peking embassies and representations to the UN in New York City and the EU in Brussels.

=== Mexico ===
After the merger of the Consular and Diplomatic Corps, the current grades of Mexican career diplomats are (in ascending order)

- Agregado Diplomático ("Diplomatic Attaché"): title held during the one-year training program at the Diplomatic School and an internship in the Ministry of Foreign Affairs.
- Tercer Secretario ("Embassy Secretary, Third Secretary").
- Segundo Secretario ("Embassy Secretary, Second Secretary").
- Primer Secretario ("Embassy Secretary, First Secretary").
- Consejero ("Counsellor").
- Ministro ("Minister").
- Embajador ("Ambassador").

There are additional ranks for Administrative specialists and Staff, this civil servants are also part of the Mexican Foreign Service.

- Coordinador Administrativo ("Administrative Coordinator")
- Agregado Administrativo A ("Administrative Attache A").
- Agregado Administrativo B ("Administrative Attache B").
- Agregado Administrativo C ("Administrative Attache C").
- Agregado Administrativo D ("Administrative Attache D").

=== Portugal ===
In ascending order, the five ranks of the Portuguese diplomatic career are, as defined in the Statute of the Diplomatic Career (Estatuto da Carreira Diplomática):

- Adido de embaixada ("Embassy Attaché")
- Secretário de embaixada ("Embassy Secretary")
- Conselheiro de embaixada ("Embassy Counsellor")
- Ministro plenipotenciário ("Minister Plenipotentiary")
- Embaixador ("Ambassador")

Ministers Plenipotentiary who have been in that rank for three or more years are called "Minister Plenipotentiary, First Class" (ministro plenipotenciário de 1.ª classe), those who have been in the rank for less than three years are called "Minister Plenipotentiary, Second Class" (ministro plenipotenciário de 2.ª classe). Embassy Secretaries who have been in that rank for six years or more and in the diplomatic career for eight years or more are called "First Embassy Secretary" (primeiro-secretário de embaixada), those who have been in the rank for three years or more and for five years or more in the diplomatic career are called "Second Embassy Secretary" (segundo-secretário de embaixada), and those who have been in that rank for less than three years are called "Third Embassy Secretary" (terceiro-secretário de embaixada).

=== Russia ===
The diplomatic ranks in Russian Federation were introduced with enactment of the Federal Law of 27 July 2010 No.205-FZ. Diplomatic ranks are not to be confused with diplomatic positions (posts).

=== Singapore ===
The Singapore Foreign Service also has a merged Diplomatic and Consular Corps.

Its career diplomats and diplomatic support staff are split across two discrete career schemes, namely: (a) Foreign Service Officers; and (b) Foreign Service Administration Specialists.

Foreign Service Officers (FSOs)

FSOs are selected through multiple rounds of written and observational psychometric and neuropsychological evaluations. FSO candidates are typically drawn from graduates of the world's top universities. This is especially the case for candidates vying to be emplaced on the Political Track, of which only around 20 are recruited nationwide annually.

Regardless, most candidates who are eventually selected, possess degrees with First Class Honours from the world's top fifty universities (e.g. the University of Oxford or the University of Cambridge in the United Kingdom, many of the Ivy League institutions in the United States, or Singapore's two most prestigious universities - the National University of Singapore and the Nanyang Technological University).

Foreign Service Administration Specialists (FSASes)

FSASes, on the other hand, while still selected through some manner of written and observational assessments, are typically those bearing more conventional educational qualifications. These include graduates from top universities but without "good" honours, or from private and mainstream universities. A large number of FSASes also include Polytechnic graduates (who possess Diplomas).

Given the above, FSOs typically occupy the managerial positions, while FSASes generally perform more operational roles. [Note: FSOs are typically the diplomats, while FSASes serve as support staff.]

Officials from both schemes occupy billets at both the Singapore Ministry of Foreign Affairs, as well as Singapore's Overseas Missions (Embassies/High Commissions/Consulates-General/Consulates) - which number over 50.

Rank on Post

FSOs are posted to Singapore's overseas missions at the rank of Second Secretary, while FSASes are posted according to their substantive grades (typically ranging from Assistant Mission Support Officer to Attache - although in rare cases some senior FSASes may be promoted up to the rank of Third/Second/First Secretary). [Note: FSOs and FSASes are on discrete career tracks. Hence, even the rare FSAS who holds a senior diplomatic rank on post, will not enjoy a similar substantive grade or pay to that of an FSO.]

Regardless of rank, personnel are typically split across three tracks: (a) Political, (b) Administration and Consular, (c) Administration and Technical. Officers on the Political track take precedence over the rest, as all Heads of Mission (HOMs) or Deputy Chiefs of Mission (DCMs) are generally Political Officers. [Note: The Political track is reserved exclusively for FSOs.]

Other ministries and agencies

Personnel seconded from other government agencies receive different protocol-based suffixes and titles from those in the Foreign Service, which differ from the wider public and military services' ranks/grades and titles. For instance, a First Secretary (Economic) would represent a middle-manager of Senior Assistant Director-rank from the Ministry of Trade and Industry. While such persons may hold diplomatic status temporarily, they are not considered to be part of the career Foreign Service.

Diplomatic rank	Consular Rank	Military rank equivalent (by protocol)	Notes
Ambassador / High Commissioner			[Note: An Ambassador / High Commissioner / Consul-General in his country of post would take precedence over any Singapore military officer, by protocol.]
	Consul-General	Major General (MG)	[Note: An Ambassador / High Commissioner / Consul-General in his country of post would take precedence over any Singapore military officer, by protocol.]
Minister-Counsellor		Brigadier General (BG)	Political-Track FSOs of this rank usually concurrently hold the DCM appointment in larger Missions.
Counsellor		Colonel (COL)	Political-Track FSOs of this rank usually concurrently hold the DCM appointment in larger Missions.
First Secretary	Consul	Senior Lieutenant Colonel (SLTC)/Lieutenant Colonel (LTC)	Political-Track FSOs of this rank usually concurrently hold the DCM appointment in smaller Missions (e.g. Consulates-General or Consulates).
Second Secretary	Vice-Consul	Lieutenant Colonel (LTC)/Major (MAJ)	Political-Track FSOs of this rank usually concurrently hold the DCM appointment in smaller Missions (e.g. Consulates-General or Consulates).
Third Secretary	Vice-Consul	Captain (CPT)	
Attache	Attache	Lieutenant / 2nd Lieutenant (LTA/2LT)	

Support staff rank	Notes
Mission Support Officer / Executive Officer	
Assistant Mission Support Officer	
Personal Assistant	
Consular Officer	Usually seconded from the Immigrations and Checkpoints Authority (ICA)
Consular Agent	

=== Spain ===
After the merger of the Consular and Diplomatic Corps, the current eight grades of Spanish career diplomats are (in ascending order):

- Funcionario en prácticas ("Trainee Diplomat"): title held during the one-year training program at the Diplomatic School.
- Secretario de Embajada de tercera clase ("Embassy Secretary, Third Class") or Secretary.
- Secretario de Embajada de segunda clase ("Embassy Secretary, Second Class")
- Secretario de Embajada de primera clase ("Embassy Secretary, First Class")
- Consejero or Canciller, lowest grade to be appointed Consul-General.
- Ministro Plenipotenciario de tercera clase ("Minister Plenipotentiary, Third Class") commonly known as Minister, lowest grade to be appointed Ambassador.
- Ministro Plenipotenciario de segunda clase ("Minister Plenipotentiary, Second Class")
- Ministro Plenipotenciario de primera clase ("Minister Plenipotentiary, First Class")
- Embajador de España ("Ambassador of Spain"): not all Spanish Ambassadors hold this grade, which is limited by law to 3% of the total Corps.

=== United Kingdom ===
His Majesty's Diplomatic Service differentiates between officers in the "Senior Management Structure" (SMS; equivalent to the Senior Civil Service grades of the Home Civil Service) and those in the "delegated grades". SMS officers are classified into four pay-bands, and will serve in the Foreign, Commonwealth and Development Office in London as (in descending order of seniority) Permanent Under-Secretary (O-10), Directors-General (O-9), Directors (O-8), and Heads of department or deputy directors (O-7).

Overseas Ambassadors and High Commissioners (in Commonwealth countries) are generally drawn from all four SMS bands (and the D7 delegated grade) depending on the size and importance of the mission, as are Consuls-General, Deputy Heads of Mission, and Counsellors in larger posts. (Deputy Heads of Mission at the most significant Embassies, for example those in Washington and in Paris, are known as Ministers.)

In the "delegated grades", officers are graded by number from 1 to 7; the grades are grouped into bands lettered A‑D (A1 and A2; B3; C4 and C5; and D6 and D7).

Overseas, A2 grade officers hold the title of Attache; B3‑grade officers are Third Secretaries; C4s are Second Secretaries; and C5s and D6s are First Secretaries. D7 officers are usually Counsellors in larger posts, Deputy Heads of Mission in medium-sized posts, or Heads of Mission in small posts.

=== United States ===
In the United States Foreign Service, the personnel system under which most U.S. diplomatic personnel are assigned, a system of personal ranks is applied which roughly corresponds to these diplomatic ranks. Personal ranks are differentiated as "Senior Foreign Service" (SFS) or "Member of the Foreign Service". Officers at these ranks may serve as ambassadors and occupy the most senior positions in diplomatic missions. The SFS ranks, in order from highest to lowest, are:

SFS rank	Equivalent military rank	Notes
Career Ambassador (FE-CA)	Four-star rank (O-10)	Awarded to career diplomats with extensive and distinguished service
Career Minister (FE-CM)	Three-star rank (O-9)	The highest regular senior rank
Minister Counselor (FE-MC)	Two-star rank (O-8)	
Counselor (FE-OC)	One-star rank (O-7)	

Members of the Foreign Service consist of five groups, including Foreign Service officers and Foreign Service specialists. Like officers in the U.S. military, Foreign Service officers are members of the Foreign Service who are commissioned by the President. Foreign Service specialists are technical leaders and experts, commissioned by the Secretary of State. Ranks descend from the highest, FS‑01, equivalent to a full Colonel in the military, to FS‑09, the lowest rank in the U.S. Foreign Service personnel system. (Most entry-level Foreign Service members begin at the FS‑05 or FS‑06 level.) Personal rank is distinct from and should not be confused with the diplomatic or consular rank assigned at the time of appointment to a particular diplomatic or consular mission.

Foreign Service Officer rank	Equivalent military rank
FS-01	Colonel (O-6)
FS-02	Lieutenant Colonel (O-5)
FS-03	Major (O-4)
FS-04	Captain (O-3)
FS-05	First Lieutenant (O-2)
FS-06	Second Lieutenant (O-1)

In a large mission, several Senior Diplomats may serve under the Ambassador as Minister-Counselors, Counselors, and First Secretaries; in a small mission, a diplomat may serve as the lone Counselor of Embassy.

== Consular counterpart ==
Most countries' consular corps are composed of career diplomats who are simply posted to Consulates/Consulates-General. In such situations, these career diplomats will hold consular ranks instead (ranking in descending order: consul-general, consul, vice-consul, consular agent; equivalents with consular immunity limited to official acts only include honorary consul-general, honorary consul, and honorary vice-consul. Other titles, including "vice consul-general", have existed in the past.) – although they are usually also given a diplomatic rank by the country. Consular ranks and responsibilities differ from country to country, and may also be used concurrently with diplomatic titles if the individual is assigned to an embassy. Diplomatic immunity is generally more limited for consular officials without other diplomatic accreditation, and is broadly limited to immunity with respect to their official duties.

While in the past, consular officials have often been more distant from the politically sensitive aspects of diplomacy, this is no longer necessarily the case, and career diplomats in consulates often perform the same roles as those in an embassy would. Some countries also routinely provide their embassy officials with consular commissions, including those without formal consular responsibilities, since a consular commission allows the individual to legalize documents, sign certain documents, and undertake certain other necessary functions.

Depending on the practice of the individual country, "consular services" may be limited to services provided for citizens or residents of the sending country, or extended to include, for example, visa services for nationals of the host country.

Sending nations may also designate incumbents of certain positions as holding consulary authority by virtue of their office, while lacking individual accreditation, immunity and inviolability. For example, 10 U.S.C. §§ 936 and 1044a identify various U.S. military officers (and authorize the service secretaries to identify others) who hold general authority as a notary and consul of the United States for, respectively, purposes of military administration and those entitled to military legal assistance. A nation may also declare that its senior merchant sea captain in a given foreign port—or its merchant sea captains generally—has consulary authority for merchant seamen.

== See also ==
- Agricultural attaché
- Apocrisiary
- Commissioner
- Consul
- Diplomatic mission
- Diplomatic service
- Envoy Extraordinary and Minister Plenipotentiary
- Goodwill Ambassador
- Internuncio, Nuncio
- Legate
- Minister–Secretary of State for Finland
