= List of 1st class Active State Councillors of the Russian Federation (2000–2004) =

1st class Active State Councillor of the Russian Federation (Russian: действительный государственный советник Российской Федерации 1 класса) is the highest federal state civilian service rank of Russia. The following list is a list of all persons who was promoted to this rank during the period 2000–2004:

- Sergey Say
- Vladimir Bezrukov
- Igor Savolsky
- Dmitry Medvedev
- Vladislav Surkov
- Alexander Voronin
- Valery Kirpichnikov
- Andrey Popov
- Vladimir Goman
- Vladimir Dimov
- Natalia Fonareva
- Alexander Abramov
- Vladimir Rakhmanin
- Anvar Shamuzafarov
- Andrey Zadernyuk
- Andrey Vinogradov
- Grigory Balykhin
- Vasily Zhurakovsky
- Alexander Kiselev
- Herman Gref
- Lyudmila Vartazarova
- Natalia Dementieva
- Igor Shchyogolev
- Mikhail Fradkov
- Yury Brusnitsyn
- Vladimir Isakov
- Anatoly Usov
- Viktor Cheremukhin
- Gennady Batanov
- Vladimir Pospelov
- Alexey Volin
- Aleksandra Levitskaya
- Konstantin Merzlikin
- Igor Astapkin
- Alexander Nozdrachev
- Vladimir Simonov
- Alexander Drazhnyuk
- Yury Pavlenko
- Vladimir Kuliechev
- Valentin Ivanov
- Anatoly Vyalkov
- Andrey Vavra
- Leonid Drachevsky
- Sergey Kiriyenko
- Dmitry Kozak
- Simon Kordonsky
- Konstantin Pulikovsky
- Zoya Novozhilova
- Alexander Korchagin
- Vyacheslav Kokunov
- Alexander Kozlov
- Igor Mogilat
- Boris Yurlov
- Sergey Dankvert
- Anatoly Mikhalev
- Igor Yusufov
- Anatoly Popov
- Mikhail Trinoga
- Georgy Poltavchenko
- Vladimir Mau
- Aleksandr Kosopkin
- Alexander Golutva
- Yuri Koptev
- Pavel Rozhkov
- Dmitry Koryavov
- Mikhail Seslavinsky
- Oksana Labutina
- Yury Algunov
- Pyotr Latyshev
- Alexey Ulyukaev
- Sergey Shatalov
- Vladimir Vinogradov
- Anatoly Chaus
- Alexander Malakhov
- Igor Porshnev
- Vyacheslav Soltaganov
- Oleg Buklemishev
- Mikhail Sinelin
- Sergey Grigorov
- Alexander Bespalov
- Mikhail Barshchevsky
- Vasily Arzhantsev
- Mikhail Kozlov
- Petr Tkachenko
- Vladimir Sokolin
- Alexander Grigoryev
- Alexander Neradko
- Vyacheslav Ruksha
- Igor Slyunyayev (since October 2014 — Igor Albin)
- Mikhail Dmitriev
- Elvira Nabiullina
- Mikhail Kalmykov
- Vitaly Menshikov
- Ivan Matlashov
- Leonid Tropko
- Boris Aleshin
- Viktor Zubkov
- Vladimir Yakunin
- Valery Buravchenko
- Galina Karelova
- Valery Yanvarev
- Viktor Bolotov
- Evald Antipenko
- Andrey Korotkov
- Mikhail Solonin
- Dmitry Aratsky
- Alexander Lotorev
- Sergey Kovalev
- Sergey Bolkhovitin
- Anatoly Vukolov
- Valery Soluyanov
- Abdul-Khakim Sultygov
- Valery Mikhaylov
- Igor Tsyganenko
- Natalya Timakova
- Sergey Gaydarzhi
- Boris Antonyuk
- Alexander Kiselev
- Alexander Brindikov
- Mikhail Kirpichnikov
- Sergey Vyazalov
- Tatyana Golikova
- Viacheslav Fetisov
- Vladimir Shumov
- Igor Borovkov
- Valery Parfenov
- Anton Drozdov
- Mikhail Kopeykin
- Garry Minkh
- Alexey Ardov
- Alexey Serko
- Alexander Beglov
- Arkady Dvorkovich
- Marina Entaltseva
- Dmitry Zhuykov
- Yuri Zubakov
- Dmitry Kalimulin
- Alexander Karlin
- Anatoly Kvashnin
- Ilya Klebanov
- Alexander Manzhosin
- Nikolay Spassky
- Igor Shuvalov

== See also ==
- State civilian and municipal service ranks in Russian Federation
