= List of 1st class Active State Councillors of the Russian Federation (2010–2014) =

1st class Active State Councillor of the Russian Federation (Russian: действительный государственный советник Российской Федерации 1 класса) is the highest federal state civilian service rank of Russia. This is a list of those promoted to this rank during 2010–2014:

- Eva Vasilevskaya
- Nikolay Konstantinov
- Alexey Kulakovsky
- Yury Sentyurin
- Vera Chistova
- Pavel Kyunnap
- Nadera Mukhomedzhan
- Sergey Khutortsev
- Andrey Yatskin
- Vladimir Puchkov
- Denis Manturov
- Yekaterina Chukovskaya
- Pavel Novikov
- Sergey Pavlenko
- Konstantin Panferov
- Sergey Aristov
- Alexander Arsenov
- Oleg Bochkarev
- Valery Voskoboynikov
- Yelena Kuleshova
- Konstantin Noskov
- Andrey Chobotov
- Alexander Sukhorukov
- Dmitry Chushkin
- Mikhail Mishustin
- Nikolay Kutiin
- Tatiana Shevtsova
- Viktor Tolokonsky
- Roman Artyukhin
- Dmitry Anosov
- Olga Bursova
- Alexey Konyushkov
- Alexander Yakushev
- Igor Yaremenko
- Anatoly Ledovskikh
- Alexander Safonov
- Nikolay Pankov
- Alexander Surinov
- Dmitry Bezdelov
- Oleg Belozyorov
- Andrey Krotov
- Alexander Khlunov
- Oleg Chepyakov
- Andrey Ulanov
- Andrey Belousov
- Alexey Popov
- Andrey Sharov
- Sergey Gerasimov
- Vladimir Selin
- Yevgeny Kuyvashev
- Konstantin Kostin
- Igor Nagorny
- Alexander Volosov
- Sergei Ivanov
- Pavel Astakhov
- Vyacheslav Volodin
- Mikhail Babich
- Marina Seliverstova
- Yevgeny Zabarchuk
- Vladimir Uyba
- Alexander Davydenko
- Andrey Baklanov
- Oleg Morozov
- Vladislav Kitaev
- Vladimir Kikot
- Mikhail Bryukhanov
- Andrei Fursenko
- Georgy Kalamanov
- Alexey Lavrov
- Yury Trutnev
- Andrei Klepach
- Alexander Gladyshev
- Andrey Komzolov
- Kseniya Yudaeva
- Andrey Lipov
- Dmitry Pankin
- Alexander Frolov
- Semyon Levi
- Nikolay Popov
- Alexey Seregin
- Anton Kobyakov
- Pavel Zenkovich
- Viktor Ivanov
- Alexey Rakhmanov
- Vladimir Kirillov
- Igor Karavaev
- Magomedsalam Magomedov
- Ivan Lobanov
- Elmir Tagirov
- Viktor Kruchinin
- Alexey Zaklyazminsky
- Viktor Dmitriev
- Vladislav Fedulov
- Igor Smirnov
- Vladimir Popovkin
- Dmitry Aristov
- Andrey Soroko
- Fedor Smuglin
- Jeanna Odintsova
- Vladimir Simonenko
- Georgy Verenich
- Alexander Potapov
- Igor Levitin
- Igor Kholmanskikh
- Vitaly Azarov
- Tatyana Blinova
- Yury Borisov
- Oleg Dukhovnitsky
- Igor Zubov
- Grigory Ivliev
- Natalya Parshikova
- Alexey Ferapontov
- Grigory Elkin
- Artur Muravyov
- Yury Averyanov
- Oleg Plokhoy
- Marina Lastochkina
- Yury Mikhaylov
- Alexander Sinenko
- Natalya Antipina
- Anatoly Antonov
- Sergey Velmyaykin
- Dmitry Gogin
- Marat Kambolov
- Alexey Likhachev
- Igor Manylov
- Nadezhda Sinikova
- Irina Antekhina
- Mikhail Buben
- Oleg Belaventsev
- Inna Bilenkina
- Alexander Golublev
- Ilya Yelizarov
- Nikolay Reshetnikov
- Vasily Kopylov
- Konstantin Romodanovsky
- Sergey Melikov
- Nikolay Rogozhkin
- Sergey Shlyakov
- Yelena Shipileva
- Valery Sidorenko
- Dmitry Stupakov
- Andrey Artizov
- Rinat Gizatulin
- Anton Inyutsyn

== See also ==
- State civilian and municipal service ranks in Russian Federation
