= Mikhail Krotov =

Russian lawyer, businessman and official (born 1963)

- Михаил Кротов
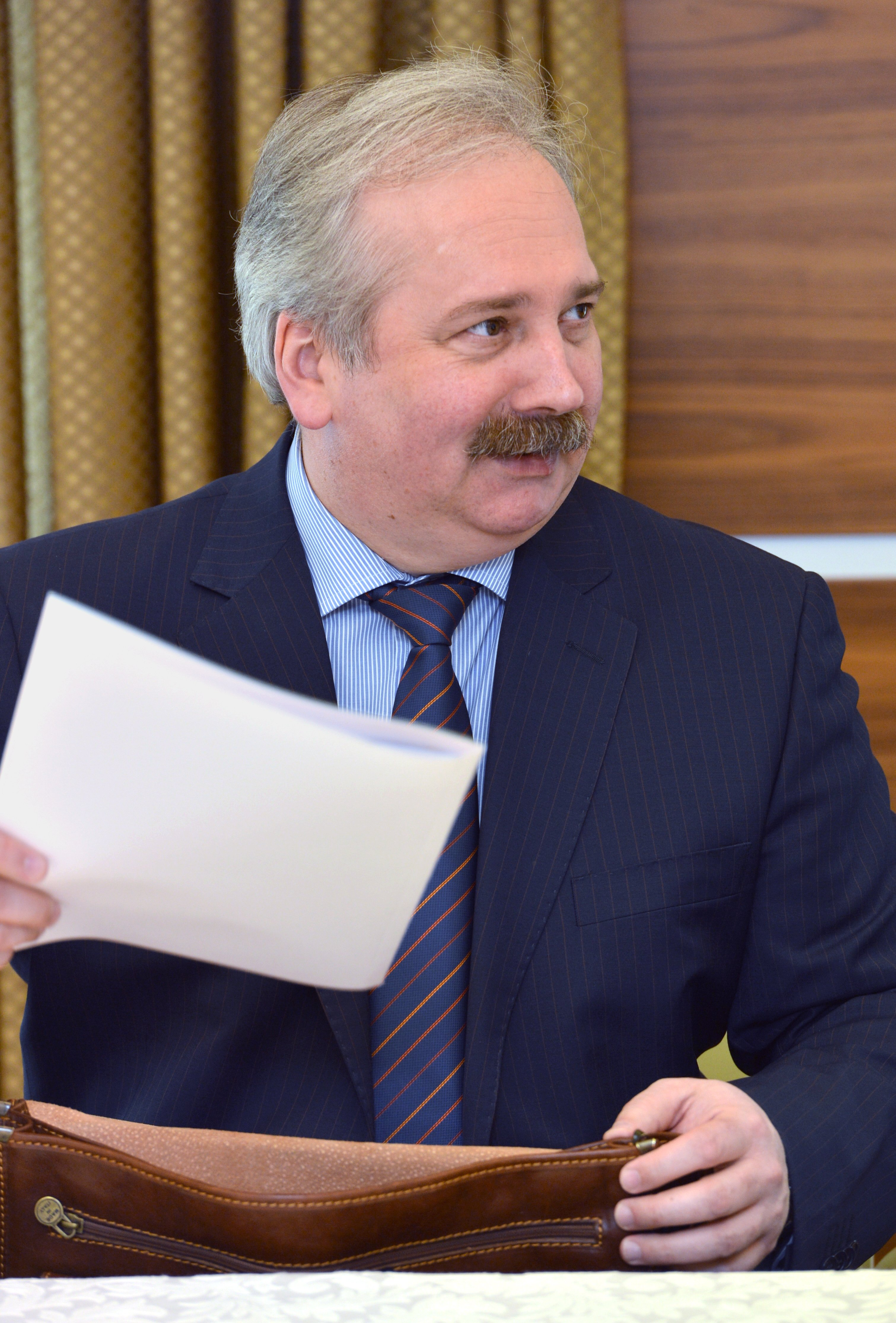
- Krotov in 2013

Judge of the Supreme Court of Russia
- Incumbent
- Assumed office 24 July 2020

Presidential Plenipotentiary Representative in the Constitutional Court
- In office 7 November 2005 – 31 January 2020
- President: Vladimir Putin; Dmitry Medvedev; Vladimir Putin
- Preceded by: Mikhail Mityukov
- Succeeded by: Aleksandr Konovalov

Personal details
- Born: 14 March 1963 (age 63) Leningrad, USSR
- Education: LSU Faculty of Law
- Occupation: lawyer, businessman

Mikhail Valentinovich Krotov (Russian: Михаил Валентинович Кротов; born March 14, 1963) is a Russian lawyer, businessman and official. He has the federal state civilian service rank of 1st class Active State Councillor of the Russian Federation.

== Career ==
On April 28, 1995 he was elected deputy chairman of the board of directors of the Baltic Sea Steamship Company. On October 2, 1995 as the Chairman Ivan Lushchinsky had been shot dead, Krotov became the chairman of its board of directors and held this position until summer 1996.

In 2005 he was a first deputy director general of the Gazprom Media holding.

Since November 7, 2005 he has been President Vladimir Putin's envoy to the Constitutional Court of the Russian Federation. He was succeeded by former Justice Minister Aleksandr Konovalov in January 2020.

In July 2020 Krotov was appointed judge of the Supreme Court by the Federation Council. He is a member of the Judicial Chamber for Civil Cases.

Since 2007 he has been working at the Higher School of Economics. He is a professor of the Department of Civil Law at the Faculty of Law.

Mikhail is the author of more than 35 scientific publications on civil and maritime law. He wrote comments on the Civil and Labor Codes of the Russian Federation.

== Awards and honours ==
- 2018 – Order of Alexander Nevsky
- 2012 – Order of Friendship
- 2010 – Honored Lawyer of the Russian Federation
- 2001 – Award winner of the President of the Russian Federation in the field of education for 2001
- 2007 – Award winner of the Government of the Russian Federation in the field of education for 2007
- 2008 – Order of Honour
- 1999 – A.F. Koni Medal of the Ministry of Justice of the Russian Federation
- Honorary worker of higher professional education

== Family ==
Mikhail Krotov is married. He has two sons.
