= List of 1st class Active State Councillors of the Russian Federation (2015–2019) =

1st class Active State Councillor of the Russian Federation (Russian: действительный государственный советник Российской Федерации 1 класса) is the highest federal state civilian service rank of Russia. The following list is a list of all persons who was promoted to this rank during the period 2015–2019:

- Alexander Petrikov
- Roman Starovoyt
- Vladimir Artamonov
- Natalia Udalova
- Sergey Vasiliev
- Alexey Vovchenko
- Pavel Korolev
- Alexander Plutnik
- Oleg Fomichev
- Tatyana Voronova
- Mikhail Kashtan
- Alexey Uvarov
- Alexey Abramov
- Gulnaz Kadyrova
- Gleb Nikitin
- Alexander Povalko
- Sergey Tsyb
- Lev Sherbakov
- Odes Baysultanov
- Valentina Stukalova
- Alexander Savenkov
- Alexander Kolpakov
- Nikolay Abroskin
- Pavel Fradkov
- Maxim Akimov
- Liana Pepelyaeva
- Ivan Kharchenko
- Sergey Menyaylo
- Anna Kulikova
- Nikolay Tsukanov
- Andrey Yarin
- Nikolay Arkhipov
- Oleg Frolov
- Svetlana Radchenko
- Yekaterina Yegorova
- Sergey Novikov
- Oleg Savelyev
- Nikolay Asaul
- Grigory Lekarev
- Marina Tomilova
- Ilya Shestakov
- Vladimir Stepanov
- Sergey Bulavin
- Andrey Slepnev
- Yevgeny Dietrich
- Viktor Yevtukhov
- Lyubov Yeltsova
- Yury Zubarev
- Alla Manilova
- Andrey Pudov
- Alexander Matveev
- Igor Diveykin
- Olga Sitnikova
- Marina Volkova
- Oleg Martyanov
- Viktor Basargin
- Pavel Volkov
- Sergey Nazarov
- Alexander Kharichev
- Dmitry Verbovoy
- Igor Zadvornov
- Andrey Cherezov
- Alexander Yurchik
- Alexander Gutsan
- Igor Komarov
- Igor Neverov
- Anatoly Kirienko
- Alexey Aleshin
- Anna Popova
- Savva Shipov
- Timur Ivanov
- Vladimir Lozbinev
- Alexey Filatov
- Sergey Martynov
- Yevgeny Derbenev
- Olga Krivonos
- Vadim Filatov
- Yury Gordeev
- Leonid Gornin
- Vadim Zhivulin
- Alexey Moiseev
- Vasily Osmakov
- Irina Potekhina
- Ilya Trunin
- Vladimir Chepets
- Tatyana Lokatkina
- Mikhail Popov
- Olga Sergun

== See also ==
- State civilian and municipal service ranks in Russian Federation
