= Aleksandr Konovalov (judge) =

Russian lawyer

- Александр Коновалов
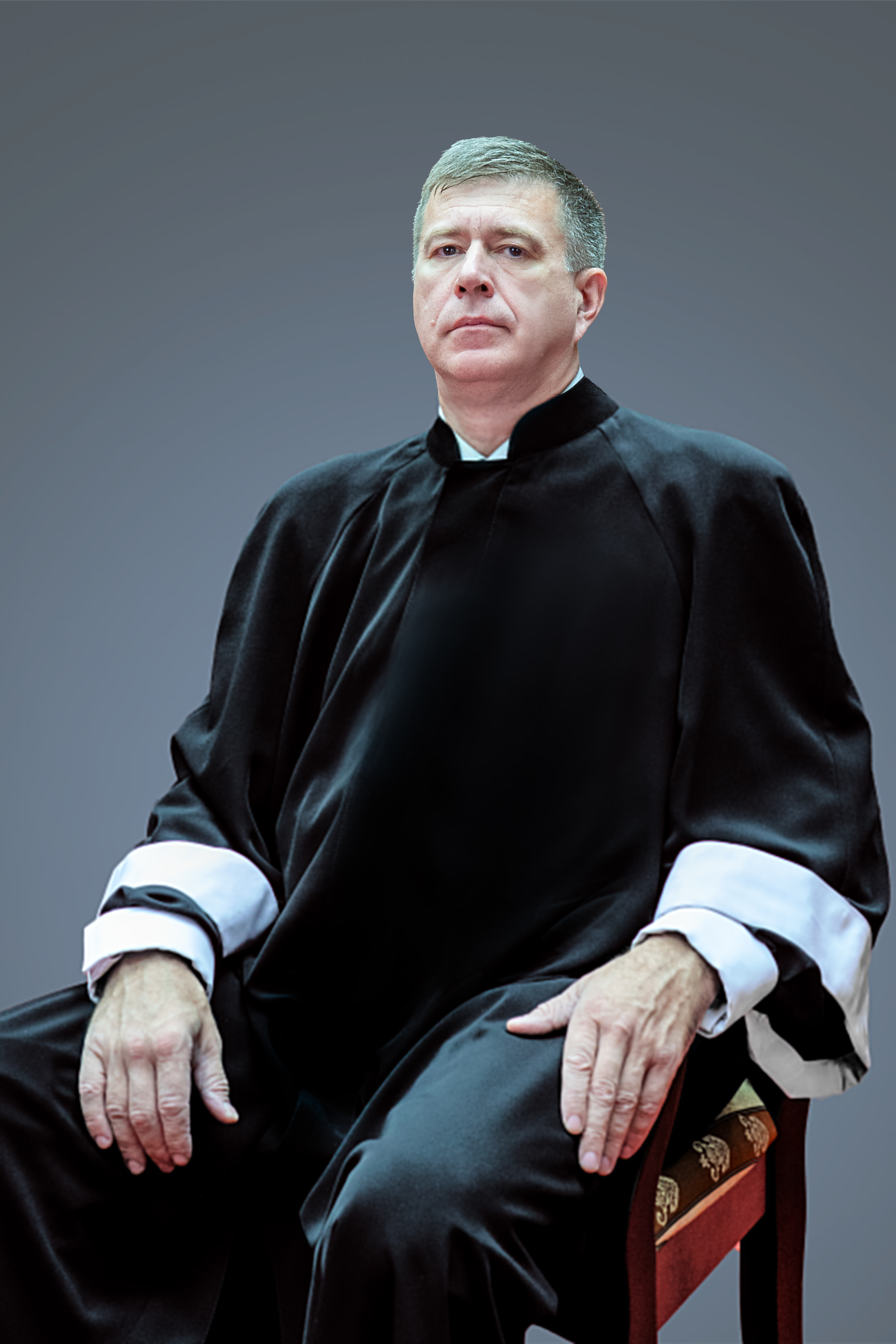
- Official portrait, 2025

Deputy President of the Constitutional Court
- Incumbent
- Assumed office 1 October 2026
- Nominated by: Vladimir Putin
- Preceded by: Lyudmila Zharkova

Judge of the Constitutional Court
- Incumbent
- Assumed office 16 April 2025
- Nominated by: Vladimir Putin

Presidential Plenipotentiary Representative in the Constitutional Court
- In office 31 January 2020 – 16 April 2025
- President: Vladimir Putin
- Preceded by: Mikhail Krotov
- Succeeded by: Dmitry Mezentsev

Minister of Justice
- In office 12 May 2008 – 15 January 2020; Acting: 15 January 2020 – 21 January 2020
- Prime Minister: Vladimir Putin; Viktor Zubkov (acting); Dmitry Medvedev; Mikhail Mishustin
- Preceded by: Vladimir Ustinov
- Succeeded by: Konstantin Chuychenko

Presidential Envoy to the Volga Federal District
- In office 14 November 2005 – 12 May 2008
- President: Vladimir Putin
- Preceded by: Sergey Kiriyenko
- Succeeded by: Grigory Rapota

Prosecutor of the Republic of Bashkortostan
- In office 29 February 2005 – 14 November 2005
- Governor: Murtaza Rakhimov
- Preceded by: Florid Baikov; Mikhail Zelepukin (acting)
- Succeeded by: Sergey Khurtin

Personal details
- Born: 6 September 1968 (age 58) Leningrad, Russian SFSR, Soviet Union (now Saint Petersburg, Russia)
- Party: United Russia
- Education: Saint Petersburg State University; Saint Tikhon's Orthodox University

Aleksandr Vladimirovich Konovalov (Russian: Алекса́ндр Влади́мирович Конова́лов; born 9 June 1968) is a Russian lawyer and statesman serving as the judge of the Constitutional Court of Russia since 2025 and its deputy president since 2026. From May 2008 to January 2020, he served as Minister of Justice.

He has the federal state civilian service ranks of 1st class Active State Councillor of the Russian Federation and Active State Councillor of Justitia of the Russian Federation.

== Early life and education ==
Konovalov was born 9 June 1968 in Leningrad. From 1986 to 1988, he completed compulsory military service in the Armed Forces of the Soviet Union. In 1992, he graduated from the Saint Petersburg State University Faculty of Law. While working at the prosecutor's office, he pursued extramural studies at the Saint Tikhon's Orthodox University, where he received a degree in Eastern Orthodox theology.

In 1999, he defended his Candidate of Sciences thesis titled "Possession and Possessory Protection in Civil Law" at Saint Petersburg State University. In 2019, he earned his Doctor of Sciences degree from the Kutafin Moscow State Law University, having defended his thesis on "Principles of Civil Law: Methodological and Practical Aspects of Research".

== Career ==
From 1992 to 2005 Konovalov served in Saint Petersburg prosecutor's office as assistant prosecutor of the Vyborgsky District (1992), investigator (1992–1994), Prosecutor of the Department for Oversight of Federal Security Laws Enforcement (1994–1997), Deputy Prosecutor of the Moskovsky District (1997–1998), Prosecutor of the Moskovsky District (1998–2001), and First Deputy Prosecutor (2001–2005), consequentially.

From February to November 2005 he was the chief prosecutor of the Republic of Bashkortostan.

Between 14 November 2005 and May 2008, he had been President Vladimir Putin's Plenipotentiary Envoy to the Volga Federal District. In May 2008 he was appointed the Minister of Justice in Putin's second cabinet. On 1 July 2008, he was appointed Special Presidential Envoy for Cooperation with the European Union in the Field of Freedom, Security, and Justice. He remained in office during Medvedev's first and second cabinets.

On 15 January 2020, Konovalov resigned as part of the cabinet, after President Vladimir Putin delivered the Presidential Address to the Federal Assembly, in which he proposed several amendments to the Constitution.

On 31 January 2020, Konovalov was appointed Presidential Plenipotentiary Representative to the Constitutional Court of Russia.

On 3 April 2025, President Putin nominated Konovalov for judge of the Constitutional Court of Russia. On 16 April 2025, the Federation Council appointed him judge of the Constitutional Court.

== Awards ==
- Order of Honour
- Order "For Merit to the Fatherland", 4th class
- Order of Friendship
- Order of Holy Prince Daniel of Moscow, 2nd class

== References and notes ==
Political offices
Preceded by Vladimir Ustinov	Minister of Justice; 2008–2020	Succeeded by Konstantin Chuychenko
