= List of 1st class Active State Councillors of the Russian Federation (2020–2024) =

1st class Active State Councillor of the Russian Federation (Russian: действительный государственный советник Российской Федерации 1 класса) is the highest federal state civilian service rank of Russia. The following list is a list of all persons who was promoted to this rank during the period 2020–2024:

- Vladimir Medinsky
- Maxim Oreshkin
- Yury Chaika
- Anastasia Bondarenko
- Alexey Semyonov
- Alexander Grebenkin
- Tatyana Matveeva
- Svetlana Andryushchenko
- Alexander Vishnyakov
- Tatyana Vorobieva
- Pavel Livadny
- Vladimir Tokarev
- Vitaly Semikin
- Yevgeny Komar
- Viktor Kuznetsov
- Nadezhda Samoylova
- Vasily Toloko
- Vasily Trestsov
- Igor Barinov
- Daniil Yegorov
- Sergey Levin
- Oleg Ryazantsev
- Andrey Kazakov
- Vladimir Yakushev
- Oleg Salagay
- Oleg Skufinsky
- Natalya Khorova
- Yevgeny Grabchak
- Dmitry Zverev
- Tatyana Ilyushnikova
- Ivan Lebedev
- Igor Shumakov
- Alexander Krasko
- Alexey Krivoruchko
- Dmitry Shugaev
- Igor Maslov
- Nikolay Paruzin
- Mikhail Ivankov
- Yevgeny Kamkin
- Pavel Malkov
- Pavel Pugachev
- Igor Kagramanyan
- Kirill Lysogorsky
- Boris Nakonechny
- Pavel Stepanov
- Natalya Bocharova
- Murad Kerimov
- Alexander Narukavnikov
- Svetlana Radionova
- Alexey Sklyar
- Olga Yarilova
- Andrey Gurovich
- Yury Kokov
- Alexander Valyaev
- Eldar Muslimov
- Yelena Rozhkova
- Natalya Savina
- Olga Chepurina
- Igor Shevchenko
- Andrey Nikolaev
- Alexander Trembitsky
- Olga Lyakina
- Viktor Ageev
- Olga Bobrova
- Vadim Ivanov
- Yevgeny Lisyutin
- Alexander Bugaev
- Alexander Poshivay
- Alexander Ivanov
- Alexey Gruzdev
- Sergey Obryvalin
- Valery Tikhonov
- Dmitry Kapnik
- Pavel Snikkars
- Alexander Gribov
- Dmitry Kirillov
- Vladimir Kolychev
- Alexey Khersontsev

== See also ==
- State civilian and municipal service ranks in Russian Federation
