= Investigative Committee of Russia =

Investigative authority of Russia

Investigative Committee of the Russian Federation Следственный комитет Российской Федерации Sledstvyennyy komitet Rossiyskoy Federatsii
- Emblem of the Investigative Committee

- Flag of Russian Investigative Committee
- Abbreviation: SK Rossii, SKR

Agency overview
- Formed: January 2011
- Preceding agency: Investigative Committee under the Office of the Prosecutor General
- Employees: 19,156

Jurisdictional structure
- Federal agency: RUS
- Operations jurisdiction: RUS
- General nature: Federal law enforcement; Civilian police

Operational structure
- Overseen by: Presidential Administration of Russia
- Headquarters: Bauman Street, Moscow
- Elected officer responsible: Alexander Bastrykin, Chairman
- Agency executive: Vladimir Putin, President of Russia
- Child agency: Military Investigative Committee

Website
- http://www.sledcom.ru/

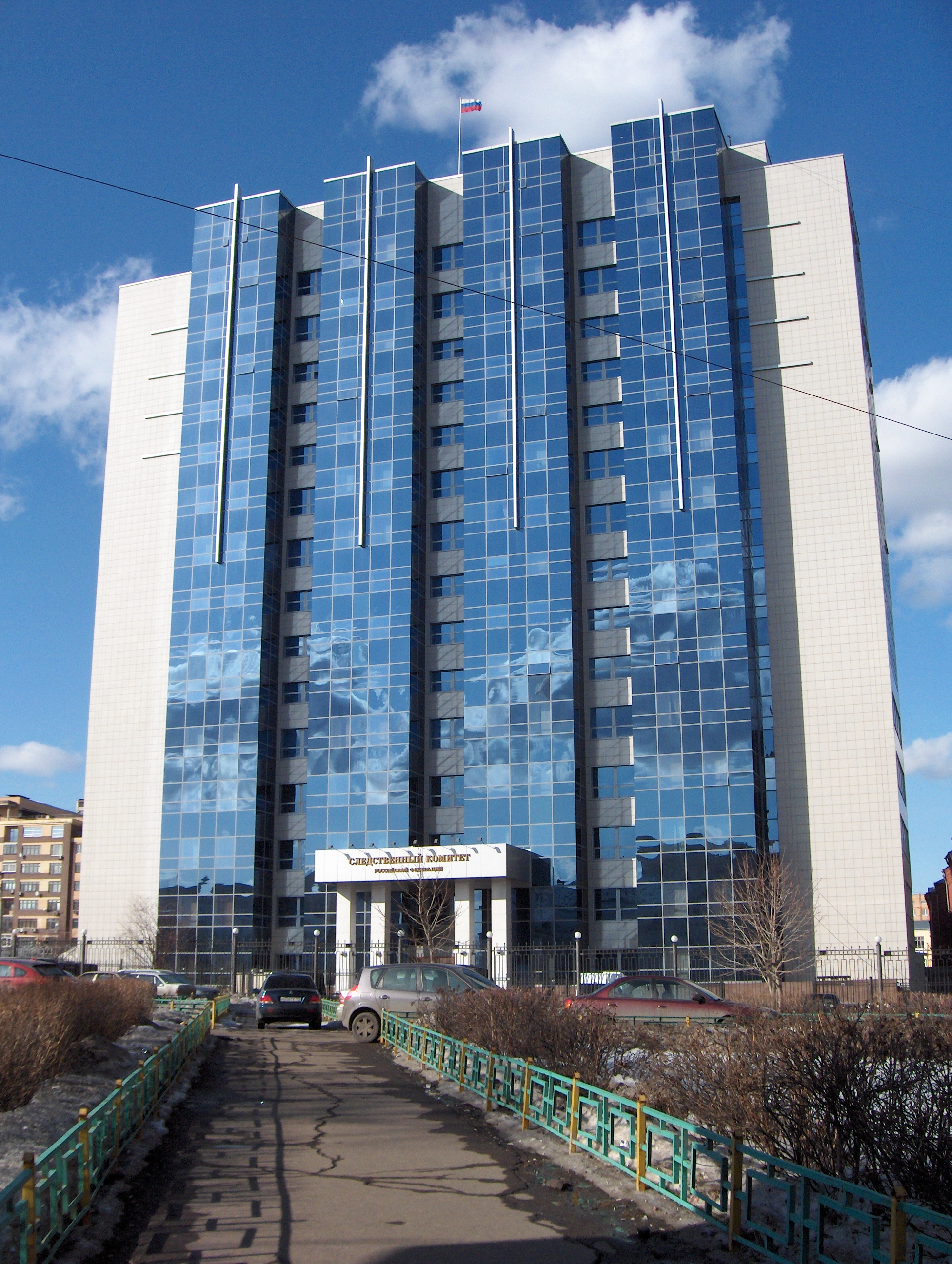
Investigative Committee Headquarters in Bauman Street, Moscow

The Investigative Committee of the Russian Federation (ICRF; Russian: Сле́дственный комите́т Росси́йской Федера́ции, romanized: Sledstvyennyy komitet Rossiyskoy Federatsii) has been the main federal bureau for investigation in Russia since January 2011. Its name (Следственный комитет, Sledstvyennyy komitet) is usually abbreviated to SKR (СКР or СК России) or Sledcom (Следком, Sledkom). The agency replaced the Russian prosecutor general's Investigative Committee and operates as Russia's anti-corruption agency. It is answerable to the president of Russia and has statutory responsibility for inspecting the police forces, combating police corruption and police misconduct and is responsible for conducting investigations into local authorities and federal governmental bodies.

On January 21, 2011, President Dmitry Medvedev signed a decree appointing Alexander Bastrykin, then the acting chair of the prosecutor general's Investigative Committee, as Sledkom's chairperson.

In 2012 President Medvedev began to discuss the possibility of creating a Federal Anti-Corruption Bureau under Sledkom, as part of the campaign against corruption and to combat corruption in the Police of Russia.

== Number of employees ==
The number of agents in the Investigative Committee (except the military investigative agents) is 19,156 employees, and from January 1, 2012, need to be 21,156 employees. The number of the Military Investigators is now 2,034 employees.

According to the 2012 Law on Amendments to some Legislative Acts of the Russian Federation in connection with improving the structure of Preliminary Investigation, it will expand to 60,000 staff, largely by taking over most of the investigators of the Ministry of Internal Affairs and the Federal Drug Control Service.

== Management ==
=== Chairman of the Investigative Committee ===
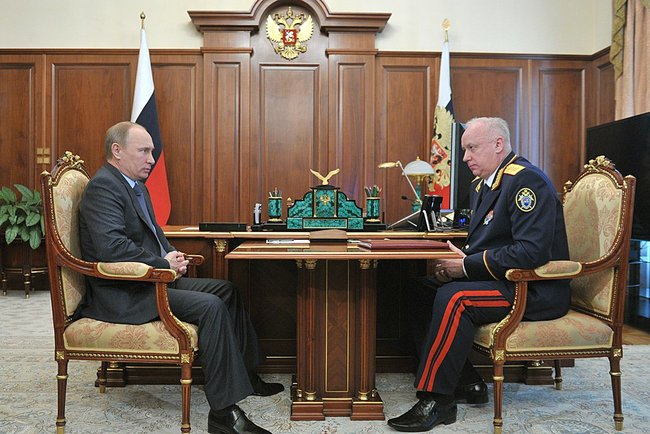
Russian president Vladimir Putin and Alexander Bastrykin on 21 February 2013

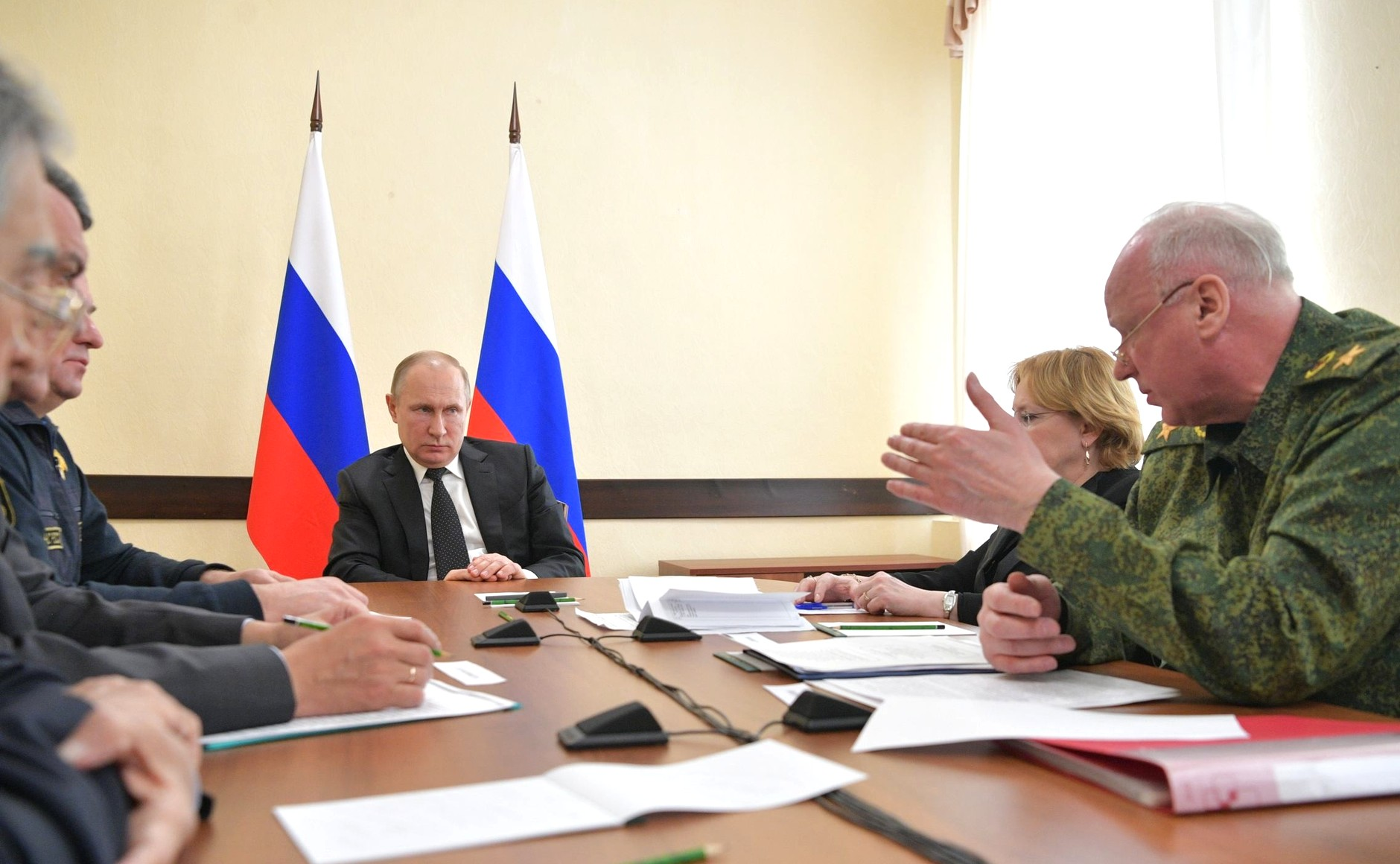
Putin and Bastrykin on 27 March 2018

On January 21, 2011, President Dmitry Medvedev signed a decree appointing Alexander Bastrykin, then the acting chair of the prosecutor general's Investigative Committee, as chairperson of the federal investigation agency.

=== Vice-Chairmen ===
- Sorochkin Alexander, Vice-Chairman of the Investigative Committee of the Russian Federation – Head of the Main Military Investigation Department (since January 15, 2011; by Presidential decree No. 372)
- Nyrkov Yuri Mikhailovich (since January 15, 2011; by Presidential decree No. 422)
- Piskarev Vasily (since January 15, 2011; by Presidential decree No. 422)
- Leonenko Yelena (since January 15, 2011; by Presidential decree No. 422)
- Karnaukhov Boris (since January 15, 2011; by Presidential decree No. 422)

== Structure ==
The structure of the Central Administration of the Investigative Committee of the Russian Federation includes:

- Central Investigation Department
  - Office for the investigation of particularly important cases involving crimes against persons and public safety
  - Office for the investigation of particularly important cases involving crimes against the state and the economy
- Office of methodological and analytical support
- Department of Information Technology and Document Support
- Main Military Investigation Department
- General Directorate of procedural controls
- Directorate of procedural control of the investigating authorities
- Directorate of procedural control in the sphere of combating corruption
- Directorate of procedural control over the investigation of particularly important cases
- Organizational and Analytical Department
- Division Document Processing
- The main organizational and Inspections Department
- Organizational Accountability Office
- Information and methodological Directorate
- Directorate for Internal Security
- Operational services Directorate
- Document Processing Division and proofreading
- General Directorate of Forensic
- Methodical and forensic Directorate
- Technical and forensic Directorate
- Organization of forensic
- Division Document Processing
- The main software control of the Investigative Committee of the Russian Federation
- Economic and Financial Division
- Logistics
- Administration
- Audit Bureau
- Department management activities for the North Caucasus and Southern Federal Districts
  - Department of organizational and documentation support
- Central Investigation Department of the North Caucasus Federal District
  - Office for the investigation of particularly important cases
  - Control and management of forensic
  - Department of interagency cooperation, and physical protection
  - Organizational and Analytical Department
  - Division Document Processing
- Investigation Department of the Central Federal District
- Investigation Department of the North-West Federal District
- Investigation Department of the Volga Federal District
- Investigation Department of the Ural Federal District
- Investigation Department of the Siberian Federal District
- Investigation Department of the Far East Federal District
- Investigation Department of the Southern Federal District
- Personnel department
- The Legal Department
- Directorate for the interaction with the media
- Office of International Legal Cooperation
- The Office for consideration of applications of citizens and Documentation Assistant
- Office for the Protection of State Secrets
- Office of Physical Protection
- Department of procedural control over the investigation of particularly important cases in the federal districts

The investigative departments of subjects of Russian Federation are subordinated to the Investigative Committee, and the investigative divisions of cities and raions are subordinated to the investigative departments of subjects of Russian Federation. There are specialized investigative departments (investigative departments on transport, investigative department of Baikonur Cosmodrome) which are subordinated to the Investigative Committee and have own subordinated investigative divisions. Finally, there is the Chief Military Investigative Department which is subordinated to the Investigative Committee and have own subordinated military investigative departments (military investigative department of Western Military District, military investigative department of Eastern Military District, military investigative department of Southern Military District, military investigative department of Central Military District, military investigative department of Northern Fleet, military investigative department of Baltic Fleet, military investigative department of Black Sea Fleet, military investigative department of Pacific Fleet, military investigative department of Strategic Missile Forces and Moscow city military investigative department) which in turn have own subordinated military investigative divisions (garrison military investigative divisions).

== Officers ==
Investigators of the Investigative Committee in a broad sense are directly investigators, senior investigators, heads of investigative divisions and their deputies, heads of investigative departments and their deputies, chairman and vice-chairmen of the Investigative Committee. All of them are federal government officials, have special ranks (Russian: специальные звания) and wear special uniform with shoulder insignia. Military investigators (in a broad sense) are military personnel, have military ranks of commissioned officers and wear military uniform with shoulder insignia but they are not subordinated to any military authority (excepting higher military investigator).

== See also ==
- Investigative Committee of Belarus
