= Konstantin Chuychenko =

Russian politician (born 1965)

- Константин Чуйченко
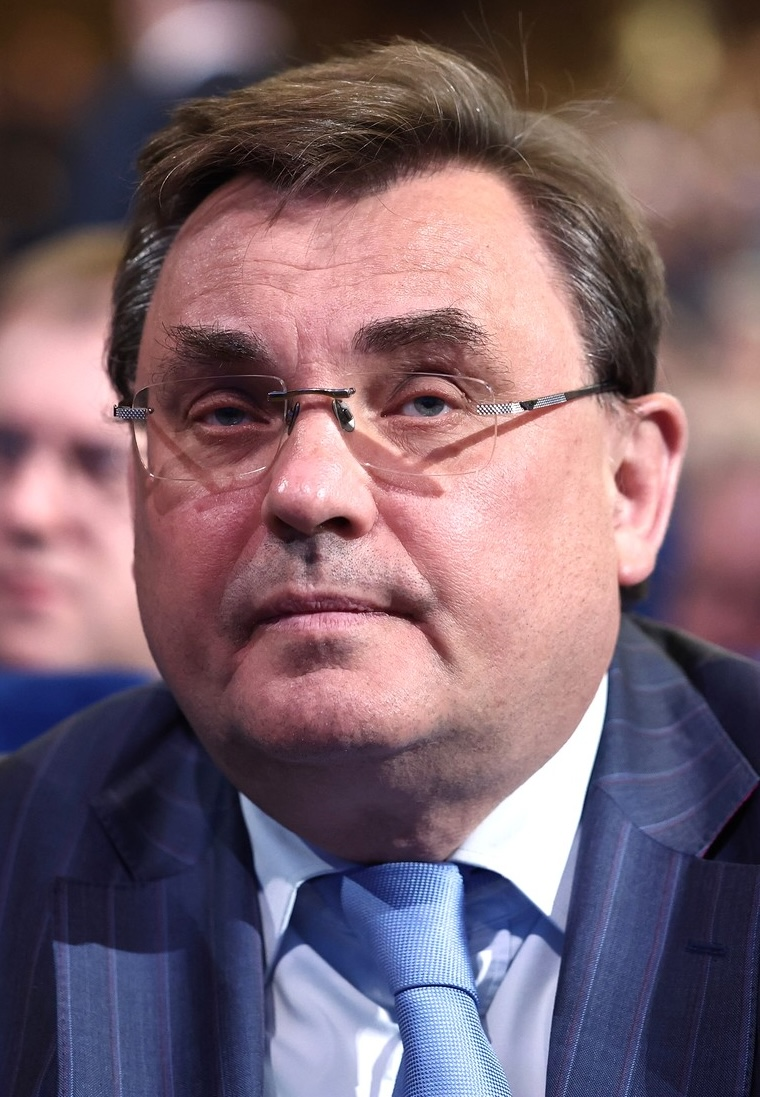
- Chuychenko in 2024

Minister of Justice
- Incumbent
- Assumed office 21 January 2020
- President: Vladimir Putin
- Prime Minister: Mikhail Mishustin
- Preceded by: Aleksandr Konovalov

Deputy Prime Minister of Russia – Chief of Staff of the Government
- In office 18 May 2018 – 15 January 2020; Acting: 15 January 2020 – 21 January 2020
- President: Vladimir Putin
- Prime Minister: Dmitry Medvedev
- Preceded by: Sergey Prikhodko
- Succeeded by: Dmitry Grigorenko

Head of the Control Department in the Russian Presidential Administration
- In office 13 May 2008 – 18 May 2018
- President: Dmitry Medvedev; Vladimir Putin

Personal details
- Born: Konstantin Anatolyevich Chuychenko; 12 July 1965 (age 61) Lipetsk, Russian SFSR, Soviet Union (now Russia)
- Party: Independent

Konstantin Anatolyevich Chuychenko (Russian: Константин Анатольевич Чуйченко; born 12 July 1965) is a Russian politician, businessman, and lawyer who has served as the Minister of Justice since 21 January 2020. Previously, he was Deputy Prime Minister of Russia and Chief of Staff of the Government from 2018 to 2020.

He has the federal state civilian service ranks of 1st class Active State Councillor of the Russian Federation and Active State Councillor of Justitia of the Russian Federation.

== Biography ==
Born in Lipetsk, Russian SFSR, Soviet Union, Chuychenko graduated from the Law Faculty of Leningrad State University in 1987 as a fellow student of Dmitry Medvedev.

From 1989 to 1992, Chuychenko served in the KGB. In March 2001, he became the Chief of the Legal Department of Gazprom and since April 2002 he has been a member of the management committee of Gazprom. From 17 January 2003 to July 2004, he was the Chairman of the Board of Directors of the Gazprom Media holding. Since March 2003, he has been a member of the board of directors of the TNT TV network. He is also a member of the board of directors of Gazprom Media, NTV and a shareholder of Gazprom. Since July 2004, he has been an executive director of RosUkrEnergo representing Gazprombank. Since 23 December 2005, he has been a member of the board of directors of Sibneft (now Gazprom Neft).

On 15 January 2020, he resigned as part of the cabinet, after President Vladimir Putin delivered the Presidential Address to the Federal Assembly. On 21 January, he was appointed Minister of Justice in the First Cabinet of Mikhail Mishustin. On 14 May 2024 he was again appointed Minister of Justice in the Second Cabinet of Mikhail Mishustin.

== Awards ==
- Order of Honour (2006)
- Order "For Merit to the Fatherland" IV degree (2011)
- Order of Alexander Nevsky (2014)

== Personal life ==
He is married to Christina Tikhonova, who is a lawyer and has three daughters.

=== Sanctions ===
In 2022, the United States and United Kingdom imposed sanctions on Chuychenko. In December 2022, the European Union sanctioned him in relation to the Russian invasion of Ukraine, followed by Japan in February 2023.

Political offices
Preceded by Aleksandr Konovalov	Minister of Justice; 2020–present	Incumbent
