= Saint Tikhon's Orthodox University =

Saint Tikhon's Orthodox University of Humanities
- Православный Свято-Тихоновский гуманитарный университет
- Former names: Theology and Cathechisis Courses (1991–1992); Saint Tikhon's Orthodox Institute of Humanities (1992–2004)
- Type: Theological university for the laity
- Established: 1991
- Affiliations: Russian Orthodox Church
- President: Archpriest Vladimir Vorobyov
- Rector: bishop Methodius Zinkovsky
- Location: Moscow, Russia; 55.77204°N 37.6129°E
- Campus: Urban (under construction)
- Website: http://pstgu.ru/
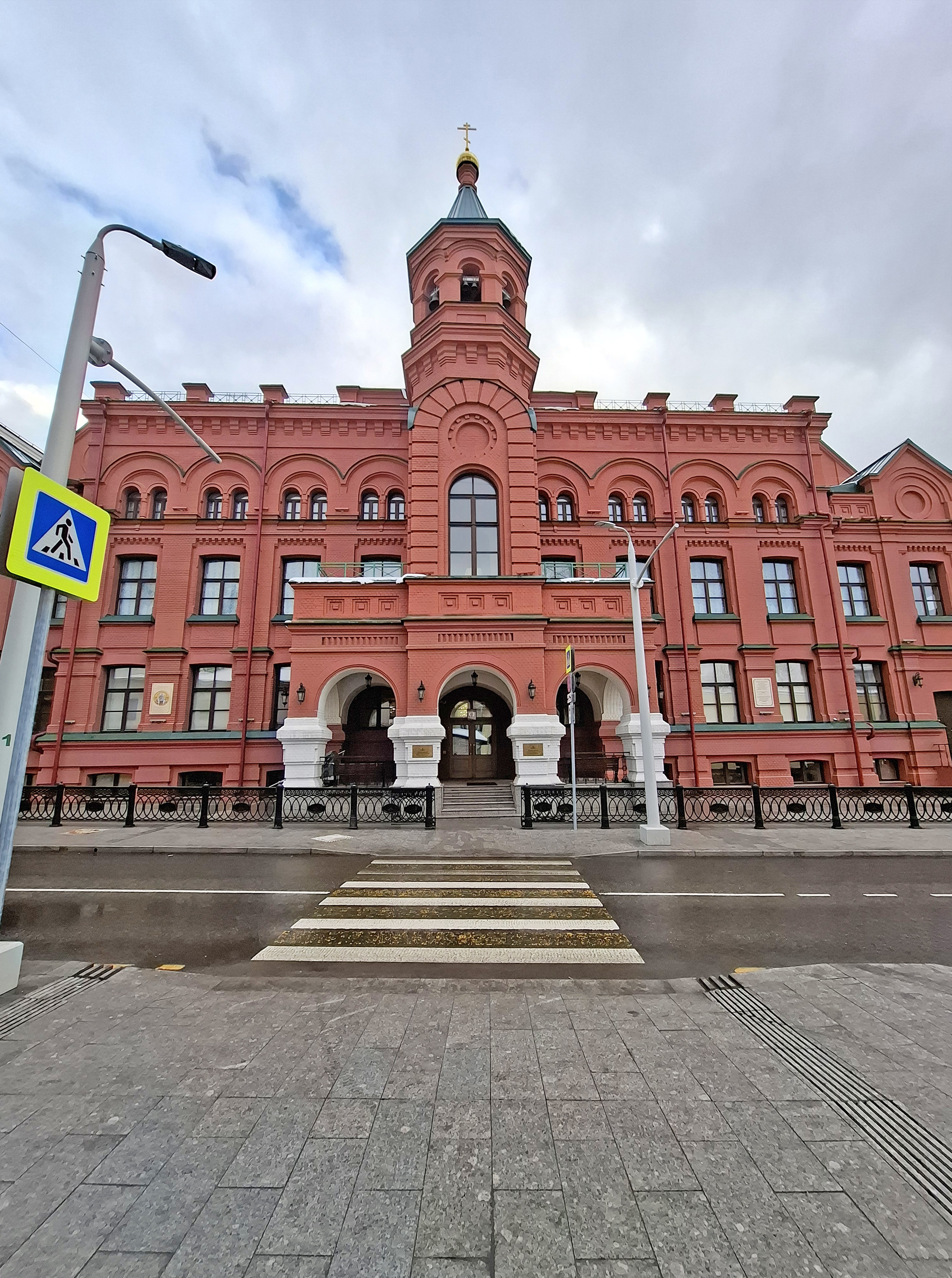

Saint Tikhon's Orthodox University of Humanities (Russian: Православный Свято-Тихоновский гуманитарный университет) in Moscow, Russia is a coeducational theological university for the laity affiliated with the Russian Orthodox Church. The university, established in 1991, is Russia's first theological graduate-level school for the lay men and women, unlike traditional Orthodox seminaries preparing male students for ordination. It is the only Orthodox institution in Russia that is accredited to issue generally accepted diplomas. Ten departments of the university provide education in theology, history, teaching, missionary practice, religious arts and music, economics, social services and information management. Basic theology studies are mandatory for students of all departments. Admission does not require adherence to Orthodox faith or any religious tests, except for the icon school where applicants should demonstrate skills in traditional Orthodox art.

The university traces its roots to Orthodox missionaries Vsevolod Shpiller (1902–1984) and hieromonk Paul (Troitsky). In the end of the 1980s their alumni set up evening courses of theology that merged in a unified institution in 1991 and, with support of Patriarch Alexy II of Moscow, acquired state accreditation as a university in 1992. The university is closely associated with the Brotherhood of Merciful Saviour, which traditionally provided teaching staff and premises to the university.

For years, the university operated on premises leased from other colleges or on the parish church properties, notably the church of Saint Nicholas in Kyzneci (Zamoskvorechye District) operated by the Brotherhood. In the 2000s the university obtained the rights to the former Bishopric House that prior to the October Revolution housed the Orthodox Open University and is now (2009) in the process of rebuilding the run-down building into its new, permanent, campus.

The university has been continuously chaired by one of its founders, and the founding member of the Brotherhood of Merciful Saviour, Revd. Vladimir Vorobyov (born 1941) since 1991. Rector of the university is, as of 2009, an ex officio member of the Local Council (pomestny sobor) of the Russian Orthodox Church. Vladimir Vorobyov also chairs the department of religion and culture at the Ministry of Internal Affairs Academy.

The university selects its staff primarily from ordained Russian Orthodox clerics and lay academicians; guest speakers may come from other denominations (most often Roman Catholic Church). University staff was actively engaged in the 2007 public controversy on the alleged Orthodox clericalisation of school education, opposing the nonsectarian approach of the Russian Academy of Sciences. In 2006 the late Patriarch Alexey, speaking in favor of increased Orthodox presence in public schools, proposed Saint Tikhon's university as the source of qualified lay teachers of the Basics of Orthodox Culture course recommended by the Church. In 2018 topped the list of the most demanded humanitarian universities in Russia.

The university celebrates its holiday on November 18, the day of Saint Tikhon's ascension to the Patriarchy in 1917.

== Notable alumni ==
See also Category:Saint Tikhon's Orthodox University people

- Aleksandr Konovalov, judge of the Constitutional Court of Russia
- Metropolitan Nicholas of Akhalkalaki (Georgian Orthodox Church)
