= Prosecutors' ranks in the Russian Federation =

The prosecutor's ranks in the Russian Federation are defined by the Presidential Decree of 21 November 2012 No.1563.

Shoulder boards are used as insignia.

== Ranks and insignia ==
Category	Ranks	Insignia
Highest officials	Active State Councillor of Justitia	
Highest officials	1st class State Councillor of Justitia	
Highest officials	2nd class State Councillor of Justitia	
Highest officials	3rd class State Councillor of Justitia	
Senior officials	Senior Councillor of Justitia	
Senior officials	Councillor of Justitia	
Senior officials	Junior Councillor of Justitia	
Junior officials	1st class Jurist	
Junior officials	2nd class Jurist	
Junior officials	3rd class Jurist	
Junior officials	Junior Jurist	

== See also ==
- Special ranks in Investigative Committee of Russia
- State civilian and municipal service ranks in Russian Federation
- Diplomatic ranks in Russian Federation
- Army ranks and insignia of the Russian Federation
- Naval ranks and insignia of the Russian Federation
