= Special ranks of the Investigative Committee of Russia =

The special ranks in the Investigative Committee of Russia are defined by the article 20 of the Federal Law of 28 December 2010 No.403-FZ.

Shoulder boards are used as insignia.

== Ranks and insignia ==
Category	Ranks	Insignia
Highest officials	General of Justice	
Highest officials	Colonel General of Justice	
Highest officials	Lieutenant General of Justice	
Highest officials	Major General of Justice	
Senior officials	Colonel of Justice	
Senior officials	Lieutenant Colonel of Justice	
Senior officials	Major of Justice	
Junior officials	Captain of Justice	
Junior officials	Senior Lieutenant of Justice	
Junior officials	Lieutenant of Justice	
Junior officials	Junior Lieutenant of Justice	

== See also ==
- Prosecutor's ranks in Russian Federation
- State civilian and municipal service ranks in Russian Federation
- Diplomatic ranks in Russian Federation
- Army ranks and insignia of the Russian Federation
- Naval ranks and insignia of the Russian Federation
