= Evgeny Shkolov =

Russian politician and businessman (born 1955)

- Евгений Школов
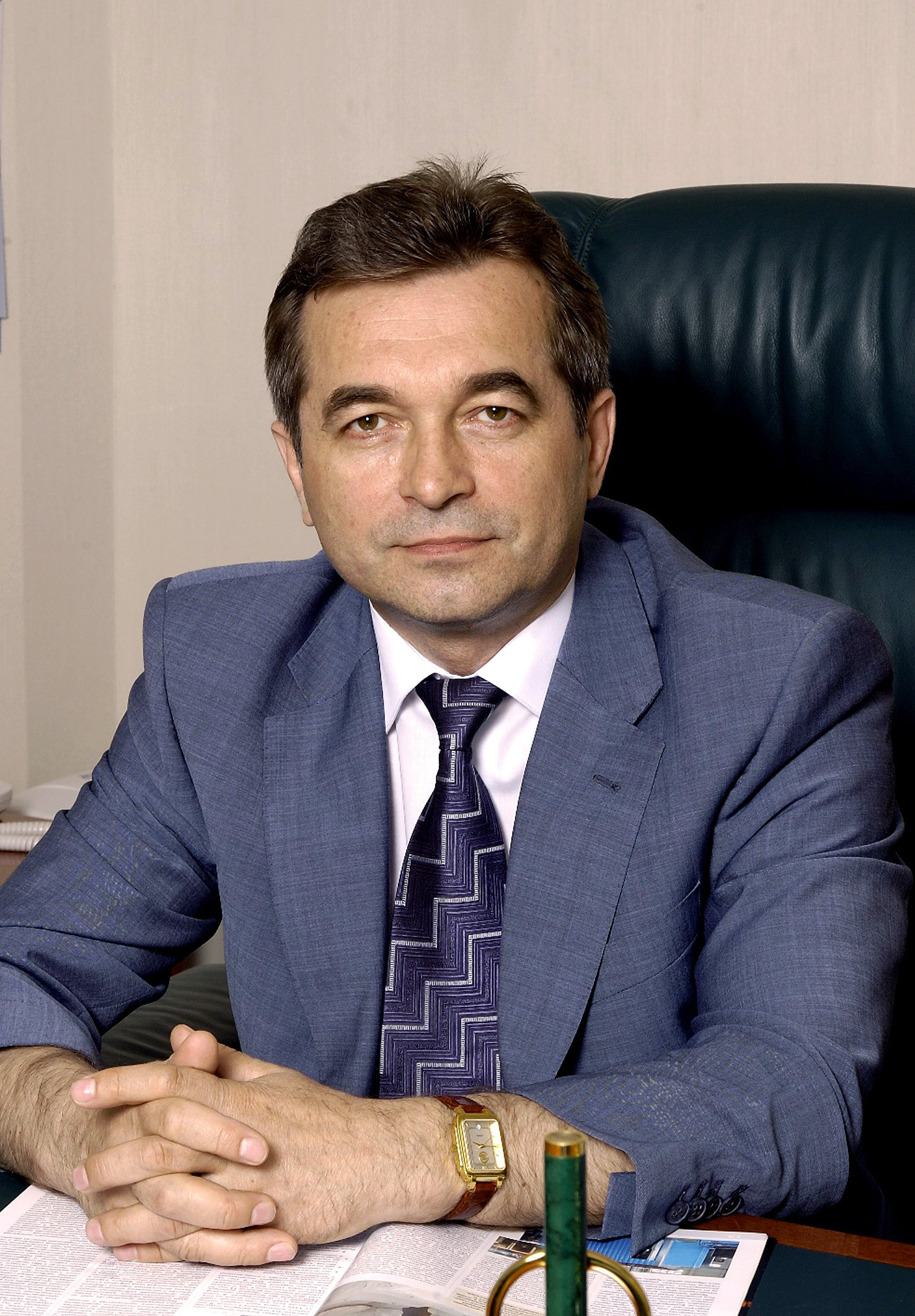

Aide to the President of Russia
- In office 23 May 2012 – 13 June 2018
- Preceded by: Oleg Markov
- Succeeded by: Anatoly Seryshev

Deputy Minister of Internal Affairs
- In office 19 November 2007 – 11 June 2011

Personal details
- Born: Evgeny Mikhailovich Shkolov; 31 August 1955 (age 71) Dresden, East Germany
- Citizenship: Russia; Soviet Union (previously)
- Children: 2
- Education: Ivanovo State Energy University

Military service
- Allegiance: Soviet Union
- Branch/service: Soviet Army
- Years of service: 1981-1983

Evgeny Mikhailovich Shkolov (Russian: Евгений Михайлович Школов; born 31 August 1955) is a Russian politician and former Aide to the President of Russia. He has the federal state civilian service rank of 1st class Active State Councillor of the Russian Federation.

== Early life and education ==
Evgeny Shkolov was born on August 31, 1955, in Dresden, East Germany. His father was a Soviet intelligence officer.

He graduated from the Ivanovo State Power Engineering University in 1977.

== Career ==
After graduating from the Ivanovo State Energy University, Shkolov continued working in engineering and managerial positions at industrial enterprises in the Ivanovo oblast until 1992. Shkolov served in the Soviet Army from 1981 to 1983. From 1992 to 1998, he worked as a specialist and Head of the Department of Foreign Economic Relations of the Administration of the city of Ivanovo and, allegedly, had numerous business trips to Germany, Italy and Croatia during this posting. Later, he worked as the Director and Coordinator of the Union of Industrialists and Entrepreneurs of the Ivanovo oblast. From 2000 to 2002, he served as the Chief Federal Inspector for the Ivanovo oblast of the Office of Plenipotentiary Representative of the President of the Russian Federation in the Central Federal District.

From September 2002 to March 2005, he served as the Assistant to the Head of the Presidential Administration, Alexander Voloshin. In March 2005, he became the Vice President of the Joint Stock Company Transneft and in April 2005, became a member of the board for transport of oil.

On November 15, 2006, Shkolov was appointed to the post of Head of the Department of Economic Security of the Russian Federation. On November 19, 2007, he was appointed as the Deputy Minister of Internal Affairs of Russian Federation. On January 25, 2008, he was awarded the class rank of Acting State Advisor to the Russian Federation, which is the civilian equivalent of Army General. He was relieved from his post of Deputy Minister of Internals Affairs on June 11, 2011, by then President Dmitry Medvedev.

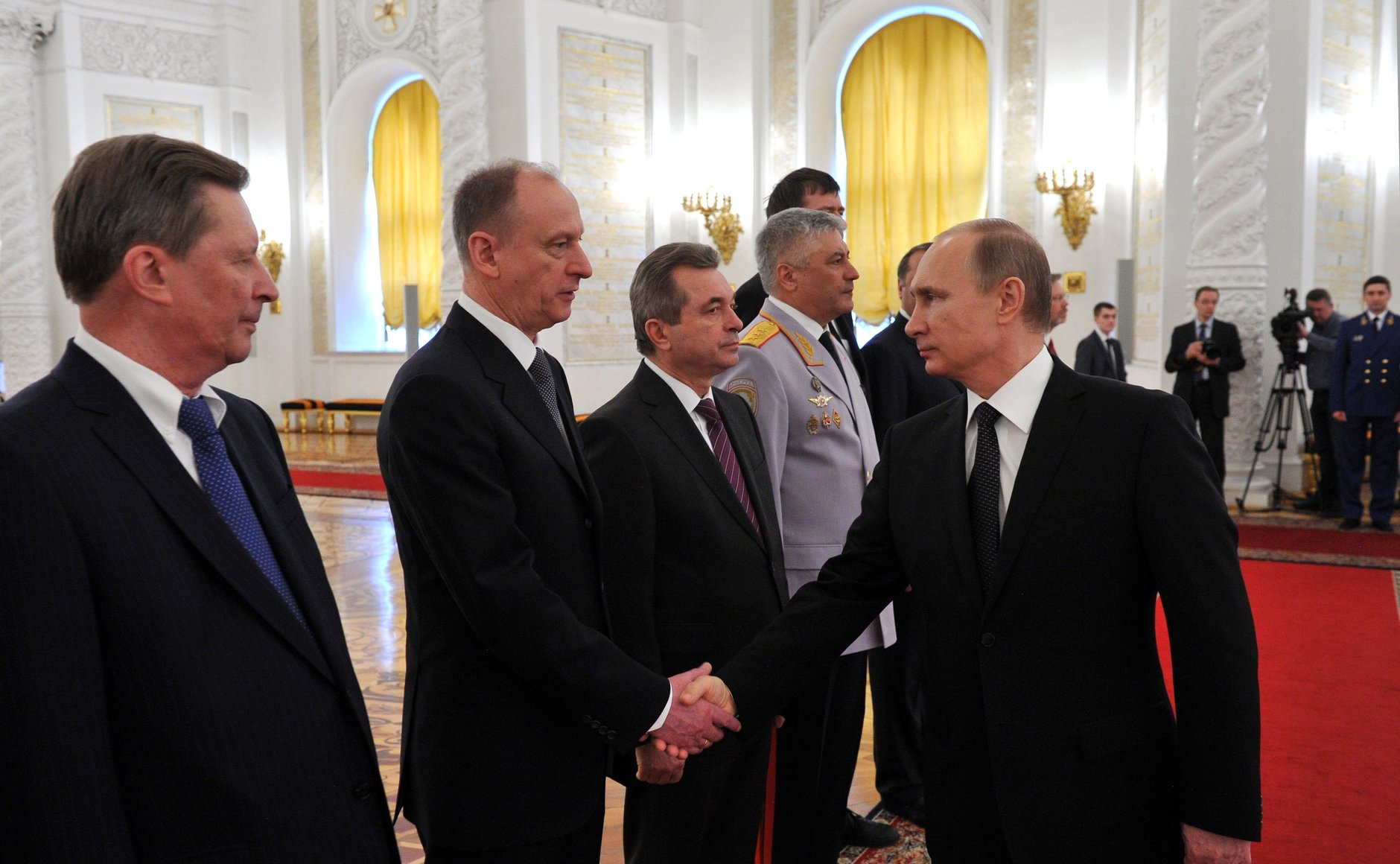
Yevgeny Shkolov (3rd from left) at a meeting of Vladimir Putin with officers and prosecutors appointed to senior positions, April 2015

From 2011 to 2012, he served as chairman of the Board of Directors of the Russian machine building company, Uralvagonzavod. On May 23, 2012, he was appointed Aide to the President of the Russia, where he oversaw the activities of the Presidential Administration for Civil Service and Personnel. On June 7, 2013, he was appointed by the decree of the President of Russia, the Commissioner for Anti-Corruption Inspections. According to the decree, he was "authorized to make decisions on the implementation of the inspections provided for by the regulatory legal acts of the Russian Federation on combating corruption".

On June 13, 2018, five weeks after the inauguration of Vladimir Putin, Shkolov resigned from his post of Aide to the President of Russia during the reshuffle in the Presidential Administration of Russia. Former FSB employee, Anatoly Seryshev succeeded him.

=== Sanctions ===
On April 6, 2018, Shkolov was on the United States' "Kremlin List" which put sanctions against many Russian businessmen that were close to Vladimir Putin.

He was sanctioned by the UK government in 2023 in relation to the Russo-Ukrainian War.

== Personal life ==
Shkolov is married and has two children.

== See also ==
- Presidential Administration of Russia
- Transneft
