= Exequatur =

Legal document

An exequatur (Latin, literally "let it execute") is a legal document issued by a sovereign authority that permits the exercise or enforcement of a right within the jurisdiction of the authority.

== International relations ==
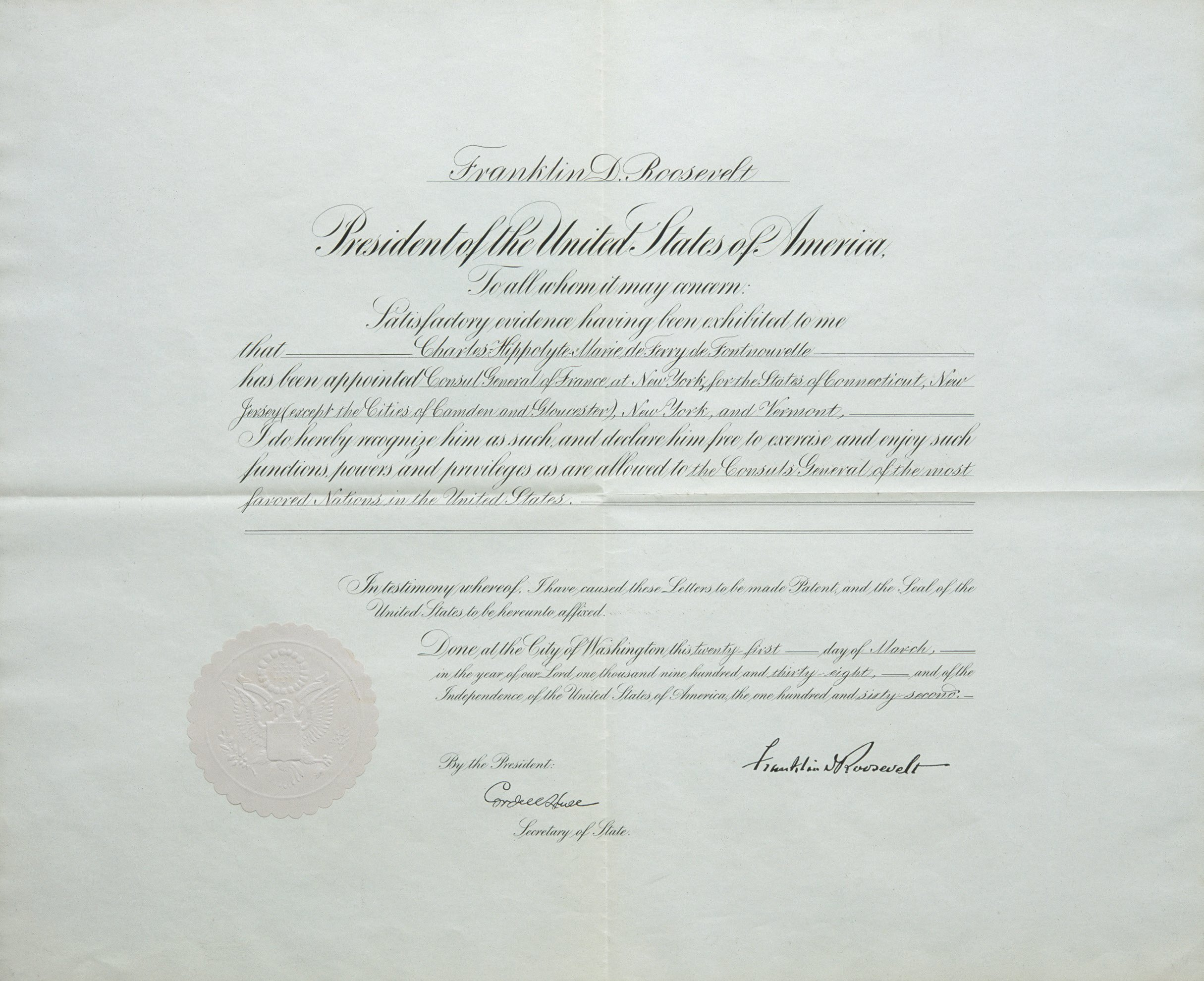
An exequatur signed by US President Franklin D. Roosevelt for French Consul Charles de Ferry de Fontnouvelle in 1938

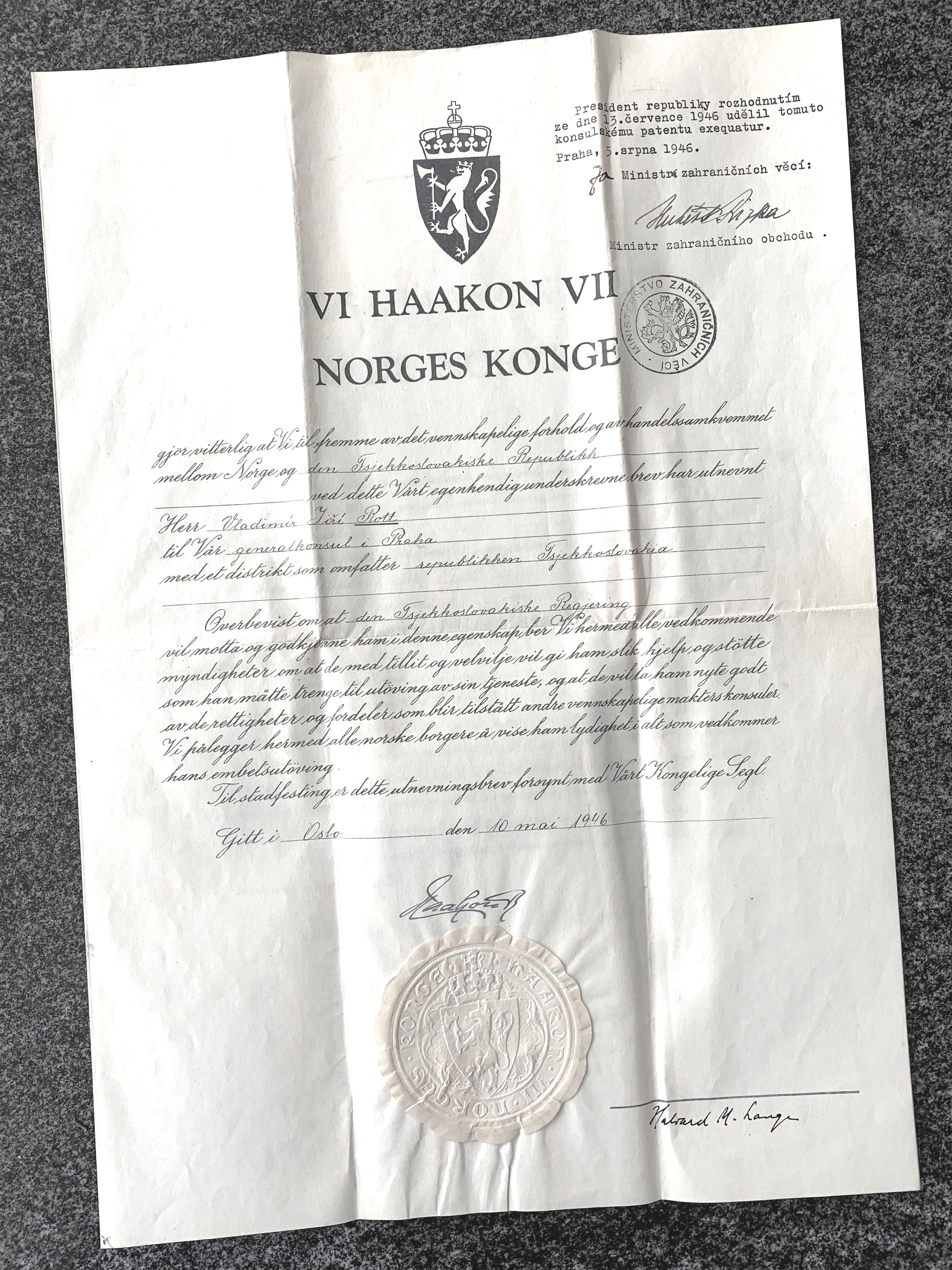
A 1946 consular commission, signed by Haakon VII on 10 May, appointing Czech businessman Vladimír Jiří Rott as consul general of Norway to the Third Czechoslovak Republic. Added to the top right corner is a note, signed by foreign minister Jan Masaryk on 5 August, that president Edvard Beneš had signed the requisite exequatur on 13 July.

In international diplomacy, an exequatur is a patent issued by a head of state recognizing someone as a consul of a foreign sovereign state. The exequatur recognizes the consul as a member of the receiving state's diplomatic corps, and guarantees the rights and privileges of consular office. The consul must first have a consular commission from the state which they represent, which appoints them a member of its diplomatic service. If a consul is not appointed by commission, they receive no exequatur; the receiving state's government will usually provide some other means to recognize them. An exequatur may be withdrawn, which necessitates the consul's recall.

Former U.S. diplomat Jonathan B. Rickert noted that he received an exequatur from Elizabeth II when accredited to the United Kingdom in 1965, although not until several months after his arrival; he received no exequatur when accredited to the Socialist Republic of Romania in the 1970s.

== Catholic Canon Law ==
An exequatur is a legal instrument issued by secular authorities in Roman Catholic nations to guarantee the legal force of papal decrees within the jurisdiction of the secular authority. This custom began during the Western Schism, when the legitimately elected Supreme Pontiff permitted secular leaders to verify the authenticity of papal decrees before enforcing them.

Some dissidents in the church claim that the custom arose as an implication of the nature of secular authority over the church, and that such a state privilege to verify papal doctrine had been exercised since the early days of the church. However, church doctrine denies that any permission from secular authority is necessary for papal decrees to be legally effective, even though secular authorities sometimes do not enforce them.

== Other uses ==
In Brazilian, Romanian, French, Luxembourgish, Italian (via the Court of Appeal), Mexican, and Spanish laws, an exequatur is a judgment of a tribunal that a decision issued by a foreign tribunal is to be executed in the jurisdiction of the former, thereby granting authority to the decision of the foreign tribunal as if it issued from the native tribunal.

In Puerto Rico, an exequatur is a document that validates a court order of a United States civil court as if a court of the Commonwealth of Puerto Rico issued it.
