= Boris Kuzyk =

Russian economist (born 1958)

- Борис Кузык
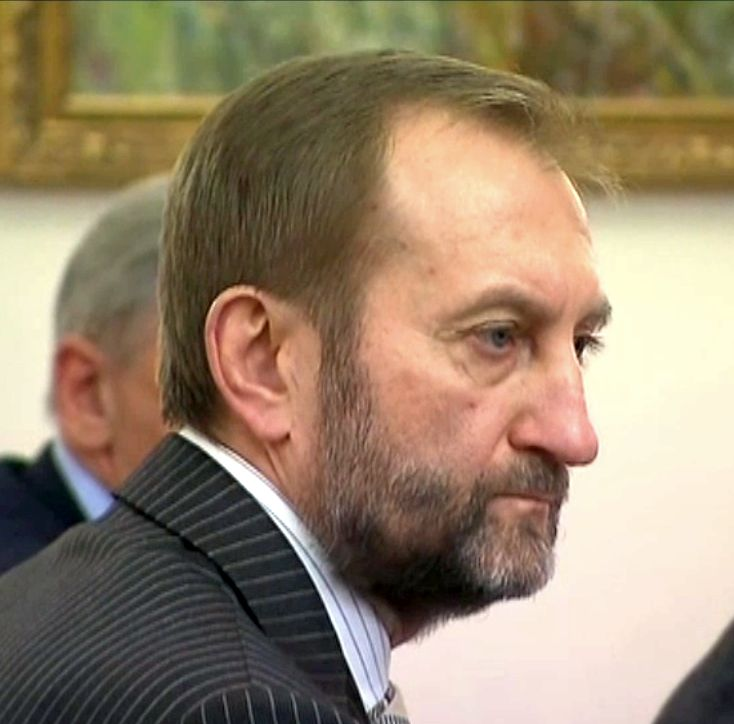
- Kuzyk in 2014

Aide to President of Russia for military-technical cooperation
- In office 1994–1998

Personal details
- Born: Boris Nikolayevich Kuzyk; 19 October 1958 (age 67) Oleksandrivka Raion, Kirovohrad Oblast, Ukrainian SSR, Soviet Union
- Occupation: Economist
- Known for: Full member of Russian Academy of Sciences

Military service
- Allegiance: Soviet Union; Russia
- Branch/service: Soviet Armed Forces; Armed Forces of the Russian Federation
- Years of service: 1979–1993
- Rank: Major general

Boris Nikolayevich Kuzyk (Russian: Борис Николаевич Кузык; born 19 October 1958, Oleksandrivka Raion, Kirovohrad Oblast, Soviet Union) is a Russian economist, professor, member of Russian Academy of Sciences, Honored Scientist of the Russian Federation, director of the Institute for Economic Strategies, Major general, 1st class Active State Councillor of the Russian Federation.

== Early life and education ==
Kuzyk was born on 19 October 1958 in Oleksandrivka Raion, Kirovohrad Oblast.

In 1979, he graduated with honors from the Yaroslavl Higher Military Financial School. In 1987, also with honors, he graduated from Military Faculty of the Moscow Financial Institute.

He has a PhD in economics.

After graduation he served in the military units of the Far Eastern Military District.

== Early career ==
From 1987 to 1993, he worked at the USSR and Russia's Ministry of Foreign Economic Relations. From 1994 to 1998 he served as aide to President of Russia for military-technical cooperation between Russia and foreign countries.

== Scientific career ==
The scientific interests of Boris Kuzyk are related to Innovation economics issues. He studied the features of the formation of innovation system of modern Russia, developed a set of proposals for the development and restructuring of the high-tech industry, ensuring Russia's economic security, supporting science-intensive industries, and a long-term strategy for Russia's socio-economic development. He proposed a comprehensive system of measures in the field of economic support of the national program "Hydrogen energy in Russia".

Boris Kuzyk is the author of more than 200 scientific papers (including 26 monographs).

Since May 22, 2003 he has been corresponding member, and since December 22, 2011 – full member of the Russian Academy of Sciences (Department of Social Sciences: economics of socio-economic transformations).

== Recognition ==
- State Prize of the Russian Federation
- Honored Scientist of the Russian Federation (2000)
- Gold N. D. Kondratieff Medal (2004)

== Selected scientific works ==
- Russia – 2050: innovation breakthrough strategy. M.: Economica publishing house, 2004.
- Economics of the military sphere. M.: Znanie publishing house, 2006, 224 p.
- Civilizations: theory, history, dialogue, future. M.: Institute of Economic Strategies, 2006, in 2 volumes.
- China – Russia 2050: co-development strategy. M.: Institute of Economic Strategies, 2006.
- India – Russia: Partnership Strategy in the 21st century. M.: Institute of Economic Strategies, 2009. 1224 p. ISBN 978-5-9361-8158-0.
