= Diplomatic ranks of the Russian Federation =

The diplomatic ranks in the Russian Federation were introduced with enactment of the Federal Law of 27 July 2010 No.205-FZ. Diplomatic ranks are not to be confused with diplomatic positions.

Uniform and insignia (patches, stitched over the place for a buttonholes) for Russian diplomats were established by the Government of Russia Decree of 17 November 2001 No.799.

== Ranks and insignia ==
Category	Ranks	Insignia
Highest officials	Ambassador Extraordinary and Plenipotentiary	
Highest officials	1st class Extraordinary and Plenipotentiary Envoy	
Highest officials	2nd class Extraordinary and Plenipotentiary Envoy	
Main officials	1st class Councillor	
Main officials	2nd class Councillor	
Leading officials	1st class First secretary	
Leading officials	2nd class First secretary	
Senior officials	1st class Second secretary	
Senior officials	2nd class Second secretary	
Junior officials	Third secretary	
Junior officials	Attache	

== See also ==
- State civilian and municipal service ranks in Russian Federation
- Prosecutor's ranks in Russian Federation
- Special ranks in Investigative Committee of Russia
- Army ranks and insignia of the Russian Federation
- Naval ranks and insignia of the Russian Federation
