= Consular commission =

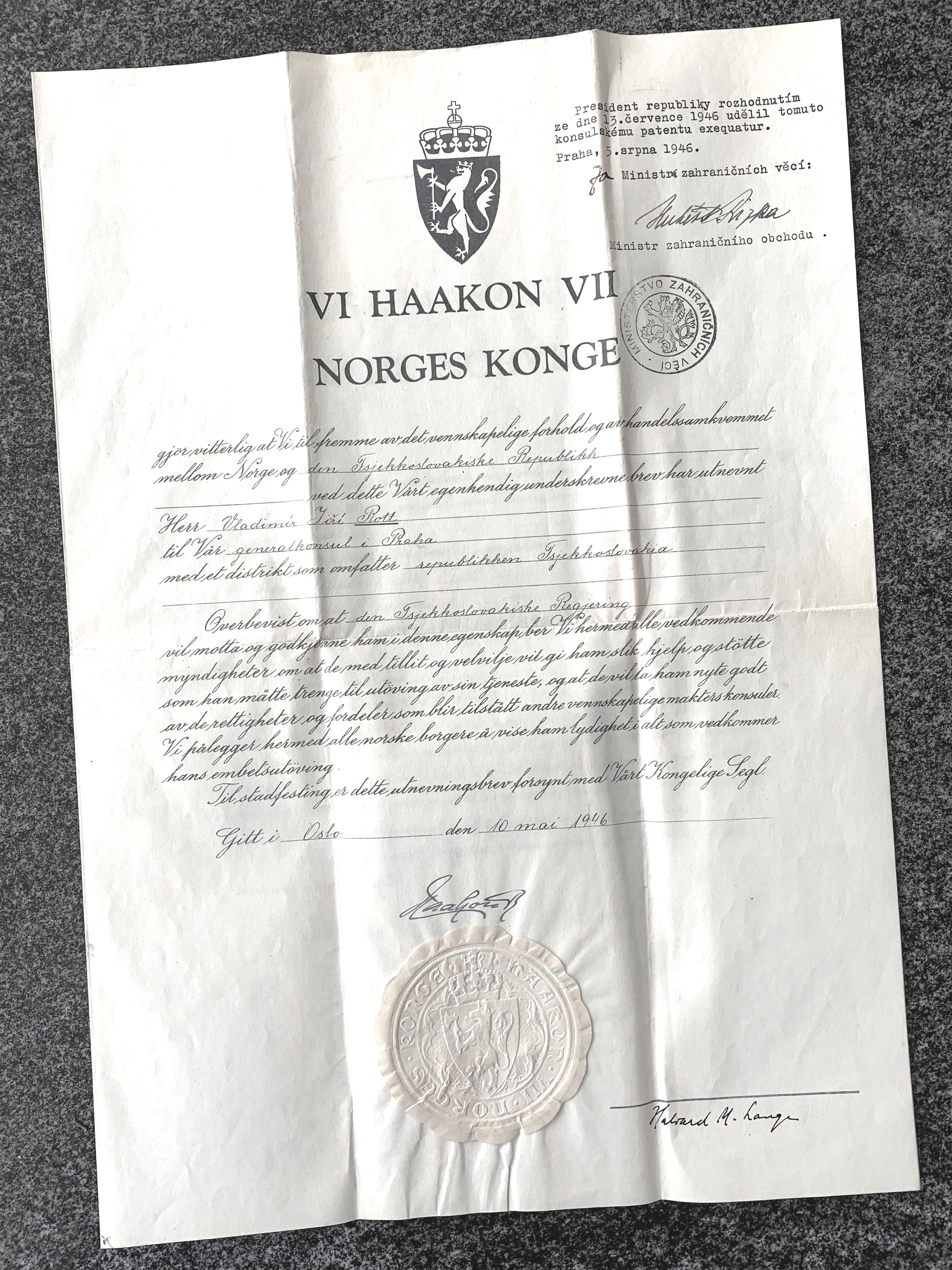
A 1946 consular commission, signed by Haakon VII on 10 May, appointing Czech businessman Vladimír Jiří Rott as consul general of Norway to the Third Czechoslovak Republic. Added to the top right corner is a note, signed by foreign minister Jan Masaryk on 5 August, that president Edvard Beneš had signed the requisite exequatur on 13 July.

A Consular Commission (in French: lettre de provision; in Spanish: carta patente) is a document that a government issues to nominate a consul in a different country. The consular commission is usually issued by the Ministry of Foreign Affairs (or comparable department) of the state nominating the consul. Based on the nomination, the receiving state may or may not issue an exequatur - accepting the consul.

According to the Vienna Convention on Consular Relations:

1.The head of a consular post shall be provided by the sending State with a document, in the form of a commission or similar instrument, made out for each appointment, certifying his capacity and showing, as a general rule, his full name, his category and class, the consular district and the seat of the consular post.

2.The sending State shall transmit the commission or similar instrument through the diplomatic or other appropriate channel to the Government of the State in whose territory the head of a consular post is to exercise his functions.

3.If the receiving State agrees, the sending State may, instead of a commission or similar instrument, send to the receiving State a notification containing the particulars required by paragraph of this article.
