= Ministry of Justice (Russia) =

Government minister of Russia

Ministry of Justice of the Russian Federation
- Министерство юстиции Российской Федерации; Ministerstvo yustitsii Rossiiskoi Federatsii
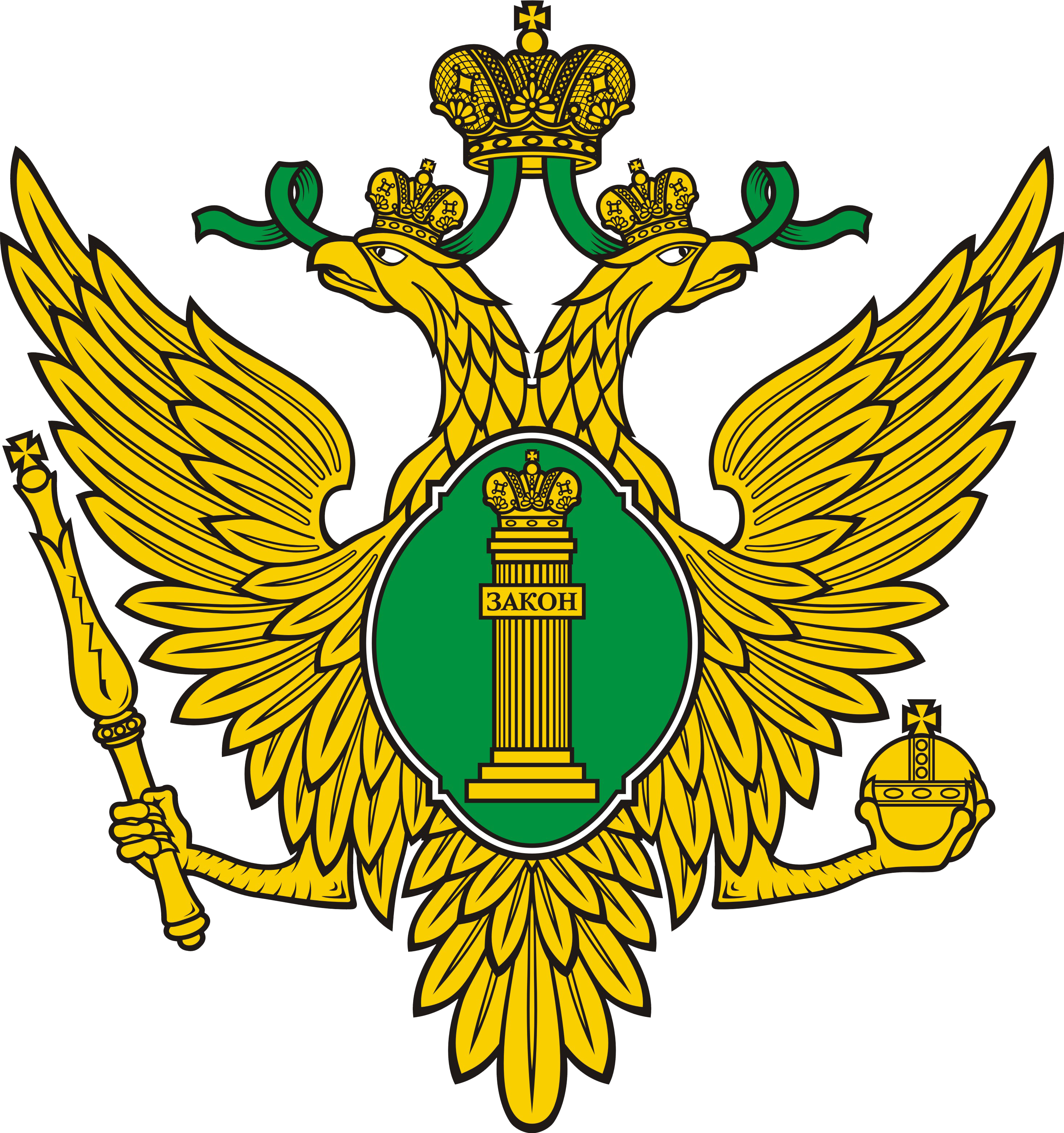
- Seal

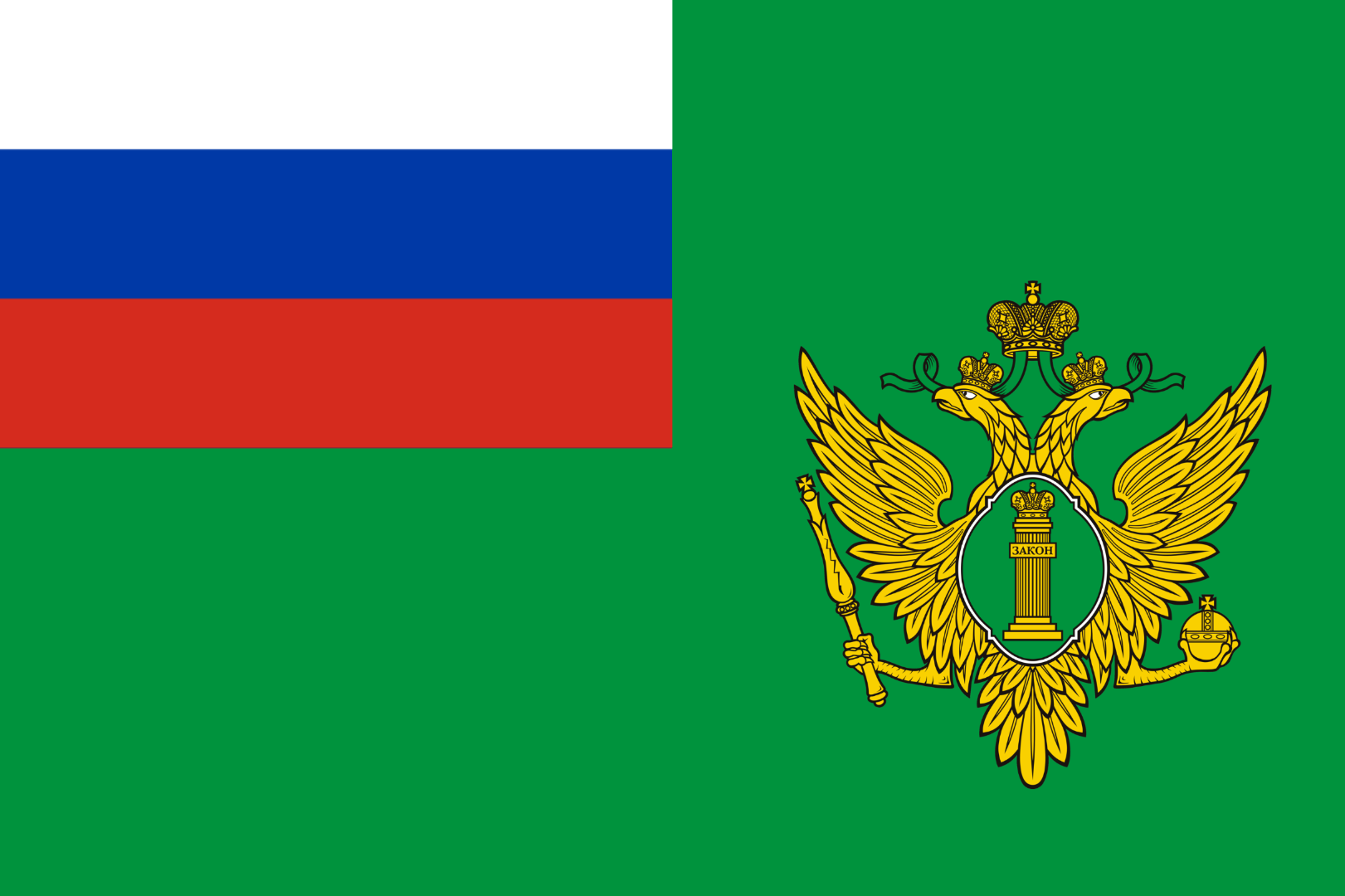
- Flag

Agency overview
- Formed: 1991
- Preceding agencies: Ministry of Justice of the RSFSR (1946-1963, 1970-1991); People's Commissariat for Justice of the RSFSR (1917—1946); Ministry of Justice of the Russian Empire (1802—1917); Collegium of Justice (1717—1802)
- Jurisdiction: President of Russia
- Headquarters: Zhitnaya Street 14; Yakimanka District, Central Administrative Okrug, Moscow; 55°43′53″N 37°36′42″E
- Minister responsible: Konstantin Chuychenko, Minister of Justice
- Child agencies: Federal Penitentiary Service; Federal Bailiffs Service
- Website: minjust.gov.ru

The Ministry of Justice of the Russian Federation (Russian: Министе́рство юсти́ции Росси́йской Федера́ции, Миню́ст Росси́и, romanized: Ministerstvo yustitsii Rossiyskoy Federatsii, Minyust Rossii) is a ministry of the Government of Russia responsible for the legal system and penal system.

The Ministry of Justice is the federal authority for operating Russia's courts and correctional services with enforcement by two subordinate executive federal agencies: the Federal Bailiffs Service (FSSP) and the Federal Penitentiary Service (FSIN). The Ministry of Justice is headquartered at Zhitnaya Street 14 in Yakimanka District, Central Administrative Okrug, Moscow.

The Ministry of Justice was founded in 1991 by renaming of the Ministry of Justice of the Russian SFSR following the dissolution of the Soviet Union, but claims succession from the Ministry of Justice of the Russian Empire founded in 1802.

Konstantin Chuychenko has been the Minister of Justice since 21 January 2020.

== Functions ==
According to the Decree of the President of the Russian Federation from 13 October 2004 (as amended on 15 December 2016) and in accordance with other regulations, the Ministry of Justice is engaged in the elaboration and implementation of public policies and regulatory control, as well as performs law enforcement duties and functions of control and supervision in the areas of:

- Execution of criminal penalties (by Federal Penitentiary Service)
- Registered non-profit organizations, including the offices of international organizations and foreign non-governmental organizations, public associations, political parties and religious organizations, as well as providing information about them
- Advocacy and notarial activity
- State registration of civil status
- Legalization and Apostille
- Ensure the established order of the courts and the execution of judicial acts and other organs
- Combating corruption (by help of the Prosecutor General of Russia)
- Anti-corruption expertise of draft laws spend accredited as an independent expert individuals and legal entities. As of 16 November 2010, as an independent expert accredited 828 individuals and 164 legal entities. The decision on accreditation taking the Minister of Justice of the Russian Federation or one of its authorized deputy ministers, as issued an executive order.

== History ==
The Ministry of Justice of the Russian Empire was founded on 8 September 1802 by Manifesto of Alexander I "On the establishment of ministries." The same document as part of the government provided for the post of Minister of Justice, and he also served as Attorney General of the Russian Empire.

The Ministry of Justice has been designated as the preparation of legislative acts, as well as the management of courts and prosecutors. It dealt with the appointment, transfer, dismissal of officials of judicial departments, agencies and the abolition of the courts, supervised their work.

The first Minister of Justice was the General Prosecutor of the Russian Empire, Gavriil Romanovich Derzhavin.

In 1864 in Russia, the judicial reform was held, in the preparation and conduct of which the Ministry of Justice has taken an active part, the powers of the Ministry of Justice significantly expanded. At all stages of judicial reform, the role of the Ministry of Justice, was significant, even decisive. Ministry of Justice carried out the management of the judiciary, and prison management of landmark pieces, notaries. As director of personnel of the court and prosecutors, it was the right appointment and dismissal of the investigators on the most important cases in district courts and municipal judges and members of the county district court. The Ministry has introduced the world's institutions of judges and jurors, directly managed the activities of prosecutors, and manage places of detention. Department have sufficient authority to establish and enforce legal policy of the state.

On the proposal of the Ministry of Justice of the Act of 16 June 1884 was enhanced sentence for embezzlement and theft of service, including those of the privileged classes. At the request of the Ministry of Justice, 26 May 1881 was canceled public executions. In the area of civil rights 19 May 1881 were compiled by the Ministry of Justice rules on how to strengthen the rights of real estate.

All legislative proposals submitted to the conclusion of the Ministry of Justice prior to making them for consideration by the Council of State, on the 1881 bills other departments began to arrive at the conclusion of the Ministry of Justice not only to evaluate them from a legal perspective, but also to harmonize with the existing laws.

Legislation Ministry of Justice of the late 19th century - early 20th century was characterised by a focus on individual rights. In 1897, a draft bill to amend the order of the excitation of questions about the responsibility of governors, in 1903 - the draft law on probation, which was completely new and very democratic institution in Russia, in the same year, the Ministry of Justice was designed by disciplinary regulations governing the punishment of official misconduct, and in 1904, a draft law on some of the changes in the prosecution of criminal liability, and public order offences. In the same year the Ministry of Justice approved the regulations on the procedure of the prison department of civil political prisoners.

Since the mid-19th century, the Ministers of Justice is actively engaged in international activities: chairing the International Tribunal, were members of a permanent International Court of Arbitration in The Hague. The aim was to inform the Ministry of Justice Ministers on approval of the statutes of newly created organisations and societies, and the Minister was obliged to submit to Emperor weekly personal or written reports on the status of assigned cases.

After the October Revolution of 1917, the Ministry of Justice was transformed into the People's Commissariat of Justice. The practical implementation of the Decree No. 1 "On Court" demanded that the judiciary efforts related to the formation of vessels and the selection of personnel for them. Prominently in the work of the Commissariat of Justice took the creation of new legislation. Accepted 30 January 1928 Resolution of the Communist Central Executive Committee and People's Commissar of Justice were directly subordinated to the prosecutor, and as Vice Chairman of the Supreme Court of the Republic.

Subsequently, the powers of the People's Commissariat of Justice has undergone radical changes - in 1936 the prosecutor's office was separated into an independent agency.

In 1991 the Soviet Justice Ministry was dissolved and the Russian Federation's Ministry of Justice was founded.

== Structure ==
The Ministry is headed by the Minister of Justice. The minister has seven deputies.

- Central office
- The Department of Registration of Department regulations
- Department of Organisation and Control
- Department of regulatory analysis and oversight of penal and judicial decisions
- Department of Civil Service and Personnel
- Department of International Law and Cooperation
- The Department of Constitutional law
- Department of Civil and social law
- Department of Administration
- Department for non-profit organisations
- Department of Legal Aid and interaction with the judicial system
- Department of Legislative Activities and monitor enforcement
- Representative of the Russian Federation to the European Court of Human Rights - Deputy Minister
- Department complaints on criminal matters
- Division of complaints in civil matters
- Analysis Division case law, organisation and control execution
- Front office
- Research Center of Legal Information
- Federal Agency for the Legal Protection of intellectual activity of the military, special and dual-use
- Russian Legal Academy
- State Legal Office
- Russian Federal Forensic Center (in Russian) a specialised research institution designed to meet the needs of courts, preliminary investigation and inquiry bodies in forensic examinations in accordance with the procedural law (Code of Criminal Procedure, Code of Civil Procedure of the Russian Federation, APC RF, etc.).
- Territorial authorities of the Ministry of Justice

=== Subordinate federal agencies (executive authorities) ===
- Federal Penitentiary Service (FSIN of Russia)
- Federal Bailiffs Service (FSSP Russia)

=== Former agencies ===
- On 12 May 2008, the Federal Registration Service was moved under the supervision of the Ministry of Economic Development of the Russian Federation, and in December 2008 was renamed as the Federal Service for State Registration, Cadastre, and Cartography, later to be subordinated directly to the Government of Russia.

== See also ==
- Judiciary of Russia
- Justice ministry
- Politics of Russia
