= 1st class Active State Councillor of the Russian Federation =

Highest rank of the Russian federal civil service

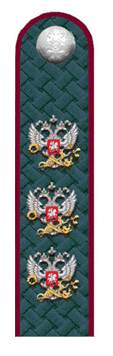
Shoulder's rank

1st class Active State Councillor of the Russian Federation (Russian: действительный государственный советник Российской Федерации 1 класса) is the highest federal state civilian service rank of Russia.

The rank of 1st class Active State Councillor of the Russian Federation was first introduced with enactment of Federal Law of 31 July 1995 No.119-FZ "About fundamentals of state service of Russian Federation" (as qualification class) and was retained with enactment of Federal Law of 27 July 2004 No.79-FZ "About state civilian service of Russian Federation" (as state civilian service rank).

The rank is assigned by the President of Russia. This rank is one step above the rank of 2nd class Active State Councillor of the Russian Federation.

According to the Table approved by the Presidential Decree of 1 February 2005 No.113, the rank of 1st class Active State Councillor of the Russian Federation is equal to the military rank of Army general/Fleet admiral.

== Lists of persons ==
Below are links to lists of persons who were promoted to the rank of 1st class Active State Councillor of the Russian Federation during five-year periods.

Period	Number of persons
1995–1999	174
2000–2004	143
2005–2009	96
2010–2014	145
2015–2019	88
2020–2024	78 (as of 4 January 2023)

== See also ==
- State civilian and municipal service ranks of the Russian Federation
