= State civilian and municipal service ranks of the Russian Federation =

Russian civil ranks

Several acts of the Russian parliament make provisions for the operation of the state civilian and municipal services. Three laws which came into effect between 2004 and 2007 lay out the principal structures and functions of the services.

Federal state civilian service ranks in Russia are set out in the Federal Law of 27 July 2004 No.79-FZ "Concerning the state civilian service of the Russian Federation".

State civilian service ranks of the federal subjects of the Russian Federation are laid out in the Federal Law of the 27th of July 2004 No.79-FZ "Concerning the state civilian service of the Russian Federation".

The ranks of the municipal service are set out in the Federal Law of the 2nd of March 2007 No.25-FZ "Concerning the municipal service of the Russian Federation".

These laws are supplemented by acts pertaining more generally to the status of Russian federal subjects.

Those in the ranks of the civilian and municipal services wear the insignia of the appropriate organisation on a patch stitched onto their clothing.

== Federal ranks and insignia ==
Category	General ranks	Insignia	Ranks for officials holding positions requiring a higher education degree in law	Insignia
Highest officials	1st class Active State Councillor of the Russian Federation		1st class Active State Councillor of Justitia of the Russian Federation	
Highest officials	2nd class Active State Councillor of the Russian Federation		2nd class Active State Councillor of Justitia of the Russian Federation	
Highest officials	3rd class Active State Councillor of the Russian Federation		3rd class Active State Councillor of Justitia of the Russian Federation	
Main officials	1st class State Councillor of the Russian Federation		1st class State Councillor of Justitia of the Russian Federation	
Main officials	2nd class State Councillor of the Russian Federation		2nd class State Councillor of Justitia of the Russian Federation	
Main officials	3rd class State Councillor of the Russian Federation		3rd class State Councillor of Justitia of the Russian Federation	
Leading officials	1st class Councillor of the state civilian service of the Russian Federation		1st class Councillor of Justitia	
Leading officials	2nd class Councillor of the state civilian service of the Russian Federation		2nd class Councillor of Justitia	
Leading officials	3rd class Councillor of the state civilian service of the Russian Federation		3rd class Councillor of Justitia	
Senior officials	1st class Referent of the state civilian service of the Russian Federation		1st class Jurist	
Senior officials	2nd class Referent of the state civilian service of the Russian Federation		2nd class Jurist	
Senior officials	3rd class Referent of the state civilian service of the Russian Federation		3rd class Jurist	
Junior officials	1st class Secretary of the state civilian service of the Russian Federation		–	
Junior officials	2nd class Secretary of the state civilian service of the Russian Federation		–	
Junior officials	3rd class Secretary of the state civilian service of the Russian Federation		–	

== Regional ranks and insignia ==
Category	Ranks	Insignia
Highest officials	1st class Active state councillor of [name of the federal subject]	
Highest officials	2nd class Active state councillor of [name of the federal subject]	
Highest officials	3rd class Active state councillor of [name of the federal subject]	
Main officials	1st class State councillor of [name of the federal subject]	
Main officials	2nd class State councillor of [name of the federal subject]	
Main officials	3rd class State councillor of [name of the federal subject]	
Leading officials	1st class Councillor of the state civilian service of [name of the federal subject]	
Leading officials	2nd class Councillor of the state civilian service of [name of the federal subject]	
Leading officials	3rd class Councillor of the state civilian service of [name of the federal subject]	
Senior officials	1st class Referent of the state civilian service of [name of the federal subject]	
Senior officials	2nd class Referent of the state civilian service of [name of the federal subject]	
Senior officials	3rd class Referent of the state civilian service of [name of the federal subject]	
Junior officials	1st class Secretary of the state civilian service of [name of the federal subject]	
Junior officials	2nd class Secretary of the state civilian service of [name of the federal subject]	
Junior officials	3rd class Secretary of the state civilian service of [name of the federal subject]	

== Municipal ranks and insignia ==
Category	Ranks	Insignia
Highest officials	1st class Active municipal councillor	
Highest officials	2nd class Active municipal councillor	
Highest officials	3rd class Active municipal councillor	
Main officials	1st class Municipal councillor	
Main officials	2nd class Municipal councillor	
Main officials	3rd class Municipal councillor	
Leading officials	1st class Councillor of the municipal service	
Leading officials	2nd class Councillor of the municipal service	
Leading officials	3rd class Councillor of the municipal service	
Senior officials	1st class Referent of the municipal service	
Senior officials	2nd class Referent of the municipal service	
Senior officials	3rd class Referent of the municipal service	
Junior officials	1st class Secretary of the municipal service	
Junior officials	2nd class Secretary of the municipal service	
Junior officials	3rd class Secretary of the municipal service	

== See also ==
- Diplomatic ranks of the Russian Federation
- Prosecutors' ranks in the Russian Federation
- Special ranks of the Investigative Committee of Russia
- Army ranks and insignia of the Russian Federation
- Naval ranks and insignia of the Russian Federation
- Table of Ranks
