= Presidential Executive Office =

Executive office of the President of Russia

The Presidential Executive Office or Presidential Administration, is the executive office of the President of Russia. It was created by a decree of Boris Yeltsin on 19 July 1991 as an institution supporting the activity of the president and the vice-president.

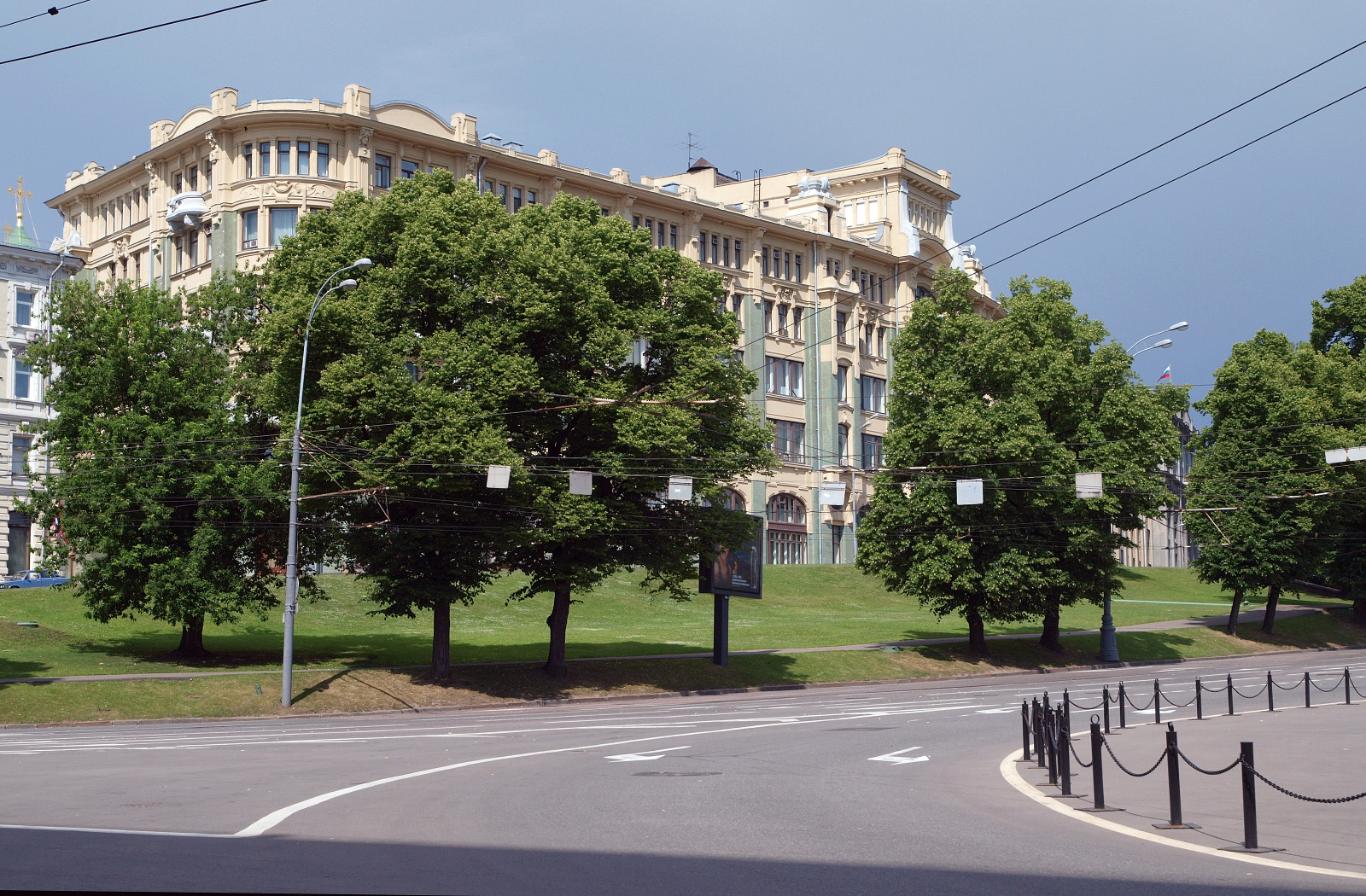
Part of the offices of the Presidential Executive Office are located in an Art Nouveau building at Moscow's 8 Staraya Square (next to the former seat of the Central Committee of the Communist Party of the Soviet Union).

The chief of staff of the Presidential Executive Office, his deputies, heads of main directorates and services and their deputies are appointed by the president of Russia and do not need to be approved by any other government body. Other staff are appointed by the chief of staff of the Presidential Executive Office.

== History ==
The Constitution of Russia states that the president of Russia forms the Presidential Administration.

On 2 October 1996, Boris Yeltsin signed a decree approving the Regulations of Presidential Administration of Russia.

On 25 March 2004, Vladimir Putin undertook a major reorganisation of this institution by a decree. Only two deputy chiefs remained out of seven. The Press Office and the Information Office were merged into the Press and Information Office, and the Pardon Directorate and the Citizenship Directorate were merged into the Directorate for Protecting Citizens' Constitutional Rights. The Personnel Directorate and the State Decorations Directorate were merged into the Personnel and State Decorations Directorate, the Protocol Directorate and the Organisation Directorate were merged into the Protocol and Organization Directorate. The Territorial Directorate was included in the Domestic Policy Directorate. The Economic Directorate was abolished, while the Civil Service Directorate was created.

The Presidential Executive Office of Russia is situated in Moscow, where it holds offices in several buildings in Kitay-gorod and inside the Kremlin.

== Role in modern Russia ==
Initially the Presidential Administration of Russia was conceived as kind of office of the head of state. However, since Putin came to power this public body has assumed an enhanced role. On 9 May 2000, the newspaper Kommersant had published the document called «Revision number Six», which was the reform project of Presidential Administration. Before the text of the document, editor-in-chief wrote: «the fact that such program is being developing is very important it is in itself … if this will be a reality, almost of the entire population of Russia – from politicians and governors to ordinary voters – will be under surveillance by secret services». This document was published again in 2010.

Furthermore, on 9 May 2000, the newspaper Kommersant had published the article by deputy editor-in-chief Veronika Kutsyllo, according to which the text of «Revision number Six» had been provided to journalists by anonymous employee of the Presidential Administration; Putin was mentioned in the text of this document as acting President and the attached charts, totalling more than 100 pages, were drawn up before 1999 Russian legislative election, and these facts created the reason to believe that the work on this document started long before 2000 Russian presidential election.

The authors of «Revision number Six» stated that Russian social and political system at the time was self-regulatory that was totally unacceptable to Putin who wished that all social and political processes in Russia were completely managed by one single body. The Presidential Administration and, more specifically, its Domestic Policy Directorate was to be such body.

The authors of «Revision number Six» rejected the possibility of direct prohibition on opposition activities and independent mass media activities considering that Russian society was not ready for that, and it was the reason, they proposed that Domestic Policy Directorate of the Presidential Administration uses the combination of public and secret activities. Secret activities were to be carried out with the direct use of special services, in particular, Federal Security Service. The main objective of such secret activity was to take control over activity of political parties, community and political leaders, governors, legislatures, candidates for elective positions, election commissions and election officials, mass media and journalists. To achieve this objective, the following tasks were set: 1) the collection information (including dirt) about individuals and organizations of interests and the pressure on them; 2) the creation of conditions under which independent mass media cannot operate; 3) taking control over elections to ensure the victories of pro-Kremlin candidates; 4) the establishment of civil society organizations which are ostensibly independent but actually are under the full control of the Kremlin; 5) the discredit the opposition and the creation of the informational and political barrier around Putin (good things happen thanks to Putin personally but bad officials are responsible for bad things and not Putin; Putin doesn’t respond to opposition’s charge and doesn’t participate in debates – others do that for him).

According to Vasily Gatov, the analyst of Annenberg School for Communication and Journalism at the University of Southern California, the realizations of the provisions of «Revision number Six» means building the state where democratic institutions exist nominally but in reality these institutions are fully controlled by Presidential Administration and secret police. He characterized such regime as «counterintelligence state» (one of the kinds of guided democracy).

On 7 May 2016, the newspaper Kommersant had published an article by Ilya Barabanov and Gleb Cherkasov containing an analysis of the implementation of provisions of «Revision number Six». They concluded that, although the authors of «Revision number Six» had not taken into account some things (for example, authors of the aforementioned document denied the need for creation of pro-Kremlin political party, which actually was established subsequently), by and large, the provisions of «Revision number Six» were conducted.

== Organization ==
Appointer: President of the Russian Federation

Vladimir Putin

Executive: PEO Chief of Staff

Anton Vaino (since 12 August 2016)

First Deputy Chiefs of Staff of the Presidential Executive Office:

- Sergei Kiriyenko
- Alexei Gromov

Deputy Chiefs of Staff of the Presidential Executive Office:

- Dmitry Kozak
- Maxim Oreshkin
- Vladimir Ostrovenko

Deputy Chief of Staff of the Presidential Executive Office and Presidential Press Secretary

- Dmitry Peskov

Aides to the President:

- Larisa Brychyova (Head of the Presidential State-Legal Directorate)
- Alexei Dyumin
- Ruslan Edelgeriev
- Andrei Fursenko
- Vladimir Medinsky
- Dmitry Mironov
- Nikolai Patrushev
- Yury Ushakov
- Dmitry Kalimulin (Head of the Presidential Speechwriting Office)
- Dmitry Shalkov (Head of the Presidential Control Directorate)

Chief of the Presidential Protocol

- Vladislav Kitayev

Advisers to the President:

- Anton Kobyakov
- Igor Levitin
- Valery Fadeyev (Chairman of the Presidential Council for Civil Society and Human Rights)
- Elena Yampolskaya
- Alan Gagloyev (former President of South Ossetia)

Presidential Commissioner for Children's Rights

- Maria Lvova-Belova (since October 2021)

Presidential Commissioner for Entrepreneurs' Rights

- Boris Titov (since June 2012)

=== Presidential Envoys to Federal districts of Russia ===
The Federal districts of Russia are a level of administration for the convenience of the federal government and have been organised in 2000. They are not the constituent units of Russia (which are the federal subjects). Each district includes several federal subjects and each federal district has a presidential envoy (whose official title is Plenipotentiary Representative). The official task of the Plenipotentiary Representative is simply to oversee the work of federal agencies in the regions, although in practice this oversight is extensive and of considerable consequence. Federal districts' envoys serve as liaisons between the federal subjects and the federal government and are primarily responsible for overseeing the compliance of the federal subjects with the federal laws.

This institution is organised as follows:

- Central Federal District
  - Georgy Poltavchenko (18 May 2000 – 6 September 2011)
  - Oleg Govorun (6 September 2011 – 23 May 2012)
  - Alexander Beglov (23 May 2012 – 25 December 2017)
  - Alexei Gordeyev (25 December 2017 – 26 June 2018)
  - Igor Shchyogolev (since 26 June 2018)
- Southern Federal District
  - Victor Kazantsev (18 May 2000 – 9 March 2004)
  - Vladimir Yakovlev (9 March 2004 – 13 September 2004)
  - Dmitry Kozak (13 September 2004 – 24 September 2007)
  - Grigory Rapota (24 September 2007 – 12 May 2008)
  - Vladimir Ustinov (since 12 May 2008)
- Northwestern Federal District
  - Victor Cherkesov (18 May 2000 – 11 March 2003)
  - Valentina Matviyenko (11 March 2003 – 15 October 2003)
  - Ilya Klebanov (1 November 2003 – 6 September 2011)
  - Nikolai Vinnichenko (6 September 2011 – 11 March 2013)
  - Vladimir Bulavin (11 March 2013 – 28 July 2016)
  - Nikolai Tsukanov (28 July 2016 - 25 December 2017)
  - Alexander Beglov (25 December 2017 – 7 November 2018)
  - Alexander Gutsan (since 7 November 2018)
- Far Eastern Federal District
  - Konstantin Pulikovsky (18 May 2000 – 14 November 2005)
  - Kamil Iskhakov (14 November 2005 – 2 October 2007)
  - Oleg Safonov (30 November 2007 – 30 April 2009)
  - Victor Ishayev (30 April 2009 – 31 August 2013)
  - Yury Trutnev (since 31 August 2013)
- Siberian Federal District
  - Leonid Drachevsky (18 May 2000 – 9 September 2004)
  - Anatoly Kvashnin (9 September 2004 – 9 September 2010)
  - Victor Tolokonsky (9 September 2010 – 12 May 2014)
  - Nikolai Rogozhkin (12 May 2014 – 28 July 2016)
  - Sergei Menyaylo (28 July 2016 – 9 April 2021)
  - Anatoly Seryshev (since 12 October 2021)
- Ural Federal District
  - Pyotr Latyshev (18 May 2000 – 2 December 2008)
  - Nikolai Vinnichenko (8 December 2008 – 6 September 2011)
  - Yevgeny Kuyvashev (6 September 2011 – 14 May 2012)
  - Igor Kholmanskikh (18 May 2012 – 26 June 2018)
  - Nikolai Tsukanov (26 June 2018 – 9 November 2020)
  - Vladimir Yakushev (9 November 2020 – 24 September 2024)
  - Artem Zhoga (since 2 October 2024)
- Volga Federal District
  - Sergei Kiriyenko (18 May 2000 – 14 November 2005)
  - Alexander Konovalov (14 November 2005 – 12 May 2008)
  - Grigory Rapota (12 May 2008 – 15 December 2011)
  - Mikhail Babich (15 December 2011 – 24 August 2018)
  - Igor Panshin (24 August 2018 – 7 September 2018)
  - Igor Komarov (since 7 September 2018)
- North Caucasian Federal District
  - Alexander Khloponin (19 January 2010 – 12 May 2014)
  - Sergei Melikov (12 May 2014 – 28 July 2016)
  - Oleg Belaventsev (since 28 July 2016)
  - Alexander Matovnikov (26 June 2018 - 22 January 2020)
  - Yury Chaika (since 22 January 2020)
- Crimean Federal District (abolished)
  - Oleg Belaventsev (21 March 2014 – 28 July 2016)

=== Presidential Envoys to Branches of Federal Power ===
The Presidential Plenipotentiary Representative in the Federal Assembly:

- Alexander Yakovlev (18 February 1994 – 10 February 1996)

The Presidential Plenipotentiary Representative in the Federation Council:

- Anatoly Sliva (10 February 1996 – 27 October 1998)
- Yury Yarov (7 December 1998 – 13 April 1999)
- Vyacheslav Khizhnyakov (12 May 1999 – 5 April 2004)
- Alexander Kotenkov (5 April 2004 – 29 October 2013)
- Artur Muravyov (since 29 October 2013)

The Presidential Plenipotentiary Representative in the State Duma:

- Alexander Kotenkov (10 February 1996 – 5 April 2004)
- Alexander Kosopkin (5 April 2004 – 9 January 2009)
- Andrey Podavalov (22 January 2009 – 12 February 2009, acting)
- Garry Minkh (since 12 February 2009)

The Presidential Plenipotentiary Representative in the Constitutional Court:

- Valery Savitsky (24 April 1995 – 5 February 1996)
- Mikhail Mityukov (5 February – 7 December 1996)
- Sergei Shakhray (7 December 1996 – 29 June 1998)
- Mikhail Mityukov (29 June 1998 – 7 November 2005)
- Mikhail Krotov (7 November 2005 – 31 January 2020)
- Alexander Konovalov (31 January 2020 – 16 April 2025)
- Dmitry Mezentsev (17 April 2025–)

== Subdivisions ==
- Security Council Office
- Offices of the Plenipotentiary Envoys to the Federal Districts
- Presidential Advisers' Office
- State-Legal Directorate
- Presidential Chancellery
- Control Directorate (Chiefs: Yuri Boldyrev (1992–1993), Alexei Ilyushenko (19 March 1993 – ), Vladimir Zaytsev (1995–1996), Alexei Kudrin (1 August 1996 – 26 March 1997), Vladimir Putin (26 March 1997 – May 1998), Nikolai Patrushev (31 May 1998 – October 1998), Yevgeny Lisov (October 1998 – 13 January 2004), Valery Nazarov (13 January 2004 – 12 March 2004), Alexander Beglov (27 May 2004 – at most till 2009), Konstantin Chuychenko (at least since 2009)
- Presidential Speechwriters' Directorate
- Secretariat of the Chief of Staff of the Presidential Executive Office
- Domestic Policy Directorate
- Foreign Policy Directorate
- Personnel and State Decorations Directorate (since 25 March 2004)
- Personnel Directorate (until 25 March 2004)
- State Decorations Directorate (until 25 March 2004)
- Civil Service Directorate (since 25 March 2004)
- Directorate for Protecting Citizens' Constitutional Rights (since 25 March 2004)
- Pardon Directorate
- Citizenship Directorate (until 25 March 2004)
- Document Processing Directorate
- Directorate for Communication and Public Feedback
- Press and Information Office (since 25 March 2004)
- Press Office (until 25 March 2004)
- Information Office (until 25 March 2004)
- Protocol and Organization Directorate (since 25 March 2004)
- Protocol Directorate (until 25 March 2004)
- Organization Directorate (until 25 March 2004)
- Experts' Directorate
- Directorate for Interregional Relations and Cultural Contacts with Foreign Countries
- Territorial Directorate (until 25 March 2004)
- Economic Directorate (until 25 March 2004)
- Cossacks Directorate (7 August 1998 – 25 February 2003)
- Archive of the President of the Russian Federation (since 1998)

== PEO former staffers ==
First Deputy Chiefs of Staff of the Presidential Executive Office:

- Sergei Krasavchenko (16 June 1993 – 7 August 1996)
- Vladimir Zaytsev (27 January 1995 – 14 February 1996)
- Alexander Kazakov (19 July 1996 – 13 November 1997)
- Yury Yarov (28 March 1997 – 7 December 1998)
- Vladimir Putin (25 May 1998 — 25 July 1998)
- Oleg Sysuev (16 September 1998 — 22 June 1999)
- Igor Shabdurasulov (3 September 1999 — 7 May 2000)
- Dmitry Medvedev (3 June 2000 – 30 October 2003)
- Dmitry Kozak (30 October 2003 – 9 March 2004)
- Vladislav Surkov (12 May 2008 – 27 December 2011)
- Vyacheslav Volodin (27 December 2011 – 5 October 2016)

Deputy Chiefs of Staff of the Presidential Executive Office:

- Sergei Yastrzhembsky (1997–1998)
- Dzhakhan Pollyeva (1998 – March 2004)
- Sergei Prikhodko (1998 – March 2004)
- Dmitry Kozak (May 1999 – August 1999, 4 June 2000 – 30 October 2003)
- Alexander Abramov (1999 – March 2004)
- Vladislav Surkov (August 1999 – December 2011)
- Yevgeny Lisov (until 12 January 2004)
- Victor Ivanov (2000 – March 2004)
- Igor Shuvalov (October 2003 – March 2004)

Aides to the President:

- Sergei Prikhodko (1997 1998, March 2004)
- Igor Shuvalov (June – October 2003, March 2004 – )
- Igor Sergeyev (28 March 2001 – 30 March 2004)
- Yevgeny Shaposhnikov (March 1997 – 30 March 2004)
- Aslambek Aslakhanov (October 2003 – March 2004)
- Igor Sechin (March 2004 – May 2008)
- Vladislav Surkov (March 2004 – December 2011)

Press Attache for the President:

Natalia Timakova

Chief of the Presidential Protocol:

Igor Shchyogolev

Advisers to the President:

- Galina Starovoytova (for International Relations issues, 20 July 1991 — 4 November 1992)
- Alexander Granberg (1992 — 1993)
- Shamil Tarpishchev (for Physical Training and Sports, 1992 – 1994)
- Ekaterina Lakhova (for Family, Maternity and Childhood issues, August 1992 — January 1994)
- Dmitry Volkogonov (for Defense and Security, 24 September 1992 — 24 January 1994)
- Valentin Yumashev (13 August 1996 — 11 March 1997)
- Tatyana Yumasheva (28 June 1997 – 3 January 2000)
- Yuli Vorontsov (for Foreign Policy, 1998 – 2000)
- Mikhail Zurabov (1998 – 1999, 2007 – 2009)
- Vladimir Shevchenko (for special affairs, 2000 – )
- Andrei Illarionov (for Economy, 12 April 2000 – 25 December 2005)
- Sergei Samoylov (for Federalism and Local Government, 2001 – )
- Anatoly Pristavkin (for Pardon, 29 December 2001 – 11 July 2008)
- Sergei Karaganov (for Foreign Policy, 2002 – )
- Gennady Troshev (for Cossacks, 25 February 2003 – 7 May 2008)
- Alexander Burutin (for Military Technology and Industry, April 2003 – 2007)
- Aslambek Aslakhanov (for North Caucasus, March 2004 – 2008)
- Yury Laptev (for Culture, April 2004 – )
- Mikhail Lesin (for Mass Media and Information Technologies, April 2004 – 17 November 2009)
- Veniamin Yakovlev (31 January 2005 – 24 July 2018)
- Murat Zyazikov (for Cossacks, 31 October 2008 — 26 January 2012)
- Victor Chernomyrdin (11 June 2009 — 3 November 2010)
- Alexander Bedritsky (on Climate Change, 27 November 2009 – 22 June 2018)
- Leonid Reiman (13 May 2008 — 10 September 2010)
- Mikhail Fedotov (12 October 2010 – 22 October 2019)
- Mikhail Abyzov (18 January 2012 – 2018)
- Sergei Glazyev (30 July 2012 – 9 October 2019)
- Vladimir Vasilyev (5 October 2020 — 29 September 2021)

== See also ==
- Executive Office of the President, the equivalent United States body
- Imperial Household Agency in Japan
