= Altaigate scandal =

Coordinates: 49°N 89°E

The Altaigate Scandal is the name given to the events surrounding the 9 January 2009 disappearance of an Mi-171 helicopter in the south of the Altai Republic. The helicopter contained several VIP passengers. The helicopter was later found as a result of large-scale rescue operations on 11 January 2009. It was discovered on the Sailughem mountain ridge 8 kilometers from the border between Russia and Mongolia. Seven people were killed, two were severely injured, and two sustained mild injuries. Among those dead was the Representative of the Russian president to the State Duma Mr. Aleksandr Kosopkin, the Head of the Altai Republic Game Management Agency Mr. Kaimin, two pilots, and one locally famous musician. Among the survivors were Deputy Governor of the Altai Republic Mr. Anatoly Bannykh, the second pilot, and two others, one of whom was heavily injured.

== Game hunting allegation ==
When the first photos were published from the crash site, some conservationists claimed that the Mi-171 helicopter crashed as a result of illegal game hunting straight from the helicopter. This type of hunting is forbidden by law Criminal Code of Russia Article 258. Conservationists claimed that the game being hunted (argali) would have been protected animals listed in the Red Data Book, which is a legally binding, full protection species fact sheet in Russian, as well as the IUCN Red List Argali IUCN Factsheet.

There have been calls to the president of Russia and the state chief prosecutor to launch an investigation into this alleged case of poaching and corruption, which led to the fatal helicopter crash . So far the prosecutors have investigated only the technical reasons of the helicopter crash despite immediate appeals from Russian conservationists and public. Only on 21 April, the criminal investigation on poaching started as well as legal notice of the Main Investigations Committee of the Chief State Prosecutor Office.

Altaigate Scandal development was reported on by the local Altapress Agency.

== Public reaction ==
WWF Russia and Greenpeace collected over 6000 verified signatures from the Russian public as part of a petition demanding criminal investigation on poaching and corruption. Despite the legal obligation that the criminal investigation on a reported case should be started within three days, there has been no public information or official announcements.

== Timeline ==
- 21 January 2010 - Article in English by Vladimir Ryzhkov - Poaching the Law - in The Moscow Times. Recent update on the still continued scandal.
- 29 July 2009 - Russian Ministry of Justice suggested to remove poaching from Criminal to Administrative law violations - meaning that whoever is convicted as a poacher will not have any crime record filed. This has still to be adopted by the State Duma
- 17-24 July 2009 - rapid adoption by the Duma and the President of the New Federal Law on Game-Hunting text at the President of Russia portal in Russian; many NGOs and even hunters call this law "barbarian" and the main disagreement is that there will be now a legal provision for VIP officials to have private hunting grounds in the long-term rent which, as expected, will seriously suppress the rights of the local subsistence hunters.
- 12 June 2009 - MAC International Aviation Committee published full report on the crash investigation full text 56 pages in Russian in pdf that indeed confirms that shooting from the helicopter at low altitudes was the main reason of the crash.

== Opinions on Altaigate ==
Alexei Vaisman from WWF Russia:

Over the last decade, Altai has become a place where helicopter hunting has become rather common. They shoot directly from the helicopter and then land to pick up any trophies. We don’t want anyone to be imprisoned. The main aim of our actions is to make a court give an official legal assessment of what happened. Regional officials often treat federal officials to free hunting trips. It’s not a bribe, it’s to make good relations, to get additional money to the region from the federal center.

Sergey Mironov, speaker of the Federation Council of Russia in his blog: "I still believe that investigation has to consider all (I stress - all!) the circumstances of this case and make full legal assessment. This case indeed raises many questions..." Source in Russian: citation from the blog of Mr. Mironov
