= Garry Minkh =

Russian politician

- Гарри Минх
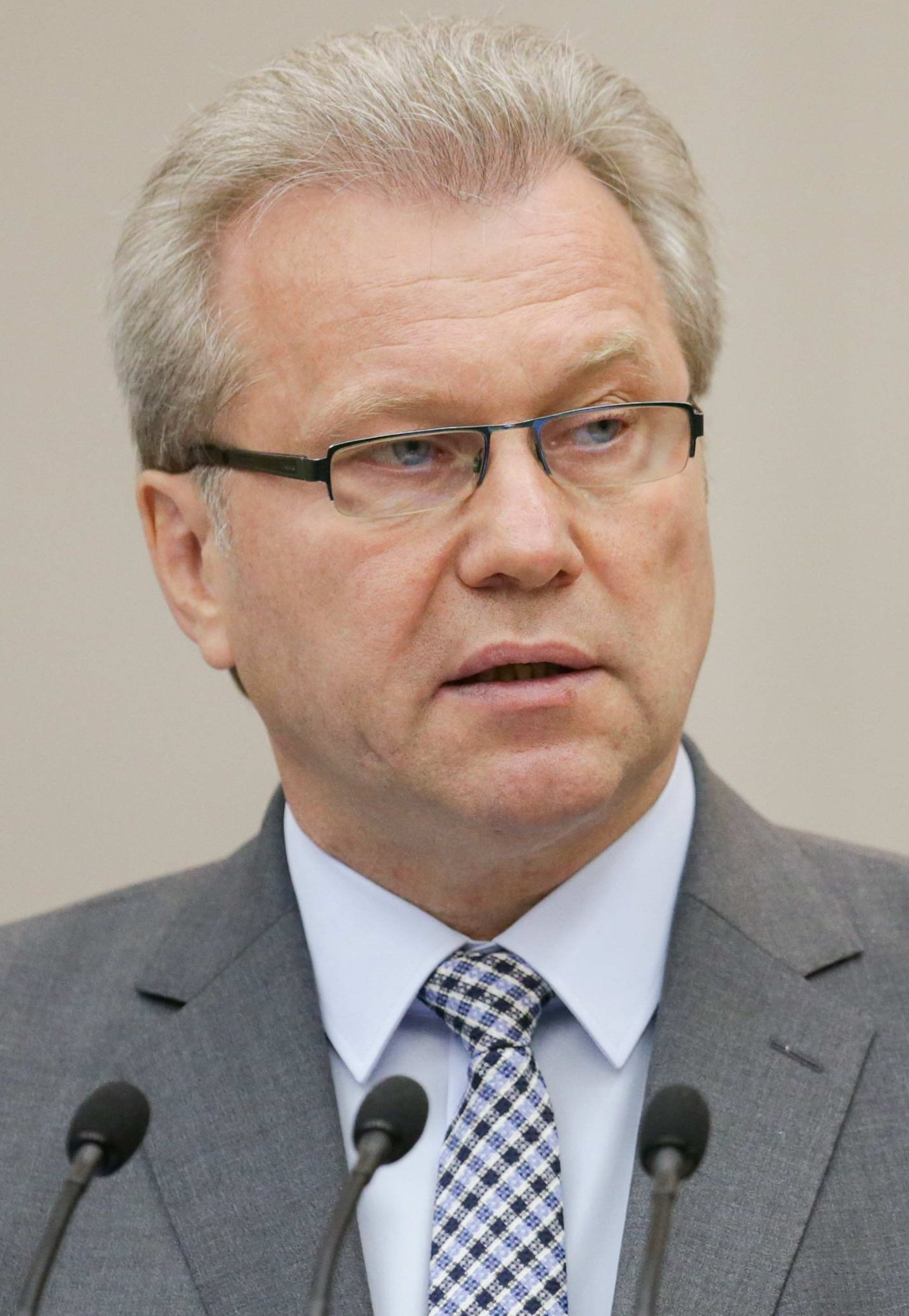
- Minkh in 2018

Presidential Plenipotentiary Representative in the State Duma
- Incumbent
- Assumed office 12 February 2009
- President: Vladimir Putin
- Preceded by: Andrey Podavalov (acting)

Personal details
- Born: 1 February 1959 (age 67) Tomsk, Russian SFSR, Soviet Union

Garry Vladimirovich Minkh (Russian: Гарри Владимирович Минх; born 1 February 1959) is a Russian politician and lawyer who is currently the plenipotentiary of the President of the Russia in the State Duma. He has the federal state civilian service rank of 1st class Active State Councillor of the Russian Federation.

He is a candidate of Legal Sciences. He was awarded the title of Honoured Lawyer of Russia in 1996. He is also one of the authors of the 2001 Legal Encyclopedia.

== Biography ==
Garry Minkh was born on 1 February 1959 to a German family. He graduated from Tomsk Secondary School No. 6. In 1981, he graduated from Tomsk State University with a degree in law. In 1988, he undertook postgraduate study at the Faculty of Law of Moscow State University. He was part of the administrative and teaching work at Tomsk State University between 1981 and 1985 and 1988 and 1992. He currently teaches at the Faculty of Law at the National Research University Higher School of Economics, and is a professor at the Department of Constitutional and Municipal Law at the Higher School of Economics.

Since 1992, Minkh has worked in the Presidential Administration, where he held the positions of head of a sector, deputy head of a department - head of a sector, deputy head of a department - head of a department in the Main State Legal Directorate. From 2000 to 2002, he was the Deputy Head of the Main State Legal Directorate.

From 2002 to 2004, Minkh was the Plenipotentiary Representative of the Government of Russia in the Federation Council. In 2004, he moved to the Apparatus of the Government of Russia, where he was Director of the Legal Department until 2009.

In 2004, Minkh worked in the campaign headquarters of Vladimir Putin, in 2008, he was the chief lawyer of the campaign headquarters of Dmitry Medvedev. On 12 February 2009, Minkh became the Plenipotentiary Representative in the State Duma.

== Personal life ==
=== Property and income ===
According to official data, Minkh's income for 2011 amounted to 4,680,000 rubles, while the spouse had no income. Together with his wife, Minkh owns a land plot with an area of 17 acres, a dacha with outbuildings, a guest house, 3 apartments and two cars.

According to the data posted in the declaration containing information on income, expenses, property and property obligations of persons holding government positions in Russia, in 2018 Minkh earned 13 391 942 rubles, for 2019 - 143.7 million rubles (in 11 times more). His wife's income for the same period amounted to 881,468 rubles.

=== Incidents ===
On 19 January 2011, driving along the Rublevo-Uspenskoe highway, Minkh in BMW 5 Series with registration number A073MP97, collided with an Opel Astra, driven by a 23-year-old woman. As a result of the accident, Minkh's driver, Vladimir Shugaev died. Minkh escaped with an abrasion, and the driver of the Opel Astra was hospitalized in serious condition. According to the results of the investigation, Minkh's driver was found guilty of the accident.
