= Aleksandr Garnovskii =

Aleksandr Dmitriyevich Garnovskii
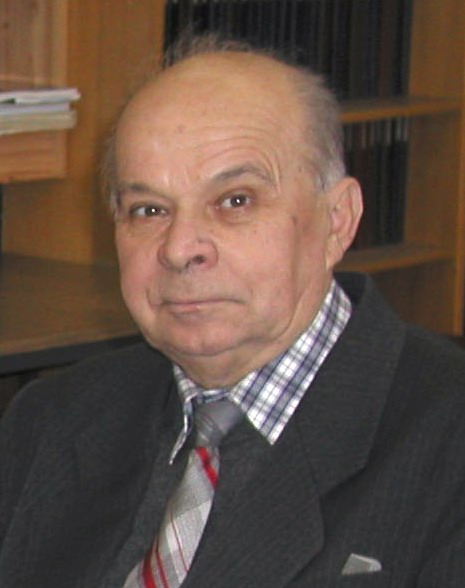
- Born: Vladimir Aleksandrovich Barykin; Александр Дмитриевич Гарновский; 30 August 1932; Rostov-on-Don
- Died: 9 December 2010 (aged 78); Rostov-on-Don
- Occupation: chemist

Aleksandr Dmitriyevich Garnovskii (Russian: Александр Дмитриевич Гарновский; 30 August 1932 in Rostov-on-Don – 9 December 2010 in Rostov-on-Don) was a Russian chemist. Doctor of Chemical Sciences, Professor.

== Biography ==
Aleksandr Dmitriyevich Garnovskii graduated from the Chemical Faculty of Rostov State University in 1956. In 1961—1979 he also worked there; since 1974 he was a Professor of the Department of Physical and Colloid Chemistry of the RSU. In 1979—1983 he was the head of the Department of Chemistry of Rostov Institute of Agricultural Engineering (now Don State Technical University). Since 1983 he was the head of the Department of Chemistry of Coordination Compounds of the Research Institute of Physical and Organic Chemistry of the RSU.

Garnovskii was a specialist in the field of chemistry of heterocyclic and coordination compounds. He developed original techniques for the production of a number of azomethine and azole compounds, stereo- and regioselective synthesis of their complexes with various metals. He formulated the rules of nucleophilic and electrophilic substitution in a series of imidazole derivatives; he also formulated and substantiated the laws of competitive coordination of ambiguous chelating ligands. He carried out a series of studies on tribochemical synthesis of coordination compounds.

Garnovskii was a member of the editorial board of the Journal of Coordination Chemistry. He was the author of more than 800 scientific works, 11 monographs. He had 30 copyright certificates of the USSR and 3 patents of the Russian Federation. Today he is one of the most cited chemists in Russia.

He was a laureate of the State Prize of the USSR (1989) and Lev Chugaev Prize (Russian Academy of Sciences, 2003), and Honoured Scientist of the Russian Federation (1997), an Honorary Worker of Higher Professional Education of the Russian Federation (2002) and a Member of Russian Academy of Natural Sciences (1992).

== Selected works ==
- Мискиджьян С. П., Гарновский А. Д. Введение в современную теорию кислот и оснований. — Киев: Вища школа, 1979. 152 с.
- Гарновский А. Д.. Садименко А. П., Осипов О. А., Цинцадзе Г. В. Жестко-мягкие взаимодействия в координационной химии. Ростов н/Д: Ростов: РГУ, 1986. 272 с.
- A.D.Garnovskii, B.I.Kharisov, V.V.Skopenko, L.M.Blanco, N.N.Kokozay, A.S.Kuzharov, D.A.Garnovskii, O.Yu.Vassilyeva, A.S.Burlov, V.A.Pavlenko. Direct Synthesis of Coordination and Organometallic Compounds (A.D.Garnovskii and B.I.Kharisov, Eds.). — Elsevier, Amsterdam, 1999.
- L.M.Blanco, A.D.Garnovskii, D.A.Garnovskii, B.I.Kharisov, M.A.Mendez-Rojas, I.S.Vasilchenko. Synthetic Coordination and Organometallic Chemistry. (A.D.Garnovskii and B.I.Kharisov, Eds.). — Marcel Dekker, New York — Basel, 2003.
- Скопенко В. В. Цивадзе А. Ю. Савранский Л. И. Гарновский А. Д. Координационная химия. Учебное пособие для вузов. — М.: Академкнига, 2007. 487 с.
