= Vyacheslav Khizhnyakov =

Russian politician

- Вячеслав Хижняков

Presidential Plenipotentiary Representative to the Federation Council
- In office 12 May 1999 – 5 April 2004
- President: Boris Yeltsin; Vladimir Putin
- Preceded by: Yury Yarov
- Succeeded by: Alexander Kotenkov

Ataman of the military Cossack society "Great Don Army"
- In office 1997 – 12 May 1999
- Succeeded by: Viktor Vodolatsky

Head of Volgodonsk
- In office 1991–1996

Personal details
- Born: 6 February 1952 (age 74) Nogliki, Russian SFSR, Soviet Union
- Education: Rostov Institute of Agricultural Engineering
- Awards: Order of Friendship

Vyacheslav Fadeyevich Khizhnyakov (Russian: Вячеслав Фадеевич Хижняков; born 6 February 1952) is a Russian politician who served as the third Plenipotentiary Representative of the President of Russia to the Federation Council from 1999 to 2004. He was the Ataman of the Don Cossacks, and the first ataman of the military Cossack society "Great Don Army" from 1997 to 1999.

He has the federal state civilian service rank of 1st class Active State Councillor of the Russian Federation.

== Biography ==
Vyacheslav Khizhnyakov was born on 6 February 1952. From 1969 to 1975, he was a mechanic at the Volgodonsk chemical plant. In 1975, he graduated from the Rostov Institute of Agricultural Engineering with a degree as a foundry engineer. From 1975 to 1983, he was a foreman, then senior foreman, and then the head of the casting shop, and chief metallurgist of Pishmash Production Association in Kirovograd. From 1983 to 1986, he was the head of the PDO of the Volgodonsk plant of radio equipment. From 1987 to 1990, he was the deputy director for Production and Sales, Secretary of the Party Committee of the Volgodonsk Experimental Plant. From 1990 to 1991, he was the Deputy Chairman of the executive committee of the Volgodonsk City Council of People's Deputies, which he supervised on economic issues.

From 1991 to 1996, Khizhnyakov was the head of Volgodonsk. In 1993, Khizhnyakov ran for the elections to the State Duma from the Choice of Russia party, but was not elected. From 1996 to 1999, he was an advisor to the Governor of Rostov Oblast, and then the Deputy Governor of Rostov Oblast for Cossacks and Ecology. From 1997 to 1999, Khizhnyakov became the first military ataman of the military Cossack society "Great Don Army".

On 12 May 1999, Khizhnyakov became the Plenipotentiary Representative of the President of Russia to the Federation Council.

The press has repeatedly accused Khizhnyakov of maintaining ties with the entrepreneur and head of the Olimp criminal group Yevgeny Kudryavtsev. Khizhnyakov was removed from the post as Plenipotentiary Representative in the Federation Council on 5 April 2004, after a commission of the Ministry of Internal Affairs conducted an investigation in Volgodonsk into mass extortion from entrepreneurs by members of Olimp. He was appointed assistant to the Plenipotentiary Representative in the Central Federal District instead.

== Family ==
Khizhnyakov is married and has two daughters.
