= Archive of the President of the Russian Federation =

Archives

Coordinates: 55°45′N 37°38′E

The Archive of the President of the Russian Federation (Russian: Архив Президента Российской Федерации) is a Russian state archive established in 1991 and managed by the Presidential Administration of Russia. It remains classified almost entirely and preserves records of the President of Russia and Presidential Administration of Russia, as well as documents of the highest organs of the Communist Party of the Soviet Union. Since 1994, Politburo files and files from the Additional Central Committee have been transferred to the Russian State Archive of Contemporary History.

== Archives ==
=== Joseph Stalin ===
In June 1992, it was discovered that many papers written by Joseph Stalin are kept by the Archive of the President of the Russian Federation. Along with documents, they have also been holding many telegraphs made by Stalin during the Cold War. The archive has been holding Stalin's "Shooting lists" since March 2013.

=== Korean War ===
The archive has kept many documents and filings from the Korean War.
