= Stalin's shooting lists =

People approved for execution, 1936–1938

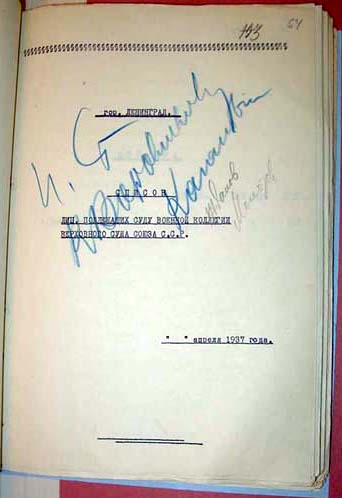
April 1937 Leningrad list, signed by Stalin, Molotov and others

Stalin's shooting lists (Russian: Ста́линские расстре́льные спи́ски) were the lists of extrajudicially accused persons submitted to the Military Collegium of the Supreme Court of the USSR, after the endorsement by Joseph Stalin and other members of the Politburo, for issuing a verdict, typically execution by shooting, either by an individual or a firing squad.

Official records put the total number of documented executions between 1937 and 1938 during the Soviet Great Purge at 681,692. Of these, around 44,000 had their sentences personally approved by Stalin or his closest aides, with Stalin's initials appearing on 357 of the lists.

The lists are currently held at the Archive of the President of the Russian Federation. They were published in March 2013.

== See also ==
- Album procedure
- Great Purge
- Death dates of victims of the Great Purge
