= Viktor Vodolatsky =

Russian politician

- Виктор Водолацкий
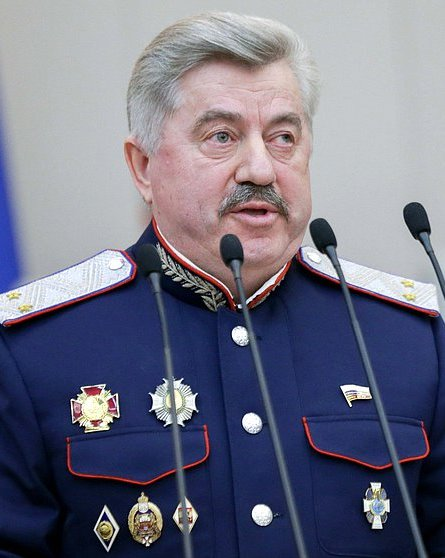
- Vodolatsky in 2019

Member of the State Duma
- Incumbent
- Assumed office 2 December 2007

Deputy Governor of Rostov Oblast
- In office 6 June 2012 – 12 November 2012
- In office 1999–2007

Military chieftain of the "Great Don Army"
- In office 12 May 1999 – 2013
- Preceded by: Vyacheslav Khizhnyakov
- Succeeded by: Viktor Goncharov

Personal details
- Born: 19 August 1957 (age 69) Stefanidinodar, Russian SFSR, Soviet Union

Viktor Petrovich Vodolatsky (Russian: Виктор Петрович Водолацкий; born 19 August 1957) is a Russian politician who is a member of the Federal Assembly, a Deputy of the State Duma of the V, VI, VII convocations. He is a member of the United Russia faction, a First Deputy Chairman of the State Duma Committee on CIS Affairs, Eurasian Integration and Relations with Compatriots, and a Chairman of the Supreme Council of SKVRiZ.

Vodolatsky is a member of the Presidential Council for Interethnic Relations, a member of the Presidential Council for Cossack Affairs. A Cossack general, he was chieftain of the Vsevelikoe Don Host Cossack society from 1999 to 2013.

== Biography ==
Viktor Vodolatsky was born on 10 August 1957 in the village of Stefanidinodar, Azovsky District, Rostov Oblast.

In 1974, he worked as a mechanic-repairman, a plumber. He had completed compulsory military service in the Soviet Army. He was a member of the Komsomol, and was a candidate member of the Communist Party of the Soviet Union. From 1985 to 1990, he worked at the enterprise of the united boiler houses in the city of Azov, Rostov Oblast, and worked his way up from a heating engineer to a director; then promoted Deputy General Director of the Rostovoblteplokommunenergo Association. In 1987, at the age of 30, he received a diploma from a civil engineering college in Rostov-on-Don.

=== In the Azov Administration ===
Since 1992, he was the First Deputy to the Mayor of Azov Vitaly Pevnev. Pevnev himself was appointed head of the Azov administration by a decree of the head of the Rostov Oblast Vladimir Chub in February 1992.

=== Azov City Duma ===
On 27 March 1994, local elections were held in Azov according to a new electoral system: in connection with the renaming of the Azov City Council of People's Deputies into the Azov City Duma, when the deputies of the new Duma were elected. The deputies were elected in 11 single-mandate constituencies. The executive and administrative body was the Azov administration. Viktor Vodolatsky was elected a member of parliament, deputy of the Azov City Duma of the first convocation. The head of local government, Pevnev chaired the meetings of the Duma and signed its decisions.

In 1995, he graduated from the psychological faculty of Rostov State University.

In the elections to the State Duma of the 2nd convocation, which took place on 17 December 1995, he ran for the Union of Cossacks on the list of the Our Home - Russia bloc, which included the Union of Cossacks. 10.13% of voters voted for the list of Our Home - Russia bloc, thus the bloc received 45 seats in the proportional system and 10 seats in majoritarian districts. Only the ataman of the Union of Cossacks, Aleksander Martynov, passed from the Union of Cossacks to the State Duma, and Vodolatsky was therefore not elected.

In 1996, he graduated from the Faculty of Economics of the Rostov State University.

In March 1997, his term as a member of the Azov City Duma expired.

=== Licensing Chamber of the Rostov Oblast ===
In October 1997, the Licensing Chamber of the Rostov Region "Rostoblllicense" was formed by the decision of Rostov Oblast Governor Chub. Vodolatsky was appointed the head of the newly created unit from 20 October October 1997.

In 1998, at Rostov University, he defended his thesis on the topic "Organizational structures of social and administrative management", receiving the degree of candidate of sociological sciences.

=== Deputy Governor of Rostov Oblast and Chieftain ===
In 1999, Vodolatsky became the Deputy Governor of the Rostov Oblast for Cossacks and Ecology.

In May 1999, the Council of Atamans of the Great Don Army appointed Cossack Colonel Gennady Nedvigin as temporary acting military chieftain of the Great Army of the Don Ataman of the Novocherkassk Cossack District. However, just a few days later, on 6 June 1999, Nedvigin was shot dead in the courtyard of his house. The Council of Atamans of the Great Don Army appointed Vodolatsky as a temporary ataman of the registered Cossacks on the Don.

In October 1999, the Novocherkassk Big Circle elected Yury Dyakov as its new chieftain and announced its support for Vodolatsky's candidacy for the post of Military chieftain. A week later, the Big Circle of the Great Don Army almost unanimously (minus two votes) elected Vodolatsky, who worked as Deputy Governor of the Rostov Oblast for Cossacks and Ecology, and ataman of the Great Don Army with a residence in Novocherkassk.

In 2002, he became the Head of the Representative Office of the Administration of the Rostov Oblast under the Government of Russia.

In 2003, he ran for the State Duma on the list of "United Russia", but was not elected.

In 2006, he graduated from the faculty of retraining and advanced training of the Military Academy of the General Staff of the Armed Forces of Russia.

=== Member of the State Duma ===
On 2 December 2007, Volodatsky was elected a member of parliament, a deputy of the State Duma of the fifth convocation as part of the federal list of candidates nominated by the All-Russian political party "United Russia". He was a member of the Security Committee, Chairman of the Subcommittee on Legislation in the Spheres of Crime Prevention, Ensuring the Participation of the Population and Public Organizations in Law Enforcement.

In 2011, at the Southern Federal University in Rostov-on-Don, he defended his dissertation on the topic "Cossacks in modern society", receiving a doctorate in sociological sciences.

From 6 June 6 to 12 November 2012, he was again the Deputy Governor of the Rostov Oblast.

On 12 November 2012, he became a member of the State Duma of the sixth convocation, having received a mandate from Aleksey Knyshov, who had laid down his parliamentary powers ahead of schedule.

On 18 September 2016, he was elected to the State Duma of the seventh convocation on the federal list from the United Russia party. He is a member of the public organization "Academy of Social Sciences". He is a member of the General Council of the United Russia party, a member of the Presidium of the Political Council of the Rostov regional branch of the United Russia party.

Vodolatsky had voted against referring the Volgograd Oblast to the 3rd time zone. He visited the territory of the self-proclaimed Luhansk People's Republic.

==== Legislative activity ====
From 2007 to 2021, during the term of office of a member of the State Duma of the 5th, 6th and 7th convocations, he co-authored 333 legislative initiatives and amendments to draft federal laws.

=== On questions of activities regarding Pyotr Krasnov ===
On 17 January 2008, Vodolatsky signed an order on the creation of a working group to analyze the activities of Pyotr Krasnov in connection with a request received from the organization "Cossack Abroad". On 18 January 2008, the Council of Atamans of the organization “The Great Don Host” made a decision, which noted: “... historical facts indicate that an active fighter against the Bolsheviks during the Civil War, writer and publicist P.N. Krasnov during the Great Patriotic War collaborated with Nazi Germany; <...> Attaching exceptional importance to the above, the Council of Atamans decided: to refuse the petition to the non-profit foundation “Cossack Abroad” in resolving the issue of the political rehabilitation of P. N. Krasnov ”. Vodolatsky himself said: "The fact of his cooperation with Hitler during the war makes the idea of his rehabilitation completely unacceptable for us." The initiative for rehabilitation was condemned by veterans of the Great Patriotic War and representatives of the Russian Orthodox Church.

=== Sanctions ===
He was sanctioned by the UK government in 2014 in relation to the Russo-Ukrainian War.

== Injury ==
According to multiple sources, he was injured by a Ukrainian HIMARS strike in Luhansk on 13 May 2023. A video of him emerged showing that he did not sustain serious injuries.

== Family ==
He is married, with two children, and four grandchildren.
