= Revision number Six =

Historical document

The Revision number Six (Russian: Редакция номер Шесть, romanized: Redaktsiya nomer Shest') is a historical document prepared by the Presidential Administration of Russia, provided by anonymous Administration employee to journalists, and published on 9 May 2000 in the newspaper Kommersant. This document contained a reform project of Presidential Administration of Russia aimed at transforming the Administration into the only centre for management of all political processes in Russia under the new president of Russia Vladimir Putin, whose realization was related to strengthening of the role of state secret services and transforming Russian Federation into counterintelligence state.

== Origin ==
The text of the document was provided to the newspaper Kommersant by employee of the Presidential Administration of Russia which identity was not revealed by journalists for safety reasons. Vladimir Putin was mentioned in the text of this document as acting president, and the attached charts, totalling more than 100 pages, mentioned the composition of factions existed prior to 1999 Russian legislative election, and these facts indicated that the work on this document started long before Boris Yeltsin resignation and 2000 Russian presidential election. The references, made in the text, allowed to suggest that this document was just part of a broader political programme of new president.

Before the text of the document, editor-in-chief wrote: "the fact that such program is being developed is very important in itself … if this will be a reality, almost the entire population of Russia – from politicians and governors to ordinary voters – will be under surveillance by secret services". This document was published again in 2010.

== Content ==
The authors of the document stated that Russian social and political system at the time was self-regulatory and self-administrated. It was totally unacceptable to Vladimir Putin who wished that all social and political processes in Russia and Commonwealth of Independent States would completely be managed by one single body. The newly established Domestic Policy Directorate of the Presidential Administration was supposed to be such body.

The authors of the document rejected the possibility of direct prohibition on opposition activities and independent mass media activities considering that Russian society was not ready for that. Therefore, they proposed the use of a combination of public and secret activities. Secret activities were to be carried out with the direct use of special services, in particular, Federal Security Service.

The public part of the activity of the Domestic Policy Directorate was to demonstrate that Directorate assists political parties, media and civil society institutions. The main objective of the secret part of the activity of the Domestic Policy Directorate was to take control over the activity of political parties, community and political leaders, governors, judges, legislatures, candidates for elective positions, election commissions and election officials, mass media and journalists.

The goals of the Domestic Policy Directorate:

Official goal	True goal
Assistance for the organization of elections	Providing necessary results of elections
Prevention of separatism	Strengthening of federal authorities and, namely, President of Russia
Prevention of extremism	Suppressing opposition to Vladimir Putin

To achieve main objective and goals, the following tasks were set:

1) creation of the informational and political barrier around Putin (good things happen thanks to Putin personally but bad officials are responsible for bad things and not Putin; Putin doesn't respond to opposition's charge and doesn't participate in debates – others do that for him);

2) collection of information (including dirt) about individuals and organizations of interests and put pressure on them;

3) discrediting the opposition;

4) creation of conditions under which independent mass media cannot operate and the creation of own media;

5) establishment of civil society organizations which are ostensibly independent but actually are under the full control of the Kremlin and suppression of independent civil society organizations;

6) organizing mass public events in support of Putin;

7) taking control over elections to ensure the victories of pro-Kremlin candidates;

8) creating and maintaining secret registers of political opposition leaders, civil society public figures, independent journalists;

9) widespread infiltration of agents of active reserve;

10) interference in political processes in Commonwealth of Independent States (CIS) countries.

== Analysis ==
According to Vasily Gatov, the analyst of Annenberg School for Communication and Journalism at the University of Southern California, the realizations of the provisions of the «Revision number Six» means building a state where democratic institutions exist nominally but in reality these institutions are fully controlled by Presidential Administration and secret police. He characterized such regime as «counterintelligence state» (one of the kinds of guided democracy).

On 7 May 2016, the newspaper Kommersant had published an article by Ilya Barabanov and Gleb Cherkasov containing an analysis of the implementation of provisions of the Revision number Six. They concluded that, although the authors of the Revision number Six had not taken into account some things (for example, authors of the aforementioned document denied the need for creation of pro-Kremlin political party, which actually was established subsequently), by and large, the provisions of the document were conducted.
