= Andrey Podavalov =

Russian politician

- Андрей Подавалов

Presidential Plenipotentiary Representative in the State Duma
- Acting
- In office 22 January 2009 – 12 February 2009
- President: Vladimir Putin
- Preceded by: Aleksandr Kosopkin
- Succeeded by: Garry Minkh

Personal details
- Born: Soviet Union

Andrey Aleksandrovich Podavalov (Russian: Андрей Александрович Подавалов) is a Russian politician who had been the acting Plenipotentiary Representative in the State Duma in 2009.

== Biography ==
He was the head of the Department for Ensuring the Activities of Plenipotentiary Representatives of the President of Russia in the Constitutional Court of Russia and the Chambers of the Federal Assembly of the Office of the President of the Russian for Internal Policy.

On 22 January 2009, Podavalov was appointed the acting Plenipotentiary Representative in the State Duma, 2 weeks after the former plenipotentiary representative, Aleskandr Kosopkin died in a plane crash on 9 January. He was officially replaced by Garry Minkh on 12 February.
