= Crimean Federal District =

Crimean Federal District: Крымский федеральный округ
- Federal district of Russia
- Location of the Crimea Federal District within Russia
- Country: Russia
- Established: 21 March 2014
- Incorporated into Southern Federal District: 28 July 2016
- Administrative center: Simferopol

Government
  - Presidential Envoy: Oleg Belaventsev

Area
  - Total: 26,889 km^{2} (10,382 sq mi)
  - Rank: 9th

Population (2014)
  - Total: 2,284,000 (Ethnicities): Russians: 67.90%; Ukrainians: 15.68%; Crimean Tatars: 10.57%; Tatars: 2.05%; Belarusians: 0.99%; Armenians: 0.50%; Azerbaijanis: 0.20%; Uzbeks: 0.16%; Moldovans: 0.14%; Jews: 0.14%; Koreans: 0.14%; Greeks: 0.13%; Poles: 0.13%; Romani: 0.11%; Chuvash: 0.09%; Bulgarians: 0.09%; Germans: 0.08%; Mordvins: 0.07%; Georgians: 0.07%; other groups: 0.76%
  - Rank: 9th
  - Density: 84.9/km^{2} (220/sq mi)
- Time zone: UTC+3 (Moscow Time)
- Federal subjects: Republic of Crimea Sevastopol
- Economic region: North Caucasus
- Website: kfo.gov.ru

The Crimean Federal District (Russian: Кры́мский федера́льный о́круг, romanized: Krymskiy federal'nyy okrug) was a federal district of Russia. It was established on 21 March 2014 after the Russian annexation of Crimea. The federal district included both the Republic of Crimea and the federal city of Sevastopol, both recognized as part of Ukraine by most of the international community. Ukraine considers the area, along with some other areas, as temporarily occupied territories.

Oleg Belaventsev was appointed the presidential envoy, and the administrative centre of the federal district was Simferopol.

On 28 July 2016, the Crimean Federal District, which during its existence was by far the smallest of Russia's federal districts, was abolished and merged into the Southern Federal District, in order to "increase the efficiency of the federal state bodies' work".

== Federal subjects ==
Crimean Federal District
#	Flag	Coat of Arms	Federal subject	Area in km^{2}	Population	Administrative centre	Map of Administrative Division
1	Crimea	border=no	Republic of Crimea	26,100	1,966,801	Simferopol	
2	Sevastopol	border=no	Sevastopol	900	379,200	Sevastopol	

== See also ==
- Ministry of Internal Affairs
