= Komlevo =

Komlevo Комлево
- Village
- Location within Vladimir Oblast Location within Russia
- Coordinates: 56°11′N 42°21′E
- Country: Russia
- Region: Vladimir Oblast
- District: Vyaznikovsky District
- Time zone: UTC+3:00

Komlevo (Russian: Комлево) is a rural locality (a village) in Gorod Vyazniki, Vyaznikovsky District, Vladimir Oblast, Russia. The population was 1 as of 2010.

== Geography ==
Komlevo is located 17 km southeast of Vyazniki (the district's administrative centre) by road. Kudryavtsevo is the nearest rural locality.
