= Alexander Granberg =

Russian economist (1936–2010)

- Александр Гранберг
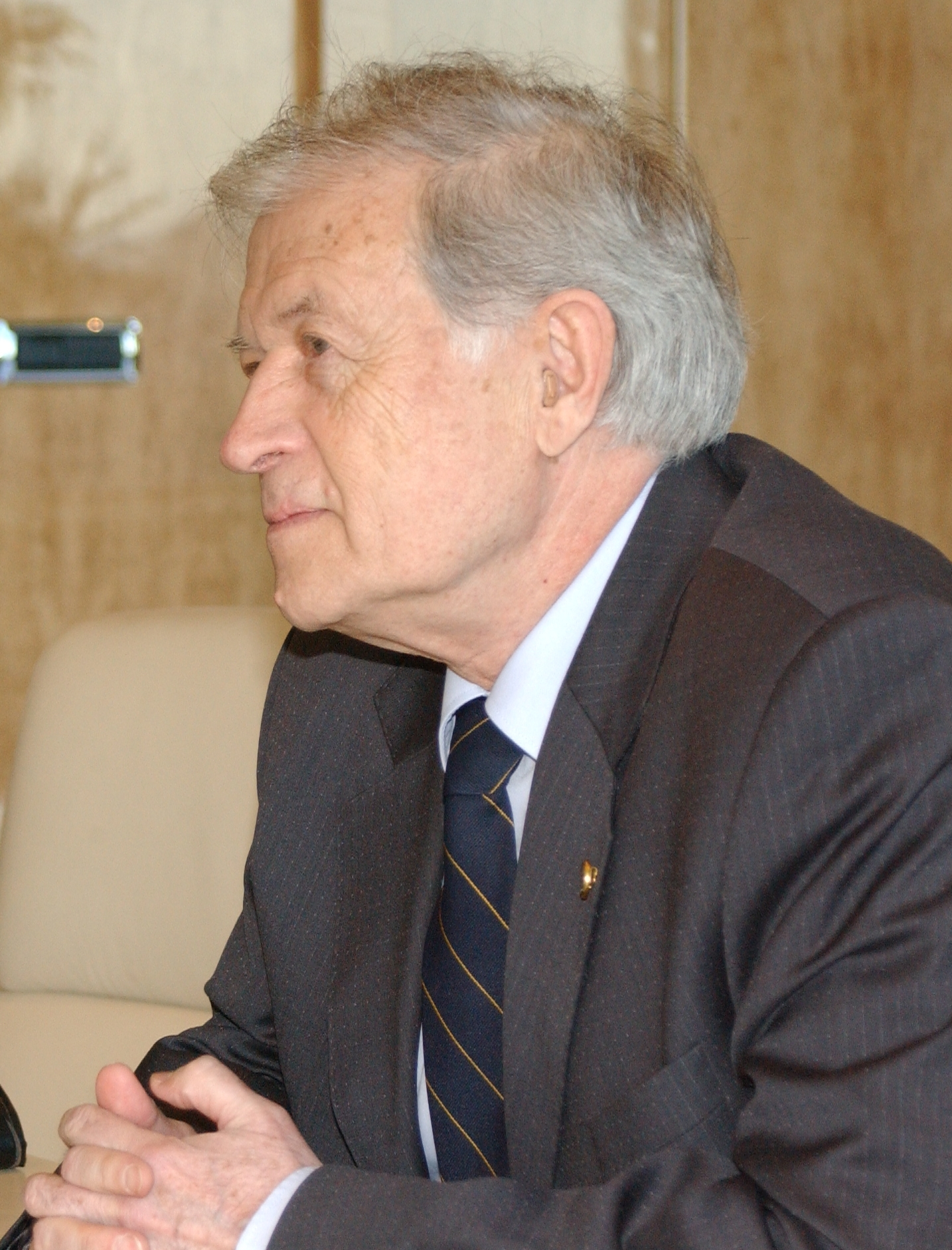
- Granberg in April 2007
- Born: 26 June 1936; Moscow, Soviet Union
- Died: 22 August 2010 (aged 74); Moscow, Russia
- Resting place: Donskoye Cemetery
- Occupation: Economist

Academic background
- Education: Moscow State University
- Awards: Order "For Merit to the Fatherland"; Order of Friendship; Order of the Badge of Honour; Medal "Defender of a Free Russia"; State Prize of the Russian Federation; Government Prize of Russia in Sphere of Science and Technology; Lenin Komsomol Prize; Certificate of Honor of the Government of the Russian Federation

Alexander Grigorievich Granberg (Russian: Александр Григорьевич Гранберг; 25 June 1936 – 22 August 2010) was a Soviet and Russian economist, specialist in the field of regional economics and interregional economic relations, mathematical modeling of economic processes and methodology of intersectoral analysis.

== Biography ==
Alexander Granberg was born in 1936 in Moscow.

In 1960, he graduated from the Moscow State Economic Institute.

He worked at the Computing Center of the State Economic Council of the Soviet Union and from 1963 to 1969 at the Novosibirsk State University. In 1969, he became an employee of the Institute of Economics and Industrial Engineering, where he held positions of the Head of Sector, the deputy director and Director (since 1985).

The Chairman of the United Scientific Council of the Economic Sciences of the SB RAS (1985–1992).

He was the editor-in-chief of the Economics and Industrial Engineering (1988–1990) and Regional Development and Cooperation.

In 1991, he moved to Moscow.

He was the People's Deputy (1990–1993) and an advisor to the President of Russia (1991–1993).

Corresponding member of the Academy for Spatial Research and Planning (Germany), Honorary Doctor of Economic Academy named after O. Lange (Poland) and full member of the New York Academy of Sciences, the president of the International Academy of Regional Development and Cooperation.

The member of the Presidium of the RAS and the Bureau of the Department of Social Sciences (since 2002).

He died on 22 August 2010.

== Scientific interests ==
His scientific interests were related to regional economic modeling, spatial economics, interregional economic cooperation, state regulation of regional development, intersectoral balance.

The scientist was the founder of the Russian school of spatial intersectoral research.

== Awards ==
He was awarded the Order of the Badge of Honour (1986) and Order of Friendship (1999).
