= Aleksandr Matovnikov =

Russian politician and lieutenant general

- Александр Матовников
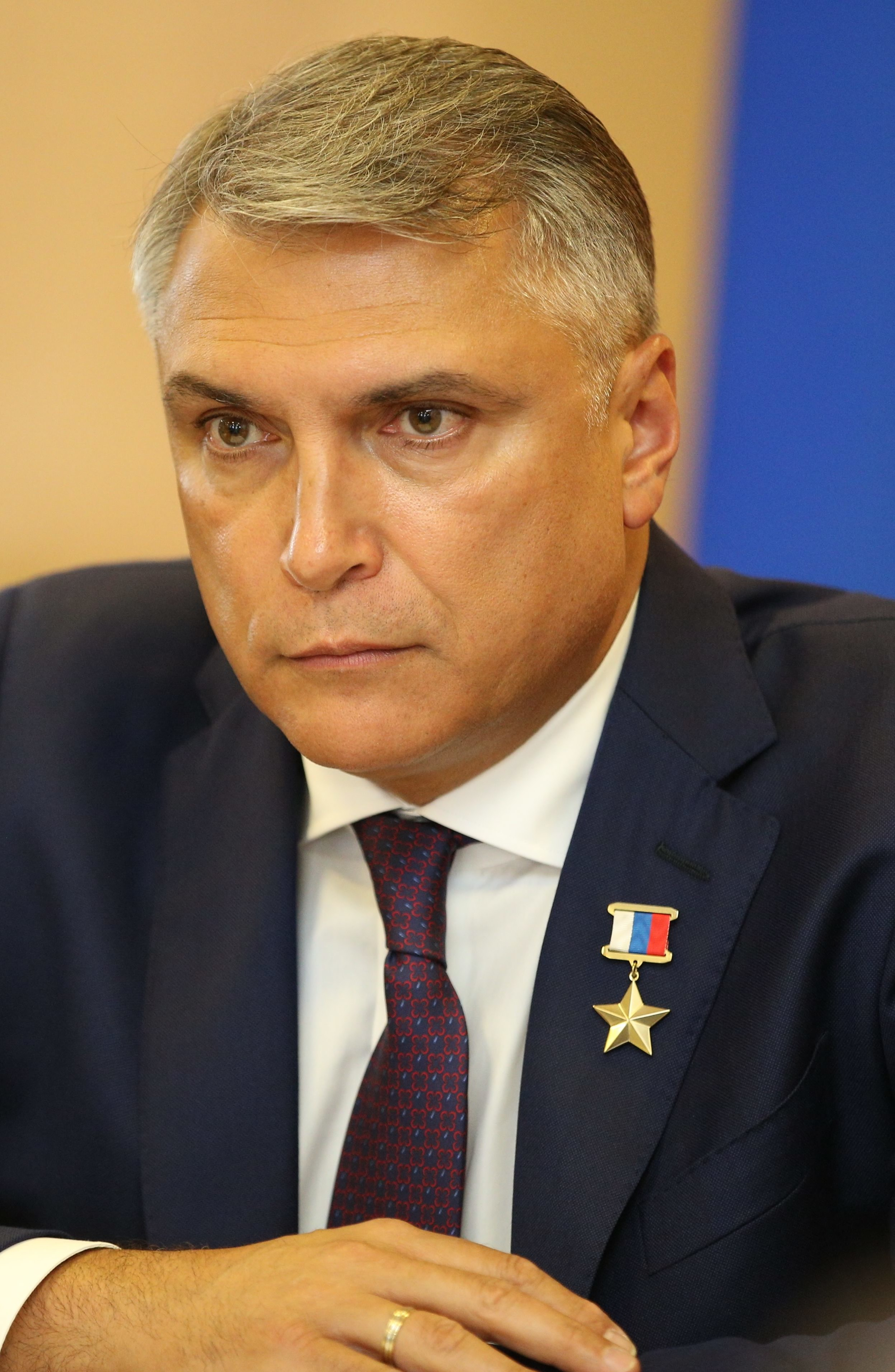
- Matovnikov in 2018

4th Presidential Envoy to the North Caucasus Federal District
- In office 26 June 2018 – 22 January 2020
- President: Vladimir Putin
- Preceded by: Oleg Belaventsev
- Succeeded by: Yury Chaika

Personal details
- Born: 19 September 1965 (age 61) Moscow, Russian SFSR, Soviet Union
- Education: FSB Academy

Military service
- Allegiance: Soviet Union; Russia
- Branch/service: Federal Security Service
- Rank: Lieutenant general
- Unit: Alpha Group
- Battles/wars: Soviet–Afghan War; First Chechen War; Budyonnovsk hospital hostage crisis; Second Chechen War; Moscow theater hostage crisis; Russo-Ukrainian War; Annexation of Crimea; Syrian Civil War
- Awards: Hero of the Russian Federation

Aleksandr Anatolyevich Matovnikov (Russian: Александр Анатольевич Матовников; born 19 September 1965) is a Russian politician and lieutenant general who is currently the Deputy Commander-in-Chief of the Ground Forces of the Russian Federation since 22 January 2020. He was awarded the title Hero of the Russian Federation in 2017. Matovnikov was previously the fourth Presidential Envoy to the North Caucasus Federal District, serving from 2018 to 2020.

In his military career, he was the Deputy Commander of the Special Operations Forces of the Main (Intelligence) Directorate of the General Staff of the Russian armed forces from 2013 to 2015, and Commander of the MTR and Deputy Head of the Main Directorate of the General Staff of the Russian Armed Forces 2015 to 2018.

Matovnikov was also a member of the Russian Security Council from 2018 to 2020.

== Biography ==
Aleksandr Matovnikov was born on 19 September 1965 in Moscow. His paternal grandfather took part in the Great Patriotic War as an artilleryman, and his maternal grandfather fought in the civil war in Turkestan, in the Great Patriotic War he commanded a division, participated in battles in Stalingrad and Bryansk.

His father, Anatoly Mikhailovich Matovnikov, was a military man, a staff member of the State Security Committee, who in the 1980s held the post of deputy head of the secretariat of the 7th KGB Directorate (external surveillance of Soviet and foreign citizens), which was subordinate to the Alpha Group. After the 1991 Soviet coup attempt, in the context of a possible assault on the Lubyanka Building, Matovnikov destroyed secret management documents, for which he was subsequently forced to retire by the new leadership.

In 1982, he entered the Higher Border Military-Political School of the KGB, and after graduation in 1986 he began to serve in the Alpha Group.

He served under the command of Major General Viktor Karpukhin, and according to a colleague of Colonel Yury Torshin, during the service they "looked with envy at the participants in the storming of Amin's palace - holders of military orders."

As part of a motorized group operating under the cover of operational units of the border troops, Matovnikov took part in the Soviet–Afghan War, where he solved specific tasks in the interests of the KGB, including intercepting a caravan with weapons and drugs in the border area with Turkmenistan and Tajikistan.

He held the positions of the head of the 2nd department of the 1st department of the Alpha Group and the first deputy head of the Alpha Group.

In 1987, Matovnikov took part in the protection of the General Secretary Mikhail Gorbachev, who came on a state visit to Washington DC. In 1988, he ensured the safety of British Prime Minister Margaret Thatcher during her visit to the areas of Armenia affected by the earthquake. In 1992, he graduated from the Higher School of the Ministry of Security of Russia.

Matovnikov took part in the First and Second Chechen Wars, in several special operations, including in the North Caucasus. He was one of the leaders of the responses to the Budyonnovsk hospital, and Moscow theater hostage crises. He further was part of an investigation into the circumstances of the Beslan school siege. In Chechen circles he had the nickname "Chekist".

After serving about 30 years in Alpha, in 2013, Matkovnikov was transferred to work in the Ministry of Defense, and then appointed to the post of Deputy Commander of the Special Operations Forces of the Main (Intelligence) Directorate of the General Staff of the Russian Armed Forces.

In 2015, after Alexey Dyumin left for the post of Deputy Defense Minister, Matovnikov became Commander of the MTR and Deputy Chief of the Main Directorate of the General Staff of the Russian Armed Forces.

According to media reports, Matovnikov was a special assignment officer under Russian President Vladimir Putin and was one of the leaders of secret military operations abroad, including in Ukraine, where he coordinated the actions of personnel during Russia's annexation of Crimea. He was also at the command posts he took part in the Russian intervention in the Syrian civil war.

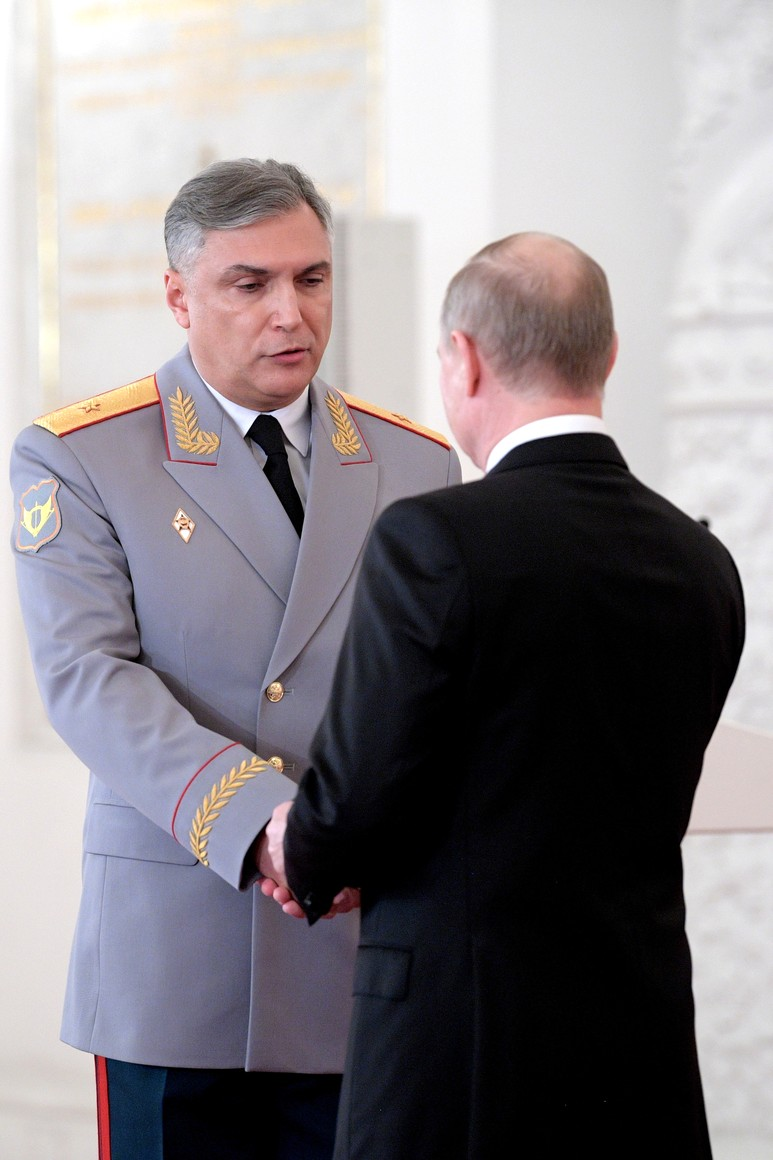
Vladimir Putin awards Matovnikov as a Hero of the Russian Federation, 2017

In 2017, in the rank of Major General by decree of Putin, Matovnikov was awarded the title Hero of the Russian Federation, in his own words, "for Syria." Due to the closed nature of the service, he first appeared in public and in front of cameras only during the award ceremony, despite the fact that the names of most of the Syrian "Heroes of Russia" are classified.

On 22 February 2018, Matovnikov he was promoted to Lieutenant General.

On 26 June 2018, Matvonikov was appointed Presidential Envoy to the North Caucasus Federal District, replacing Oleg Belaventsev. This decision was supported by the leadership of the North Caucasus Federal District, including the heads of Chechnya, Ramzan Kadyrov, Karachay-Cherkessia, Rashid Temrezov, Ingushetia, Yunus-Bek Yevkurov, North Ossetia Vyacheslav Bitarov, and Governor of Stavropol Krai, Vladimir Vladimorov. On 28 June 2018, in Pyatigorsk, Belaventsev introduced Matovnikov to the heads of the subjects, representatives of the clergy, law enforcement agencies, and the staff of the embassy..

Here you need to work well, live well, and, of course, do not forget about national security in February 2018 I was awarded the rank of lieutenant general.

— Matovnikov as Plenipotentiary Envoy

On 3 July 2018, Matovnikov was included in the Russian Security Council.

From 2018 to 2019, Matovnikov took part in resolving the situation with the territorial dispute between Chechnya and Ingushetia and the protests that arose in this regard.

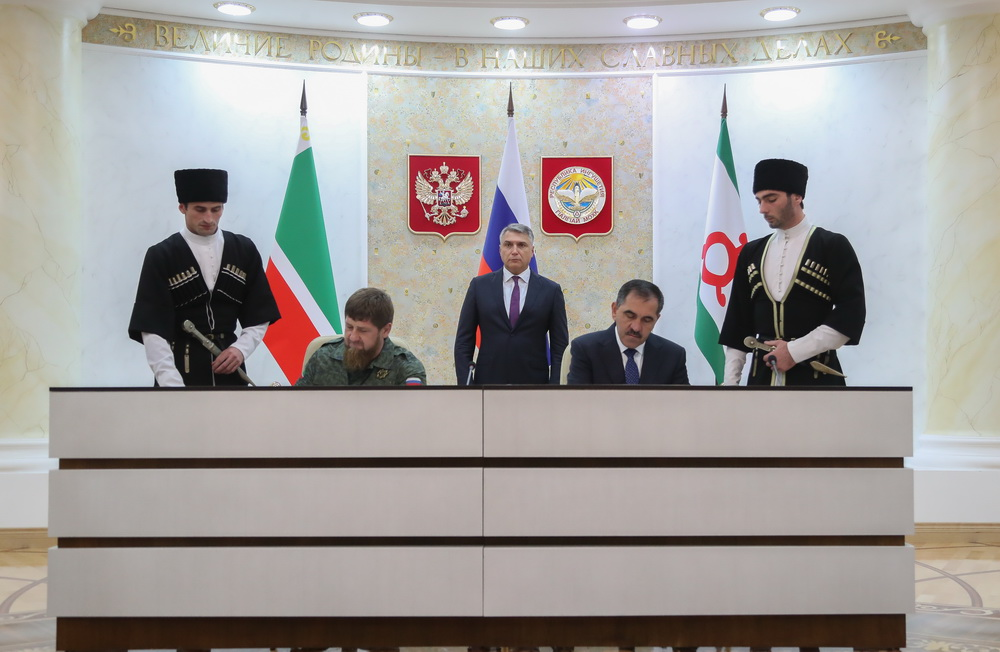
Matovnikov (center) with Ramzan Kadyrov & Yunus-Bek Yevkurov in September 2018

In 2019, together with the director of the Russian National Guard, Viktor Zolotov, he submitted documents on the criminal activities of a member of the Federation Council Rauf Arashukov for Putin's consideration, after which he was arrested.

On 22 January 2020, Putin appointed former Prosecutor General Yury Chaika to the post of plenipotentiary in the North Caucasus Federal District, on the same day Matovnikov was transferred to the post of Deputy Commander-in-Chief of the Ground Forces of the Russia to replace Colonel General Aleksander Lentsov. On 3 February, he was removed from the Security Council.

== Personal life ==
Until recently, data on Matovnikov's personal life was not freely available. He is currently married to Svetlana since 2005. They have children containing a daughter, Aleksandra (born in 2006), and a son, Aleksey (born in 2009). His first wife, Olga divorced in 1996. The daughter from her first marriage is Anna (born in 1995).

He is on good terms with the leaders of the regions of the North Caucasus Federal District. Since 1999, for work, he was assigned to the family of Kadyrov's father, Akhmat, and lived in his house. He is friends with Ramzan, and make visits to him.

He is a member of the Association of Veterans of Alpha Anti-Terror Unit, conducts active military-patriotic work. He is fond of mountain skiing, football, and horse riding.

=== Income ===
According to the data posted in the declaration containing information on income, expenses, property and property obligations of persons holding government positions in Russia, in 2018 Matovnikov earned 7,710,163 rubles. His wife's income for the same period was 279,840 rubles. Matovnikov owns a land plot with an area of 478 sq. meters, residential building with an area of 302.7 sq. m. and a non-residential building - 95 square meters. Matovnikov's wife owns two apartments with an area of 38.1 and 104.7 square meters.

== See also ==
- List of Heroes of the Russian Federation

Military offices
Preceded by Aleksey Dyumin	Commander of the Special Operations Forces; 2015–2018	Succeeded by Valery Flyustikov
Preceded by Alexander Lentsov	Deputy Commander-in-Chief of the Russian Ground Forces; 2020–present	Incumbent
