= Anatoly Sliva =

Russian politician

- Анатолий Слива

Judge of the Constitutional Court of Russia
- In office 14 October 1998 – 18 March 2010
- Nominated by: Boris Yeltsin

Presidential Plenipotentiary Representative to the Federation Council
- In office 10 February 1996 – 27 October 1998
- President: Boris Yeltsin
- Preceded by: Office established
- Succeeded by: Yury Yarov

Member of the State Duma
- In office 11 January 1994 – 10 February 1996

Personal details
- Born: Anatoly Yakovlyevich Sliva; 10 February 1940 (age 86) Propoysk, Byelorussian SSR, Soviet Union
- Party: Party of Russian Unity and Accord
- Education: Moscow State University
- Awards: Order "For Merit to the Fatherland", 4th Class

Anatoly Yakovlyevich Sliva (Russian: Анатолий Яковлевич Слива; born 10 February 1940) is a Belarusian-born Russian jurist and politician who was the judge of the Constitutional Court of Russia from 1998 to 2010. He was also the Plenipotentiary Representative of the President of Russia to the Federation Council from 1996 to 1998. He has the federal state civilian service rank of 1st class Active State Councillor of the Russian Federation.

== Biography ==
Anatoly Sliva was born in Propoysk (present day Slawharad), Belarus, on 10 February 1940. In 1967, he graduated from the Faculty of Law of Lomonosov Moscow State University.

On 13 February 1992, he was appointed deputy head of the State Legal Department of the President of Russian, as the Head of the Department for Interaction with Representative and Executive Authorities and National Policy. From 22 March 1992 to 31 March 1993, he was the Acting Head of the State Legal Department of the President of Russia.

Between 1993 and 1996, Sliva was a member of the State Duma and was the Chairman of the State Duma Committee on Local Self-Government. On 4 January 1994, he was relieved of his post as Deputy Head of the State Legal Department of the President of Russia, and the Head of the department in connection with his election as a member of the State Duma.

On 10 February 1996, Sliva became the Plenipotentiary Representative of the President of Russia to the Federation Council. On 14 October 1998, Sliva was appointed a judge of the Constitutional Court of Russia. He resigned from the court on 18 March 2010.
