= Alexander Kotenkov =

Aleksandr Kotenkov
- Александр Котенков
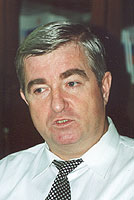
- Kotenkov in 2002

Presidential Plenipotentiary Representative in the Federation Council
- In office 5 April 2004 – 29 October 2013
- President: Vladimir Putin
- Preceded by: Yury Yarov
- Succeeded by: Artur Muravyov

Presidential Plenipotentiary Representative in the State Duma
- In office 10 February 1996 – 5 April 2004
- President: Boris Yeltsin; Vladimir Putin
- Preceded by: Office established
- Succeeded by: Aleksandr Kosopkin

Head of the Presidential State Legal Department
- In office 22 May 1992 – 10 February 1996
- President: Boris Yeltsin
- Preceded by: Sergey Shakhray
- Succeeded by: Ruslan Orekhov

Personal details
- Born: 23 September 1952 (age 73) Bely, Leningradsky District, Krasnodar Krai, RSFSR, USSR

Alexander Alexeyevich Kotenkov (Russian: Александр Алексеевич Котенков; born September 23, 1952) is a former plenipotentiary representative of the President of the Russian Federation, the Federation Council, former plenipotentiary representative of the President of the Russian Federation in the State Duma, a former member of the Federal Council of the Party of Russian Unity and Accord (PRES). He has the federal state civilian service rank of 1st class Active State Councillor of the Russian Federation.

Born in Krasnodar region in a working-class family.

Master of Sports, a multiple champion of the USSR and Russia in sailing (1971, 1973, 2000, 2001). Member of the Executive Committee of the Russian Olympic Committee. From 2000 to 2008 — President of the Russian Yachting Federation.
