= Artur Muravyov =

Russian politician

- Артур Муравьёв
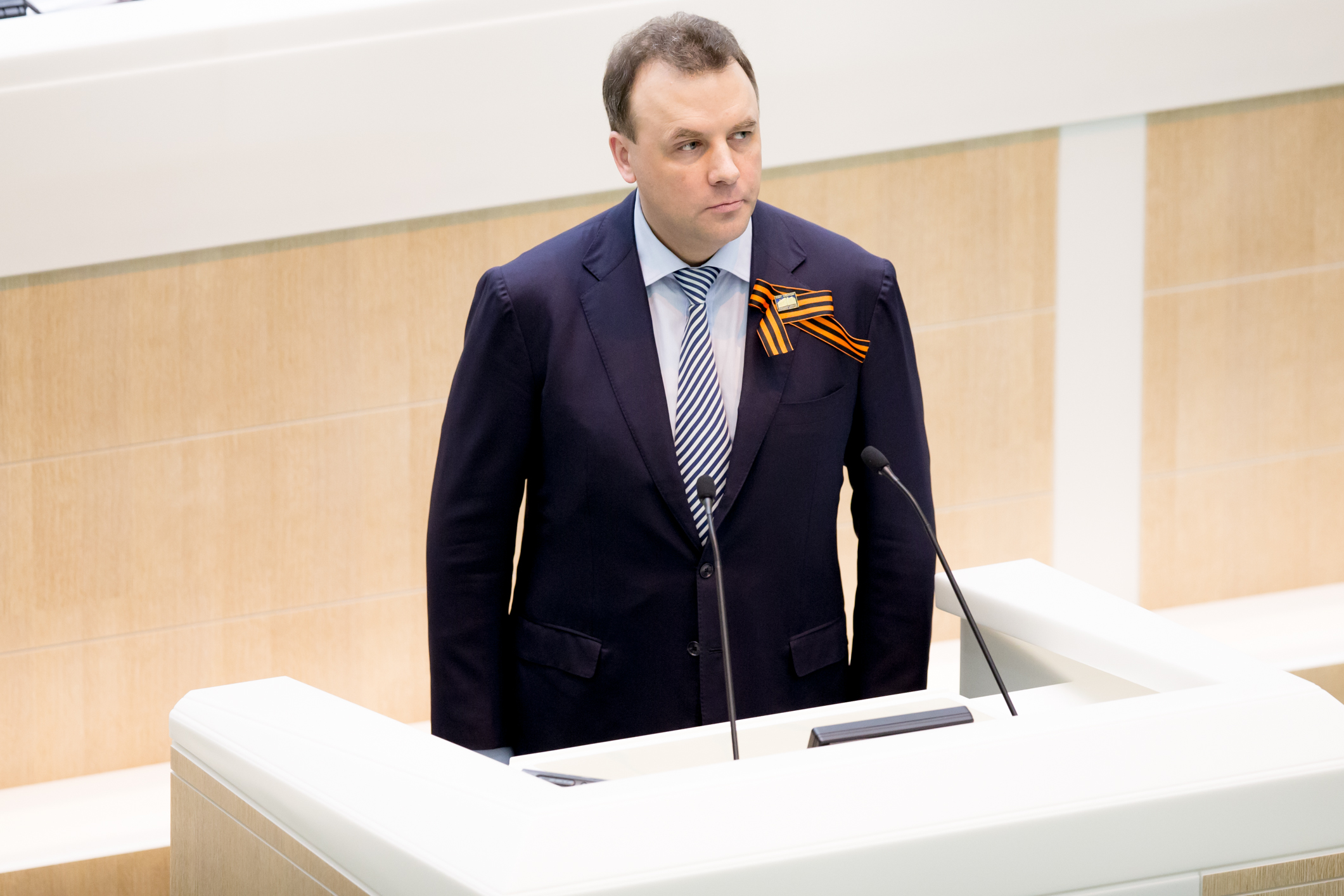
- Muravyov in 2015

Presidential Plenipotentiary Representative in the Federation Council
- Incumbent
- Assumed office 29 October 2013
- President: Vladimir Putin
- Preceded by: Alexander Kotenkov

Member of the State Duma
- In office 11 January 1994 – 22 December 1995

Personal details
- Born: 5 February 1965 (age 61) Klin, Moscow Oblast, Russian SFSR, Soviet Union

Artur Alekseyevich Muravyov (Russian: Артур Алексеевич Муравьёв; born on 5 February 1965) is a Russian statesman and politician, who is currently the 5th Plenipotentiary Representative of the president of Russia in the Federation Council since 29 October 2013.

He has the federal state civilian service rank of 1st class Active State Councillor of the Russian Federation.

== Biography ==
Artur Muravyov was born on 5 February 1965.

From 1993 to 1996, Muravyov had been a member of parliament, a deputy of the State Duma.

From 1998 to 1999, he was the first First Deputy Chairman of the State Committee for Reserves of Russia. From 2001 to 2002, he was the Deputy Head of the Directorate of the Main Directorate of Internal Policy of the President of Russia. From 2002 to 2012, he was the Deputy Head of the State Legal Directorate of the President of Russia. From 2012 too 2013, he was the Deputy Head of the Office of the President of Russia for Work with Appeals from Citizens and Organizations.

On 29 October 2013, Maravyov became the 5th Plenipotentiary Representative in the Federation Council.

== Family ==
He is married and has a daughter.
