= Oleg Belaventsev =

Russian military figure and statesman (born 1949)

Vice Admiral Oleg Belaventsev
- Олег Белавенцев
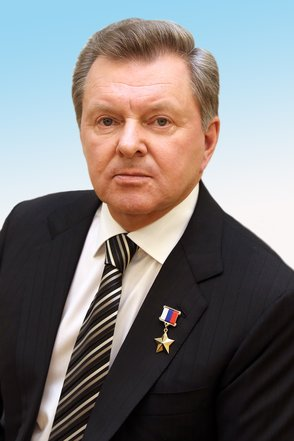
- Official portrait, 2016

Presidential Envoy to the North Caucasian Federal District
- In office 28 July 2016 – 26 June 2018
- President: Vladimir Putin
- Preceded by: Sergey Melikov
- Succeeded by: Aleksandr Matovnikov

Presidential Envoy to the Crimean Federal District
- In office 21 March 2014 – 28 July 2016
- President: Vladimir Putin
- Preceded by: Office created
- Succeeded by: Office abolished

Personal details
- Born: 15 September 1949 (age 76) Moscow, Russian SFSR, USSR
- Party: Independent
- Education: Sevastopol Naval School
- Profession: Military officer, diplomat

Military service
- Allegiance: Soviet Union (1971–1991); Russia (1991–present)
- Branch/service: Soviet Navy; Russian Navy
- Years of service: 1971–present
- Rank: Vice admiral

Oleg Yevgenyvich Belaventsev (Russian: Олег Евгеньевич Белавенцев; born 15 September 1949) is a Russian military figure and statesman. He has the military rank of Vice-admiral and the federal state civilian service rank of 1st class Active State Councillor of the Russian Federation.

== Biography ==
Belaventsev served as an officer in the Russian Navy, rising to the rank of vice-admiral. He was the third Secretary for Science and Technology at the Soviet embassy in London. On 24 April 1985 Belaventsev was among six Soviet diplomats deported from the United Kingdom on suspicion of spying. Following the dissolution of the Soviet Union, Belaventsev became deputy director of Rosvooruzhenie, Russia's primary arms trading agency.

From 2001 to 2012, Belaventsev was director of EMERCOM, a Russian state agency that manages the humanitarian efforts of the Ministry of Emergency Situations. He served under Minister of Emergency Situations Sergey Shoygu. (Note: The Russian Rescue Corps was established on 27 December 1990 and later became the Emergency And Civil Defense State Committee (GKCHS committee) with Sergey Shoygu appointed as its head in April 1991. In November 1991, the Russian Rescue Corps became the command for the civil defence forces and EMERCOM was established. On 10 January 1994, Russian Federation Ministry for Civil Defence, Emergencies and Disaster Relief, became EMERCOM. Since 2001, EMERCOM has had control of the Russian State Fire Service.) During his tenure, Belaventsev founded private companies that were awarded ministry contracts to implement international humanitarian projects. According to the Organized Crime and Corruption Reporting Project, Belaventsev's companies received hundreds of millions in state contracts from the government agencies where he was employed. Belaventsev owns a 60% stake in Zarubezhtehcomproekt (ZTPP); others with 10% stakes include current EMERCOM director Alexander Mordovskiy, EMERCOM accountant Tamara Mikhailova, and Sergey Ivanov, who was Belaventsev first deputy at EMERCOM.

In 2012, Belaventsev followed Shoygu to Moscow, where he led the General Affairs Department of the Moscow Region Governor and Moscow Region Government. After Shoygu was named Minister of Defense, Belaventsev became general director of Slavyanka, among the largest ministry-controlled companies. Crimean officials reported that Shoygu advised Vladimir Putin to appoint Belaventsev as his envoy to Crimea.

On 21 March 2014, Belaventsev was appointed Presidential envoy (Plenipotentiary Representative of the President of the Russian Federation to a Federal District) of the newly created Crimean Federal District. His appointment coincided with the formation of the new federal district. Belaventsev is considered politically close to the Russian Defense Minister Sergey Shoygu.

On 28 July 2016, the Crimean Federal District was abolished and merged into the Southern Federal District in order to "improve the governance". On the same day, Belaventsev was appointed the presidential envoy in North Caucasian Federal District. On 26 June 2018, he was replaced by Aleksandr Matovnikov.

=== Sanctions ===
He was sanctioned by the UK government in 2014 in relation to the Russo-Ukrainian War.

He was soon added to the lists of people sanctioned by the European Union and United States for the Russian invasion of Crimea.

== See also ==
- List of Heroes of the Russian Federation
