= Aleksandr Kosopkin =

Russian statesman

- Александр Косопкин
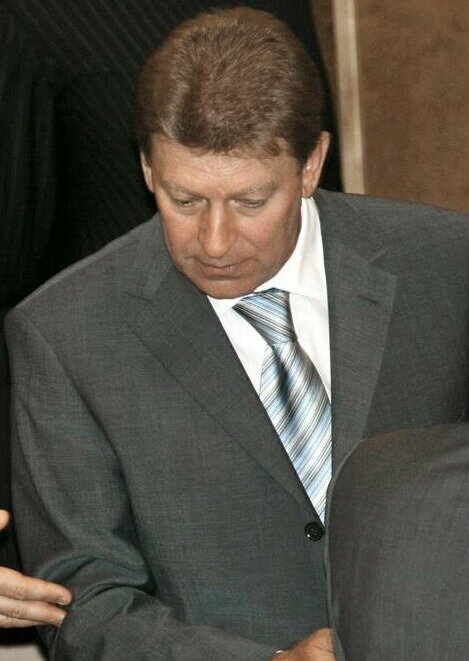
- Kosopkin in 2007

Presidential Plenipotentiary Representative in the State Duma
- In office 5 April 2004 – 9 January 2009
- President: Vladimir Putin
- Preceded by: Alexander Kotenkov
- Succeeded by: Andrey Podavalov (acting)

Personal details
- Born: Aleksandr Sergeyevich Kosopkin; 1 June 1957 Chita, Russia Soviet Union
- Died: 9 January 2009 (aged 51) Chornaya, Russia

Aleksandr Sergeyevich Kosopkin (Russian: Александр Сергеевич Косопкин; 1 June 1957 – 9 January 2009) was a Russian statesman who had served as the Plenipotentiary Representative in the State Duma. He had the federal state civilian service rank of 1st class Active State Councillor of the Russian Federation.

He was a candidate of psychological sciences.

== Biography ==
Aleksandr Kosopkin was born on 1 June 1957.

In 1976, he graduated from the Chelyabinsk Railway Technical School.

From 1976 to 1978, he served in the urgent service in the Soviet Army.

From 1978 to 1980, he was the driver's assistant, driver of the locomotive depot of the city of Zlatoust of the South Ural railway.

In 1990, Kosopkin was elected as the People's Deputy of the RSFSR in the Zlatoust Territorial District No. 751.

Between 1990 and 1993, he was the Chairman of the Subcommittee of the Commission on Social Policy of the Supreme Soviet of the Russian Federation. He was a member of the deputy associations "Democratic Russia", "Workers' Union of Russia", and "Chernobyl".

On 12 December 1991, as a member of the Supreme Soviet of the RSFSR, Kosopkin voted for the ratification of the Belovezhskaya agreement on the termination of the existence of the Soviet Union.

From 1993 to 1994, he was the Leading Specialist of the Department of Information Technology Support of the Office of the Federal Assembly of Russia.

In 1994, he had started working in the Administration of the President of Russia, under Boris Yeltsin.

From 1994 to 1996, he was a consultant, and team leader.

In 1996, he graduated from the Moscow State Law Academy. He was awarded with PhD in Psychology.

From 1996 to 2000, he was the Deputy Head of Department, then the Head of the Department for Interaction with Deputies of the State Duma and Members of the Federation Council of the Office of the President of Russia on Domestic Policy.

From 2000 to 2001, he was the Deputy Head of the Main Directorate, the Head of the Directorate for Interaction with the Federal Assembly, with political parties and movements of the Main Directorate of Internal Policy of the President of Russia.

From March 2001 to 2004, he had become the Head of the Main Department of Internal Policy of the President of Russia.

On 5 April 2004, Kosopkin had served as the Plenipotentiary Representative in the State Duma. He played an important role in the creation of the United Russia party and in the holding of the 2003 elections, after which the United Russia party won a constitutional majority.

=== Death ===
Aleksandr Sergeyevich Kosopkin died on 9 January 2009 in a helicopter crash. The Mi-171 helicopter (modification of the Mi-8), on which Kosopkin flew on an illegal hunt for argali listed in the IUCN Red List, disappeared in the mountains of the Altai Republic. On 11 January 2009, the Mi-171 was found in a destroyed state near Mount Chernoy. Of the eleven on board, seven people died, including Kosopkin.

He was buried on 14 January 2009, in the village of Komlevo, Ruzsky District, Moscow Oblast, at a church cemetery.

In 2010, the Investigative Committee under the Prosecutor's Office of Russia indicted the surviving passengers of this helicopter for illegal hunting. Two of them - the former deputy chairman of the government of the Altai Republic, Anatoly Bannykh and the deputy director of the Institute of Economics and Legislation of the city of Moscow, Nikolay Kapranov - were put on the federal wanted list.

== Honors ==
He was the Acting State Councilor of the Russian Federation, 1st class.

== Family ==
He was married, and had a son and a daughter.
