= Don State Technical University =

University in Russia

- Донской государственный технический университет
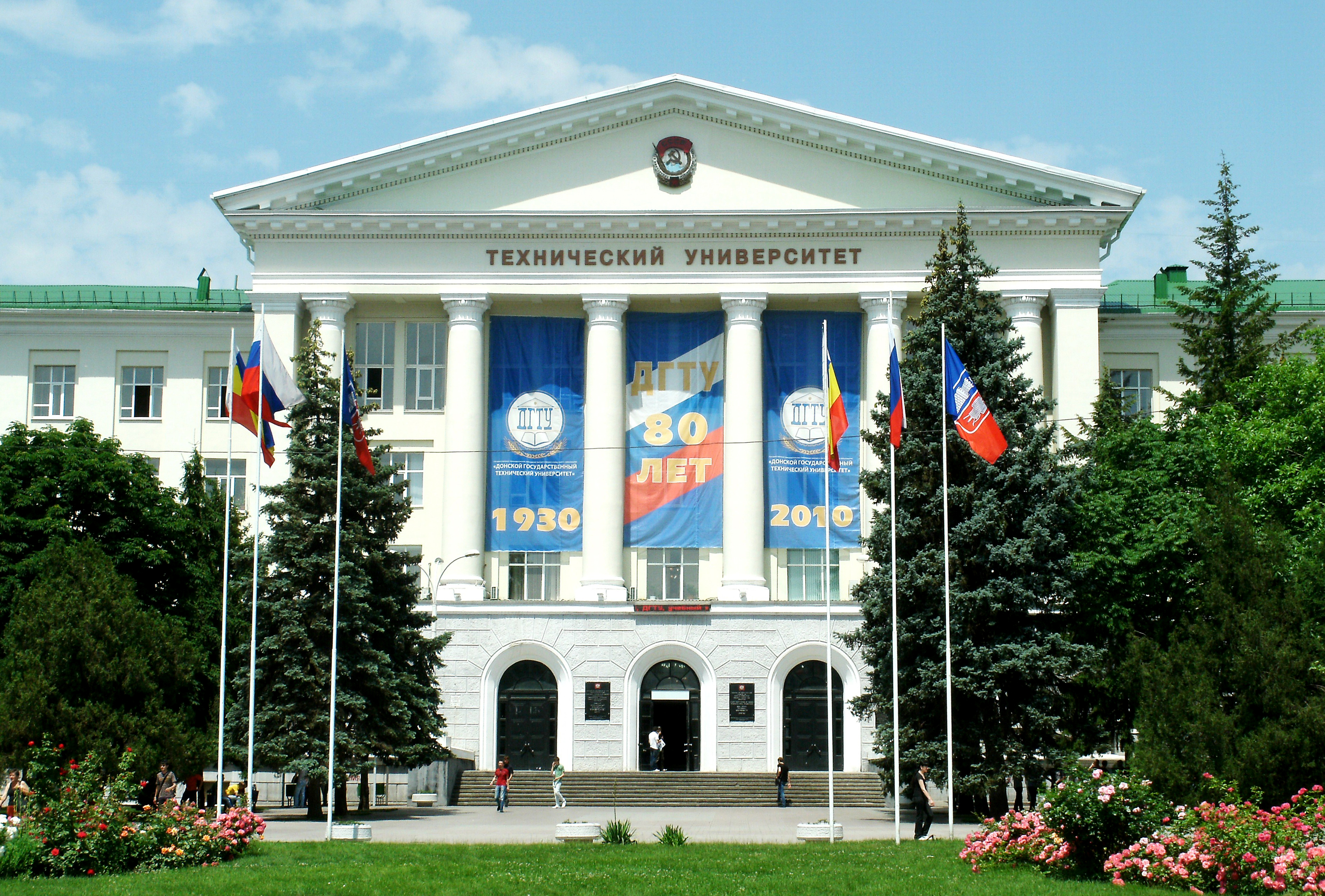
- Type: Public
- Established: 1930
- Location: Rostov-on-Don, Russia; 47°14′14″N 39°42′44″E
- Website: donstu.ru

University rankings

Global – Overall
- QS World: 1401 (2024)

Regional – Overall
- QS Emerging Europe and Central Asia: 301-350 (2022)

Don State Technical University (Russian: Донской государственный технический университет; Donskoi gosudarstvenny tehnicheski universitet) is a university in Rostov-on-Don, Russia.

== History ==
Don State Technical University was established on 20 May 1930. It was originally named the North Caucasus Institute of Agricultural Engineering and had two faculties namely, agricultural engineering and metalworking. In 1938 the institute was renamed as the Institute of Agricultural Engineering. In 1937, the university began its cooperation with the Russian agricultural equipment company, Rostselmash, and developed the combine harvester "Stalinets-1", which was represented at Exposition Internationale des Arts et Techniques dans la Vie Moderne in Paris, France. In 1940, there were 21 departments and 14 degree programs. In 1941, the institute as well as Rostselmash were evacuated to Tashkent, Uzbekistan. Many buildings of the institute were destroyed by German bombs in World War II. Teaching began again in August 1943. In the late 1940s they began redevelopment to combine harvesters for maize and sunflowers based upon Stalinets.

== Today ==
By 24 December 1992, the Institute of Agricultural Engineering Institute had grown to 16 faculties and changed its status from Institute to University. The University has expanded to include regional branches located in Volgodonsk, Taganrog, Azov and Yessentuki. As of 2012, the Bologna Process was implemented to comply with regional degree accreditations.
