= Yury Yarov =

Russian politician (born 1942)

- Юрий Яров
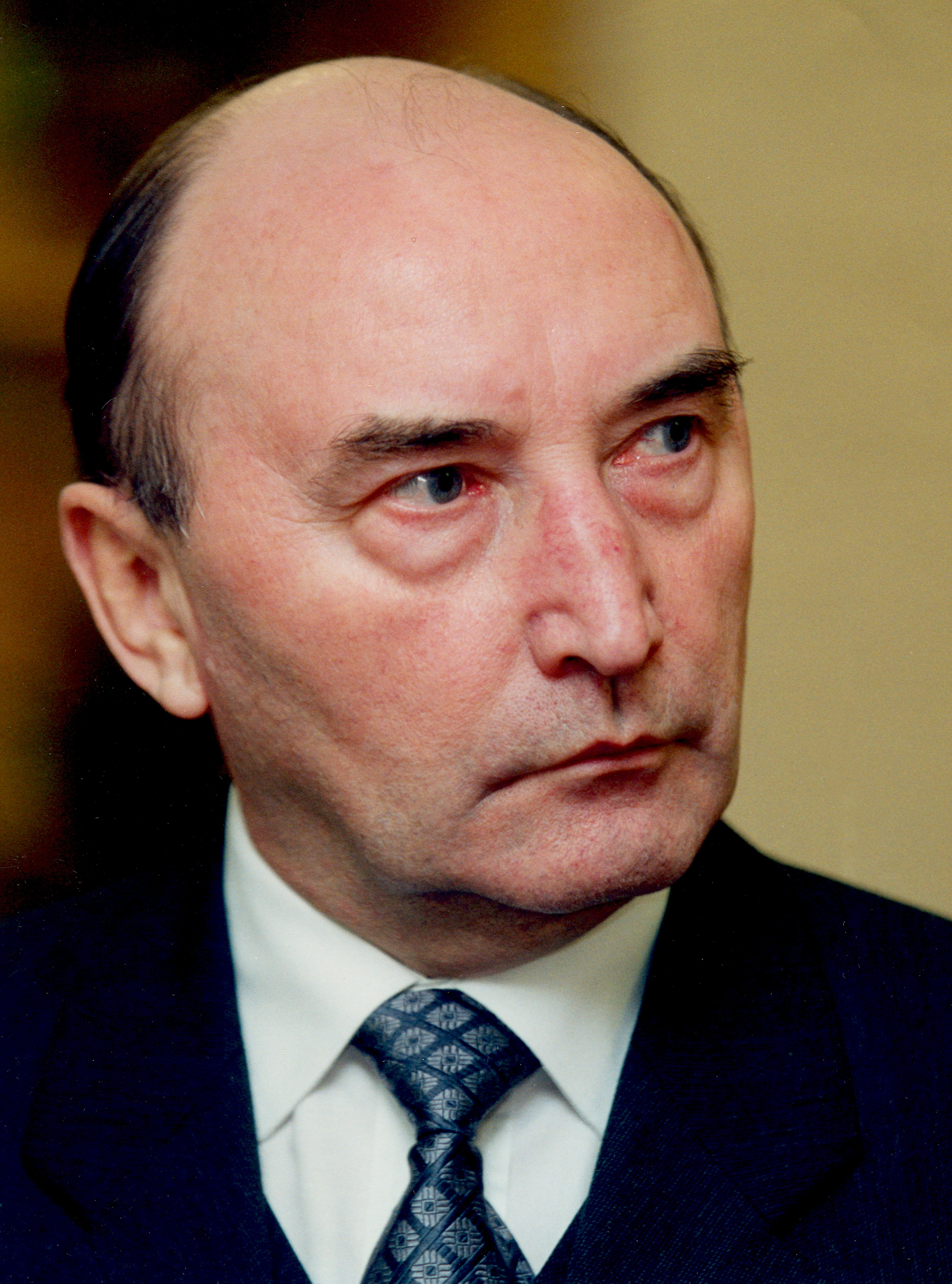
- Yarov in 2011

CIS Executive Secretary
- In office 2 April 1999 – 14 July 2004
- Preceded by: Ivan Korotchenya (acting)
- Succeeded by: Vladimir Rushailo

Presidential Plenipotentiary Representative in the Federation Council
- In office 7 December 1998 – 13 April 1999
- President: Boris Yeltsin
- Preceded by: Anatoly Sliva
- Succeeded by: Vyacheslav Khizhnyakov

Deputy Prime Minister of Russia
- In office 23 December 1992 – 24 June 1996
- Preceded by: Valery Makharadze
- Succeeded by: Viktor Ilyushin

Personal details
- Born: 2 April 1942 (age 84) Mariinsk, Russian SFSR, Soviet Union

Yury Fyodorovich Yarov (Russian: Юрий Фёдорович Яров; born 2 April 1942) is a Russian politician who was a Deputy Prime Minister of Russia from 1992 until 1996. Previously he was the 4th Executive Secretary of the Commonwealth of Independent States from 6 November 1999 to 14 July 2004. He has the federal state civilian service rank of 1st class Active State Councillor of the Russian Federation.

Yarov also played an important role in the leadership of Yeltsin's reelection campaign.

== Honours and awards ==
- Order of Merit for the Fatherland 4th class
- Order of Honour
- Order of Friendship
- Order of the Red Banner of Labour
- Order of the Badge of Honour
- Medal Defender of a Free Russia
- Jubilee Medal "300 Years of the Russian Navy"
- Medal "In Commemoration of the 300th Anniversary of Saint Petersburg"
- Jubilee Medal "In Commemoration of the 100th Anniversary since the Birth of Vladimir Il'ich Lenin"
- Order of Prince Yaroslav the Wise (Ukraine)

Political offices
Preceded by Anatoly Sliva	Russian President's Envoy to the Federation Council of Russia; December 7, 1998 – April 13, 1999	Succeeded by Vyacheslav Khizhnyakov
Preceded by Ivan Korotchenya (acting)	Executive Secretary of CIS; April 2, 1999 – June 14, 2004	Succeeded by Vladimir Rushailo
