= Federation Council (Russia) =

Upper house of the Federal Assembly of Russia

Federation Council Совет Федерации Sovet Federatsii
- List of members

Type
- Type: Upper house of the Federal Assembly of Russia

History
- Founded: 12 December 1993; 32 years ago
- Preceded by: Soviet of Nationalities; Constitutional Conference of Russia

Leadership
- Chairwoman: Valentina Matviyenko, United Russia since 21 September 2011
- First Deputy Chairman: Vladimir Yakushev, United Russia since 25 September 2024
- First Deputy Chairman: Andrey Yatskin, United Russia since 23 September 2020

Structure
- Seats: 178 (Note: The federal subjects of Russia include several not internationally recognized as part of Russia. The Republic of Crimea and Sevastopol were annexed in 2014, and Donetsk People's Republic, Luhansk People's Republic, Zaporizhzhia Oblast and Kherson Oblast in 2022.)
- Political groups: Non-partisan (de facto affiliations): United Russia (136); LDPR (3); CPRF (2); A Just Russia (1); Independent (34); Vacant seats (2)
- Committees: 10
- Length of term: Varies (tied to the appointing regional body)

Elections
- Voting system: Indirect election
- Last election: 12 December 1993 (Formation process changed since December 1995, abolishing direct elections)

Meeting place
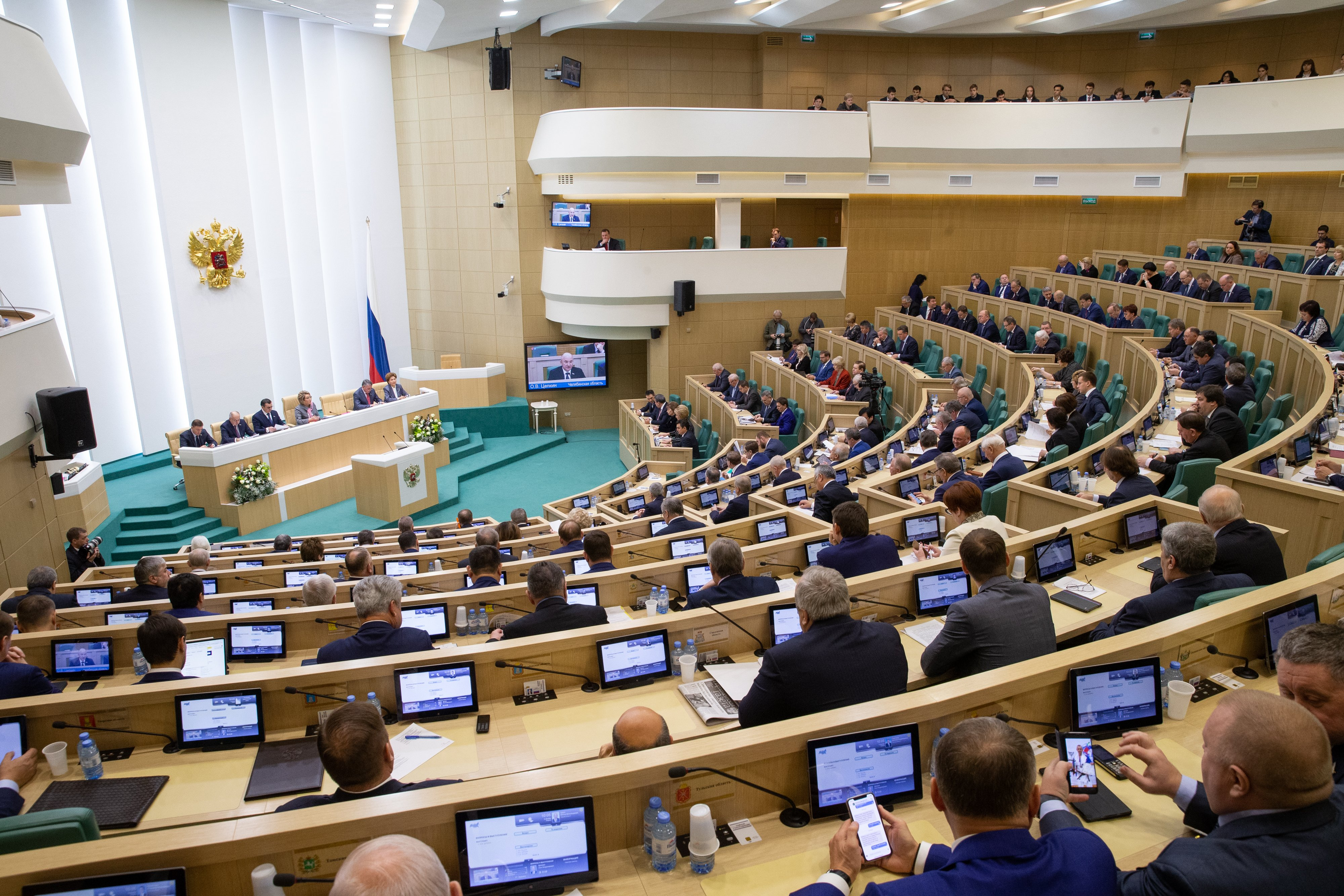
- 26 Bolshaya Dmitrovka, Moscow

Website
- council.gov.ru/en/

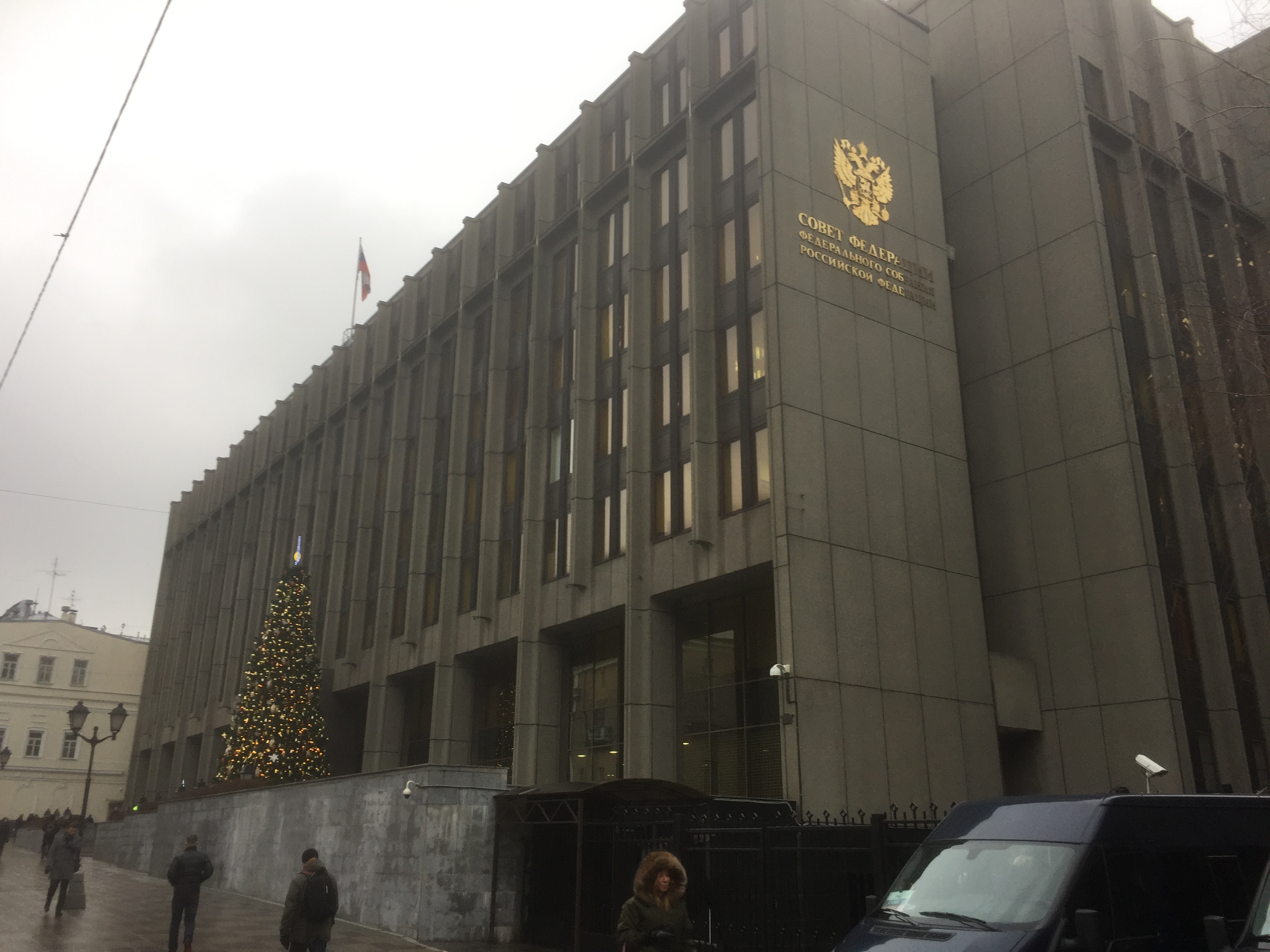
Federation Council Building in 2017

The Federation Council, (Note: Russian: Совет Федерации, romanized: Sovet Federatsii, common abbreviation: Совфед, Sovfed) fully the Federation Council of the Federal Assembly of the Russian Federation, (Note: Russian: Совет Федерации Федерального Собрания Российской Федерации, romanized: Sovet Federatsii Federal'nogo Sobraniya Rossiyskoy Federatsii) and informally the Senate, (Note: Russian: Сенат, romanized: Senat) is the upper house of the Federal Assembly, with the lower house being the State Duma. It was established by the Constitution of the Russian Federation in 1993.

Members of the Council have officially held the title of senators since the adoption of the 2020 constitutional amendments.

Each of the 89 federal subjects of Russia (including two annexed in 2014 and four more in 2022, which are not recognized by the international community), consisting of 24 republics, 48 oblasts, nine krais, three federal cities, four autonomous okrugs, and one autonomous oblast, sends two senators to the Council, for a base membership of 178 Senators. Following the 2020 constitutional amendments, the Constitution also provides for senators appointed by the President of the Russian Federation, which can be no more than 30 (up to seven of them for life), as well as former presidents who are entitled to become life senators.

The council holds its sessions within the Main Building on Bolshaya Dmitrovka Street in Moscow, the former home of the Soviet State Building Agency (Gosstroy), with further offices and committee rooms located on New Arbat Avenue. The two houses of the Federal Assembly are physically separated, with the State Duma residing in another part of Moscow on Okhotny Ryad Street. Sessions of the Federation Council take place in Moscow from 25 January to 15 July and from 16 September to 31 December. Sessions are open to the public, although the location of sessions can change if the Federation Council so desires, and secure closed sessions may be convoked.

For purposes of succession, the speaker (chairman) of the Federation Council is the third-highest position in the Russian Federation, after the president and the prime minister. In the case of incapacity of the president and prime minister, the chairman of the Federation Council becomes the Acting President of the Russian Federation.

== History ==
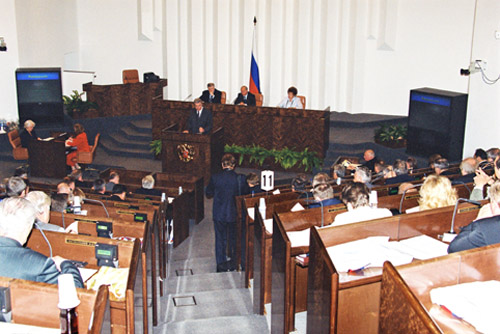
President Vladimir Putin before the Federation Council. May 21, 2002.

The modern history of the Federation Council begins during the 1993 constitutional crisis that pitted President Boris Yeltsin's unpopular neoliberal and governmental structure reforms against the increasingly radical Congress of People's Deputies, the nation's legislature. Throughout the year, the congress had grown increasingly dissatisfied with Yeltsin and his cabinet's management of the floundering Russian economy, as well as with its plans for a new constitution for the Russian Federation to replace the Soviet-era 1978 Russian SFSR Constitution still in effect. Amidst the increasingly tense crisis, on 21 September, Yeltsin issued presidential decree No. 1400. The decree effectively scrapped constitutional reform then in discussion, as well as legally dissolving the Congress of People's Deputies, ordering its replacement with an entirely new federal legislative structure, and granting the president increased executive powers. Following a war of words and acts of defiance from both sides, President Yeltsin abruptly ended the governmental power struggle by ordering the Russian army to bombard and storm the White House of Russia, the legislative building, between 2–4 October 1993.

Following the crushing of the Congress of People's Deputies and other members of the federal and territorial governments who had initially supported what he viewed as a rebellious legislature, Yeltsin presented a new constitution. With the events of 1993 very much in mind, Yeltsin drafted a constitution that called for increased executive branch powers in prime ministerial appointments, veto overrides, and a stronger executive security council. The constitution also called for the creation of a bicameral Federal Assembly, consisting of a State Duma and a Federation Council. Although Yeltsin had created a Federation Council in July 1993 to gather regional representatives (except Chechnya) to support an earlier draft of a replacement constitution to the 1978 document, this Federation Council was to become a permanent part of the legislature.

The procedure of the formation of the Federation Council through elections held according to a majority system was defined by presidential decrees No. 1626, to take effect from 11 October 1993, "On Elections to the Council of Federation of the Federal Assembly of the Russian Federation" and No. 1846, from 6 November 1993, "On Specification to the Resolution on Elections of Deputies to the State Duma and Resolution on Elections of Deputies to the Council of Federation of the Federal Assembly of the Russian Federation in 1993".

Similar to the United States Senate, the Federation Council would consist of two representatives from each of Russia's federal subjects. Unlike the State Duma, which consisted of representatives from hundreds of districts nationwide, the Federation Council was to act as more or less the voice of Russia's federated subdivisions. Early debate on its creation centered on whether or not the Federation Council should be elected at all. To solve some problems on the Council's first scheduled election in December, Yeltsin issued presidential decree No. 1628, on 11 October, stipulating that candidates for the first elections needed at least two percent, or 25,000 signatures—whichever was highest—of their oblast, republic, krai, autonomous okrug, or federal city population. This helped previous territorial elites remain within national politics. The decree also stipulated a single term of two years before new elections in 1995.

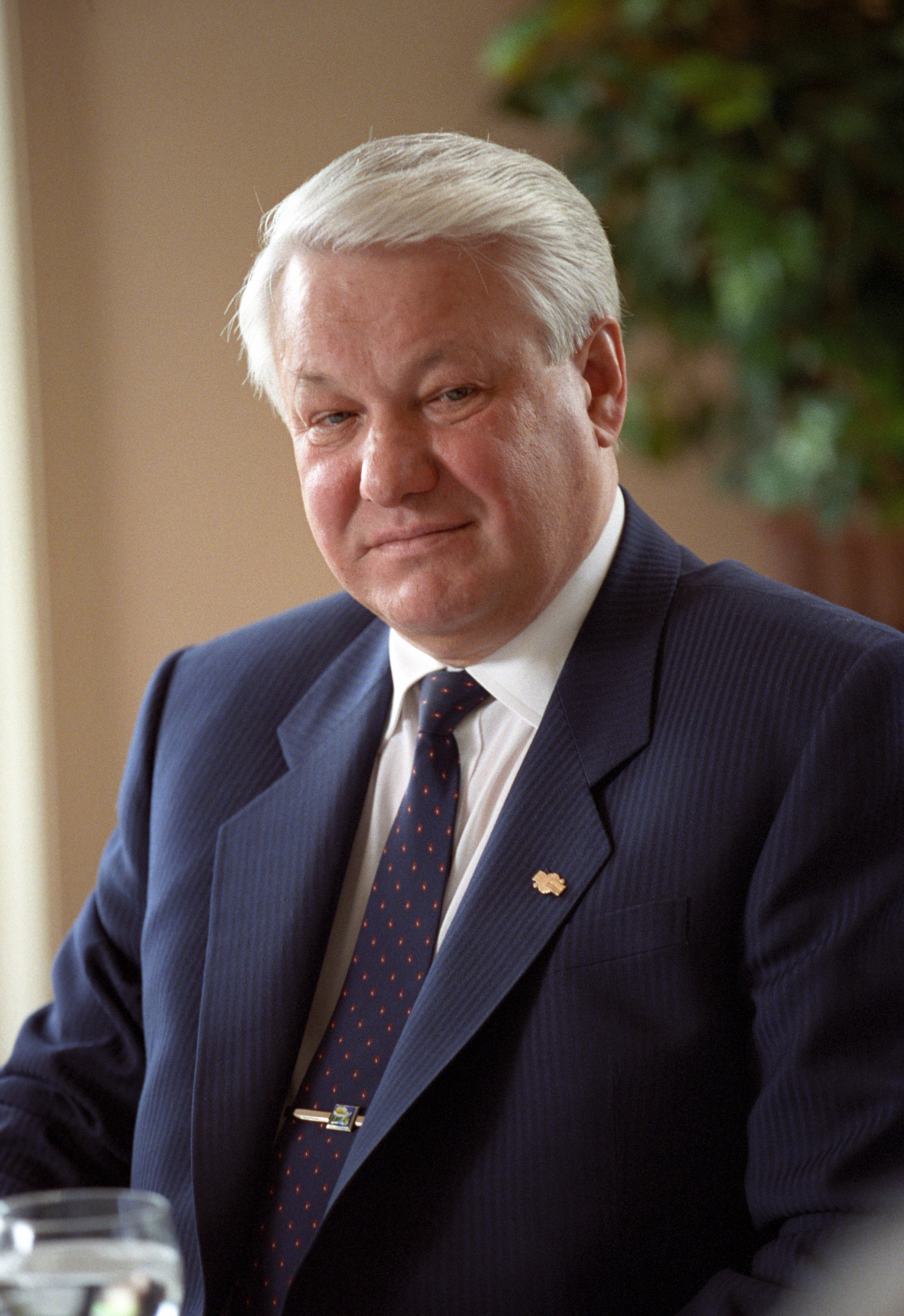
President Boris Yeltsin was instrumental in the creation of the Federation Council in 1993.

The Council's first elections were held on 12 December 1993, simultaneously with State Duma elections and a referendum on the new Constitution of the Russian Federation. With the constitution now in effect after its successful passage, elections for the Council were to be franchised solely to territorial authorities, with one senator elected from the subject's legislature, and the other by the subject's executive branch. This was later codified in 1995 when the Council's first term expired.

The constitution, however, did not specify how senators were to be elected. By 1995, using this constitutional anomaly, regional executives could sit ex officio in both their regional executive posts and within the Federation Council. While the State Duma held many of the serious debates on Russian policy during this time, the Council became a lobby for regional interests, competing for federal attention.

The ascension of President Vladimir Putin following Yeltsin's resignation on 31 December 1999 brought many new changes to the Federation Council. As part of his top political goals in his first months of office in 2000, Putin proposed a reform law to change the makeup of the Council, which would allow regional governors to designate councillors but not sit on the Council themselves, freeing it from what Putin saw as blatant personal cronyism on the part of regional leaders. The Council furiously resisted Putin's plan, conscious that their role in federal politics, their very ability to enjoy the fruits of living within Moscow, and their parliamentary immunity would end. With the State Duma threatening to override a Council veto, and Putin's threats to open federal criminal investigations against regional governors, the Council backed down and grudgingly supported the law in July 2000. Consequently, a wave of new Kremlin-friendly senators took the vacated seats, with the full backing of Putin. The last of the dual senator-governors were rotated out of office in early 2002.

Following the Beslan school hostage crisis in September 2004, President Putin initiated a radical shakeup of the federal system, proposing that the direct elections of regional governors be replaced by appointments by the president himself. These appointments could later be confirmed or rejected by the regional legislatures. The move further placed more control over the Council by the executive branch, due to laws that stipulate that regional executives have a say in choosing delegates to the Federation Council.

Since 2000, the Federation Council has largely remained a stable body. However, critics have charged that Putin's tactics in reforming the Council were blatantly undemocratic and anti-federal, arguing that the reforms created a rubber stamp body for the executive branch and the ruling United Russia party, similar to what the Soviet of Nationalities was during the Soviet period.

== Officers and members ==
As set in Article 101 of the Russian Constitution, the Federation Council "shall elect among its deputies the chairman of the Council." Some of the Chairman's official duties include presiding over sessions, formulating and introducing draft agendas, issuing orders and consulting with the Council's various committees, acting as the Council's official representative in the Federal Assembly, and signing resolutions to be forwarded to the president or the State Duma.

The current chairwoman is Valentina Matviyenko.

According to Article 98, all the members of the Council enjoy immunity from arrest, detainment, and searches. The law regarding the Federation Council has been amended multiple times to introduce and modify a residency requirement. Currently, a senator must have continuously resided in the territory they represent for at least five years immediately preceding their nomination, or for a total of twenty years, although there are exemptions for certain federal officials, diplomats, and military personnel.

The Federal Law defines the status of members of the Federation Council: "On Status of Members of the Council of Federation and Status of Deputy of the State Duma of the Federal Assembly of the Russian Federation".

=== Council of the Chamber ===
The steering body of the chamber is the Council of the Chamber (Russian: Совет палаты), which consists of the chairman, first deputy chairmen, deputy chairmen, and the chairmen of the Council's committees.

=== Political affiliation ===
Unlike the State Duma, with its division of parties and leaders, in 2002 parliamentary groups were forbidden following Mironov's election to the chairmanship, disbanding all political factions. By law, senators represent their regions and are officially non-partisan. However, many senators maintain membership or affiliation with major Russian political parties, most notably United Russia. Since the reforms of 2000, the Council has enjoyed a significantly close relationship with the Kremlin, helping to pass key legislation the Kremlin desires.

== Elections ==
Unlike the State Duma and the regional legislatures throughout Russia, the Council is not directly elected but instead is chosen by territorial politicians, resembling in some respects the structure of the U.S. Senate before the Seventeenth Amendment in 1913. The only exclusion to this was the first Federation Council (1994–1996), which was elected on 12 December 1993.

According to Article 95, the Council comprises representatives of each Russian federal subject—two from each. The regional legislature elects one senator, and the other is appointed by the regional governor. Before 2000, all provincial governors and heads of provincial legislatures were also members of the Council. Upon President Putin's ascension to the Russian presidency, this practice was discontinued under pressure from the Kremlin, forbidding governors to hold dual posts.

Terms of membership in the Council are also not nationally fixed, due to the continuing territorial nature of the chamber. Terms are determined according to the regional bodies they represent.

In 2001–2004 regional bodies were able to recall their senator by the same procedure by which they appointed them. Such recalls once occurred quite often. But a new law passed in December 2004 required that the chairman of the Federation Council must first initiate a recall procedure. The procedure has not been used since.

In December 2020, a new Law on the Procedure to Form the Federation Council was adopted following the constitutional amendments: according to the Law, the Federation Council consists of two delegates from each Russian constituent component, one representing the given region's legislative assembly and the other representing the provincial executive authorities. There will be two different election procedures, one for each member type. A candidate for the Senator from a constituent component's legislature must be a member of the component region's legislative assembly. Candidates are nominated by the chairman of the regional legislative assembly, by one party faction represented in the assembly, or by at least one-fifth of the assembly members. Then, the regional legislative assembly will vote to elect one of the nominated candidates.

In 2014, an amendment to the law was approved which allowed the president to nominate up to 17 senators. However, this was later superseded by the 2020 constitutional amendments, which established that the President of the Russian Federation can appoint up to 30 representatives (no more than seven of whom can be appointed for life), and that former presidents are entitled to become life senators.

The regional executive authority representative, the second type of delegate to the Federation Council, is appointed by the governor of that constituent component (or the head of that autonomous republic). The delegate is selected from among three people named by the candidates for the office of governor/head of the concerned region. The winner of the gubernatorial/republican leadership election then appoints one of the three delegates previously named for appointment to the Council as a senator from said region.

== Powers ==
The Federation Council is viewed as the more formal chamber of the Federal Assembly. Because of its federalist design and its voting franchise being strictly limited to provincial elites, the Council is viewed as less susceptible to radical changes.

The Council is charged with cooperating with the State Duma in completing and voting on draft laws. Federal laws concerning budgets, customs regulations, credit monitoring, and the ratification of international treaties are to be considered by the Council after they have been adopted by the State Duma, where most legislation is introduced.

Special powers that are accorded only to the Federation Council are outlined in Article 102 of the Constitution of the Russian Federation:

- Approval of changes in borders between the federal subjects of the Russian Federation;
- Approval of a decree of the President of the Russian Federation on the introduction of martial law;
- Approval of a decree of the President of the Russian Federation on the introduction of a state of emergency;
- Deciding on the possibility of using the Armed Forces of the Russian Federation outside the territory of the Russian Federation;
- Declaring of elections of the President of the Russian Federation;
- Impeachment of the President of the Russian Federation;
- Holding consultations on the president's nomination of heads of federal executive bodies (ministers) responsible for defense, security, internal affairs, justice, emergency situations, and foreign affairs;
- Holding consultations on the president's nomination of the Prosecutor General of the Russian Federation and their deputies;
- Approving the president's nomination of judges of the Constitutional Court of the Russian Federation and of the Supreme Court of the Russian Federation;
- Termination of the powers of the Chairman, Deputy Chairmen, and judges of the Constitutional Court, the Supreme Court, and other federal courts upon the proposal of the President;
- Appointment of the Chairman and half of the auditors of the Accounts Chamber.

For laws to pass the Federation Council, a vote of more than half of its 178 senators is required. When considering federal constitutional laws, three-fourths of the Council's votes are required for passage. If the Council vetoes a law passed by the State Duma, the two chambers are mandated to form a Conciliation Committee in order to form a compromise bill, on which both houses would have to vote again. A two-thirds majority of Duma deputies can override the Federation Council's veto.

== Committees ==
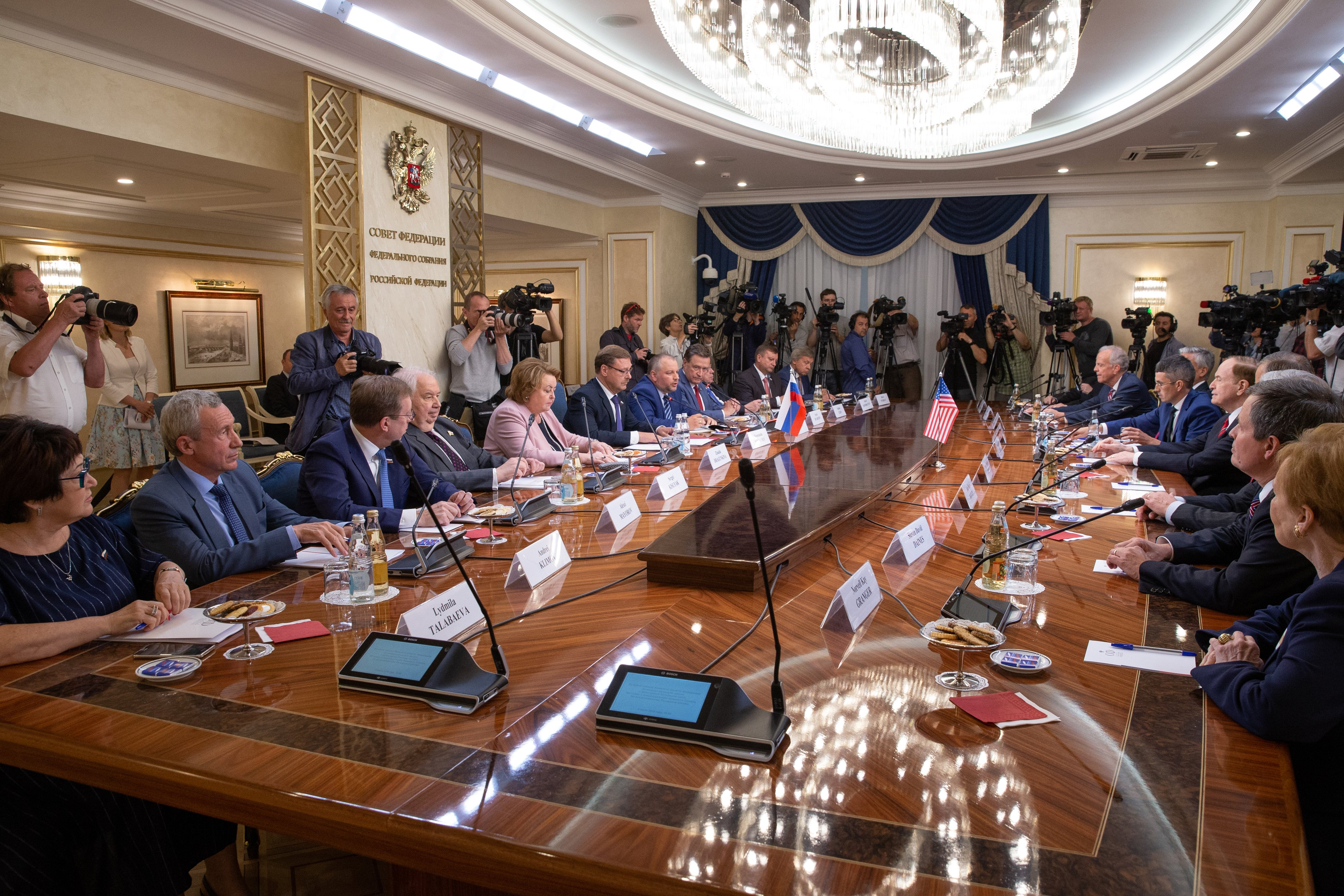
U.S. Congress delegation in Russia's Federation Council, July 3, 2018

Committees form a key component of the structure of the Council. Currently, ten committees exist for senators to consider legislation and policy on several issues ranging from foreign affairs, federal affairs, and social policy. Leadership in these committees is determined by the Council Chairman, who remains in correspondence with their findings. These committees include:

- Committee on Constitutional Legislation and State Building
- Committee on Federal Structure, Regional Policy, Local Government and Northern Affairs
- Committee on Defense and Security
- Committee on Foreign Affairs
- Committee on the Budget and Financial Markets
- Committee on Economic Policy
- Committee on Agriculture and Food Policy and Environmental Management
- Committee on Social Policy
- Committee on Science, Education and Culture
- Committee on the Rules of Procedure and Parliamentary Governance

== Chairmen of the Federation Council ==
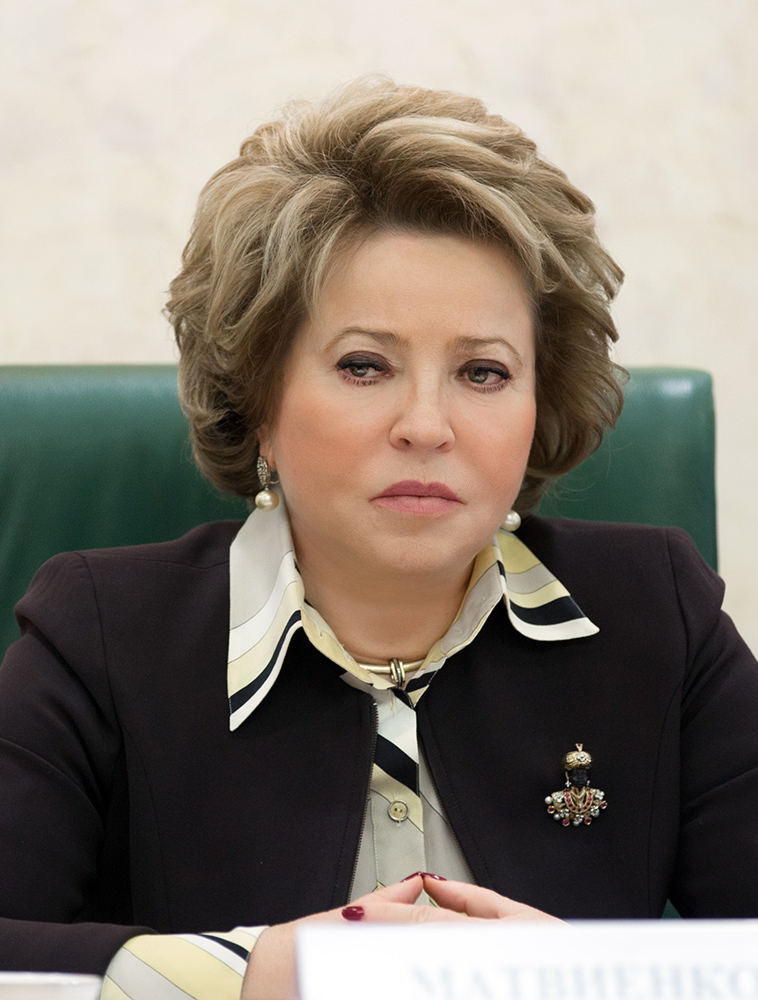
Valentina Matviyenko is current Chairwoman of the Federation Council.

- Vladimir Shumeyko (13 January 1994 – 23 January 1996)
- Yegor Stroyev (23 January 1996 – 5 December 2001)
- Sergey Mironov (5 December 2001 – 18 May 2011)
  - Aleksander Torshin (19 May – 21 September 2011) (acting)
- Valentina Matviyenko (21 September 2011 – present day)

== Presidential Envoys to the Federation Council ==
- Aleksandr Yakovlev (18 February 1994 – 10 February 1996; as Presidential Envoy to the Federal Assembly)
- Anatoly Sliva (10 February 1996 – 27 October 1998)
- Yury Yarov (7 December 1998 – 13 April 1999)
- Vyacheslav Khizhnyakov (12 May 1999 – 5 April 2004)
- Alexander Kotenkov (5 April 2004 – 30 October 2013)
- Artur Muravyov (Since 30 October 2013)

== See also ==
- List of deputy chairmen of the Federation Council of Russia
- List of members of the Federation Council (Russia)
- Politics of Russia
