= Mokretsov =

Mokretsov is a surname. Notable people with the surname include:

- Ilya Mokretsov (born 1984), Russian and Kazakh sabre fencer
- Mikhail Mokretsov (born 1961), Russian businessman and state official

== See also ==
- Mokretsevo, a village in Vologda Oblast in Russia
- Mokrets
