= Union Shield – 2011 =

Union Shield – 2011 (Russian: Щит Союза – 2011) was a joint Russian-Belarusian military exercise that took place from 16 to 22 September 2011.

== Background ==
Russian Defence Minister Anatoliy Serdyukov officially announced that the joint military exercise "Union Shield" is to take place in September 2011 after the meeting with his counterparts - Mykhailo Yezhel (the Ukrainian Defence Minister) and Yuri Zhadobin (the Defence Minister of the Republic of Belarus), which was held in Minsk, April, 2011.

== Exercise planning ==
The concept for the exercise was being developed jointly by the Russian and Belarusian General Staffs, with input from the Russian Armed Forces' Western Military District staff. The exercise will be held at the Gorokhovetskiy range in Nizhniy Novgorod Region and Ashuluk Range in Astrakhan Region. The decision to conduct the drills in Russia was made due to the scale of planned exercise. The size of abovementioned territories should allow the participants to accomplish the full range of tasks. The officials pointed out that the decision to hold the Union Shield-2011 exercise in Russia away from borders with NATO member-states was made in order to show the transparency of the Union State's peaceloving policy and to confirm the defensive nature of the Russia-Belarus Regional Group of Forces. The Russian part of the regional group of troops were led by Col-Gen Arkadiy Bakhin, commander of troops of the Western Military District. The Belarusian part were led by Maj-Gen Pyotr Tikhonovsky, Chief of the General Staff, First Deputy Defence Minister of Belarus.

== Scope ==
The military exercise involved approximately 12,000 servicemen, among them 7,000 from Russia and 5,000 from Belarus, as well as up to 50 airplanes and helicopters and 200 units of military hardware, including 100 tanks. According to the official information, the exercise was aimed at improving combat readiness of the Belarus-Russian regional joint force, as well as raising interoperability between commanders, staffs and units of the two countries. During the active stage of the manoeuvres, at the Ashuluk testing ground, the aerial part of the training will be conducted, which will involve complex engagement of RJF's air-defence and ground forces as part of the unified regional air defence system of Russia and Belarus. The Belarusian troops are redeployed to the Russian firing ranges by rail and air. One of the exercise's peculiarities was the participation of cadets from the Belarusian Military Academy and the military department of the Belarusian State University of Informatics and Radioelectronics as junior commanders. Participating in the manoeuvres, the cadets had an opportunity both to solidify their theoretical knowledge and get practice in exercising command and control over units, which they were assigned to.

== Ukrainian participation ==
Following a meeting with Russian Defence Minister Anatoliy Serdyukov and Belarusian Defence Minister Yuri Zhadobin in April, Ukrainian Defense Minister Mykhailo Yezhel said that Ukraine will join the Russian-Belarusian military exercise “Union Shield 2011”. Yezhel said Ukraine will study the drills in detail, paying particular attention to Belarus’s army reform. He added Kyiv should take the best advice and information Russia and Belarus have to offer and incorporate it at home. On the 25 August, Russian Armed Forces' General Staff Chief Gen. Nikolai Makarov had said that this year, for the first time in the post-Soviet era, an airmobile unit of the Armed Forces of Ukraine took part in the joint maneuvers Union Shield – 2011. He also noted that Russia and Ukraine participate in the annual joint naval exercise Farvater Mira (Fairway of Peace) and it's time for two countries to go to a new level of co-operation.

== Medical support ==
First aid during the exercise was provided by a Special purposes medical detachment. It was equipped with a modularized combat support hospital with a robotized deployment process. It included various modules - consultative/diagnostic, X-ray module, antishock module, lab module. Ambulatory and special care were carried out in the military hospital, which is situated in Mulino, Nizhniy Novgorod Region. Exercise planners deployed more than 400 medical workers, 50 medical transportation units, including aeromedical transportation units.
