= Daniil Yegorov =

Commissioner of the Federal Taxation Service of Russia

- Даниил Егоров
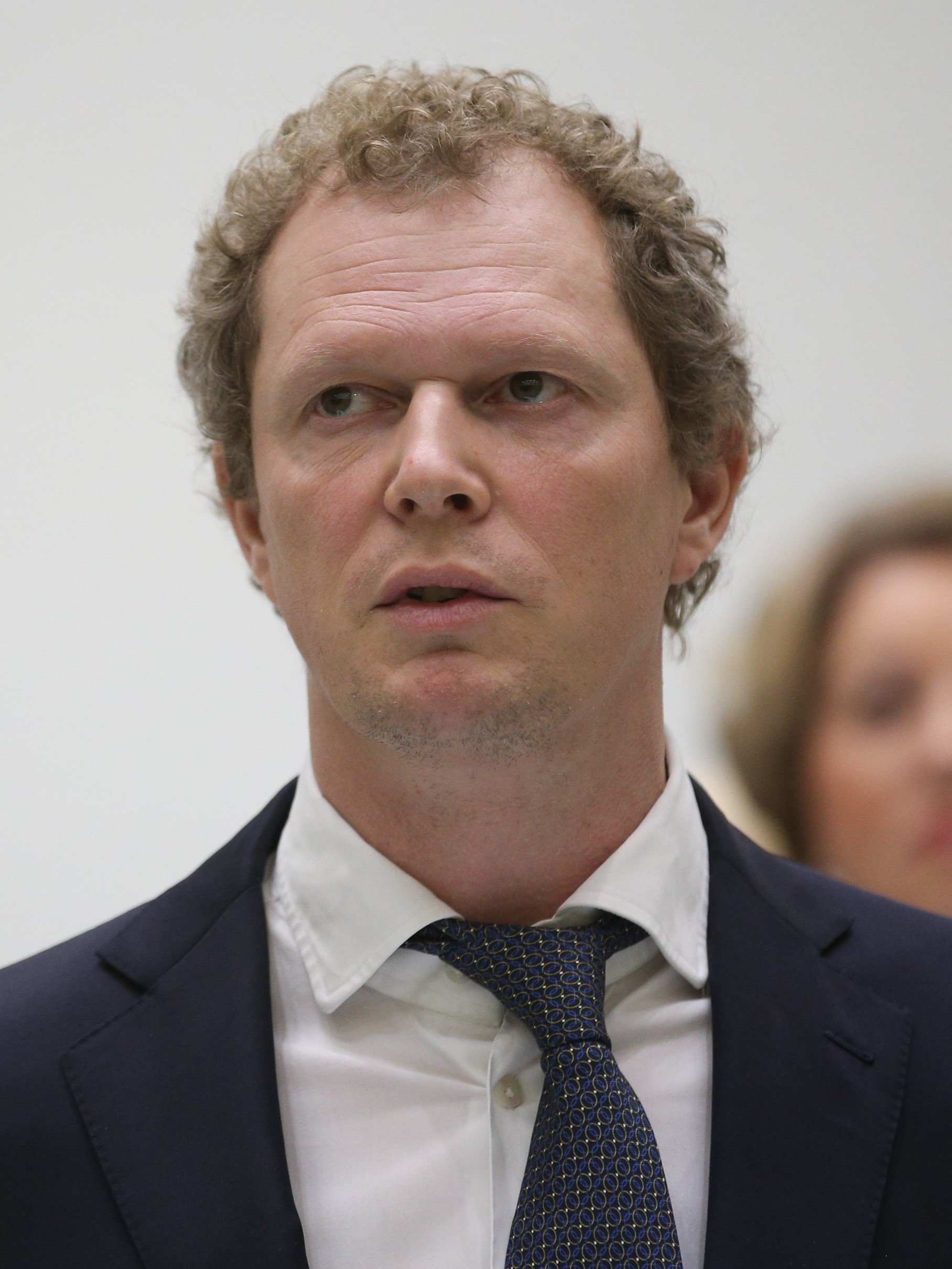
- Yegorov in 2021

Commissioner of the Federal Taxation Service
- Incumbent
- Assumed office 17 January 2020
- President: Vladimir Putin
- Prime Minister: Mikhail Mishustin
- Preceded by: Mikhail Mishustin

Personal details
- Born: Daniil Vyacheslavovich Yegorov; September 7, 1975 (age 51) Moscow, RSFSR, USSR
- Children: 2
- Education: Peoples' Friendship University of Russia
- Profession: Lawyer, Official
- Awards: Order of Honour; Medal of the Order "For Merit to the Fatherland"

Military service
- Allegiance: Russia
- Branch/service: Federal Taxation Service
- Rank: 1st class Active State Councillor of the Russian Federation

Daniil Vyacheslavovich Yegorov (Russian: Даниил Вячеславович Егоров; born 7 September 1975) is a Russian lawyer serving as Commissioner of the Federal Taxation Service since 2020. Prior to his appointment, he spent nine years as the service's Deputy Director. He has been described as a leading "young technocrat" in Moscow.

Since 26 October 2020, Yegorov holds the highest federal state civilian service rank - 1st class Active State Councillor of the Russian Federation.

== Early life and education ==
In 1998, he graduated from the Peoples' Friendship University of Russia with a specialist degree in jurisprudence (law degree).

== Career ==
=== Legal career ===
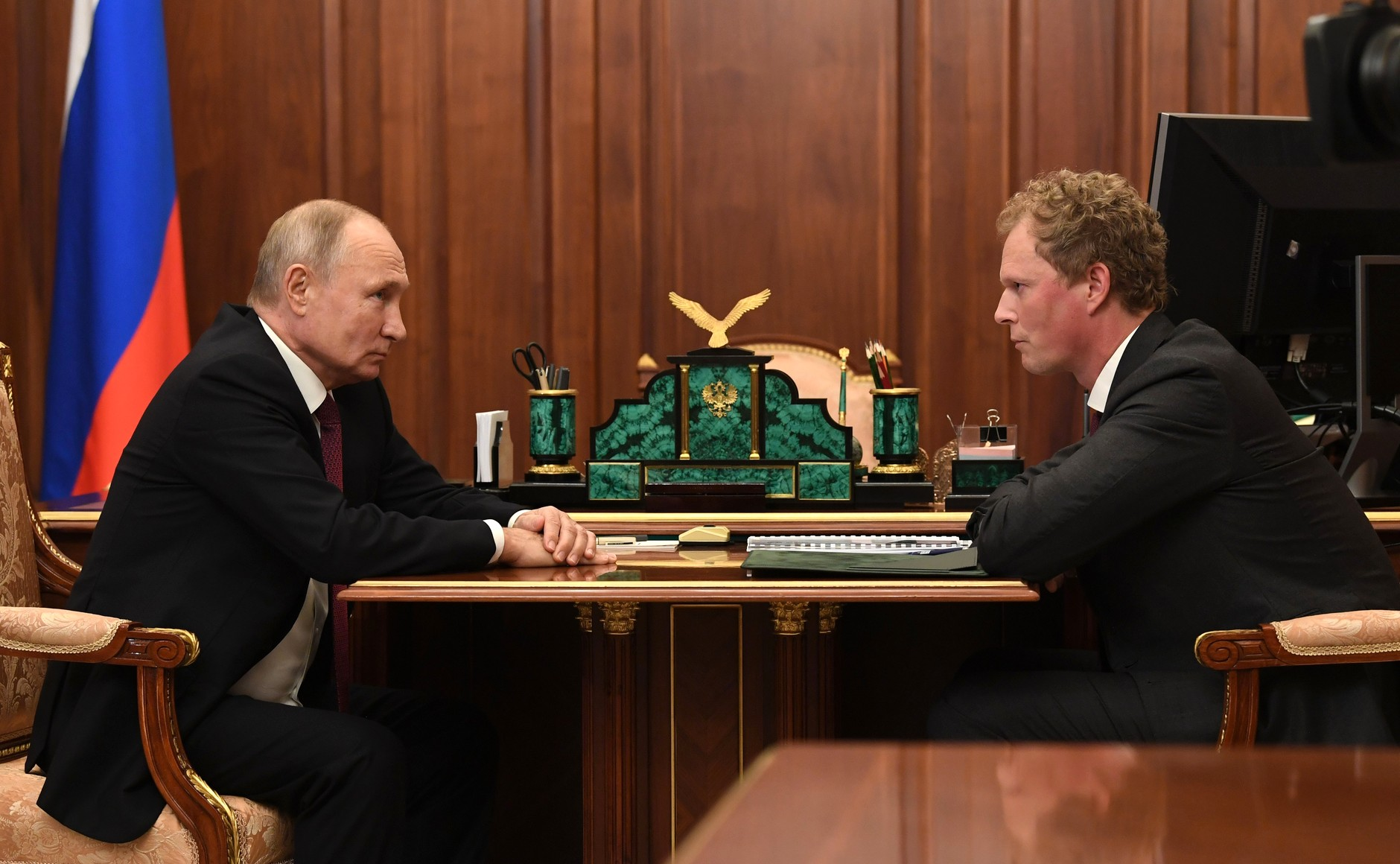
Yegorov in his first public meeting with Vladimir Putin

Following college, from 2000 to 2001, Yegorov was a member of the commission of the Interregional Collegium of Advocates for Assistance to Enterprises and Citizens (but he didn't have an advocate's status). During this period he worked as a legal counsel and - subsequently - as a head of the legal department for the private joint-stock company Eneko.

=== Federal Tax Service career ===
In late 2001, he left the private sector and became a federal state civilian service official. His first appointment was a position of a 1st category specialist and consultant of the department for the city of Moscow of the Ministry of Taxes and Tax Collection of Russia. He served in the tax service ever since, assuming leadership of the department of information support, electronic data entry and office inspections in 2003, subsequently moving to the lead role in the office inspections department at the Interdistrict Inspectorate of the Ministry of Taxes and Duties of Russia No. 44. In 2005 he took over the dual roles of head of the department of desk inspections and head of the department of field inspections No. 2 of the Interdistrict Inspectorate of the Federal Tax Service of Russia No. 50 in Moscow. In 2009 he moved up to Deputy Head of the Control Department, and the following year took over as head of the Department of Dispute Resolution for Individuals and Major Taxpayers, and head of the Pre-trial Audit Directorate. In 2011, he was appointed to the position of the Deputy Head of the Federal Taxation Service.

He was promoted to the federal state civilian service rank of the 3rd class Active State Councillor of the Russian Federation (the Presidential Decree of 31 August 2012 No.1251) and - subsequently - to the rank of the 2nd class Active State Councillor of the Russian Federation (the Presidential Decree of 31 March 2014 No.185).

=== Head of the Federal Tax Service ===
Yegorov was appointed to the position of the Head of the Federal Taxation Service by the Prime Minister Mikhail Mishustin Order of 17 January 2020 No.21-R. He is the first lawyer to ever hold this position.

Yegorov was promoted to the federal state civilian service rank of the 1st class Active State Councillor of the Russian Federation by the Presidential Decree of 26 October 2020 No.642.

Almost immediately upon assuming office, Yegorov was confronted with the COVID-19 pandemic, and has led Russia's tax service in an effort to build a digital universal basic income infrastructure to be able to provide minimum wage financial assistance to displaced employees laid off in any future lockdowns during the duration of the pandemic. The system would also allow direct payments to endangered companies.

== Sanctions ==
In December 2022 the EU sanctioned Daniil Yegorov in relation to the 2022 Russian invasion of Ukraine.

== Awards ==
Yegorov is a recipient of the following medals and orders:

- II Class Medal of the Order "For Merit to the Fatherland" (the Presidential Decree of 15 November 2013 No.843)
- Order of Honour (the Presidential Decree of 12 June 2017 No.266)

== Personal life ==
Yegorov is married and has two children. He is an avid skier and snowboarder, and is fluent in English, with an interest in literature and theater.

== Assets and income ==
In 2018 Yegorov and his wife each earned 8.2 million rubles ($111,000 USD) according to their tax statements.

In 2019 Yegorov earned 44.9 million rubles ($611,000 USD), which the press service of the Federal Tax Service explained consisted of his salary at the tax service, income from the sale of property, and external bank deposits. His wife's income also increased to 28.63 million rubles ($390,000 USD).

Yegorov and his wife own six apartments, the largest, a 2,120 square feet (197 m^{2}) condo, officially belongs to Yegorov's wife.
