= Moscow State University of Technology =

Russian university

Moscow State University of Technology "STANKIN"
- Московский государственный технологический университет «Станкин»
- View of the main building
- Other name: STANKIN
- Former names: Moscow Machine and Tool Institute
- Motto: «Конструктор новой индустрии»
- Motto in English: "The architect of a new industry"
- Type: Public
- Established: 1930
- Founder: Yakov Fabianovich Kagan-Shabshay
- Rector: Boris Vasilyevich Padalkin
- Academic staff: 528
- Students: around 5,000
- Postgraduates: 651
- Doctoral students: 43
- Location: Moscow, Russia; 55°47′23″N 37°35′42″E
- Language: Russian
- Website: stankin.ru
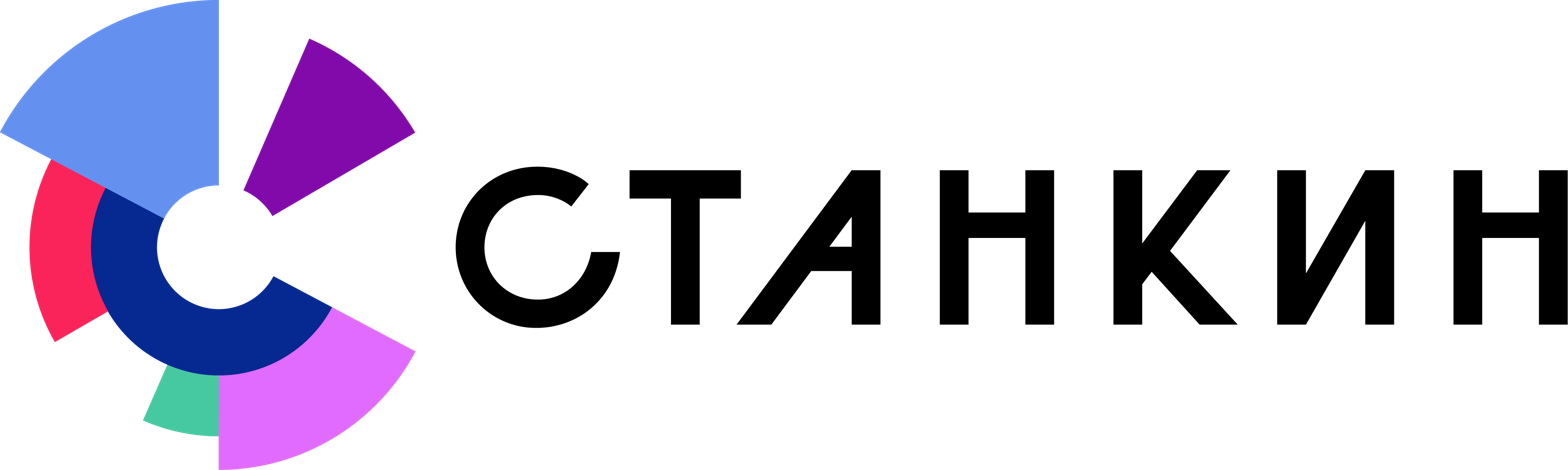

University rankings

Regional – Overall
- QS Emerging Europe and Central Asia: 251-300 (2022)

The Moscow State University of Technology (Russian: Московский Государственный Технологический Университет), commonly known as STANKIN (Станкин), is a state technical university in Moscow, Russia. It was founded as Moscow Machine and Tool Institute (Московский станкоинструментальный институт) in 1930. Today STANKIN trains specialists in machinery, robotics, CNC's, electronics, automation and control systems, economics of enterprises, informatics and measurement systems.

== History ==
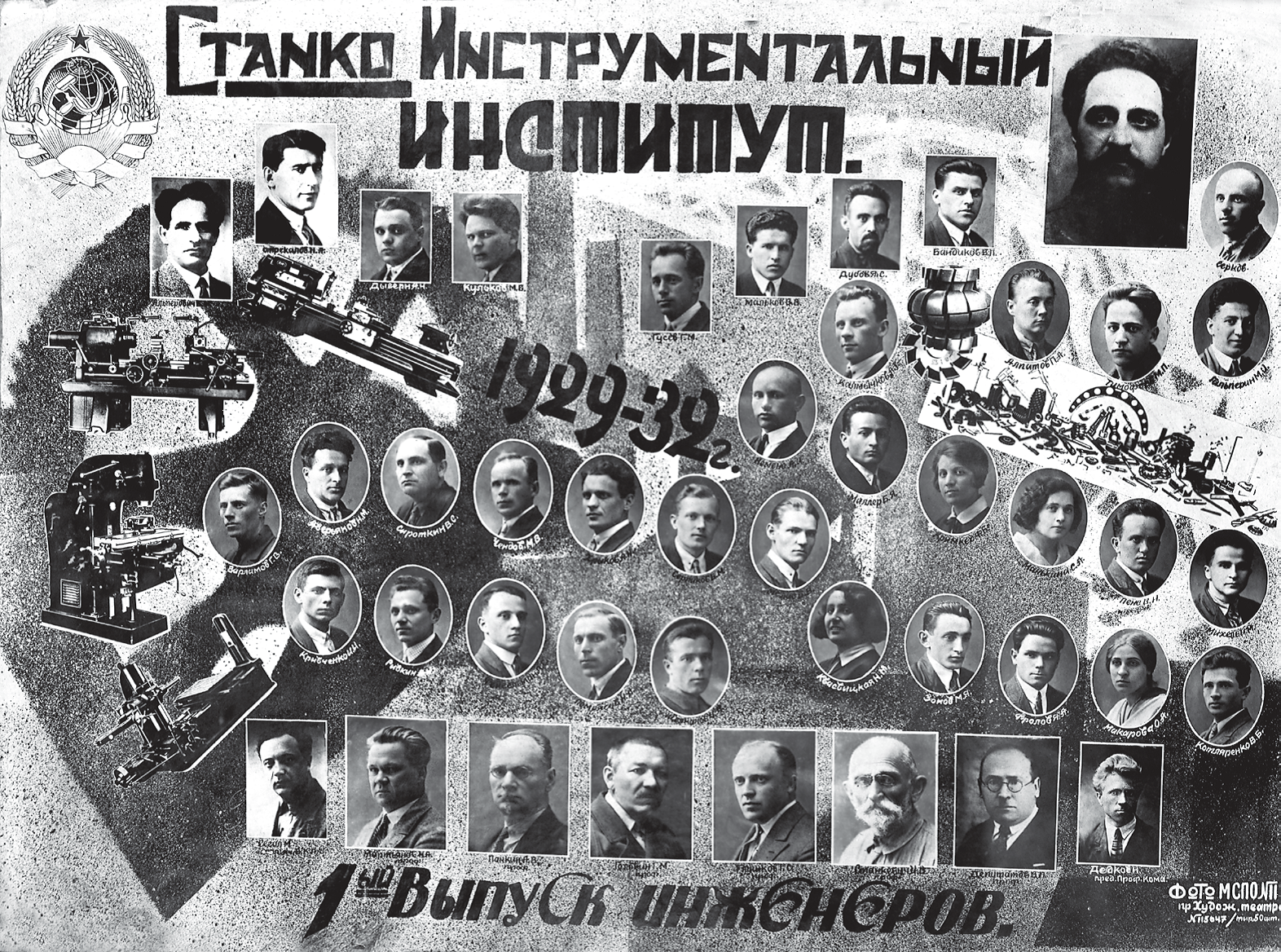
The first graduation of engineers

The university was founded as the Moscow Machine Tool Institute in 1930 to provide the machine tool industry with qualified specialists.

Today STANKIN is a scientific industrial complex with the Technological Design Institute of Informatic of the Russian Academy of Sciences (RSA). It has relations with universities and firms from Austria, Brazil, Germany, Hungary, Italy, China, USA, South Korea and other countries.

There are more than 600 professors and scientists working at Stankin today. Stankin has its own newspaper Stankinovskiy vestnik and a peer-reviewed journal with an international editorial board Vestnik MGTU STANKIN from 2009 (lit. 'MSUT STANKIN Messenger') included in Web of Science databases.

== Education ==
The research covers various areas, including the automation of technological processes and manufacturing, engineering ecology and security in machine building, information and marketing in machine building, information systems, quality of production and management, computerization of computation durability of machine building construction, computer modeling in instrumental techniques, computer control systems in production and business, tool engineering and computer modeling, laser technology, presses and metal treatment technology, metal cutting machines and tools, design and computer modeling of plastic deformation systems, robotics and mechatronic systems, system production of automated technological machinery, computer-aided design systems, metrological production systems, computer-controlled machine tools, technological information of automated manufacturing technology, technology and business in no-waste production, technology and management in instrumental manufacturing, mechanical engineering, physics of high-concentrated energy, and the economy and control of production.

== Research ==
=== Contracts with foreign firms and universities ===
- The agreement for scientific and technical cooperation with Technische Universität Berlin and the University of Stuttgart.
- Together with Technical university of Budapest there is a preparation of masters and doctors of sciences.
- The contract with the firm TONGIL Heavy, Ltd. (South Korea)
- Cooperation with the firm REVINGTON GROUP (USA)
- Scientific and technical cooperation with the institute ITRI (Taiwan)
- Joint scientific - educational laboratory with the firm HP (USA)

== Notable alumni ==
- Mikhail Fradkov, Prime Minister of Russia
- Mikhail Mishustin, Prime Minister of Russia
- Dmitry Chernyshenko, Deputy Prime Minister of Russia

== Gallery ==
1st May Celebration.

Moscow Metro thematic train.
