= Anatoly Serdyukov =

Russian politician and businessman (born 1962)

- Анатолий Сердюков
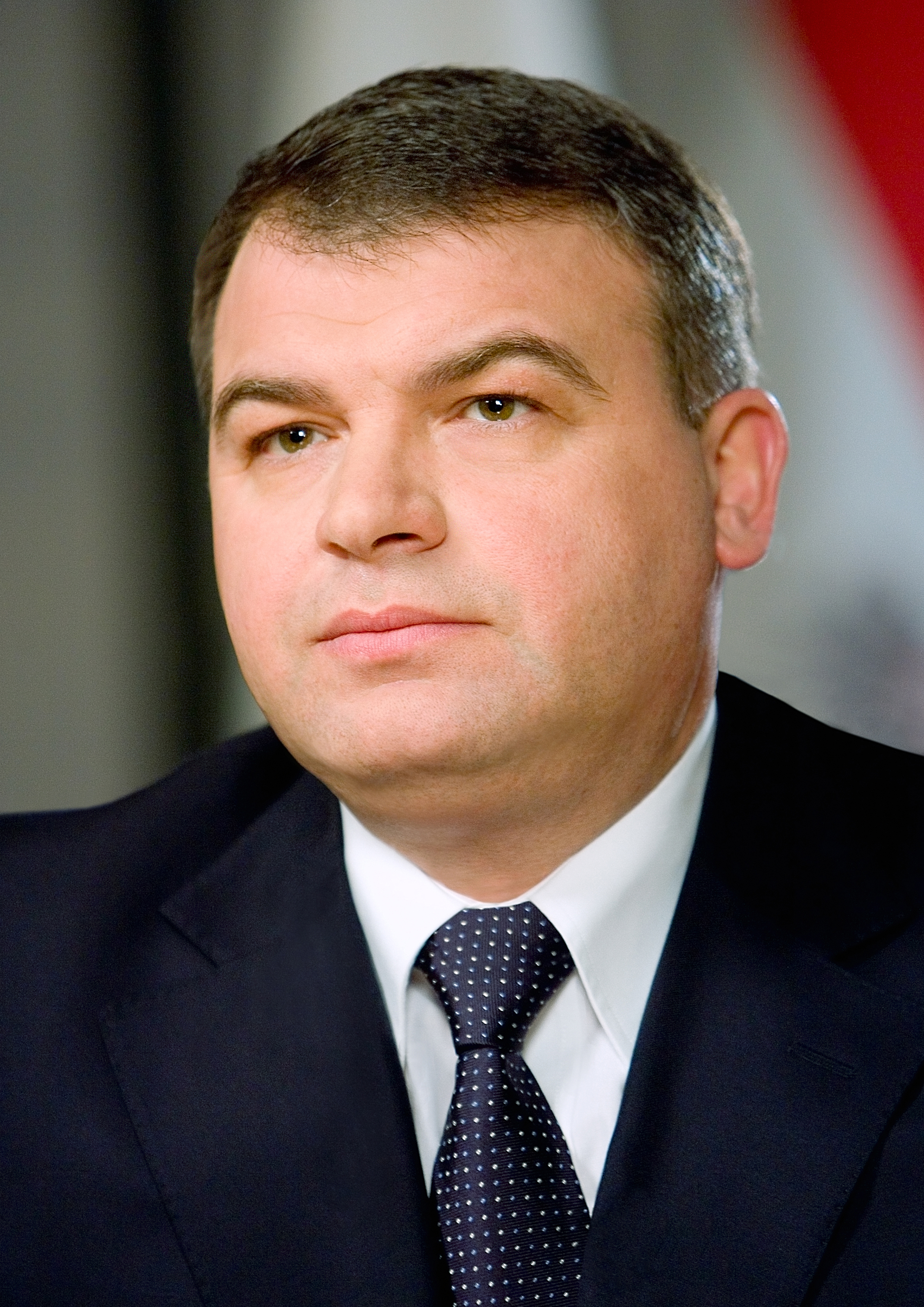
- Official portrait, 2007

6th Minister of Defence
- In office 15 February 2007 – 6 November 2012
- Prime Minister: Mikhail Fradkov; Viktor Zubkov; Vladimir Putin; Viktor Zubkov (acting); Dmitry Medvedev
- Preceded by: Sergei Ivanov
- Succeeded by: Sergei Shoigu

Director of the Federal Taxation Service
- In office 27 July 2004 – 21 February 2007
- Prime Minister: Mikhail Fradkov
- Preceded by: Gennady Bukaev (as Minister for Tax and Levies)
- Succeeded by: Mikhail Mokretsov

Personal details
- Born: 8 January 1962 (age 64) Krasnodar Krai, Russian SFSR, Soviet Union (now Russia)
- Party: United Russia
- Spouse: Yulia Zubkova
- Education: Leningrad Institute of Soviet Trade; Saint Petersburg State University
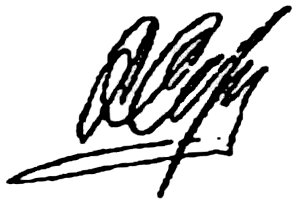
- Signature

Anatoly Eduardovich Serdyukov (Russian: Анатолий Эдуардович Сердюков; born 8 January 1962) is a Russian politician and businessman. He was Russia's Minister of Defense from 15 February 2007 to 6 November 2012, and made several major reforms in the Russian military. He has worked as an Industrial Director for Rostec, a state corporation, since October 2015.

== Early life and education ==
Born at Krasnodar Krai on 8 January 1962, Serdyukov graduated from the Leningrad Institute of Soviet Trade in 1984 with a degree in economics. In 2001, Serdyukov graduated from the Law Department of Saint Petersburg State University.

== Career ==
In 1985, after release from compulsory military service, he began work as an assistant manager, and later manager, at a furniture shop of Lenmebeltorg – a Leningrad furniture manufacturer and retailer. In 1991, he was promoted to Deputy Commercial Director of Lenmebeltorg. He was promoted to General Director when Lenmebeltorg transformed into JSC (Saint-Petersburg Industrial Company). From 1993 to 2000 he worked at Mebel-Market company, Saint Petersburg, first as Deputy Director, then as Marketing Director, and finally from 1995-2000 as CEO. Serdyukov's already successful career further developed in tandem with his father-in-law's, Viktor Zubkov, and after the election of Vladimir Putin as Russian President in 2000. From 2000 to 2001, Serdyukov, working under his father-in-law Viktor Zubkov, served as Deputy Chief of the Saint Petersburg Directorate of the Tax Ministry of Russia (now Federal Taxation Service of Russia). From 2001 to 2004, he led the directorate, succeeding Viktor Zubkov. On 2 March 2004, he was appointed Deputy Tax Minister of Russia.

=== Minister of Taxes (2004–2007) ===
From 2004 to 2007, he led the Tax Ministry (in July 2004 reorganized into the Federal Tax Service of Russia). During this period, the key officials of the service were replaced mainly by Serdyukov's colleagues from Saint Petersburg. He also often resorted to personnel rotation and appointment of former federal tax officials to the regional tax service departments in the federal subjects of Russia. During his tenure, court decisions in favour of the federal tax service became much more common. While the service was formally subordinate to the Finance Ministry under Alexey Kudrin, in fact Serdyukov very much leaned towards Presidential aide Viktor Ivanov.

=== Minister of Defense (2007–2012) ===
On 15 February 2007, President Vladimir Putin appointed Serdyukov as Minister of Defence, with the main task of fighting corruption and inefficiency in the Russian Armed Forces. This started a conflict that would last through Serdyukov's time as Defense Minister with the General Staff of the Armed Forces of the Russian Federation, as the General Staff considered the appointment of a civilian, primarily a former furniture dealer and with no remarkable military background, as an insult. To heighten the conflict, the Chief of the General Staff at the time, Yuri Baluyevsky, demanded that the new Defence Minister would have to spend 1 month in the General Staff as "preparatory training" to have an idea of the "job at hand". On 14 September 2007, Serdyukov offered his resignation to the president over family relations with Viktor Zubkov, but this resignation was not accepted. However, before Putin responded, Baluyevsky did publicly support the resignation of Serdyukov and stated sarcastically that "the next Defence Minister could be a woman". After Putin rejected the resignation of Serdyukov, Serdyukov retaliated by organising an audit and inspection how the senior members of General Staff managed with the mandatory physical requirements test for Armed Forces members. Most of them failed and hence created a storm in the Russian media.

==== Activities at Ministry of Defense (MoD) ====
In office, Serdyukov chose not to get involved in the daily administration of troops and operational-strategic planning, leaving these matters to the professionals. Instead, he focused on organizational and budgetary issues, in which he, according to Moscow Defense Brief, "insisted upon an unprecedented (at least for the MoD) level of precision and fastidiousness." This reportedly enabled him to quickly "put the generals in their place," and "to instill a level of background fear that even the old-timers do not recall having seen before." According to an anecdote, an officer in one of the central directorates of the MoD explained: "senior generals go to meetings of the Defense Board as to the scaffold."

To deal with the budgetary issues, Serdyukov brought in his old colleagues from the Federal Tax Service and created a new department in the MoD for financial control. The MoD had no control nor oversight until then over the management of the defence budget. This had all been managed so far by the General Staff. Years before Serdyukov's appointment as Minister of Defence, the Russian defence budget had been growing significantly but the additional funding disappeared on a regular basis and were not visible anywhere. Apparently, bringing this under control was the first and most important reason why Serdyukov was considered and appointed as Minister of Defence.

According to Moscow Defense Brief, Serdyukov’s first year in office was marked by convulsions, "the likes of which have not been seen on the Arbat in decades." The magazine pointed out, that "Serdyukov brought apparently unlimited energy to a thorough purge of the department." He fired almost a third of the top officers of the Central Military Administration and initiated a sea of change in the Ministry of Defense.

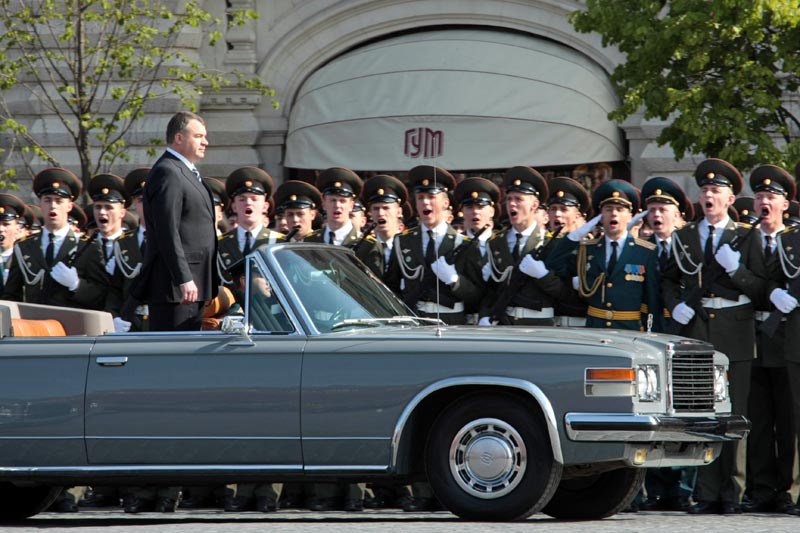
Serdyukov inspecting the military parade on the Red Square, 9 May 2008

During his time in office, Serdyukov launched several wide-reaching reforms. The main rationale behind his reforms was the transformation from a mass mobilization army to a small force of contract soldiers.

In 2010, Serdyukov launched a $430 billion military reform to be achieved over the next 15 years in order to fully re-equip Russian conventional forces.

Serdyukov also launched plans to reduce personnel in the central administration by 30%, which would lead to the liquidation of a significant number of positions filled by generals and colonels. He demanded drastic cuts in the Russian officer corps. There was one officer to every two and a half men. After the reform, there would be just one to every 15, more analogous to western armies. The reform would mean losing 200,000 jobs, and was met with fierce political opposition by the "old guard." Because of the pressure, the deadline for implementing the cuts was put back from 2012 to 2016. Army divisions were disbanded and replaced by brigades. The six military districts of Russia were replaced by four geographic commands.

Addressing acute and long-standing issues such as the ineffectiveness of Russia’s defense industrial and procurement policies was also one of Serdyukov's chief aims. The questions addressed included: "why, with so much spending on defense, do the Armed Forces possess so little new equipment? Why does the design and testing of many new types of armament take decades to show results?" Serdyukov initiated modifications to the Russian military uniform and addressed the issue of the physical condition of Russia’s generals and senior officers: the entire service personnel of the General Staff, irrespective of rank, must now meet set physical standards upon threat of dismissal. He also called for mergers of Military academies, sharp cuts in the number of military bases, and reductions in rear support and noncombat units.

Many of Serdyukov's reforms and anti-corruption measures were met with open opposition and led to many dismissals. His actions, however, gave him a positive image in the eyes of the Russian public.

Severe disagreements were reported in late 2007 and early 2008 between Serdyukov and General of the Army Yuri Baluyevsky – Chief of the General Staff – over the Minister's proposed relocation of the Russian Navy Main Staff from Moscow to Saint Petersburg. Later, this was proved by following Baluyevsky's resignation.

==== Dismissal from Ministry of Defense (2012–2014) ====
In 2001, Serdyukov, his wife Julia Zubkova, and Yevgeniya Vasilyeva all were classmates and graduated from Law School at Saint Petersburg State University (Russia). In 2010, Yevgeniya Vasilyeva began working at the Ministry of Defense, with Serdyukov as her boss. At some point in time, Serdyukov and Yevgeniya Vasilyeva began an illicit adulterous love affair while Serdyukov was still married to Viktor Zubkov's daughter. In 2012, Yevgeniya Vasilyeva came under investigation for corruption as head of the Ministry of Defense, Department of Property Relations.

On 25 October 2012, Vasilyeva's apartment was searched in connection with the case. Discovered and seized from the apartment were more than three million rubles, nearly $747,000 worth of diamonds, several dozen paintings, pearls, and other jewelry, amongst other things. Also discovered at her apartment was the married Minister of Defense, Anatoly Serdyukov. Serdyukov's father-in-law, Viktor Zubkov, still powerful as the chairman of Gazprom and still a close ally of Vladimir Putin, was reportedly very angry when Serdyukov's adulterous affair was discovered. On 6 November 2012 - twelve days after Serdyukov was discovered in Yevgeniya Vasilyeva's apartment - he was dismissed (fired) by Putin and was replaced by Sergei Shoigu.

In November 2013, Serdyukov was charged by Russian investigators with "negligence" for ordering the army to build a road from a village to a private country residence in Russia's south. He was amnestied in 2014 by a presidential decree.

=== Rostec (2015–present) ===
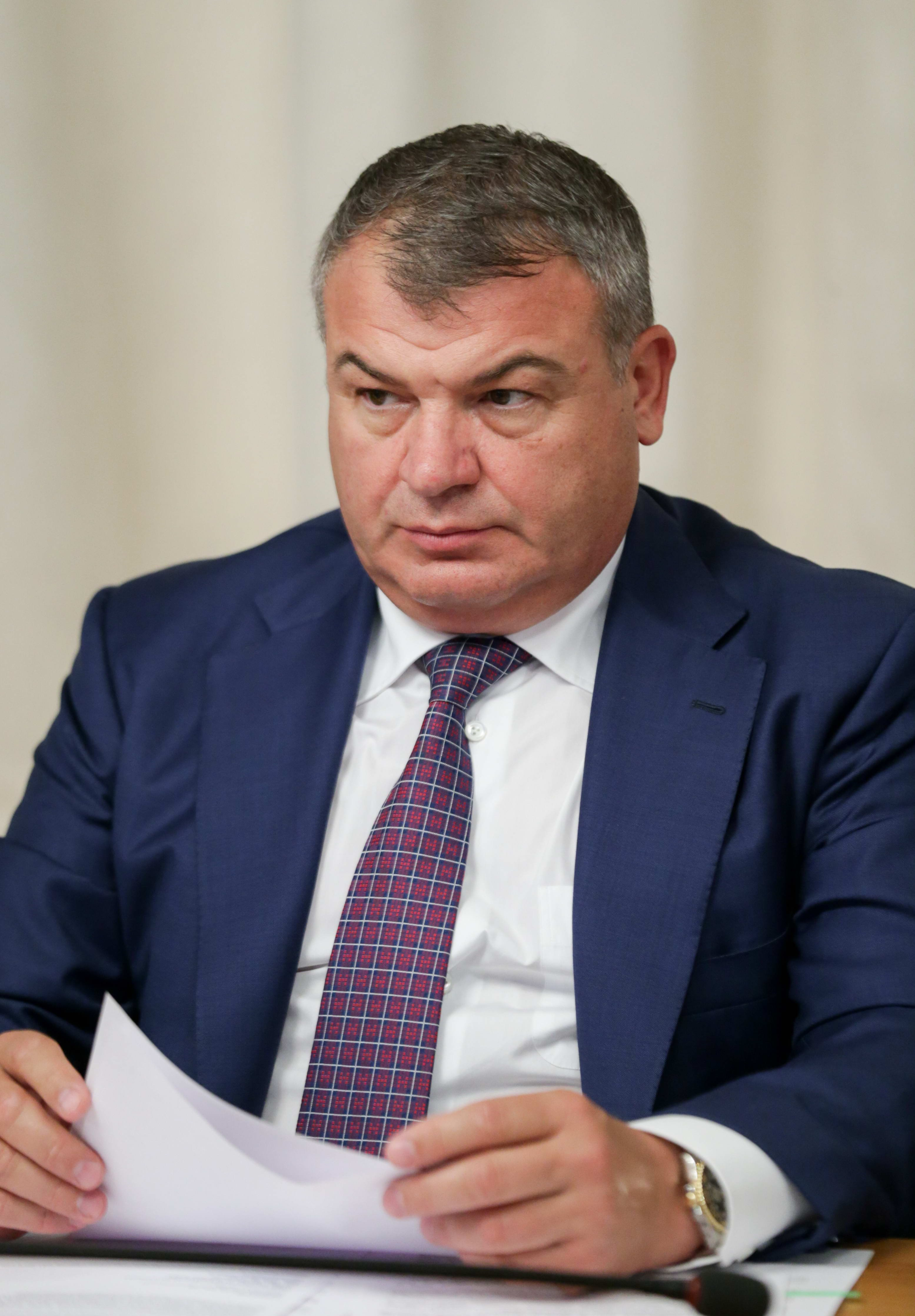
Serdyukov in 2018

In October 2015, he was appointed as an Industrial Director of Rostec State Corporation. His duties include supervising of all the company's aviation-related activities from helicopter-building to airplane engines.

== Personal life ==
He was the eldest child in the family. He has a sister Puzikova Galina Eduardovna, entrepreneur.

Married three times.

- First wife was Serdyukova Tatiana Anatolievna. They have a son, Sergey Anatolyevich Serdyukov (born 23 June 1986).
- The second wife was Yulia Viktorovna Pohlebenina (Zubkova), daughter of Viktor Zubkov, the 10th Prime Minister of Russia and previous chairman of the Federal Financial Monitoring Service of Russia. The daughter is Natalia Anatolyevna Serdyukova. The adopted daughter is Anastasia Nikolaevna Pohlebenina.
- The third wife is Vasilyeva Evgenia Nikolaevna.

=== Hobby ===
He goes skiing, enjoys fishing and hunting.

=== Sanctions ===
Sanctioned by the US in June 2022, on 23 February 2023 Serdyukov was also sanctioned by the United Kingdom for supporting the Russian government in relation to the 2022 Russian invasion of Ukraine.

== Awards ==
- Medal «For merits» (Federal Bailiff Service of Russia, 22 November 2006);
- Certificate of honor Central Election Commission of Russian Federation (2 April 2008) — for active assistance and substantial assistance in organizing and conducting 2008 Russian presidential election;
- Order of Holy Prince Daniel of Moscow III degree (2009, ROC);
- Order of the Friendship of Peoples (Belarus, 9 December 2009) — for significant personal contribution to strengthening peace, friendly relations and cooperation between the Republic of Belarus and the Russian Federation;
- Certificate of honor The Collective Security Council of the Collective Security Treaty Organization (20 December 2011) — for active and productive work on the development and deepening of military-political cooperation within the framework of Collective Security Treaty Organization;
- Honor «Registered firearms» (Ukraine, 4 January 2012).

== See also ==
- Union Shield – 2011

Political offices
Preceded by Sergei Ivanov	Minister of Defence of Russian Federation; 2007–2012	Succeeded by Sergey Shoygu
