= Mikhail Mishustin =

Prime Minister of Russia since 2020

- Михаил Мишустин
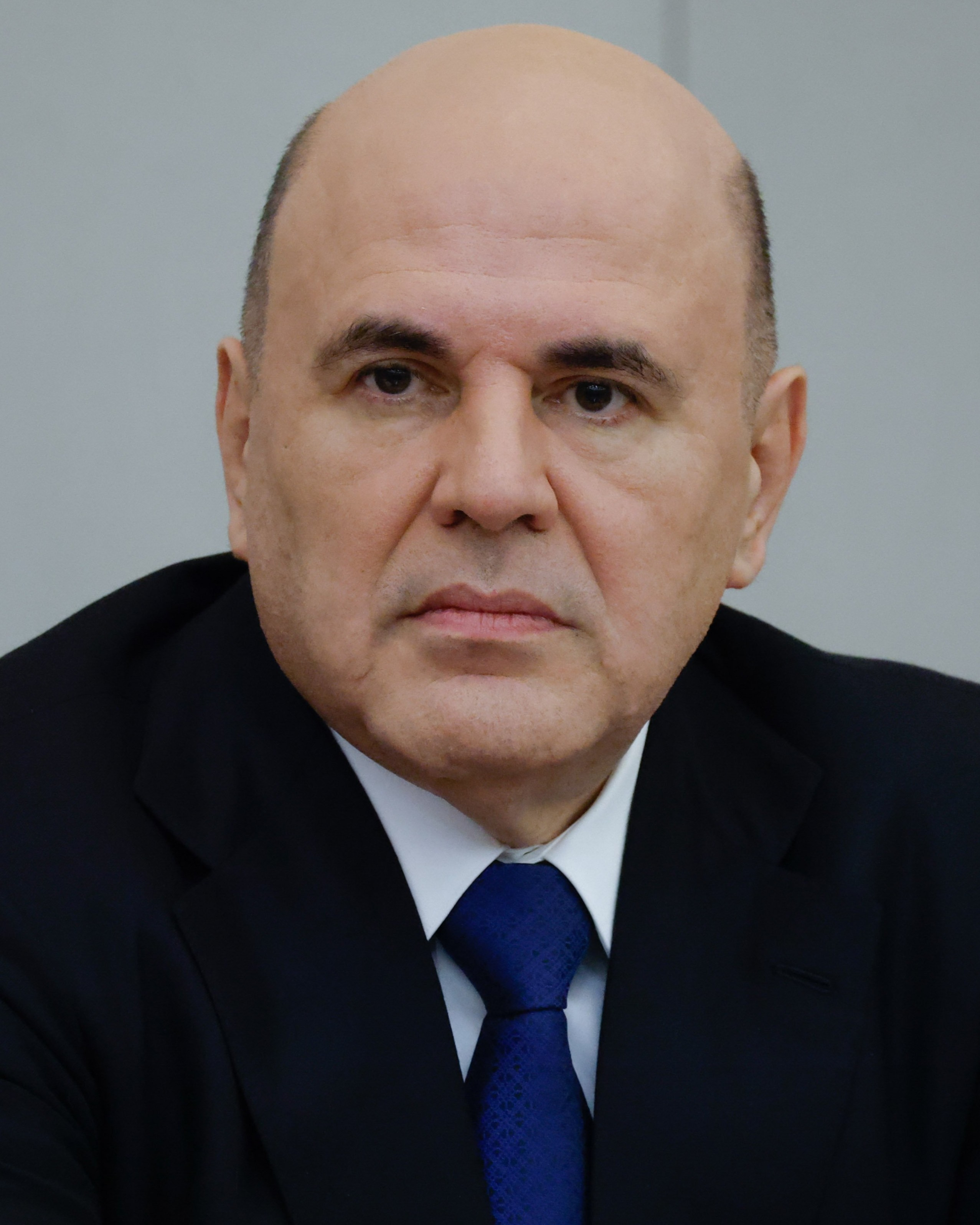
- Mishustin in 2026

Prime Minister of Russia
- Incumbent
- Assumed office 16 January 2020
- President: Vladimir Putin
- First Deputy: Andrey Belousov (Note: Belousov also served as Acting Prime Minister from 30 April to 19 May 2020 in connection with Mikhail Mishustin being diagnosed with COVID-19); Denis Manturov
- Preceded by: Dmitry Medvedev

Chairman of the Council of Ministers of the Union State
- Incumbent
- Assumed office 16 January 2020
- Secretary General: Grigory Rapota; Dmitry Mezentsev
- Preceded by: Dmitry Medvedev

Head of the Special Coordinating Council for Security Enhancement
- Incumbent
- Assumed office 19 October 2022
- President: Vladimir Putin
- Preceded by: Office established

Director of the Federal Taxation Service
- In office 6 April 2010 – 16 January 2020
- Prime Minister: Vladimir Putin; Dmitry Medvedev
- Preceded by: Mikhail Mokretsov
- Succeeded by: Daniil Yegorov

Personal details
- Born: 3 March 1966 (age 60) Lobnya, Moscow Oblast, Soviet Union
- Party: Independent
- Spouse: Vladlena Razinova
- Children: 3
- Education: STANKIN
- Occupation: Politician; businessman; economist
- Profession: Engineer
- Website: premier.gov.ru

Military service
- Allegiance: Russia
- Branch/service: Tax police
- Years of service: 1998–2008; 2010–2020
- Rank: Acting State Councillor of the Russian Federation, 1st class
- Mishustin's voice Recorded 22 September 2023

Mikhail Vladimirovich Mishustin (Note: In this name that follows East Slavic naming customs, the patronymic is Vladimirovich and the family name is Mishustin.) (Note: Russian: Михаил Владимирович Мишустин, IPA: [mʲɪxɐˈil vlɐˈdʲimʲɪrəvʲɪtɕ mʲɪˈʂusʲtʲɪn]) (born 3 March 1966) is a Russian politician and economist serving as the prime minister of Russia since 2020. He previously served as the director of the Federal Taxation Service from 2010 to 2020.

President Vladimir Putin nominated Mishustin to become prime minister on 15 January 2020, following the resignation of Dmitry Medvedev and the rest of the government to allow for sweeping constitutional changes. Hearings on his appointment took place in the State Duma on 16 January, and he was confirmed in office that day.

Mishustin has the federal state civilian service rank of 1st class Active State Councillor of the Russian Federation.

== Early life and education ==
Mikhail Mishustin was born on 3 March 1966 in Lobnya, a town very close to Moscow, to the Mishustin family, Vladimir Moiseyevich and Luiza Mikhailovna. His mother was born in the city of Kotlas in the Arkhangelsk region while Mishustin's father was born in Polotsk. Vladimir Moiseyevich Mishustin was a member of the Central Committee of the Komsomol.

In 1989, he graduated from the STANKIN, majoring in system engineering, and in 1992, he completed postgraduate studies at the same institute.

In 2003, Mikhail Mishustin completed a PhD in Economics at the Plekhanov University. In 2010, Mishustin received a DSc in Economics from the Presidential Academy of National Economy and Public Administration.

== Entrepreneurship ==
=== Early career (before 1998) ===
After finishing graduate school, he began working as a director of a test laboratory facility. In 1992, Mishustin began working at the International Computer Club (ICC), where he worked on facilitating the integration of Russian and Western information technologies. He ultimately headed the board of the International Computer Club.

=== Between jobs in the state service (2008–2010) ===
In 2008, Mishustin left the civil service and returned to the private sector. He spent two years as the president of UFG Asset Management, an investment fund, before resigning to become head of the Federal Tax Service.

In February 2009, he joined the personnel reserve of the President of Russia.

== Early career in state service (1998–2008) ==
=== Deputy head of taxation authorities (1998–2004) ===
In 1998, Mikhail Mishustin joined the state service as an assistant for information systems for accounting and control over the receipt of tax payments to the Head of the State Tax Service of Russia. In the same year, he became deputy head of the Service, and after the transformation of the Service into the Ministry, Mishustin became Deputy Minister of Taxes and Duties. Until 2004, he worked as Deputy minister, being second-in-command at the State Tax Service. He worked as head of the Federal Agency for Real Estate Cadastre within the Russian Ministry of Economic Development, and head of the Federal Agency for Managing Special Economic Zones.

=== Head of the Federal Agency for Real Estate Cadastre (2004–2006) ===
In 2004, by order of then Prime Minister Mikhail Fradkov, Mishustin headed the Federal Agency for Real Estate Cadastre (Rosnedvizhimost), which was subordinate to the Ministry of Economic Development and Trade of Russia.

Mikhail Mishustin was faced with the task of developing and implementing a real estate cadastre and its valuation. In two years, Rosnedvizhimost completed a massive cadastral assessment of land, which made it possible to introduce a land tax based on the cadastral (before that, normative) the value of the land. Also in 2005, Rosnedvizhimost announced its intention to begin disclosing cadastral valuation data on privately owned land plots via the Internet.

=== Head of Federal Agency for the Management of Special Economic Zones (2006–2008) ===
In December 2006, Mishustin, by order of the Prime Minister, took the position of head of the Federal Agency for the Management of Special Economic Zones (RosOEZ), also subordinate to the Ministry of Economic Development and Trade.

During Mishustin's two years as head of the Agency, the first two industrial and production special economic zones were opened in Tatarstan (Alabuga) and Lipetsk, as well as the first technical and innovation special economic zones in Dubna, Moscow Oblast, Tomsk and Zelenograd. A system of providing state and municipal services based on the single-window system was developed and began to be implemented in the special economic zones.

In February 2008, Mishustin left the state service.

== Director of the Federal Taxation Service (2010–2020) ==
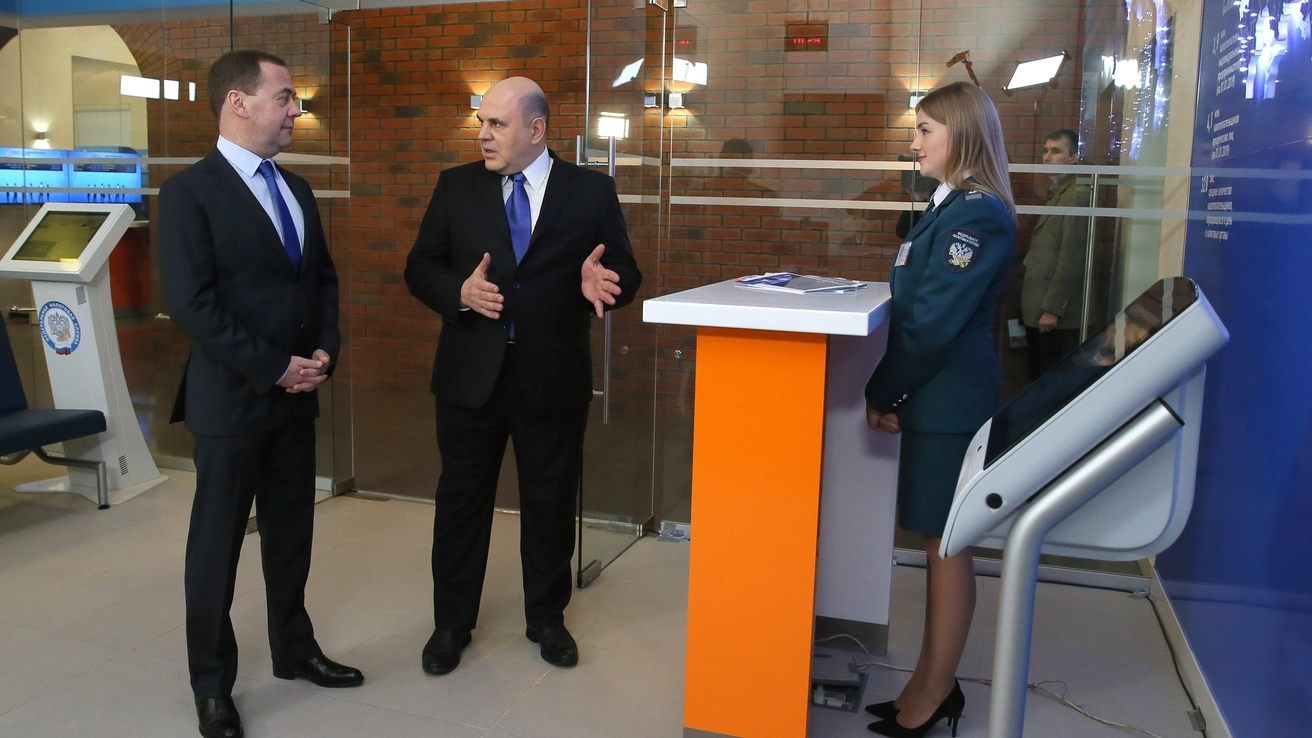
Mishustin with Prime Minister Dmitry Medvedev in FTS office on 13 February 2019

In 2010, Mishustin return to the state service. He was appointed head of the Federal Tax Service (FTS) by then–Prime Minister Vladimir Putin. After his appointment to this post, entrepreneurs expressed the hope that Mishustin, as coming from business, would be more "friendly" to Russian entrepreneurs. As head of the Federal Tax Service, Mishustin earned a reputation as a skilled technocrat and emphasized tax simplification and electronic tax services. During this period, however, the tax service was criticized for its overly strict approach to business; Mishustin rejected this criticism, pointing to a decrease in the number of on-site tax audits and tax inspections of large and medium-sized businesses.

As head of the FTS, Mishustin declared war on "dirty data" and targeted problems with unjustified value-added tax (VAT) refunds. Mishustin emphasized digitization and big data, making extensive use of "techno-authoritarian" systems of government surveillance of economic activity, including the collection of data on almost every transaction in Russia. This data collection was facilitated by new legislation that required all business-to-business invoices to be submitted to the government and required all retailers to automatically transmit real-time transaction data to tax authorities through an "online cash register" process. The government used artificial intelligence to identify persons suspected of tax evasion. This system of surveillance resulted in a decrease in the share of VAT uncollected by Russian authorities during Mishustin's tenure; the "VAT gap" reportedly declined from 20% to less than 1%.

== Prime Minister (2020–present) ==
=== First term (2020–2024) ===
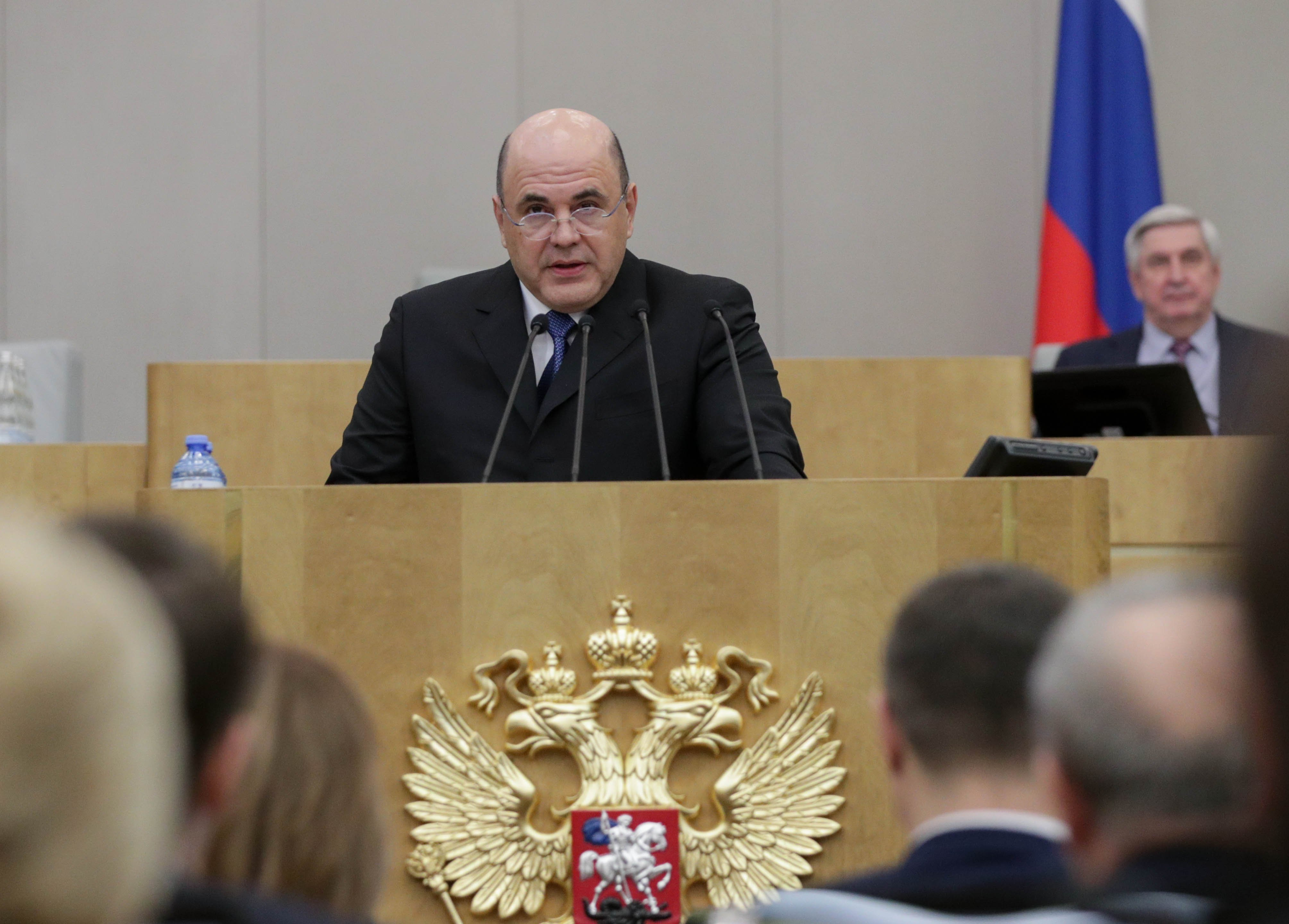
Mishustin at his confirmation hearing at the State Duma on 16 January 2020

Prime Minister Dmitry Medvedev, along with his entire Cabinet, resigned on 15 January 2020, after President Vladimir Putin delivered the Presidential Address to the Federal Assembly, in which he proposed several amendments to the constitution. Medvedev stated that he was resigning to allow Putin to make the significant constitutional changes suggested by Putin regarding shifting power away from the presidency. Putin accepted the resignation. However, on Putin's instructions, the Cabinet continued its work as a caretaker cabinet until the formation of a new government.

On 15 January 2020, Putin nominated Mishustin for the post of prime minister. According to Putin, he was offered four candidates, but Mishustin was not among them. As a result, Putin independently decided to nominate Mishustin for the prime minister. The next day he was confirmed by the State Duma to the post and appointed prime minister by Putin's decree. This was the first time ever that a prime minister was confirmed without any votes against.

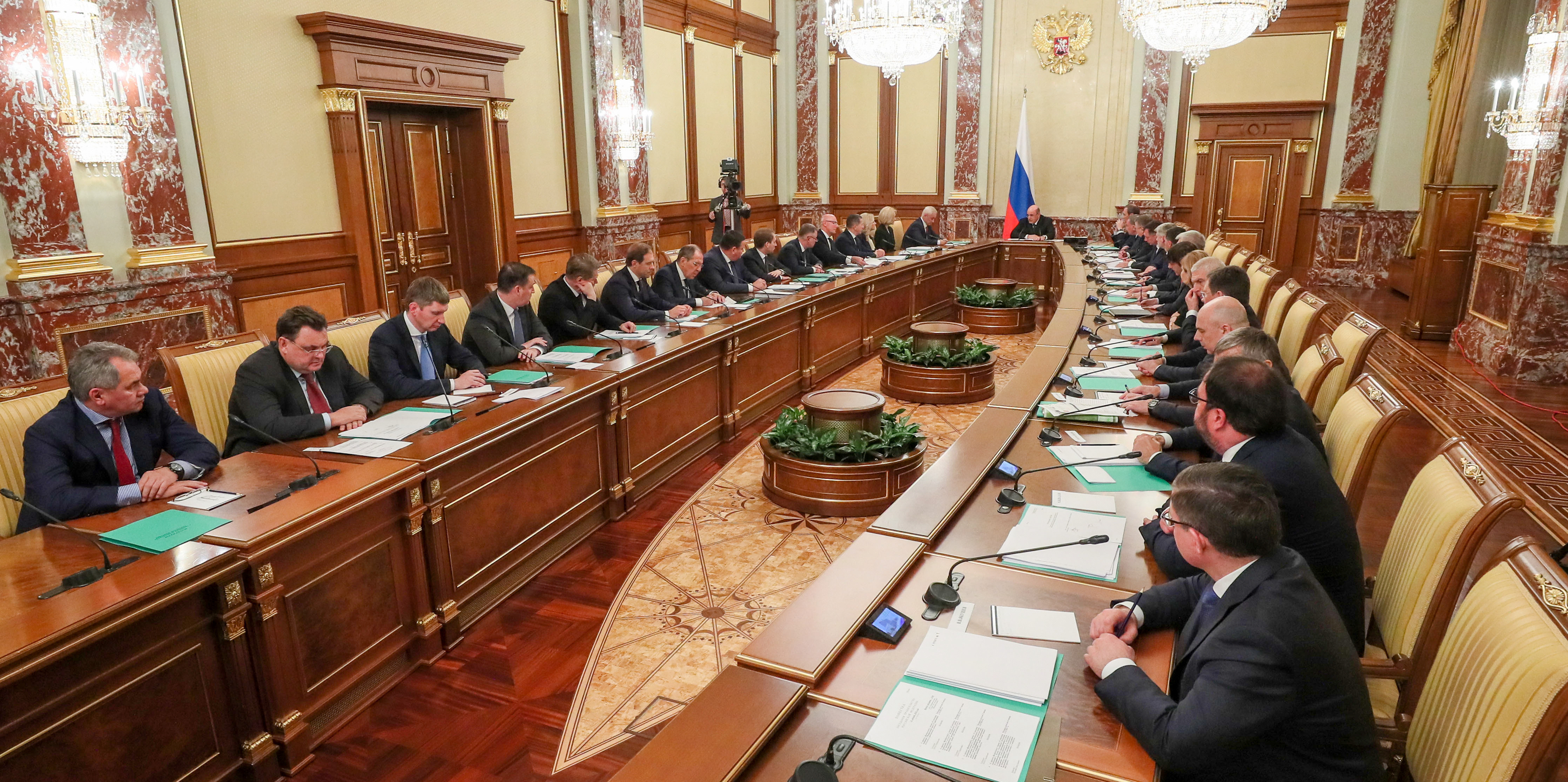
Meeting of the Mishustin's First Cabinet on 21 January 2020

On 21 January 2020, Mishustin presented to President Vladimir Putin a draft structure of his Cabinet. On the same day, the President signed a decree on the structure of the Cabinet and appointed the proposed Ministers.

The cabinet contained multiple members from Medvedev's Second Cabinet. Only four Deputy Prime Ministers remained (three retaining their positions and one being appointed to another post), along with twelve Ministers.

According to many political analysts, Mishustin is the only one of Putin's Prime Ministers who truly formed his "own" cabinet. He gathered a team of his own people and associates. Before that, in the 21st century, only Putin was able to do this. In particular, two Deputy Prime Ministers were deputies of Mishustin in the Federal Tax Service. According to experts, this means that Mishustin has been given carte blanche for changes.

On 26 March 2020, Mishustin proposed to restore the Government's Presidium, a body in the structure of the Cabinet formed to solve operational issues. Previously, such a body existed in Medvedev's First Cabinet, but had been abolished in Medvedev's Second Cabinet.

The Cabinet resigned on 7 May 2024 after the inauguration of Vladimir Putin. However on Putin's instructions the Cabinet continued its work as a caretaker cabinet.

=== Term ===
Mishustin cut the Federal budget for 2020 to 2022, in correspondence to the 2020 Presidential Address to the Parliament. Mishustin engaged in the digital economy and promised support to large companies. He also suggested creating a common electronic income database for Russians, where all citizens' incomes will be tracked.

Since February 2020, Mishustin has started traveling around the country to make a real assessment of living conditions in various regions and identify issues on which it is necessary to strengthen work. Before the start of the coronavirus pandemic, Mishustin managed to visit four regions: Novgorod, Kurgan, Yaroslavl and Kostroma oblasts. In July 2020, after a decline in the active spread of the virus and the lifting of restrictions related to the pandemic, Mishustin resumed his trips, visiting Tatarstan.

==== COVID-19 pandemic ====
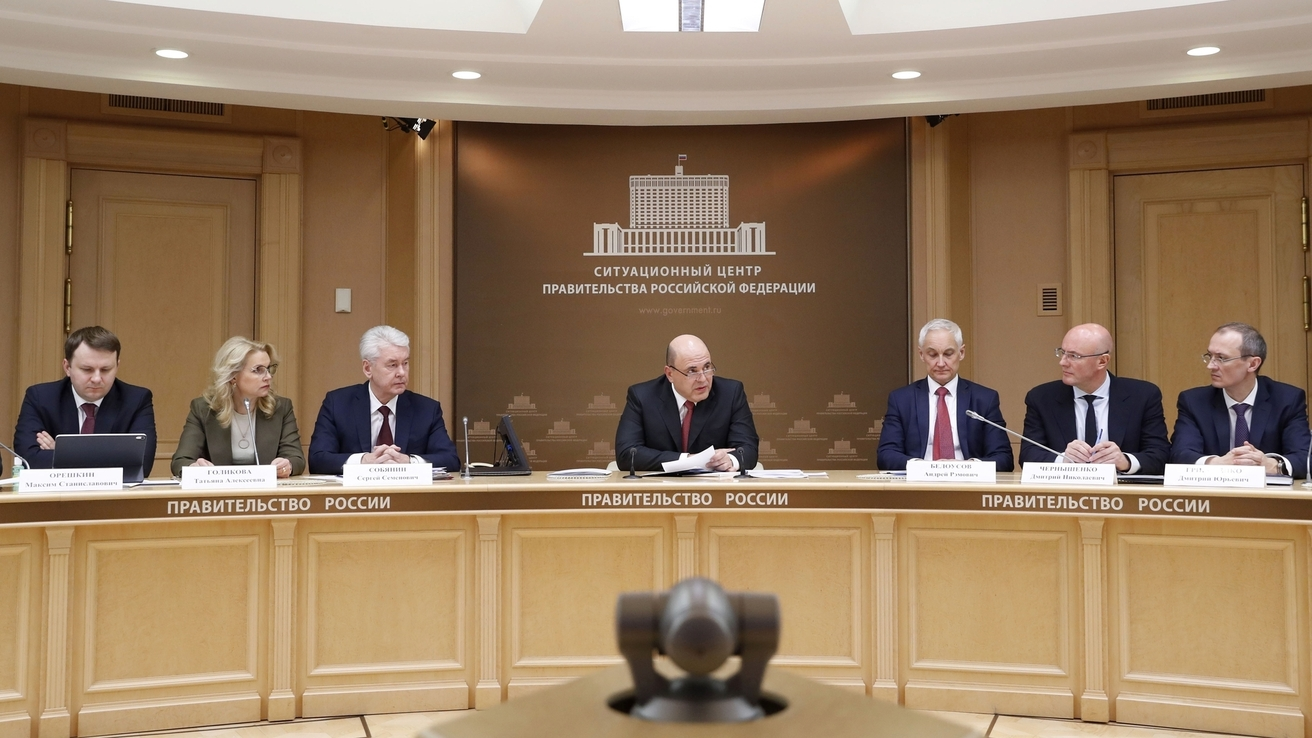
Meeting of the Government Coordination Council to control the incidence of coronavirus on 16 March 2020

On 27 January 2020, Mishustin instructed the formation of an operational headquarters for the prevention of COVID-19 and on 29 January, approved its composition. Deputy Prime Minister Tatyana Golikova was appointed its chief. On 30 January, he signed an order to close the borders with China in the Russian Far East. On 18 February, Mishustin signed an order banning Chinese citizens from entering Russia. The ban has been in effect since 20 February.

On 14 March, Mishustin created a Coordinating Council for the fight against coronavirus, which he personally headed. The next day, by presidential decree, a working group of the State Council was created, headed by Moscow Mayor Sergey Sobyanin. However, according to Dmitry Peskov, Mishustin's Coordinating Council is more important than Sobyanin's Working Group.

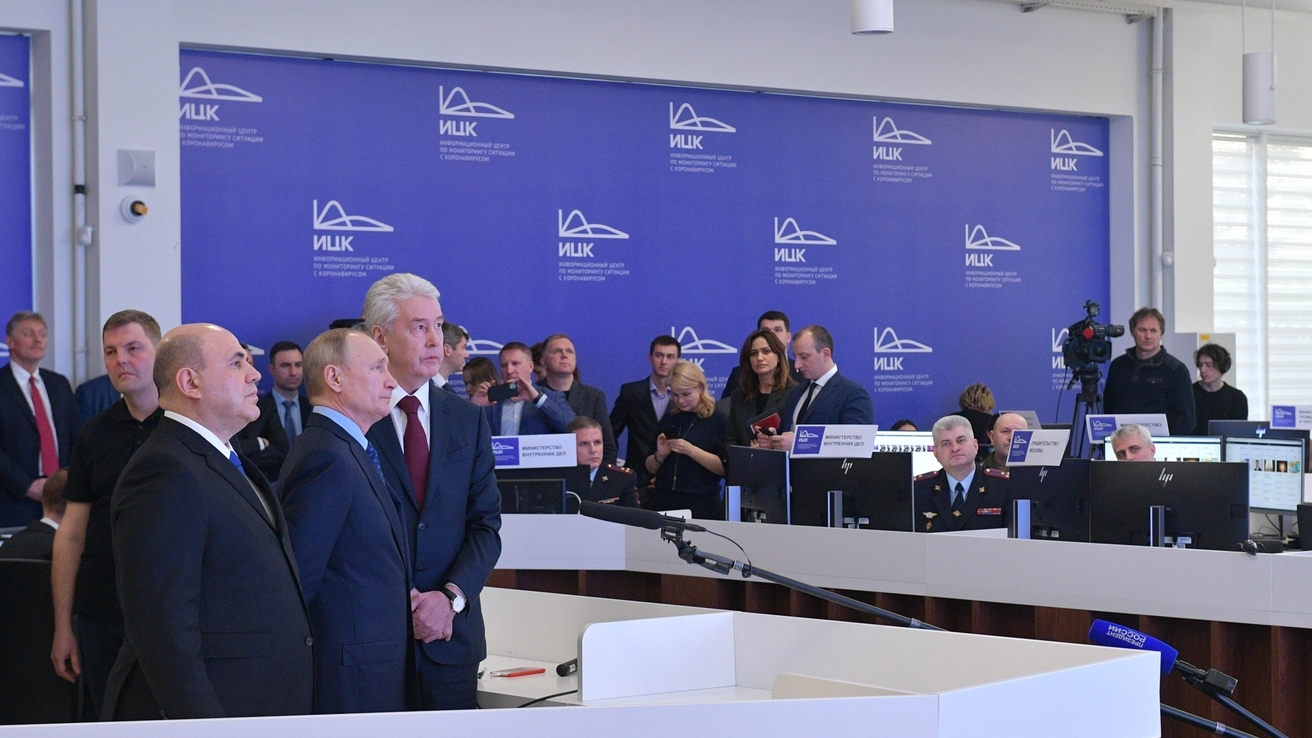
Mishustin, President Putin and Moscow Mayor Sergey Sobyanin at the Coronavirus Monitoring Center on 17 March 2020

Since 16 March 2020, flights to and from the European Union, Norway and Switzerland are limited to regular flights between capital cities (or Geneva in case of Switzerland) and Moscow Sheremetyevo Airport, and charter flights. Mishustin furthermore announced the closure of the border with Belarus for the movement of people, for which he was criticized by Belarusian President Alexander Lukashenko, and an entry ban for foreigners imposed from 18 March to 1 May. In addition, borders with other countries bordering Russia were also closed.

On 18 and 19 March, Mishustin announced measures to support business. In particular, he instructed to defer the payment of taxes for travel agencies and airlines, as well as to defer insurance premiums for small businesses. On 19 March, he also announced the government's control over food and drug prices due to the coronavirus. It also temporarily lifted all restrictions on the supply of essential goods. On 20 March, Mishustin proclaimed that flights to the United States, United Kingdom and United Arab Emirates would be restricted. On the same day, Mishustin announced that six drugs for the treatment of COVID-19 had been developed in Russia and were being tested.

On 27 March, as a follow-up to Putin's address to the nation, Mishustin ordered all reservations at pensions or holiday houses to be cancelled from 28 March to 1 June, recommended regional authorities to close all the pistes at resorts for the same period, instructed them to force all the public eating places (except for delivery services) to suspend activities from 28 March to 5 April, and recommend the citizens to refrain from travelling.

On 30 March, as Moscow and Moscow Oblast declared a lockdown, Mishustin urged all regions to follow the example and take similar measures. He also announced a bill that would raise fines for breaching quarantine requirements. On 1 April, Mishustin and the Minister of Communications Maxut Shadayev announced creating a system of tracking quarantine violation based on data of mobile network operators. Violators will receive a text message, and if they breach it systematically, the information will be sent to the police.

After testing positive for COVID-19 on 30 April, he suggested to President Putin that his deputy Andrey Belousov be appointed to take over for him as the acting prime minister. Putin signed a decree to that effect, appointing Belousov to the role on an acting basis, following Mishustin's recommendation. After recovering, Mishustin resumed discharging his duties as prime minister on 19 May, following Putin signing a decree permitting him to do so. He was the highest-ranking Russian official and the second head of government in the world (after British PM Boris Johnson) to become infected with the virus.

===== Economic recovery plan =====
On 1 June 2020, Mishustin announced that a national plan to restore the economy, employment and income of the population after the coronavirus pandemic was ready and on 2 June he presented the plan to President Putin. The plan included 3 stages, 9 sections, 30 priority areas and about 500 events. According to the plan, the recovery of the economy was given one and a half years – until the end of 2021. The goals of the plan were to achieve sustainable growth in real incomes, reduce the unemployment rate to less than 5%, and ensure that GDP growth rates are at least 2.5% per year.

==== Domestic policy ====
===== IT industry =====
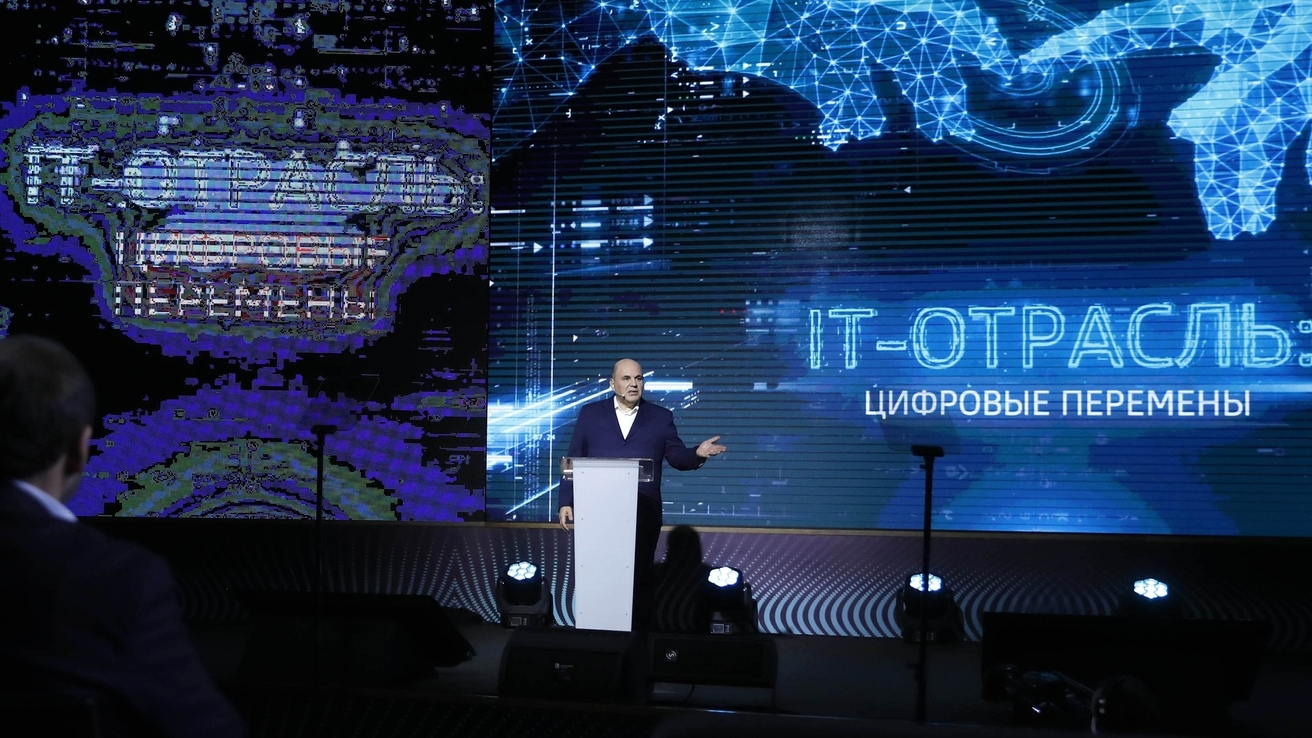
Mishustin at the IT conference in Innopolis on 9 July 2020

In June 2020, Mishustin proposed a tax maneuver for IT companies in order to reduce the load and create a comfortable competitive regime in this area. President Putin supported this idea and instructed the government to work on it. As part of the maneuver, Mishustin proposed to reduce the income tax on IT companies from 20% to 3%, as well as to reduce insurance premiums from 14% to 7.6%. On June 23, Putin officially announced the tax maneuver prepared by Mishustin.

On 9 July 2020, Mishustin visited Tatarstan where he took part in the IT conference, where he met with the managers of the country's leading IT companies. During his speech, Mishustin spoke about the government's program for the development of the IT industry, which includes a new tax regime, support for innovation, assistance to startups, development of public-private partnerships, etc. According to him, the Russian jurisdiction should become the most attractive for IT companies. Mishustin stated: "It is obvious that following the leaders of digitalization leads countries to a new digital dependence. Russia cannot afford to take a place among the dependent countries, which means that we have no choice, we must go forward and be leaders."

===== Transport =====
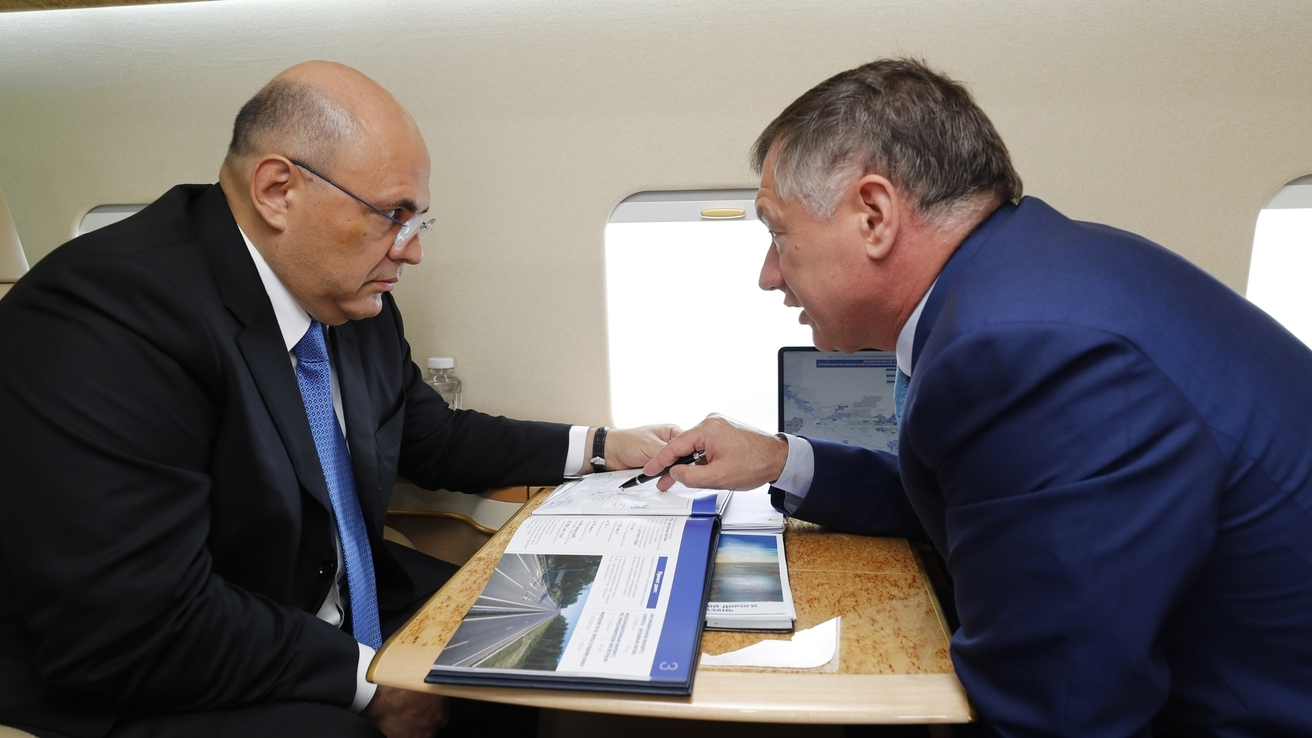
Mishustin and Deputy Prime Minister Marat Khusnullin conduct a helicopter inspection of the construction of the Moscow–Kazan highway on 10 July 2020.

On 10 July 2020, during his trip to Tatarstan, Mishustin launched the construction of the Moscow – Kazan highway, which will become part of the route Europe - Western China. Mishustin called this construction the largest road project in Russia. Given the significance of the project (which is one of the parts of the plan to restore the economy after the coronavirus crisis), Mishustin instructed to launch the highway in 2024, which is three years earlier than originally planned. For this purpose, he promised to allocate additional funds. In addition, he instructed Transport Minister Yevgeny Dietrich to work on the issue of extending the highway to Yekaterinburg by 2030.

===== Administrative reform =====
On 16 November 2020, Mishustin announced an administrative reform aimed at optimizing the state apparatus and its efficiency. As part of the reform, it is planned to reduce the number of civil servants (mainly at the expense of positions that remain vacant), and bring the structure of Federal Executive bodies to uniform standards. It is also planned to reorganize the majority of federal state unitary enterprises. According to the draft, they should be liquidated or transformed into joint-stock companies with further privatization.

On 23 November 2020, Mishustin also announced the optimization of the so-called development institutions (state funds, agencies and companies engaged in stimulating innovation processes using public-private partnership mechanisms). As part of this reform, it is planned to form an investment block based on VEB.RF, with the transfer of a number of the development institutions under its management, as well as the direct transfer of the functions of the abolished institutions to it.

===== Migration policy =====
In October 2023, Mishustin held a strategic session of the Russian Government on migration policy, during which he stated the need to control migration flows in order to ensure security. He called for ensuring an adequate level of control over the stay of migrant workers in Russia and effectively identifying illegal migrants and those who are prone to illegal activities. Also during the session, Mishustin announced plans to introduce an electronic register of migrant workers and their employers.

===== Climate and environment =====
In 2021, Mishustin stated that nature protection is one of the priorities of governmental policy. According to him, emissions of dangerous pollutants are being reduced, landfills are being eliminated, public transport is being converted to alternative fuels, a modern waste recycling infrastructure is being created, and a transition to a closed-loop economy is being ensured.

In February 2022, Mishustin approved the environmental development program until 2030, which provides for the creation of high-tech technological solutions aimed at studying the climate, mechanisms for adaptation to climate change and its consequences, as well as measures to reduce the negative impact of gases on the environment.

==== Foreign policy ====
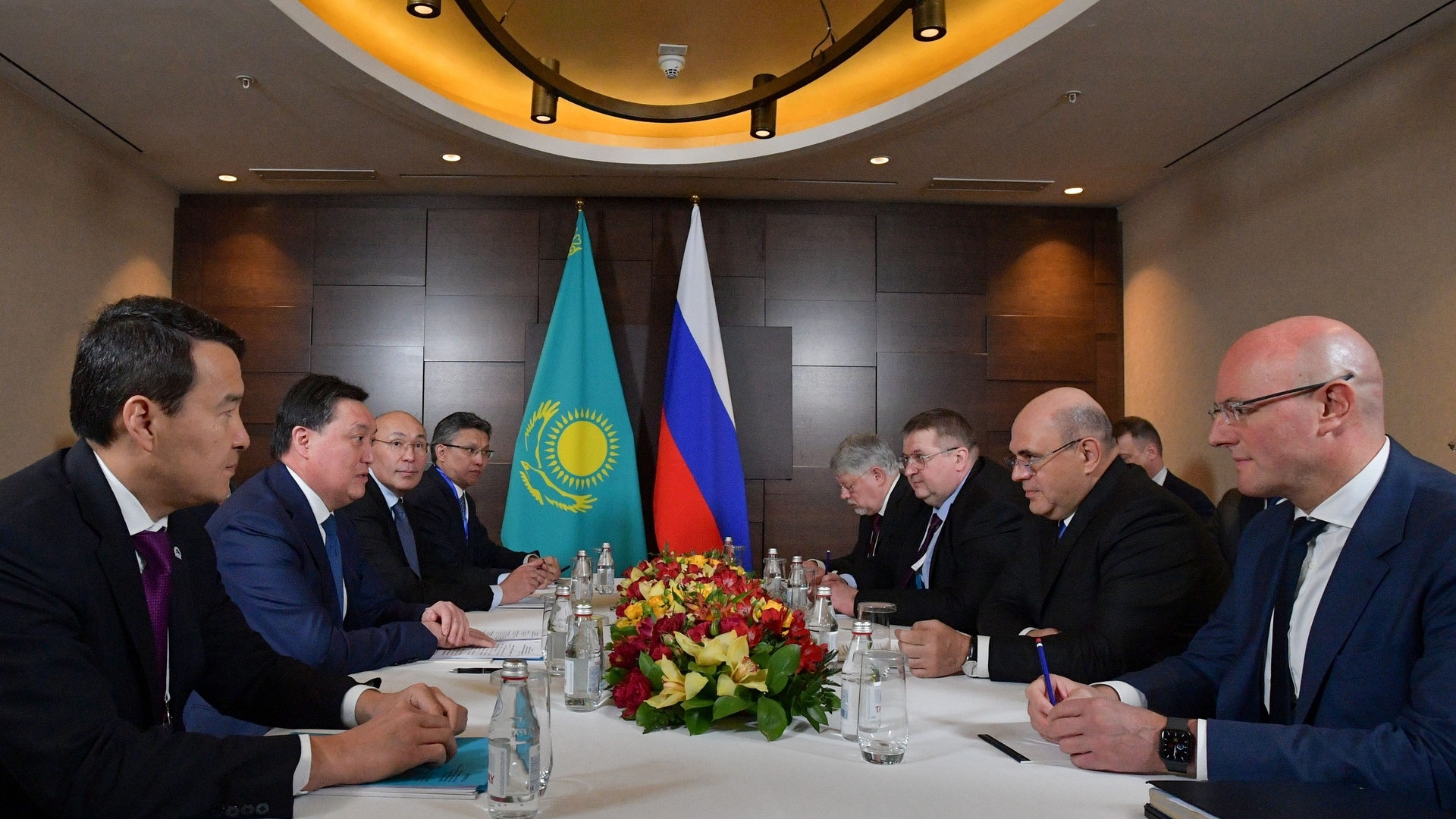
Mishustin with Prime Minister of Kazakhstan Asqar Mamin, on 31 January 2020

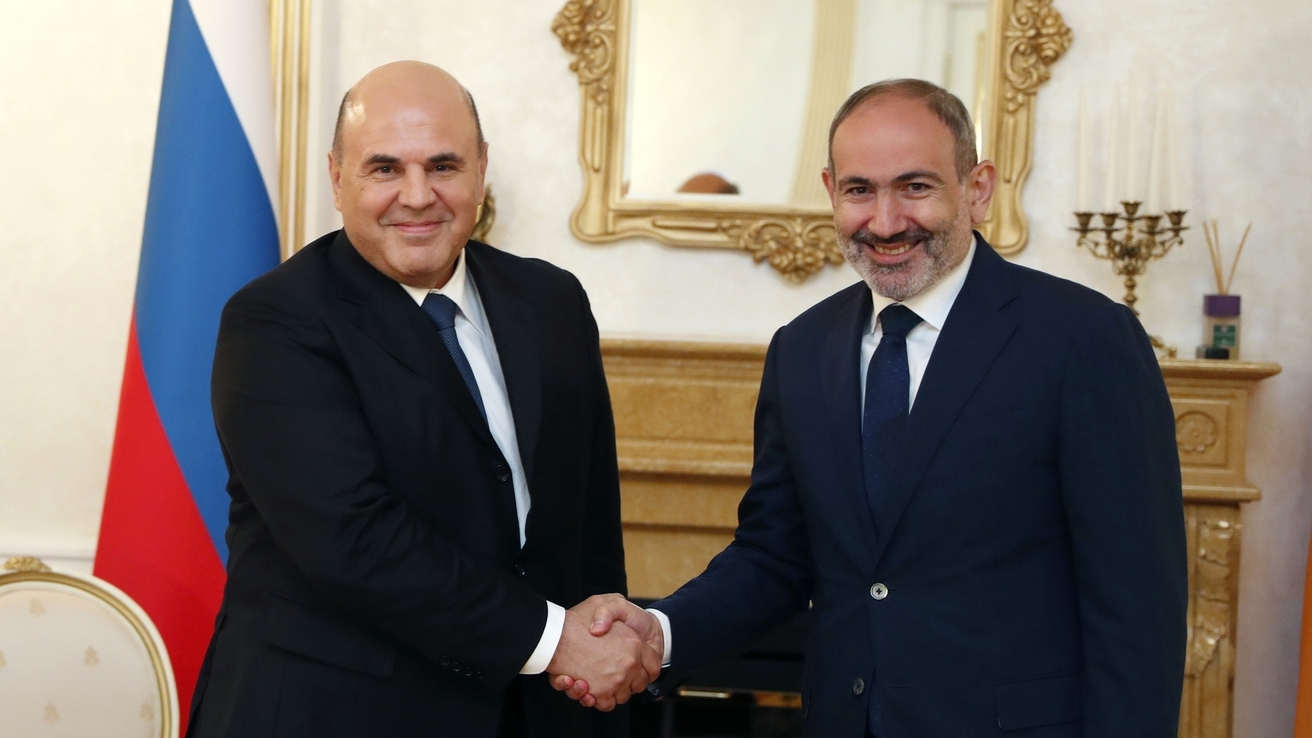
Mishustin with Prime Minister of Armenia Nikol Pashinyan, on 17 July 2020

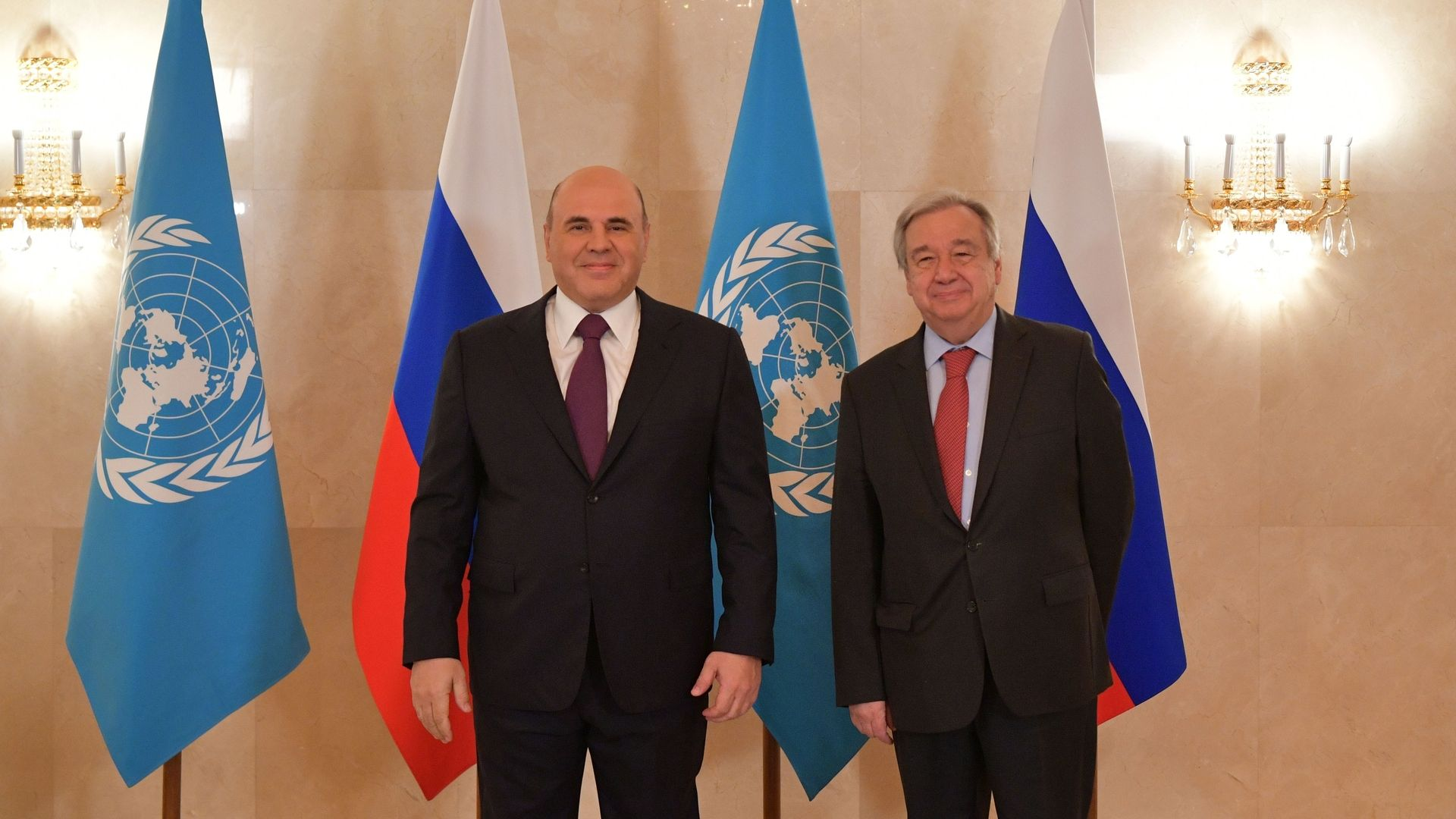
Mishustin with Secretary-General of the UN António Guterres, on 14 May 2021

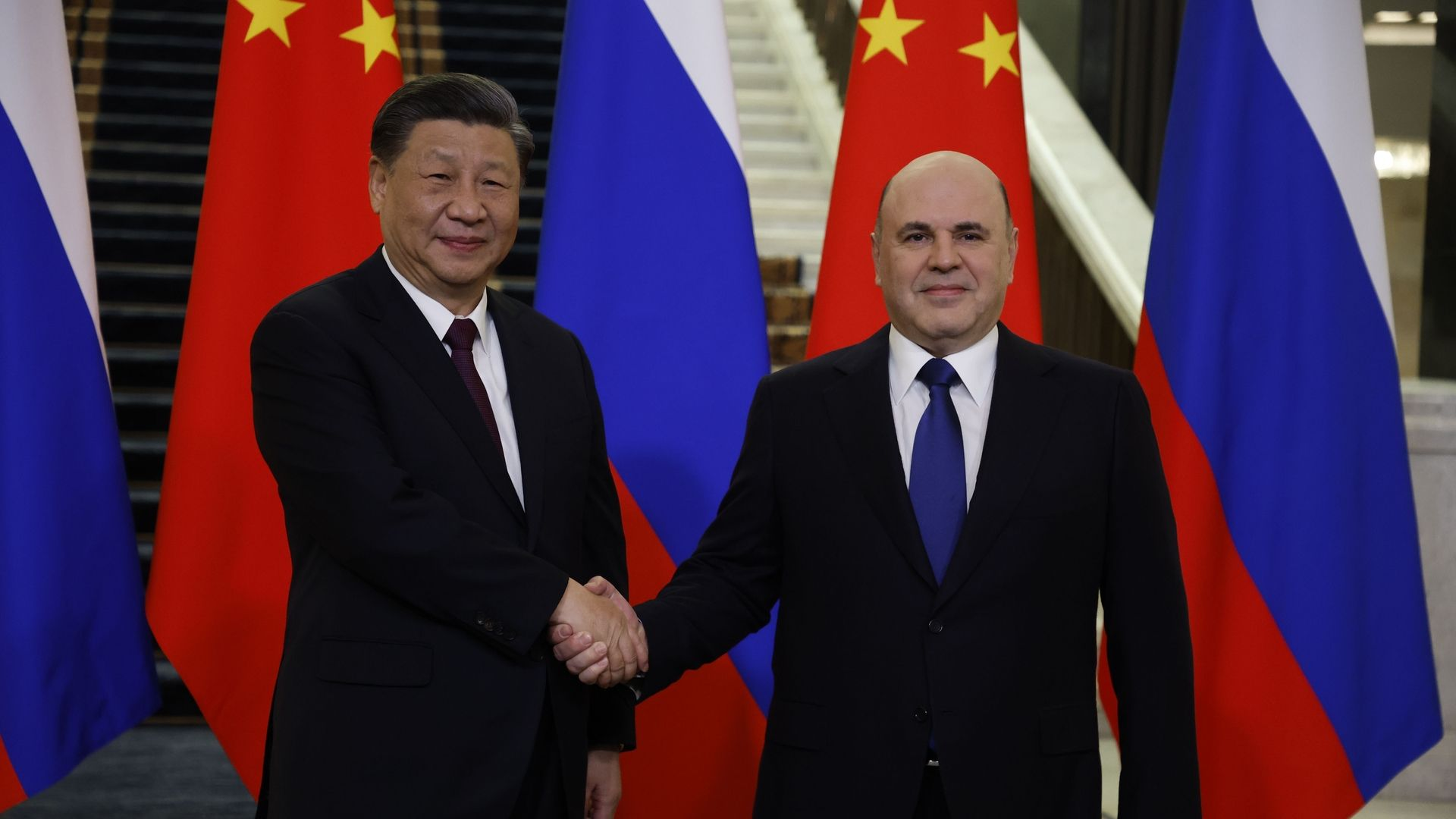
Mishustin with Chinese President Xi Jinping in Moscow, on 21 March 2023

According to the BBC, "Prime Minister Mikhail Mishustin has the unenviable task of rescuing the economy but has little say over" the Russian invasion of Ukraine. According to sources close to the Kremlin, Mishustin was unaware of Putin's plans to launch a full-scale invasion of Ukraine and does not want to be associated with the war.

In May 2023, Mishustin and Deputy Prime Minister Alexander Novak visited Beijing and met with Chinese President Xi Jinping. Mishustin said that "relations between Russia and China are at an unprecedented high level."

In April 2024, Mishustin emphasized the preservation and strengthening of Russia's presence in key regional international organizations such as BRICS and the Shanghai Cooperation Organisation. Mishustin also spoke about his intention to deepen the dialogue with other international organizations that are constructive to Russia. According to him, Russia is working hard to develop cooperation with its strategic partners against the background of unprecedented sanctions from Western countries.

=== Second-term (2024–present) ===
On 7 May 2024 after the Fifth inauguration of Vladimir Putin, Mishustin resigned along with the government. On May 9, 2024, Putin again nominated Mishustin for the post of prime minister. On May 10, the State Duma approved Mishustin as Prime Minister for a second term.

On 11 May 2024, President Vladimir Putin approved the structure of the Cabinet of Ministers. In general, the structure of the Government has remained the same. As in the previous cabinet, the new one will have one First Deputy Prime Minister and 9 Deputy Prime Ministers. Also, the positions of Federal Ministers remained unchanged. At the same time, the post of Minister of Industry and Trade was separated from the post of deputy prime minister. On the same day, Mikhail Mishustin nominated candidates for the positions of Deputy Prime Ministers and Ministers. State Duma approved the candidates for the posts of the First Deputy Prime Minister and Deputy Prime Ministers on 13 May and for the posts of Federal Ministers on 14 May.

On 12 May 2024, President Vladimir Putin nominated candidates for the positions of Ministers of Defense, Foreign Affairs, Internal Affairs, Justice and Emergency Situations. Of the five ministers, four retained their positions. At the same time, former First Deputy Prime Minister Andrey Belousov was nominated for the post of Defence Minister instead Sergey Shoygu, who was appointed new Secretary of the Security Council. Federation Council held relevant consultations on 14 May.

On 14 May 2024, President Vladimir Putin appointed the approved nominees for Deputy Prime Ministers and Federal Ministers.

==== Term ====
In July 2024, Mishustin announced the signing of a concession agreement that will launch the construction of the Moscow–Saint Petersburg high-speed railway.

In November 2024, Mishustin took part in the Russian Transport Forum. During his speech at the forum, Mishustin spoke about plans to increase the intensity of flights in Russia by 1.5 times over the next six years. According to him, to ensure such growth, it is planned to modernize more than a third of the airport infrastructure in the country.

In November 2024, Mishustin participated in the 2024 United Nations Climate Change Conference in Baku, Azerbaijan. During his speech at the conference session, Mishustin said that Russia has managed to reduce greenhouse gas emissions by more than half compared to 1990 levels. According to him, by 2060, Russia is planning to become carbon neutral, with an emphasis on improving energy efficiency, developing electric transport, and introducing modern solutions to agriculture and forestry. According to Mishustin, in Russia, 85% of the energy balance is accounted for by clean, low-emission generation. These are primarily gas, nuclear and renewable energy sources.

In May 2025, Mishustin was tasked by the State Duma's Deputy Speaker Victoria Abramchenko with solving the over-capacity problems of Rostselmash, which is the largest manufacturer of farm machinery in Russia. Some 15,000 people are employed there, and it had trouble selling its machines in 2025.

=== Confirmation votes ===
State Duma confirmation
Date	For		Against		Abstaining		Did not vote	
16 January 2020	383	85.1%	0	0.0%	41	9.1%	25	5.6%
16 January 2020	Source: Справка о результатах голосования							
10 May 2024	375	83.3%	0	0.0%	57	12.7%	18	4.0%
10 May 2024	Source: Госдума утвердила кандидатуру Михаила Мишустина на должность премьер-министра							

== International relations ==
=== Sanctions ===
Mishustin is under personal sanctions in the United States, Canada, (Note: Pursuant to the Special Economic Measures Act (S.C. 1992, c. 17) for Grave Breach of International Peace and Security)) the European Union, the United Kingdom, Switzerland and New Zealand due to the Russian invasion of Ukraine.

=== Media coverage ===
In 2025, Israeli newspaper The Jerusalem Post included Mishustin on their list of "50 Most Influential Jews", ranked 18th. His ranking was headline news on the Ukrainian news website Glavcom.

== Personal life ==
Mishustin is married to Vladlena Razinova, and has three sons. He plays ice hockey. He is also an avid spectator of the sport, and is a member of the supervisory board of HC CSKA Moscow. It has been reported that, prior to his selection as prime minister, he and Putin developed a rapport with each other through their shared enthusiasm for the sport. Mishustin is an amateur musician, and is a pianist. As a hobby he has written pop music, including for the singer Grigory Leps.

On 30 April 2020, Mishustin tested positive for the SARS-CoV-2 virus amidst the COVID-19 pandemic in Russia. He informed President Vladimir Putin of his infection via a video-call. He also stated that he was going into self-quarantine. Putin expressed sympathy and wished him a quick recovery. Mishustin was the first high-ranking Russian official to disclose his coronavirus infection to the public. His diagnosis also made him the most high-profile political figure in Russia to contract the coronavirus.

=== Wealth ===
Mishustin's family owns real estate valued at $48.2 million in the Moscow area. The real estate is held by his father (Vladimir Mishustin), two oldest sons, and sister (Natalya Stenina).

On 16 January 2020, the Russia-based Anti-Corruption Foundation called on Mishustin to explain how his wife earned almost 800 million rubles (nearly £10 million) over 9 years. On 19 January, the Kommersant newspaper published a detailed analysis of all the financial activities of Mishustin, including his leadership of UFG Invest — one of the country's largest investment companies. When switching to the civil service in 2010, Mishustin, in accordance with the law, transferred all his assets and investment projects to his wife. Following the transfer, Vladlena Mishustina began receiving dividends, which is confirmed by official declarations. According to Kommersant, a significant part of the assets were sold in 2013 and 2014, and the proceeds were placed in deposit accounts to receive interest.

Mishustin's sister Natalya Stenina (Russian: Наталья Стенина) was married to Alexander Evgenievich Udodov from 2008 until 18 December 2020. According to Alexei Navalny, Udodov was the beneficial owner of several apartments in the 20 Pine Street building in New York City that were purchased in December 2009 within three weeks of when Denis Katsyv's Prevezon Holdings, which was stolen from Sergei Magnitsky, acquired several properties in the same building near Wall Street in the New York City Financial District. Udodov relinquished control of these properties in 2018.

== Awards ==
- Order of Honour (29 December 2012)
- Russian Federation Presidential Certificate of Honour (15 November 2013)
- Order "For Merit to the Fatherland" (16 July 2015)

=== Foreign ===
- Italy - Knight Grand Cross of the Order of the Star of Italy (28 May 2020, stripped of the award on May 9, 2022 "for unworthiness")
- Greece - Gold Medal of Honour of the City of Athens (25 March 2021)
- Belarus - Order of the Friendship of Peoples (28 August 2026)

=== Ecclesiastical ===
- Patriarchal Badge of the Temple Builder (25 June 2017)
- Order of the Venerable Seraphim of Sarov III degree (28 August 2019)

=== Ranks ===
- Acting State Advisor to the Russian Federation, 1st class (5 December 2010)

== Notes ==
Government offices
Government offices
Preceded by Mikhail Mokretsov	Director of the Federal Tax Service; 2010–2020	Succeeded by Daniil Yegorov
Political offices
Preceded by Dmitry Medvedev	Prime Minister of Russia; 2020–present	Incumbent
Diplomatic posts
Preceded by Dmitry Medvedev	Chairman of the Council of Ministers of the Union State; 2020–present	Incumbent
