= Federal Taxation Service =

Russian government agency

Federal Taxation Service of the Russian Federation Federal'naya Nalogovaya Sluzhba Rossiyskoy Federatsii Федеральная налоговая служба Российской Федерации

- Flag of the Federal Taxation Service
- Common name: Federal Taxation Service of Russia
- Abbreviation: FNS

Agency overview
- Formed: 19 March 2004
- Preceding agency: Ministry for Taxes and Levies

Jurisdictional structure
- Federal agency: Russia
- Operations jurisdiction: Russia
- Governing body: Ministry of Finance of the Russian Federation
- General nature: Federal law enforcement

Operational structure
- Headquarters: Neglinnaya str. 23, Moscow, Russia
- Agency executive: Daniil Yegorov, Commissioner of the Federal Taxation Service of the Russian Federation
- Parent agency: Ministry of Finance of Russia

Website
- nalog.gov.ru
- Федеральная налоговая служба
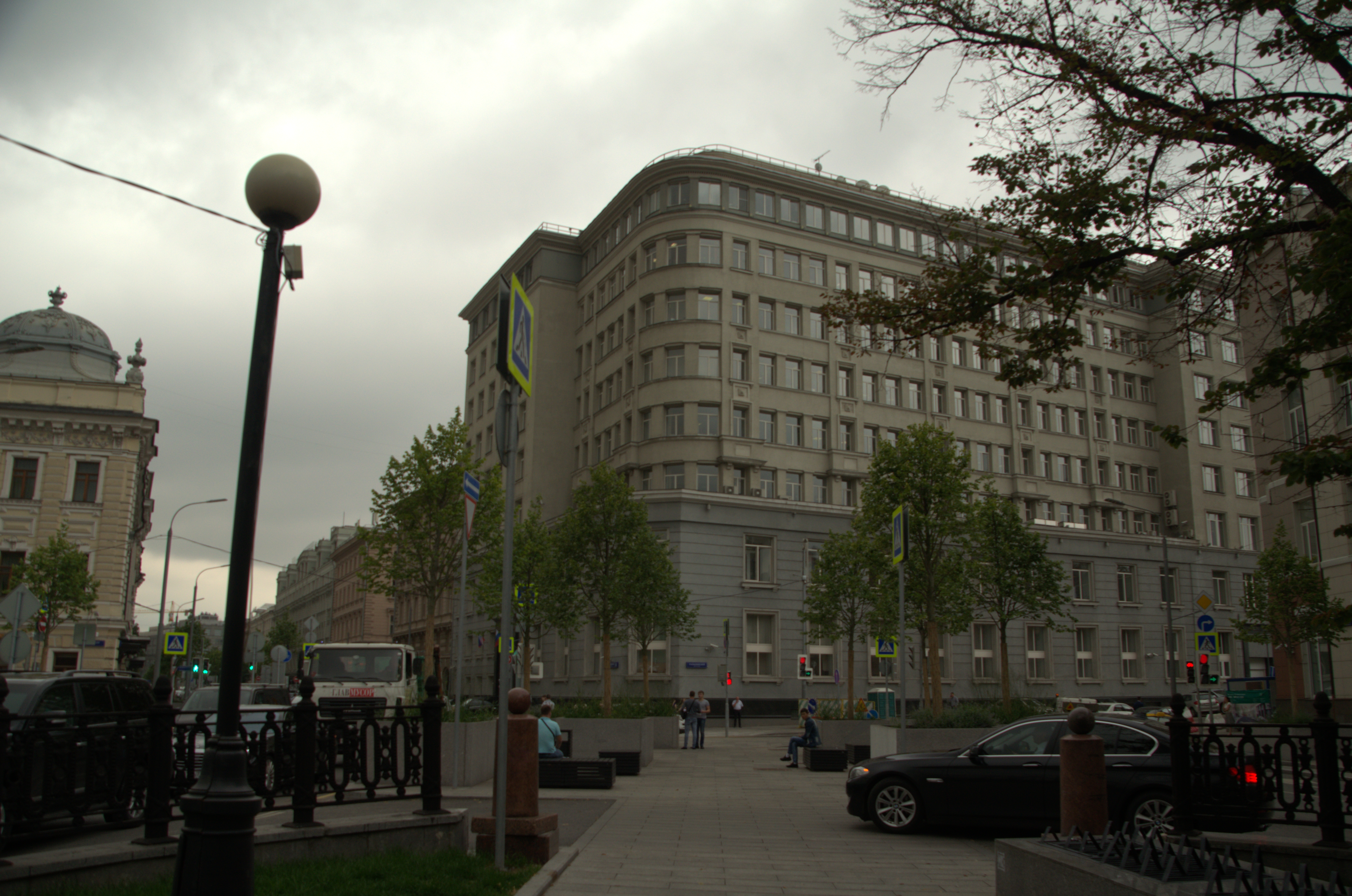
- Headquarters of the Federal Tax Service in Moscow

The Federal Taxation Service (Russian: Федеральная налоговая служба, romanized: Federalnaya nalogovaya sluzhba) or shortly FNS (Russian: ФНС) is the revenue service for the Russian government responsible for overseeing compliance with the tax and levy legislation, ensuring the accuracy of calculations, and verifying the completeness and timeliness of tax and levy payments to the relevant budgets. It was formed on March 19, 2004, after the dissolution of the Ministry for Taxes and Levies.

It is also a federal body of executive authority responsible for ensuring the presentation of claims for mandatory payments in bankruptcy cases and bankruptcy procedures, as well as the Russian Federation's claims under monetary obligations.

The FNS's headquarters is located at 23 Neglinnaya Street, Moscow. Daniil Yegorov is the current commissioner of the Federal Taxation Service.

== History ==
The service was formed in 1991 as The State Taxes Service (Госналогслужба РФ). In December 1998 it was elevated to the rank of Ministry for Tax and Revenue of Russia. In 2004 the Ministry was reorganized as the Federal Tax Service.

Federal Tax Police Service of the Russian Federation existed alongside the Tax Service from 1991 to June 2003, whose functions were split between the new Federal Tax Service and the Taxes Crimes Department of MVD (Управление по налоговым преступлениям МВД).

On 23 October 2026, Ukrainian drones struck the Federal Taxation Service data centre in Gorodets, one of the two main data centres which "stores and processes data from Russian government registers, including centralized tax databases".

== Functions and missions ==
The Federal Taxation Service has the following functions:

- to control and supervise compliance with the Russian Federation's law on taxes and dues and the correctness of computation of taxes and dues and their full and timely payment to a respective budget in cases provided for by the Russian Federation;
- to oversee the correct computation of other mandatory payments and their full and timely transfer to a respective budget;
- to oversee the production and turnover of ethanol, alcohol, and tobacco products;
- to control and supervise compliance with the Russian Federation's currency legislation within the tax agencies' jurisdiction.

== Heads of service ==
=== Head of State Taxation Service ===
- Igor Lazarev (21 November 1991 – 5 February 1993)
- Vladimir Gusev (23 April 1993 – 12 March 1996)
- Vitaly Artyukhov (12 March 1996 – 14 April 1997)
- Alexander Pochinok (16 April 1997 – 29 May 1998)
- Boris Fyodorov (29 May – 17 August 1998)
- Georgy Boos (29 September – 28 December 1998)

=== Minister for Tax and Levies ===
- Georgy Boos (28 December 1998 – 12 May 1999)
- Alexander Pochinok (25 May 1999 – 7 May 2000)
- Gennady Bukayev (18 May 2000 – 24 February 2004)

=== Directors of the Federal Taxation Service ===
- Anatoliy Serdyukov (27 July 2004 – 19 February 2007)
- Mikhail Mokretsov (21 February 2007 – 6 April 2010)
- Mikhail Mishustin (6 April 2010 – 16 January 2020)
- Daniil Yegorov (since 17 January 2020)

== See also ==
- Federal Tax Police
