= 2020 Presidential Address to the Federal Assembly =

2020 speech by Vladimir Putin

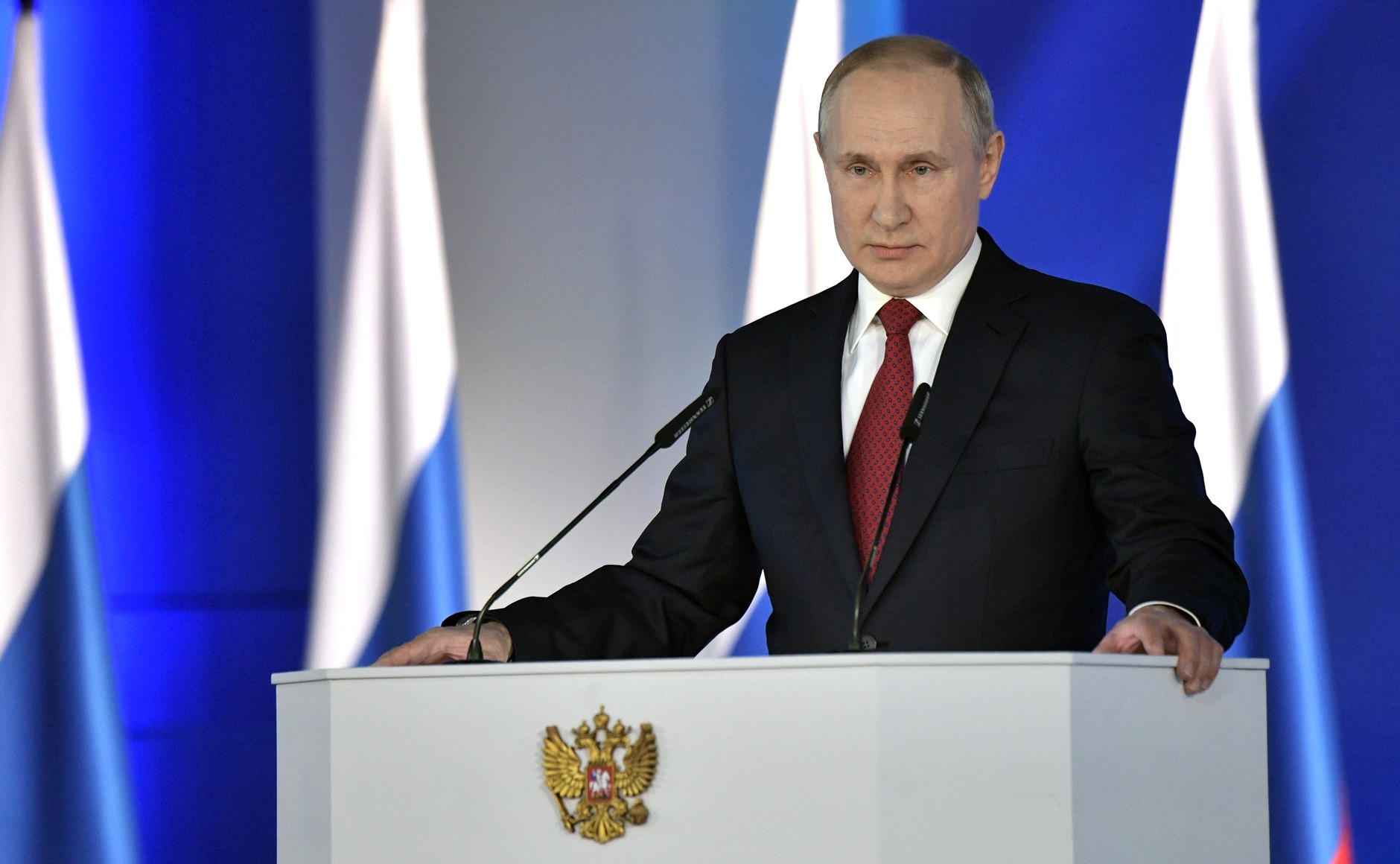
- President Vladimir Putin during the speech.
- Date: January 15, 2020
- Venue: Moscow Manege
- Location: Moscow, Russia
- Type: Presidential Address to the Federal Assembly
- Participants: Vladimir Putin

The 2020 Presidential Address to the Federal Assembly was given by the President of Russia, Vladimir Putin, on Wednesday, January 15, 2020, in the Moscow Manege.

Putin devoted his speech to issues on demography, economics, medicine, and education. The key topic of the speech was the announcement of amendments to the Constitution, which would be proposed via a referendum.

== Main topics ==
=== Support for families with children and demography ===
Vladimir Putin proposed to provide monthly payments for children aged 3 to 7 years inclusive. Families whose incomes do not exceed one living wage per person will be able to receive payments.

Putin also proposed extending the maternity capital payment program (a one-time payment for the birth of a second child) until December 2026 and extending it already for the birth of the first child, as well as increasing the amount for the birth of the second by another 150,000 rubles (about $2,300). After this reform, families will be paid 460,000 rubles (about $7,150) for the birth of the first child, and 616,000 rubles (about $9,600) for the birth of the second. Putin also suggested that families with three children will have their mortgage repaid by the state for up to 450,000 rubles (about $7,000).

According to Putin, such measures should help stimulate the growth of the birth rate in Russia. According to him, by 2024, the country should "not only get out of the demographic trap", but also ensure sustainable natural growth of the population, and the fertility rate should be 1.7.

=== Education ===
Vladimir Putin demanded that all regions provide students from the first to the fourth grade with free and high-quality hot meals, regardless of family income.

Putin proposed to introduce an additional payment to class teachers in the amount of at least 5,000 rubles from the Federal budget (now regional budgets are responsible for this). At the same time, the current regional payments for class leadership should be retained.

Vladimir Putin proposed increasing the number of budget seats every year, especially in regional universities. Putin proposed to change the procedure for admission to universities in medical specialties: in the specialty "Medical care" to make 70% of budget seats targeted, in the specialty Pediatrics — 75%. At the same time, the regions must provide a guarantee of employment for future graduates.

=== Constitutional reform ===
One of the key points of the message to the Federal Assembly was the proposal to introduce a number of amendments to the Constitution that significantly change the balance of power. To introduce these amendments, Putin proposed holding a national referendum.

One of the amendments will concern the formation of the Russian government. At the moment, the government is formed as follows: the president appoints the prime minister after receiving the consent of the State Duma, and then, at the suggestion of the Prime Minister, he appoints his Deputies and Federal Ministers. If the amendments are adopted, the state Duma will appoint the Prime Minister, the State Duma will also give consent to the appointment of Deputy Prime Ministers and Federal Ministers, and the President will not be able to refuse to appoint them.

The next amendment will concern giving the State Council an official status. At the time of address, the State Council is an advisory body and is not mentioned in the Constitution.

Another amendment will tighten the requirements for presidential candidates. After the adoption of the amendment, only persons who have never previously had citizenship or a residence permit of another state, as well as have been permanent residents of Russia for at least 25 years, will be able to become president, instead of the current 10.

Another amendment will oblige the president to consult with the Federation Council when appointing heads of security services and regional prosecutors.

The amendments will also give priority to the Constitution over international law.

== Aftermath ==
=== Resignation of Medvedev's government ===
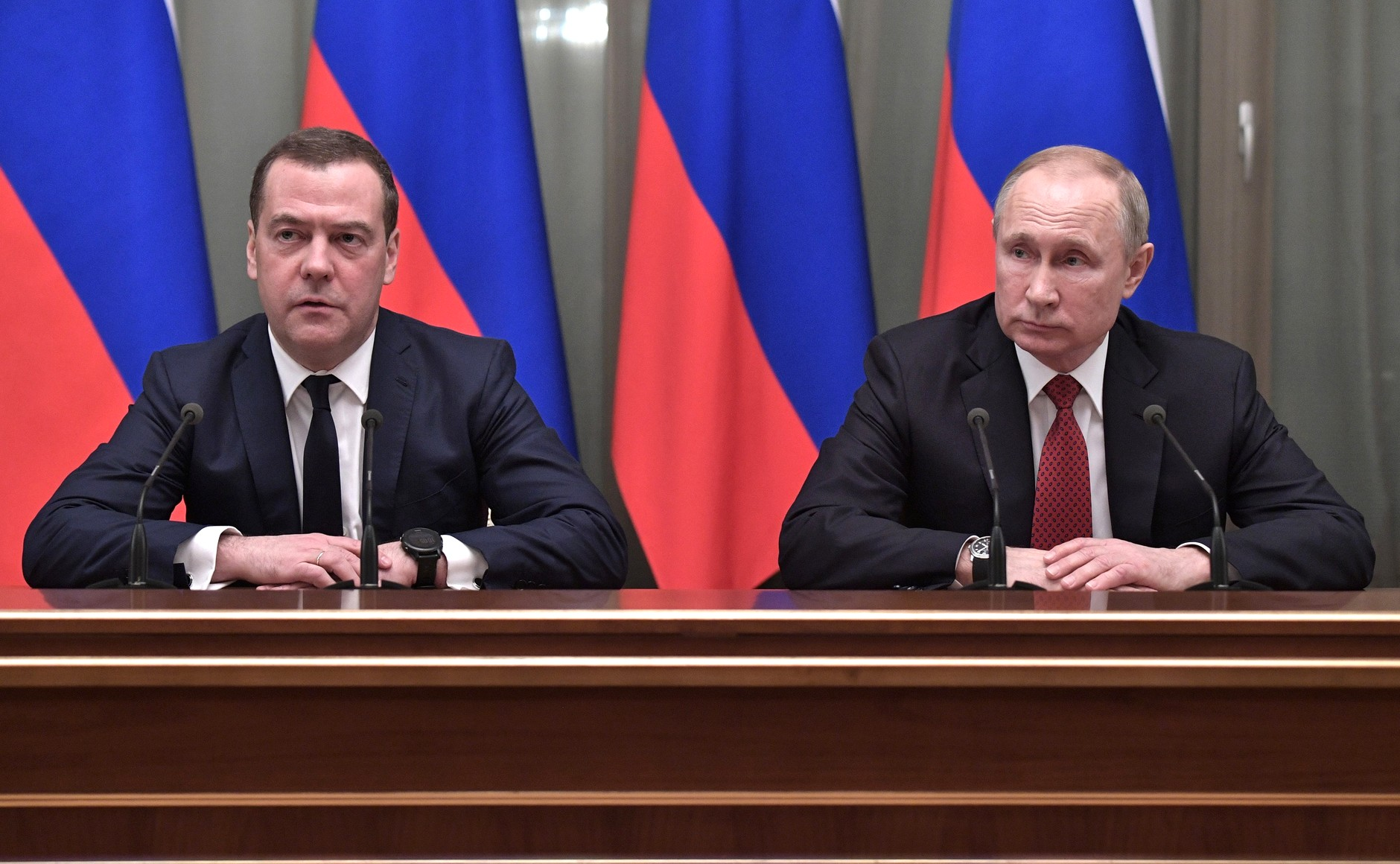
Medvedev and Putin during the announcement of the Cabinet's resignation

A few hours after the message, during a meeting of the Russian government, Prime Minister Dmitry Medvedev announced his resignation, along with his entire Cabinet. According to Medvedev, this is necessary so that Putin can make all the necessary decisions to change the Constitution. On the same day, Vladimir Putin nominated Mikhail Mishustin, the head of the Federal Tax Service, for the next prime minister. Medvedev was then appointed as Deputy Chairman of the Security Council of Russia the following day.

=== Creation of a working group on changing the Constitution ===
On January 15, 2020, Vladimir Putin signed an order to create a working group to prepare proposals for amendments to the Constitution of the Russian Federation. The group included 75 people, including the heads of the legal committees of both houses of Parliament Andrey Klishas and Pavel Krasheninnikov, a number of State Duma deputies and senators as well as a number of public, cultural and sports figures.

== Coverage and viewership ==
The Presidential Address to the Federal Assembly was televised on five federal television channels: Channel One, Russia 1, Russia 24, NTV, Mir and PTR. The broadcast of the address was watched by more than 8.4 million Russians, according to research company Mediascope.
