= Mokretsevo =

Mokretsevo Мокрецово
- Village
- Location within Vologda Oblast Location within Russia
- Coordinates: 59°34′N 45°27′E
- Country: Russia
- Region: Vologda Oblast
- District: Nikolsky District
- Time zone: UTC+3:00

Mokretsevo (Russian: Мокрецово) is a rural locality (a village) in Krasnopolyanskoye Rural Settlement, Nikolsky District, Vologda Oblast, Russia. The population was 75 as of 2002. There are 2 streets.

== Geography ==
Mokretsevo is located 6 km north of Nikolsk (the district's administrative centre) by road. Zhivotovo is the nearest rural locality.
