= Mokrets =

Mokrets (Ukrainian: Мокрець) is the name of several places in Ukraine.

- Moktets, Brovary Raion
- Moktets, Kovel Raion
- Moktets, Shepetivka Raion
