= Mikhail Mokretsov =

Russian businessman and state official (born 1961)

- Михаил Мокрецов
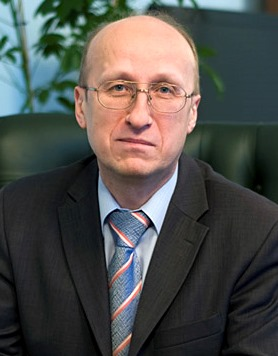
- Mokretsov in 2010

Vice-Governor of Saint Petersburg
- In office 23 April 2013 – 26 December 2018
- Preceded by: Igor Metelsky

Chief of Staff of the Ministry of Defence
- In office 27 July 2010 – 7 July 2011
- Succeeded by: Yuriy Sadovenko

Director of the Federal Taxation Service
- In office 21 February 2007 – 6 April 2010
- Preceded by: Anatoliy Serdyukov
- Succeeded by: Mikhail Mishustin

Personal details
- Born: Mikhail Pavlovich Mokretsov; 9 February 1961 (age 65) Menil, Igrinsky District, Udmurt Autonomous SSR, Soviet Union
- Education: Saint Petersburg State University of Economics
- Awards: Order "For Merit to the Fatherland" Fourth Class; Order of Honour; Medal "For the Strengthening of the Military Commonwealth"; Medal "For Merit to the Chechen Republic"; Honoured Economist of the Russian Federation

Mikhail Pavlovich Mokretsov (Russian: Михаил Павлович Мокрецов; born 9 February 1961) is a Russian businessman and state official who served as Director of the Federal Taxation Service from 2007 and 2010. He has the federal state civilian service rank of 1st class Active State Councillor of the Russian Federation.

== Early life ==
Mikhail Mokretsov graduated the Leningrad Institute of Finance & Economics (currently Saint Petersburg State University of Economics and Finance) in 1984 with a degree in economics.

After graduating he served for two years as an officer in the Soviet Army.

== Career ==
In the years 1986 - 1988 he worked as a Deputy Accountant General at the "Bolshevik" plant in Leningrad. The plant was producing high-tech equipment for the Soviet Army.

In 1989 - 1992 was an Accountant General at "DAP International", a company operating in the sphere of international trade.

Later, in 1992 - 1996 worked as a Financial Director in the agricultural company "Rosagrico".

From 1996 to year 2000 was a Director General of the consulting company "A&P Audit", which he also co-owned.

Since year 2000 has been a state official. First, Mr. Mokretsov worked as a Chief of the Control & Inspection Department of the Saint Petersburg Directorate of the Tax Ministry of Russia. Later he was promoted to the position of Deputy Chief of the Saint Petersburg Directorate of the Tax Ministry of Russia.

In 2004 he moved to Moscow and became the Chief of the Moscow Directorate of the Tax Ministry of Russia. The same year he was later appointed a Chief of the International Cooperation Department of the Tax Ministry of Russia.

On 19 November 2004 Mokretsov became the Deputy Chief of the Federal Tax Service, which Tax Ministry of Russia was reorganized into.

On 21 February 2007 he was appointed as the Chief of the Federal Tax Service.

Mikhail Mokretsov is famous for his strict policy against tax legislation offenders and was considered to be one of the closest allies of the Defence Minister of the Russian Federation Anatoliy Serdyukov and Prime Minister of Russia Viktor Zubkov.

Mikhail Mokretsov is married and has a son named Alexander (born 1984).

In 2006 Mikhail Mokretsov was given the title of Honoured Economist of the Russian Federation.

On 7 April 2010 Mikhail Mokretsov was appointed Chief of Staff of Ministry of Defence of the Russian Federation.
