= List of Russian federal districts by GDP =

This is a list of Russian federal districts by GDP measures counted in PPP or Nominal. The Central Federal District, North Caucasian Federal District, Northwestern Federal District, Southern Federal District and the Volga Federal District are counted for the European part of Russia, while the Far Eastern Federal District, Siberian Federal District and Ural Federal District are counted for the Asian part of Russia.

Comparison of GDP figures between Federal districts of Russia and sovereign countries for the Year 2021.
Rank	Region	GDP PPP (billions int$)
	Russia	4448
(1)	European Russia	3150
(2)	Asian Russia	1298
1	Central Federal District	1530
2	Volga Federal District	619
3	Ural Federal District	613
4	Northwestern Federal District	610
5	Siberian Federal District	414
6	Southern Federal District	292
7	Far Eastern Federal District	271
8	North Caucasian Federal District	100
Rank	Region	Nominal GDP (billions EUR)
	Russia	1392
(1)	European Russia	985
(2)	Asian Russia	407
1	Central Federal District	479
2	Volga Federal District	194
3	Ural Federal District	192
4	Northwestern Federal District	191
5	Siberian Federal District	130
6	Southern Federal District	91
7	Far Eastern Federal District	85
8	North Caucasian Federal District	31

== See also ==
- List of Russian federal subjects by GRP
