= List of federal subjects of Russia by GDP per capita =

List of Russian federal subjects by GDP per capita

Tyumen Oblast has largest GRDP per capita in Russia of around US$84,000 while Ingushetia has lowest of around US$2,000. In 2022, Moscow GRDP per capita reached US$32,000 while Saint Petersburg stood at US$30,000.

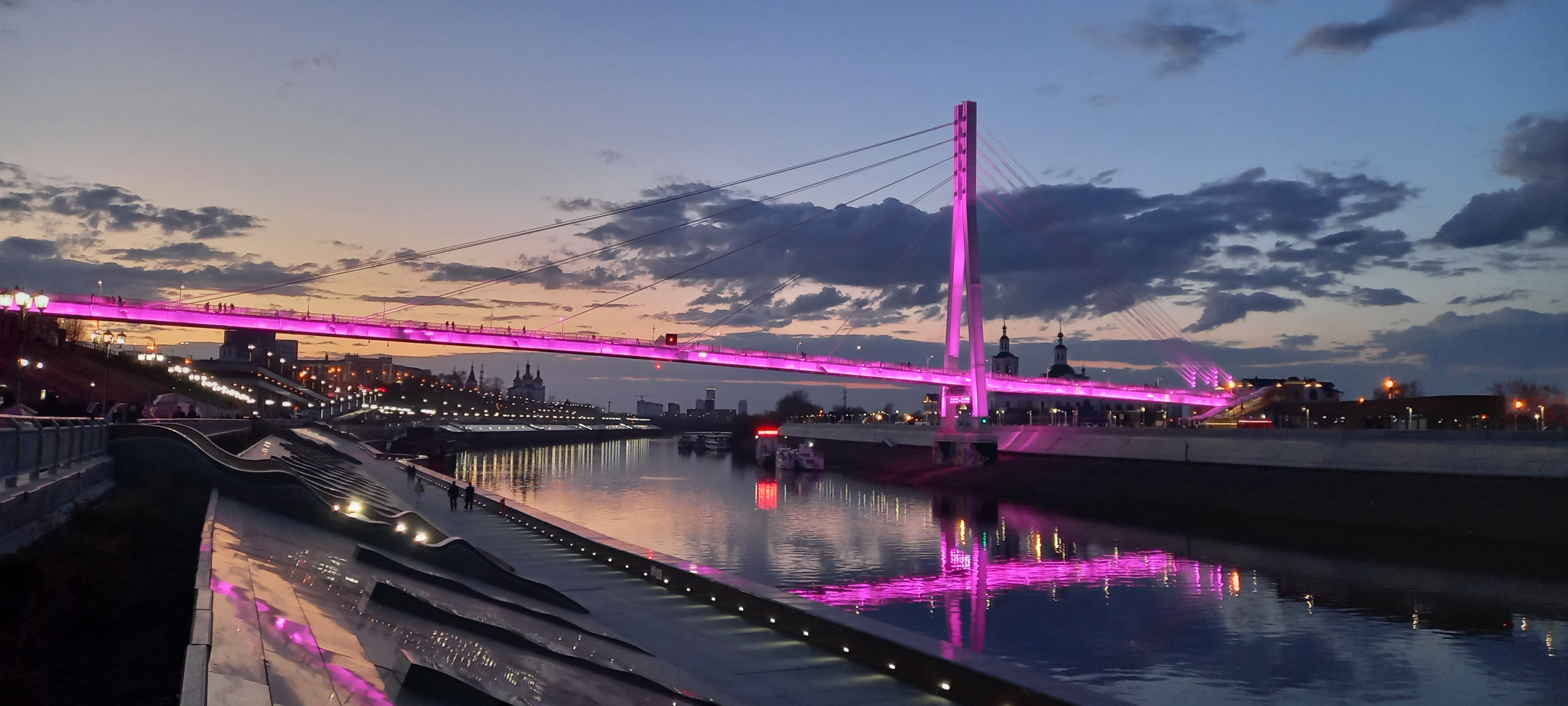
Tyumen has largest nominal GDP per capita in Russia (US$84,000)

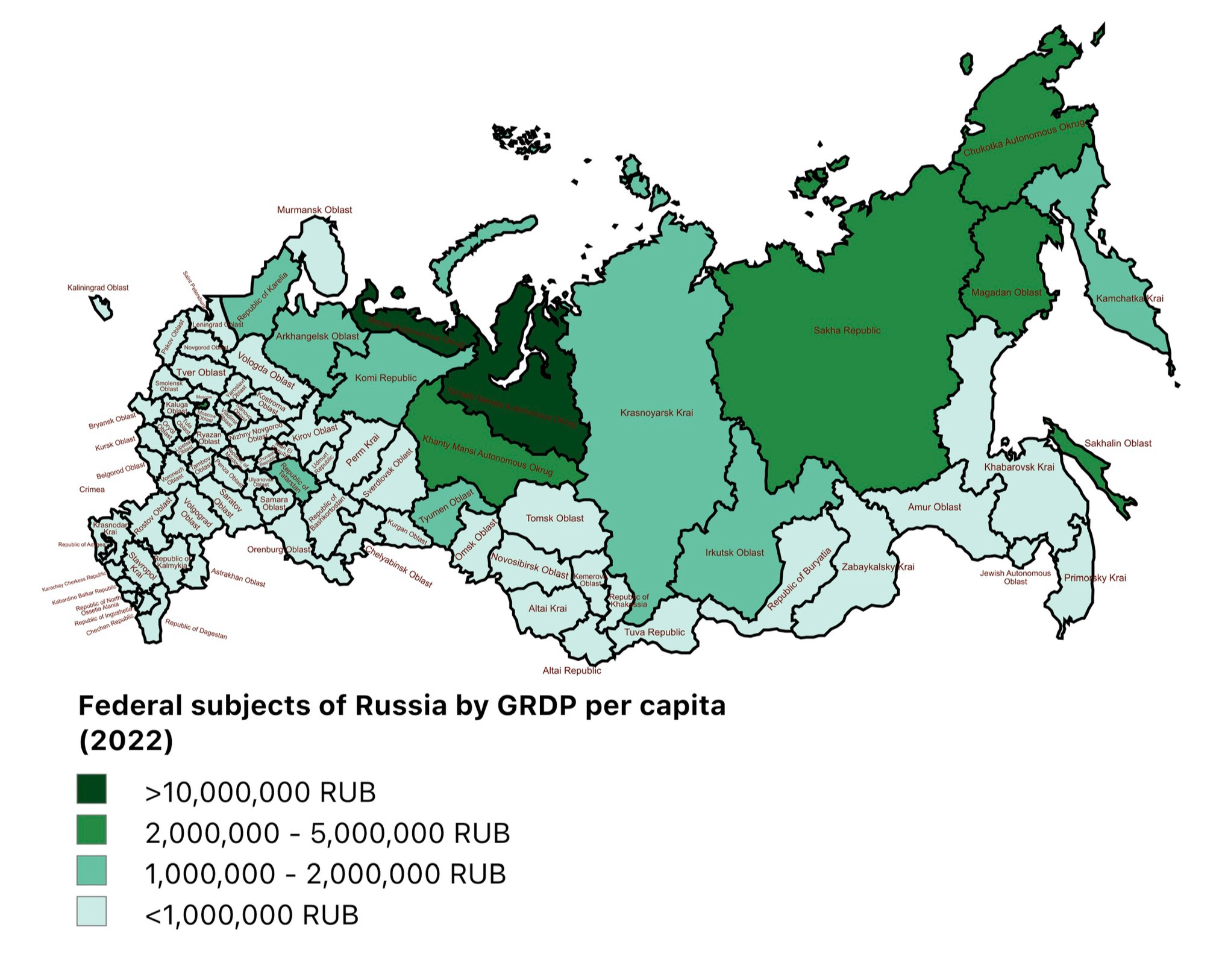
Federal subjects of Russia by GRDP per capita in RUB (2022)

== List ==
This is a list of Russian federal subjects by GRDP per capita.

Rank (2022)	Region	GRDP per capita (RUB)
1	Tyumen Oblast	5,637,117
2	Sakhalin Oblast	3,303,417
3	Magadan Oblast	2,338,219
4	Moscow	2,182,863
5	(Sakha Republic) Yakutia	2,029,720
6	St. Petersburg	1,992,592
7	Murmansk Oblast	1,735,233
8	Komi Republic	1,335,846
9	Kamchatka Krai	1,228,905
10	Arkhangelsk Oblast	1,175,423
11	Krasnoyarsk Krai	1,164,189
12	Tatarstan	1,044,592
13	Irkutsk Oblast	1,001,235
–	Russia	958,811
14	Vologda Oblast	903,488
15	Moscow Oblast	901,231
16	Belgorod Oblast	859,545
17	Orenburg Oblast	850,040
18	Kemerovo Oblast	848,312
19	Primorsky Krai	840,707
20	Khabarovsk Krai	828,826
21	Leningrad Oblast	822,794
22	Sverdlovsk Oblast	816,092
23	Astrakhan Oblast	802,000
24	Perm Krai	795,795
25	Amur Oblast	794,644
26	Tomsk Oblast	765,635
27	Samara Oblast	754,218
28	Nizhny Novgorod Oblast	739,125
29	Krasnodar Krai	738,801
30	Republic of Karelia	738,326
31	Kaliningrad Oblast	715,359
32	Lipetsk Oblast	700,249
33	Novosibirsk Oblast	693,656
34	Tula Oblast	674,432
35	Chelyabinsk Oblast	673,545
36	Udmurtia	668,044
37	Novgorod Oblast	657,674
38	Khakassia	656,789
39	Kaluga Oblast	647,307
40	Yaroslavl Oblast	623,525
41	Kursk Oblast	620,432
42	Voronezh Oblast	600,596
43	Vladimir Oblast	585,131
44	Ryazan Oblast	566,113
45	Rostov Oblast	556,629
46	Smolensk Oblast	549,222
47	Zabaykalsky Krai	549,172
48	Bashkortostan	549,048
49	Jewish Autonomous Oblast	543,205
50	Oryol Oblast	524,571
51	Tver Oblast	516,489
52	Omsk Oblast	514,203
53	Ulyanovsk Oblast	496,340
54	Saratov Oblast	493,792
55	Volgograd Oblast	491,187
56	Tambov Oblast	487,060
57	Kirov Oblast	484,904
58	Kostroma Oblast	480,120
59	Penza Oblast	472,850
60	Buryatia	457,865
61	Republic of Kalmykia	448,137
62	Kurgan Oblast	442,702
63	Mordovia	441,297
64	Altai Krai	440,933
65	Pskov Oblast	435,172
66	Altai Republic	434,628
67	Chuvashia	425,531
68	Stavropol Krai	414,255
69	Ivanovo Oblast	395,920
70	Adygea	395,640
71	Mari El	388,520
72	Tuva	320,059
73	(North Ossetia–Alania) North Ossetia	316,185
74	Kabardino-Balkaria	286,415
75	Dagestan	285,552
76	Karachay-Cherkessia	208,526
77	Chechnya	206,751
78	Ingushetia	159,604

== Historical data ==
Gross regional product per capita at purchasing power parity in international dollars.

Federal subject	1998	1999	2000	2001	2002	2003	2004	2005	2006	2007	2008	2009	2010	2011	2012	2013
Russia	7,362	7,387	8,282	9,101	9,803	10,845	12,091	13,455	15,068	16,929	17,752	16,552	17,269	18,305	19,052	19,854
Central Federal District	7,933	8,773	10,100	10,826	12,250	13,657	15,036	17,656	20,010	23,106	24,770	21,989	22,922	24,057	24,674	25,831
Belgorod Oblast	5,863	6,033	5,860	6,094	6,684	7,285	9,360	10,270	11,328	13,506	15,584	14,697	17,019	19,083	19,377	19,471
Bryansk Oblast	3,668	3,313	3,648	3,957	4,370	4,630	4,668	5,346	5,960	6,788	7,240	7,237	7,513	7,909	9,002	9,438
Vladimir Oblast	4,478	4,358	4,415	4,998	5,325	5,914	6,108	6,238	7,301	8,618	8,963	9,438	10,178	10,483	10,955	11,442
Voronezh Oblast	4,350	4,175	4,267	4,582	5,627	6,120	6,130	6,054	6,755	8,200	9,161	9,534	9,715	11,736	13,222	13,736
Ivanovo Oblast	3,259	2,753	2,983	3,486	3,784	4,230	4,422	4,287	4,818	5,954	6,031	6,002	6,760	7,030	7,074	7,954
Kaluga Oblast	4,469	4,198	4,701	5,556	5,775	6,830	6,971	7,409	8,080	9,492	11,054	11,269	12,197	13,416	15,482	15,400
Kostroma Oblast	5,255	4,920	4,606	5,458	5,678	5,904	6,517	6,778	7,497	8,272	8,898	8,629	9,591	10,125	10,828	11,478
Kursk Oblast	5,704	4,819	4,961	5,325	5,911	6,685	7,860	7,816	8,524	9,626	10,931	10,473	11,214	11,742	12,107	12,832
Lipetsk Oblast	6,330	7,071	8,182	7,599	9,391	11,543	14,599	12,997	14,394	15,262	16,375	14,189	13,851	14,194	13,769	14,301
Moscow Oblast	5,905	5,569	5,591	6,543	7,654	8,988	9,880	11,215	13,138	16,302	17,755	16,048	16,980	17,545	18,397	18,979
Oryol Oblast	5,096	5,019	5,273	5,827	6,683	7,150	6,775	6,872	7,603	8,246	9,007	8,406	8,806	9,654	10,255	11,228
Ryazan Oblast	4,790	4,424	4,624	5,454	6,011	7,097	7,190	7,567	8,530	8,903	9,581	9,739	10,135	10,734	12,101	12,866
Smolensk Oblast	4,961	5,233	5,405	6,176	6,467	6,823	6,705	6,819	7,414	8,164	9,043	9,285	10,248	10,618	11,279	12,248
Tambov Oblast	3,768	3,810	4,009	4,752	5,314	5,816	6,077	5,951	6,748	8,173	8,119	9,120	8,604	9,198	10,297	11,602
Tver Oblast	5,103	4,660	4,834	5,741	6,097	6,844	7,569	7,287	8,674	9,685	10,403	10,652	10,558	10,924	10,947	11,560
Tula Oblast	4,830	4,596	5,089	5,701	6,291	6,310	6,648	7,665	8,479	9,443	10,945	10,105	9,986	10,427	11,055	11,989
Yaroslavl Oblast	6,663	6,653	6,249	8,116	8,882	9,841	10,397	10,637	11,242	12,444	12,458	12,239	12,297	13,016	14,068	14,962
Moscow	16,230	19,878	24,226	24,731	27,677	30,311	33,217	40,903	45,795	51,971	54,868	46,440	47,832	49,542	48,911	50,946
North-West Federal District	7,947	7,880	8,499	9,227	10,237	11,370	13,201	14,011	15,390	17,548	18,588	18,535	18,956	20,222	20,949	21,417
Republic of Karelia	7,210	7,640	8,074	8,554	9,312	9,522	9,593	12,094	12,038	13,656	13,112	12,010	12,217	13,933	13,770	14,603
Komi Republic	12,835	11,566	11,862	13,895	13,602	15,404	16,427	18,854	21,951	22,183	23,483	24,364	25,575	28,097	29,573	29,538
Arkhangelsk Oblast	7,546	7,224	9,386	9,101	10,026	11,376	13,496	13,809	16,239	18,407	17,299	19,241	19,819	20,764	21,375	22,579
Vologda Oblast	8,659	9,718	11,195	9,370	10,259	12,355	15,967	16,745	15,729	17,204	18,110	13,009	14,258	15,522	16,215	15,061
Kaliningrad Oblast	4,207	4,587	5,093	6,217	6,796	7,125	8,716	9,329	10,566	13,311	14,313	13,350	13,627	14,713	15,252	15,257
Leningrad Oblast	6,086	6,630	6,969	8,324	9,176	10,517	12,281	13,066	15,057	15,791	16,889	18,673	18,748	19,427	21,077	20,793
Murmansk Oblast	11,127	12,126	12,394	11,583	12,330	13,251	17,880	16,774	18,220	20,210	19,710	18,604	19,173	19,227	19,781	20,907
Novgorod Oblast	6,159	6,138	6,149	7,170	7,307	8,026	8,979	10,203	10,853	11,441	13,262	13,527	13,107	14,011	14,851	15,037
Pskov Oblast	3,648	3,932	4,304	4,605	5,102	5,679	5,985	5,972	6,903	7,561	7,880	8,034	8,423	8,659	8,848	9,144
St. Petersburg	8,633	7,964	8,341	9,846	11,655	12,740	14,360	15,183	16,716	20,352	22,376	22,628	22,860	24,481	24,971	25,923
South Federal District	4,564	4,599	4,906	5,590	6,004	6,409	6,834	7,235	8,283	9,863	10,808	10,636	11,047	11,548	12,526	13,353
Republic of Adygea	3,308	2,837	2,580	2,733	2,864	3,201	3,482	4,124	4,605	5,738	6,156	6,973	7,023	7,422	8,048	8,528
Republic of Kalmykia	2,347	2,003	4,229	4,095	3,991	3,245	3,602	3,535	4,197	5,094	5,339	6,098	5,522	5,873	6,873	7,665
Krasnodar Krai	4,820	5,432	5,597	6,422	6,870	7,039	7,586	7,795	9,032	10,867	11,590	12,224	12,889	13,649	15,028	15,900
Astrakhan Oblast	4,872	4,456	5,828	5,894	6,597	7,301	6,975	7,476	8,141	8,645	10,939	9,822	9,385	9,830	11,294	13,900
Volgograd Oblast	5,268	4,562	4,890	5,613	6,246	6,946	7,169	8,217	9,169	10,920	11,882	10,655	10,867	11,269	12,064	12,411
Rostov Oblast	4,049	4,054	4,191	4,933	5,166	5,677	6,272	6,486	7,536	9,043	10,024	9,571	10,088	10,346	10,827	11,462
North Caucasus Federal District	3,260	2,777	2,892	3,386	3,619	4,069	4,342	4,181	4,833	5,423	5,898	6,239	6,213	6,494	6,943	7,496
Dagestan Republic	1,719	1,518	1,779	2,311	2,619	3,212	3,791	3,623	4,383	4,912	5,757	6,686	6,210	6,516	6,969	7,667
Republic of Ingushetia	1,642	1,437	1,397	1,472	1,254	1,497	1,736	1,867	2,101	3,574	3,512	3,409	3,157	3,665	4,685	5,323
Kabardino-Balkar Republic	3,167	3,117	3,341	4,017	4,103	4,208	4,070	4,524	4,813	4,929	5,061	5,645	5,869	6,077	6,789	6,956
Karachay–Cherkessia	3,061	2,693	2,599	3,061	3,768	3,767	3,632	3,959	4,866	5,118	5,700	6,037	6,007	5,965	6,780	7,025
Republic of North Ossetia–Alania	2,743	2,773	2,507	3,295	3,646	3,870	4,248	4,725	5,868	6,428	6,060	6,649	6,924	6,966	7,526	8,390
Chechen Republic	–	–	–	–	–	–	–	2,146	2,667	3,508	4,091	3,838	3,665	3,875	4,256	4,666
Stavropol Krai	4,964	3,952	4,107	4,559	4,764	5,370	5,521	5,720	6,338	6,978	7,436	7,383	7,784	8,210	8,460	9,036
Volga Federal District	6,460	6,260	6,870	7,568	7,687	8,452	9,185	9,806	11,090	12,394	13,218	12,106	12,483	13,619	14,426	15,194
Republic of Bashkortostan	6,583	6,684	7,384	7,471	7,400	8,589	9,411	10,031	11,925	12,583	13,688	11,772	12,209	13,335	15,461	16,439
Republic of Mari El	3,906	3,487	3,167	3,772	3,948	4,596	5,168	4,989	5,885	6,736	6,988	7,302	7,731	8,085	9,264	9,517
Republic of Mordovia	4,293	3,715	4,027	4,502	4,989	5,460	5,422	5,459	6,450	7,793	8,286	7,967	8,246	8,338	8,929	9,661
Republic of Tatarstan	8,317	8,061	10,295	10,390	10,723	11,710	12,837	13,730	15,433	17,392	18,355	17,294	17,317	19,837	20,597	21,307
Udmurt Republic	5,655	6,102	7,016	7,617	8,054	8,246	8,011	9,671	10,244	11,576	11,870	11,170	11,802	12,749	13,421	14,073
Chuvash Republic	3,989	3,498	3,620	4,278	4,571	5,005	5,688	5,782	7,010	8,432	9,190	8,218	8,237	8,715	9,559	9,535
Perm Krai	8,599	8,526	9,066	10,775	10,194	10,837	11,911	12,812	13,595	15,397	17,017	15,016	15,443	18,399	17,858	17,882
Kirov Oblast	4,779	4,557	4,853	5,022	5,357	5,637	5,998	5,967	6,608	7,361	8,230	7,951	8,383	8,443	8,609	9,014
Nizhny Novgorod Oblast	6,196	5,584	6,095	7,685	7,815	8,571	8,618	9,354	10,605	12,129	13,121	12,115	12,881	13,456	13,975	14,863
Orenburg Oblast	5,889	6,567	7,246	7,132	6,978	7,760	9,842	10,827	13,947	15,551	15,676	14,940	14,723	15,733	17,006	18,598
Penza Oblast	3,324	3,334	3,541	4,148	4,618	4,826	5,148	5,586	6,011	7,310	7,882	7,789	8,118	8,913	9,554	10,470
Samara Oblast	9,789	9,028	8,958	10,145	10,284	11,501	12,545	13,339	14,493	15,694	16,223	13,387	14,149	14,959	15,941	17,090
Saratov Oblast	4,879	4,548	4,885	5,720	5,889	6,553	7,142	7,030	7,583	8,522	9,422	9,486	9,742	9,884	10,430	11,155
Ulyanovsk Oblast	4,901	4,598	4,486	5,050	5,325	5,825	6,139	6,404	7,329	8,159	8,579	8,726	9,001	10,025	10,284	10,804
Ural Federal District	12,022	11,742	14,525	16,568	17,440	19,512	22,587	27,206	29,456	30,325	29,802	26,649	27,719	30,047	31,873	33,027
Kurgan Oblast	4,230	3,914	3,721	4,494	4,731	5,327	5,308	5,538	6,875	7,454	8,537	8,643	8,444	8,708	8,957	9,883
Sverdlovsk Oblast	7,579	6,901	7,168	8,116	8,449	9,255	10,216	11,639	14,427	16,406	15,986	14,134	15,921	17,299	18,820	19,376
Tyumen Oblast	28,059	27,666	37,066	42,722	44,577	49,434	57,897	72,086	74,085	71,869	69,812	62,979	63,708	69,076	72,530	75,014
Chelyabinsk Oblast	5,820	6,084	6,916	7,214	7,727	8,904	10,135	10,618	12,213	14,247	14,240	11,807	12,284	12,837	13,212	13,298
Siberian Federal District	7,005	6,417	7,057	7,666	7,978	8,790	10,219	10,668	12,051	13,374	13,333	12,984	14,033	14,379	14,710	15,140
Altai Republic	3,638	3,050	2,829	4,077	4,231	4,933	5,206	4,668	5,516	6,452	6,853	7,171	7,117	7,330	7,946	8,272
Republic of Buryatia	5,246	4,522	4,516	5,577	6,231	7,749	8,132	8,279	9,101	9,627	9,651	9,243	9,004	9,117	9,266	9,635
Republic of Tuva	3,067	2,512	2,462	3,130	3,626	3,856	3,999	4,115	4,797	5,529	5,857	6,490	6,545	6,236	6,590	7,078
Republic of Khakassia	6,943	6,649	6,565	6,679	7,512	7,726	7,591	8,338	9,663	10,370	10,165	11,239	11,805	12,250	13,405	14,190
Altai Krai	3,837	3,441	3,700	4,325	4,527	4,970	5,561	5,762	6,694	7,846	7,923	8,055	8,179	7,937	8,392	9,049
Trans-Baikal Krai	5,078	4,883	5,305	5,515	6,218	6,710	6,664	6,611	7,769	8,606	9,443	9,892	9,854	10,658	11,154	11,092
Krasnoyarsk Krai	10,985	11,565	14,934	14,724	12,571	13,411	15,506	16,317	19,649	22,339	19,453	19,529	24,404	23,819	22,748	23,262
Irkutsk Oblast	9,020	8,248	8,195	8,470	8,759	9,487	10,398	11,019	12,785	14,143	13,375	13,859	14,685	15,078	16,643	17,362
Kemerovo Oblast	6,861	6,113	6,295	7,145	7,579	8,303	10,625	11,218	11,729	13,599	15,490	13,636	14,805	15,713	14,292	12,874
Novosibirsk Oblast	6,028	5,448	5,546	6,471	7,385	8,312	8,892	9,474	10,702	11,948	12,811	11,830	11,895	12,892	14,748	15,928
Omsk Oblast	5,967	4,434	4,534	5,375	7,185	8,076	11,682	11,668	12,517	12,806	13,056	12,503	12,647	13,172	13,604	14,784
Tomsk Oblast	9,137	7,090	8,042	9,975	11,662	13,504	15,853	16,636	17,675	18,096	18,077	17,521	17,841	18,277	19,133	19,897
Far East Federal District	9,749	9,502	9,414	10,617	11,353	12,238	12,775	13,616	14,891	17,297	18,052	20,188	21,921	23,266	23,595	23,743
Republic of Sakha (Yakutia)	16,336	18,242	17,887	19,451	19,596	20,296	19,964	20,548	20,751	21,909	24,131	25,291	26,421	29,325	30,952	31,429
Kamchatka Krai	14,550	11,175	10,289	11,640	11,634	12,169	12,525	13,839	16,116	17,343	17,815	21,558	20,935	20,547	21,735	21,672
Primorsky Krai	6,894	6,968	6,105	6,370	7,542	8,403	9,247	9,905	10,359	11,294	11,987	13,849	15,723	16,235	15,632	15,628
Khabarovsk Krai	9,348	7,658	9,254	10,115	11,348	11,826	11,732	12,449	13,608	14,731	14,867	15,143	17,194	17,157	17,832	18,633
Amur Oblast	7,234	6,184	5,933	7,833	8,159	8,619	9,027	9,487	10,648	11,402	11,682	13,333	14,061	15,749	15,303	13,686
Magadan Oblast	15,477	14,360	13,766	16,554	19,614	19,589	17,307	16,897	17,730	18,453	19,343	22,108	24,735	26,756	27,932	30,843
Sakhalin Oblast	10,263	12,874	12,905	15,594	13,897	16,915	21,288	24,660	30,772	48,394	49,154	57,590	63,965	69,757	70,957	72,212
Jewish Autonomous Oblast	3,609	4,326	4,082	4,576	5,785	6,549	7,429	8,279	9,543	11,455	10,042	10,514	11,676	12,975	13,460	11,651
Chukotka Autonomous District	18,132	14,025	13,820	22,651	30,304	37,240	29,484	25,392	28,281	34,314	43,511	64,419	50,258	50,926	49,009	48,919

== See also ==
- List of Russian federal subjects by GRDP
- List of Russian federal subjects by average wage
