= Federal districts of Russia =

Federal subjects of Russia

The eight federal districts of Russia as of 2021

The federal districts (Russian: федеральные округа, romanized: federal'nyye okruga, IPA: [fʲɪdʲɪˈralʲnɨjɪ ɐkrʊˈɡa]) are groupings of the federal subjects of Russia. Federal districts consist of a group of regions with various autonomy levels as per constitution, but the districts themselves are not mentioned by the constitution and are not autonomous, do not have administrative competences of their own, and do not manage regional affairs. They exist solely to monitor consistency between the federal and regional bodies of law, and ensure federal management of the civil service, judiciary, and federal agencies operating in the regions. The federal district system was established on 13 May 2000.

== List of federal districts ==
Federal district	Date established	Area (km^{2})	2021 census		HDI (2021)	GRDP (2023)		Federal subjects	Administrative centre	Largest city	Map
Federal district	Date established	Area (km^{2})	Population	per km^{2}	HDI (2021)	Total	Per capita	Federal subjects	Administrative centre	Largest city	Map
Central	13 May 2000	650,200	40,342,000	62	0.845	₽54.102 trillion ($635 billion)	₽1,345,162 ($15795)	18	Moscow		
Northwestern	13 May 2000	1,687,000	13,917,000	8	0.833	₽19.262 trillion ($226 billion)	₽1,390,383 ($16326)	11	Saint Petersburg		
Southern (Note: Includes the Republic of Crimea and Sevastopol, annexed by Russia in 2014, as well as Donetsk, Kherson, Luhansk, and Zaporizhia oblasts annexed in 2022; recognized as parts of Ukraine by most of the international community.)	13 May 2000	427,800	16,746,000 (Note: Population figures from the Crimean Census in 2014. Crimea was annexed by Russia in 2014, after the 2010 Russian Census.)	39	0.799	₽9.816 trillion ($143 billion)	₽588,461 ($8593)	8	Rostov-on-Don	Krasnodar	
North Caucasian	19 January 2010	170,400	10,171,000	60	0.793	₽3.569 trillion ($42 billion)	₽348,930 ($4097)	7	Pyatigorsk	Makhachkala	
Volga	13 May 2000	1,037,000	28,943,000	28	0.804	₽22.013 trillion ($258 billion)	₽769,355 ($9034)	14	Nizhny Novgorod	Kazan	
Ural	13 May 2000	1,818,500	12,301,000	7	0.839	₽23.044 trillion ($271 billion)	₽1,879,521 ($22070)	6	Yekaterinburg		
Siberian	13 May 2000	4,361,800	16,793,000	4	0.794	₽13.962 trillion ($164 billion)	₽840,764 ($9873)	10	Novosibirsk		
Far Eastern	13 May 2000	6,952,600	7,976,000	1	0.808	₽10.129 trillion ($119 billion)	₽1,284,545 ($15084)	11	Vladivostok	Khabarovsk	

== History ==
The federal districts of Russia were established by a decree issued by President Vladimir Putin on 13 May 2000 to facilitate the federal government's control of the then 89 federal subjects across the country.

On 19 January 2010, the new North Caucasian Federal District split from the Southern Federal District.

In March 2014, after the annexation of Crimea, the Crimean Federal District was established. The legality of this annexation is disputed by an overwhelming majority of countries. On 28 July 2016, the Crimean Federal District was abolished and merged into the Southern Federal District in order to improve governance.

In November 2018, Buryatia and Zabaykalsky Krai were moved from the Siberian Federal District to the Far Eastern Federal District in accordance with a decree issued by Putin. The administrative centre of the Far Eastern Federal District relocated from Khabarovsk to Vladivostok in December 2018.

== Presidential plenipotentiary envoys ==
- Central Federal District
  - Igor Shchyogolev (since 26 June 2018)
- Southern Federal District
  - Vladimir Ustinov (since 12 May 2008)
- Northwestern Federal District
  - Igor Rudenya (since 29 September 2025)
- Far Eastern Federal District
  - Yury Trutnev (since 31 August 2013)
- Siberian Federal District
  - Anatoly Seryshev (since 12 October 2021)
- Ural Federal District
  - Artyom Zhoga (since 2 October 2024)
- Volga Federal District
  - Igor Komarov (since 7 September 2018)
- North Caucasian Federal District
  - Yury Chaika (since 22 January 2020)

== See also ==
- Economic regions of Russia, a similar grouping of federal subjects, for economic and statistical purposes
- List of countries and dependencies by area
- Military districts of Russia, a similar grouping of federal subjects, for military purposes
- Zonal Councils of India, similar entities
