= List of federal subjects of Russia by Human Development Index =

Russian federal subjects compared by Human Development Index

Federal subjects of Russia by HDI (2016) Legend: > 0.950 0.900 – 0.950 0.850 – 0.900 0.800 – 0.850

This is a list of Russian federal subjects by Human Development Index as of 2019 (2021 data - Analytical Center for the Government of the Russian Federation).

Rank	Federal district	HDI (2019)
Very high human development
1	Moscow	0.940
2	Saint Petersburg	0.918
3	Khanty-Mansi Autonomous Okrug	0.914
4	Yamalo-Nenets Autonomous Okrug	0.902
5	Nenets Autonomous Okrug	0.899
6	Tatarstan	0.897
7	Tyumen Oblast	0.891
8	Sakhalin Oblast	0.889
9	Yakutia	0.886
10	Belgorod Oblast	0.882
11	Astrakhan Oblast	0.874
12	Krasnoyarsk Krai	0.873
=13	Tomsk Oblast	0.871
=13	Magadan Oblast	0.871
=15	Moscow Oblast	0.866
=15	Samara Oblast	0.866
=15	Komi Republic	0.866
18	Sverdlovsk Oblast	0.864
=19	Lipetsk Oblast	0.862
=19	Novosibirsk Oblast	0.862
21	Orenburg Oblast	0.860
=22	Udmurtia	0.859
=22	Voronezh Oblast	0.859
=24	Yaroslavl Oblast	0.858
=24	Kaluga Oblast	0.858
26	Kursk Oblast	0.856
=27	Kaliningrad Oblast	0.855
=27	Krasnodar Krai	0.855
=27	Omsk Oblast	0.855
=30	Perm Krai	0.854
=30	Nizhny Novgorod Oblast	0.854
=32	Chelyabinsk Oblast	0.852
=32	Irkutsk Oblast	0.852
=34	Rostov Oblast	0.850
=34	Oryol Oblast	0.850
=34	Vologda Oblast	0.850
=37	Tula Oblast	0.849
=37	Murmansk Oblast	0.849
=37	Ryazan Oblast	0.849
=40	Volgograd Oblast	0.848
=40	Bashkortostan	0.848
=42	Tambov Oblast	0.846
=42	Chukotka Autonomous Okrug	0.846
44	Leningrad Oblast	0.845
=45	Mordovia	0.844
=45	Saratov Oblast	0.844
=47	Arkhangelsk Oblast	0.843
=47	Penza Oblast	0.843
49	Kalmykia	0.842
50	Republic of Karelia	0.841
=51	Khabarovsk Krai	0.839
=51	Ulyanovsk Oblast	0.839
=51	Khakassia	0.839
54	Kamchatka Krai	0.838
55	Primorsky Krai	0.836
=56	Novgorod Oblast	0.835
=56	Chuvashia	0.835
=56	Vladimir Oblast	0.835
59	Smolensk Oblast	0.834
60	Tver Oblast	0.833
=61	North Ossetia–Alania	0.832
=61	Kirov Oblast	0.832
=61	Sevastopol	0.832
=64	Mari El	0.830
=64	Kostroma Oblast	0.830
=64	Bryansk Oblast	0.830
=67	Adygea	0.828
=67	Stavropol Krai	0.828
=67	Kemerovo Oblast	0.828
70	Dagestan	0.827
–	Russia (average)	0.824
71	Amur Oblast	0.822
72	Ingushetia	0.820
=73	Altai Krai	0.815
=73	Kurgan Oblast	0.815
=75	Crimea	0.813
=75	Pskov Oblast	0.813
77	Ivanovo Oblast	0.812
78	Kabardino-Balkaria	0.811
=79	Karachay-Cherkessia	0.810
=79	Buryatia	0.810
81	Zabaykalsky Krai	0.804
82	Altai Republic	0.800
High human development
83	Chechnya	0.793
84	Jewish Autonomous Oblast	0.788
85	Tuva	0.787

== Federal districts ==
This is a list of Russian federal districts by Human Development Index as of 2023.

Rank	Federal district	HDI (2023)
Very high human development
=1	Ural Federal District	0.833
=1	Northwestern Federal District	0.833
–	Russia (average)	0.832
3	Central Federal District	0.826
High human development
4	Volga Federal District	0.789
5	Far Eastern Federal District	0.780
6	Siberian Federal District	0.779
7	Southern Federal District	0.776
8	North Caucasian Federal District	0.765

== See also ==
- List of countries by Human Development Index
