= List of Russian federal subjects by GRDP =

List of Russian federal subjects by gross regional product

This article is a list of Russian federal subjects by Gross regional domestic product (GRDP).

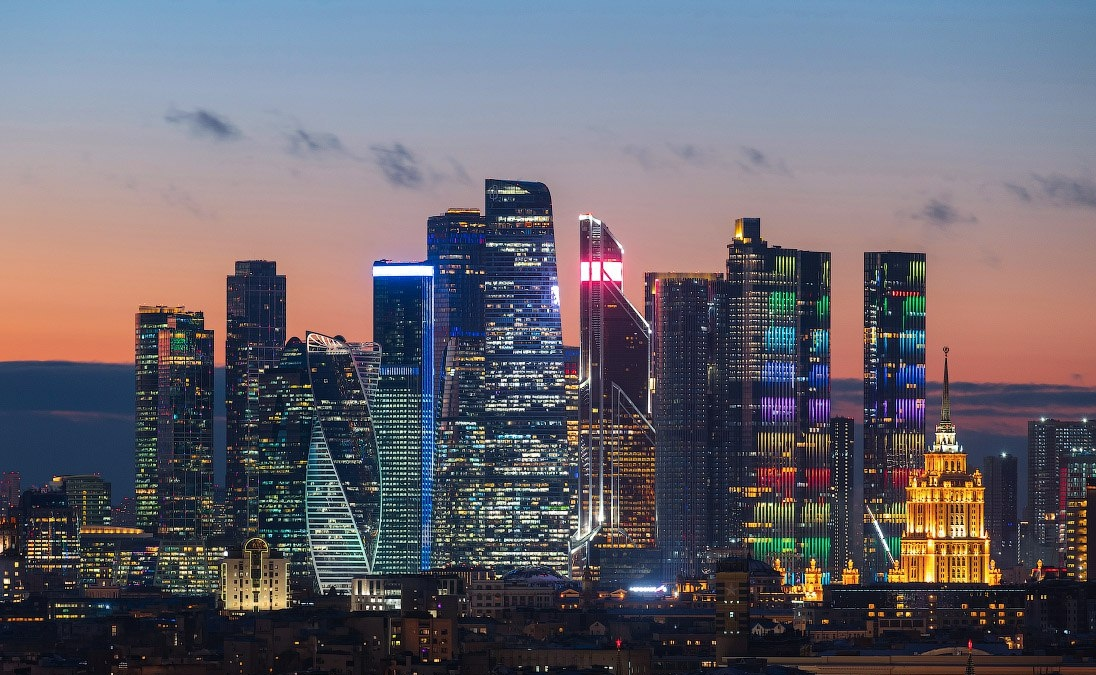
Moscow has the largest GDP in Russia (US$481 billion).

== List ==
For easy comparison, GRDP figures are listed in rubles (RUB) and US dollar (USD), converted according to the exchange rate. All GRDP figures in rubles are from the State Statistics of Russian Federation.

GRDP lists of Russian federal subjects in 2024
| Rank (2024) | Federal subject | Russian name | (billion RUB) | (billion USD) | Per capita (RUB) | Per capita (USD) |
|---|---|---|---|---|---|---|
| – | Russian Federation | Российская Федерация | 186,545 | 2190.47 | 1,278,523 | 15012.83 |
| 1 | Moscow | Москва | 41,004 | 481.48 | 3,103,504 | 36442.35 |
| 2 | Saint Petersburg | Санкт-Петербург | 12,946 | 152.02 | 2,323,281 | 27280.72 |
| 3 | Moscow Oblast | Московская область | 10,883 | 127.79 | 1,249,020 | 14666.4 |
| 4 | Khanty-Mansi Autonomous Okrug | Ханты-Мансийский автономный округ | 9,934 | 116.65 | 5,910,256 | 69400.15 |
| 5 | Yamalo-Nenets Autonomous Okrug | Ямало-Ненецкий автономный округ | 6,336 | 74.4 | 12,196,002 | 143209.42 |
| 6 | Krasnodar Krai | Краснодарский край | 5,384 | 63.22 | 924,115 | 10851.26 |
| 7 | Tatarstan | Татарстан | 4,563 | 53.58 | 1,136,828 | 13349 |
| 8 | Sverdlovsk Oblast | Свердловская область | 4,749 | 55.76 | 1,128,095 | 13246.46 |
| 9 | Krasnoyarsk Krai | Красноярский край | 4,327 | 50.81 | 1,522,499 | 17877.68 |
| 10 | Rostov Oblast | Ростовская область | 3,094 | 36.33 | 746,513 | 8765.8 |
| 11 | Nizhny Novgorod Oblast | Нижегородская область | 3,080 | 36.17 | 1,009,813 | 11857.55 |
| 12 | Samara Oblast | Самарская область | 3,016 | 35.41 | 965,066 | 11332.12 |
| 13 | Irkutsk Oblast | Иркутская область | 2,988 | 35.09 | 1,280,210 | 15032.64 |
| 14 | Chelyabinsk Oblast | Челябинская область | 2,752 | 32.31 | 812,058 | 9535.45 |
| 15 | Perm Krai | Пермский край | 2,604 | 30.58 | 1,048,002 | 12305.98 |
| 16 | Sakha Republic | Саха (Якутия) | 2,531 | 29.72 | 2,520,579 | 29597.46 |
| 17 | Bashkortostan | Башкортостан | 2,510 | 29.47 | 619,531 | 7274.73 |
| 18 | Novosibirsk Oblast | Новосибирская область | 2,130 | 25.01 | 766,864 | 9004.77 |
| 19 | Kemerovo Oblast | Кемеровская область | 1,819 | 21.36 | 716,693 | 8415.64 |
| 20 | Leningrad Oblast | Ленинградская область | 2,404 | 28.23 | 1,180,432 | 13861.02 |
| 21 | Primorsky Krai | Приморский край | 2,135 | 25.07 | 1,161,200 | 13635.19 |
| 22 | Orenburg Oblast | Оренбургская область | 2,068 | 24.28 | 1,124,335 | 13202.31 |
| 23 | Tyumen Oblast | Тюменская область | 1,691 | 19.86 | 1,051,970 | 12352.57 |
| 24 | Sakhalin Oblast | Сахалинская область | 1,677 | 19.69 | 3,685,840 | 43280.33 |
| 25 | Voronezh Oblast | Воронежская область | 1,515 | 17.79 | 662,810 | 7782.93 |
| 26 | Belgorod Oblast | Белгородская область | 1,515 | 17.79 | 1,015,794 | 11927.78 |
| 27 | Khabarovsk Krai | Хабаровский край | 1,348 | 15.83 | 1,040,000 | 12212.02 |
| 28 | Tula Oblast | Тульская область | 1,305 | 15.32 | 901,343 | 10583.86 |
| 29 | Altai Krai | Алтайский край | 1,276 | 14.98 | 605,546 | 7110.52 |
| 30 | Volgograd Oblast | Волгоградская область | 1,257 | 14.76 | 514,513 | 6041.58 |
| 31 | Vologda Oblast | Вологодская область | 1,210 | 14.21 | 1,091,980 | 12822.38 |
| 32 | Stavropol Krai | Ставропольский край | 1,160 | 13.62 | 409,173 | 4804.64 |
| 33 | Murmansk Oblast | Мурманская область | 1,121 | 13.16 | 1,714,105 | 20127.58 |
| 34 | Omsk Oblast | Омская область | 1,097 | 12.88 | 598,753 | 7030.75 |
| 35 | Dagestan | Дагестан | 1,093 | 12.83 | 344,807 | 4048.84 |
| 36 | Tomsk Oblast | Томская область | 1,097 | 12.88 | 1,053,059 | 12365.36 |
| 37 | Komi Republic | Республика Коми | 1,031 | 12.11 | 1,424,008 | 16721.17 |
| 38 | Udmurtia | Удмуртия | 1,029 | 12.08 | 724,115 | 8502.79 |
| 39 | Saratov Oblast | Саратовская область | 1,019 | 11.97 | 433,762 | 5093.37 |
| 40 | Lipetsk Oblast | Липецкая область | 913 | 10.72 | 811,435 | 9528.13 |
| 41 | Arkhangelsk Oblast | Архангельская область | 1,440 | 16.91 | 1,420,276 | 16677.34 |
| 42 | Yaroslavl Oblast | Ярославская область | 1,028 | 12.07 | 869,435 | 10209.19 |
| 43 | Amur Oblast | Амурская область | 1,004 | 11.79 | 1,365,680 | 16036.26 |
| 44 | Kaliningrad Oblast | Калининградская область | 968 | 11.37 | 937,145 | 11004.26 |
| 45 | Kaluga Oblast | Калужская область | 913 | 10.72 | 855,283 | 10043.01 |
| 46 | Zabaykalsky Krai | Забайкальский край | 909 | 10.67 | 923,856 | 10848.22 |
| 47 | Astrakhan Oblast | Астраханская область | 894 | 10.5 | 944,946 | 11095.86 |
| 48 | Kursk Oblast | Курская область | 832 | 9.77 | 781,424 | 9175.73 |
| 49 | Vladimir Oblast | Владимирская область | 826 | 9.7 | 636,574 | 7474.86 |
| 50 | Tver Oblast | Тверская область | 826 | 9.7 | 699,809 | 8217.38 |
| 51 | Ulyanovsk Oblast | Ульяновская область | 782 | 9.18 | 669,091 | 7856.68 |
| 52 | Republic of Crimea | Республика Крым | 773 | 9.08 | 407,576 | 4785.89 |
| 53 | Bryansk Oblast | Брянская область | 724 | 8.5 | 636,574 | 7474.86 |
| 54 | Kirov Oblast | Кировская область | 715 | 8.4 | 635,116 | 7457.74 |
| 55 | Ryazan Oblast | Рязанская область | 441 | 5.18 | 415,807 | 4882.54 |
| 56 | Penza Oblast | Пензенская область | 400 | 4.7 | 321,296 | 3772.76 |
| 57 | Smolensk Oblast | Смоленская область | 394 | 4.63 | 448,225 | 5263.2 |
| 58 | Chuvashia | Чувашия | 377 | 4.43 | 323,281 | 3796.07 |
| 59 | Tambov Oblast | Тамбовская область | 374 | 4.39 | 394,402 | 4631.2 |
| 60 | Nenets Autonomous Okrug | Ненецкий автономный округ | 372 | 4.37 | 8,610,659 | 101109.16 |
| 61 | Khakassia | Хакасия | 492 | 5.78 | 749,962 | 8806.3 |
| 62 | Kamchatka Krai | Камчатский край | 465 | 5.46 | 1,496,824 | 17576.19 |
| 63 | Karelia | Карелия | 420 | 4.93 | 919,389 | 10795.76 |
| 64 | Oryol Oblast | Орловская область | 411 | 4.83 | 639,832 | 7513.12 |
| 65 | Kostroma Oblast | Костромская область | 401 | 4.71 | 757,212 | 8891.43 |
| 66 | Novgorod Oblast | Новгородская область | 351 | 4.12 | 657,581 | 7721.53 |
| 67 | Mordovia | Мордовия | 346 | 4.06 | 499,390 | 5864 |
| 68 | Mari El | Марий Эл | 322 | 3.78 | 489,530 | 5748.22 |
| 69 | Pskov Oblast | Псковская область | 321 | 3.77 | 573,959 | 6739.61 |
| 70 | Kurgan Oblast | Курганская область | 317 | 3.72 | 415,391 | 4877.66 |
| 71 | Kabardino-Balkaria | Кабардино-Балкария | 315 | 3.7 | 381,560 | 4480.4 |
| 72 | Ivanovo Oblast | Ивановская область | 304 | 3.57 | 344,807 | 4048.84 |
| 73 | Sevastopol | Севастополь | 284 | 3.33 | 537,131 | 6307.17 |
| 74 | North Ossetia–Alania | Северная Осетия — Алания | 281 | 3.3 | 415,739 | 4881.74 |
| 75 | Adygea | Адыгея | 237 | 2.78 | 478,723 | 5621.32 |
| 76 | Chukotka Autonomous Okrug | Чукотский автономный округ | 224 | 2.63 | 4,167,419 | 48935.19 |
| 77 | Karachay-Cherkessia | Карачаево-Черкесия | 137 | 1.61 | 347,710 | 4082.92 |
| 78 | Altai Republic | Республика Алтай | 131 | 1.54 | 623,315 | 7319.17 |
| 79 | Jewish Autonomous Oblast | Еврейская автономная область | 114 | 1.34 | 786,447 | 9234.72 |
| 80 | Ingushetia | Ингушетия | 109 | 1.28 | 204,565 | 2402.07 |
| 81 | Karachay-Cherkessia | Карачаево-Черкесия | 137 | 1.61 | 347,710 | 4082.92 |
| 82 | Altai Republic | Республика Алтай | 131 | 1.54 | 623,315 | 7319.17 |
| 83 | Jewish Autonomous Oblast | Еврейская автономная область | 114 | 1.34 | 786,447 | 9234.72 |
| 84 | Ingushetia | Ингушетия | 109 | 1.28 | 204,565 | 2402.07 |
| 85 | Tuva | Тыва | 104 | 1.22 | 312,231 | 3666.32 |

== See also ==
- List of federal subjects of Russia by GDP per capita
- List of Russian federal districts by GDP
