= Igor Vladimirovich Panshin =

Russian administrator (born 1963)

Igor Panshin
- Игорь Паньшин
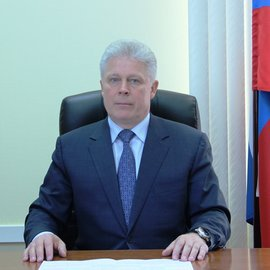
- Panshin in 2018

Presidential Envoy to the Volga Federal District
- Acting; 24 August 2018 – 7 September 2018
- Preceded by: Mikhail Babich
- Succeeded by: Igor Komarov

Personal details
- Born: March 19, 1963 (age 63)
- Party: United Russia

Igor Vladimirovich Panshin (born March 19, 1963) is a Russian administrator. On November 6, 2014 he became Colonel-General of Internal Service.

== Early life ==
He graduated in 1982 from Sormovo Engineering College.

Beginning in October 1982, he served in the State Fire Supervision Ministry of the USSR. In 1985 he graduated from the Ivanovo Fire and Technical School of the Ministry of Internal Affairs of the USSR. Since June 1985, he has served as the chief of the guard of the 30th paramilitary fire department of the 38th Main Directorate of Fire Department of the Ministry of Internal Affairs. In August 1986 he was sent to study. Being a cadet, as part of the combined detachment, he participated in the cleanup of the Spitak earthquake.

In 1990 he graduated from the Higher Engineering Fire and Technical School of the USSR Ministry of Internal Affairs. In August 1990 he was appointed deputy chief of the 24th militarized fire department. In April 1992, he became head of the detachment of the HPV fire department of the Fire Safety Department 38 of the Ministry of Internal Affairs of Russia. In April 1993, he became head of the 11th detachment of the paramilitary fire service of the PASSR of the Nizhny Novgorod region.

Beginning in July 1994, he served in the Department of the State Fire Service of the Department of Internal Affairs of the Nizhny Novgorod Region: his roles included Deputy Head of the Department of Fire and Rescue Technology, (September 1997 – 2000), Deputy Head of the Department – Head of the Fire Department, (June 2000 – 2002), Deputy Head of the Department (March 2002 – July 2002), Head of the Office of the State Fire Service of the Central Internal Affairs Directorate of the Nizhny Novgorod Region. In July 2002, the State Fire Service was transferred from the Ministry of Internal Affairs to the Ministry of Emergency Situations (EMERCOM) of Russia. He was appointed Deputy Chief of the Main Directorate for Civil Defense and Emergency Situations of the Nizhny Novgorod Region and Head of the State Fire Service.

From June to November 2003 he was Deputy Minister for Training and Personnel Training of the Ministry of Emergencies of the Republic of Bashkortostan. In November 2003 he was appointed Head of the Main Directorate of the Ministry for Emergencies of Russia for the Nizhny Novgorod region. In 2004 he graduated from the Higher Academic Courses at the Military Academy of the General Staff of the Armed Forces of the Russian Federation, and in 2014 from the International Law Institute. He was appointed Candidate of Military Sciences in 2005.

In October 2008 he became head of the Volga regional center of the Ministry of Emergencies of Russia. In June 2012, he was dismissed from military service and assigned by the head of the Privolzhsky Regional Center of the Ministry of Emergency Measures of Russia. In 2015–2016, he was subjected to pressure from the Minister of the Ministry of Emergency Measures, V.A. Puchkov; he tried to get the cancellation of disciplinary sanctions imposed on him by the Minister in January 201, but in February 2017, he was released from his post.

Almost immediately, in March 2017, he was appointed Deputy Plenipotentiary Representative of the President of Russia in the Volga Federal District. On August 24, 2018 he was promoted to Plenipotentiary Representative

He became Major-General of Internal Service in 2004. He was promoted to Lieutenant General of Internal Service on 9.06.2012. He became Colonel-General of Internal Service on 11.06.2014. He was appointed state adviser of the Russian Federation of the 2nd class (September 1, 2017).
