= Grigory Rapota =

Russian politician

- Григорий Рапота
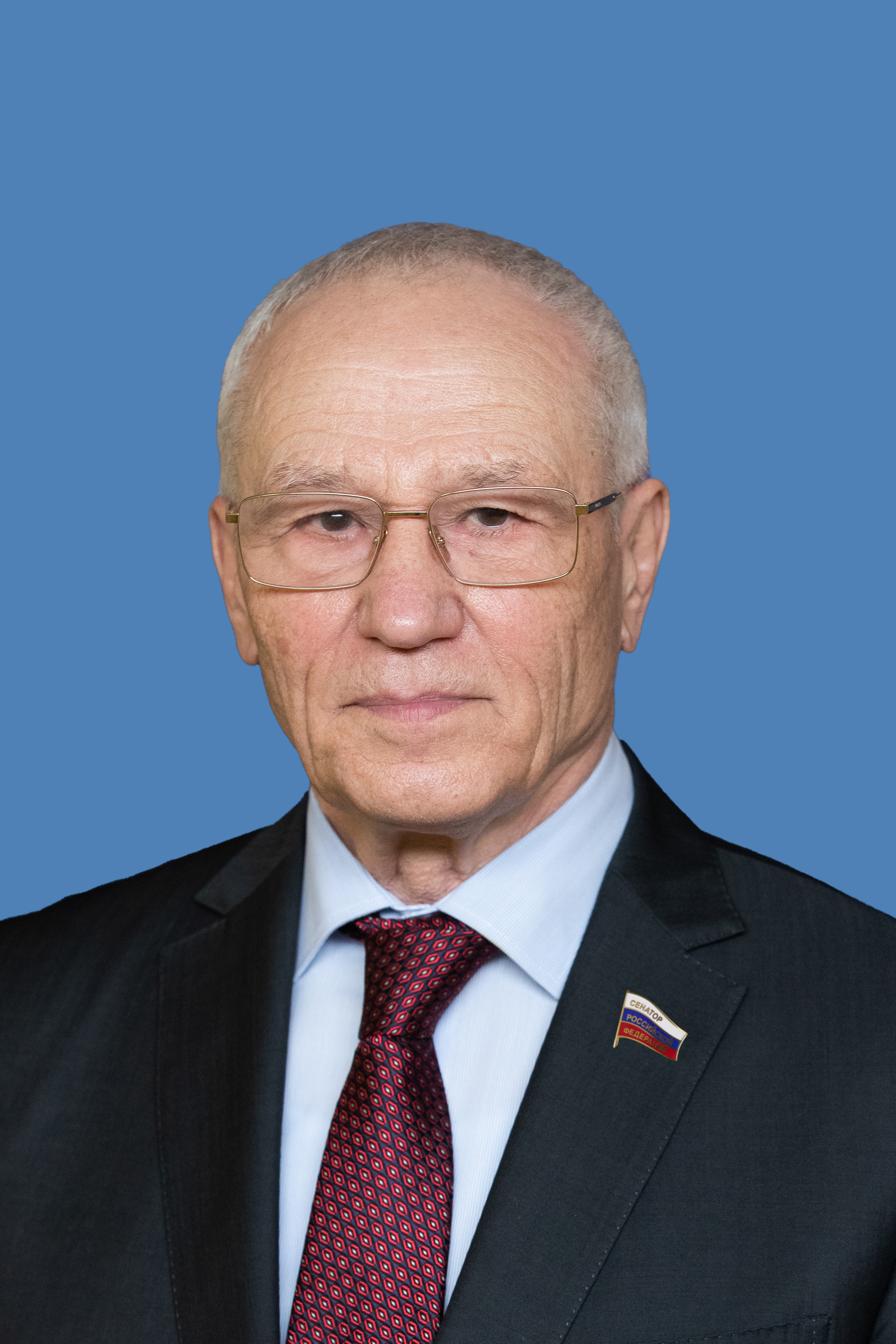
- Official portrait, 2021

Senator from Kursk Oblast
- Incumbent
- Assumed office 17 May 2021
- Preceded by: Alexander Mikhailov

Presidential Envoy to the Volga Federal District
- In office 12 May 2008 – 15 December 2011
- President: Dmitry Medvedev
- Preceded by: Aleksandr Konovalov
- Succeeded by: Mikhail Babich

Presidential Envoy to the South Federal District
- In office 9 October 2007 – 14 May 2008
- President: Vladimir Putin; Dmitry Medvedev
- Preceded by: Dmitry Kozak
- Succeeded by: Vladimir Ustinov

Personal details
- Born: 5 February 1944 (age 82) Moscow, Russian SFSR, Soviet Union
- Party: United Russia
- Education: Bauman Moscow State Technical University; Krasnoznamenny Institute of the KGB of the USSR

Grigory Alekseevich Rapota (Russian: Григорий Алексеевич Рапота; born 5 February 1944) is a Russian politician who currently serves as a Senator from the executive authority of Kursk Oblast. Prior to his appointment, he was the special representative of the Russian president in the Volga Federal District between 2008 and 2011. Before that he was the special representative of the Russian president in the Southern Federal District (North Caucasus and southern European Russia). He has the federal state civilian service rank of 1st class Active State Councillor of the Russian Federation.

He was state secretary of the Union State of Russia and Belarus between 2011 and 2021.

== Biography ==
Grigory Rapota was born in Moscow. His father was a serviceman and aviator. His mother was a teacher by education, but due to constant travels in the service of her husband she had to work not only in school, but also as a librarian, and in a savings bank.

He graduated from Bauman Moscow State Technical University in 1966 with a degree in engineering design, later graduated from the Krasnoznamenny Institute of the KGB of the USSR.

From 1966 to 1990 he worked in the First Main Directorate of the KGB (foreign intelligence), was on long missions in the US, Sweden and Finland, from 1990 to 1994 – deputy chief, head of the CCGT department. From 1994 to 1998, he served as Deputy Director of the Foreign Intelligence Service of Russia, oversaw partnerships with foreign intelligence agencies.

From April to November 1998 – Deputy Secretary of the Security Council of Russia, from November 1998 to September 1999 – General Director of the state company Rosvooruzhenie. From September 1999 to May 2000 – First Deputy Minister of Trade of Russia, engaged in military-technical cooperation. From June 2000 to October 2001 – First Deputy Minister of Science, Industry and Technology. From October 2001 to October 2007 – Secretary General of the Eurasian Economic Community. As the general director of Rosoboronexport, he significantly influenced the contract for the supply of Tor-M1 systems to Greece, a member of NATO, which is estimated as a significant contribution to the fight against the American monopoly on the supply of arms in Europe. Greece is the only NATO state in which the entire air defense system of the country and the armed forces consists only of Russian anti-aircraft and anti-missile defense complexes.

On 9 October 2007 he was appointed plenipotentiary representative of the President of the Russian Federation in the Southern Federal District, and from 14 May 2008 – Plenipotentiary Representative of the President of the Russian Federation in the Privolzhsky Federal District. Until 2011, Rapota worked as Plenipotentiary of the President, violating the law of the Russian Federation (amendment on the maximum age of employees).

Diplomatic posts
Preceded by ?	Secretary-General of the Eurasian Economic Community; October 2002 – October 2007	Succeeded by Tair Mansurov
Preceded by Dmitry Kozak	Presidential Envoy to the Southern Federal District; 9 October 2007 – 12 May 2008	Succeeded by Vladimir Ustinov
Preceded by Aleksandr Konovalov	Presidential Envoy to the Volga Federal District; 12 May 2008 – 15 December 2011	Succeeded by Mikhail Babich
