= Mikhail Babich =

Russian politician and diplomat

- Михаил Бабич
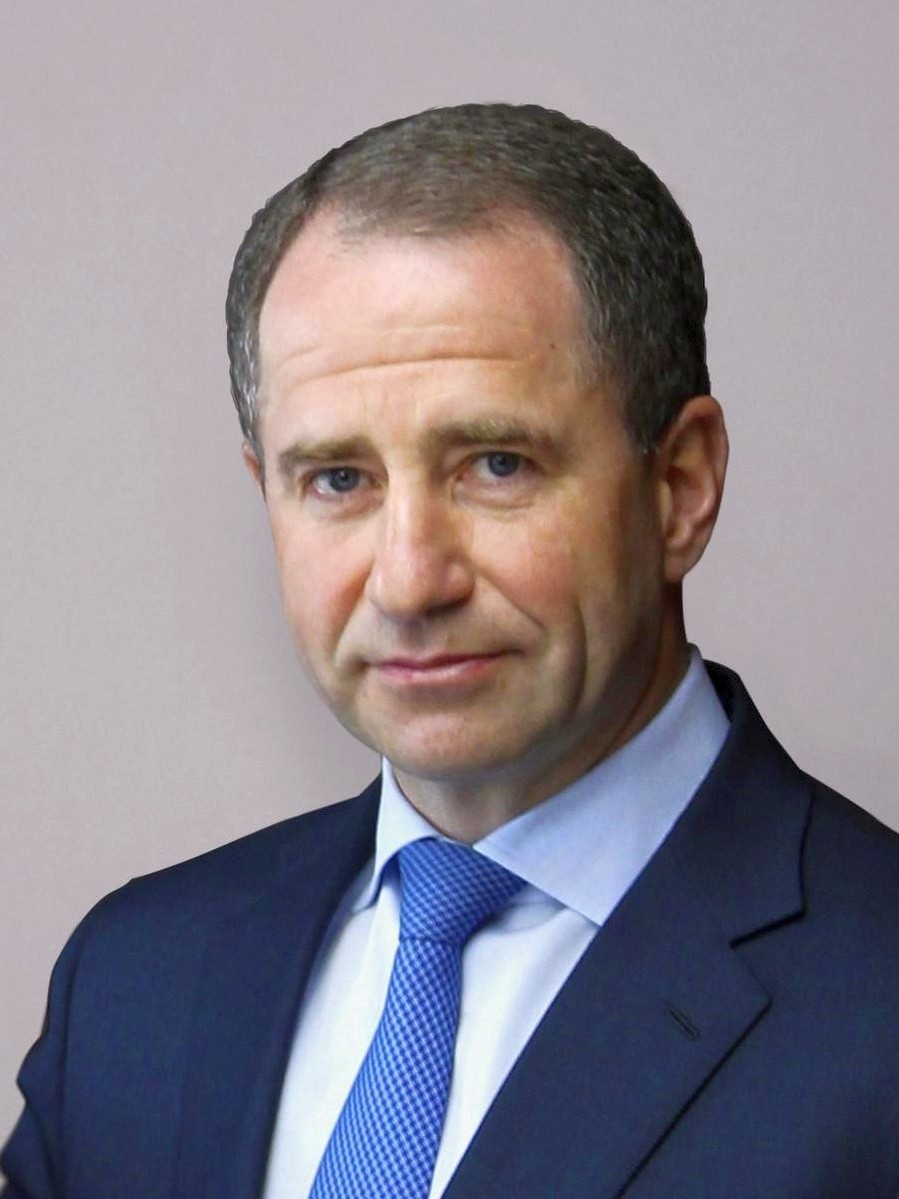
- Babich in 2019

Russian Ambassador to Belarus
- In office 24 August 2018 – 30 April 2019
- Preceded by: Alexander Surikov
- Succeeded by: Dmitry Mezentsev

Presidential Envoy to the Volga Federal District
- In office 15 December 2011 – 24 August 2018
- President: Dmitry Medvedev; Vladimir Putin
- Preceded by: Grigory Rapota
- Succeeded by: Igor Panshin (acting} Igor Komarov

Prime Minister of Chechen Republic
- In office 13 November 2002 – 8 February 2003
- Preceded by: Stanislav Ilyasov
- Succeeded by: Anatoly Popov

Personal details
- Born: May 28, 1969 (age 57) Ryazan, RSFSR, USSR
- Party: United Russia

Mikhail Viktorovich Babich (Russian: Михаил Викторович Бабич; born 28 May 1969) is a Russian politician and diplomat. Russian Ambassador to Belarus in 2018–2019.

Previously he was the Presidential Envoy to the Volga Federal District from 2011 to 2018 and member of the State Duma from 2003 and 2011.

He has the federal state civilian service rank of 1st class Active State Councillor of the Russian Federation.

== Biography ==
From 1986 to 1995 he served in the Airborne Forces and the KGB. From 1995 to 1998 he headed the CJSC "Antey Corporation" in Moscow.

From 1998 to 1999 - First Vice President of Rosmyasomoltorg. In 1999, he joined the civil service. From 1999 to January 2000 he was First Deputy General Director of the State Unitary Enterprise "Federal Agency for Regulation of the Food Market" under the Ministry of Agriculture and Food of the Russian Federation.

From 2000 to 2001 - First Deputy Chairman of the Government of the Moscow Region.

Since 2001 - the first deputy head of the Ivanovo region administration and the head of the regional office in Moscow and worked in this position until 2002.

From November 2002 to February 2003 - Chairman of the Government of the Chechen Republic.

In 2003 he was appointed Assistant Minister of Economic Development and Trade of the Russian Federation.

December 7, 2003 he was elected to the State Duma of the Russian Federation of the fourth convocation for the Kineshma single-mandate electoral district No. 81 (Ivanovo region).

December 2, 2007 was again elected to the State Duma of the Federal Assembly of the Russian Federation of the fifth convocation on the list of the party "United Russia" (Vladimir Regional Group). In the State Duma, he was deputy chairman of the Defense Committee and a member of the Commission for the Review of Federal Budget Expenditures, aimed at ensuring the defense and state security of the Russian Federation.

December 4, 2011 was elected to the State Duma of the Federal Assembly of the Russian Federation of the sixth convocation on the list of the party "United Russia" (Vladimir Regional Group).

December 15, 2011 by Presidential Decree No. 1626 was appointed Plenipotentiary Representative of the President in the Volga Federal District.

On December 29, 2011, by the Decree of the President of the Russian Federation No. 1709, he was appointed Chairman of the State Commission for Chemical Disarmament.

Since January 19, 2012 is the first state class adviser to the Russian Federation.

On the lifting of the issue on the approval of Mikhail Babich as ambassador to Ukraine

After the dismissal of Russia's ambassador to Ukraine Mikhail Zurabov on July 28, 2016, in the Russian press Mikhail Babich was named as a candidate for this post, which was publicly confirmed by Dmitry Peskov, the press secretary of Russian President Vladimir Putin. Preliminary procedures for coordinating the lower and upper chambers of the parliament by the profile committees were carried out.

The corresponding decision was made at a meeting of the International Affairs Committee on July 29, 2016.

In turn, the Ukrainian expert community expressed a number of reasons why Mikhail Babich may be refused by the Ukrainian Foreign Ministry in obtaining an agronomist. One of them was that, as a member of the Security Council of the Russian Federation, Mikhail Babich in 2014 took part in the decision to support the Crimea, in his decision to secede from Ukraine and bring in [Russian peacekeepers]. [Attribution of opinion is needed] In addition, Ukrainian political scientists noted that Mikhail Babich "had previously been a military paratrooper, led the government of the republic during the Chechen war, worked in the FSB". The experts in Kyiv stated that "Babich, whose biography is connected with the Soviet KGB and the Russian FSB, is called to become the "ambassador of the war", is a "professional saboteur" and "classic Kremlin candidate for interaction with separatists in the Donbass for organizing military operations." All these "Details", in their opinion, "could become an unconditional reason for refusal in the agrarian." There were also opinions that "the Ukrainian side is severely limited in its activities in Russia and there is no need to find a Russian ambassador in Ukraine. It is enough just temporarily an attorney." On September 27, 2017, President of the Russian Federation Vladimir Putin, in a teleconference mode, heard a report by Mikhail Babich, chairman of the State Commission for Chemical Disarmament, on the completion of work on the elimination of Russian chemical weapons.

August 4, 2016 Kyiv refused to agree on the candidacy of Mikhail Babich for the post of Russian Ambassador to Ukraine. The deputy head of the Ukrainian Foreign Ministry, Elena Zerkal, said that on their initiative the issue will not be discussed in principle. "This issue is removed from the agenda," she said.

The press secretary of the President of Russia Dmitry Peskov, in turn, said that Russia still stands for the appointment of Mikhail Babich as the new head of the diplomatic mission. "This is our approach to our bilateral relations. At the same time, if the Ukrainian side decides to lower the level of our diplomatic relations and considers such a reduced regime of diplomatic communication expedient, it is the choice of the Ukrainian side," noted Dmitry Peskov.

According to the rules of international diplomatic etiquette, before the official appointment, the ambassador's candidacy passes mandatory preliminary voting with the country of destination. And only after that there is an official presentation and appointment, and not vice versa. In this case, there was no preliminary vote. In fact, the ambassador was trying to impose.

August 24, 2018 appointed ambassador of Russia to Belarus.

== Awards ==
- Order For Merit to the Fatherland 4th class (2011).
- Order of Honour (Russia)
- Order of Friendship (2006).
- Certificate of Merit of the Russian Federation.
- Medal In Commemoration of the 850th Anniversary of Moscow.
