= Vladimir Ustinov =

Russian politician

- Владимир Устинов
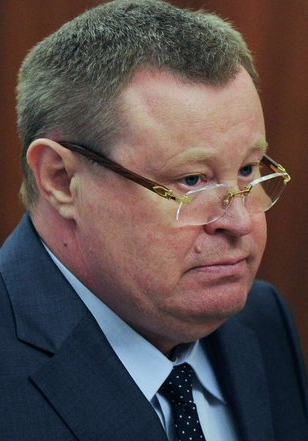
- Ustinov in 2024

Presidential Envoy to the Southern Federal District
- Incumbent
- Assumed office 14 May 2008
- President: Dmitry Medvedev; Vladimir Putin
- Preceded by: Grigory Rapota

Minister of Justice
- In office 23 June 2006 – 12 May 2008
- Prime Minister: Mikhail Fradkov; Viktor Zubkov; Vladimir Putin
- Preceded by: Yury Chaika
- Succeeded by: Aleksandr Konovalov

Prosecutor-General of Russia
- In office 17 May 2000 – 2 June 2006
- President: Vladimir Putin
- Preceded by: Yury Skuratov
- Succeeded by: Yury Chaika

Personal details
- Born: 25 February 1953 (age 73) Nikolayevsk-on-Amur, Russian SFSR, Soviet Union
- Spouse: Nadezhda Ustinova
- Children: 2
- Education: Kharkov State Law Institute
- Awards: Hero of the Russian Federation

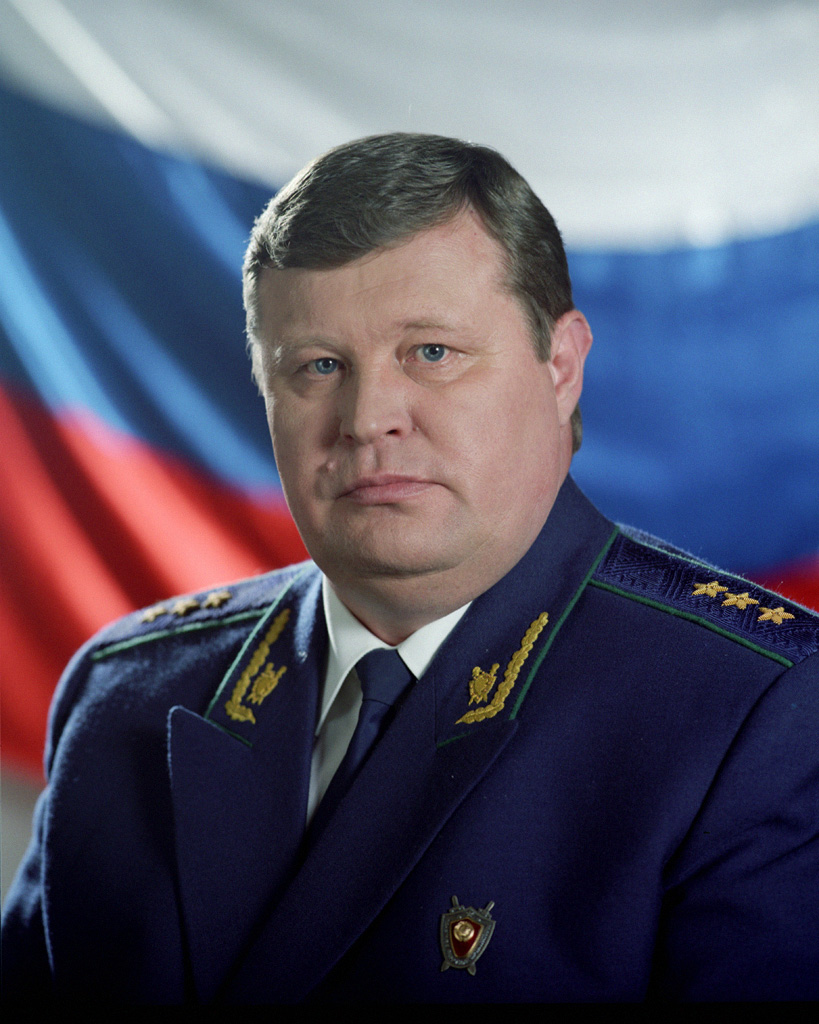
Vladimir Ustinov's official portrait as Russia's Prosecutor-General, 2000

Vladimir Vasilyevich Ustinov (Russian: Владимир Васильевич Устинов; born 25 February 1953) is a Russian lawyer and statesman. Since 2008 he is the Plenipotentiary Envoy to the Southern Federal District. Until 2008, he was Russia's Minister of Justice. He was Vladimir Putin's first General Prosecutor of Russia from 2000 to June 2006.

He has the prosecutor's rank of Active State Councillor of Justitia and the federal state civilian service rank of 1st class Active State Councillor of the Russian Federation.

== High-profile cases ==
- Investigation into Russian apartment bombings in Moscow and Volgodonsk (1999)
- The case of Media-Most and Vladimir Gusinsky (2000)
- The case of Chechen terrorist Salman Raduyev (2000-2001), for the first time in the history of modern Russia, the Prosecutor-General acted as a public prosecutor at the trial
- Investigation of the sinking of the nuclear submarine Kursk (2000 - 2002)
- Nord-Ost (2002)
- Yukos case (2003-2005)
- Criminal prosecution of former Ukrainian Prime Minister Yulia Tymoshenko (2004-2005)
- Three Whales Corruption Scandal (2000-2006)

== Personal life ==
He is married to a housewife, Nadezhda Aleksandrovna Ustinova (Russian: Надежда Александровна Устинова), and they have a son, Dmitry, and a daughter, Irina.

Dmitry Ustinov (Russian: Дмитрий Владимирович Устинов b. 1979) is a Russian intelligence agent and graduate of the FSB Academy. Dmitry Ustinov married Inga Sechina, a daughter of Igor Sechin, on 22 November 2003. Dmitry and Inga have a son born 4 July 2005. As of 2014, Dmitry and Inga are divorced.

Irina Dmitrievna Ustinova (Russian: Ирина Дмитриевна Устинова), in 2010, lived in Sochi and is an assistant prosecutor in south Russia's Khostinsky district (Russian: Хостинский район), a district of the city of Sochi.

=== Sanctions ===
In April 2018, the United States imposed sanctions on him and 23 other Russian nationals. In response to the 2022 Russian invasion of Ukraine, on 6 April 2022 the Office of Foreign Assets Control of the United States Department of the Treasury added Ustinov to its list of persons sanctioned pursuant to Executive Order 14024 as well.

He was sanctioned by the UK government in 2022 in relation to Russo-Ukrainian War.

== Honours and awards ==
- Hero of the Russian Federation — by secret presidential decree, publicised in spring, 2005, by the President of the State Duma, Alexander Kotenkov
- Order of Merit for the Fatherland, 3rd class (4 December 1999) — for his great personal contribution to strengthening the rule of law in the Republic of Dagestan
- Order of Merit for the Fatherland, 2nd class
- Order of Merit for the Fatherland, 4th class
- Order of Alexander Nevsky
- Order of Courage, twice
- Honoured Lawyer of the Russian Federation (9 January 1997)
- Order of Saint Blessed Prince Dimitry Donskoy great, 1st class
- Order of Holy Prince Daniel of Moscow — attention to work for the benefit of the Russian Orthodox Church and in connection with the 60th anniversary of his birth

== Works ==
- Vladimir Ustinov. Indictment of Terror. 192 pp. Olma-Press Publishers, Moscow, 2003. ISBN 5-224-04468-5.

== See also ==
- List of Heroes of the Russian Federation
- Three Whales Corruption Scandal

Legal offices
Preceded by Yury Chaika	Prosecutor General of Russia; 29 July 1999 – 2 June 2006	Succeeded by Yury Chaika
Government offices
Preceded by Yury Chaika	Justice Minister of Russia; 24 June 2006 – 12 May 2008	Succeeded by Aleksandr Konovalov
Diplomatic posts
Preceded by Grigory Rapota	Presidential Envoy to the Southern Federal District; 12 May 2008	Succeeded by Incumbent
