= Yury Chaika =

Russian jurist and politician

- Юрий Чайка
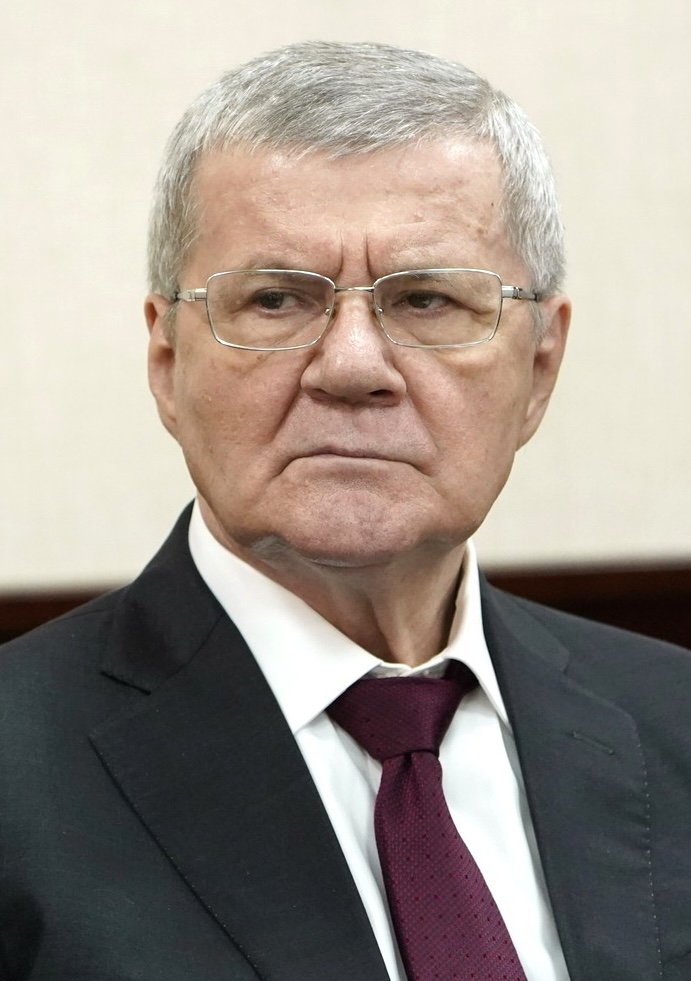
- Chaika in 2023

Presidential Envoy to the North Caucasian Federal District
- Incumbent
- Assumed office 22 January 2020
- President: Vladimir Putin
- Preceded by: Aleksandr Matovnikov

Prosecutor-General of Russia
- In office 23 June 2006 – 22 January 2020
- President: Vladimir Putin; Dmitry Medvedev; Vladimir Putin
- Preceded by: Vladimir Ustinov
- Succeeded by: Igor Krasnov
- In office 2 April – 29 July 1999; Acting
- President: Boris Yeltsin
- Preceded by: Yury Skuratov
- Succeeded by: Vladimir Ustinov

Minister of Justice
- In office 17 August 1999 – 23 June 2006
- President: Boris Yeltsin; Vladimir Putin
- Prime Minister: Vladimir Putin; Mikhail Kasyanov; Mikhail Fradkov
- Preceded by: Pavel Krasheninnikov
- Succeeded by: Vladimir Ustinov

Personal details
- Born: 21 May 1951 (age 75) Nikolayevsk-on-Amur, Russian SFSR, Soviet Union
- Education: Ural State Law University
- Occupation: Lawyer

Yury Yakovlevich Chaika (Russian: Юрий Яковлевич Чайка; born 21 May 1951) is a Russian lawyer and statesman who currently serves as the Presidential Envoy to the North Caucasian Federal District since 2020. He previously served as Prosecutor-General of Russia from 2006 to 2020 and Minister of Justice from 1999 to 2006.

He has the federal state civilian service ranks of State Councillor of Justice of the Russian Federation and 1st class Active State Councillor of the Russian Federation, and also the prosecutor's rank of Active State Councillor of Justitia.

== Career ==
In 1995, he became first deputy Russian prosecutor general. He was appointed by then Prosecutor-General Yury Skuratov, his former classmate from Sverdlovsk Law Institute. Following Skuratov's suspension, Chaika served as acting prosecutor general for a brief spell between April and August 1999. From August 1999 to June 2006, he served as justice minister.

On 23 June 2006, Chaika became Russian Prosecutor-General, effectively swapping jobs with his predecessor Vladimir Ustinov who took up the post of justice minister.

A "Crown prosecutor" (likely a reference to Chaika) was mentioned in an email chain released on 11 July 2017 by the son of then Republican Presidential nominee Donald Trump, Don Jr, in regards to the Russian government and their alleged attempts to provide damaging information during the U.S. Presidential election of 2016. The email thread resulted in the Trump campaign–Russian meeting of June 2016.

On 20 January 2020, he resigned in connection with the transition to another job. The resignation request is expected to be considered by the Federation Council on 22 January.

On 22 January 2020 he was appointed Presidential Plenipotentiary Envoy to North Caucasus Federal District.

== Notable cases ==
On 14 June 2006, the Prosecutor-General's Office reported that it had reopened the "Three Whales" corruption investigation, a case in which nineteen high-ranking FSB (Federal Security Service) officers were allegedly involved in furniture smuggling cases, as well as illegally importing consumer goods from China. The mass media revealed that the officials dismissed around that time had worked in the Moscow and federal offices of the FSB, (Note: Colonel General Sergei Shishin, former head of the Internal Security Directorate of FSB and current head of the FSB Activities Support Directorate, Colonel General Vladimir Anisimov, former head of the Internal Security Directorate of FSB, Lieutenant General Alexander Kupryazhkin, current head of the Internal Security Directorate.) the Prosecutor-General's Office, (Note: Prosecutors Dmitry Shokhin and Kamil Kashaev who had prosecuted YUKOS, head of the department for Investigations of High Importance Cases Vladimir Lyseiko, oversight directorates heads Alexander Kizlyk and Vladimir Titov.) the Moscow Regional Prosecutor's Office, the Federal Customs Service and the Presidential Executive Office. Deputy heads of the FSB Internal Security Department also figured in the report authored by Viktor Cherkesov. The purge occurred while FSB head Nikolai Patrushev was on vacation.

On 27 December 2006, he accused Leonid Nevzlin, a former vice president of Yukos, exiled in Israel and wanted by the Russian authorities for a long time, of involvement in Alexander Litvinenko poisoning, a charge dismissed by the latter as a nonsense.

On 16 January 2007, Chaika announced that the Tambov Gang had recently forcefully taken over 13 large enterprises in Saint Petersburg and was subject to an investigation. The leader of the gang, Vladimir Kumarin, was arrested on 24 August 2007. His associate and member of Putin's cooperative "Ozero" Vladimir Smirnov was dismissed from his position of Tekhsnabexport director.

On 1 December 2015, Alexei Navalny's Anti-Corruption Foundation (FBK) published a large investigation on Yuri Chaika, and his family. The Report comes with a 40-minute film Chaika. An English version of the film was published two months later. On 3 February 2016, the group Pussy Riot released a satirical music video titled Chaika, alluding to Navalny's findings.

On March 15, 2017, the Ministry of Justice in Russia filed a claim with the Supreme Court of the Russian Federation seeking "to declare the religious organization, the Administrative Center of Jehovah’s Witnesses, extremist, ban its activity, and liquidate it." Yury Chaika will be heading the prosecution.

== Sanctions ==
In response to the 2022 Russian invasion of Ukraine, on 6 April 2022 the Office of Foreign Assets Control of the United States Department of the Treasury added Chaika to its list of persons sanctioned pursuant to Executive Order 14024.

In July 2022 the European Union imposed sanctions on Chaika in relation to the 2022 Russian invasion of Ukraine.

He was sanctioned by the UK government in 2022 in relation to the Russo-Ukrainian War.

== Popular culture ==
In 2016 Russian punk music group Pussy Riot released the music video "Chaika", sardonically commenting on corruption in the Russian judiciary. The song itself does not directly refer to Chaika, but the music video features women wearing seagull masks or making hand gestures of a seagull in dance (chaika (чайка) is the Russian word for seagull).

== Awards ==
- Order of Honour — for great contribution to strengthening the rule of law and many years of conscientious work (2001)
- Order "For Merit to the Fatherland" IV class — for services to the state in strengthening law and order (2006)
- Order "For Merit to the Fatherland" III class — for great services to the state in strengthening law and order (2011)
- Russian Federation Presidential Certificate of Honour — for services in strengthening the rule of law, protection of the rights and legitimate interests of citizens (2011)
- Order of Honour (South Ossetia, 2011)
- Order of Honour — for significant contribution to Armenian-Russian cooperation in the field of justice (Armenia, 2013)
- Order of Friendship — for significant contribution to the deepening of cooperation between the law enforcement bodies of the Republic of Armenia and the Russian Federation, strengthening and development of Armenian-Russian friendly ties (Armenia, 2016)
- Order of Friendship (South Ossetia, 2017)
- Medal “100th anniversary of the Prosecutor's Office of Azerbaijan (1918-2018)” (Azerbaijan, 2019)
- Order "For Merit to the Fatherland" I class — for great contribution to ensuring the activities of the President of the Russian Federation and many years of conscientious work
- Order of Alexander Nevsky
- Order "For Merit to the Fatherland" II class
- Honoured Lawyer of Russia
- Medal "In Commemoration of the 850th Anniversary of Moscow"
- Jubilee Medal "300 Years of the Russian Navy"
- Medal of Zhukov

== See also ==
- Three Whales Corruption Scandal

Legal offices
Preceded by Vladimir Ustinov	Prosecutor-General of Russia; 23 June 2006–22 January 2020	Succeeded by Igor Krasnov
Preceded by Yury Skuratov	Prosecutor-General of Russia; Acting; 2 April – 29 July 1999	Succeeded by Vladimir Ustinov
Political offices
Preceded by Pavel Krasheninnikov	Justice Minister of Russia; 17 August 1999 – 2 June 2006	Succeeded by Vladimir Ustinov
