= Igor Komarov =

Russian industrialist and politician (born 1964)

- Игорь Комаров
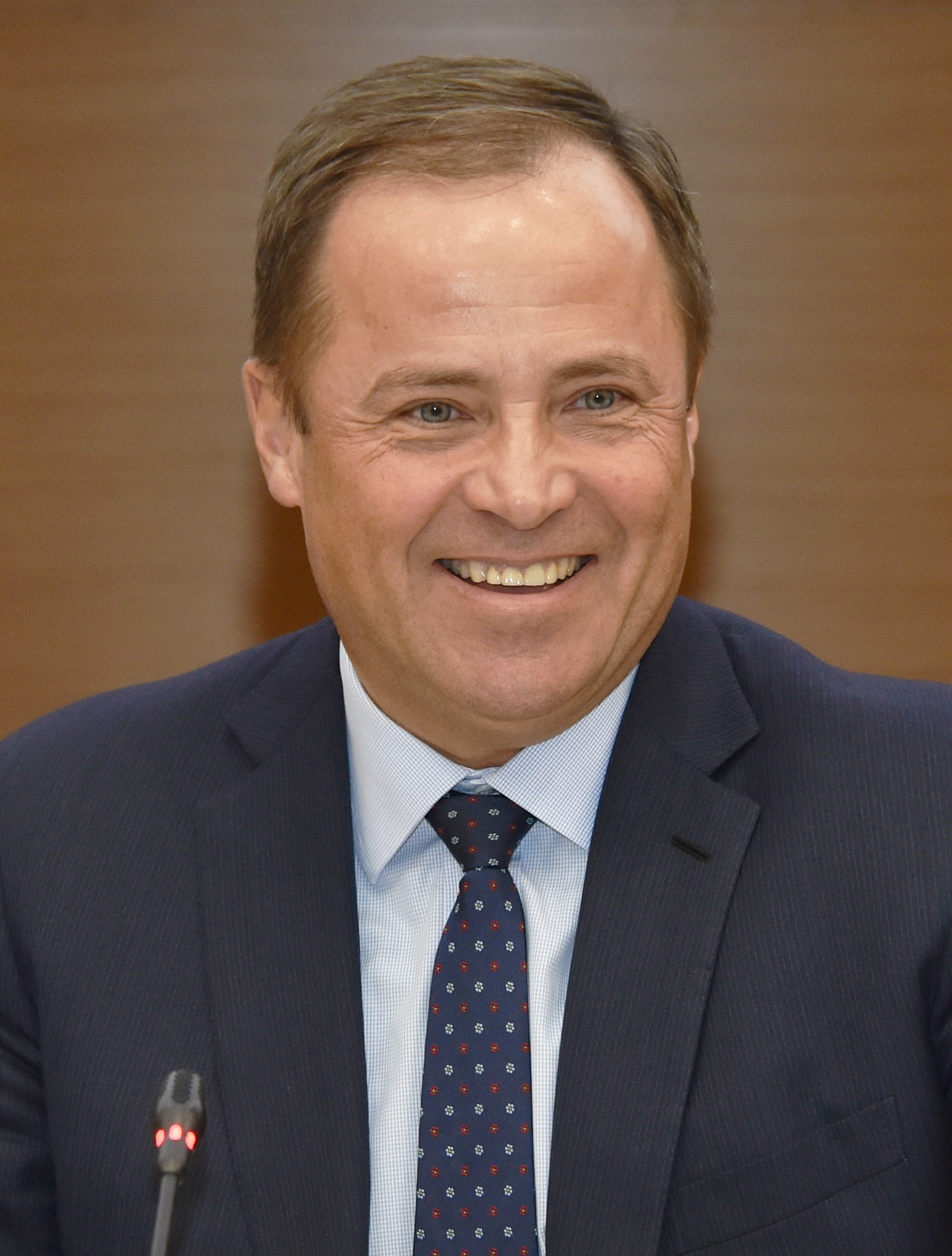
- Komarov in 2020

Presidential Envoy to the Volga Federal District
- Incumbent
- Assumed office 7 September 2018
- Preceded by: Igor Panshin (acting); Mikhail Babich

Deputy Minister of Science and Higher Education
- In office 10 July 2018 – 7 September 2018
- Prime Minister: Dmitry Medvedev
- Minister: Mikhail Kotyukov

General Director of Roscosmos
- In office 21 January 2015 – 24 May 2018
- Preceded by: Oleg Ostapenko
- Succeeded by: Dmitry Rogozin

Personal details
- Born: May 25, 1964 (age 62) Engels, Saratov Oblast, Soviet Union
- Party: United Russia

Igor Anatolyevich Komarov (born 25 May 1964) is a Russian politician, industrialist, financier and manager. He has served as Plenipotentiary Envoy of the Russian president to the Volga Federal District since 18 September 2018 (acting from 7 September to 18 September). In this position, he is a member of the Security Council of Russia.

In March 2014, he was appointed the head of the United Rocket and Space Corporation (ORKK). Komarov served as General Director of Roscosmos between January 2015 and May 2018.

He has the federal state civilian service rank of 1st class Active State Councillor of the Russian Federation.

After the start of the Russian invasion of Ukraine he was placed under sanctions in 2022 by the UK, US and other governments.

== Biography ==
Komarov was born in Engels, Saratov Oblast in 1964 and graduated from the Moscow State University with a specialty "economist".

From 1992 to 2002, he worked in credit and financial institutions in executive positions (Inkombank, National Reserve Bank, Sberbank).

From 2002 to 2008, he was Deputy General Director of Norilsk Nickel for Economics and Finance.

Since October 2008, he held the position of Adviser to the General Director of the State Corporation "Rostekhnologii", in May 2009 was appointed Executive Vice President of AVTOVAZ, and on August 28, 2009 - appointed President of this company.

On October 1, 2009, Igor Komarov was elected chairman of the Board of Directors of GM-AVTOVAZ.

On October 16, 2013, Igor Komarov announced his resignation as president of AVTOVAZ. Formally, his departure from the post of president of the car concern, he justified the transition to a new job, the president of the United Space Rocket Corporation.

During his time as President of AvtoVAZ, from 2009 to 2013, Igor Komarov and his team carried out reforms to radically reorganize the car factory.

On October 23, 2013, by the order of the chairman of the Government of the Russian Federation DA Medvedev was appointed deputy head of the Federal Space Agency (Roscosmos).

In March 2014, the government appointed the head of the United Rocket and Space Corporation.

On January 21, 2015, he headed the Roscosmos State Corporation.

On May 24, 2018, by the Decree of the president of the Russian Federation, the General Director of Roscosmos State Corporation was dismissed from office.

From July 11 to September 7, 2018 - Deputy Minister of Science and Higher Education of the Russian Federation.

=== Property and income ===
According to his tax return for 2018, he has the highest income among employees of the administration of the president of Russia - 657 million rubles. His wife's income is two million rubles. He owns seven land plots with a total area of almost 20 thousand square meters.

According to an investigation by Important Stories, Komarov's daughter Maria owns an apartment in Belgravia, London - worth about 4.2 million pounds sterling . Near this apartment are apartments worth 8.3 million pounds sterling, owned by the offshore company Wastom Holdings of the British Virgin Islands, which was founded by Igor Komarov.

=== Sanctions ===
He was sanctioned by the UK government in 2022 in relation to the Russo-Ukrainian War. On 6 April 2022, the Office of Foreign Assets Control of the United States Department of the Treasury added Komarov to its list of persons sanctioned pursuant to Executive Order 14024.

He is also under personal international sanctions from Canada, Australia, Ukraine, and New Zealand.

In 2007 he purchased a five story red brick townhouse on Herbert Crescent in central London for over $16.5 million through a British Virgin Islands-based shell company. Komarov is now listed as the beneficial owner of the shell company and the deed of the house now contains a warning restricting the sale of the property.
