= Volga Federal District =

Federal district of Russia

Coordinates: 56°20′N 44°00′E

Volga Federal District Приволжский федеральный округ
- Federal district of Russia
- The geographical location of Volga Federal District
- Interactive map of Volga Federal District
- Country: Russia
- Established: 13 May 2000
- Administrative center: Nizhny Novgorod

Government
  - Presidential Envoy: Igor Komarov

Area
  - Total: 1,038,000 km^{2} (401,000 sq mi)
  - Rank: 5th

Population (2010)
  - Total: 29,899,699
  - Rank: 2nd
  - Density: 28.8/km^{2} (75/sq mi)

GDP (nominal, 2024)
  - Total: ₽26.3 trillion (US$357.14 billion)
  - Per capita: ₽923,722 (US$12,542.05)
- Time zones: UTC+03:00 (Moscow Time)
- UTC+04:00 (Samara Time)
- UTC+05:00 (Yekaterinburg Time)
- Federal subjects: 14 contained
- Economic regions: 3 contained
- HDI (2022): 0.778 high · 4th
- Website: www.pfo.ru

Volga Federal District in Russia

Volga Federal District (Note: Russian: Приволжский федеральный округ, romanized: Privolzhskiy federal'nyy okrug, IPA: [prʲɪˈvolʂskʲɪj fʲɪdʲɪˈralʲnɨj ˈokrʊk]) is one of the eight federal districts of Russia. It forms the southeastern part of European Russia. It is the second most populated federal district (after Central). Its population was 29,899,699 (70.8% urban) according to the 2010 census, living on an area of 1,038,000 square kilometers (401,000 sq mi). Igor Komarov was appointed the federal district's Presidential Envoy on 18 September 2018.

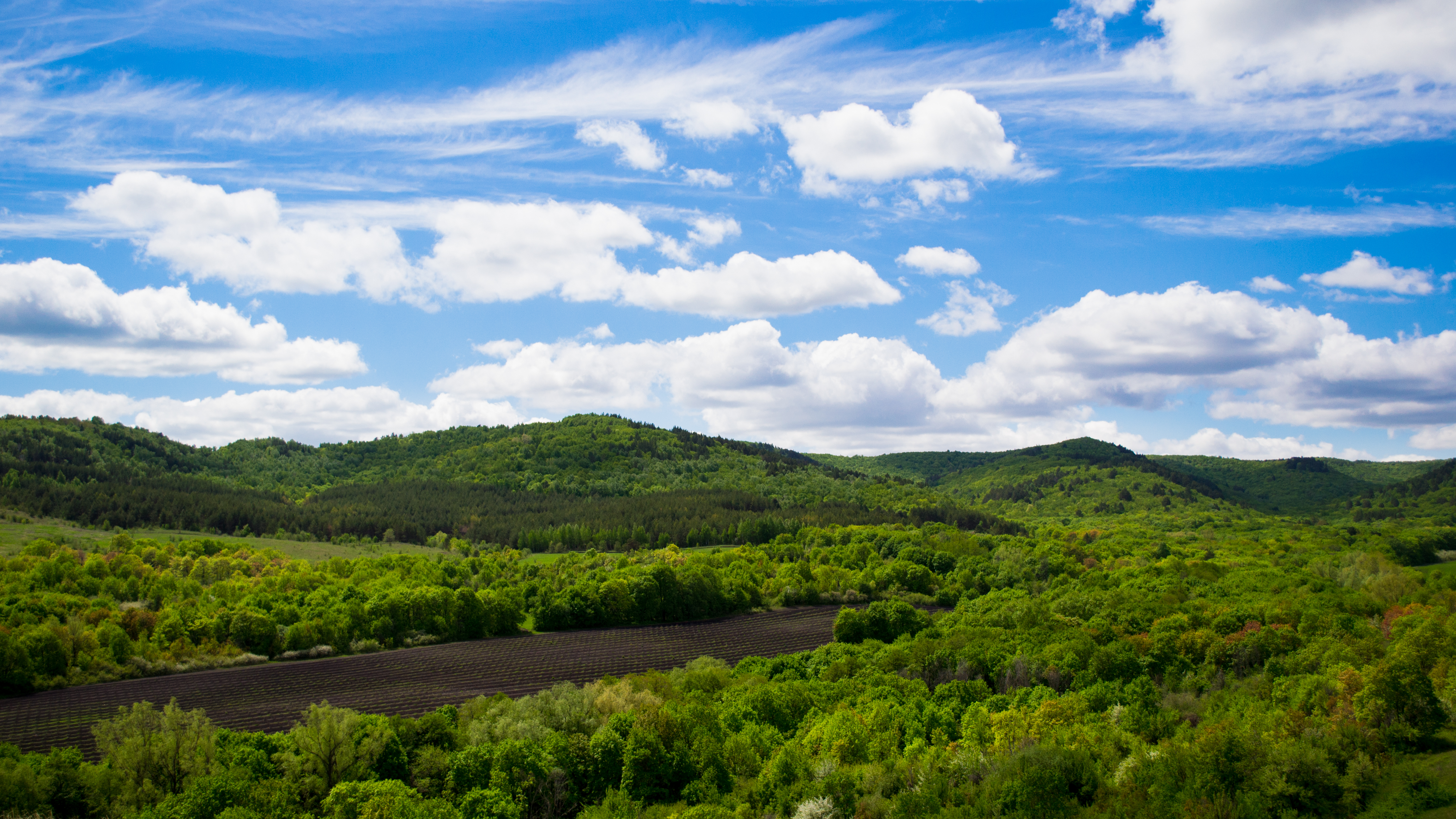
Khvalynsky national park

== Demographics ==
Population pyramid of the Volga Federal District at the 2021 Russian Census

=== Federal subjects ===
The district comprises the Volga (part), Volga-Vyatka and Urals (part) economic regions and fourteen federal subjects:

#	Flag	Coat of Arms	Federal subject	Area in km^{2}	Population (2021)	GDP	Capital/Administrative center	Map of Administrative Division
1			Republic of Bashkortostan	143,600	4,091,423	₽2,000 billion	Ufa	
2			Kirov Oblast	120,800	1,153,680	₽481 billion	Kirov	
3			Mari El Republic	23,200	677,097	₽222 billion	Yoshkar-Ola	
4			Republic of Mordovia	26,200	783,552	₽298 billion	Saransk	
5			Nizhny Novgorod Oblast	76,900	3,119,115	₽1,888 billion	Nizhny Novgorod	
6			Orenburg Oblast	124,000	1,862,767	₽1,394 billion	Orenburg	
7			Penza Oblast	43,200	1,266,348	₽537 billion	Penza	
8			Perm Krai	160,600	2,532,405	₽1,741 billion	Perm	
9			Samara Oblast	53,600	3,172,925	₽2,123 billion	Samara	
10			Saratov Oblast	100,200	2,442,575	₽1,006 billion	Saratov	
11			Republic of Tatarstan	68,000	4,004,809	₽3,455 billion	Kazan	
12			Udmurt Republic	42,100	1,452,914	₽842 billion	Izhevsk	
13			Ulyanovsk Oblast	37,300	1,196,745	₽499 billion	Ulyanovsk	
14			Chuvash Republic	18,300	1,186,909	₽393 billion	Cheboksary	

Ethnic composition, according to the 2010 census: Total – 29,899,699 people.

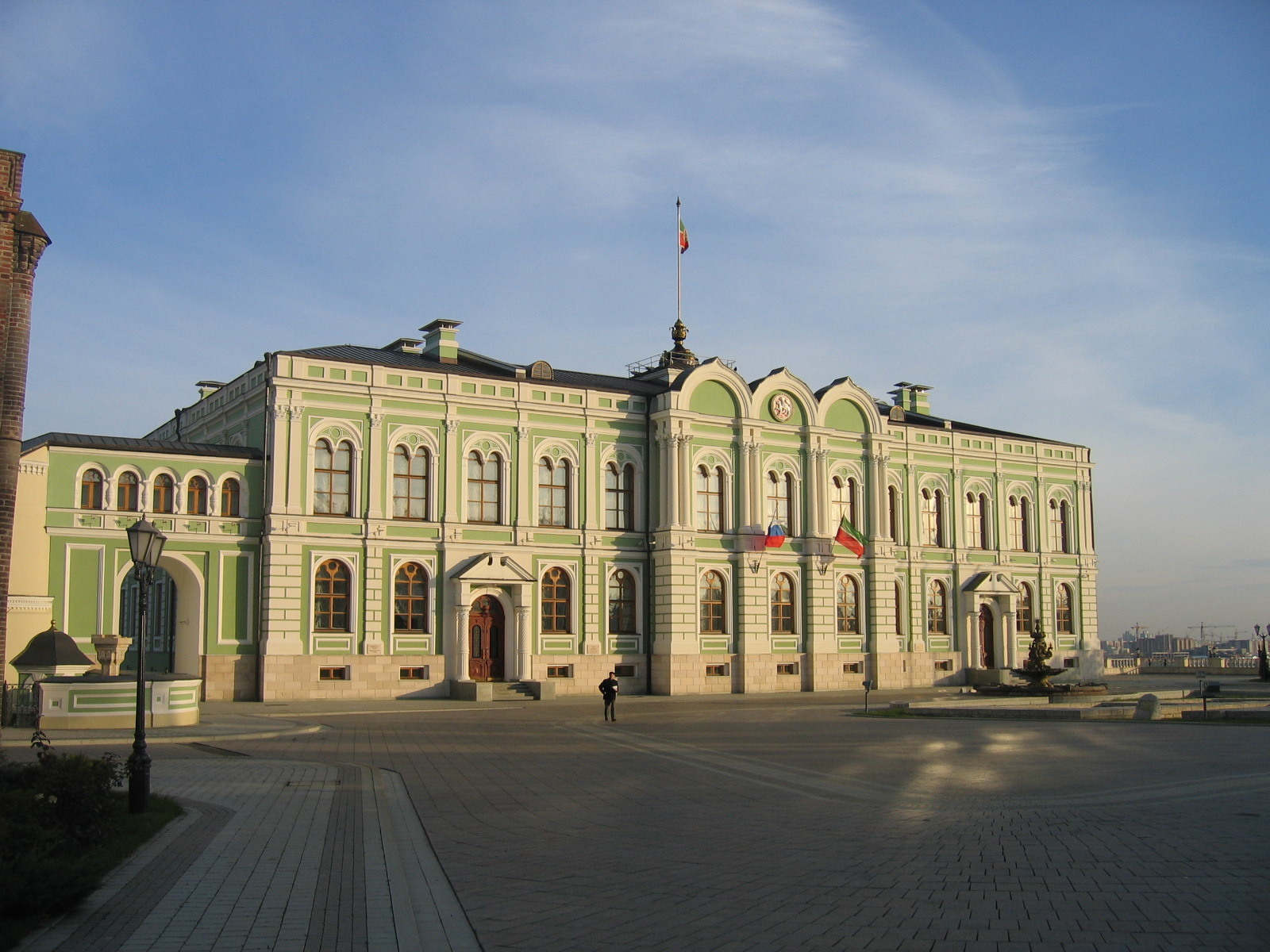
Presidential palace in Kazan, Tatarstan

Russians – 19,811,351 (66.26%)

Tatars – 3,999,568 (13.38%)

Bashkirs – 1,282,794 (4.29%)

Chuvash – 1,272,790 (4.26%)

Mordva – 617,050 (2.06%)

Udmurts – 497,214 (1.66%)

Mari – 473 015 (1.58%)

Ukrainians – 272 385 (0.91%)

Kazakhs – 221,047 (0.74%)

Armenians – 108,774 (0.36%)

Komi-Perm – 82 979 (0.28%)

Azerbaijanis – 80 727 (0.27%)

Belarusians – 62,560 (0.21%)

Uzbeks – 50 523 (0.17%)

Germans – 48,211 (0.16%)

Tajiks – 33 463 (0.11%)

Roma – 28,270 (0.09%)

Jews – 20 968 (0.07%)

Moldovans – 15,548 (0.05%)

Georgians – 13 534 (0.05%)

Koreans – 12,215 (0.04%)

Chechens – 11,828 (0.04%)

Lezgins – 10 636 (0.04%)

Individuals who did not indicate nationality – 771,435 (2.92%)

== Presidential plenipotentiary envoys ==
No.	Name (envoy)	Photo	Term of office			Appointed by
No.	Name (envoy)	Photo	Start of term	End of term	Length of service	Appointed by
1	Sergey Kiriyenko		18 May 2000	14 November 2005	5 years, 180 days (2,006 days)	Vladimir Putin
2	Aleksandr Konovalov		14 November 2005	12 May 2008	2 years, 180 days (910 days)	Vladimir Putin
3	Grigory Rapota		12 May 2008	15 December 2011	3 years, 217 days (1,312 days)	Dmitry Medvedev
4	Mikhail Babich		15 December 2011	24 August 2018	6 years, 252 days (2,444 days)	Dmitry Medvedev
–	Igor Panshin (acting)		24 August 2018	7 September 2018	14 days	Vladimir Putin
5	Igor Komarov		7 September 2018	present	8 years, 14 days (2,936 days)	Vladimir Putin

== See also ==
- List of largest cities in Volga Federal District (in Russian)
