= Southern Federal District =

Federal district of Russia

Southern Federal District Южный федеральный округ
- Federal district
- The geographical location of Southern Federal District
- Interactive map of Southern Federal District
- Coordinates: 47°N 42°E
- Country: Russia
- Established: 13 May 2000
- Administrative centre: Rostov-on-Don
- Largest city: Krasnodar

Government
  - Presidential Envoy: Vladimir Ustinov

Area
  - Total: 447,821 km^{2} (172,905 sq mi)
  - Rank: 7th

Population (2010 Census)
  - Total: 16,319,253
  - Rank: 4th
  - Density: 36.4415/km^{2} (94.3830/sq mi)
  - Urban: 62.4%
  - Rural: 37.6%

GDP (nominal, 2024)
  - Total: ₽12.57 trillion (US$147.52 billion)
  - Per capita: ₽757,056 (US$8,883.44)
- Federal constituent entity: 6 contained (12 if including disputed oblasts and republics)
- Economic regions: 1 contained (2 if containing disputed oblasts and republics)
- HDI (2022): 0.764 high · 7th
- Website: ufo.gov.ru

The Southern Federal District (Note: Russian: Южный федеральный округ, romanized: Yuzhnyy federal'nyy okrug, IPA: [ˈjuʐnɨj fʲɪdʲɪˈralʲnɨj ˈokrʊk]) is one of the eight federal districts of Russia. Its territory lies mostly on the Pontic–Caspian steppe of Southern Russia. The Southern Federal District shares borders with Ukraine, the Azov Sea, and the Black Sea in the west, and Kazakhstan and the Caspian Sea in the east.

== History ==
The Southern Federal District was originally called the "North Caucasian Federal District" when it was founded on 13 May 2000, but was renamed for political reasons on 21 June 2000. On 19 January 2010, the Southern Federal District was split in two, with its former southern territories forming a new North Caucasian Federal District.

On 28 July 2016, Crimean Federal District (which contains the Republic of Crimea and the Federal city of Sevastopol) was abolished and merged into Southern Federal District in order to "improve the governance". Crimean Federal District was established on 21 March 2014 after the Annexation of Crimea by the Russian Federation. The federal district includes both the Republic of Crimea and the federal city of Sevastopol, both recognized as part of Ukraine by most of the international community. Its population was 13,854,334 (62.4% urban) according to the 2010 Census, living in an area of 420,900 square kilometers (162,500 sq mi).

== Demographics ==
Population pyramid of the Southern Federal District at the 2021 Russian Census

=== Federal constituent entities ===
An official government translation of the constitution of Russia from Russian to English uses the term "constituent entities of the Russian Federation". For example, Article 5 reads: "The Russian Federation shall consist of republics, krays, oblasts, cities of federal significance, an autonomous oblast and autonomous okrugs, which shall have equal rights as constituent entities of the Russian Federation." A translation provided by Garant-Internet instead uses the term "subjects of the Russian Federation".

Tom Fennell, a translator, told the 2008 American Translators Association conference that "constituent entity of the Russian Federation" is a better translation than "subject". This was supported by Tamara Nekrasova, Head of Translation Department at Goltsblat BLP, saying in a 2011 presentation at a translators conference that "constituent entity of the Russian Federation is more appropriate than subject of the Russian Federation (subject would be OK for a monarchy)".

#	Flag	Coat of Arms	Constituent entities	Area in km^{2}	Population	Capital/administrative center	Map of Administrative Division
1			Republic of Adygea	7,800	496,934	Maykop	
2			Astrakhan Oblast	49,000	960,142	Astrakhan	
3			Republic of Kalmykia	74,700	267,133	Elista	
4			Krasnodar Krai	75,500	5,838,273	Krasnodar	
5			Rostov Oblast	101,000	4,200,729	Rostov-on-Don	
6			Volgograd Oblast	112,900	2,500,781	Volgograd	
Disputed territories
A			Republic of Crimea (Note: Annexed by Russia in 2014; recognized internationally as a part of Ukraine.)	26,100	1,934,630	Simferopol	
B			Sevastopol	900	547,820	Sevastopol	

== Ethnic groups ==
Ethnic composition, according to the 2010 census: Total - 13,854,334 people.

- Russians - 11,602,452 (83.75%)
- Armenians - 442,505 (3.19%)
- Ukrainians - 212,674 (1.54%)
- Kazakhs - 205,364 (1.48%)
- Kalmyks - 172,242 (1.24%)
- Tatars - 127,455 (0.92%)
- Circassians - 121,391 (0.88%)
- Azerbaijanis - 52,871 (0.38%)
- Turks - 51,367 (0.37%)
- Roma - 46,067 (0.33%)
- Belarusians - 44,723 (0.32%)
- Chechens - 34,593 (0.25%)
- Georgians - 31,018 (0.22%)
- Germans - 29,312 (0.21%)
- Koreans - 27,640 (0.20%)
- Greeks - 27,313 (0.20%)
- Dargins - 24,815 (0.18%)
- Uzbeks - 16,361 (0.12%)
- Avars - 16,061 (0.12%)
- Moldovans - 15,888 (0.11%)
- Lezgins - 15,241 (0.11%)
- Chuvash - 12,329 (0.09%)
- Kurds - 12,056 (0.09%)
- Bashkirs - 4,942 (0.06%)
- Persons who did not indicate their nationality: 240,609 people. (1.74%)
- Representatives of other nationalities: 729,572 people. (5.26%)

=== Life expectancy ===
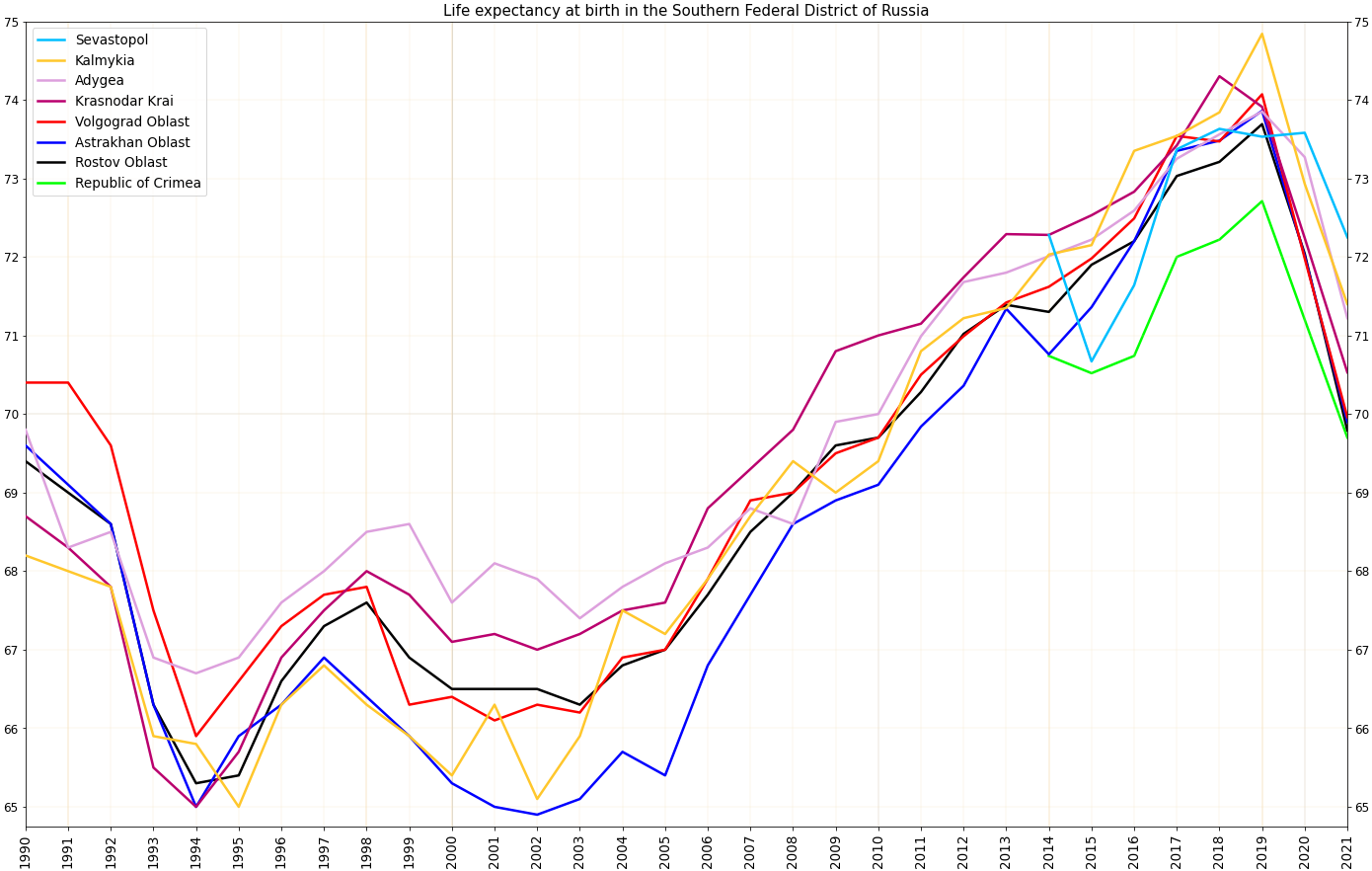
Life expectancy at birth in the Southern Federal District, 1990–2021

== Presidential plenipotentiary envoys ==
No.	Name (envoy)	Photo	Term of office			Appointed by
No.	Name (envoy)	Photo	Start of term	End of term	Length of service	Appointed by
1	Viktor Kazantsev		18 May 2000	9 March 2004	3 years, 296 days (1,391 days)	Vladimir Putin
2	Vladimir Yakovlev		9 March 2004	13 September 2004	188 days	Vladimir Putin
3	Dmitry Kozak		13 September 2004	24 September 2007	3 years, 11 days (1,106 days)	Vladimir Putin
4	Grigory Rapota		24 September 2007	14 May 2008	233 days	Vladimir Putin
5	Vladimir Ustinov		14 May 2008	present	18 years, 181 days (6,755 days)	Dmitry Medvedev
