= North Caucasian Federal District =

Coordinates: 43.7114°N 44.8061°E

North Caucasian Federal District Северо-Кавказский федеральный округ
- Federal district of Russia
- The geographical location of the North Caucasian Federal District
- Interactive map of North Caucasian Federal District
- Country: Russia
- Established: 19 January 2010
- Administrative centre: Pyatigorsk
- Largest city: Makhachkala

Government
  - Presidential Envoy: Yury Chaika

Area
  - Total: 170,400 km^{2} (65,800 sq mi)
  - Rank: 8th

Population (2021 Census)
  - Total: 10,171,000
  - Rank: 7th
  - Density: 59.69/km^{2} (154.6/sq mi)
  - Urban: 50.7%
  - Rural: 49.3%

GDP (nominal, 2024)
  - Total: ₽4.21 trillion (US$57.12 billion)
  - Per capita: ₽409,174 (US$5,555.66)
- Federal subjects: 7 contained
- Economic regions: 1 contained
- HDI (2022): 0.752 high · 8th
- Website: skfo.gov.ru

The North Caucasian Federal District (Note: Russian: Северо-Кавказский федеральный округ, romanized: Severo-Kavkazskiy federal'nyy okrug, IPA: [ˌsʲevʲɪrə kɐfˈkasːkʲɪj fʲɪdʲɪˈralʲnɨj ˈokrʊk]) is one of the eight federal districts of Russia. It is located in extreme southern Russia, in the geographical area of the North Caucasus. The federal district was split from the Southern Federal District on 19 January 2010. The population of the federal subjects comprising the federal district was 10,171,434 according to the 2021 Census, living in an area of 170,400 square kilometers (65,800 sq mi). The current Envoy is Yury Chaika.

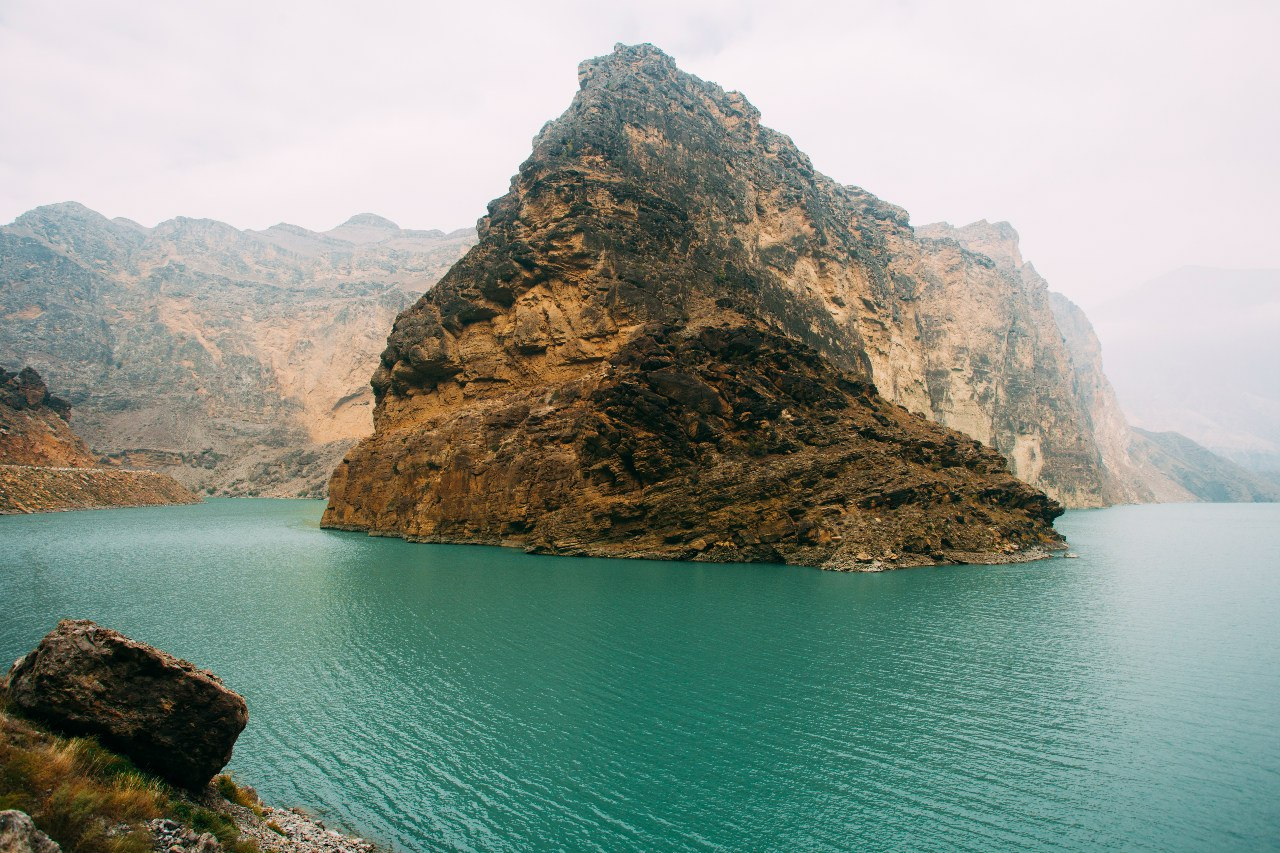
Dagestan landscape

== Federal subjects ==

#	Flag	Coat of Arms	Federal subject	Area in km^{2}	Population 2021 Census	GDP	Capital/administrative center	Map of Administrative Division
1			Republic of Dagestan	50,300	3,182,054	₽814 billion	Makhachkala	
2			Republic of Ingushetia	3,600	509,541	₽77 billion	Magas	
3			Kabardino-Balkarian Republic	12,500	904,200	₽199 billion	Nalchik	
4			Karachay-Cherkess Republic	14,300	469,865	₽109 billion	Cherkessk	
5			Republic of North Ossetia-Alania	8,000	687,357	₽203 billion	Vladikavkaz	
6			Stavropol Krai	66,500	2,907,593	₽1,025 billion	Stavropol	
7			Chechen Republic	17,300	1,510,824	₽268 billion	Grozny	

== Demographics ==
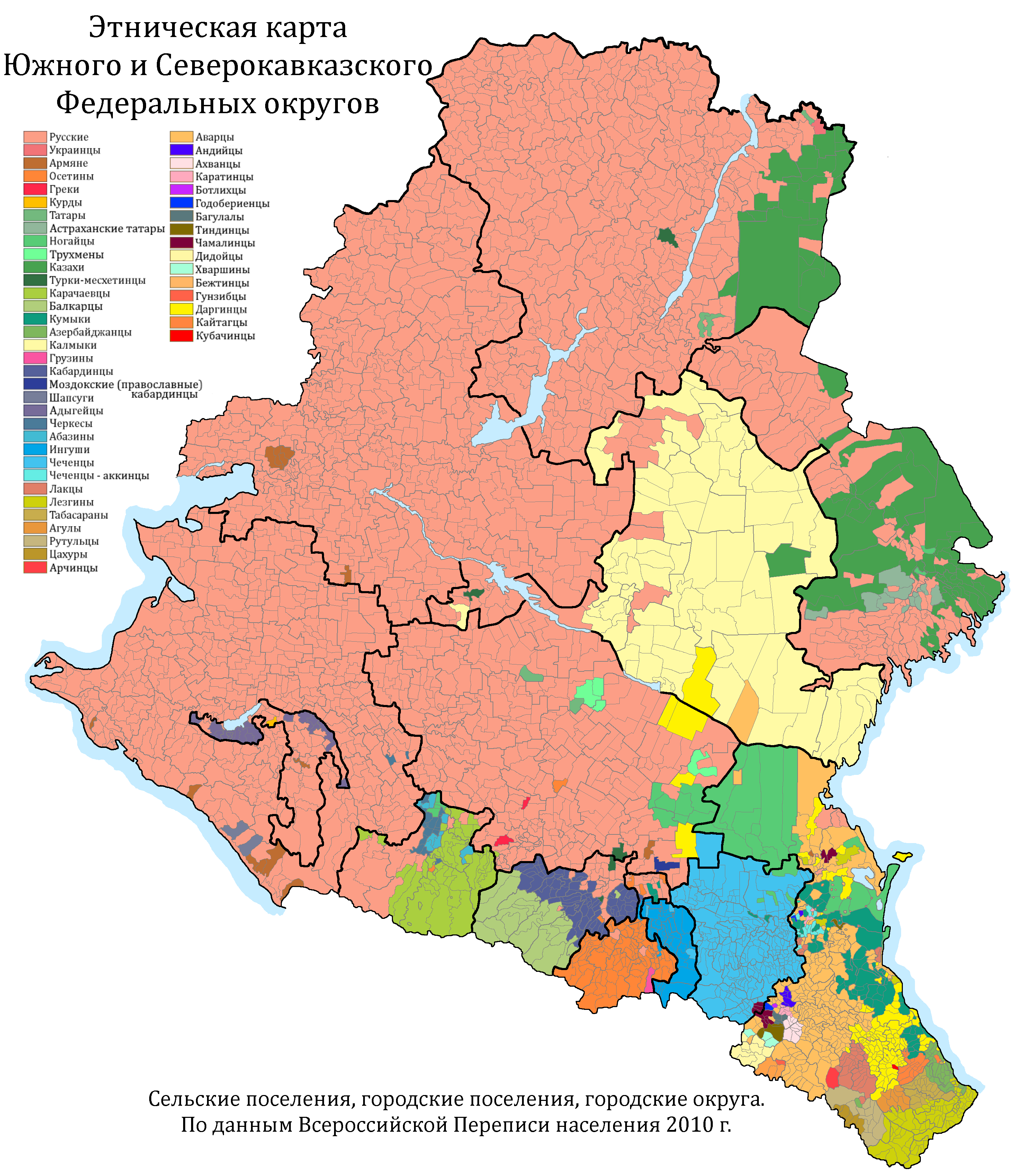
Ethnic map of North Caucasus

Ethnic Russians constitute less than one-third of the total population at 2,857,851 (28.83%), although they do constitute a plurality of the population.

Population pyramid of the North Caucasian Federal District as of the 2021 Russian Census

According to the 2021 Census, Russians constitute a majority of 80% in Stavropol Krai and are at least 15% of the population in North Ossetia, Kabardino-Balkaria, and Karachay-Cherkessia. A diverse assortment of mostly Muslim North Caucasian speaking ethnic and tribal groups form the remainder. The North Caucasus Federal District is Russia's only Muslim-majority federal district, and is the only federal district that does not have an ethnic Russian majority.

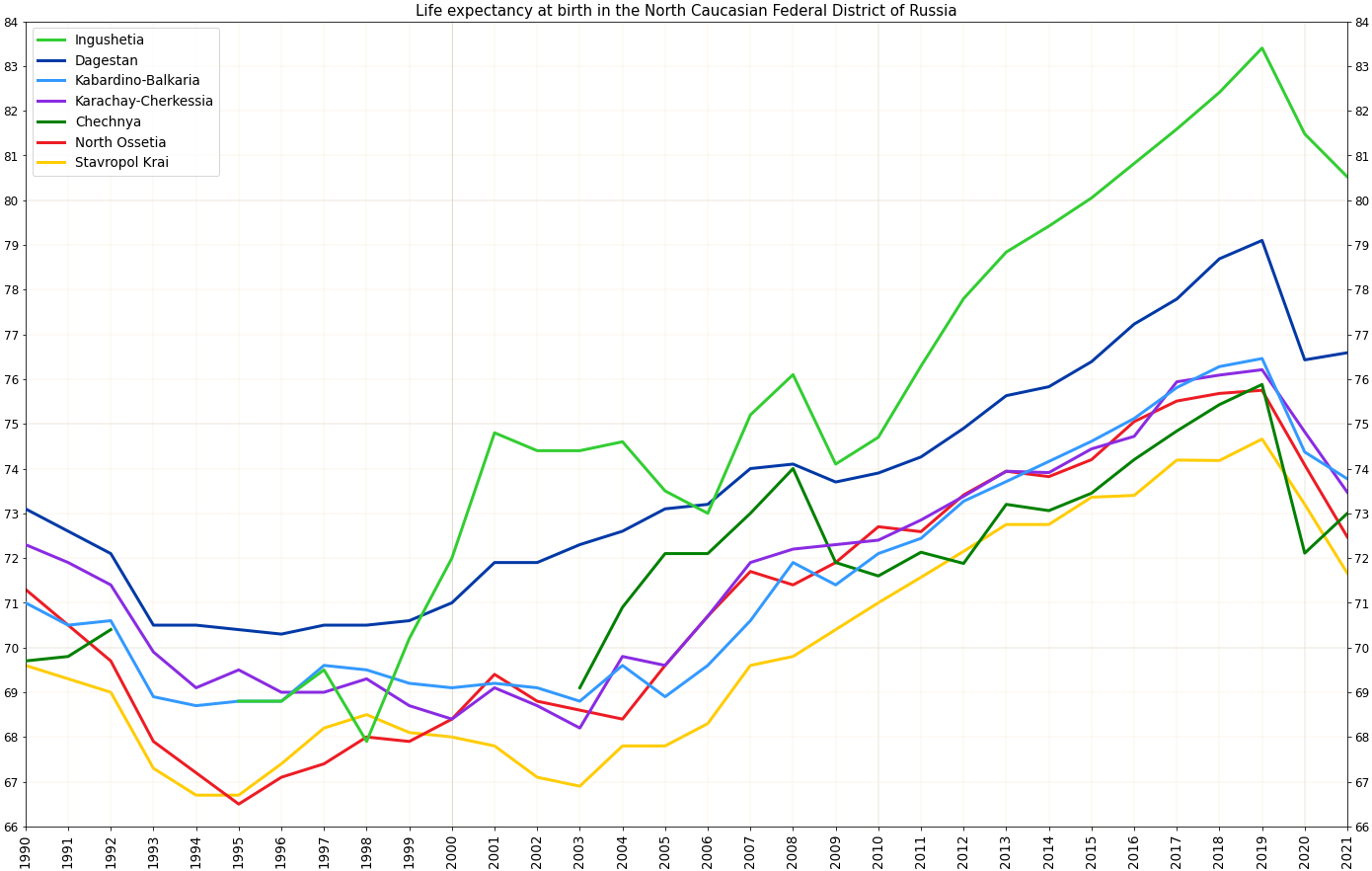
Life expectancy at birth in the North Caucasian Federal District, 1990–2021

According to the results of the 2021 census, the ethnic composition of the North Caucasian Federal District is as follows:

Ethnicity	Population	Percentage
Russians	2,857,851	28.83%
Chechens	1,586,720	16.01%
Avars	972,703	9.81%
Dargins	582,255	5.87%
Kumyks	532,848	5.38%
Kabardians	513,178	5.18%
Ingush	501,544	5.06%
Ossetians	455,765	4.60%
Lezgins	426,869	4.31%
Karachais	222,211	2.24%
Laks	165,737	1.67%
Armenians	156,417	1.58%
Azerbaijanis	136,950	1.38%
Tabasaran	135,694	1.37%
Balkars	122,831	1.24%
Circassians	88,075	0.89%
Nogais	80,040	0.81%
Roma	45,035	0.45%
Abazins	40,478	0.41%
Turks	36,041	0.36%
Aghuls	31,012	0.31%
Rutuls	29,200	0.29%
Greeks	25,700	0.26%
Turkmens	16,276	0.16%
Georgians	15,410	0.16%
Tatars	15,276	0.15%
Ukrainians	13,836	0.14%
Tsakhurs	10,735	0.11%
Others	170,391	1.81%
Ethnicity not stated	258,986	–

Vital statistics for 2022:

- Births: 128,528 (12.8 per 1,000)
- Deaths: 79,661 (7.9 per 1,000)

Total fertility rate (2022):

1.73 children per woman

Life expectancy (2021):

73.79 years

== Presidential plenipotentiary envoys ==
№	Name (envoy)	Photo	Term of office			Appointed by
№	Name (envoy)	Photo	Start of term	End of term	Length of service	Appointed by
1	Alexander Khloponin		19 January 2010	12 May 2014	4 years, 113 days (1,574 days)	Dmitry Medvedev
2	Sergey Melikov		12 May 2014	28 July 2016	2 years, 77 days (808 days)	Vladimir Putin
3	Oleg Belaventsev		28 July 2016	26 June 2018	1 year, 333 days (698 days)	Vladimir Putin
4	Aleksandr Matovnikov		26 June 2018	22 January 2020	1 year, 210 days (575 days)	Vladimir Putin
5	Yury Chaika		22 January 2020	present	6 years, 254 days (2,446 days)	Vladimir Putin
