= Secretary of the Security Council of Russia =

Official in Russia

Secretary of the Security Council of the Russian Federation
- Секретарь Совета безопасности Российской Федерации
- Emblem of the Security Council of Russia

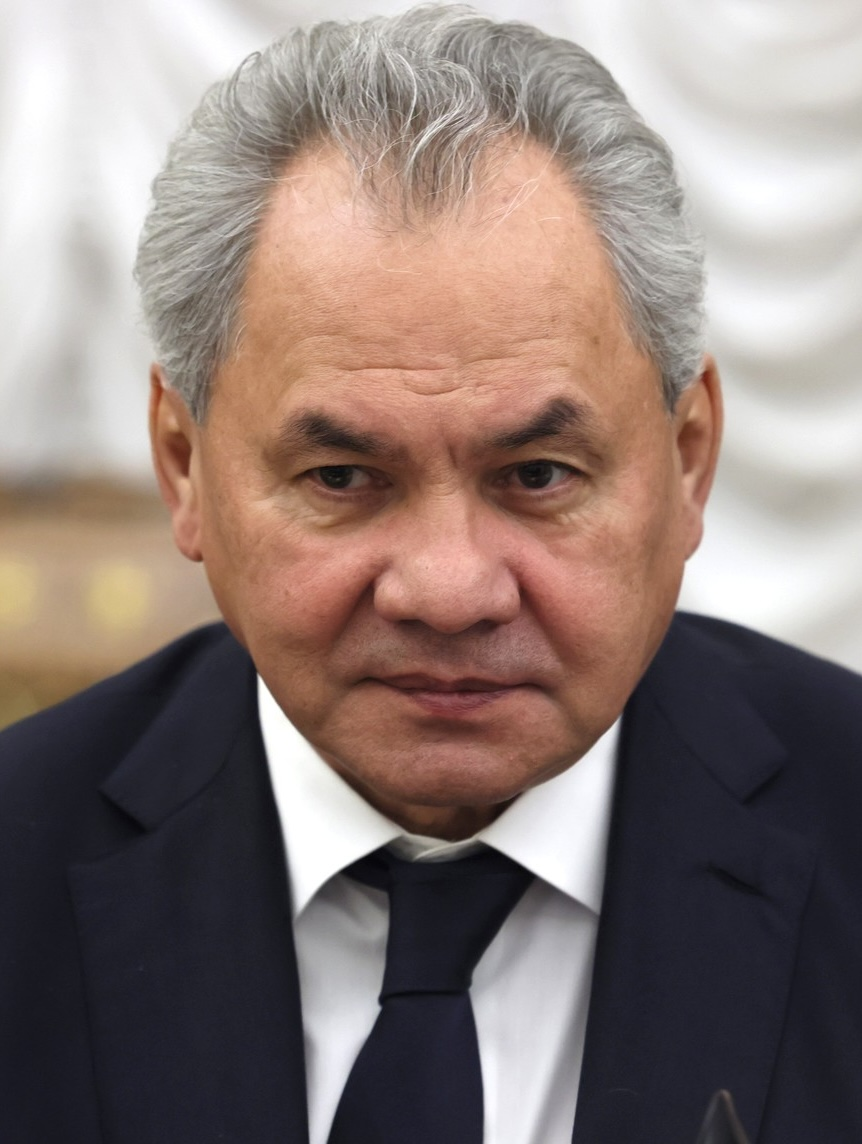
- Incumbent; Sergei Shoigu since May 12, 2024
- Security Council of Russia
- Member of: Security Council
- Reports to: President of Russia
- Appointer: President of Russia
- Formation: April 3, 1992
- First holder: Yury Skokov
- Deputy: First Deputy Secretary, Rashid Nurgaliyev, Deputy Secretary Yury Kokov
- Website: www.scrf.gov.ru

The Secretary of the Security Council of the Russian Federation is the head of the Security Council office and the national security advisor to the Russian President. The Secretary is appointed by and reports directly to the President.

The Secretary organizes the work of the Council, attends Council meetings and coordinates the security policy of the Russian government. This position has been often occupied by those who have served as heads of defense and security agencies. For instance, Vladimir Rushailo served as interior minister of Russia from 1999 to 2001.

Former defense minister Sergei Shoigu has served as Secretary since May 12, 2024.

== Secretaries of the Security Council ==
№	Name	Photo	Term of office			Previous office	First appointed by
№	Name	Photo	Start of term	End of term	Length of service	Previous office	First appointed by
1	Yury Skokov		3 April 1992	10 May 1993	1 year, 37 days (402 days)	Aide to the President of Russia	Boris Yeltsin
2	Yevgeny Shaposhnikov		11 June 1993	18 September 1993	99 days	Commander-in-Chief of the United Armed Forces of the Commonwealth of Independent States	Boris Yeltsin
3	Oleg Lobov		18 September 1993	18 June 1996	2 years, 274 days (1,004 days)	Minister of Economics	Boris Yeltsin
4	Alexander Lebed		18 June 1996	17 October 1996	121 days	Deputy of the State Duma	Boris Yeltsin
5	Ivan Rybkin		19 October 1996	2 March 1998	1 year, 134 days (499 days)	Chairman of the State Duma	Boris Yeltsin
6	Andrei Kokoshin		3 March 1998	10 September 1998	191 days	First Deputy Minister of Defence	Boris Yeltsin
7	Nikolay Bordyuzha		14 September 1998	19 March 1999	186 days	Director of the Federal Border Service	Boris Yeltsin
8	Vladimir Putin		29 March 1999	9 August 1999	133 days	Director of the Federal Security Service	Boris Yeltsin
9	Sergei Ivanov		15 November 1999	28 March 2001	1 year, 133 days (499 days)	Deputy Director of the Federal Security Service	Boris Yeltsin
10	Vladimir Rushailo		28 March 2001	9 March 2004	2 years, 347 days (1,077 days)	Minister of Internal Affairs	Vladimir Putin
11	Igor Ivanov		9 March 2004	17 June 2007	3 years, 100 days (1,195 days)	Minister of Foreign Affairs	Vladimir Putin
-	Valentin Sobolev (acting)		17 June 2007	12 May 2008	330 days	Deputy Secretary of the Security Council	Vladimir Putin
12	Nikolai Patrushev		12 May 2008	12 May 2024	16 years, 0 days (5,844 days)	Director of the Federal Security Service	Dmitry Medvedev
13	Sergei Shoigu		12 May 2024	present	2 years, 180 days	Minister of Defense	Vladimir Putin

== First Deputy Secretaries of the Security Council ==
- Mikhail Mityukov (7 December 1996 – 24 April 1998)
- Vyacheslav Mikhailov (8 June 1998 – 25 May 1999)
- Vladislav Sherstyuk (31 May 1999 – ? March 2004)
- Mikhail Fradkov (31 May 2000 – 28 March 2001)
- Nikolai Solovyov (24 June 2002 – ? March 2004)
- Vladimir Bulavin (30 May 2008 – 11 March 2013)
- Yury Averyanov (29 March 2013 – 1 February 2023)
- Rashid Nurgaliyev (since 6 February 2023)

== Deputy Secretaries of the Security Council ==
- Vladislav Nasinovsky (23 December 1992 – 30 August 1993)
- Yury Nazarkin (11 January 1993 – 30 August 1993)
- Vladimir Rubanov (9 August 1993 – 25 June 1996)
- Aleksandr Troshin (26 October 1993 – 25 June 1996)
- Valery Manilov (27 October 1993 – 18 September 1996)
- Vladimir Denisov (25 June 1996 – 29 October 1996)
- Sergei Kharlamov (25 June 1996 – 29 October 1996)
- Nikolai Mikhailov (31 June 1996 – 11 September 1997)
- Boris Berezovsky (29 October 1996 – 4 November 1997)
- Leonid Mayorov (29 October 1996 – 30 May 1998)
- Yury Deryabin (5 December 1996 – 30 March 1998)
- Boris Agapov (9 June 1997 – 8 June 1998)
- Aleksandr Ageyenkov (17 October 1997 – 8 August 1998)
- Vladimir Potapov (21 August 1998 – ? ? 2004)
- Grigory Rapota (21 August 1998 – 27 November 1998)
- Aleksei Molyakov (30 May 1998 – ? ? 1999)
- Aleksei Moskovsky (8 June 1998 – 28 March 2001)
- Viktor Melnikov (8 August 1998 – 16 September 1998)
- Oleg Chernov (4 January 1999 – ? ? 2004)
- Aleksei Ogaryov (2 February 1999 – 2 August 1999)
- Vladimir Vasilyev (31 May 1999 – 28 March 2001)
- Valentin Sobolev (31 May 2000 – 23 March 2012)
- Vyacheslav Soltaganov (28 March 2001 – ? ? 2004)
- Nikolai Solovyov (19 May 2001 – 24 June 2002)
- Valentin Stepankov (5 August 2003 – 1 June 2004)
- Yevgeny Nazdratenko (30 August 2003 – ? ? 2004)
- Yury Zubakov (28 May 2004 – 3 June 2011)
- Nikolai Spassky (28 May 2004 – 24 June 2006)
- Vladimir Nazarov (9 August 2006 – 17 October 2016)
- Yury Baluyevsky (3 June 2008 – 9 January 2012)
- Nikolai Klimashin (3 June 2011 – 3 December 2013)
- Yury Averyanov (20 January 2012 – 29 March 2013)
- Yevgeny Lukyanov (23 March 2012 – 15 December 2016)
- Sergei Buravlyov (14 December 2013 – ? ? 2017)
- Rashid Nurgaliyev (22 May 2012 – 6 February 2023)
- Mikhail Popov (since 29 March 2013)
- Sergei Vakhrukov (since 31 October 2016)
- Aleksandr Grebenkin (since 23 December 2016)
- Oleg Khramov (since 17 January 2017)
- Yury Kokov (since 26 September 2018)
- Aleksandr Venediktov (since 21 February 2019)
- Aleksei Shevtsov (since 6 February 2023)

== Assistants to the Secretary of the Security Council ==
- Anatoly Krivolapov (2 August 2004 – 10 December 2008)
- Vladislav Sherstyuk (16 September 2004 – 24 December 2010)
- Vladimir Nazarov (25 January 2005 – 9 August 2006)
- Yury Averyanov (17 May 2006 – 20 January 2012)
- Vladimir Zavershinsky (11 June 2008 – 21 October 2013)
- Nikolai Klimashin (29 October 2010 – 3 June 2011)
- Yevgeny Lukyanov (24 December 2010 – 23 March 2012)
- Mikhail Popov (20 January 2012 – 29 March 2013)
- Aleksandr Grebenkin (25 May 2012 – 23 December 2016)
- Ilya Shinkaryov (15 November 2013 – 25 February 2016)
- Sergei Vakhrukov (6 December 2013 – 31 October 2016)
- Aleksandr Venediktov (23 December 2016 – 21 February 2019)
- Aleksandr Abelin (1 December 2016 – 1 January 2022)
- Aleksei Pavlov (19 March 2009 – 7 May 2012, 25 May 2012 – 20 January 2023)
- Nail Mukhitov (since 2 April 2016)
- Yevgeny Anoshin (since 31 January 2023)
- Dmitry Gribkov (since 27 February 2023)
