= Boris Gryzlov =

Russian politician (born 1950)

- Борис Грызлов
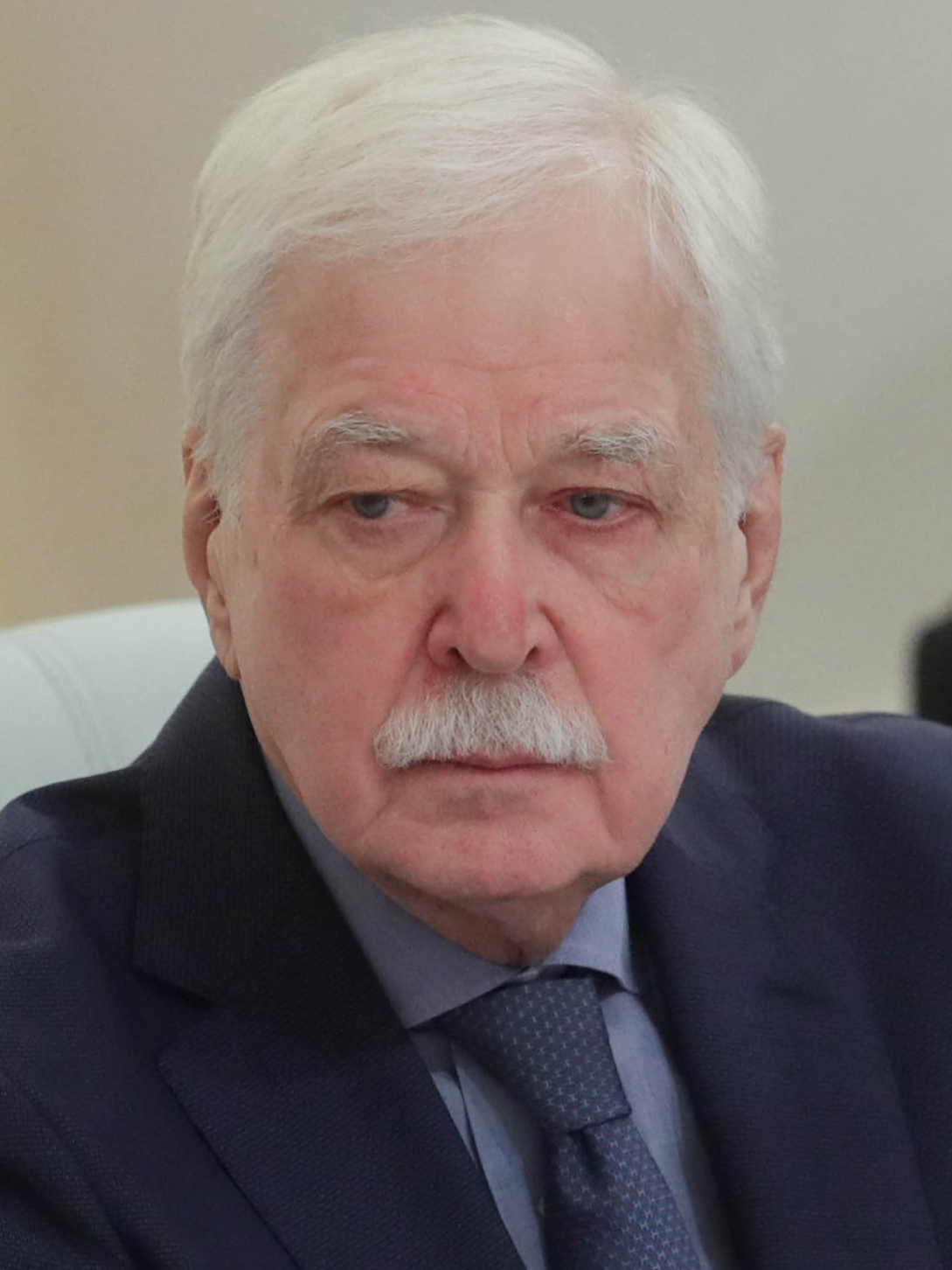
- Gryzlov in 2024

Russian Ambassador to Belarus
- Incumbent
- Assumed office 14 January 2022
- President: Vladimir Putin
- Preceded by: Yevgeny Lukyanov

Chairman of the Supreme Council of United Russia
- Incumbent
- Assumed office 27 November 2004

Chairman of the State Duma
- In office 29 December 2003 – 21 December 2011
- Preceded by: Gennady Seleznyov
- Succeeded by: Sergey Naryshkin

Chairman of United Russia
- In office 27 November 2004 – 7 May 2008
- Preceded by: Sergey Shoygu; Yury Luzhkov; Mintimer Shaimiev
- Succeeded by: Vladimir Putin

Minister of Internal Affairs
- In office 28 March 2001 – 24 December 2003
- Prime Minister: Mikhail Kasyanov
- Preceded by: Vladimir Rushaylo
- Succeeded by: Rashid Nurgaliyev

Parliamentary leader of United Russia in the State Duma
- In office 7 December 2003 – 24 September 2011
- Preceded by: Vladimir Pekhtin
- Succeeded by: Andrey Vorobyov

Personal details
- Born: Boris Vyacheslavovich Gryzlov; 15 December 1950 (age 75) Vladivostok, Russian SFSR, Soviet Union
- Party: United Russia
- Spouse: Ada Viktorovna Gryzlova
- Children: Dmitry (1979); Evgeniya (1980)

Boris Vyacheslavovich Gryzlov (Russian: Борис Вячеславович Грызлов, IPA: [bɐˈrʲiz ɡrɨˈzlof]; (Note: In isolation, Борис is pronounced [bɐˈrʲis].) born 15 December 1950) is a Russian politician and diplomat currently serving as the Russian Ambassador to Belarus. Previously, he served as the chairman of the State Duma from 2003 to 2011 and as interior minister from 2001 to 2003. He was also the leader of the ruling United Russia party.

== Early career ==
Gryzlov was born in Vladivostok but was raised in Leningrad (now Saint Petersburg). He graduated from the Leningrad Electrical Institute of Communications in 1973 and worked as a radio engineer. From 1977 to 1996, he worked his way up from being an engineer to division director in the Elektronpribor plant. He was not a public figure before 1999. In October 1999, he became head of the St Petersburg regional branch of Sergey Shoygu's Unity party, and in December 1999, he was elected to the State Duma running on the Unity party ticket. In January 2000, he was elected chairman of the Unity faction in the Duma.

== Interior Minister ==
In March 2001, he was appointed to the post of chief of Russian police and became Interior Minister. In this position, Gryzlov proclaimed that the fight against terrorism and corruption were his priorities.

Gryzlov supported the Kremlin's policies in Chechnya and won the reputation of being a trusted and loyal supporter of the president.

In August 2001, Boris Gryzlov claimed that up to 100 industrial enterprises in Saint Petersburg, including the Petersburg Fuel Company, a leading gasoline retailing operator in the city, as well as the four main sea ports of Northwestern Russia, Saint Petersburg, Kaliningrad, Arkhangelsk and Murmansk, were controlled by the Tambov Gang. In May 2002, he sent a commission to St. Petersburg to investigate corruption allegations in the city's gasoline market. The investigation was initiated after the Faeton Gasoline Company, the second leading fuel retailing company in the city, had complained to both Gryzlov and the Prosecutor General's Office in April that the Saint Petersburg City Administration had given preferential treatment to the Petersburg Fuel Company.

== Parliament speaker ==
Within a year, he returned to party politics, and in November 2002, became the head of the United Russia, a centrist pro-Putin group what emerged from Unity and several other pro-government movements that joined it. In December 2003, Boris Gryzlov was elected as speaker of the Duma.

In November 2009, Gryzlov defined United Russia's ideology as "Russian conservatism" – characterizing such conservatism as "an ideology of stability and development, constant creative renovation of society without stagnation and revolutions." Gryzlov resigned from the office of Parliament speaker on 14 December 2011, amongst accusations of polling fraud orchestrated by the United Russia party in the 2011 Russian Duma elections.

=== Sanctions ===
He was sanctioned by the UK government in 2014 in relation to the Russo-Ukrainian War.

== Diplomat ==
From December 2015, Gryzlov has been representative of Russia in the Trilateral Contact Group on Ukraine.

On 14 January 2022, president Vladimir Putin appointed Gryzlov as Russian ambassador to the Republic of Belarus. On February 3, Belarusian president Lukashenko received credentials of the new ambassador of Russia.

== Memorable quotes ==
Following the 2007 Parliamentary elections, Gryzlov responded to criticism of electoral violations saying: They in no way put in doubt the final result. The fact that these violations have been registered shows that we have a transparent ballot.

Following the 2009 regional parliamentary elections, Gryzlov stated in response to criticism of electoral violations: Corruption and legal nihilism, inherent to Russian mentality, should not be shifted onto "United Russia" party. Representatives of the nationalist Movement Against Illegal Immigration responded by telling the press that they were offended by such comments. The nationalists attempted to file charges against Gryzlov for belittling the Russian people under the same article used to prosecute nationalists for incitement to inter-ethnic violence, but these allegations were rejected by the prosecutor general.

He has also voiced significant support for the controversial Russian inventor Viktor Petrik, even co-signing together with Petrik a number of patent applications. After the Russian Academy of Sciences commission claimed that Petrik was a fraud, Gryzlov denounced the panel as obscurantism.

== Notes ==
Political offices
Preceded by Gennadiy Seleznyov	Chairman of the State Duma; 2003–2011	Succeeded by Sergey Naryshkin
Preceded by Vladimir Rushailo	Minister of Internal Affairs; 2001–2003	Succeeded by Rashid Nurgaliyev
Party political offices
Preceded by Office created	Chairman of the Supreme Council of United Russia; 2004–present	Incumbent
Preceded by Sergey Shoygu	Chairman of the United Russia; 2005-2007	Succeeded by Vladimir Putin
Preceded by	Parliamentary Leader of United Russia in the State Duma; 2003-2011	Succeeded by Andrey Vorobyov
