= Rashid Nurgaliyev =

Russian army general and politician (born 1956)

- Рашид Нургалиев
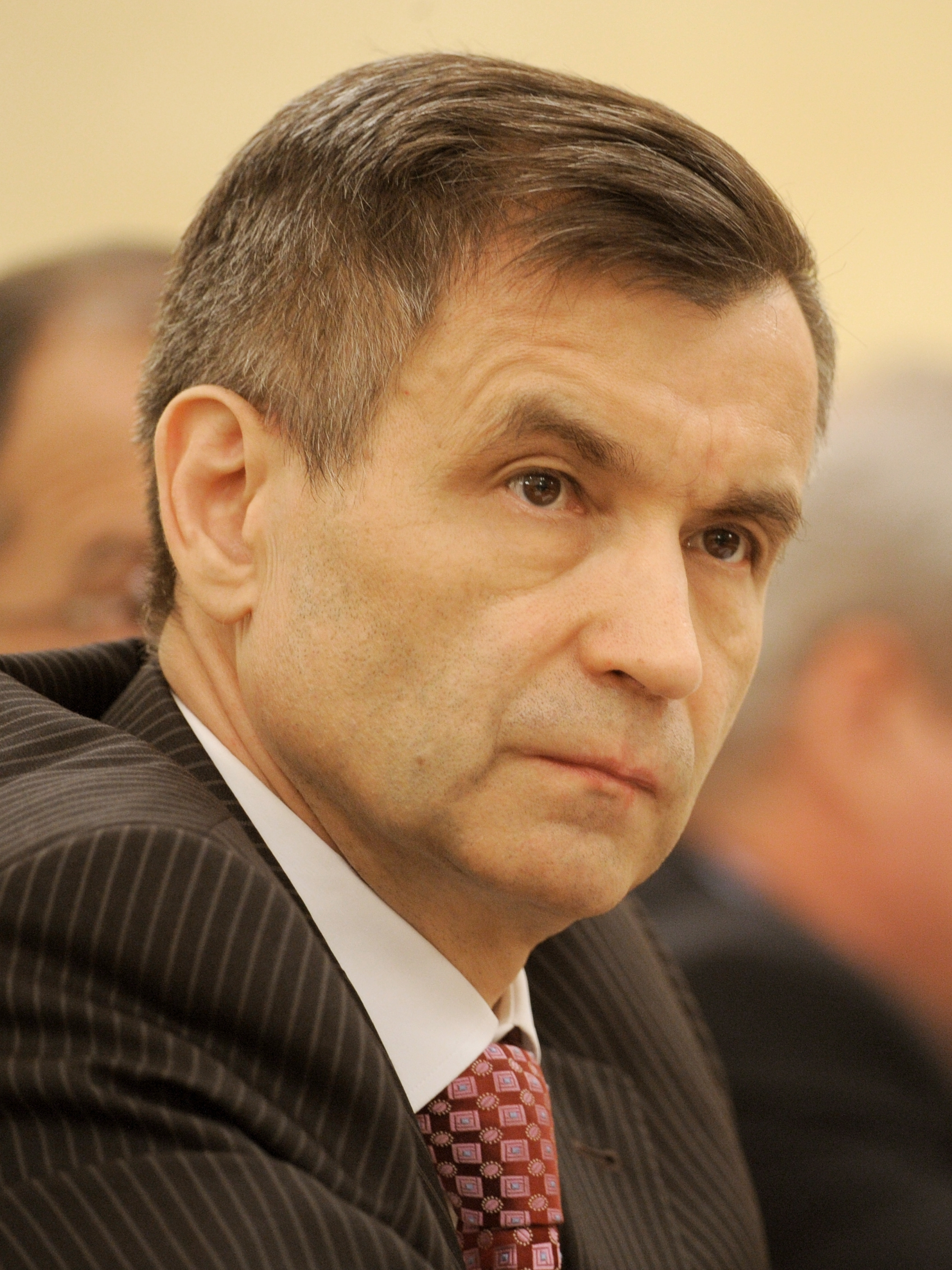
- Nurgaliyev in 2012

First Deputy Secretary of the Security Council
- Incumbent
- Assumed office 6 February 2023
- Chairman: Vladimir Putin
- Secretary: Sergey Shoigu
- Preceded by: Yury Averyanov

Minister of Internal Affairs
- In office 24 December 2003 – 21 May 2012; Acting: 24 December 2003 – 9 March 2004
- Prime Minister: Mikhail Kasyanov; Viktor Khristenko (Acting); Mikhail Fradkov; Viktor Zubkov; Vladimir Putin; Viktor Zubkov (Acting); Dmitry Medvedev
- Preceded by: Boris Gryzlov
- Succeeded by: Vladimir Kolokoltsev

Personal details
- Born: 10 August 1956 (age 70) Zhetikara, Soviet Union (now Kazakhstan)
- Party: United Russia
- Education: Kuusinen State University now Petrozavodsk State University
- Awards: Order of Honour
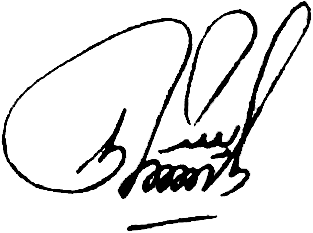
- Signature

Rashid Gumarovich Nurgaliyev (Russian: Рашид Гумарович Нургалиев Tatar: Рәшит Гомәр улы Нургалиев; born 8 October 1956) is a Russian general and politician who currently serves as First Deputy Secretary of the Security Council. He was also Russia's interior minister from 2003 to 2012.

== Early life and education ==
Nurgaliyev was born in Zhetikara, Kazakh SSR, on 8 October 1956. He graduated from Kuusinen State University in Petrozavodsk in 1979. He later received a doctoral degree in economics. His thesis was on the “economic aspects of the formation of business undertakings in modern Russia".

== Career ==
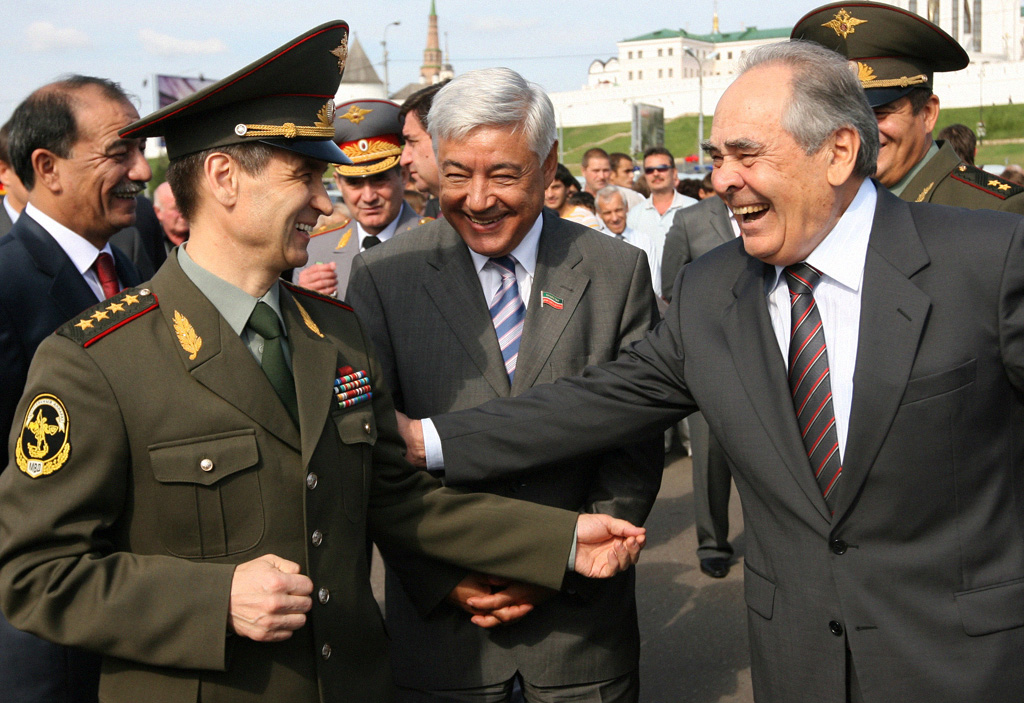
Nurgaliyev (left) with Tatarstan's President Mintimer Shaimiyev, 2009

From 1981 to 1995, he worked in the KGB Directorate of Karelia and its successor, Security Ministry of Karelia, in 1992-1994 led by Nikolai Patrushev.

In 1995, he moved to Moscow and was appointed chief inspector of the Inspectorial Directorate of FSK (FSB) and head of a section of FSB Internal Security Department led by Nikolai Patrushev.

In 2002, he became first deputy minister of interior of Russia. In 2003, he became minister of the MVD. He was removed from office on 21 May 2012 and Vladimir Kolokoltsev replaced him in the post. Two days after his dismissal he was made deputy secretary of the Security Council on 23 May.

He holds the rank of Army General.

In February 2023, by decree of President Putin, Nurgaliyev was appointed First Deputy Secretary of the Russian Security Council.

=== Sanctions ===
He was sanctioned by the UK government in 2014 in relation to the Russo-Ukrainian War.

In response to the 2022 Russian invasion of Ukraine, on 6 April 2022 the Office of Foreign Assets Control of the United States Department of the Treasury added Nurgaliyev to its list of persons sanctioned pursuant to Executive Order 14024.

== Personal life ==
Nurgaliyev is married and has two children. He is an Orthodox Christian.

== Honours and awards ==
- Order of Merit for the Fatherland, 3rd and 4th classes
- Order of Honour
- Order of Saint Righteous Grand Duke Dmitry Donskoy, 1st class (2005, Russian Orthodox Church)
- Order of Akhmad Kadyrov (2006, Chechen Republic)
- Honorary Citizen of the Republic of Karelia
- Yuri Andropov Award
- Medal "In Commemoration of the 1000th Anniversary of Kazan"
- Medal for Distinction in Military Service, 2nd class
- Medal of Merit in the conduct of national census
- Jubilee Medal "100 Years of the Trans-Siberian Railway"
- Medal "In Commemoration of the 300th Anniversary of Saint Petersburg"
- Jubilee Medal "70 Years of the Armed Forces of the USSR"
- Medal for Strengthening Military Cooperation(Defence)
- Medal "200 Years of the Ministry of Defence"
- Medal "For Military Merit" (MIA)
- Medal "For Impeccable Service", 1st class

Political offices
Preceded by Boris Gryzlov	Minister of Internal Affairs; 2003–2012	Succeeded by Vladimir Kolokoltsev
