= Vladimir Rushailo =

Russian politician (born 1953)

His Excellency Vladimir Rushailo
- Владимир Рушайло
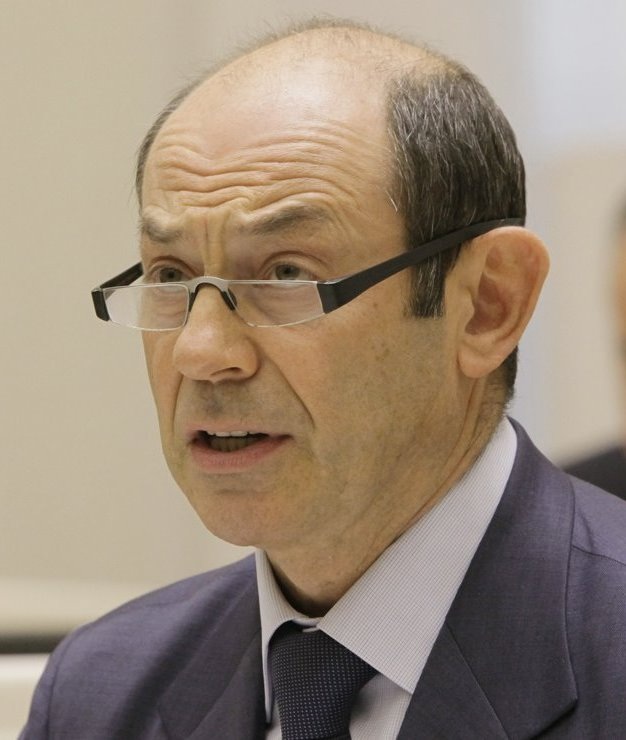
- Rushailo in 2012

CIS Executive Secretary
- In office 14 July 2004 – 5 October 2007
- Preceded by: Yury Yarov
- Succeeded by: Sergey Lebedev

Secretary of the Security Council
- In office 28 March 2001 – 9 March 2004
- President: Vladimir Putin
- Preceded by: Sergei Ivanov
- Succeeded by: Igor Ivanov

Minister of Internal Affairs
- In office 21 May 1999 – 28 March 2001
- President: Boris Yeltsin; Vladimir Putin
- Preceded by: Sergei Stepashin
- Succeeded by: Boris Gryzlov

Personal details
- Born: 28 July 1953 (age 73) Morshansk, Tambov Oblast, Russian SFSR, Soviet Union
- Education: Omsk MVD Academy

Vladimir Borisovich Rushailo (Russian: Владимир Борисович Рушайло; born 28 July 1953) is a Russian politician.

While Rushailo was Moscow City Police General of the Moscow RUOP, he was in open conflict with Georgian mob boss Otari Kvantrishvili.

From 1999 to 2001, he was the interior minister of Russia, and secretary of Security Council from 2001 to 2004. As the minister of the interior, he was charged with overseeing the security of sensitive internal sites and materials such as high-value train shipments and nuclear weapons facilities. His tenure coincided with a period of serious concern over the security of Russia's nuclear weapons stocks, especially with regard to the 2000 computer bug and its potential effects in the run up to and after the Y2K switch. From 14 July 2004 to 5 October 2007, he was the executive secretary of the Commonwealth of Independent States. In 2002, he was injured in a road crash in Kamchatka together with region's governor Mikhail Mashkovtsev.

== Honours and awards ==
- Hero of the Russian Federation (October 27, 1999)
- Order of Merit for the Fatherland, 3rd class (2003)
- Order of Courage (1998)
- Order of Honour (1998)
- Order of the Badge of Honour (1986)
- Order for Personal Courage (1992)
- Jubilee Medal "300 Years of the Russian Navy" (1996)
- Medal "In Commemoration of the 850th Anniversary of Moscow"
- Medal "In Commemoration of the 300th Anniversary of Saint Petersburg" (2003)
- Order of Holy Prince Daniel of Moscow, 3rd class (Russian Orthodox Church)

== See also ==
- List of Heroes of the Russian Federation

Political offices
Preceded by Sergei Stepashin	Interior Minister of Russia; 1999—2001	Succeeded by Boris Gryzlov
Preceded by Sergei Ivanov	Secretary of the Security Council of Russia; 2001-2004	Succeeded by Igor Ivanov
Preceded by Yury Yarov	Executive Secretary of CIS; 14 June 2004 - 5 October 2007	Succeeded by Sergei Lebedev
