= Sergei Ivanov =

Russian politician (1953–2026)

- Сергей Иванов
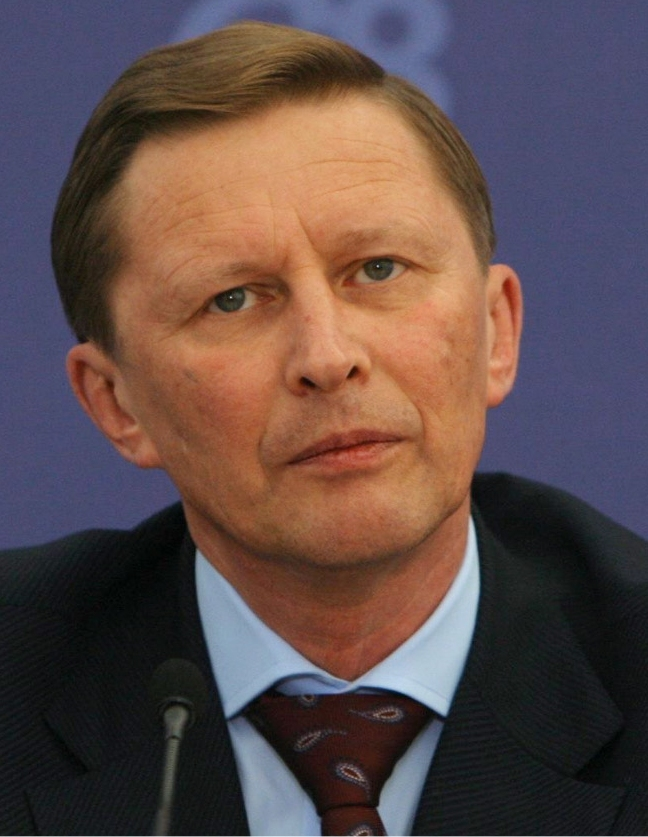
- Ivanov in 2006

Special Presidential Envoy on the Issues of Environmental Activities, Ecology and Transport
- In office 12 August 2016 – 4 February 2026

Chief of Staff of the Presidential Administration
- In office 22 December 2011 – 12 August 2016
- President: Dmitry Medvedev; Vladimir Putin
- Preceded by: Sergey Naryshkin
- Succeeded by: Anton Vaino

Deputy Prime Minister
- In office 12 May 2008 – 22 December 2011
- President: Dmitry Medvedev
- Prime Minister: Vladimir Putin

First Deputy Prime Minister
- In office 15 February 2007 – 7 May 2008 Serving with Dmitry Medvedev
- Prime Minister: Mikhail Fradkov; Viktor Zubkov
- Preceded by: Dmitry Medvedev
- Succeeded by: Viktor Zubkov

5th Minister of Defense
- In office 28 March 2001 – 15 February 2007
- Prime Minister: Mikhail Kasyanov; Mikhail Fradkov
- Preceded by: Igor Sergeyev
- Succeeded by: Anatoly Serdyukov

Secretary of the Security Council
- In office 15 November 1999 – 28 March 2001
- President: Boris Yeltsin; Vladimir Putin
- Preceded by: Vladimir Putin
- Succeeded by: Vladimir Rushailo

Personal details
- Born: 31 January 1953 Leningrad, Russian SFSR, Soviet Union (now Saint Petersburg, Russia)
- Died: 26 June 2026 (aged 73) Moscow, Russia
- Spouse: Natalia Ivanova
- Children: 2
- Education: Leningrad State University; FSB Academy

Military service
- Allegiance: Soviet Union (1975‍–‍1991); Russia (1991–2000)
- Service: KGB (1975-1991); Foreign Intelligence Service (1991-1998); Federal Security Service (1998-2000)
- Service years: 1975–2000
- Rank: Colonel General

Sergei Borisovich Ivanov (Russian: Сергей Борисович Иванов, pronounced [sʲɪrˈɡʲej bɐˈrʲisəvʲɪtɕ ɪvɐˈnof]; 31 January 1953 – 26 June 2026) was a Russian politician, senior official, and former intelligence officer who served as Secretary of the Security Council from November 1999 to March 2001, as Minister of Defense from March 2001 to February 2007, as Deputy Prime Minister from November 2005 to February 2007, and as First Deputy Prime Minister from February 2007 to May 2008.

After the election of Dmitry Medvedev as President of Russia, Ivanov was reappointed a Deputy Prime Minister (in office: 2008–2011) in Vladimir Putin's second cabinet. From December 2011 to August 2016, Ivanov worked as the Chief of Staff of the Presidential Executive Office. Later he served as special presidential envoy on the issues of environmental activities, ecology and transport from August 2016 to February 2026. Having served in the Soviet KGB and in its successor, the Federal Security Service, he held the rank of colonel general. He also held the federal state civilian service rank of 1st class Active State Councillor of the Russian Federation.

Before joining the federal administration in Moscow, Ivanov served from 1991 in Europe and in Africa (Kenya) as a specialist in law and foreign languages. As an employee of the KGB in the Soviet-Union era, Ivanov became a friend of his colleague Vladimir Putin, who appointed him as his Deputy in 1998. He belonged to the siloviki of Putin's inner circle.

== Youth, education and early career ==
Ivanov was born on 31 January 1953 in Leningrad. In 1975 he graduated from the translators' faculty of the Department of Philology at Leningrad State University, where he majored in English and also studied Swedish. In his fourth year, Ivanov undertook an internship at the Polytechnic of West London. Upon graduating, Ivanov worked in the First Directorate of the KGB in Leningrad and Leningrad Oblast in 1976–1977, where he became a friend of Vladimir Putin, then a colleague of his. In 1976 he underwent KGB training in Minsk, and in 1982 he graduated from the Red Banner Institute of the KGB in Moscow.

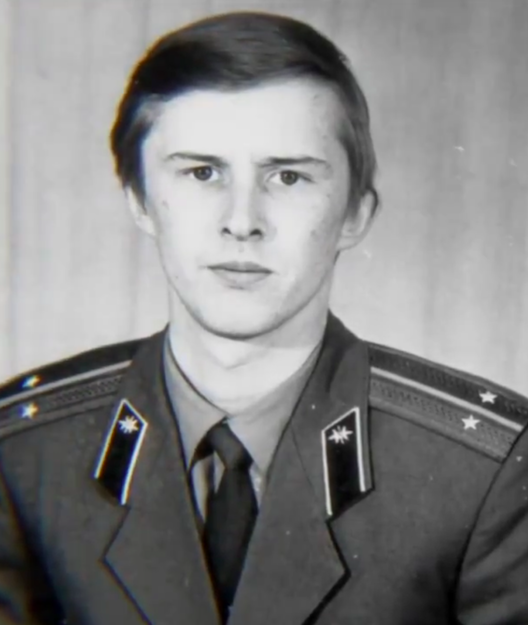
Ivanov in the KGB, c. 1970s

From 1981 Ivanov worked for the First Chief Directorate of the KGB, a position involving prolonged trips abroad. Some sources claim he worked as a secretary at the Soviet Embassy in London from 1981 until he was expelled on espionage charges in 1983; however, the British government is stated to have denied this. From 1985 Ivanov served as second secretary and an intelligence officer at the Soviet Embassy in Helsinki, working directly under the KGB resident Felix Karasev.

After Finland, Ivanov was sent to Nairobi as KGB resident. In 2015 he stated that his career in the KGB had been ruined and destroyed because of Oleg Gordievsky's defection and exfiltration on 19 July 1985 from Moscow through the northwestern part of the Soviet Union near Leningrad, and then through Finland to the United Kingdom. Gordievsky's defection greatly embarrassed both the KGB and the Soviet Union. As a result, the Leningrad directorate, which was responsible for surveillance of British subjects at the time, had numerous persons purged from its service by Viktor Babunov, the head of counterintelligence, including many people close to Vladimir Putin, who also served with the Leningrad KGB at the time.

== Career in Moscow ==
In August 1998, Vladimir Putin became head of the FSB, and appointed Ivanov his deputy. As deputy director of the Federal Security Service, Ivanov solidified his reputation in Moscow as a competent analyst in matters of domestic and external security.

=== Head of the Security Council ===
On 15 November 1999, Boris Yeltsin appointed Ivanov as secretary of the Security Council of Russia, an advisory body charged with formulating presidential directives on national security. In that position, Ivanov replaced Putin as Yeltsin's national security adviser upon Putin's promotion to the premiership.

As secretary, Ivanov was responsible for coordinating the daily work of the council, led by the president. But Ivanov's role as secretary was initially unclear to media observers. At the time of his appointment, the Security Council was a relatively new institution and the council was set up by Yeltsin's tutelage in 1991 and 1992. Between 1992 and Ivanov's appointment in 1999, Yeltsin used the council as political expediency dictated but did not allow it to emerge as a relatively strong and autonomous institution. According to Western analysts, Ivanov's predecessors in that post – including Putin – were either the second most powerful political figure in Russia or just another functionary lacking close access to the center of state power, depending on their relationship with Yeltsin.

=== Minister of Defense ===
Ivanov was named by Vladimir Putin, who had succeeded Yeltsin as president on 31 December 1999, as Russia's Minister of Defense in March 2001. That month, Ivanov stepped down as secretary of the Security Council, but remained a member. Ivanov had resigned from military service around a year earlier, and was a civilian while serving as secretary of the Security Council. Ivanov therefore became Russia's first civilian Defense minister. Putin called the personnel changes in Russia's security structures coinciding with Ivanov's appointment as Defense minister "a step toward demilitarizing public life." Putin also stressed Ivanov's responsibility for overseeing military reform as Defense minister.

Unsurprisingly to specialists on Russia, Ivanov became bogged down in the sheer difficulty of his duties as Defense Minister. But, despite bureaucratic inertia and corruption in the military, Ivanov did preside over some changes in the form of a shift towards a more professional army. Although Ivanov was not successful in abandoning the draft, he did downsize it.

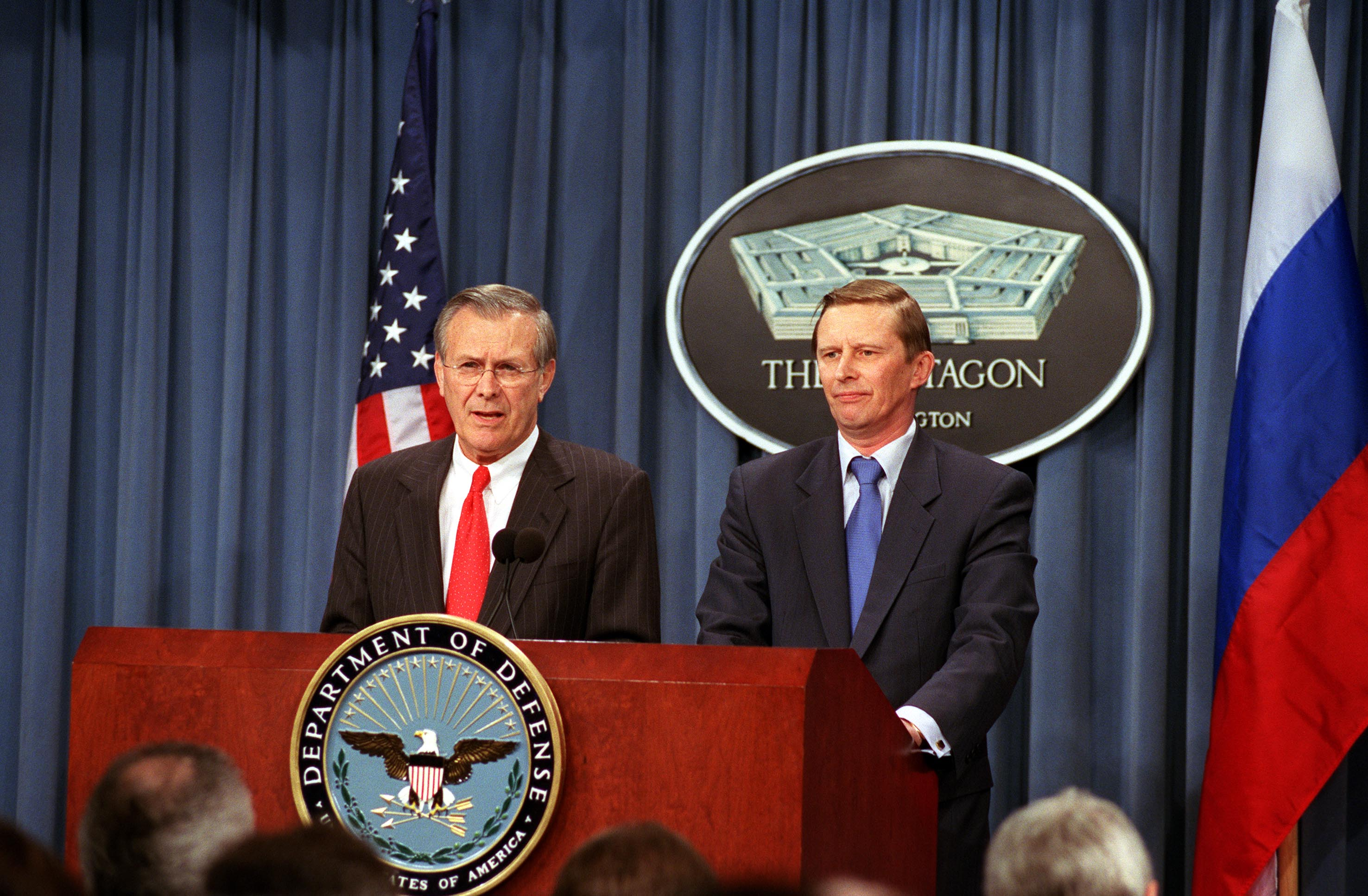
Ivanov with U.S. Defense Secretary Donald Rumsfeld at The Pentagon, March 2002

As Defense Minister, Ivanov worked with U.S. Secretary of Defense Donald Rumsfeld to expand Russian-U.S. cooperation against international terrorist threats to both states.

In May 2001, Ivanov was elected chairman of the Council of Commonwealth of Independent States Defense Ministers.

From time to time, Ivanov disconcerted Western audiences with the bluntness of his remarks on international military and political issues, though his political orientation was moderate and generally liberal on economic issues. In a series of public comments on the 2003–2004 elections, for instance, he unequivocally stated his opposition to rolling back the Western-style economic reforms and privatizations of the 1990s.

In October 2003, Ivanov claimed that Russia did not rule out a pre-emptive military strike anywhere in the world if the national interest demands it, and in March 2004, Ivanov, as Defense Minister, pledged state support to the suspects in Chechen leader Zelimkhan Yandarbiyev's assassination detained in Qatar and declared that their imprisonment was illegal. Later, Qatari prosecutors concluded that the suspects had received the order to eliminate Zelimkhan Yandarbiev from Ivanov personally.

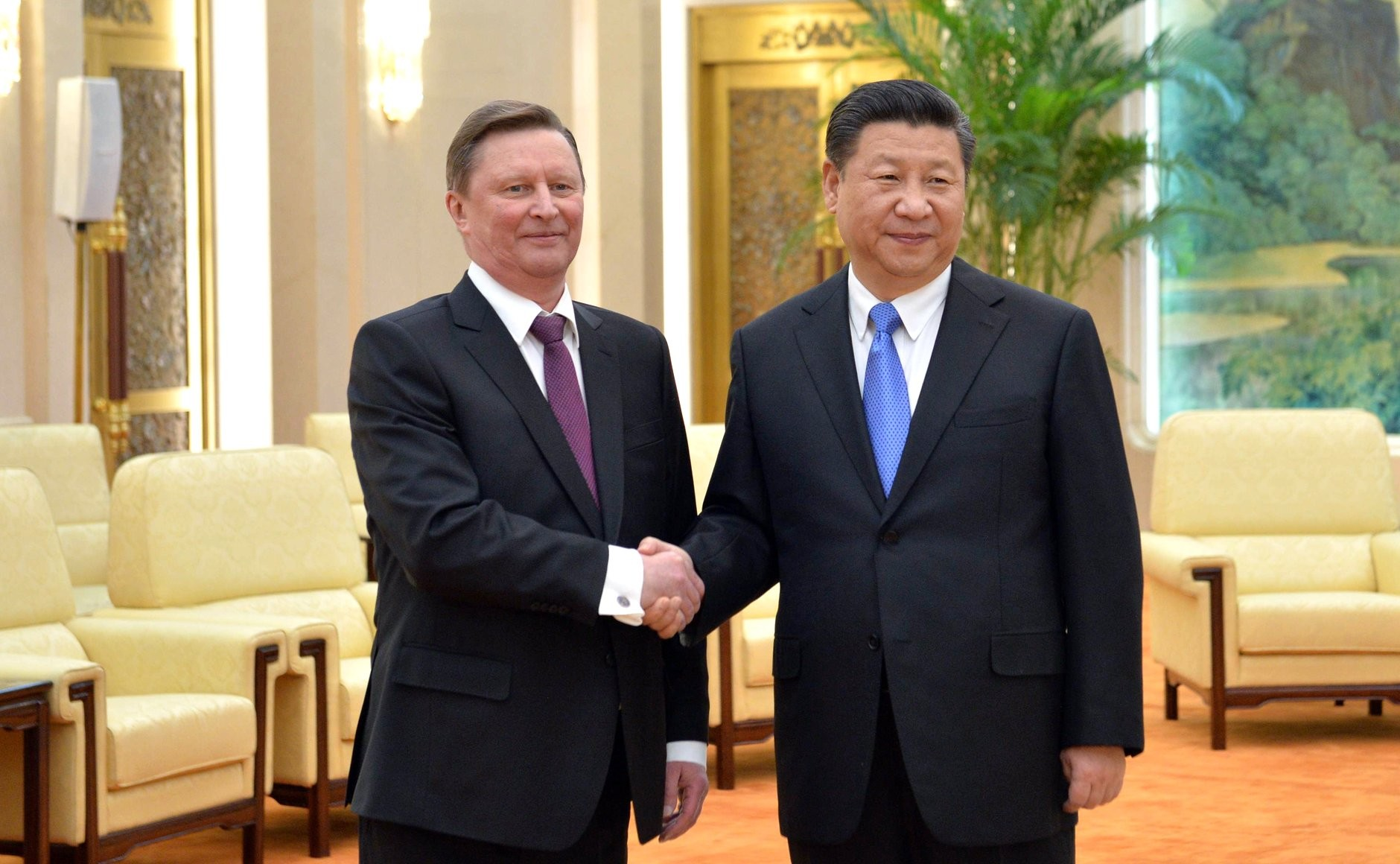
Meeting between Sergei Ivanov and CCP general secretary Xi Jinping, March 2016

In January 2006, Ivanov received criticism for his downplaying response to the public outcry over a particularly brutal hazing incident at a military base in the Urals, which involved Andrey Sychyov as a victim, whose legs and genitals were amputated due to the vicious beatings and abuse.

He responded to the widely covered November 2006 London poisoning of Alexander Litvinenko on 15 December 2006 in Moscow, by telling foreign correspondents that "for us, Litvinenko was nothing. We didn't care what he said and what he wrote on his deathbed." According to Yuri Shvets, Litvinenko was assassinated because he compiled an incriminating dossier about Ivanov.

=== Deputy Prime Minister ===
In November 2005, Ivanov was appointed to the post of Deputy Prime Minister in Mikhail Fradkov's Second Cabinet, with added responsibility for the Manufacturing industry and arms exports. On 15 February 2007, Putin relieved him of his duties as Defense Minister and elevated him to the position as First Deputy Prime Minister with responsibility over defense industry, aerospace industry, nanotechnology and transport In June 2007, Ivanov was appointed chairman of the Government Council for Nanotechnology.

=== 2008 presidential election ===
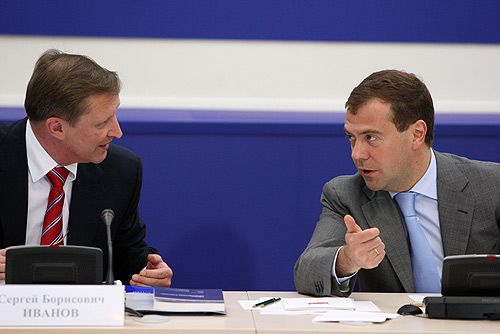
Ivanov with Dmitry Medvedev, July 2008

Because of Putin's popularity with voters, opinion polls and Russian political analysts expected Putin's endorsement to help any preferred candidate in the 2008 Russian presidential election. Speculation intensified in November 2005 with Ivanov's promotion to the rank of Deputy Prime Minister. The speculation further intensified in February 2007 with Ivanov's promotion to the post of First Deputy Prime Minister, but rumours ceased after the United Russia party nominated Ivanov's colleague Dmitry Medvedev to run for the presidency – with Putin's backing. Ivanov expressed his support for Medvedev's candidacy as well.

Russian opinion polls suggested that Ivanov enjoyed wide name-recognition among the Russian public with relatively strong approval ratings.

Ivanov's career, in terms of his background and rise through Russia's state structures, was often compared to Putin's, fueling speculation that Ivanov might run for president in 2008. Three months younger than Putin, Ivanov had been a student contemporary of Putin's in their hometown of Leningrad where both completed competitive specialized secondary-education programs (Putin in chemistry, Ivanov in English language) before attending Leningrad State University. Both completed postgraduate studies in counterintelligence; and both joined the foreign intelligence service shortly afterward. However, according to Ivanov's recollections, he did not become acquainted with Putin during their time as students, but rather when both were assigned to work in the same foreign-intelligence division in Leningrad.

=== Chief of Staff ===
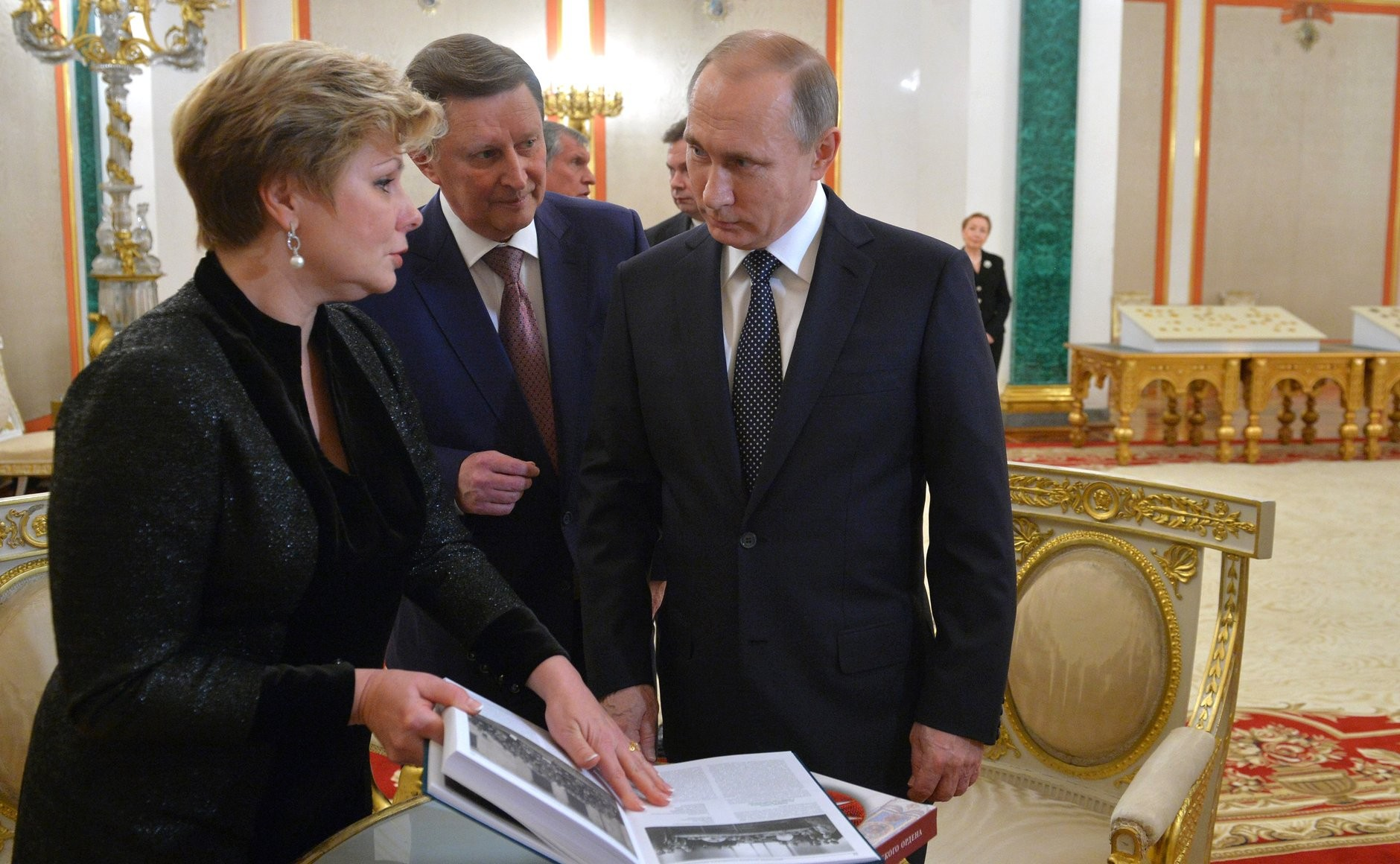
Ivanov as Putin's Chief of Staff, December 2015

In December 2011, Ivanov was appointed Chief of Staff of the Presidential Administration of Russia. He was noted for his hawkish views during the Russo-Ukrainian War and towards the West and his major role in lobbying for the Russian military intervention in the Syrian Civil War.

On 12 August 2016, Ivanov was relieved from his chief of staff position by Putin and replaced by Anton Vaino. Ivanov then became a special envoy for transportation and the environment. Putin's firing of Ivanov was part of a series of replacements of Putin's older peers with young loyalists. The Steele dossier (Report 2016/111) claims that his encouragement of meddling in the 2016 United States presidential election, which provoked unanticipated blowback against the Kremlin, was the catalyst for his firing.

== Personal life ==
His son, Sergei (born 23 October 1980), is a banker who graduated from the Moscow State Institute of International Relations with a degree in economics in 2001 and in finance in 2002; he worked at the State Investment Corporation under Vladimir Kozhemyakin, and then, from 2003 to 2004, was both the chief expert on international projects at Gazprom and an assistant to Andrey Akimov, who is chairman of the board of Gazprombank. He was a board member and vice president of Gazprombank from January 2005 to 2011, and, from April 2011 to March 2016, headed the board of SOGAZ, then headed the wealth management division as a senior vice president of Sberbank from 24 March 2016 until 13 March 2017, when he became the CEO of the Russian state-owned diamond mining company Alrosa.

Ivanov was fluent in English and Swedish as well as speaking Norwegian, and some French. His hobbies included fishing, and reading detective novels in the original English. Ivanov supported CSKA Moscow, he could often be seen at PFC CSKA and PBC CSKA matches.

On 20 May 2005, a Volkswagen driven by Ivanov's eldest son, Alexander (1977–2014), struck and killed a 68-year-old woman, Svetlana Beridze, on a zebra crossing. Charges against him were, however, dropped. Alexander graduated with a degree in global economics from the Moscow State Institute of International Relations, and was deputy chairman of Vnesheconombank. He died on 3 November 2014 after drowning in the United Arab Emirates.

=== Sanctions ===
On 20 March 2014, the U.S. Office of Foreign Assets Control added Ivanov to the Specially Designated Nationals List. On 24 February 2022, following the start of the 2022 Russian invasion of Ukraine, the U.S. imposed new sanctions on Ivanov and his son Sergey.

=== Death ===
Ivanov died from pneumonia on 26 June 2026, at the age of 73. He was buried on 30 June at the Troyekurovskoye Cemetery in Moscow. His funeral was attended by high-ranking politicians such as Vladimir Putin, Dmitry Medvedev, Sergey Lavrov, Sergey Naryshkin, Dmitry Kozak and others.

== Sources ==
- MacIntyre, Ben (18 September 2018). The Spy and the Traitor: The Greatest Espionage Story of the Cold War. Signal. ISBN 978-0771060335.

Political offices
Preceded by Vladimir Putin	Secretary of the Security Council; 1999–2001	Succeeded by Vladimir Rushailo
Preceded by Igor Sergeyev	Minister of Defense; 2001–2007	Succeeded by Anatoliy Serdyukov
Preceded by Dmitry Medvedev	First Deputy Prime Minister of Russia; 2007–2008; Served alongside: Dmitry Medvedev	Succeeded by Igor Shuvalov; Viktor Zubkov
Preceded by Sergey Naryshkin	Chief of Staff of the Presidential Administration; 2011–2016	Succeeded by Anton Vaino
