= Igor Ivanov =

Russian politician (born 1945)

- Игорь Иванов
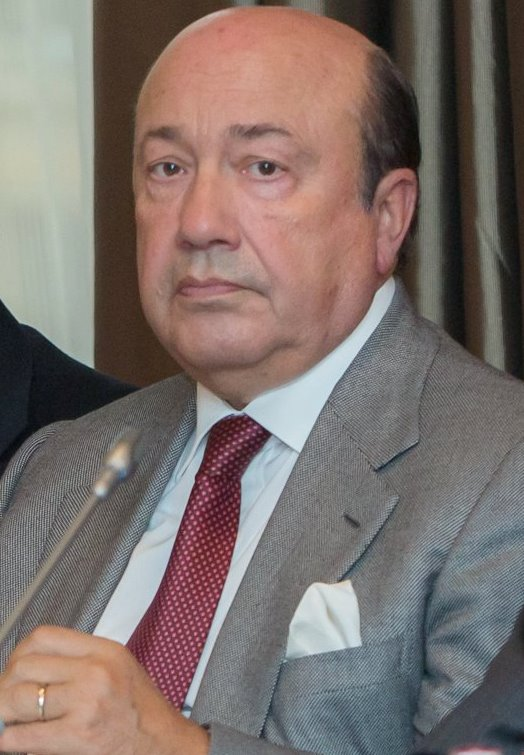
- Ivanov in 2014

Secretary of the Security Council of Russia
- In office 9 March 2004 – 17 June 2007
- President: Vladimir Putin
- Preceded by: Vladimir Rushailo
- Succeeded by: Valentin Sobolev (acting); Nikolai Patrushev

Minister of Foreign Affairs
- In office 30 September 1998 – 24 February 2004
- President: Boris Yeltsin; Vladimir Putin
- Preceded by: Yevgeny Primakov
- Succeeded by: Sergey Lavrov

Personal details
- Born: 23 September 1945 (age 81) Moscow, Russian SFSR, Soviet Union
- Education: Moscow State Linguistic University

Igor Sergeyevich Ivanov (Russian: И́горь Серге́евич Ивано́в; born 23 September 1945) is a Russian politician and diplomat who was Foreign Minister of Russia from 1998 to 2004 under both the Yeltsin and the Putin administrations.

== Early life ==
Ivanov was born in 1945 in Moscow to a Russian father and a Georgian mother (Elena Sagirashvili). In 1969 he graduated at the Maurice Thorez Moscow Institute of Foreign Languages (Moscow State Linguistic University). He joined the Soviet Foreign Ministry in 1973 and spent a decade in Spain. He returned to the Soviet Union in 1983. In 1991 he became the ambassador in Madrid.

== Minister of Foreign Affairs ==
He was appointed Minister of Foreign Affairs on September 11, 1998. As Russian foreign minister, Ivanov was an opponent of NATO's action in Yugoslavia. He was also an opponent of the U.S. invasion of Iraq. Ivanov played a key role in mediating a deal between Georgian President Eduard Shevardnadze and opposition parties during Georgia's "Rose Revolution" in 2003.

== Later career ==
Ivanov was succeeded by Sergey Lavrov as foreign minister in 2004, and appointed by President Vladimir Putin to the post of Secretary of the Russian Security Council. On 9 July 2007, he submitted his resignation, which was accepted by President Putin on 18 July.

Ivanov is the president of the Russian International Affairs Council (RIAC), and is a professor at the Moscow State Institute of International Relations (MGIMO-University), a member of the Supervisory Council of the International Luxembourg Forum on Preventing Nuclear Catastrophe, and a member of the European Council on Tolerance and Reconciliation.

In 2011, Ivanov became a member of the Advisory Council of The Hague Institute for Global Justice, and in 2014 worked for The Moscow Times. In recent years, he appears to be staying out of the limelight and not getting involved in politics and public activities proactively.

== Honours and awards ==
- Hero of the Russian Federation (October 27, 1999)
- Order “For Merit to the Fatherland,” 2nd Class (1999)
- Order “For Merit to the Fatherland,” 3rd Class (2005)
- Order “For Merit to the Fatherland,” 4th Class (1996)
- Commendation of the President of the Russian Federation (1995, 1996, 1997, 1998, 1999, June 12, 2002)
- Grand Cross of the Order of San Carlos (2001, Colombia)
- Order of Friendship (2001, Vietnam)
- Order of Dostyk (Friendship), 1st Class (December 10, 2001, Kazakhstan) — for a significant contribution to strengthening peace, friendship, and cooperation between states and peoples, and in connection with the 10th anniversary of the Republic’s independence
- A. M. Gorchakov Commemorative Medal (2005, Ministry of Foreign Affairs of Russia)
- International Award for Outstanding Contribution to Nuclear Non-Proliferation (2015, Carnegie Foundation)
- “Person of the Year” Award Laureate (1999)
- Order of Saint Vladimir, Equal-to-the-Apostles, 2nd Class (2003, Russian Orthodox Church)
- Certificate of Honor of the Commonwealth of Independent States (June 1, 2001) — for active work in strengthening and developing the Commonwealth of Independent States

== See also ==
- List of Heroes of the Russian Federation

Political offices
Preceded by Yevgeny Primakov	Minister of Foreign Affairs (Russia); 1998–2004	Succeeded by Sergey Lavrov
