= Felix Karasev =

Soviet KGB General and diplomat (1929–2023)

Felix Karasev or Feliks Dmitriyevich Sutyrin (Russian: Феликс Дмитриевич Сутырин; 1 May 1929, Leningrad – 12 January 2023, St. Petersburg) was a KGB colonel and Soviet diplomat. He served three times in Finland between 1963 and 1992. His memoir Naapurinpojan muistelmat was published in Finnish in 1998.

Both Vladimir Putin and Sergei Ivanov worked for Karasev when he was in the Leningrad and Leningrad Region Directorate of the KGB.

Some sources say that Karasev was a KGB general.
