= Viktor Petrik =

Russian businessman (born 1946)

- Виктор Петрик
- Born: 22 June 1946 (age 80); Karpivtsi, Chudniv Raion, Ukrainian SSR, Soviet Union

Viktor Ivanovich Petrik (Russian: Виктор Иванович Петрик; born 1946) is a Russian businessman. He claims to have made many scientific breakthroughs that he markets through his company, Goldformula. Mainstream scientists dismiss his inventions as pseudoscience. Petrik gained notoriety in Russia during the scandal, dubbed Petrikgate, related to the involvement of politicians in promotion of Petrik's pseudo inventions.

== Early life ==
Viktor Petrik was born in 1946 in Zhytomyr, Ukrainian SSR. Petrik attended Leningrad State University and received a degree in psychology in 1976. He later worked in the export business. In the 1980s, he spent time in prison for fraud and extortion. After his release, he started a laboratory and worked on several inventions. In the early 1990s, according to rumors, he became friends with Vladimir Putin, then a city official in Saint Petersburg. In December 2004, he visited former U. S. President George H. W. Bush in Texas and discussed his technology for cleaning groundwater. Petrik lives in Saint Petersburg.

== Inventions ==
Petrik claims to have invented several groundbreaking devices. Some of these include a cell that generates electricity when breathed upon, a filter that turns radioactive waste into potable water, a device that extracts rhenium from scrap material, and a compound which turns light into electricity. He also claims to have discovered a method of producing silicon from fertilizer.

Petrik does not claim to be a scientist. Instead, he maintains that he makes discoveries while in a state of self-hypnosis. He is adamant that all of these discoveries are scientifically sound.

He claims that the filter he invented uses nanotechnology to clean water. He has received a $2.6 million grant from the Russian state-founded nanotechnology company Rusnano to continue his nanotechnology experiments.

However, Eduard Kruglyakov, the head of the Russian Academy of Sciences pseudoscience commission, stated that he examined Petrik's technology with high-powered equipment and found no trace of nanotechnology. Kruglyakov maintains that "[Petrik] hasn't discovered anything." In addition, a Russian nuclear agency has tested Petrik's radioactive waste filter and found it inadequate. Petrik counters that the test was poorly designed.

Upon the presentation of the 2010 Nobel Prize for Physics to Andre Geim and Konstantin Novoselov for their graphene related experiments, Petrik claimed that he was the first person to describe how to produce graphene and deserved a share of the prize. Novoselov disputed Petrik's claim.

In 2010, Petrik sued two Russian newspapers for defamation after they ran articles about him. He won a judgment against them in which they were ordered to run a retraction and pay damages to him. However, the settlement awarded him significantly less than he had sought. The papers have since insisted that their reports were accurate.

=== Patents ===
The United States Patent and Trademark Office has issued two patents to Viktor Petrik. United States Patent 7842271 is for "Mass production of carbon nanostructures", with an issue date of November 30, 2010. United States Patent 7128881 is for "Configurations and methods for water purification", with an issue date of October 31, 2006.

== Politics ==
Petrik has close ties with many Russian politicians, particularly members of United Russia. Boris Gryzlov, the former Speaker of Russia's State Duma (the lower house of parliament), is a staunch defender of Petrik's work. Gryzlov has claimed that criticism of Petrik is modern-day obscurantism. Gryzlov collaborated with Petrik for a filter which they claim is capable of turning radioactive waste into potable water. Petrik states that Gryzlov has participated in many of his experiments and they share a common patent on a "Method of cleaning liquid radioactive waste".

Petrik has named one of his filters after Russian politician Sergei Shoigu and used the logo of United Russia political party on other filters. Shoigu and United Russia have requested Petrik cease using their names in his marketing.
