= Security Council of the Soviet Union =

Security Council of the Union of Soviet Socialist Republics (1990–1991)

Security Council of the USSR
- Совет Безопасности СССР
- State Emblem of the USSR

Agency overview
- Formed: 15 March 1990
- Preceding agency: Defense Council (Soviet Union)
- Dissolved: 26 December 1991
- Superseding agency: Security Council of the Russian Federation
- Jurisdiction: Union of Soviet Socialist Republics
- Headquarters: Moscow, RSFSR, Soviet Union

The Security Council of the Union of Soviet Socialist Republics (USSR) (Russian: Совет Безопасности СССР, romanized: Sovet Bezopasnosti SSSR) was formed on March 15, 1990. The head of this organ was the President of the Soviet Union; he had the power to appoint and dismiss all members of the council. Article 127.3 of the USSR Constitution stipulated that the president of the USSR led the Security Council, which would develop recommendations to implement the all-union policy on national defense, nationality issues, state security, the pace and scope of economic reforms, economic and environmental security and hazards, coping with natural disasters and other emergencies, to ensure stability and legal order in Soviet society. Its members were confirmed by the Supreme Soviet of the Soviet Union.

Its first members included Prime Minister Valentin Pavlov, Vice President Gennady Yanayev, Foreign Minister Alexander Bessmertnykh (politician), Defence Minister and Marshal of the Soviet Union Dmitry Yazov, KGB Chairman Vladimir Kryuchkov, Interior Minister Boris Pugo, along with two "special" members with full time council responsibilities: Vadim Bakatin (who focused on political affairs), and Yevgeny Primakov (who had responsibility for economic affairs). (Note: In April 1991, Ivan Korolyov (Russian: Иван Сергеевич Королёв; born 12 October 1942, Yeniseysk), who graduated from the Moscow State Institute of International Relations (MGIMO) of the Ministry of Foreign Affairs of the USSR in 1965, was an advisor to the Security Council of USSR.)
