= Security Council of Russia =

Constitutional body of the Russian president

Security Council of the Russian Federation
- Совет безопасности Российской Федерации
- Emblem of the Russian Security Council

Agency overview
- Formed: 5 March 1992; 34 years ago
- Preceding agency: Security Council of the Soviet Union
- Jurisdiction: Russia
- Headquarters: Moscow, Russia
- Agency executives: Chairman, President Vladimir Putin; Deputy Chairman, Dmitry Medvedev; Secretary, Sergei Shoigu
- Website: scrf.gov.ru

The Security Council of the Russian Federation (SCRF or Sovbez; Russian: Совбез, Совет безопасности Российской Федерации, СБРФ, romanized: Sovet bezopasnosti Rossiyskoy Federatsii, SBRF) is a constitutional consultative body of the Russian president that supports the president's decision-making on national security affairs and matters of strategic interest. Composed of Russia's top state officials and heads of defence and security agencies and chaired by the president of Russia, the SCRF acts as a forum for coordinating and integrating national security policy.

== History, status, and role ==
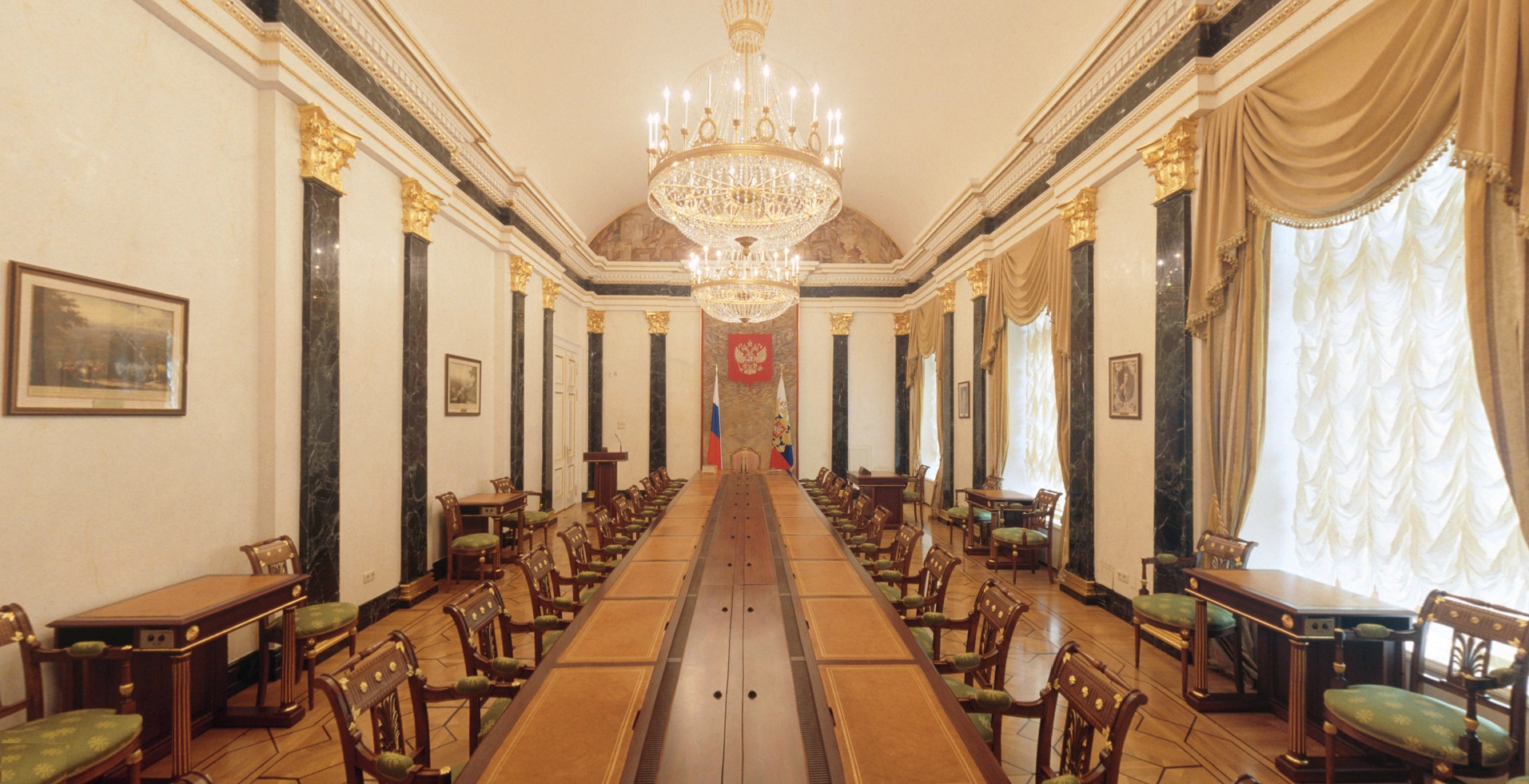
Meeting place of the Security Council in the Moscow Kremlin's Senate building seen in 2012.

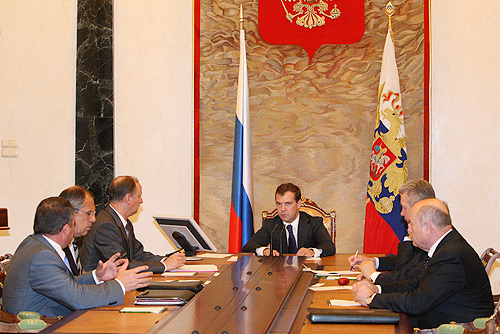
President Medvedev and members at a security council meeting on 8 August 2008.

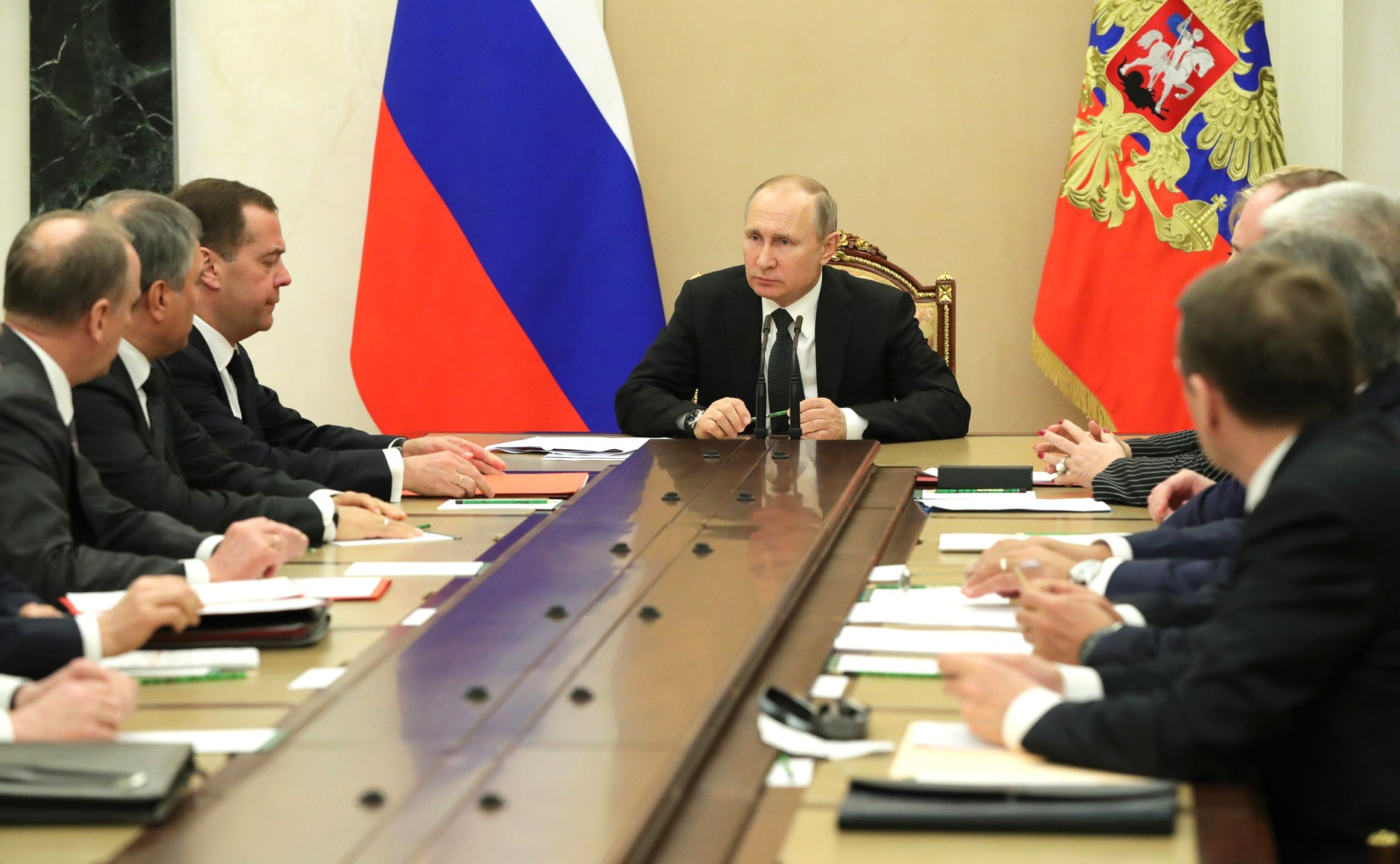
President Putin and members at a security council meeting on 30 March 2018.

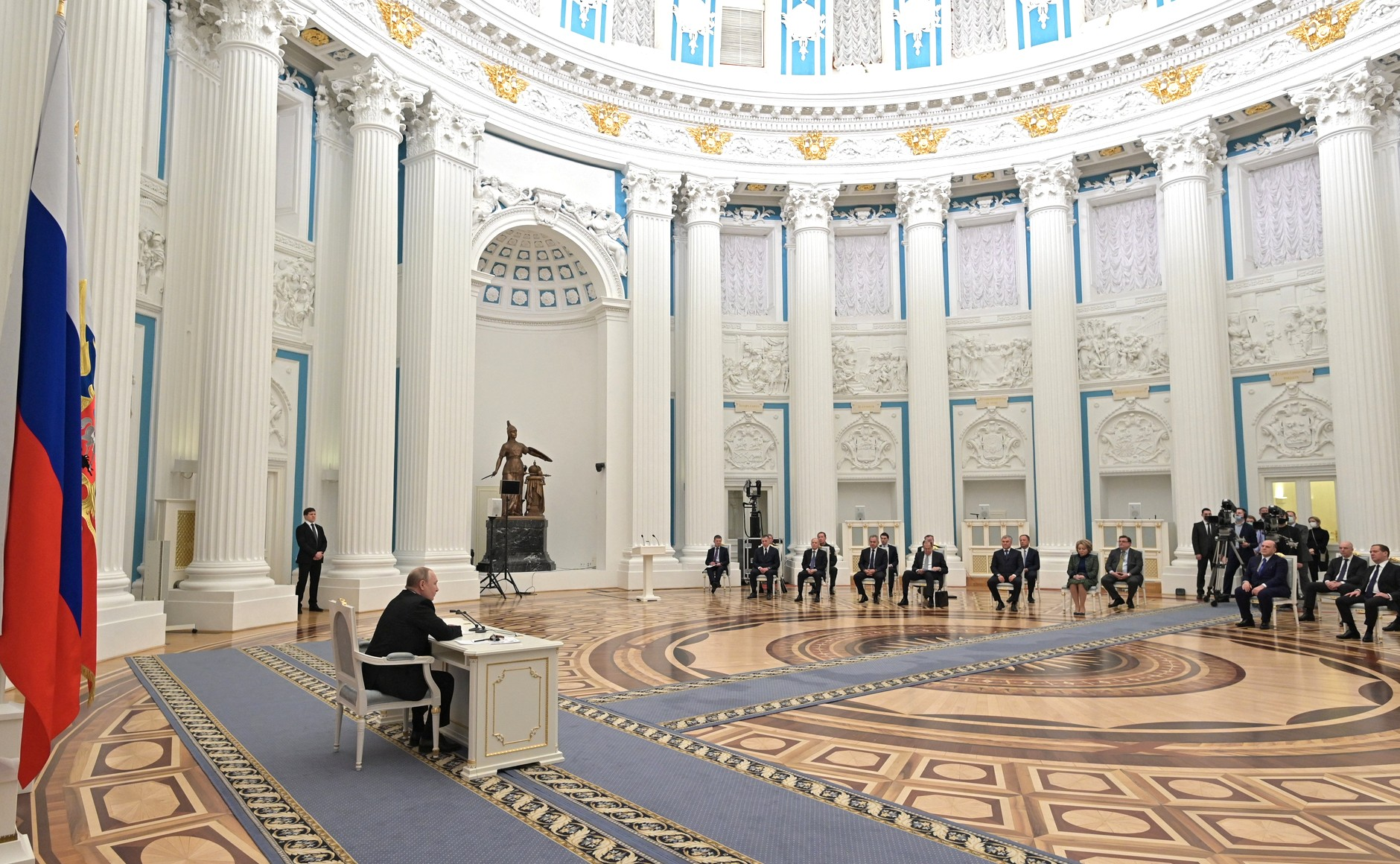
The security council meeting on 21 February 2022.

The Security Council of the RSFSR was legally set up by Congress of People's Deputies of Russia in April 1991 along with the office of the President of the RSFSR (the RSFSR at that time operated as one of the constituent republics of the USSR). The 1993 Constitution of Russia refers to the SCRF in Article 83, which stipulates (as one of the president's prerogatives) that the SCRF is formed and headed by the president of Russia, also saying that the status of the SCRF is to be defined by a federal law.

The 2010 Law on Security defines the legal status of the SCRF as a "constitutional consultative body" concerned with elaboration of decisions by the president in the fields of Russia's defence and national security. The SCRF comprises its chairman (the president of Russia), the Secretary of the SCRF, its full members, and members, as appointed by the president. Under the law, the Secretary of the SCRF is appointed by the president and reports directly to him.

Decisions of the SCRF are adopted by its full members and approved by the president, who may issue decrees or orders for the purpose of implementing them.

The Presidential Decree of 6 May 2011 enacted the Statute of the SCRF as well as a host of other statutes pertaining to the structure and composition of the SCRF.

It has been argued that the coordinating role defined for the Security Council in the National Security Strategy to 2020, published in May 2009, represents a strengthening of the council's influence and importance within Russian governance under its new Secretary Nikolai Patrushev.

On 16 January 2020, president Vladimir Putin signed a decree that amended the relevant laws and established a new state office of Deputy Chairman of the Security Council. On the same day, president Putin appointed Dmitry Medvedev as Deputy Chairman of the Security Council.

== Composition ==
As of 15 March 2026:

Permanent members

| Name | Office |
|---|---|
| Vladimir Putin | Chairman of the Security Council (as president of Russia, ex officio) |
| Dmitry Medvedev | Deputy Chairman of the Security Council |
| Sergei Shoigu | Secretary of the Security Council |
| Mikhail Mishustin | Prime Minister |
| Anton Vaino | Chief of Staff of the Presidential Executive Office |
| Valentina Matviyenko | Chairwoman of the Federation Council of the Federal Assembly |
| Vyacheslav Volodin | Chairman of the State Duma of the Federal Assembly |
| Andrey Belousov | Minister of Defence |
| Sergei Lavrov | Minister of Foreign Affairs |
| Vladimir Kolokoltsev | Minister of Internal Affairs |
| Alexander Bortnikov | Director of the Federal Security Service |
| Sergei Naryshkin | Director of the Foreign Intelligence Service |
| Nikolai Patrushev | Aide to the President of Russia |

Non-permanent members

| Name | Office |
|---|---|
| Rashid Nurgaliyev | First Deputy Secretary of the Security Council |
| Denis Manturov | First Deputy Prime Minister of Russia |
| Aleksandr Kurenkov | Minister for Affairs of Civil Defence, Emergency Situations and the Liquidation of Consequences of Natural Disasters |
| Konstantin Chuichenko | Minister of Justice |
| Anton Siluanov | Minister of Finance |
| Valery Gerasimov | Chief of the General Staff of the Armed Forces and First Deputy Minister for Defence |
| Viktor Zolotov | Director of the Federal Service of the National Guard Troops and Commander-in-Chief of the National Guard Forces Command |
| Aleksandr Gutsan | Prosecutor General |
| Sergei Sobyanin | Mayor of Moscow |
| Alexander Beglov | Governor of Saint Petersburg |
| Aleksey Dyumin | Aide to the President of Russia |
| Gennady Krasnikov | President of the Russian Academy of Science |
| Veronika Skvortsova | Director of the Federal Medical-Biological Agency |
| Aleksandr Linets | Head of Main Directorate of Special Programs |
| Igor Shchyogolev | Presidential Envoy to the Central Federal District |
| Igor Rudenya | Presidential Envoy to the Northwestern Federal District |
| Vladimir Ustinov | Presidential Envoy to the Southern Federal District |
| Artem Zhoga | Presidential Envoy to the Ural Federal District |
| Yury Chaika | Presidential Envoy to the North Caucasian Federal District |
| Igor Komarov | Presidential Envoy to the Volga Federal District |
| Anatoly Seryshev | Presidential Envoy to the Siberian Federal District |
| Yury Trutnev | Presidential Envoy to the Far Eastern Federal District and Deputy Chairman of the Government |

== Deputy Chairman of the Security Council ==
- Dmitry Medvedev (since 16 January 2020)

== Secretaries of the Security Council ==
- Yury Skokov (3 April 1992 – 10 May 1993)
- Yevgeny Shaposhnikov (11 June 1993 – 18 September 1993)
- Oleg Lobov (18 September 1993 – 18 June 1996)
- Aleksandr Lebed (18 June 1996 – 17 October 1996)
- Ivan Rybkin (19 October 1996 – 2 March 1998)
- Andrei Kokoshin (3 March 1998 – 10 September 1998)
- Nikolai Bordyuzha (14 September 1998 – 19 March 1999)
- Vladimir Putin (29 March 1999 – 9 August 1999)
- Sergei Ivanov (15 November 1999 – 28 March 2001)
- Vladimir Rushailo (28 March 2001 – 9 March 2004)
- Igor Ivanov (9 March 2004 – 17 June 2007)
- Valentin Sobolev (acting) (17 June 2007 – 12 May 2008)
- Nikolai Patrushev (12 May 2008 – 12 May 2024)
- Sergei Shoigu (since 12 May 2024)

== First Deputy Secretaries of the Security Council ==
- Mikhail Mityukov (7 December 1996 – 24 April 1998)
- Vyacheslav Mikhailov (8 June 1998 – 25 May 1999)
- Vladislav Sherstyuk (31 May 1999 – ? March 2004)
- Mikhail Fradkov (31 May 2000 – 28 March 2001)
- Nikolai Solovyov (24 June 2002 – ? March 2004)
- Vladimir Bulavin (30 May 2008 – 11 March 2013)
- Yury Averyanov (29 March 2013 – 1 February 2023)
- Rashid Nurgaliyev (since 6 February 2023)

== Deputy Secretaries of the Security Council ==
- Vladislav Nasinovsky (23 December 1992 – 30 August 1993)
- Yury Nazarkin (11 January 1993 – 30 August 1993)
- Vladimir Rubanov (9 August 1993 – 25 June 1996)
- Aleksandr Troshin (26 October 1993 – 25 June 1996)
- Valery Manilov (27 October 1993 – 18 September 1996)
- Vladimir Denisov (25 June 1996 – 29 October 1996)
- Sergei Kharlamov (25 June 1996 – 29 October 1996)
- Nikolai Mikhailov (31 June 1996 – 11 September 1997)
- Boris Berezovsky (29 October 1996 – 4 November 1997)
- Leonid Mayorov (29 October 1996 – 30 May 1998)
- Yury Deryabin (5 December 1996 – 30 March 1998)
- Boris Agapov (9 June 1997 – 8 June 1998)
- Aleksandr Ageyenkov (17 October 1997 – 8 August 1998)
- Vladimir Potapov (21 August 1998 – ? ? 2004)
- Grigory Rapota (21 August 1998 – 27 November 1998)
- Aleksei Molyakov (30 May 1998 – ? ? 1999)
- Aleksei Moskovsky (8 June 1998 – 28 March 2001)
- Viktor Melnikov (8 August 1998 – 16 September 1998)
- Oleg Chernov (4 January 1999 – ? ? 2004)
- Aleksei Ogaryov (2 February 1999 – 2 August 1999)
- Vladimir Vasilyev (31 May 1999 – 28 March 2001)
- Valentin Sobolev (31 May 2000 – 23 March 2012)
- Vyacheslav Soltaganov (28 March 2001 – ? ? 2004)
- Nikolai Solovyov (19 May 2001 – 24 June 2002)
- Valentin Stepankov (5 August 2003 – 1 June 2004)
- Yevgeny Nazdratenko (30 August 2003 – ? ? 2004)
- Yury Zubakov (28 May 2004 – 3 June 2011)
- Nikolai Spassky (28 May 2004 – 24 June 2006)
- Vladimir Nazarov (9 August 2006 – 17 October 2016)
- Yury Baluyevsky (3 June 2008 – 9 January 2012)
- Nikolai Klimashin (3 June 2011 – 3 December 2013)
- Yury Averyanov (20 January 2012 – 29 March 2013)
- Yevgeny Lukyanov (23 March 2012 – 15 December 2016)
- Sergei Buravlyov (14 December 2013 – ? ? 2017)
- Rashid Nurgaliyev (22 May 2012 – 6 February 2023)
- Mikhail Popov (since 29 March 2013)
- Sergei Vakhrukov (since 31 October 2016)
- Aleksandr Grebenkin (since 23 December 2016)
- Oleg Khramov (since 17 January 2017)
- Yury Kokov (since 26 September 2018)
- Aleksandr Venediktov (since 21 February 2019)
- Aleksei Shevtsov (since 6 February 2023)
- Oleg Salyukov (since 15 May 2025)
- Andrey Bulyga (since 8 November 2025)

== Assistants to the Secretary of the Security Council ==
- Anatoly Krivolapov (2 August 2004 – 10 December 2008)
- Vladislav Sherstyuk (16 September 2004 – 24 December 2010)
- Vladimir Nazarov (25 January 2005 – 9 August 2006)
- Yury Averyanov (17 May 2006 – 20 January 2012)
- Vladimir Zavershinsky (11 June 2008 – 21 October 2013)
- Nikolai Klimashin (29 October 2010 – 3 June 2011)
- Yevgeny Lukyanov (24 December 2010 – 23 March 2012)
- Mikhail Popov (20 January 2012 – 29 March 2013)
- Aleksandr Grebenkin (25 May 2012 – 23 December 2016)
- Ilya Shinkaryov (15 November 2013 – 25 February 2016)
- Sergei Vakhrukov (6 December 2013 – 31 October 2016)
- Aleksandr Venediktov (23 December 2016 – 21 February 2019)
- Aleksandr Abelin (1 December 2016 – 1 January 2022)
- Aleksei Pavlov (19 March 2009 – 7 May 2012, 25 May 2012 – 20 January 2023)
- Nail Mukhitov (since 2 April 2016)
- Yevgeny Anoshin (since 31 January 2023)
- Dmitry Gribkov (since 27 February 2023)

== Assistants to the Deputy Chairman of the Security Council ==
- Oleg Osipov (since 13 February 2020)
- Sergei Sobolev (since 13 February 2020)
- Mikhail Trinoga (since 13 February 2020)
- Dmitry Tsvetkov (since 7 July 2020)
- Aleksei Zaklyazminsky (since 18 January 2021)
- Mikhail Mikheyev (since 27 June 2022)

== See also ==
- Council of Ministers of Russia
- Government of Russia
- Security Council of the Soviet Union
