= Dmitry Gryzlov =

Russian television presenter

- Дмитрий Борисович Грызлов
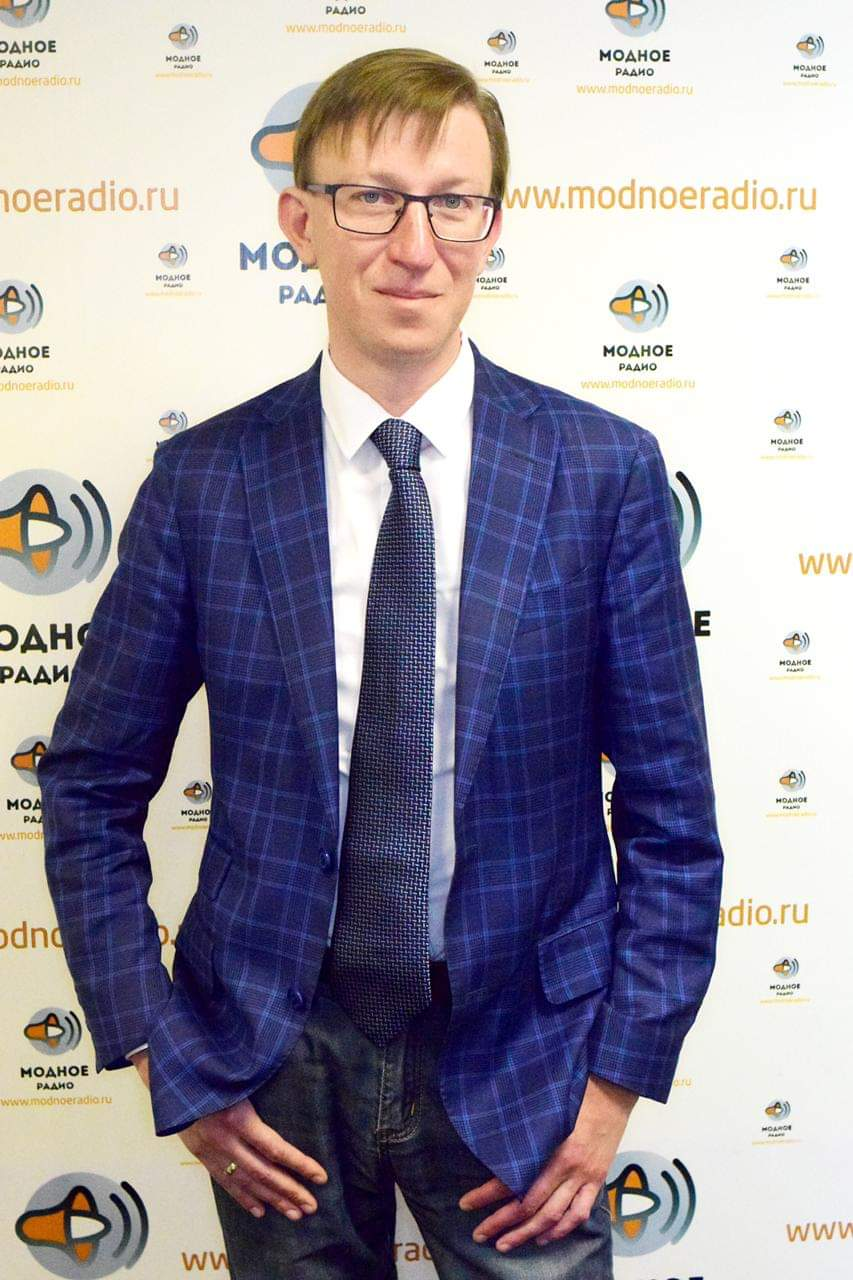
- Born: Dmitry Borisovich Gryzlov; June 20, 1979 (age 46); Leningrad, Russian SFSR, USSR
- Occupations: television presenter, radio presenter, politician, entrepreneur
- Political party: United Russia
- Website: http://dmitrygryzlov.ru/

Dmitry Borisovich Gryzlov (Russian: Дмитрий Борисович Грызлов; 20 June 1979, Leningrad, USSR) is a Russian television presenter, radio presenter, politician and entrepreneur.

Member of the regional political council of the “United Russia” party. Founder of the “Modnoe radio” radio station.

== Biography ==
Dmitry Gryzlov was born in Saint Petersburg in a family of radio engineers, employees of the NGO “Electronpribor”.

=== Education ===
In 1996, he graduated from secondary school 167 in Saint Petersburg.

In 2000, Dmitry Gryzlov graduated from the Northwestern Management Institute. He is a lawyer by speciality.

=== Career ===
Since 1999, Dmitry Gryzlov has been engaged in public work. He was the Chairman of the Executive Committee of the St. Petersburg Branch of Youth Unity.

In 2004, he became Vice-President of the national fund of the youth programs “Dar”, created with his direct participation.

Since 2006, Dmitry has been the Vice-Rector for public relations at the National Open Institute of Russia.

In October 2007, he was invited to work on the TV channel “Your Public Television!”, where he hosted the author's programs “Petersburg detective” and “Territory of freedom” and he was the deputy editor-in-chief of the channel.

In 2008, Dmitry Gryzlov was the host of the first issues of the information and analytical program “Bridge of freedom” on the “100TV” channel.

In March 2009, Dmitry ran for the Council of the Georgievsky municipal district of Saint Petersburg. In the same year, Dmitry Gryzlov was elected to the political Council of the St. Petersburg branch of “United Russia”.

In 2010—2011, he was a television presenter on REN TV.

In November 2014, Dmitry Gryzlov launched the radio station “Modnoe radio”.

== Family ==
- Father, Boris Gryzlov, is a Russian politician. He was Interior Minister from 2001 to 2003 and Speaker of the State Duma from 2003 to 2011. He is one of the leaders of the largest Russian political party, “United Russia”.
- Mother, Ada Gryzlova, is a founder and first Vice-Rector of the “National Open Institute of Russia”.
