= Jubilee Medal "100 Years of the Trans-Siberian Railway" =

State commemorative medal of Russia

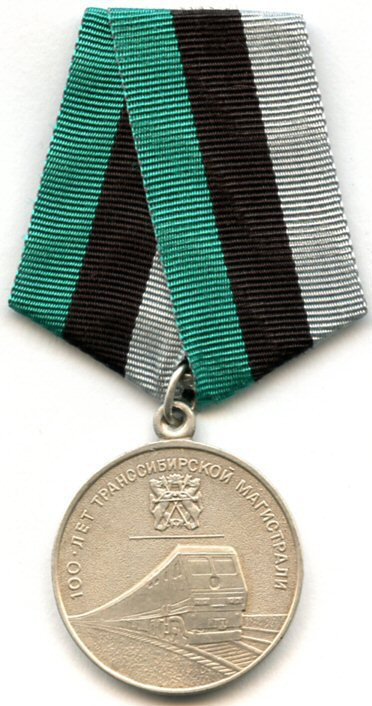
- Jubilee Medal "100 Years of the Trans-Siberian Railway" (obverse)
- Type: State Commemorative Medal
- Awarded for: Work excellence of 20 years or more
- Presented by: Russian Federation
- Eligibility: Employees of the railways and Russian citizens
- Status: No longer awarded
- Established: June 27, 2001
- Ribbon of the Jubilee Medal "100 Years of the Trans-Siberian Railway"

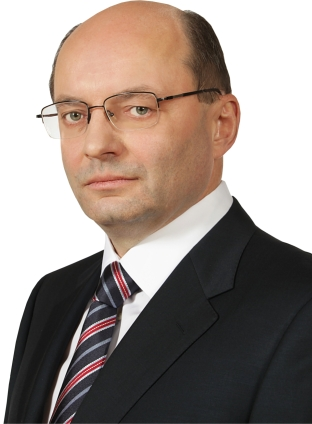
Governor of the Sverdlovsk Oblast Alexander Misharin, a recipient of the Jubilee Medal "100 Years of the Trans-Siberian Railway". (Photo www.amisharin.ru)

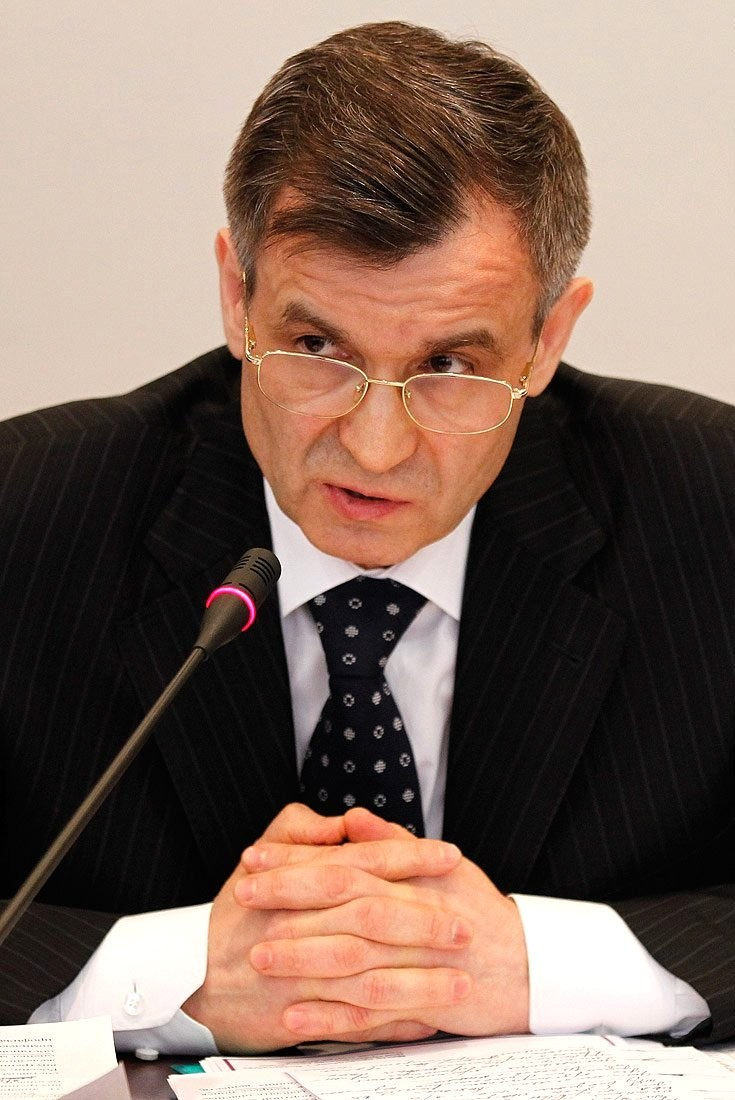
Former Minister of Internal Affairs of Russia Rashid Nurgaliyev, a recipient of the Jubilee Medal "100 Years of the Trans-Siberian Railway". (Photo www.kremlin.ru)

The Jubilee Medal "100 Years of the Trans-Siberian Railway" (Russian: юбилейная медаль «100 лет Транссибирской магистрали») is a state commemorative medal of the Russian Federation created to denote the 100th anniversary of the Trans-Siberian Railway. It was established on June 27, 2001, by Presidential Decree No. 777.

== Medal statute ==
The Jubilee Medal "100 Years of the Trans-Siberian Railway" is awarded to employees of the railways who worked flawlessly in the industry for 20 years or more, as well as to other citizens of the Russian Federation who have made a significant contribution to the development of the Trans-Siberian railway.

Presidential Decree 1099 of September 7, 2010 removed the Medal "100 Years of the Trans-Siberian Railway" from the list of state awards of the Russian Federation. It is no longer awarded.

== Medal description ==
The Jubilee Medal "100 Years of the Trans-Siberian Railway" is a silver 32mm in diameter circular medal with raised rims on both sides. On its obverse the relief image of a locomotive pulling a train towards the right at a shallow angle. Above the train, the ancient emblem of Siberia (two sables supporting a crown, a bow and arrows). Along the medal circumference in the upper half of the obverse, the relief inscription "100 Years of the Trans-Siberian Railway" (Russian: "100 лет Транссибирской магистрали"). The reverse center bears the relief inscription "1901 2001" with the image of a crossed hammer and wrench.

The medal is suspended by a ring through the award's suspension loop to a standard Russian pentagonal mount covered with an overlapping 24mm wide silk moiré ribbon with three equal 8mm wide stripes of green, black and silver.

== Notable recipients ==
The individuals listed below were awarded the current Russian Federation Jubilee Medal "100 Years of the Trans-Siberian Railway":

- Governor of the Sverdlovsk Oblast Alexander Sergeevich Misharin
- Former Minister of the Internal Affairs of Russia Rashid Gumarovich Nurgaliyev
- Writer, doctor of historical sciences Valerii Nikolaevich Ganichev
- Politician, Chairman of the Government of the Sverdlovsk Oblast Anatoly Leonidovich Gredin

== See also ==
- Awards and decorations of the Russian Federation
- Trans-Siberian Railway
- Russian Railways
