= Yury Skokov =

Russian politician

- Юрий Скоков

Secretary of the Security Council of Russia
- In office 22 May 1992 – 10 May 1993
- President: Boris Yeltsin
- Preceded by: Office established
- Succeeded by: Yevgeny Shaposhnikov

Assistant to the President of the RSFSR
- In office 19 September 1991 – 3 April 1992
- President: Boris Yeltsin

Personal details
- Born: Yury Vladimirovich Skokov; 20 June 1938 Vladivostok, RSFSR, Soviet Union
- Died: 5 February 2013 (aged 74) Moscow, Russia
- Citizenship: Russia; Soviet Union (previously)
- Party: A Just Russia
- Other political affiliations: Communist Party of the Soviet Union (until 1991)
- Education: Leningrad Electrotechnical Institute
- Awards: Order of the Red Banner of Labour Order of the Badge of Honour

Yury Vladimirovich Skokov (Russian: Юрий Владимирович Скоков; 20 June 1938 – 5 February 2013) was a Russian politician who served as Secretary of the Security Council of Russia from 1992 to 1993.

== Early life and education ==
Yury Skokov was born in Vladivostok, Russian SFSR, Soviet Union on June 20, 1938. His father was an NKVD officer.

He graduated from the Leningrad Electrotechnical Institute in 1961 with a degree in radio engineering, Candidate of Sciences.

== Career ==
From 1961 to 1969, Skokov was a researcher at Research Institute No. 2 of the Ministry of Defense of the Soviet Union in Kalinin. He then worked at the All-Union Research Institute of Current Sources of the Ministry of Electrotechnical Industry of the Soviet Union from 1969 to 1977. He then became the director of a manufacturing plant in Krasnodar and worked there until 1986. In 1986, he was appointed General Director of NPO Kvant, a company which manufactured autonomous energy. In 1988, he became one of the initiators of the creation of AMBI Bank (Joint-Stock Commercial Bank for Intersectoral Integration).

=== Political career ===
He was elected a member of the Moscow City Committee of the Communist Party of the Soviet Union, and served as a People's Deputy in the Congress of People's Deputies from 1989 to 1991. From 1990 to 1991, he was the First Deputy Chairman of the Council of Ministers of the RSFSR. Skokov then served as the State Advisor to the RSFSR and Secretary of the Council for Federation and Territory Affairs under the President of the RSFSR from July 19, 1991, to September 12, 1991. He also became a member of the State Council under the President of the RSFSR in 1991. From September 19, 1991, to April 3, 1992, he served as the Assistant to the President of the RSFSR, Boris Yeltsin.

From May 22, 1992, to May 10, 1993, he served as the Secretary of the Security Council of Russia. As Secretary of the Security Council, Skokov was responsible for resolving issues with former union republics of the Soviet Union. He actively participated in settling the Abkhaz-Georgian conflict and his efforts helped Russia take a balanced take at the issue.

In March 1993, he entered into an open conflict with the President of Russia, Boris Yeltsin, refusing to endorse the draft decree of Yeltsin on the introduction of a special procedure for governing the country. The decree included the dissolution of the Supreme Soviet of Russia, which was contrary to the 1978 Constitution of the RSFSR which was still in power. Due to the conflict, Skokov was removed from his post on May 10, 1993.

From August to September 1993, he participated in the creation of the "Consent for the Fatherland" committee, a centrist organization which wanted to peacefully resolve the 1993 Russian constitutional crisis.

In April 1995, Skokov held the All-Russian Congress of the Congress of Russian Communities, at which he was elected Chairman of the organization's national council. The Congress of Russian Communities participated in the 1995 Russian legislative election, but did not overcome the 5% threshold, receiving only 4.31% of the vote.

In 1997, Skokov became a member of the Presidential Council of the Republic of Sakha.

In October 2006, Skokov was elected to the Presidium of the Central Council of A Just Russia during the constituent congress. Later in April 2007, he became one of the leaders of the Moscow branch of the party.

== Death ==
Yury Skokov died on February 5, 2013, at his residence in Moscow from a heart attack. Nikolai Patrushev, then Secretary of the Security Council of Russia visited the requiem. Skokov was buried at the Troyekurovskoye Cemetery located in Moscow.

== Awards ==
- (Soviet Union) Order of the Red Banner of Labour
- (Soviet Union) Order of the Badge of Honour
- Medal "Defender of a Free Russia"

== See also ==
- Security Council of Russia
- Congress of People's Deputies of the Soviet Union
