= Vladimir Rubanov =

Soviet and Russian statesman

- Владимир Рубанов
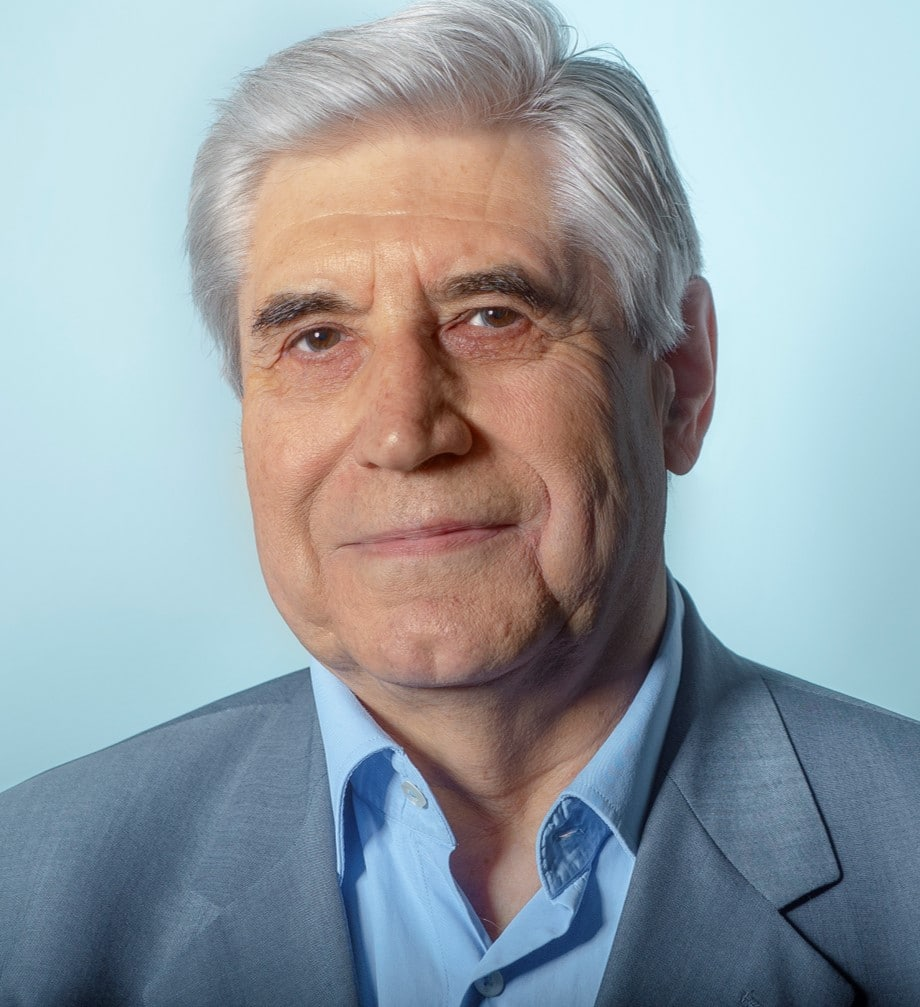

Deputy Secretary of The Security Council of the Russian Federation
- In office August 9, 1993 – June 25, 1996

Deputy Chairman of the RSFSR State Committee for Public Security and Cooperation with The USSR Ministry of Defense and The USSR State Security Committee
- In office October 10, 1990 – January 31, 1991
- Preceded by: the position was established
- Succeeded by: the position has been abolished

Assistant Minister of Internal Affairs of the USSR
- In office 1989–1990

Personal details
- Born: 2 July 1944 Anninsky District, Voronezh Oblast, Russian SFSR, Soviet Union
- Died: December 7, 2023 Moscow
- Party: Communist Party of the Soviet Union
- Education: Voronezh State Technical University
- Awards: Medal "For Impeccable Service"; Medal "Defender of a Free Russia"

Military service
- Rank: Soviet Colonels (KGB)

Vladimir Rubanov (Russian: Владимир Арсентьевич Рубанов, July 2, 1944 – December 7, 2023) was a Soviet and Russian statesman and public figure, Deputy Secretary of The Security Council of the Russian Federation in 1993-1996. State Counselor of the Russian Federation 1st class. Author of the methodological complex “Semantic Topology Knowledge Base”. Russian specialist in the field of organization and management theory, author of more than 150 publications.

== Family ==
Father – Arseny Rubanov, born in 1902, a native of Voronezh region. In the ranks of The R.K.K.A. since 1926, a participant in the Great Patriotic War. Fought in rifle divisions on the Belorussian front. Rank:

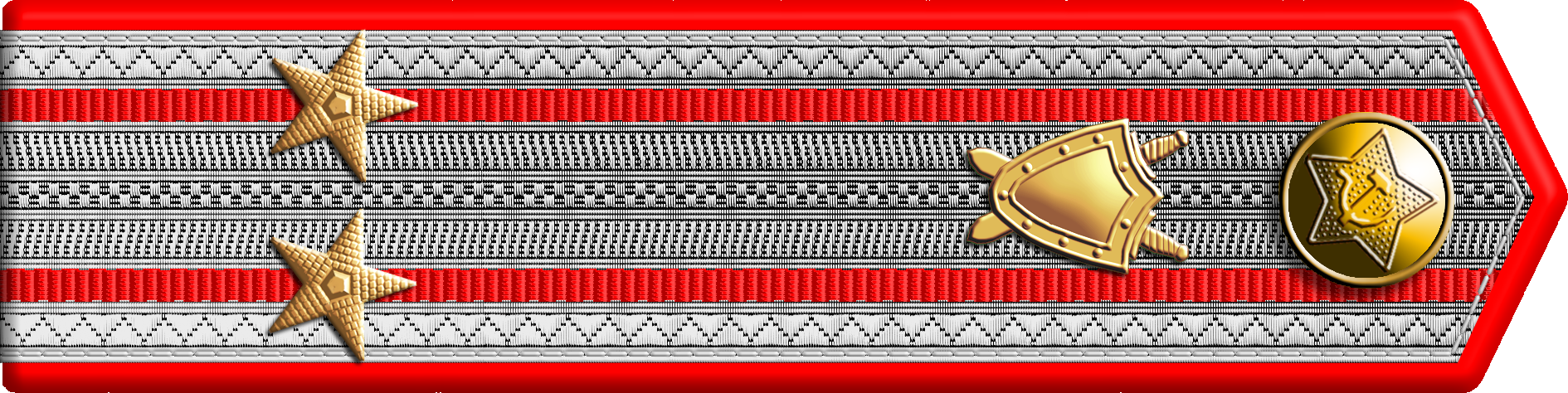
- Lieutenant Colonel of Justice.

Awards:

- Order of the Red Star,
- Order of the Red Banner.

Mother – Lydia Breeva, born in 1916, a native of Borisoglebsk, Voronezh region. A participant of the Great Patriotic War. Rank:

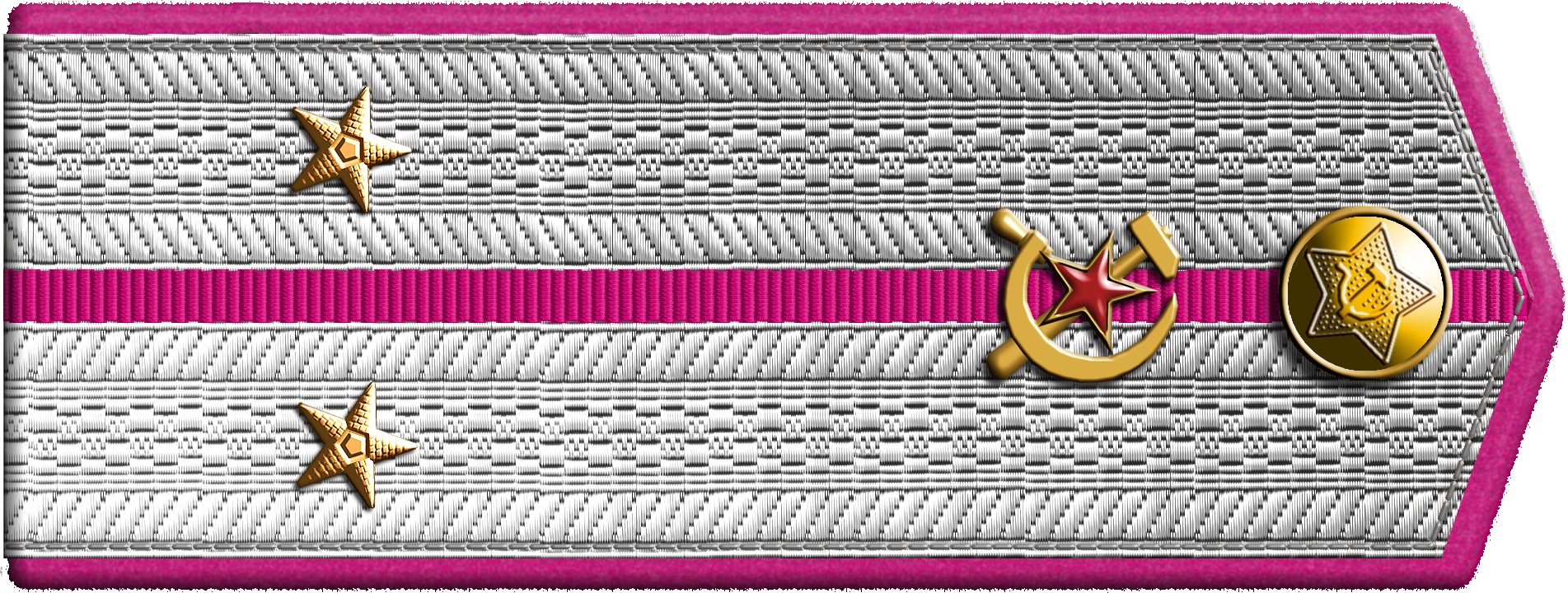
- Lieutenant of administrative service.

Awards:

- Medal "For Battle Merit",
- Order of the Patriotic War of the II degree.

== Biography ==
Vladimir Rubanov was born on July 2, 1944, in the village of Pervoye Sadovoye, Anninsky district, Voronezh region. 1963-1966 – service in the Armed Forces of the USSR. He studied at the Voronezh Polytechnic Institute at the aviation faculty. After graduation, having received a specialty “engineer – mechanical engineer in aircraft construction”, in 1970 he entered the Voronezh Aviation Plant. as a design engineer.

=== Professional activities ===
He worked for more than 20 years in the USSR State Security Committee, ending his service as Head of the Analytical Department in 1992. with the rank of colonel In 1989 he became Assistant Minister of Internal Affairs of the USSR. In 1990-1991. – Deputy Chairman of the RSFSR State Committee for Public Security and Cooperation with the USSR Ministry of Defense and the USSR State Security Committee. At the Institute of Socio-Political Research of the Russian Academy of Sciences, he was a chief researcher in 1998-2000. Since 1999, he has been consulting companies in the field of organization management. He is a columnist and author of articles in the Technology Forecast publication of the PwC Centre for Technology and Information.

From the assessments of colleagues:

Vladimir Rubanov’s main activity was not public, but the fact that he worked as Deputy Secretary of the Russian Security Council testifies to his uncommon abilities».

— Alexander Tsalko

Vladimir Arsentyevich Rubanov was not just a founding father of the Council on Foreign and Defence Policy, one of the «mighty four» who, in the most difficult time for the country, at the end of 1991, came up with and created a unique community».

— Fyodor Lukyanov

Vladimir Rubanov has been engaged in analytical research in the sphere of public administration (areas: high technologies, informatisation, intellectual and personnel potential of the military-industrial complex), national and international security, as well as the strategy of development of the scientific and industrial sphere of the country. In 1993 he was appointed Deputy Secretary of the Security Council of the Russian Federation. Since 1996 – Acting State Counsellor of the Russian Federation, 1st class.

=== Public activities ===
Vladimir Rubanov has been active in the Council on Foreign and Defense Policy since 1993, was its co-founder and an honorary member of the Presidium of the Council. From 1994 to 1997, he was a member of the Council for Cossacks under the President of the Russian Federation. Since 1997, he was vice-president of the League of Assistance to Defense Enterprises. At various times he was a member of the Expert Council on International Affairs of the Federation Council of the Federal Assembly of the Federal Assembly of the Russian Federation, and of the Public Council under the Ministry of Industry and Trade of Russia.

=== Scientific activity ===
Vladimir Rubanov is the creator of the «Semantic Topology Knowledge Base», co-author of the programme with the same name. In 2022 the three-volume monograph «I See the Meaning» was published (volume 1 – Metaphysics of Meanings; volume 2 – Meta-language and Calculus of Meanings; volume 3 – Knowledge Base «Semantic Topology. Atlas of conceptual models of universal meanings). This work has received evaluations from a number of scientists and organizations:

Vladimir Rubanov created «a precedent of semantic calculus, making topology generate or, at least, suggest new meanings».

— Zakhirdzhan Kuchkarov, Doctor of Economics, Candidate of Technical Sciences, Professor, Head of the Department of Conceptual Analysis and Design at MIPT.

The main merit of the author is in practical steps to achieve the unity of natural scientific and humanitarian knowledge. His approaches allow to comprehensively consider the new «digital reality» not only from technical, but, first of all, from socio-cultural positions.

— Gennady Osipov, Academician of the Russian Academy of Sciences, Director of the Higher School of Modern Social Sciences (Faculty) of Lomonosov Moscow State University, Head of the Joint Centre for Sociology and Knowledge Economy of the Institute of Sociology, FNISC RAS.

The developer is being offered a new way to solve a vast set of semantic problems that primarily relate to master data semantic models, which means the most important thing in the realm of information...

— From a report by analyst agency Gartner, Report ID: No. G00250574.

Vladimir Rubanov was the scientific director of Inteltek («Centre for Intelligent Information Technologies» – «CIIT Inteltek»), which was included in Gartner»s Cool Vendor 2013 list in the field of information and master data management and the scientific director of JSC «Operator of Spatial Data Services».

He was a member of the Skolkovo Foundation Expert Panel. He participated in the work of the Scientific Council on Economic Problems of Intellectual Property of the Social Sciences Department of the Russian Academy of Sciences.

He died on 7 December 2023 in Moscow, buried in Troekurovskoye cemetery.

== Awards ==
Among the awards:

- Medal "For Impeccable Service" 1st class (1988)
- Medal For Impeccable Service 2nd class (1983)
- Medal For Impeccable Service 3rd class (1978)
- Medal "Defender of a Free Russia" (1993)
- Jubilee Medal "Twenty Years of Victory in the Great Patriotic War 1941–1945" (1966)
- Jubilee Medal "60 Years of the Armed Forces of the USSR" (1978)
- Jubilee Medal "70 Years of the Armed Forces of the USSR" (1988)
- Honoured employee of The Federal Agency for Government Communications and Information under the President of the Russian Federation (с 1996 года)
- Winner of the Professional Award in the field of information security «Silver Dagger» (2005)

== Bibliography ==
=== Monographs ===
- Rubanov V. A. I see the meaning. Metaphysics of senses. – Moscow: LLC «Argo-Kniga», 2022. – Т. 1. – 366 с. – ISBN 978-5-517-09043-0.
- Rubanov V. A. Vizhuyu sensu. Meta-language and the calculus of meanings. – Moscow: LLC «Argo-Kniga», 2022. – Vol. 2. – 334 p. – ISBN 978-5-517-09043-0.
- Rubanov V. A. Vizhuyu semen. Knowledge base «Semantic topology». Atlas of conceptual models of universal meanings. – Moscow: LLC «Argo-Kniga», 2022. – Vol. 3. – 470 p. – ISBN 978-5-517-09043-0.
- Rubanov V. A. New Technologies // Russia and the World. A new epoch. 12 years that can change everything / Under general editorship: Karaganov S. A. А.. – Moscow: AST, Rus-Olympus, 2008. – С. 214-239. – 448 с. – ISBN 978-5-17-050151-9.
- Arshinov V. I., Lukyanchuk B. S., Nikolsky A. E., Rubanov V. A., Sheludyakov A. V. Communicative Waves – II / Rezentsev. V. Communicative Waves – II / Reviewer: D. I. Dubovsky, Doctor of Philosophy, Professor, Chief Scientific Associate of the Institute of Philosophy of the Russian Academy of Sciences. – Moscow: A. Y. Alekseev, «IIntell», 2019. – 178 с. – (Man and cyberphysical reality). – ISBN 978-5-98956-019-6.
- Milner B.Z., Makarov V.L., Mayevsky V. I., Silvestrov S. N., Dynkin A. A. A., Ivanova N. I., Kleiner G. B., Rubanov V. A., Kuzyk B. N. Innovative development: economy, intellectual resources, intellectual resources. N. Innovative development: economics, intellectual resources, knowledge management / Under the general editorship of B. Z. Milner. – Moscow: Infra-M, 2013. – 624 с. – (Scientific Thought). – ISBN 978-5-16-003649-6.
- Rubanov V. A. Politics is the harmonisation of interests // Problems of security and sustainability of socio-political development of Russian society / Co-editor. N. N. Efimov et al. Edited by G. V. Osipov, V. A. Rubanov. – Moscow: ISPI, 1994. – С. 16-24. – 149 с. – (Materials of theoretical and methodological seminar, 28 October 1993). – ISBN 5-7556-0003-1.
- Rubanov, V. A. Civil View of the Country»s Security // Pulse of Reforms: Lawyers and Political Scientists Reflect / Compiled by Baturin Y. M.. – Moscow: Progress, 1989. – С. 316-. – 370 с. – (Perestroika: glasnost, democracy, socialism).

=== Main articles ===
- When the «tyranny of indicators» is stronger than power. Today the mathematician Galois and the physicist Einstein would not even be associate professors. https://www.ng.ru/. Nezavisimaya gazeta (22 April 2019). Date of access: 22 April 2019. Archived 24 April 2019.
- Arshinov V. I., Lukyanchuk B. S., Nikolsky A. E., Rubanov V. A., Sheludyakov A.. V. Semiotics and semantics of communicative waves of «subconsciousness». To topical issues of structural semiotics. Part I // NBICS: Nauka.Tekhnologii : journal. – 2018. – Т. 2, No 3. – С. 17-30.
- Rubanov V. A., Sheludyakov A. V. Semantic topology: knowledge representation // Information wars : a journal. V. Semantic topology: knowledge representation // Information wars : journal. – 2011. – No 1 (17). – ISSN 1996-4544.
- Rubanov V. A. Semantic construction in the cloud of possibilities // PwC» Center for Technology and Innovation Technological Forecast : a quarterly journal. – PwC, 2010. – Vol. 4. – С. 7-14. Archived 6 March 2012.
- Rubanov V. A. Between Management Standards and the Information Element // PwC» Centre for Technology and Innovation Technological Forecast : Quarterly Journal. – PwC, 2010. – Vol. 3. – С. 7-14. Archived 21 December 2010.
- Rubanov V. A. Notation for corporate symphonies // PwC» Centre for Technology and Innovation Technological Forecast : quarterly magazine. – PwC, 2010. – Vol. 2. – С. 7-16. Archived 5 December 2010.
- Rubanov V. A. Management consulting: projection of world experience on Russian practice // PwC» Centre for Technology and Innovation Technological forecast : quarterly journal. – PwC, 2010. – Vol. 1. – С. 12-17. Archived 14 November 2011.
- Rubanov V. A. Subject of Technological Modernisation // Svobodnaya Mysli-XXI: Theoretical and Political Journal. – 2002. – November (No 11 (1525)). – С. 22-27. – ISSN 0869-4435.
- Karaganov S., Kobrinskaya I., Rubanov V.A., Pushkov A., Pyadyshev B., Bykov A.. «Russian diplomacy has achieved more than the internal possibilities» // International Life : Monthly Journal. – 1998. – No 11-12. – ISSN 0130-9635.
- Rubanov V. A. Security and the Future of Russia // Svobodnaya Mysl : Theoretical and Political Journal. – «Press», 1995. – November (No. 10). – С. 3-11.
- Rubanov V. A. Security – slogans, theory and political practice // Svobodnaya Mysl : Theoretical and political journal. – «Pravda», 1991. – November (No. 17 (1387)). – С. 31-41.
- Rubanov V. A. From the «cult of secrecy» – to information culture // Central Committee of the CPSU Kommunist : Theoretical and political journal. – Publishing house of the Central Committee of the CPSU Pravda, 1988. – September (No. 13 (1329)). – С. 24-36. Archived 14 November 2011.

=== Interviews ===
- Svetlana Sukhova. Vladimir Rubanov: «You can»t win by propaganda. You can win by dominance in technology» // Ogonyok : magazine. – 2016. – 10 October (No. 40). Archived 21 August 2022.
- Artyom Rusakovich. Vladimir Rubanov: «There is a misconception that special services play an independent role» // Gazeta. – 2007. – 20 December (No. 239). Archived 3 April 2017.
