= Nikolai Klimashin =

- Native name: Николай Климашин
- Born: 3 December 1952 (age 73)
- Allegiance: Soviet Union; Russia
- Branch: FSB
- Rank: Army general

Nikolai Vasilyevich Klimashin (Russian: Николай Васильевич Климашин; born December 3, 1952) is Russian intelligence officer who served as head of the Scientific and Technical Service of the Federal Security Service from 2004 to 2010. He holds the rank of General of the Army (2009) and is Active State Advisor of the Russian Federation, 2nd class (2013).

== Biography ==
Born December 3, 1952. He served as the head of the Federal Security Service regional branch for the Novgorod Oblast. In 1999, he was appointed Deputy Director of the FSB and awarded the rank of Colonel General.

In March 2003, he was appointed 1st Deputy Director of the FSB of Russia and Acting Director General of the Federal Agency for Government Communications and Information under the President of the Russian Federation (FAPSI), which was in the process of liquidation (mostly completed by the summer of that year).

From July 2004 to October 2010 he served as head of the Scientific and Technical Service of the Federal Security Service (with the powers of the 1st Deputy Director of the FSB of Russia). In February 2010, he was awarded the Certificate of Honor of the Federation Council, the upper house of the Federal Assembly of Russia, thanks to which it became known that he had been awarded the military rank of General of the Army. From October 29, 2010 he served as Assistant Secretary of the Security Council of Russia From June 3, 2011 to December 3, 2013 he served as Deputy Secretary of the Security Council of Russia. He headed the interdepartmental commission of the Security Council of Russia on information security.

He was a member of several government commissions and councils:

- State Commission on Chemical Disarmament
- Council for Awarding Prizes of the Government of the Russian Federation in Science and Technology (2001-2004)
- Commission of the Government of the Russian Federation on Military-Industrial Issues (2004-2006)
- Government Council on Nanotechnology (since 2007).

He is an advisor to the chairman of the board of directors of the Sistema corporation.
