= Minister of Internal Affairs (Russia) =

Russian government ministry

Minister of Internal Affairs of the Russian Federation
- Министр внутренних дел Российской Федерации
- Emblem of the Ministry of Internal Affairs

- Flag of the Ministry of Internal Affairs

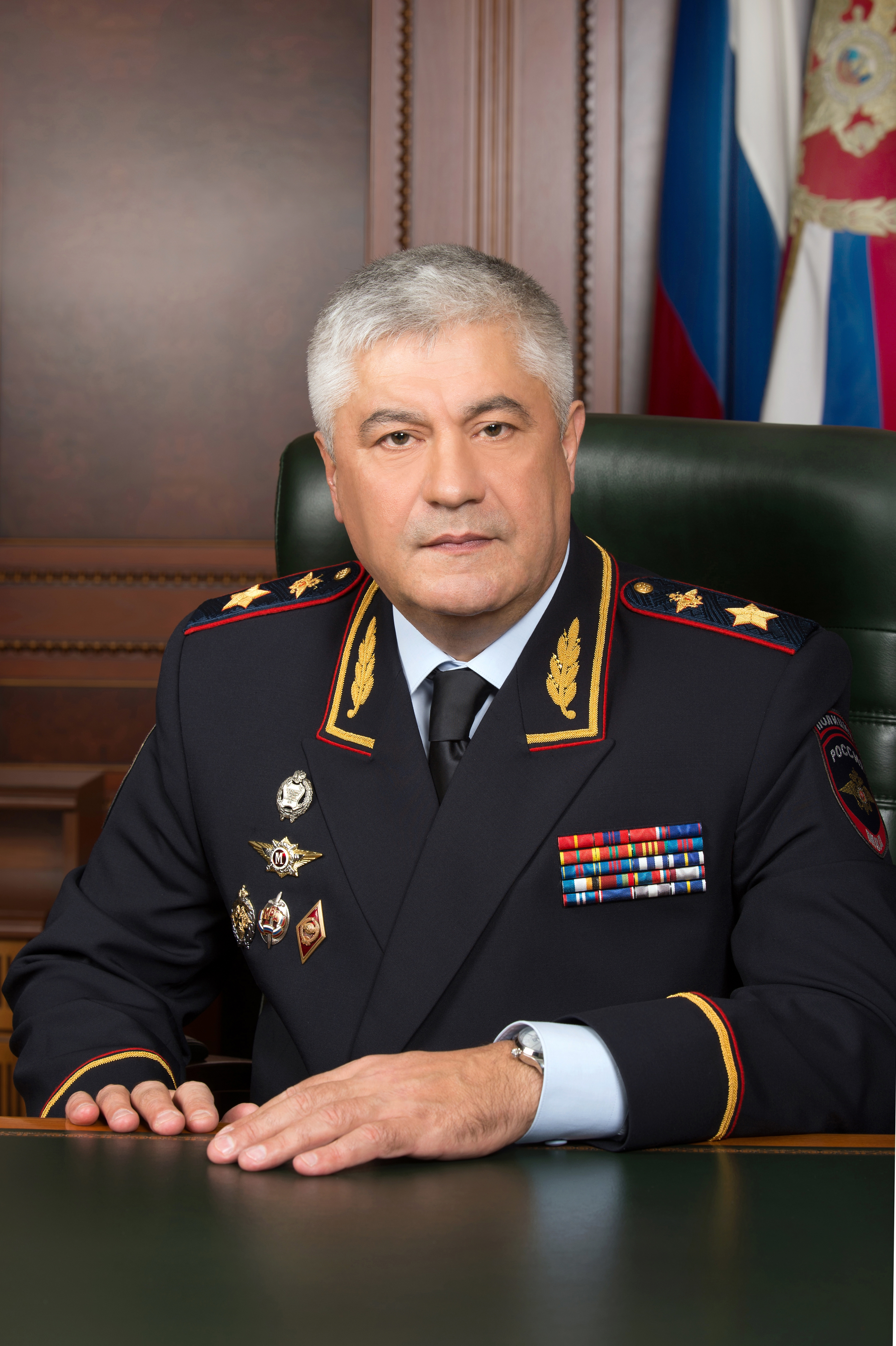
- Incumbent; Vladimir Kolokoltsev since 21 May 2012
- Ministry of Internal Affairs
- Style: Mr. Minister
- Member of: Government, Security Council
- Reports to: The president
- Seat: Moscow
- Appointer: The president
- Term length: No fixed term
- Formation: September 8, 1802
- First holder: Viktor Kochubey

The minister of internal affairs of the Russian Federation is the head of the Russian Ministry of Internal Affairs. The minister is appointed by the president of Russia upon recommendation of the prime minister. The current minister of internal affairs is Vladimir Kolokoltsev.

== Powers ==
According to the regulations of the Ministry of Internal Affairs of the Russian Federation, the minister:

- distributes duties between Deputy Ministers, sets out the powers of the officials of the interior Ministry of Russia for the independent Commission on internal Affairs bodies of tasks;
- creates, within its scope of competence of the territorial bodies of MIA of Russia, organizations and subdivisions necessary to perform the tasks and exercise the powers conferred on the Ministry of internal Affairs of Russia carries out their reorganization and liquidation in accordance with the legislation of the Russian Federation;
- issue regulatory legal acts, including in conjunction with the heads of other Federal Executive bodies; concludes interagency agreements, international treaties of the Russian Federation interdepartmental nature in the field of internal Affairs;
- submit to the President of the Russian Federation and the government of the Russian Federation:
  - draft legislative and other regulatory legal acts of the Russian Federation on issues related to the field of internal Affairs;
  - ideas about conferring state awards of the Russian Federation, Honorary diploma of the President of the Russian Federation, Honorary diploma of the Government of the Russian Federation of employees of internal Affairs **bodies, Federal state civil servants and employees of the interior Ministry of Russia and other persons assisting in performing the tasks and exercising the powers conferred on the Ministry of internal Affairs of Russia, and **also ideas about the announcement of gratitude of the President of the Russian Federation or the Government of the Russian Federation;
- submit to the President of the Russian Federation:
  - representations about appointment to positions which are subject to replacement by persons of the higher commanding personnel in the organs of internal Affairs, and exemption from these posts;
  - proposals for the inclusion of the posts of officers in the list of posts of the higher commanding personnel in the organs of internal Affairs;
  - ideas about assignment of special ranks of the higher commanding structure to employees of internal Affairs bodies;
  - presentation on the extension of the period of service of employees of internal Affairs bodies occupying positions for senior ranks and have reached the age limit of stay on service in bodies of internal Affairs;
  - ideas about the laying on of the staff of bodies of internal Affairs of the provisional duty for the vacant posts of the higher commanding structure;
  - proposals for the establishment of insignia and other official symbols of the Ministry of internal Affairs of Russia;
  - proposal on the composition of the police, concerning the determination of the order of creation, reorganization and liquidation of its units, organizations and services;
- submit to the Prime Minister of the Russian Federation for subsequent submission to the President of the Russian Federation:
  - proposals on the appointment and dismissal of Deputy Ministers;
  - proposals on the limit of regular number of bodies of internal Affairs;
  - proposals on the budgetary allocations of the Federal budget on the maintenance of employees of internal Affairs bodies;
  - offers on limiting number and Fund of payment of labour of the Federal state civil servants and employees of the interior Ministry of Russia;
  - the draft provision of the Ministry of internal Affairs of Russia;
- Approve:
  - regulations on structural subdivisions of the Central apparatus of the MIA of Russia, the provisions (model provisions) of the territorial bodies of the Ministry of internal Affairs (with the exception of the model regulations on territorial body of the MIA of Russia in the subject of the Russian Federation), standard regulations on structural divisions of territorial bodies of the Ministry of internal Affairs of Russia, regulations on saranapala of the MIA of Russia, charters (model statutes) organizations of the Ministry of internal Affairs of Russia;
  - staffing of structural subdivisions of the Central apparatus of the MIA of Russia, Main administration of the MIA of Russia for North Caucasian Federal district, territorial bodies of the MIA of Russia at the interregional level (with the exception of linear managements of the Ministry of internal Affairs of Russia on railway, water and air transport), saranapala of the MIA of Russia and organizations of the Ministry of interior of Russia within the limits established by the President of the Russian Federation the limit of regular number of bodies of internal Affairs, limiting number and Fund of payment of labour of the Federal state civil servants and employees of the interior Ministry of Russia, as well as standard staffing divisions of territorial bodies of the MIA of Russia and organizations of MIA of Russia, the model structure and standards of regular number of territorial bodies of the MIA of Russia and organizations of MIA of Russia, their number of staff;
  - the scheme of placing of territorial bodies of the MIA of Russia and their subordination;
  - the layout of the organizations of the system of the MIA of Russia and their subordination;
  - list of posts filled by persons of ordinary structure, younger, average and senior commanding personnel in the organs of internal Affairs, and corresponding to these positions of special titles;
  - the regulations on the Board of the interior Ministry of Russia;
  - regulations on the coordinating, consultative, expert and Advisory bodies (councils, boards), including interdepartmental, formed by the Ministry of internal Affairs of Russia, as well as the composition of these bodies;
  - provisions on the departmental insignia, including medals and breast signs, as well as on the diploma of the Ministry of internal Affairs of Russia, a description of them;
  - personalized insignia, and personal standards of the governing officials of the interior Ministry of Russia, as well as the list of senior officers for which personal standards are established, and the order of presentation of these standards;
  - rules concerning uniforms, insignia, special clothing and equipment; samples of service certificates, a special badge with a personal number, badge;
- establish scholarships determines the amount and terms of payment of these stipends to the cadets and students of Federal state educational institutions administered by the Ministry of internal Affairs of Russia, as well as instituting awards in the field of literature and art for works that promote the activity of internal Affairs bodies; in the field of science and technology for achievements in the development of scientific and technological activities in the interests of the internal Affairs bodies;
- Defines:
  - the order of realization by employees of internal Affairs bodies of authority outside the territory served by the territorial body of the MIA of Russia;
  - the accountability of officials of internal Affairs bodies in front of the legislative (representative) bodies of state power of subjects of the Russian Federation, representative bodies of municipalities and to the citizens, as well as frequency of reporting and category of the officers who report to those agencies and citizens.
  - the procedure for mandatory state fingerprinting of employees of internal Affairs bodies;
  - the order of registration of the personal security of the citizen of the Russian Federation arriving on service in bodies of internal Affairs;
  - the order of conducting private Affairs of employees of internal Affairs bodies, Federal state civil servants and employees of the interior Ministry of Russia;
  - the order of the Central register of personal data of employees of internal Affairs bodies and citizens of the Russian Federation arriving on service in bodies of internal Affairs;
  - the order of involvement of employees of bodies of internal Affairs to performance of official duties over the established duration of weekly service time, also at night, on weekends and public holidays; providing the employees of internal Affairs bodies additional rest, additional days of rest and order of payment of monetary compensation instead of provision of additional days of rest;
  - the procedure for changing the mode of on-duty time of employees of bodies of internal Affairs, assuming additional responsibilities of sending them to another area, temporary relocation to another unit without changing the nature of the service, as well as the establishment of other special conditions and additional restrictions during the period of martial law or state of emergency, the period of holding the counterterrorist operation, in armed conflict, elimination of consequences of accidents, catastrophes of natural and technogenic character and other emergency situations;
  - the procedure for passing by citizens of the Russian Federation, accepted on service in bodies of internal Affairs, vocational training;
  - the procedure for the use of the heraldic sign - the emblem of internal Affairs bodies;
  - the procedure of affixing the apostille on the certificates and archival documents to export abroad;
- determines the procedure of providing officers of the internal Affairs agencies allowance; sets, on the basis of salaries on typical posts of employees of internal Affairs bodies, approved by the Government of the Russian Federation, the sizes of salaries (tariff level) on other (non-standard) positions corresponding categories of employees of internal Affairs bodies, and also sets the additional payments made to employees of bodies of internal Affairs within the limits of budgetary allocations envisaged in the Federal budget of the Ministry of internal Affairs of Russia;
- appoint and release from office within its competence of employees of internal Affairs bodies and the Federal state civil servants of system of the Ministry of internal Affairs of Russia;
- decides in accordance with the legislation of the Russian Federation the questions connected with passage of Federal state civil service and employment in the Ministry of internal Affairs; exercise the powers of the representative of the employer on behalf of the Russian Federation concerning Federal state civil servants of system of the Ministry of internal Affairs of Russia;
- prokomentiroval employees of internal Affairs bodies and the state authorities of the Russian Federation, as well as to organizations in accordance with the legislation of the Russian Federation;
- sets the limits of its competence, the procedure for selection of candidates for service in organs of internal Affairs, as well as the procedure for training in Federal public educational institutions administered by the Ministry of internal Affairs of Russia;
- is of the MIA of Russia in relations with Federal bodies of state power, other state bodies, bodies of state power of subjects of the Russian Federation, bodies of local self-government and bodies of state power of foreign States and international organizations;
- cancels contradicting the Constitution of the Russian Federation, legislative and other regulatory legal acts of the Russian Federation, including normative legal acts of the MIA of Russia, decisions of officials of the interior Ministry of Russia;
- shall conclude sectoral collective agreement;
- defines the procedure of application is valid and conditional names in the bodies of internal Affairs shall assign in the prescribed manner such name;
- Defines:
  - on the basis of decisions of the Government of the Russian Federation temporary rules of poliennali weapons, ammunition and other logistical resources for internal Affairs bodies participating in the inter-regional and other **special operations and events;
  - temporary rules of the food rations for employees of internal Affairs bodies in case of natural disasters and other emergencies, as well as in their individual operational tasks;
- makes in the prescribed manner to the Ministry of Finance proposals for the formation of the Federal budget;
- has the premium and gift funds (including funds of firearms and bladed weapons) for awarding of employees of internal Affairs bodies, Federal state civil servants and employees of the interior Ministry of Russia, and also other persons assisting in performing the tasks and exercising the powers conferred on the Ministry of internal Affairs of Russia;
- awards departmental awards employees of internal Affairs bodies, Federal state civil servants and employees of the interior Ministry of Russia and other persons who assisted in performing the tasks and exercising the powers conferred on the Ministry of the interior; pays in the prescribed manner the cash compensation (cash bonuses) and other uses provided for by regulatory legal acts of the MIA of Russia types of incentives;
- confers honorary titles of the units of territorial bodies of MIA of Russia, the organizations of the Ministry of internal Affairs of Russia;
- organizes the work of the Central apparatus of the MIA of Russia, approves the internal regulations;
- administers the State anti-drug Committee;
- exercise other powers in accordance with the legislation of the Russian Federation.
