= Orders, decorations, and medals of Turkmenistan =

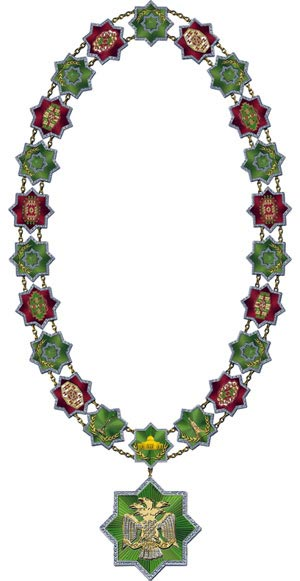
The Watan Order.

State awards of Turkmenistan include the orders, decorations, and medals. The following is a list of these awards of Turkmenistan.

== Types of State Awards ==
=== Highest awards ===
The title of "Türkmenistanyň Gahrymany" (Hero of Turkmenistan) is the highest degree of distinction of Turkmenistan and is assigned only to citizens of Turkmenistan for particularly outstanding services to the state and society.

=== Order ===
By seniority:

- Watan Order
- Order of Saparmurat Türkmenbaşy the Great
- Star of President Order
- Oguzkhan Star Order
- Order of Turkmenbashi
- Order of Altyn Asyr
- Order of Independence
- Order of Neutrality
- Order "For the Love of Turkmenistan"
- Galkynyş Order
- Order of Ruhubelent
- Order of the Female Soul
- Order "For Contribution to the Development of Cooperation"

=== Medals ===
- Altyn Ay Medal
- Medal "Veteran of the Armed Forces"
- Medal "Edermenlik"
- Medal "For impeccable service to the Fatherland"
- Medal "For the love of the Fatherland"
- Breastplate of Merdan Serchetchi

==== Anniversary medals ====
- Jubilee Medal "19 years of Independence of Turkmenistan"
- Jubilee Medal "20 years of Independence of Turkmenistan"
- Jubilee Medal "25 years of Independence of Turkmenistan"
- Jubilee Medal "25 years of Neutrality of Turkmenistan"
- Jubilee Medal "60 Years of the Victory in the Great Patriotic War 1941–1945"
- Jubilee Medal "75 Years of the Victory in the Great Patriotic War 1941–1945" (joint CIS award, minted in Russia and distributed by the authorities of the CIS countries)
- Jubilee Medal "30 years of Independence of Turkmenistan"

=== Titles ===
- People's Teacher of Turkmenistan
- People's Doctor of Turkmenistan
- People's Horse Breeder of Turkmenistan
- People's Artist of Turkmenistan
- People's Artist of Turkmenistan
- People's writer of Turkmenistan
- People's Bakhshi of Turkmenistan
- Honored Worker of Science and Technology of Turkmenistan
- Honored Worker of Industry of Turkmenistan
- Honored Carpet of Turkmenistan
- Honored Builder of Turkmenistan
- Honored Architect of Turkmenistan
- Honored Worker of Transport of Turkmenistan
- Honored Communications Worker of Turkmenistan
- Honored Worker of Agriculture
- Honored Horse Breeder of Turkmenistan
- Honored Land Surveyor of Turkmenistan
- Honored Worker of Health of Turkmenistan
- Honored Worker of Culture of Turkmenistan
- Honored Artist of Turkmenistan
- Honored Bakhshi of Turkmenistan
- Honored Artist of Turkmenistan
- Honored Journalist of Turkmenistan
- Honored Worker of Education of Turkmenistan
- Honored Worker in the Field of Public Services of Turkmenistan
- Honored Lawyer of Turkmenistan
- Honored Economist of Turkmenistan
- Honored Pilot of Turkmenistan
- Honored Master of Sports of Turkmenistan
- Honored Coach of Turkmenistan
- Honorary Elder of the People of Turkmenistan
- Master of the Profession of the Golden Age of Turkmenistan
- Mother Heroine
- Master Jockey-Mentor of Turkmenistan

==== Former ====
- People's Artist of the Turkmen SSR - It was established 28 February 1940. It was appropriated by the Presidium of the Supreme Council of the Turkmen SSR to outstanding artists who were particularly distinguished in the development of theater, music and cinema. As a rule, it was awarded no earlier than five years after the conferment of the honorary title "Honored Artist of the Turkmen SSR" It was last awarded in 1982 to Maya-Gozel Aimedova.
- Honored Artist of the Turkmen SSR - It was first awarded in 1957 was Georgy Menglet. The last person awarded this honorary title in 1986 was Khodzhakuli Narliev, the director of Turkmenfilm.

== Gallery ==
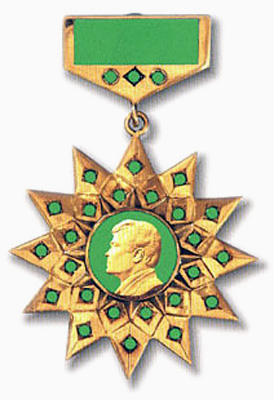
Star of President Order

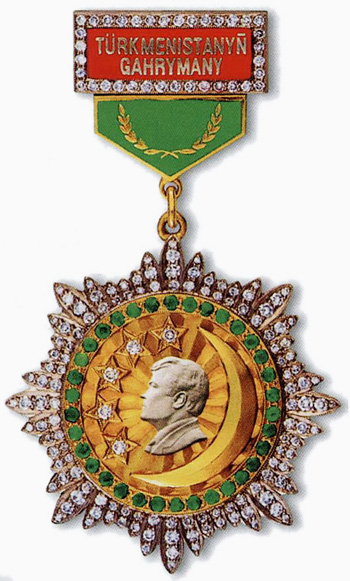
Golden Moon Medal

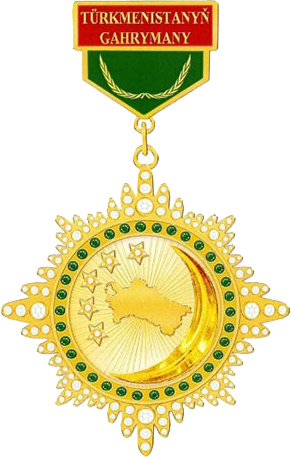
Hero of Turkmenistan Gold Star

For the love of Turkmenistan Order

Order of Neutrality
