= Order of Neutrality =

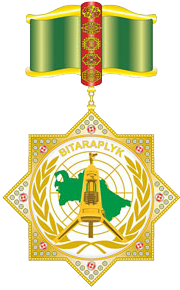
- Native name: Bitaraplyk Ordany
- Type: Order of merit
- Country: Turkmenistan
- Eligibility: Citizens of Turkmenistan and foreign nationals
- Status: Active
- Established: 17 December 1998

Precedence
- Next (higher): Order of Independence
- Next (lower): Order "For the love of Turkmenistan"

The Order of Neutrality (Turkmen: Bitaraplyk Ordany) is a state decoration of Turkmenistan. It was instituted on December 17, 1998 by the Assembly of Turkmenistan to honour its official neutrality. Recipients receive a single lump-sum bonus equal to 15 times the baseline monthly minimum wage. Additionally, the recipient receives a pension supplement that is constitutionally exempt from state income taxes.

== Notable Recipients ==
- Saparmurat Niyazov, first President of Turkmenistan.
- Gurbanguly Berdimuhamedow, second President of Turkmenistan (December 9, 2020)
- Hamad bin Isa Al Khalifa, King of Bahrain (March 18, 2019)
- Kim Jin-pyo, Speaker of the National Assembly of South Korea (July 21, 2023)

== See also ==
- Orders, decorations, and medals of Turkmenistan
- Foreign relations of Turkmenistan
