= Rustam Minnikhanov =

Head of Tatarstan since 2010

- Рустам Минниханов; Рөстәм Миңнеханов
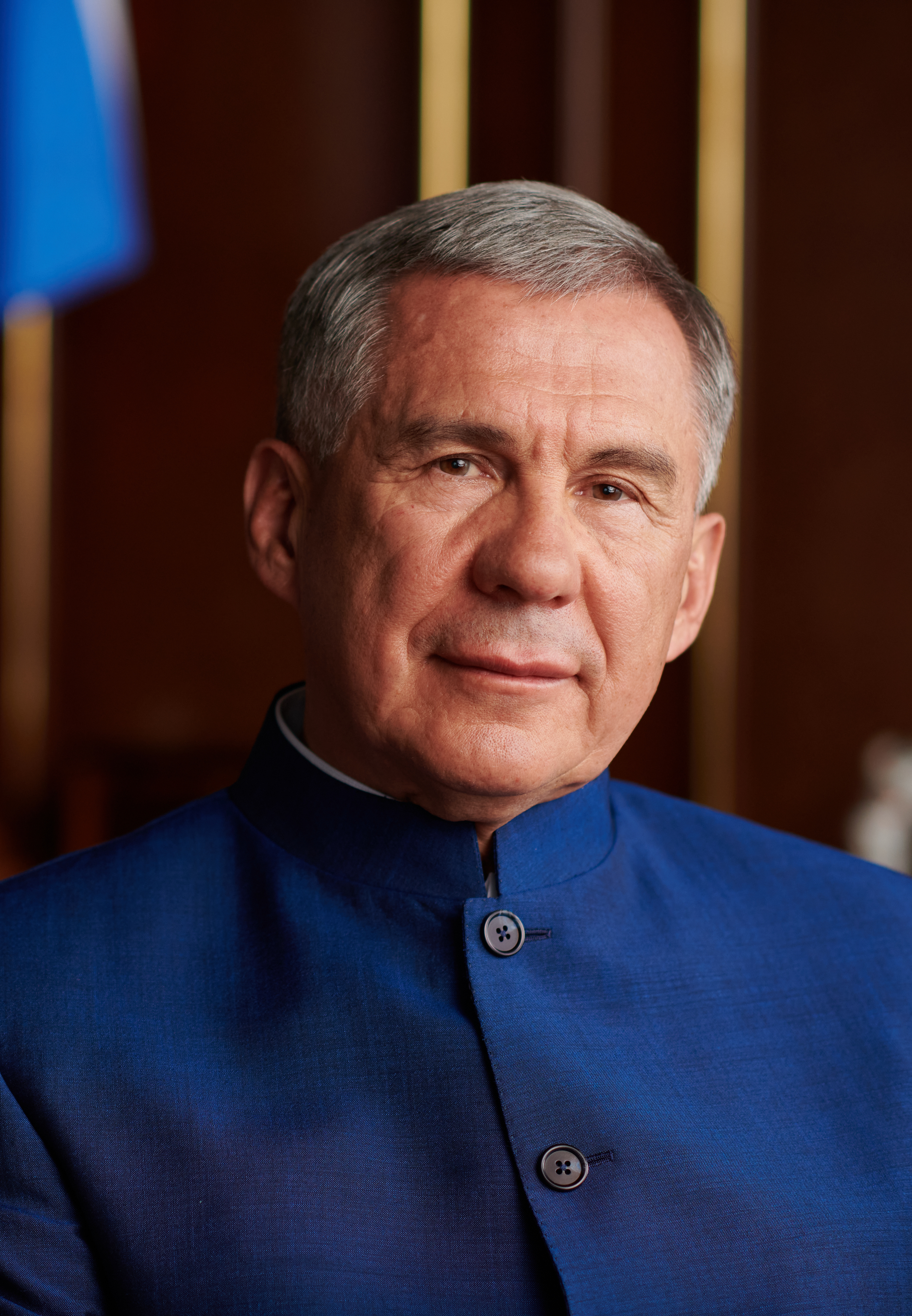
- Official portrait, 2020

2nd Head of Tatarstan
- Incumbent
- Assumed office 25 March 2010
- Prime Minister: Ravil Muratov (acting); Ildar Khalikov; Alexei Pesoshin
- Preceded by: Mintimer Shaimiev

Prime Minister of Tatarstan
- In office 10 July 1998 – 25 March 2010
- Preceded by: Mintimer Shaimiev (acting)
- Succeeded by: Ildar Khalikov

Minister of Finance of Tatarstan
- In office 1996 – 10 July 1998

Personal details
- Born: Rustam Nurgaliyevich Minnikhanov; 1 March 1957 (age 69) Novyi Arysh, Tatar ASSR, Russian SFSR, Soviet Union
- Party: United Russia
- Spouse: Gulsina Minnikhanova
- Children: 2
- Education: Kazan Agricultural Institute Correspondence Institute of Soviet Trade (Moscow)

Rustam Nurgaliyevich Minnikhanov (Note: Russian: Рустам Нургалиевич Минниханов; Tatar: Рөстәм Нургали улы Миңнеханов) (born 1 March 1957) is a Russian politician who has served as the head of Tatarstan, a federal subject of Russia, since 2010.

== Early life and education ==
Rustam Minnikhanov was born on 1 March 1957, in a Volga Tatar family in the New Arysh (Note: Russian: Новый Арыш, romanized: Novyi Arysh; Tatar: Яңа Арыш, romanized: Yaña Arış) village of Rybno-Slobodsky District in the Tatar ASSR.

He graduated from Kazan Agricultural Institute in 1978 as mechanical engineer and from Correspondence Institute of Soviet Trade as a commodity expert in 1986. He is a doctor of economic sciences.

== Career ==
After graduating from the institute in 1978, he began his career as an engineer in Sabinsky District Association of Selkhoztekhnika. He then worked in the district as a senior engineer and chief power engineer in a state timber industry enterprise and was deputy chairman of District Consumer Society Board.

From 1985 to 1993, he worked in Arsky District as chairman of the District Consumer Society Board, Chairman of the Executive Committee of People's Deputies District Council, First Deputy Head of District Administration.

In 1993, he was appointed head of Vysokogorsky District administration.

=== Minister of Finance (1996–1998) ===
In November 1996 Minnikhanov was appointed minister of finance of the Republic of Tatarstan.

=== Prime Minister of Tatarstan (1998–2010) ===
From 10 July 1998 to 25 March 2010, Minnikhanov was prime minister of the Republic of Tatarstan.

As prime minister, he was known for his enthusiasm for technological innovation, spearheading the republic's move to digital, paperless government and the streamlining of official business through the use of electronically distributed documents and electronic signing of official documents.

=== President of Tatarstan (2010–2021) ===
On 27 January 2010, Russian President Dmitry Medvedev nominated Minnikhanov to be the new president of Tatarstan and on 25 March 2010, Minnikhanov formally assumed the office of President. His ceremony was presented on Channel One Russia by Maxim Sharafutdinov.

=== Head of Tatarstan (2021–present) ===
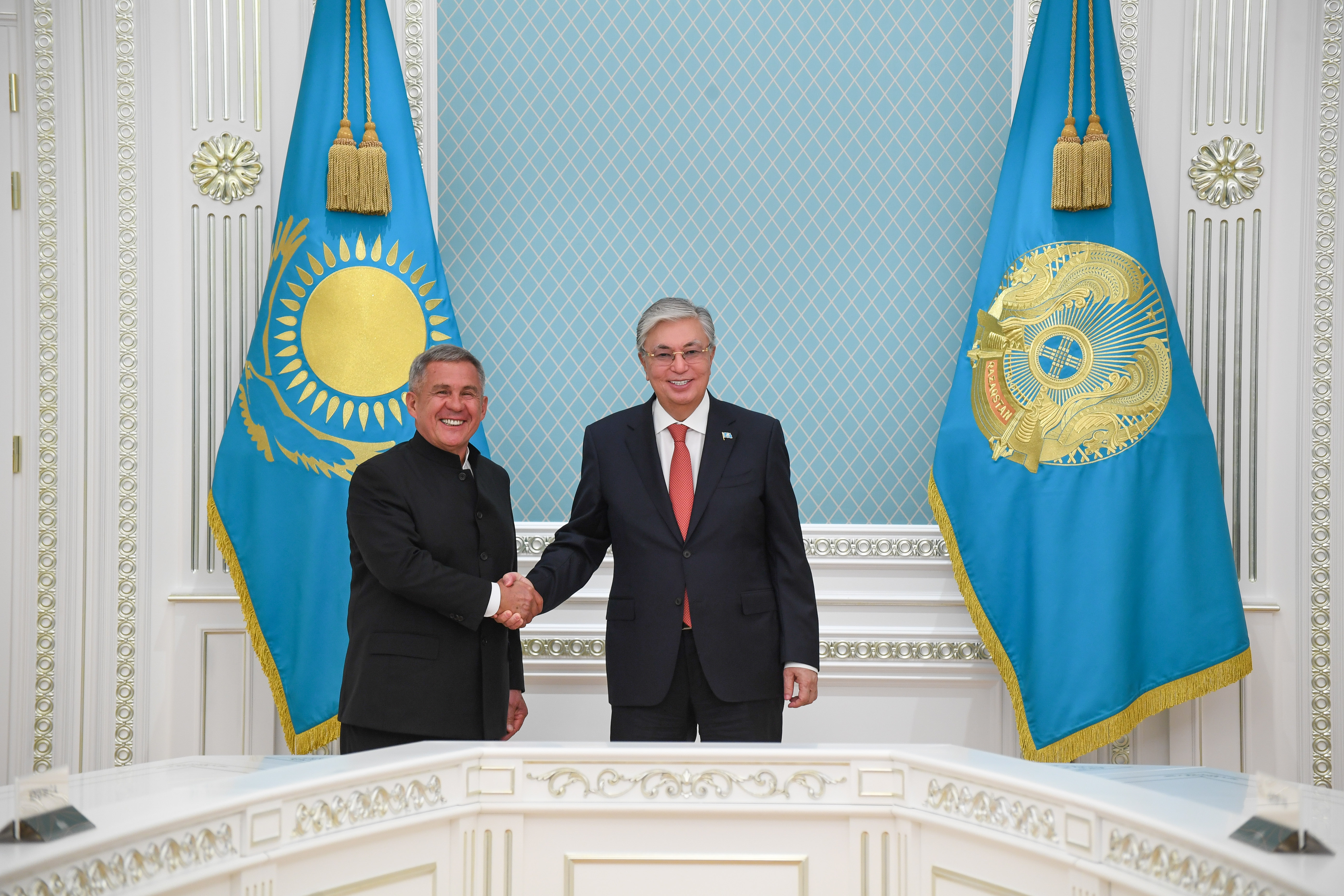
Minnikhanov with Kazakh President Kassym-Jomart Tokayev in Astana, Kazakhstan, 25 September 2023

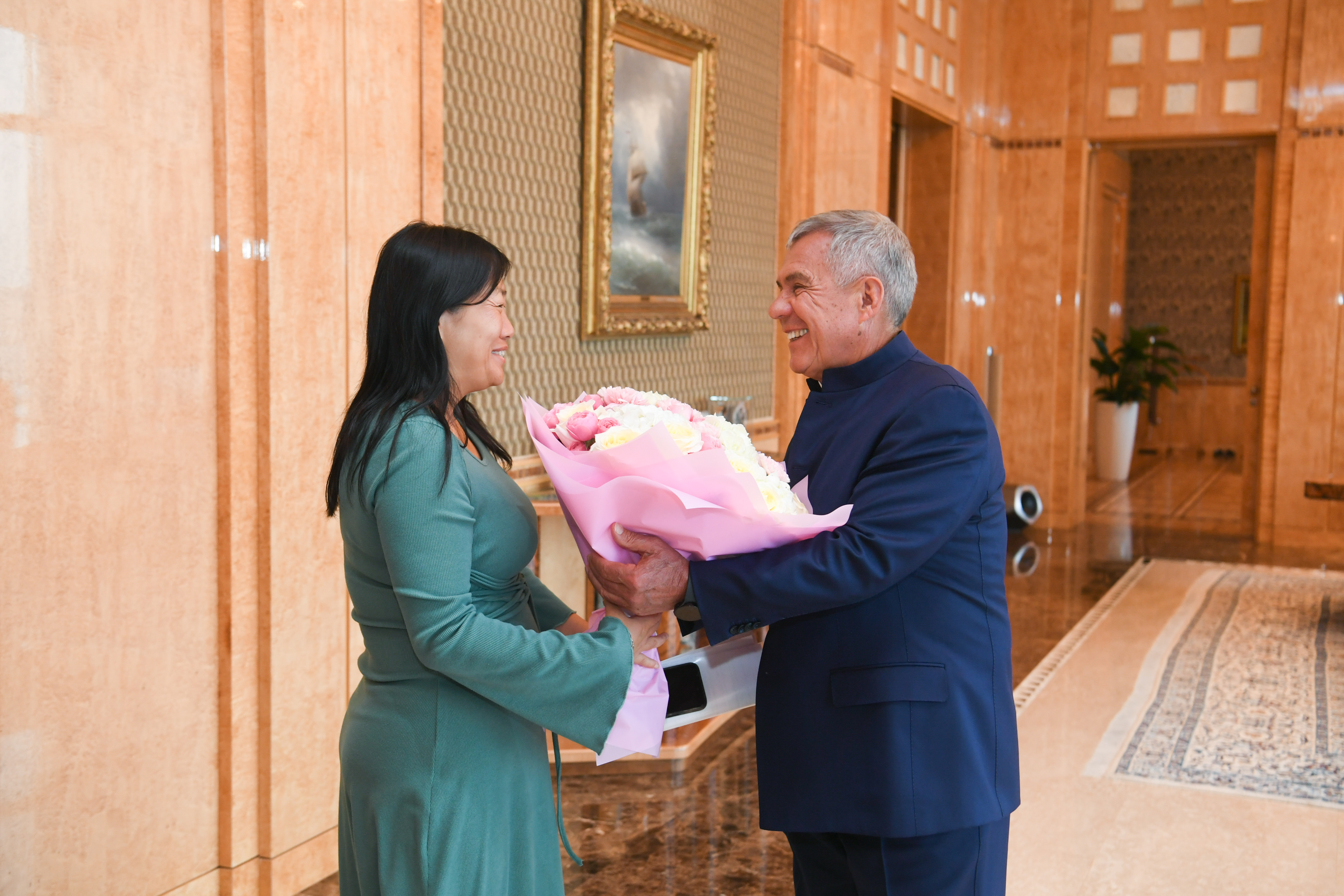
Minnikhanov with Russian-Korean billionaire Tatyana Kim, 25 March 2024

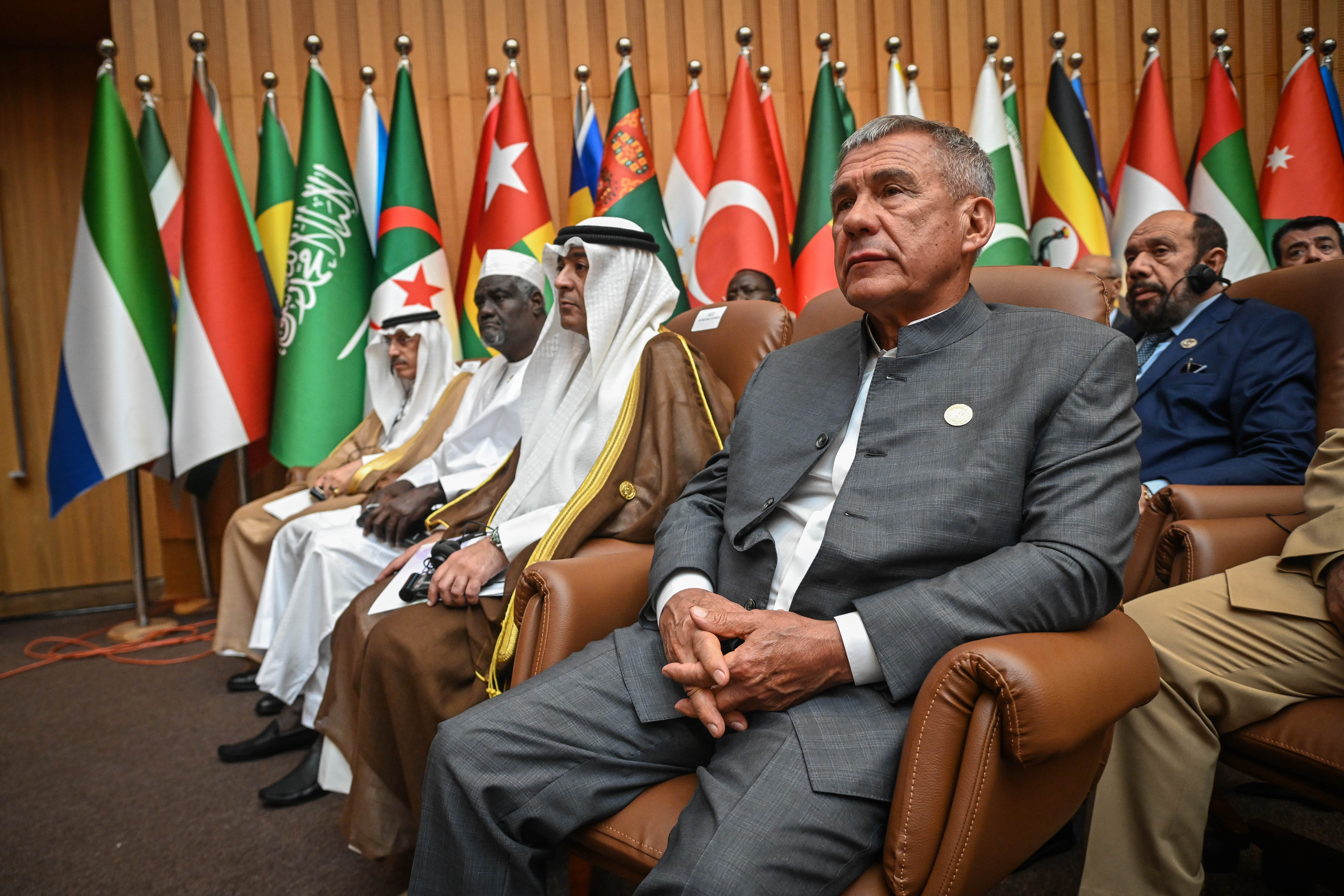
Minnikhanov at the 15th Summit of the Organisation of Islamic Cooperation, 4 May 2024

In December 2021, Putin signed a law abolishing regional presidencies, and as such Minnikhanov's title, despite protests from Tatarstan’s regional assembly and other cultural and political figures.

==== 2014 welcome committee for Crimea ====
During the annexation of Crimea by the Russian Federation, Minnikhanov acted as a mediator between the Kremlin government and the Crimean Tatar community over concerns raised amongst Crimean Tatars over potential persecution by Russia should it annex the peninsula. On 5 March Minnikhanov signed an agreement on co-operation between Tatarstan and the Aksyonov government in Crimea that implied collaboration between ten government institutions as well as significant financial aid to Crimea from Tatarstan businesses. On 11 March Minnikhanov was in Crimea on his second visit and attended as a guest in the Crimean parliament chamber during the vote on the declaration of sovereignty pending 16 March referendum. The Tatarstan Mufti Kamil Samigullin invited Crimean Tatars to study in madrasas in Kazan, and declared support for their "brothers in faith and blood".

Following news of Crimea's independence referendum organized with the help of Russia on 16 March 2014, the Kurultai leadership voiced concerns of renewed persecution, as commented by a U.S. official before the visit of a UN human rights team to the peninsula. At the same time, Minnikhanov was dispatched to Crimea to quell Crimean Tatars' concerns and to state that "in the 23 years of Ukraine's independence the Ukrainian leaders have been using Crimean Tatars as pawns in their political games without doing them any tangible favors". The issue of Crimean Tatar persecution by Russia has since been raised regularly on an international level. On 18 March, the day Crimea was annexed by Russia, and Crimean Tatar was de jure declared one of the three official languages of Crimea. It was also announced that Crimean Tatars will be required to relinquish coastal lands on which they squatted since their return to Crimea in the early 1990s and be given land elsewhere in Crimea. Crimea stated it needed the relinquished land for "social purposes", since part of this land is occupied by the Crimean Tatars without legal documents of ownership. The situation was caused by the inability of the USSR (and later Ukraine) to sell the land to Crimean Tatars at a reasonable price instead of giving back to the Tatars the land owned before deportation, once they or their descendants returned from Central Asia (mainly Uzbekistan). As a consequence, some Crimean Tatars settled as squatters, occupying land that was not legally registered.

==== 2017 Iranian envoy ====
On 20 April 2017 Minnikhanov was Putin's envoy to meet with candidate Ebrahim Raisi in Mashhad in Raisi's capacity as Head of Astan Quds Razavi. MP Alireza Rahimi questioned the meeting and asked for explanations about the reasons for it, citing alleged Russian interference in 2016 U.S. election. “The recent meeting raises the suspicion of interference in the elections, which is not appropriate”, he said. According to the official Islamic Republic News Agency, Minnikhanov also met vice president Eshaq Jahangiri in Tehran one day earlier, discussing bilateral relations.

==== Other presidential duties ====
On 18 March 2022 Minnikhanov met and awarded 2022 European figure skating champion and provisional 2022 Olympic gold medallist Kamila Valieva a “Duslyk” order and to her mother Alsu Valieva a medal of “100 years of the Establishment of Tatar ASSR”.

== Corporate directorships ==
During his tenure as republican prime minister, Minnikhanov continued to be involved in industry, serving as chairman of the board of directors of the oil company Tatneft from 2005 to 2006.

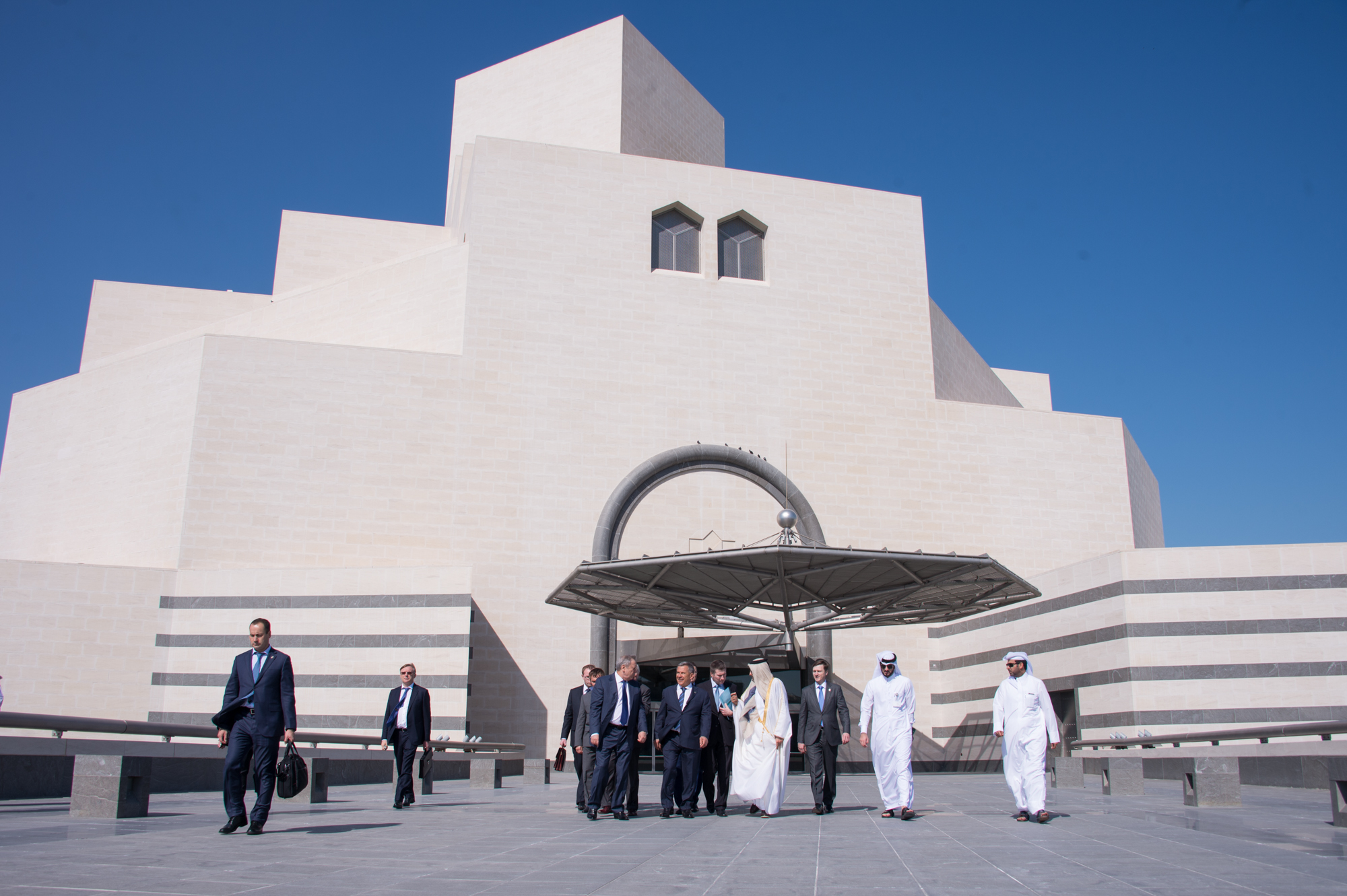
Minnikhanov in Doha, 2015

In September 2021 Minnikhanov while still President of Tatarstan was elected chairman of the board of directors of aircraft manufacturer Tupolev.

== Personal life ==
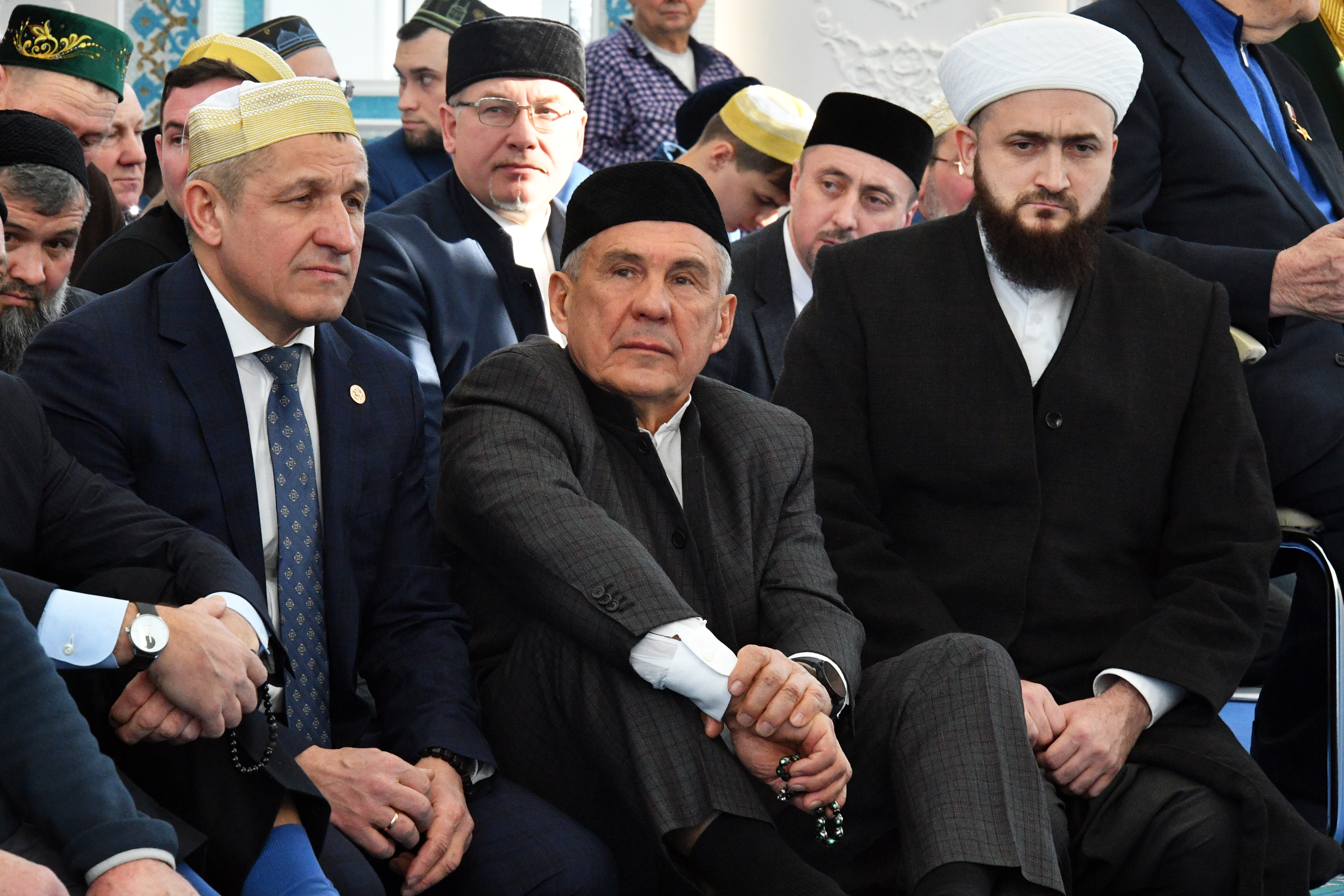
Minnikhanov sitting in the White Mosque in Tatarstan, 26 February 2024

Minnikhanov is married and fathered two sons. His son Irek Minnikhanov died in the Tatarstan Airlines Flight 363 crash on 17 November 2013.

Minnikhanov is a keen motorsports enthusiast and was a regular competitor in the FIA European Rallycross Championship, in 2007 driving a Citroën C4 T16 4x4 with 550+bhp that was built and raced in 2006 by 14-time European Rallycross champion Kenneth Hansen of Sweden. For the 2008 and 2009 ERX series Hansen's team built a brand new C4 for Minnikhanov. In 2002, 2003, 2004 and 2006 Minnikhanov won the truck category of the UAE Desert Challenge (a Rally Raid competition) in the United Arab Emirates with his Kamaz 4911 and in 2004 as well as 2005 he finished 3rd overall in the FIA European Championship for Autocross Drivers with a four-wheel-driven Ford Puma.

Minnikhanov is certified to fly a helicopter.

=== Sanctions ===
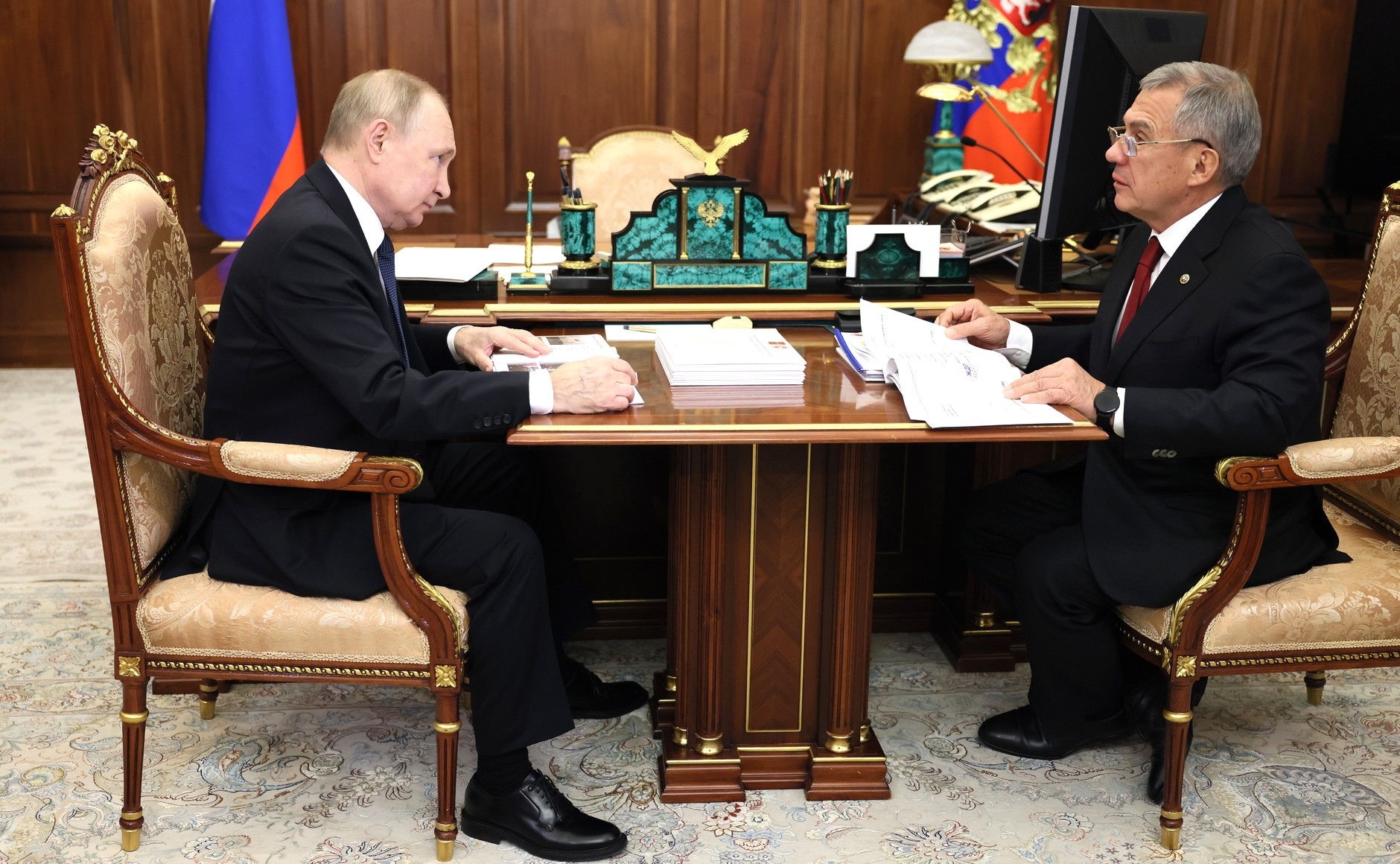
Minnikhanov with Russian President Vladimir Putin in the Kremlin in Moscow, 23 January 2023

In response to the Russian invasion of Ukraine, the Office of Foreign Assets Control of the United States Department of the Treasury added Minnikhanov to the Specially Designated Nationals and Blocked Persons List on 26 January 2023, which results in his assets being frozen and U.S. persons being prohibited from dealing with him. Canada sanctioned Minnikhanov, together with his wife in April 2023.

== Honors and awards ==
- Order of Merit for the Fatherland 4th class
- Order of Friendship
- Medal "In Commemoration of the 300th Anniversary of Saint Petersburg"
- Medal "In Commemoration of the 1000th Anniversary of Kazan"
- Medal "For Distinction in Eliminating the Effects of Emergency Situations" (EMERCOM)
- Order "For Merit to the Republic of Tatarstan"
- Order of Garaşsyzlyk (2021)
- Dostlug Order (2024)

== Notes ==
Political offices
Preceded by Mintimer Shaimiev	Prime Minister of Tatarstan; July 10, 1998 – March 25, 2010	Succeeded by Ildar Khalikov
Preceded by Mintimer Shaimiev	Head of Tatarstan; March 25, 2010–	Succeeded by Incumbent
