= Sergey Lebedev (politician) =

Uzbek-Russian politician (born 1948)

His Excellency Sergey Lebedev
- Сергей Лебедев
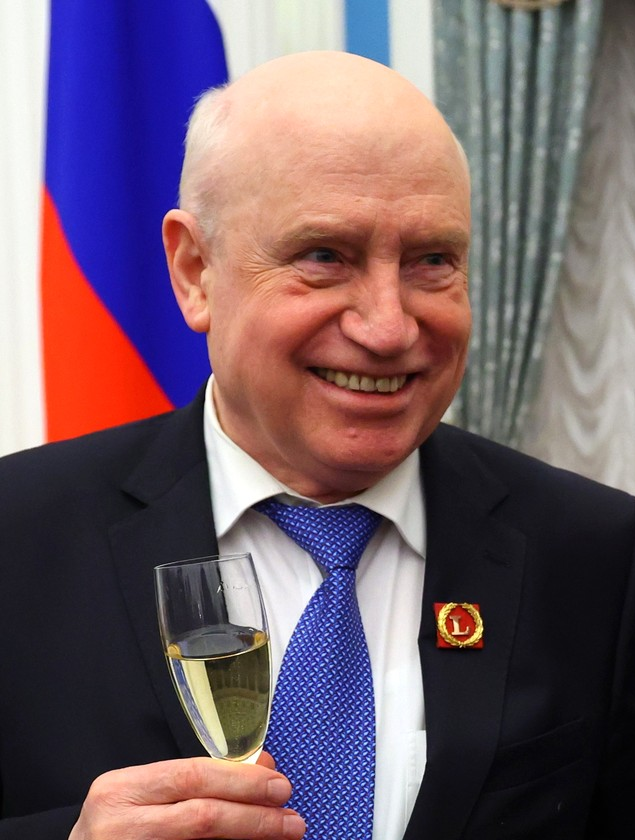
- Lebedev in 2023

General Secretary of the CIS
- Incumbent
- Assumed office 5 October 2007
- Preceded by: Vladimir Rushailo

Director of Foreign Intelligence Service
- In office 20 May 2000 – 5 October 2007
- President: Vladimir Putin
- Preceded by: Vyacheslav Trubnikov
- Succeeded by: Mikhail Fradkov

Personal details
- Born: Sergei Nikolaevich Lebedev; 9 April 1948 (age 78) Tashkent, Uzbek SSR, Soviet Union
- Party: Independent
- Education: Kyiv Polytechnic Institute; Diplomatic Academy of the Soviet Foreign Ministry
- Profession: Politician

Military service
- Allegiance: Soviet Union; Russia
- Branch/service: KGB; Foreign Intelligence Service
- Years of service: 1966–1997; 2000–2007
- Rank: General of the Army

Sergey Nikolayevich Lebedev (Russian: Сергей Николаевич Лебедев, IPA: [sʲɪrˈɡʲej nʲɪkɐˈlajɪvʲɪtɕ ˈlʲebʲɪdʲɪf]; born 9 April 1948) is a Russian politician who has been the General Secretary of the Commonwealth of Independent States (CIS) since 2007. He had previously been General of the Army in the Russian Armed Forces and Director of Russia's Foreign Intelligence Service (SVR) from 2000 to 2007.

== Early life and career ==
His father, Nikolai Ivanovich, was from Biysk, Siberia. He was a veteran of the Red Army and worked as a driver. His mother, Nina Yakovlevna, studied at the Leningrad Military Mechanical Institute and survived the Siege of Leningrad. After the war, she received a degree in finance and worked as an accountant. In 1965, he graduated from the Jizzakh Secondary School with a gold medal. A short time later was elected secretary of the Chernihiv City Committee of the Komsomol. Lebedev graduated in 1970 from the Chernihiv branch of Kyiv Polytechnic Institute. In 1971-1972 he did his military service in the Kiev Military District. He is a 1978 graduate (cum laude) of the Diplomatic Academy of the Soviet Foreign Ministry.

Before intelligence work, Lebedev served in the Army during 1966–72. He began his career in 1975 when he joined the KGB. He began duties in the First Chief Directorate (foreign intelligence) in 1975.

From 1998 to 2000, he was the official representative of the SVR in the United States, holding the rank of Lieutenant General.

== SVR Director (2000-2007) ==
Lebedev was appointed as Director of the SVR on 20 May 2000. According to news reports, he was appointed to the post because President Vladimir Putin wanted "an intelligence chief whom he knows well and has confidence in". Putin and Lebedev met while serving in East Germany.

== CIS General Secretary (2007–present) ==
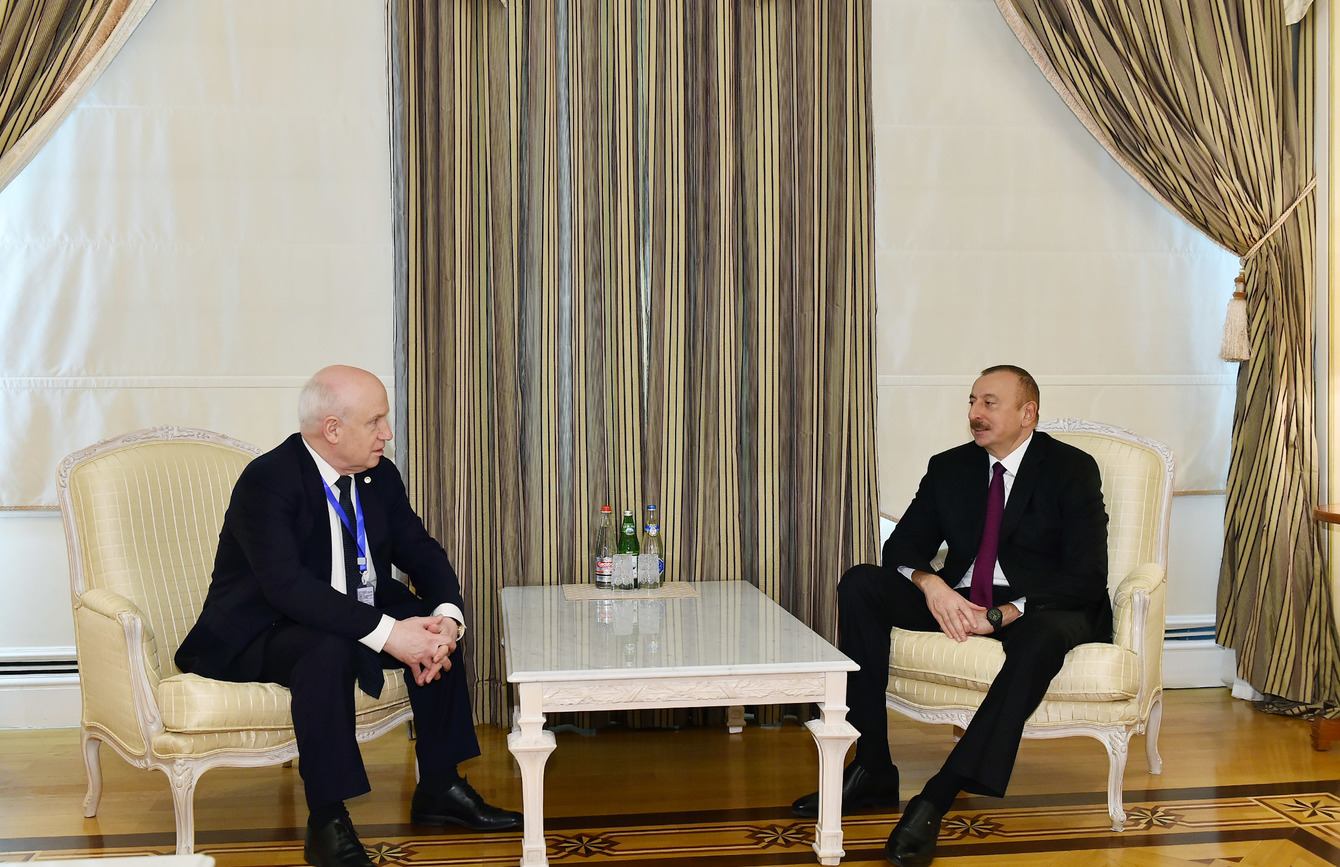
Lebedev with Ilham Aliyev.

On 5 October 2007, Lebedev was elected the Executive Secretary of the Commonwealth of Independent States and succeeded Vladimir Rushailo.

In 2019, his powers as Executive Secretary were extended for 3 years. From January 1, 2023, the name of the position of Executive Secretary of the CIS was changed to General Secretary of the CIS.

== Family ==
He is married to Vera Mikhailovna, is a chemical engineer. They have two adult sons and four grandchildren. Lebedev speaks German and English.

== Honors and awards ==
- Order "For Merit to the Fatherland" IV degree
- Order of Alexander Nevsky (22 April 2013)
- Medal "In Commemoration of the 850th Anniversary of Moscow" (1997)
- Two medals "For strengthening military cooperation"
- Medal "200 Years of the Ministry of Defense" (2002)
- Medal "200 years of the Ministry of Internal Affairs of Russia" (2002)
- Jubilee Medal "60 Years of the Armed Forces of the USSR" (1978)
- Jubilee Medal "70 Years of the Armed Forces of the USSR" (1988)
- Medal "For Impeccable Service", 1st degree
- Medal "For Impeccable Service" 2nd degree
- Medal "For Impeccable Service" 3rd degree
- Order of Merit, 3rd class (24 August 2013, Ukraine)
- Order of Friendship of Peoples (30 December 2002, Belarus)
- Order of Honor (29 March 2018, Belarus)
- Order of Stephen the Great (Moldova)
- Order of Danaker (11 April 2003, Kyrgyzstan)
- Order of Neutrality (11 October 2019, Turkmenistan)
- Order of Friendship (2 April 2018, Uzbekistan)
- Commemorative sign "20 Years of Independence of the Republic of Uzbekistan" (August 26, 2011, Uzbekistan)

* Medal "20 Years of Independence of the Republic of Kazakhstan" (2012)

- Badge of distinction "For services to the Moscow Region" (5 December 2005)
- Order of St. Sergius of Radonezh, 1st degree (12 July 2005, Russian Orthodox Church)
- Gratitude from the President of the Russian Federation (9 April 2008)
- Certificate of Honor of the Government of the Russian Federation (11 April 2008)
- Jubilee Medal "25 Years of Neutrality of Turkmenistan" (2020, Turkmenistan)
- Order of Dostyk, 1st class (13 April 2023, Kazakhstan)
- Badge of distinction "For Impeccable Service" L years (awarded 23 May 2023)
- International Prize of Saints Cyril and Methodius (2009)
- Medal "For Strengthening Parliamentary Cooperation" (11 April 2013, CIS Interparliamentary Assembly)
- Medal "IPA CIS. 25 years" (27 March 2017, Interparliamentary Assembly of the CIS)
- Medal "For Contribution to the Development of the Eurasian Economic Union" (29 May 2019, Supreme Council of the Eurasian Economic Union)
- Jubilee medal "80 years of the liberation of Belarus from the Nazi invaders" (2 July 2024)
- Commemorative sign of Turkmenistan "Magtymguly Pyragynyň 300 ýyllygyna" (11 October 2024, Turkmenistan)
- Order of Bitaraplyk (2019, Turkmenistan)

== Notes ==
Government offices
Preceded by Vyacheslav Trubnikov	Director of Foreign Intelligence Service (Russia); May 2000 – October 2007	Succeeded by Mikhail Fradkov
Preceded by Vladimir Rushailo	Executive Secretary of CIS from 5 October 2007	Succeeded by Incumbent
