= Aksoltan Ataýewa =

Turkmen diplomat and politician (born 1944)

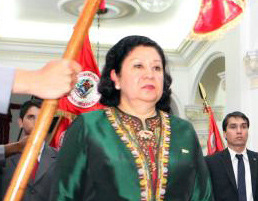
- Ataýewa in 2014

Permanent Representative of Turkmenistan to the United Nations
- Incumbent
- Assumed office January 1994
- President: Saparmyrat Nyýazow; Gurbanguly Berdimuhamedow

Ambassador of Turkmenistan to Cuba
- Incumbent
- Assumed office 30 July 2008
- President: Gurbanguly Berdimuhamedow

Ambassador to Brazil
- Incumbent
- Assumed office 31 July 2011
- President: Gurbanguly Berdimuhamedow

Ambassador to Venezuela
- Incumbent
- Assumed office 4 November 2013
- President: Gurbanguly Berdimuhamedow

Personal details
- Born: Aksoltan Töräýewna Ataýewa; 6 November 1944 (age 81) Ashkhabad, Turkmen SSR, Soviet Union
- Education: Turkmen State Medical University
- Awards: Hero of Turkmenistan (2019)

Aksoltan Töräýewna Ataýewa (born 6 November 1944) is a Turkmen politician who has served as the permanent representative of Turkmenistan to the United Nations since 23 February 1995. As of 2019, she is the most senior permanent representative from any nation currently serving, having held office for over 25 years. In 2019, she was named a Hero of Turkmenistan.

== Biography ==
In 1968, she graduated from the Turkmen State Medical Institute with the degree Candidate of Medical Sciences.

She served as Deputy Minister of Public Health from 1985 to 1991 and Minister of Public Health from 1991 to 1994; from 1994 to 1995, she was both Minister of Social Security and President of the Trade Unions of Turkmenistan. She joined the ruling Democratic Party in 1992 and became a member of the People's Council in 1993.

Since January 1994, she has served as the permanent representative of Turkmenistan to the United Nations.

In 2008, she was appointed concurrently Ambassador Extraordinary and Plenipotentiary of Turkmenistan to the Republic of Cuba. In 2011, she was appointed as well Ambassador Extraordinary and Plenipotentiary of Turkmenistan to the Federal Republic of Brazil, though she did not present her letter of credence to President Dilma Rousseff until 2015. In 2013, Ambassador Ataýewa was appointed Ambassador Extraordinary and Plenipotentiary of Turkmenistan to the Bolivarian Republic of Venezuela.

== Awards ==
- Order of Altyn Asyr III degree
- Jubilee Medal "20 years of Independence of Turkmenistan" (25 October 2011) — for a significant contribution to the development of Turkmenistan, given the many years of conscientious and dedicated work in the name of strengthening the sovereignty and independence of the country, active social and political activities, special services to the state and people, high professional skills and great labour achievements.
- Hero of Turkmenistan (26 September 2019) — for great personal contribution to strengthening sovereignty, constitutional order and state independence, the permanent neutrality of independent neutral Turkmenistan, outstanding services to Turkmen state and people, successes achieved, as well as many years of dedicated work.
