= Sharafutdinov =

Sharafutdinov is a Russian surname. Notable people with the surname include:

- Maxim Sharafutdinov (born 1980), Russian journalist and television presenter
- Dmitrii Sharafutdinov (born 1986), Russian rock climber
