= Altyn Ay Medal =

"Altyn Ay" Medal
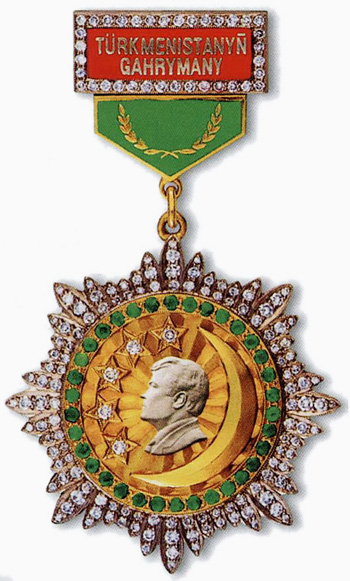
- Medal before 2014. After this date the image of Turkmenbashi was removed from medal.
- Type: Individual Award
- Presented by: President of Turkmenistan
- Eligibility: Turkmenistan citizens
- Status: Active

"Altyn Ay" Medal (Golden Moon) is a medal of Hero of Turkmenistan, a special decoration of a Hero of Turkmenistan.

== Description of the medal ==
=== 1992-2014 ===
The Altyn Ay medal has the shape of a circle inscribed in a regular octagonal star formed by the angles of two squares (small and large) displaced relative to each other. The star is made of white gold and consists of 48 rays, decorated with 124 diamonds of various sizes. The total diameter of the medal is 44 millimetres. In the center of the medal, made of 958 gold, against the background of 17 sun rays coming from the center, there is a relief profile of President Saparmurat Niyazov made of white gold.

=== Since 2014 ===
In 2014, a new version of the description of the medal was approved. The medal has the shape of a circle inscribed in a regular octagonal star formed by the angles of two squares displaced relative to each other. The star is made of gold and consists of 48 sun rays, decorated with 128 diamonds of various sizes. The total diameter of the medal is 60 millimetres. The medal is made of 750 standard gold.

== Awardees ==
- Gurbanguly Berdimuhamedov
- Maya Kuliyeva
- Oleg Kononenko
