= Andrey Sakharov (historian) =

Russian historian

- Андрей Сахаров
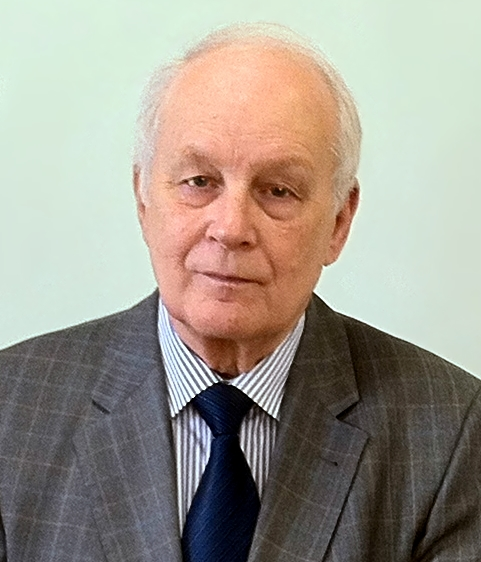
- Sakharov in 2014
- Born: Andrey Nikolayevich Sakharov; 2 June 1930; Kulebaki, Nizhny Novgorod Krai, Russian SFSR, Soviet Union
- Died: 26 June 2019 (aged 89); Moscow, Russia
- Spouse: Olga Sakharova
- Awards: Order of the Badge of Honour; Order of Friendship of Peoples; Order "For Merit to the Fatherland" (4th class); Jubilee Medal "In Commemoration of the 100th Anniversary of the Birth of Vladimir Ilyich Lenin"; Order of Merit of the Republic of Poland; Honoured Cultural Worker of the RSFSR; Russian Federation Presidential Certificate of Honour

Academic background
- Education: Moscow State University (Specialist, Candidate of Sciences, Doctor of Sciences)
- Thesis: The Origins of Diplomacy in Ancient Rus’ (9th – First Half of the 10th Century) (1982)
- Doctoral advisor: Lev Cherepnin

Academic work
- Discipline: History, historiography
- Institutions: MSU Faculty of History; Russian Academy of Sciences
- Main interests: History of Russia, diplomatic history
- Notable ideas: Anti-Normanism

Andrey Nikolayevich Sakharov (Russian: Андрей Николаевич Сахаров; 2 June 1930, – 26 June 2019) was an anti-Normanist Russian historian.

== Career ==
Sakharov was born in Kulebaki. In 1993, he was appointed Director of the Russian History Institute, affiliated with the Academy of Sciences. He initiated a campaign to purge the institute of his Normanist opponents. It came under much criticism, forcing Sakharov into retirement in 2010.

Sakharov was an active member of the Presidential Commission of the Russian Federation to Counter Attempts to Falsify History to the Detriment of Russia's Interests that existed between 2009 and 2012.

== Works ==
His major monographs include The Diplomacy of Ancient Rus (1980) and its sequel, The Diplomacy of Svyatoslav (1982). For his studies of early medieval diplomacy Sakharov was elected a corresponding member of the Russian Academy of Sciences (1991).
