= Sergey Naryshkin =

Russian director of the Foreign Intelligence Service (born 1954)

- Сергей Нарышкин
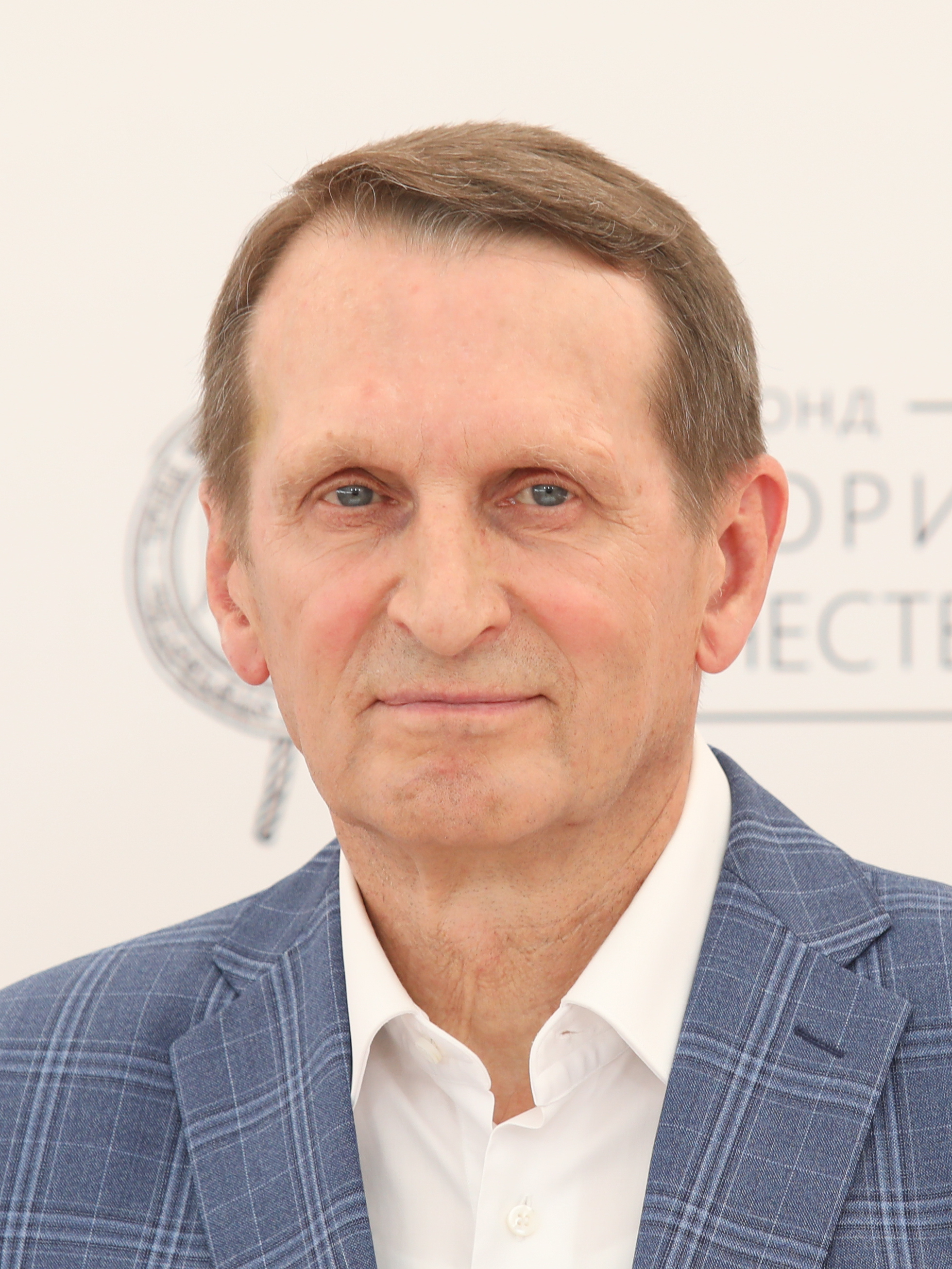
- Naryshkin in 2024

Director of the Foreign Intelligence Service
- Incumbent
- Assumed office 5 October 2016
- President: Vladimir Putin
- Preceded by: Mikhail Fradkov

Chairman of the State Duma
- In office 21 December 2011 – 5 October 2016
- Preceded by: Boris Gryzlov
- Succeeded by: Vyacheslav Volodin

Member of the State Duma (Party List Seat)
- In office 4 December 2011 – 5 October 2016

Kremlin Chief of Staff
- In office 12 May 2008 – 20 December 2011
- President: Dmitry Medvedev
- Preceded by: Sergey Sobyanin
- Succeeded by: Sergei Ivanov

Deputy Prime Minister of Russia — Head of the Government Executive Office
- In office 13 September 2004 – 12 May 2008
- Prime Minister: Mikhail Fradkov; Viktor Zubkov; Vladimir Putin
- Preceded by: Dmitry Kozak
- Succeeded by: Sergey Sobyanin

Personal details
- Born: 27 October 1954 (age 72) Leningrad, Russian SFSR, Soviet Union
- Party: United Russia
- Spouse: Tatiana Yakubchik
- Children: 2
- Education: Leningrad Mechanical Institute; Higher School of the KGB; International Management Institute of Saint Petersburg
- Website: Sergey Naryshkin
- Sergey Naryshkin's voice Recorded 1 October 2012

Sergey Yevgenyevich Naryshkin (Russian: Серге́й Евге́ньевич Нары́шкин, IPA: [sʲɪrˈɡʲej jɪˈvɡʲenʲjɪvʲɪtɕ nɐˈrɨʂkʲɪn]; born 27 October 1954) is a Russian politician who has served as the director of the Foreign Intelligence Service since 2016. Previously, he was Chairman of the State Duma (2011–2016) and Kremlin Chief of Staff (2008–2012); he was also chairman of the Historical Truth Commission from May 2009 until it was dissolved in February 2012. Naryshkin has the federal state civilian service rank of 1st class Active State Councillor of the Russian Federation.

== Early life and education ==
Sergei Yevgenyevich Naryshkin was born in Leningrad and graduated from the Leningrad Institute of Mechanics with a degree in engineering in 1978. As a student, he served as the first secretary of the institute's Komsomol chapter. Afterwards, Naryshkin studied at the Moscow Higher School of the KGB (Russian: Высшая школа КГБ) for two years in the French section while Nikolay Tokarev also studied at the Higher School of the KGB at the same time. In the 1990s he also graduated from International Management Institute of Saint Petersburg with a degree in economics.

In 2015, Naryshkin's dissertation in economics was exposed as fraudulent in an investigation by Dissernet, with more than half of the text plagiarized from other publications.

== Career ==
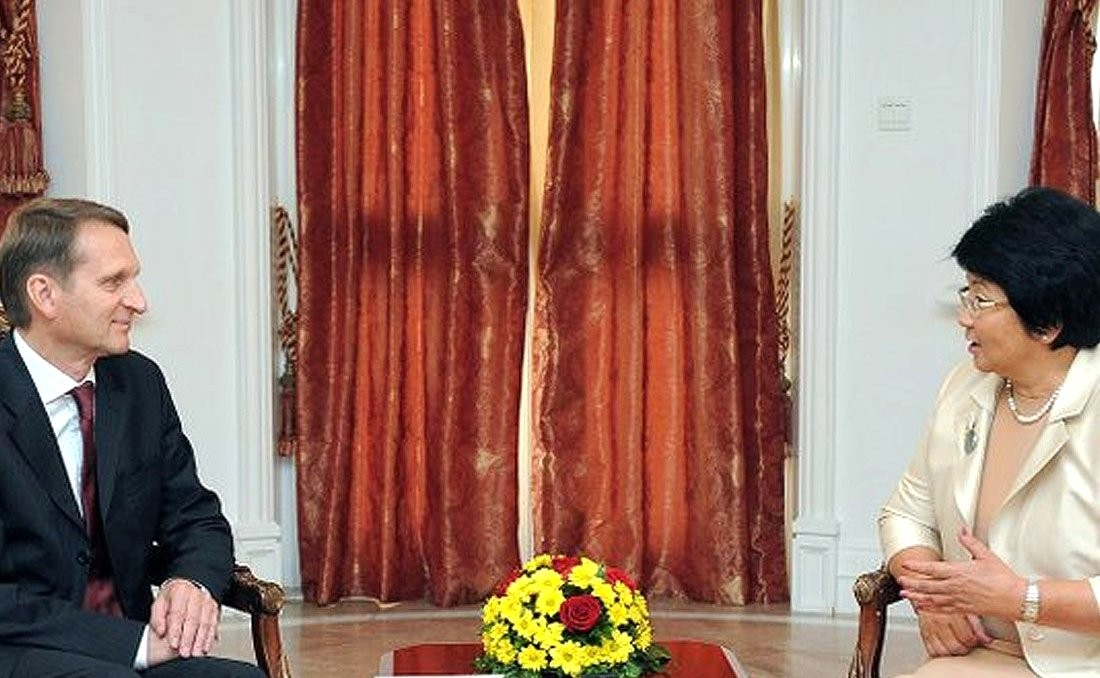
Naryshkin meeting with Kyrgyz President Roza Otunbayeva during his working visit to Bishkek in August 2011.

In 1982, Naryshkin was appointed Deputy Vice-Rector of the Leningrad Polytechnical Institute. From 1988 to 1992, he worked in the Soviet Embassy in Brussels as an expert in the State Committee on Science and Technologies in the office of the economic adviser, but Alexei Pastyukhov, a childhood friend, stated that Naryshkin worked as third secretary. Some sources suggest that while there he began to work for the KGB after he had been at a group of the KGB Higher School where he and Vladimir Putin were fellow students.

=== Municipal and Oblast political staffer (1992–2004) ===
From 1992 until 1995, he worked in the Committee for Economy and Finance of the Saint Petersburg Mayor Office. After leaving, he became the chief of the external investment department of Promstroybank, a position he would hold until 1997. From 1997 until 1998, Naryshkin led the Investment Department of the Leningrad Oblast government. From 1998 until 2004, he was the Chairman of the Committee for External Economic and International Relations of the government of Leningrad Oblast.

=== Deputy Prime Minister (External affairs) and siloviki (2004–2008) ===
In early 2004, he was a deputy head of the economic department of the Russian presidential administration. From March through September 2004, Naryshkin was a deputy chief of staff of the Russian government.

Since 2004, he has been a member of the board of directors of Sovkomflot and a deputy chairman of the board of directors of Rosneft. Since 31 August 2004, Naryshkin has also been chairman of the Board of Directors of the state-owned television channel Channel One.

Since 13 September 2004, he has been a Minister, Chief of Staff of the Government of Russia. On 15 February 2007, President Vladimir Putin announced that Naryshkin had been appointed Deputy Prime Minister of Russia for external economic activity, focusing on collaboration with the Commonwealth of Independent States.

=== Presidential Chieftain (2008–2011) ===
In May 2008, Naryshkin was appointed chief of the Presidential Administration of Russia.

In May 2009, President Dmitry Medvedev appointed him chairman of the Historical Truth Commission, which was active until February 2012.

=== Chairman of the State Duma (2011–2016) ===
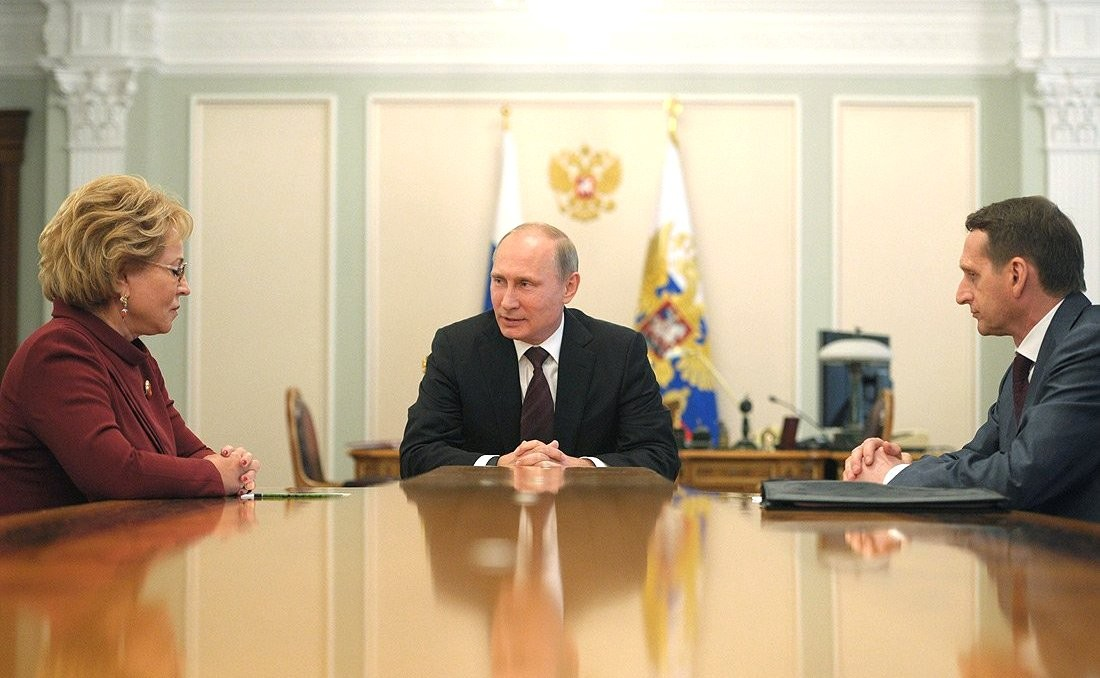
President Putin with Chairwoman of the Federation Council Matviyenko and Naryshkin, 2 September 2013

Naryshkin was elected to the State Duma, the lower house of the Russian parliament in December 2011. When the Duma began meeting for its new term on 21 December 2011, Naryshkin was elected as Chairman of the State Duma; he received 238 votes in favor of his candidacy, while 88 deputies opposed him.

In June 2012, Naryshkin signed a resolution on setting up a culture council under the State Duma speaker. The council is “a standing advisory body”. The tasks of the council are “the examination and drafting of initiatives on topical problems of legislative regulations in culture and associated industries, the development of recommendations on culture for the use in lawmaking”.

On 2 September 2013, Naryshkin stated that there are no political prisoners in today's Russia.

Since the rise of tensions between the European Union and Russia in 2014, Naryshkin was perceived as one of the main coordinators of contacts with European far-right and far-left parties supporting Russian foreign policy in Europe.

=== Sanctions ===
As a result of the annexation of Crimea by the Russian Federation, the federal government of the United States under Barack Obama blacklisted (Note: He was placed on the Specially Designated Nationals List (SDN), a list of individuals sanctioned as “members of the Russian leadership’s inner circle.”) Naryshkin and other close friends of the Russian president, including Sergei Ivanov and Gennadi Timchenko. Nevertheless, he officially visited the U.S., along with other Russian top security chiefs, at the end of January 2018.

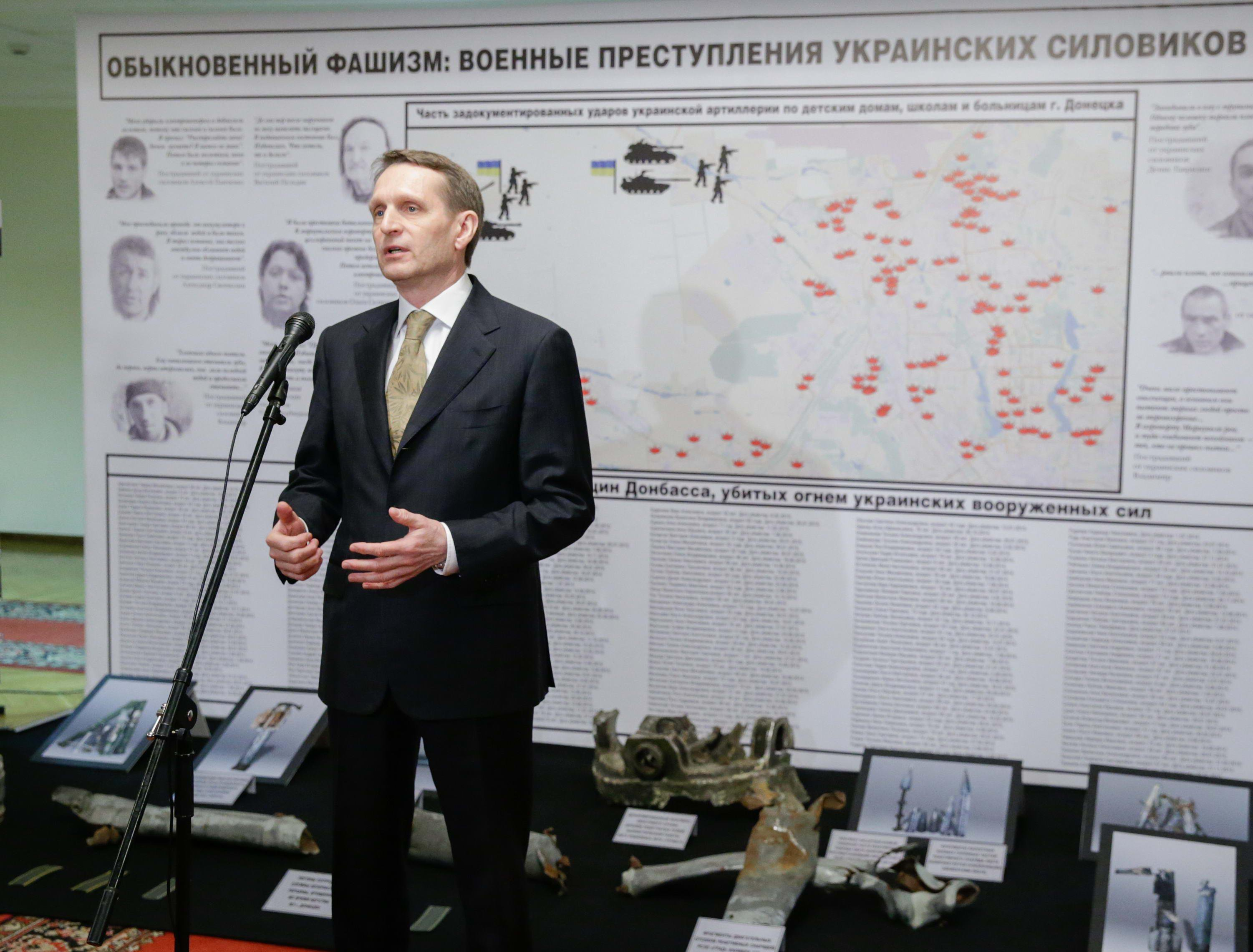
Opening of the exhibition "Ordinary fascism – war crimes of Ukrainian security forces", 28 March 2016

He was sanctioned by the UK government in 2014 in relation to the Russo-Ukrainian War.

His son, Andrey Naryshkin, had EU residence in Hungary, a registered address in Budapest and actively appealed the decision against its revocation in 2022. Naryshkin's other relatives also frequently travelled across Europe between 2018 and 2021.

=== Chief of Foreign Intelligence Service (2016) ===
In September 2016, Naryshkin was appointed chief of Russia's Foreign Intelligence Service (SVR).

==== 2022 Russo-Ukrainian War ====
In November 2021, Naryshkin dismissed reports of a possible invasion of Ukraine asserting that it was "malicious propaganda by the US State Department".

Days before Russia invaded Ukraine in February 2022, Naryshkin received widespread attention in the global press for visibly trembling and "stutter[ing] uncomfortably" as Putin humiliated him publicly for "fumbling" his response to the Russian President's questioning during a Security Council of Russia meeting concerning the abandonment of the Minsk agreements and recognizing the Russian-backed separatist regions of Donetsk and Luhansk.

On 6 April 2022, in response to the 2022 Russian invasion of Ukraine, the Office of Foreign Assets Control of the United States Department of the Treasury added Naryshkin to its list of persons sanctioned pursuant to Executive Order 14024.

On 15 August 2023, Naryshkin gave a speech at a security conference in Moscow, where he argued that for "a spiritually and physically healthy person, it’s unpleasant and sometimes even scary to travel to Europe–so many perversions of various kinds have thrived there".

== Membership in advisory and scientific councils and commissions ==
Naryshkin is the chairman of the Board of Trustees of the Russian Presidential Academy of National Economy and Public Administration (RANEPA).

== Awards and honors ==
Russia

- Order of Merit to the Fatherland, 3rd class (2010)
- Order of Merit to the Fatherland, 4th class (4 June 2008)
- Order of Alexander Nevsky (27 October 2014)
- Order of Honour (27 October 2004)
- Order of Friendship (2016)
- Medal of the Order "For Merit to the Fatherland", 2nd class (11 March 2003)
- Russian Federation Presidential Certificate of Honour (26 October 2009)
- Honorary Diploma of the Government of the Russian Federation (26 October 2009)
- Certificate of Honor of the Central Election Commission of the Russian Federation (2 April 2008)
- Order of St. Sergius of Radonezh, 2nd class (2014)
- Medal "In Memory of the 350th Anniversary of Irkutsk" (2011)
- Medal "For Contribution to Strengthening the Defense of the Russian Federation" (2021)
- Order of Saint Anna, 1st class (2009)

Foreign countries

- Order of Honor (2015, Armenia)
- Dostlug Order (2012, Azerbaijan)
- Order of Honor (2015, Belarus)
- Order of the Friendship of Peoples (2009, Belarus)
- Officer of the Legion of Honour (2013, France)
- Order of Friendship, 2nd class (2016, Kazakhstan)
- Order of Neutrality of the President of Turkmenistan (2012, Turkmenistan)
- Friendship Order (2021, Vietnam)

== Notes ==
Political offices
Preceded by Boris Gryzlov	Chairman of the State Duma; 2011-2016	Succeeded by Vyacheslav Volodin
Government offices
Preceded by Mikhail Fradkov	Director of Foreign Intelligence Service; 2016 – present	Succeeded by Incumbent
