= Sergei Markov =

Russian political scientist and journalist (born 1958)

- Сергей Марков
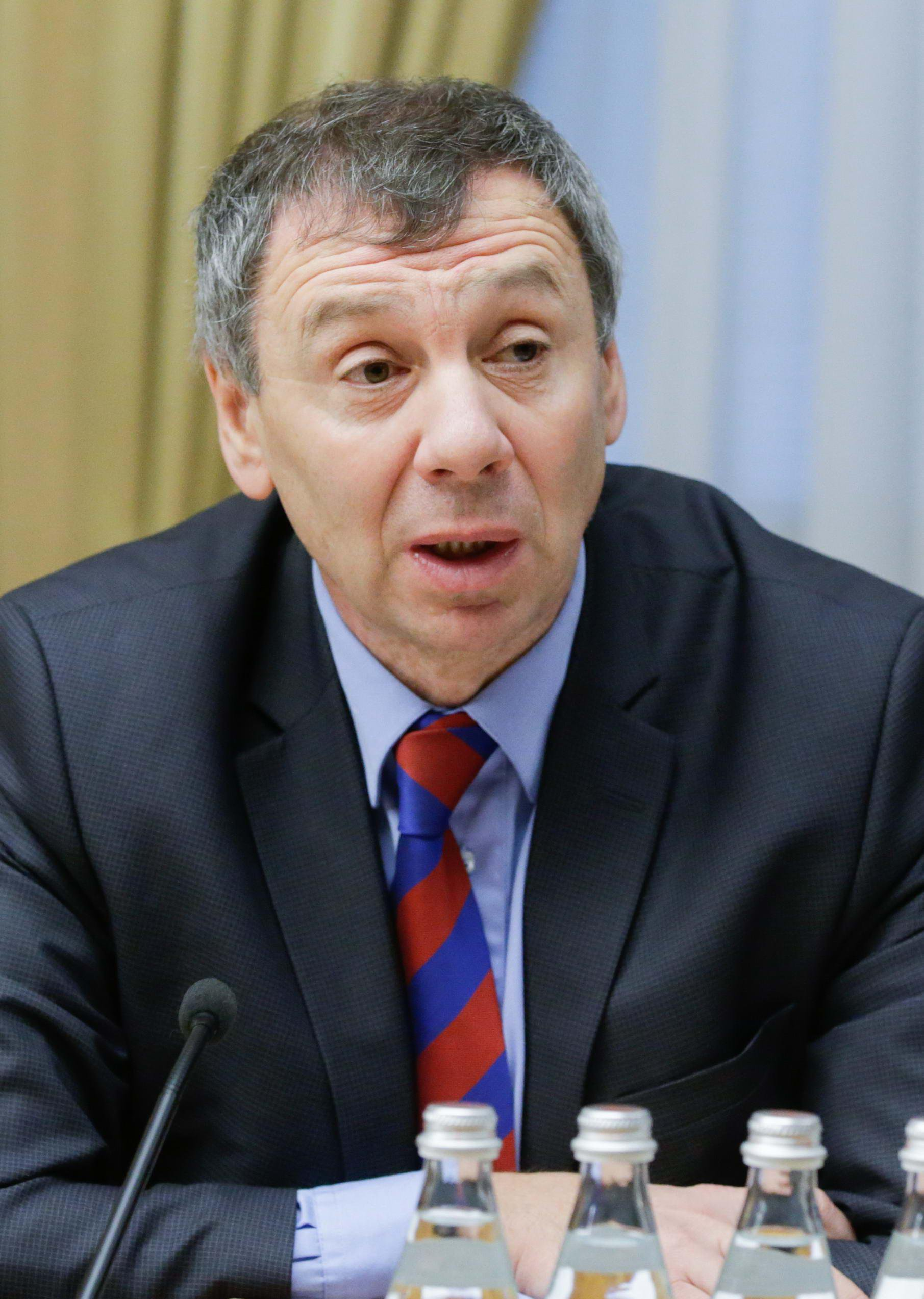
- Markov in 2015
- Born: 18 April 1958 (age 68); Dubna, Moscow Oblast, Russian SFSR, Soviet Union
- Education: Faculty of Philosophy, Moscow State University
- Alma mater: Moscow State University
- Occupations: Political scientist, politician, opinion journalist
- Sergei Markov's voice Recorded 28 July 2013

Sergei Alexandrovich Markov (Russian: Серге́й Александрович Марков; born 18 April 1958) is a Russian political scientist, journalist, former close advisor and supporter of the Russian President Vladimir Putin. He is a Candidate of Political Science, associate professor of Public Policy department of Faculty of Philosophy at Moscow State University, professor of the Faculty of Political Science at the Moscow State Institute of International Relations (MGIMO-University), director of the Institute of Political Studies. He was also a member of the Presidential Commission of the Russian Federation to Counter Attempts to Falsify History to the Detriment of Russia's Interests, which existed between 2009 and 2012.

== Career ==
=== Political roles (2006–2012) ===
From 2006 to 2008 he was a member of the Public Chamber of Russia.

In the December 2007 Russian legislative election he was elected to the State Duma, representing United Russia.

Markov sat in the Parliamentary Assembly of the Council of Europe from 14 April 2008 until 23 January 2012. In July 2008 he participated in an international relations forum entitled "The State of Democracy in the World and the Western Efforts to Promote It: Why Has Progress Stopped?"

Markov denies Russian involvement in the November 2006 poisoning of Alexander Litvinenko, with Polonium-210. The Polonium-210 came from a Russian reactor, and the British security services believe the poisoning have been conducted on behalf of the Russian government. He also attributes the Russian apartment bombings by Chechen terrorists to Russian businessmen forced from the country to exile in Britain. Markov comments on many other foreign-policy questions, attributing the conflict in South Ossetia to a plot by Dick Cheney to further the interests of John McCain against Barack Obama in the US presidential elections.

In 2007, having been accused of being behind cyberattacks on Estonian government's systems, Markov was declared persona non grata in Estonia and in 2008 he was also expelled from Ukraine.

In late 2009, Markov said that he believes the Russian Black Sea Fleet should stay stationed in Ukraine "for the next 100 years" because he believes "It is the guarantor of security in the entire region."

=== Posterior academic life ===
Markov seems not to have been re-elected in the 2011 Russian legislative election. Instead he returned to the ivory tower, as associate professor of Public Policy department of Faculty of Philosophy at Moscow State University, and professor of the Faculty of Political Science at the Moscow State Institute of International Relations (aka MGIMO), director of the Institute of Political Studies.

=== Commentary ===
==== On the post-Soviet space ====
Markov has criticized historians from states formerly under Soviet occupation, claiming they distort the historical record with the documentation of events like the Katyn massacre. In early May 2010, Markov demanded a "radical" change in Ukrainian textbooks about the history of Ukraine. He stated Ukrainian history textbooks can not be considered an internal affair of Ukraine, as they often displayed a negative attitude to Russia. On 13 May 2010, education minister of Ukraine Dmytro Tabachnyk announced that Ukraine and Russia intend to develop a common textbook for history teachers.

==== On the Russian invasion of Ukraine ====
Prior to the Russian invasion of Ukraine in February 2022, Markov said that "It will not be a war against Ukraine, but to liberate Ukraine" from the pro-Western government that took power in 2014, adding that "a military operation now would prevent a wider war in future." In March 2022, Markov argued that the Russian invasion of Ukraine was not a "war between Russia and Ukraine, it’s a war between Russia and (the) United States puppet who now occupy Ukraine. It’s liberation of Ukraine and it’s a proxy war of United States against Russia. We believe there’s no independent Ukrainian government and this government is wholly under the control of the United States security community." Markov later admitted that the war in Ukraine was more difficult "than had been expected. It was expected that 30 to 50 percent of the Ukrainian Armed Forces would switch over to Russia’s side. No one is switching over." On Russia's disastrous performance in the war, Markov said "So far the results have been appalling because Russia wasn’t at all ready".

On 25 June 2024 Markov was still complaining about the "terroristic, Neo-Nazi" régime of Ukraine. He said that Russia was in the midst of a "humanitarian intervention".

In August 2024, Ukrainian forces crossed the border into Kursk Oblast during the ongoing Russian invasion of Ukraine resulting in part of the oblast becoming under Ukrainian occupation. Markov told The Washington Post that "the signal came from intelligence to the leadership, but ... measures were not taken. This is a failure of the entire system of intelligence, and since Putin is responsible for this, then it's clear this is a blow to Putin." Speculating on Ukraine's motive for invading the Kursk Oblast, Markov said that "Putin has said many times that any peace agreement should take into account the facts on the ground and that Russia will not leave the territory it has taken" and Ukraine is trying "to break this formula and gain Russian territory to exchange."

==== On the Wagner rebellion ====
In late August 2023, after the Wagner rebellion ended limply and Yevgeny Prigozhin was killed in uncertain circumstances, Markov went on UK radio and said that to doubt the sincerity of Putin's condolences was in poor taste.

==== Russophobia and World War III ====
In an interview with Svenska Dagbladet, released 8 June 2014, Markov said that if Russia felt "backed into a corner" by Sweden and Finland joining NATO, combined with what he perceived as "Russophobia" from certain European countries, it could start World War III.

In an interview with BBC Radio Four on 21 September 2022, Markov speculated that Russia would use nuclear weapons 'against the UK'.

Sometime after the 2022 Russian invasion of Ukraine, Markov's opinion was that World War Three had already started.

==== On Pussy Riot ====
Markov has supported the prosecution and conviction of three members of Pussy Riot, a group which he sees as part of a foreign conspiracy against Russia. In August 2012, he wrote in an editorial that: "Pussy Riot's act inside the Cathedral of Christ the Saviour is not the stupidity of young girls, but part of the global conspiracy against Russia and the Russian Orthodox Church. ... According to this version [of events], Putin isn't obliged to just punish three idiots in a fatherly way, but also protect Russia from this conspiracy with all possible severity."

==== Gay rights in Russia ====
In an interview with Jason Jones aired in February 2014, Markov stated:

There is real personal freedom in Russia. Nobody cares with whom you want to have sex. For example, you are absolutely free to make sex [sic] with this table. ... You can many times repeat to me that "it's normal" or "it's absolutely freedom" [sic], that "it's democracy", that "it's human right" [sic] for you to make sex with this table. ... Having sex between man and woman: normal. Having sex between man and man: not normal. Everybody knows this. Including gays.

==== On Donald Trump ====
In November 2016, following the election of Donald Trump in the United States, Markov dismissed alleged Russian interference in the presidential election, though he said "maybe we helped a bit with WikiLeaks." In 2020, Markov said that "All the hopes [Trump] raised in Russians were dashed. More sanctions, more tensions, less arms control, and almost no diplomatic dialogue is what we have today. But no one in Moscow has any hopes about Biden either."

==== Ethnic minorities in Russian Federation ====
Markov claimed in Aleksandr Dugin's newspaper Eurasia Daily that there is "a huge ethnic bias" within the State TV's presenter Vladimir Solovyov's propaganda media pool. Markov criticized that two ethnic minorities, Jews and Armenians, have had been too influential when discussing about the position of "Great Russia" towards Israel and Armenia. He implied that ethnic minorities could not be fully loyal to the regime and thus to Russia itself.

Mainly the representatives of [these] two great diasporas are discussing what the policies of Great Russia should be. This is laughable and improper... This isn’t normal. There will be more scandals, because Russia’s relations with Israel and Armenia are getting worse. Many of Solovyov’s experts can’t find balance between Russia and their ethnic identity.”
