= Mikhail Fradkov =

Prime Minister of Russia from 2004 to 2007

- Михаил Фрадков
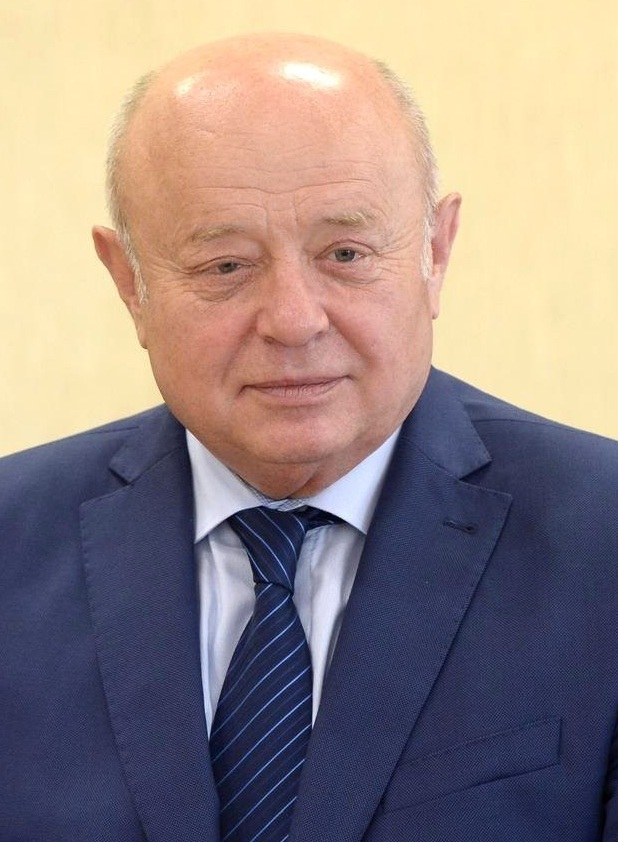
- Fradkov in 2016

Director of the Russian Institute for Strategic Studies
- Incumbent
- Assumed office 4 January 2017
- Preceded by: Leonid Reshetnikov

Director of the Foreign Intelligence Service
- In office 6 October 2007 – 5 October 2016
- President: Vladimir Putin; Dimitry Medvedev; Vladimir Putin
- Preceded by: Sergei Lebedev
- Succeeded by: Sergey Naryshkin

Prime Minister of Russia
- In office 5 March 2004 – 14 September 2007
- President: Vladimir Putin
- Preceded by: Mikhail Kasyanov
- Succeeded by: Viktor Zubkov

Chairman of the Council of Ministers of the Union State
- In office 11 March 2004 – 15 October 2007
- Preceded by: Mikhail Kasyanov
- Succeeded by: Viktor Zubkov

Personal details
- Born: Mikhail Yefimovich Fradkov; 1 September 1950 (age 76) Kuybyshev, Russian SFSR, Soviet Union
- Citizenship: Russia
- Party: CPSU (until 1991); Fatherland – All Russia (1998—2002); United Russia (from 2004)
- Spouse: Elena Ludenko-Fradkova
- Children: Petr, Pavel
- Education: STANKIN
- Awards: Order of Honour

Mikhail Yefimovich Fradkov (Note: In this name that follows East Slavic naming customs, the patronymic is Yefimovich and the family name is Fradkov.) (Russian: Михаи́л Ефи́мович Фрадко́в, IPA: [mʲɪxɐˈil jɪˈfʲiməvʲɪtɕ frɐtˈkof]; born 1 September 1950) is a Russian politician who served as Prime Minister of Russia from 2004 to 2007. An independent, he was the longest serving director of Russia's Foreign Intelligence Service from 2007 to 2016. Since 4 January 2017, Fradkov has been Director of the Russian Institute for Strategic Studies.

The cabinet of Fradkov was the first government in the history of Russia that voluntarily resigned in accordance with part 1 of Article 117 of the constitution.

He has the federal state civilian service rank of 1st class Active State Councillor of the Russian Federation.

== Early life ==
Fradkov was born near Samara to a family of Jewish origin on his father's side. He studied at both the Moscow Machine Tool Design (станкоинструментальный) Institute (graduated 1972) and the Foreign Trade Academy (graduated 1981). In 1973, he was posted to the economic section of the Soviet Union's embassy in India, where he remained for two years. He later held several positions back in Russia. In 1991, he was Russia's representative to General Agreement on Tariffs and Trade (GATT) in Geneva.

== Early political career ==
In late 1992, Fradkov was appointed Deputy Minister for Foreign Economic Relations. Less than a year later, in October 1993, he became First Deputy Minister for Foreign Economic Relations. On 15 April 1997, a presidential decree by Boris Yeltsin appointed Fradkov Minister of Foreign Economic Relations and Trade, a post which he kept for nearly a year. In the middle of 1999, another presidential decree made him Minister of Trade. He was made director of the Federal Tax Police by Vladimir Putin in 2001, having previously been Deputy Secretary of the Security Council. In 2003 he was made Russia's representative to the European Union. On 1 March 2004, he was nominated by Putin as the next prime minister, and this appointment was approved by the Duma on 5 March.

Fradkov's nomination as prime minister was a surprise to many observers, as he was not seen as part of Vladimir Putin's inner circle. Some commentators, such as the Carnegie Moscow Center's Lilia Shevtsova, have speculated that his "outsider" status might have been an important factor in his nomination, saying that Putin selected him as someone who was "not a representative of any of the warring clans" in the Kremlin. Former Prime Minister Sergei Stepashin, whom Fradkov has served under, called Fradkov "absolutely independent from any sort of political clan or group." Putin and his allies praised Fradkov as experienced, professional, and honest.

== Chairman of the Government of the Russian Federation (2004–2007) ==
=== Appointment ===
Replacing his predecessor Mikhail Kasyanov in March 2004, Fradkov took over as Chairman of the Government of the Russian Federation.

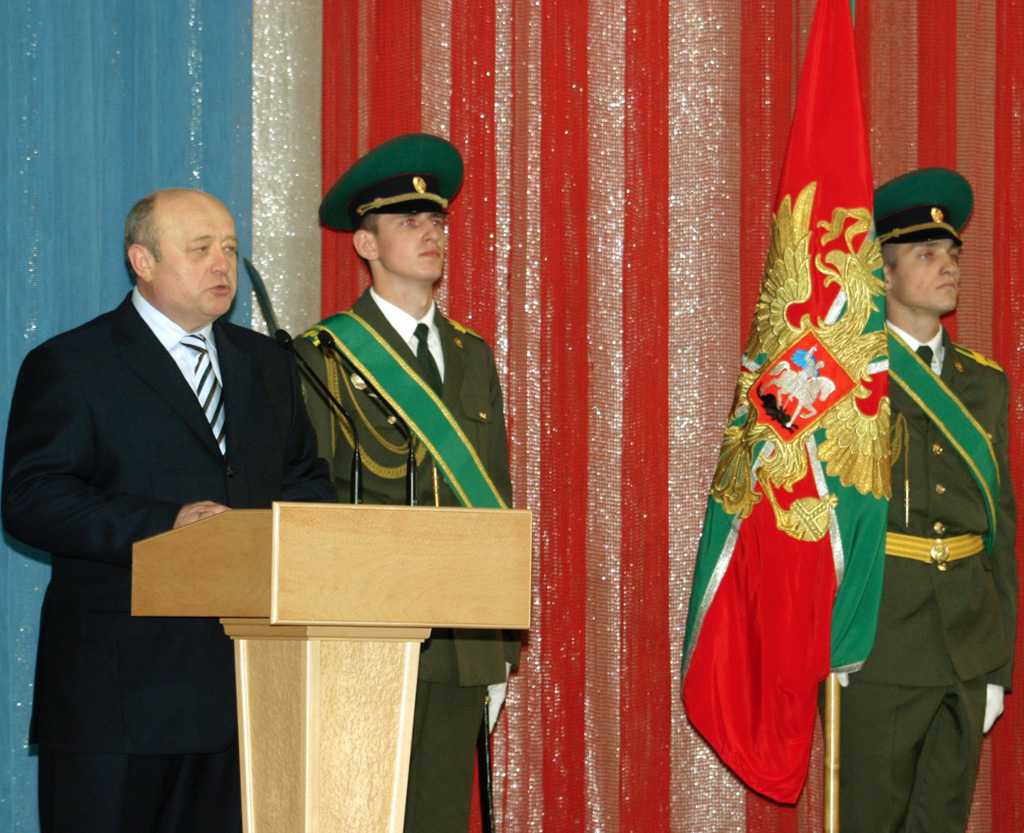
Prime Minister of the Russian Federation Mikhail Fradkov. 28 May 2004

In early March 2004, the State Duma overwhelmingly agreed to the appointment of Mikhail Fradkov as Chairman of the Government: he was supported by the United Russia and LDPR factions, as well as some of the deputies from the Motherland, and opposed by the Communist Party faction. Of the non-parliamentary parties, Fradkov's candidacy was supported by the Union of Right Forces, noting his experience in the government in various areas and international authority, thanks to his work as Russian Plenipotentiary Envoy to the European Union.

On 12 May 2004, Fradkov was appointed prime minister for the second time, as Vladimir Putin had won the presidential election and been inaugurated on 7 May (see also Mikhail Fradkov's Second Cabinet).

=== Overview of premeirship ===
According to many analysts, he was the so-called "technical prime minister" who did not pursue an independent policy. All key decisions were made by the Administration of the President of the Russian Federation, said Alexei Makarkin, deputy general director of the Center for Political Technologies.

The following steps marked the activities of the Fradkov government:

- administrative reform (reorganization of government departments) (2004);
- "Monetization of social benefits" - the replacement of in-kind social benefits with monetary compensation, caused protests in early 2005 (2004);
- Start of implementation of the project "affordable and comfortable housing for the citizens of Russia";
- Start of implementation of the National Project "Health";
- Start of implementation of the National Project "Education";
- Commencement of the housing and communal services reform aimed at attracting businesses to the housing and communal services sector, housing construction development, and mortgages. As a result, at the time of the resignation of the government, about 15% of Russians could afford a mortgage, commercial structures did not actively work in the housing and communal services sector;
- EGAIS (Unified State Automated Information System, N 102-FZ dated 21 July 2005) was implemented to automate state control over the production volume and turnover of ethyl alcohol and alcoholic and alcohol-containing products. The introduction was accompanied by technical problems that caused an alcohol crisis in the first half of 2006.

On 14 November 2005, Vladimir Putin introduced two new positions in the government, further curtailing the prime minister's powers. Head of the Presidential Administration of the Russian Federation Dmitry Medvedev became the first deputy chairman in charge of the implementation of the so-called National Priority Projects, and the Minister of Defense of the Russian Federation Sergei Ivanov became the deputy chairman in charge of defense and the military-industrial complex.

In 2006, Fradkov received an income of 2.59 million rubles, which increased from 2005 (1.8 million) by 44%.

=== Resignation ===
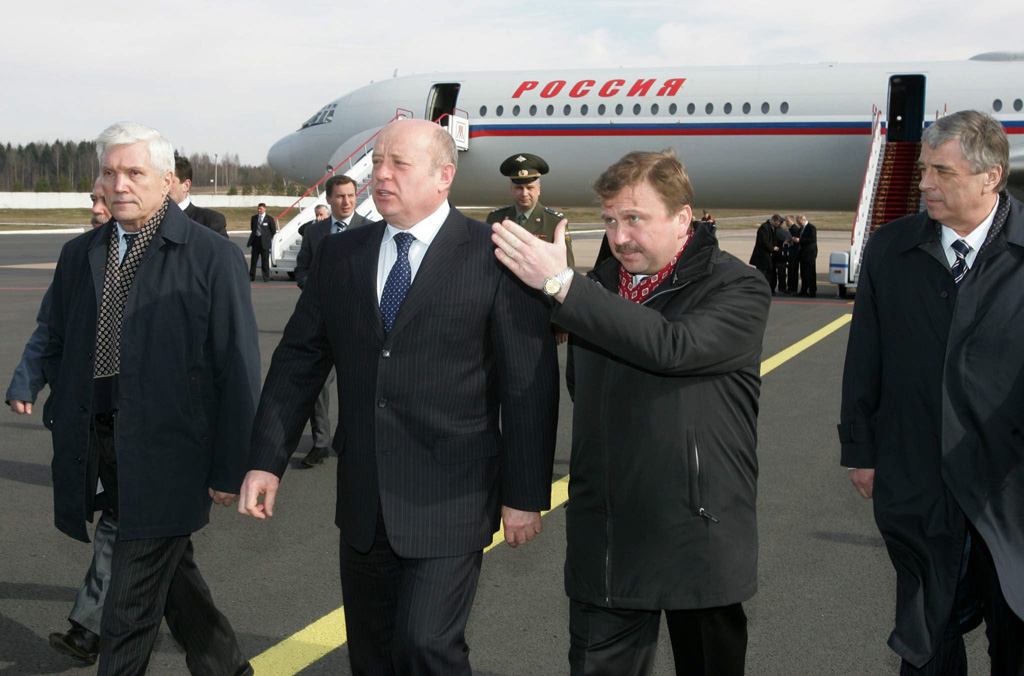
Mikhail Fradkov during a visit to Belarus, 2007

On 12 September 2007, at a meeting with the President of the Russian Federation, Fradkov was asked to resign the government, motivating it as follows:

Understanding the ongoing political processes today, I would like you to have complete freedom in choosing decisions, including personnel. And, I think that it would be right, on my part, to come up with the initiative to vacate the post of Prime Minister so that you have no restrictions in decision-making and arranging, here, the power configuration in connection with the upcoming political events.

The President accepted the government's resignation and thanked Fradkov for the results achieved in his work. Putin noted such achievements of the government as reasonable economic growth rates, lower inflation, growth in real incomes of the population, and the launch of major social projects. At the same time, the President offered Fradkov to act as chairman of the government until the State Duma approved the candidacy of a new prime minister.

Fradkov announced his resignation to President Putin, which Putin accepted, nominating Viktor Zubkov as Fradkov's successor. Putin bestowed an award on Fradkov and said that he would remain in office until the confirmation of a successor by the Duma. Zubkov was confirmed on 14 September 2007.

According to a poll by the Public Opinion Foundation conducted after Fradkov's resignation from the post of Prime Minister, the majority of Russians could not name any achievements (80%) or failures (75%) in the activities of the former prime minister in his post. In November 2005, British experts predicted the departure of Mikhail Fradkov from the post of prime minister.

== Director of the SVR (2007-2016) ==
On 6 October 2007, President Putin announced that he would appoint Fradkov as head of the Foreign Intelligence Service.

Fradkov's appointment as head of the Foreign Intelligence Service, combined with his service in India, are suggestive of a KGB background. This calls into question earlier assumptions that he was an "outsider" in Kremlin circles and provides an explanation for Putin's trust in him.

In November 2010, reports emerged that one of Fradkov's intelligence officers, a Colonel Shcherbakov, had defected to the United States on 21 June 2010, having betrayed a Russian spy ring in the United States. Critics alleged that the suspicions that Shcherbakov was a double agent which emerged when Shcherbakov turned down a promotion requiring a lie detector test should have been followed up more aggressively. Shcherbakov also had a daughter in the United States. Kommersant, which broke the story, speculated that Fradkov might be replaced by Sergei Naryshkin and/or Russian intelligence services reorganized.

== Personal life ==
Pavel Fradkov, the son of Mikhail Fradkov, is a deputy head of the state property watchdog Rosimushchestvo.

=== Sanctions ===
In April 2018, the United States imposed sanctions on him and 23 other Russian nationals.

He was sanctioned by the UK government in 2022 in relation to the Russo-Ukrainian War.

== Honours and awards ==
- Order of Merit for the Fatherland;
  - 1st class (12 September 2007) – for outstanding contribution to the socio-economic policy
  - 2nd class (1 September 2005) – for his great personal contribution to the state's economic policy, and many years of honest work
- Order of Honour
- Medal "In Commemoration of the 850th Anniversary of Moscow"
- Medal "For Valiant Labour. To commemorate the 100th anniversary of Lenin's birth"
- Fellow Russian counter-intelligence – the strengthening of ties between the Ministry of Foreign Economic Relations and the Federal Counterintelligence Service

== Note ==
Political offices
Preceded by Mikhail Kasyanov	Prime Minister of Russia; 2004–2007	Succeeded by Viktor Zubkov
Government offices
Preceded by Sergei Lebedev	Director of Foreign Intelligence Service; 2007–2016	Succeeded by Sergei Naryshkin
