= List of ambassadors of Turkmenistan to China =

Ambassador of Turkmenistan to China
- Посол Туркменистана в Китае
- Incumbent; Parahat Durdyev since February 21, 2019
- Inaugural holder: Amangeldy Rakhmanov
- Formation: May 31, 1995

The Turkmen Ambassador in Beijing is the official representative of the Government of in Ashgabat to the Government of the People's Republic of China.

== List of representatives ==
Diplomatic agreement/Diplomatic accreditation	Ambassador	Russian language	Observations	President of Turkmenistan	Premier of the People's Republic of China	Term end
June 1, 1992			The governments in Ashgabat and Beijing established diplomatic relations.	Saparmurat Niyazov	Li Peng	
May 31, 1995	Amangeldy Rakhmanov	Рахманов, Амангельды	Until January 1995 - Permanent Representative of Turkmenistan to the United Nations	Saparmurat Niyazov	Li Peng	
March 1, 2001	Boris Şyhmyradow	ru:Шихмурадов, Борис Оразович		Gurbanguly Berdimuhamedow	Zhu Rongji	November 23, 2001
November 23, 2001	Kurbanmuhamed Gadjarovich Kasymov	Курбанмухаммед Гаджарович Касымов	Gurbanmukhammet Kasymov (1954 in Geokcha of the Ashgabat district of the Ashgabat): In 1976 he graduated from the Turkmen State University. Gorky, by profession - a lawyer.; In 1976 he was a lawyer for the Turkmencopstroi trust of Turkmentrebsoyoye, an assistant trainee and deputy prosecutor of the Ashgabat transport prosecutor's office. Then he worked as deputy, 1st deputy prosecutor of Ashgabat, deputy prosecutor of the Turkmen SSR, district head of the personnel department, deputy chairman of the Legal Commission of the Central Committee of the Communist Party.; Since 1990, he held the post of prosecutor of Ashgabat, Since 1991 - prosecutor of the Turkmen SSR.; From January 7, 1993, to April 2, 1993, he was Deputy Chairman of the Cabinet of Ministers of Turkmenistan.; From April 2, 1993, to September 17, 1998, he was Minister of Internal Affairs of Turkmenistan.; From September 17, 1998, to May 24, 1999, he was Minister of Defense of Turkmenistan.; From May 24, 1999, to October 30, 2001, he was Minister of Justice of Turkmenistan.; From October 30, 2001, to March 20, 2008, he was Ambassador Extraordinary and Plenipotentiary of Turkmenistan to China.; From March 20, 2008, to May 29, 2009, he was Ambassador Extraordinary and Plenipotentiary of Turkmenistan to Kazakhstan.; On May 29, 2009, he was dismissed for health reasons.	Gurbanguly Berdimuhamedow	Zhu Rongji	
January 5, 2009	Murad Sapargeldiyevich Nazarov	Гурбанназар Назаров	Ambassador to Iran; Head of the Near East and Central Asia Bureau.; January 16, 1994 Turkmenistan's ambassador to India.; Appointed ambassador to China	Gurbanguly Berdimuhamedow	Wen Jiabao	
February 2, 2016	Rustamova Chinar Tajievna	Чинар Таджиевна Рустамова	November 18, 2016	Gurbanguly Berdimuhamedow	Li Keqiang	
February 21, 2019	Parahat Durdyev	Парахат Хоммадович Дурдыев	Accredited February 21, 2019	Gurbanguly Berdimuhamedov	Li Keqiang (until March 11, 2023) Li Qiang	
