= Vyacheslav Trubnikov =

Russian intelligence officer, journalist and diplomat (1944–2022)

- Вячеслав Трубников
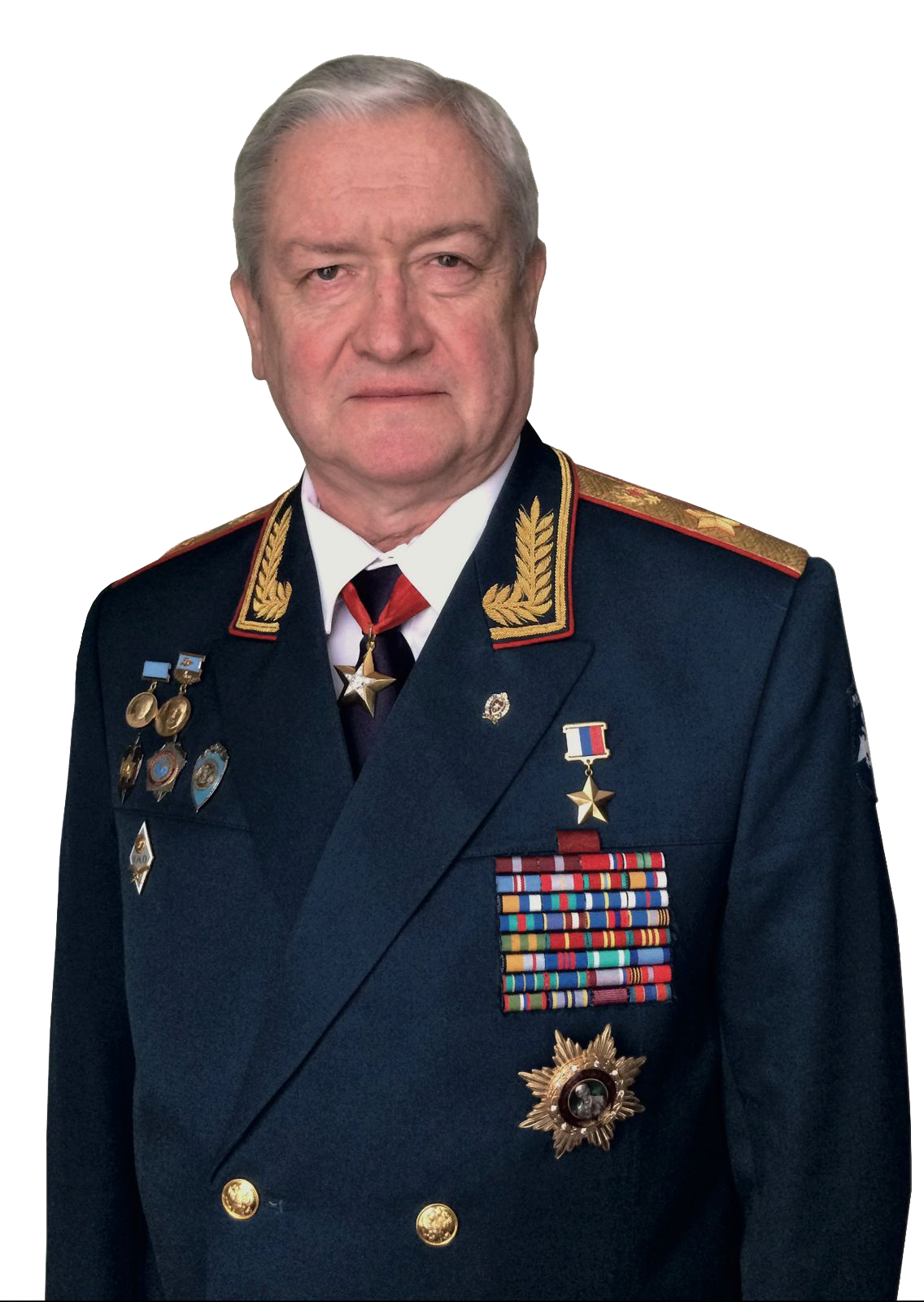

Director the Foreign Intelligence Service
- In office 10 January 1996 – 20 May 2000
- Preceded by: Yevgeny Primakov
- Succeeded by: Sergey Lebedev

First Deputy Minister of Foreign Affairs
- In office 28 June 2000 – 29 June 2004
- Preceded by: Aleksandr Avdeyev
- Succeeded by: Valery Loshchinin

Personal details
- Born: 25 April 1944 Irkutsk, RSFSR, Soviet Union
- Died: 18 April 2022 (aged 77) Moscow, Russia
- Citizenship: Russia
- Education: Moscow State Institute of International Relations, KGB Academy
- Occupation: Politician, journalist, diplomat, secret agent
- Awards: Hero of the Russian Federation, Order "For Merit to the Fatherland", Order of the Red Star, Medal "In Commemoration of the 850th Anniversary of Moscow", Medal "In Commemoration of the 300th Anniversary of Saint Petersburg", Jubilee Medal "50 Years of the Armed Forces of the USSR", Jubilee Medal "60 Years of the Armed Forces of the USSR", Jubilee Medal "70 Years of the Armed Forces of the USSR", Medal "For Impeccable Service", Medal "For Impeccable Service", Russian Federation Presidential Certificate of Honour, Order of Holy Prince Daniel of Moscow

Military service
- Rank: Army general

Vyacheslav Ivanovich Trubnikov (Russian: Вячеслав Иванович Трубников; 25 April 1944 – 18 April 2022) was a Russian journalist, political scientist, intelligence officer, and diplomat. He worked as the Director of Foreign Intelligence Service and was a First Deputy of Foreign Minister of Russia.

He graduated from the Moscow State Institute of International Relations in 1967 and started to work for the First Chief Directorate (Foreign Intelligence) of the KGB. From 1971 to 1977, he worked in India under the cover of a correspondent of the RIA Novosti. From 1977 to 1984, he worked in the central office of the First Chief Directorate. From 1984 to 1990, he worked in Bangladesh and India. From 1990 to 1991, he was the chief of the Department of South-East Asia of the KGB. In January 1992, he became the first deputy of the Director of Foreign Intelligence Service (Russia) Yevgeny Primakov. From January 1996 to May 2000, he was Director of the Foreign Intelligence Service. From June 2000 to July 2004, he worked as a first deputy of Foreign Minister of Russia. On 29 July 2004, he was appointed by Vladimir Putin to the post of Ambassador of Russia to India.

He was a senior network member at the European Leadership Network (ELN).

Trubnikov died on 18 April 2022, at the age of seventy-seven.

== See also ==
- List of Heroes of the Russian Federation

Government offices
| Preceded by Yevgeny Primakov | Director of Foreign Intelligence Service (Russia); 1996–2000 | Succeeded by Sergei Lebedev |
