= Presidential Commission to Counter Attempts to Falsify History to the Detriment of Russia's Interests =

Official commission in the Russian Federation

The Presidential Commission of the Russian Federation to Counter Attempts to Falsify History to the Detriment of Russia's Interests (Russian: комиссия при президенте Российской Федерации по противодействию попыткам фальсификации истории в ущерб интересам России) was a commission in the Russian Federation that was set up by a decree issued by president Dmitry Medvedev on 15 May 2009, officially to "defend Russia against falsifiers of history and those who would deny the Soviet contribution to the victory in World War II". The commission was headed by Medvedev's Chief of staff Sergey Naryshkin. The decree establishing the commission was invalidated on 14 February 2012, and the commission thus ceased to exist. The commission has been described as a further regress toward Soviet and Stalinist practices, glorifying the Soviet Union and its crimes.

== Origins, tasks and related legislation ==
Concerns had been raised in Russia for some time regarding the alleged attempts in some former Soviet countries to revise the outcome of the Nuremberg Trials and rewrite the history of World War II, before the suggestion of the federal Minister of Emergency Situations, Sergey Shoygu, finally raised the issue to that of a state political matter in February 2009.

According to commission chairman Sergey Naryshkin, the tasks of the commission would not be to "re-write" or "politicise" history in the manner of countries like Latvia and Lithuania. Instead, the commission would analyse alleged falsifications of historical facts aimed at tarnishing Russia's international reputation, and advise the Russian president on the ways in which such alleged falsifications can be countered. It was foreseen that the commission would meet at least twice per year.

The commission was staffed by then current and former State Duma members, such as Natalia Narochnitskaya, Sergey Markov and Konstantin Zatulin, and officials of Russia's armed forces and FSB, including General of the army Nikolay Makarov. Among the twenty-eight members were five professional historians: Andrey Artizov (the head of the Federal Archive Agency), Alexander Chubaryan (the head of the Institute of World History of the Russian Academy of Sciences) Natalia Narochnitskaya, Andrey Sakharov (before 2010 the head of the Institute of Russian History of the Russian Academy of Sciences) and Nikolai Svanidze.

== Reception ==
=== In Russia ===
In an interview with the website Liberty.ru, historian Alexander Dyukov has said that "only those who falsify history need fear the work of the commission".

Russian opposition politicians attacked the commission as effectively reintroducing state ideology for the first time since the fall of the Soviet Union, which was explicitly forbidden by the Constitution of Russia of that time. According to former Duma deputy, Vladimir Ryzhkov of the Russian Republican Party, the commission and new legislation criminalizing criticism of the Soviet Union allows the state to impose its own idea of political will and ideology and was also part of a continuing rehabilitation of Stalin and the former Soviet dictator's policies. Human rights activist and former lawmaker Lev Ponomaryov dubbed the decree openly totalitarian and claimed that it discredited President Medvedev as a lawyer. Mikhail Gorbachev has also expressed disapproval of Medvedev's decree.

Some Russian media and individual opposition journalists also criticised the developments. The business daily Vedomosti noted the name of the commission leaves the way clear for the falsification of history in favor of Russia, establishing a "cult of victory"—similar to the civil religions upon which authoritarian and totalitarian states have been built in the past. Journalist and author Yulia Latynina compared the commission to George Orwell's Nineteen Eighty-Four: "The whole idea was copied from Orwell's 1984 and from the famous phrase about Russia as a country with unpredictable past." According to the newspaper Vremya Novostei, the struggle over historical truth in Russia declared at the highest level has taken grotesque form as an article by historian Sergey Kovalyov published on the official website of the Russian Ministry of Defence blamed Poland for starting World War II.

Historian Roy Medvedev criticized the commission for the numbers of professional historians there; he counted three members as historians out of actual five, stating "even they are not recognized among professionals."

=== Outside Russia ===
The legislation received criticism in many countries, mainly former Warsaw Pact and former Soviet republics. The Baltic states argue about the recognition of the occupation, Ukraine disputes the famine in 1930s, and Poland argues the massacre in Katyn. Critics said the official view from Moscow glossed over Soviet-era crimes. In many countries the years of the Soviet Union are seen as hostile Soviet occupations.

Some critics, like Heorhiy Kasyanov from the National Academy of Sciences of Ukraine, said the Kremlin was trying to whitewash Soviet history in order to justify its denial of human rights: "It's part of the Russian Federation's policy to create an ideological foundation for what is happening in Russia right now." Historian and author Orlando Figes, a professor at the University of London, who views the new commission is part of a clampdown on historical scholarship, stated: "They're idiots if they think they can change the discussion of Soviet history internationally, but they can make it hard for Russian historians to teach and publish. It's like we're back to the old days."

Professor Steven Blank of the U.S. Army War College found the formation of the commission to be a further regress toward Soviet and Stalinist practices, glorifying Soviet empire and its crimes. The Economist found the commission and the law to be a demand "that other countries abandon complexity and fit their history into the Soviet straitjacket" and notes that although it was hard to explain Stalin's crimes convincingly during Soviet era, the same work for Russian propagandists is even harder.

== Kremlin responses to critics ==
According to the Kremlin, the History Commission was needed as there were increasingly aggressive attempts to rewrite history to Russia's disadvantage. Sergei Markov, a pro-Kremlin lawmaker and member of the commission, said the new body would not imprison people or blacklist historians whose analyses it disagrees with. Its priority, he said, was to challenge what he said were distorted interpretations of the Soviet Union's role in World War II.

Nezavisimaya Gazeta published the responses of historian Natalya Narochnitskaya, who said "they try to convince us that it was not we who won the Great Patriotic War, that it was Americans." Regarding attempts at equating the Communism imposed on Eastern Europe with Nazism, she claimed that "agrarian peoples: Czechs, Poles, Romanians, Hungarians left us with violins, professors, academicians, cinematographers, whereas Hitler planned for them fates of pig herders and janitors."

== Dissolution of the Commission ==
A presidential decree issued on 14 February 2012, invalidated all the prior legislation concerning the commission, thus dismantling it. Its former member historian Alexander Chubarian said that the commission had fulfilled its task leaving a certain legacy behind, whereas the State Hermitage director Mikhail Piotrovsky and historian Viktor Pleshkov commented that it had been ineffective and useless.

== Members ==
- Commission Chairman Sergey Naryshkin, Chief of Staff of the Russian president
- Alu Alkhanov, former president of the Chechen Republic, Deputy Justice Minister of Russia
- Andrey Artizov, historian, PhD, the head of the Federal Archive Agency
- Alexander Chubaryan, historian, PhD, the head of the Institute of World History of the Russian Academy of Sciences
- Ivan Demidov, ideologist of United Russia and leader of its youth wing; head of the Department for Humanitarian Policies and Public Relations of the Domestic Politics Directorate of the Presidential Administration of the Russian Federation
- Vasily Khristoforov, Federal Security Service General
- Nikolay Makarov, General, Chief of the General Staff
- Sergey Markov, politologist, State Duma and United Russia party member
- Natalia Narochnitskaya, historian and former State Duma member
- Andrey Sakharov, historian, PhD, before 2010 the head of the Institute of Russian History of the Russian Academy of Sciences
- Nikolai Svanidze, historian, TV and radio host
- Konstantin Zatulin, State Duma member; head of task force in the State Duma Committee for the CIS Affairs and Contacts with Compatriots
- V. Zimakov, chief of a department of the Foreign Intelligence Service

and others

== See also ==
- Historiography in the Soviet Union
- League of Safe Internet
