= Director of the Foreign Intelligence Service =

Head of Russian Foreign Intelligence

- Emblem of the Foreign Intelligence Service

- Flag of the Foreign Intelligence Service

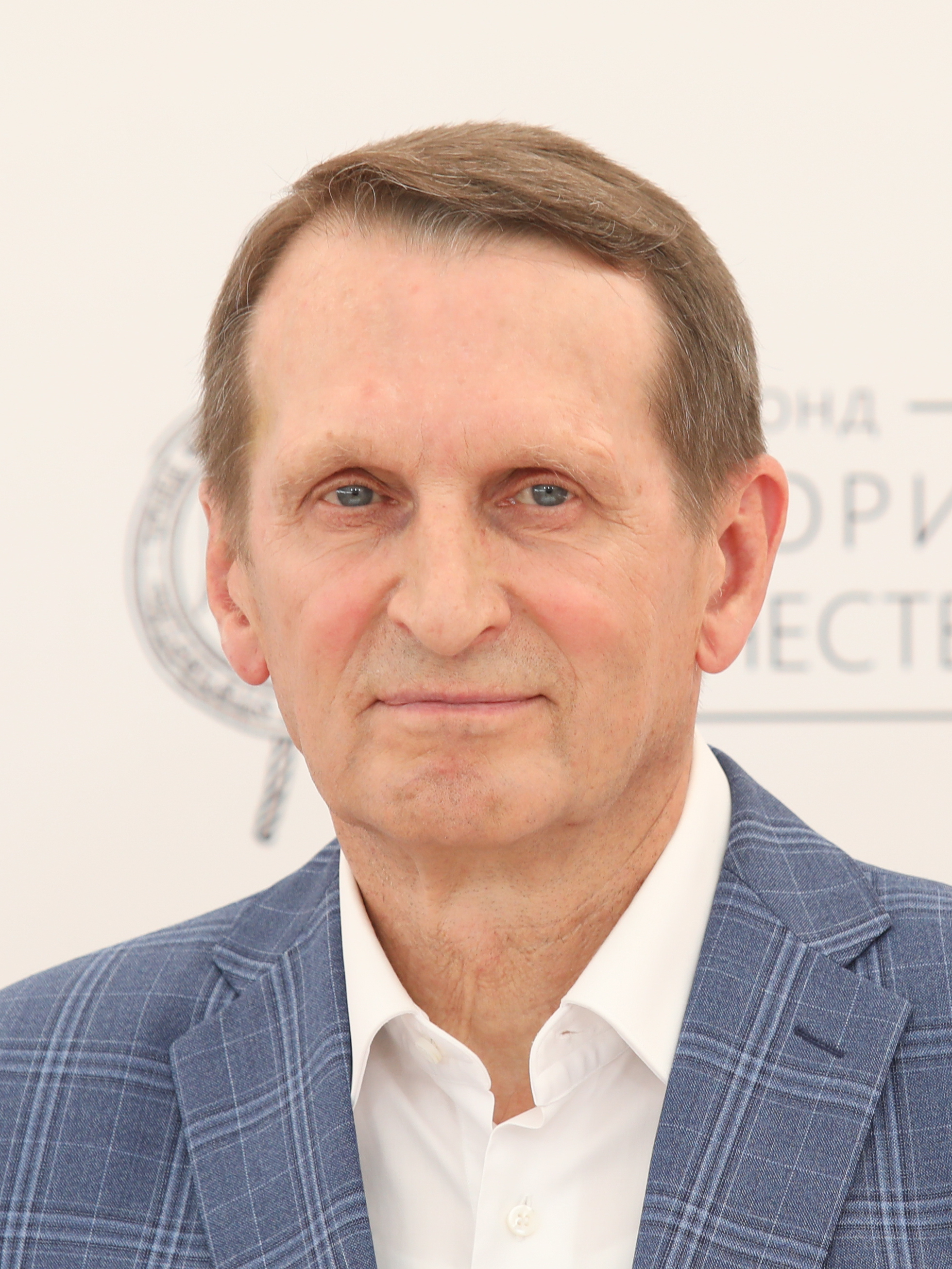
- Incumbent; Sergey Naryshkin since 22 September 2016
- Abbreviation: D/SVR
- Residence: Yasenovo, Moscow
- Appointer: President
- Formation: 26 December 1991
- First holder: Yevgeny Primakov
- Website: SVR

The Director of the Foreign Intelligence Service of the Russian Federation (D/SVR) serves as the head of the Foreign Intelligence Service, which is one of several Russian intelligence agencies. The Director of SVR reports directly to the President of Russia.

The Director is assisted by the Deputy Director, and he is a civilian or a general or flag officer of the armed forces. The Director is appointed by the President, with the concurring or nonconcurring recommendation from the Head of Security Council.

== History ==
On 26 December 1991, Boris Yeltsin appointed the Director of newly created SVR Yevgeny Primakov who led the organization for six years.

The current director is Sergey Naryshkin, who took over on 22 September 2016.

=== List of directors ===
No.	Portrait	Director	Took office	Left office	Time in office	President(s)
1	Yevgeny Primakov	Yevgeny Primakov (1929–2015)	26 December 1991	9 January 1996	4 years, 14 days	Boris Yeltsin
2	Vyacheslav Trubnikov	Vyacheslav Trubnikov (1944–2022)	10 January 1996	20 May 2000	4 years, 131 days	Boris Yeltsin; Vladimir Putin
3	Sergei Lebedev	Sergei Lebedev (born 1948)	20 May 2000	6 October 2007	7 years, 139 days	Vladimir Putin
4	Mikhail Fradkov	Mikhail Fradkov (born 1950)	6 October 2007	22 September 2016	8 years, 352 days	Vladimir Putin; Dmitry Medvedev; Vladimir Putin
5	Sergey Naryshkin	Sergey Naryshkin (born 1954)	22 September 2016	Incumbent	9 years, 350 days	Vladimir Putin

== See also ==
- Director of the Federal Security Service
