= Chinar Rustamova =

Turkmen diplomat

Chinar Tajievna Rustamova (Turkmen: Çynar Täjiýewna Rustemowa) is a diplomat from Turkmenistan. Throughout her career, she has been ambassador to Tajikistan, North Korea, China, Mongolia, and Vietnam. As of 2022, she is currently the Executive Secretary of the National Commission of Turkmenistan for UNESCO.

In 2021, President Gurbanguly Berdimuhamedow awarded her the title “Hero of Turkmenistan.”
