= Maxim Sharafutdinov =

Russian journalist (born 1980)

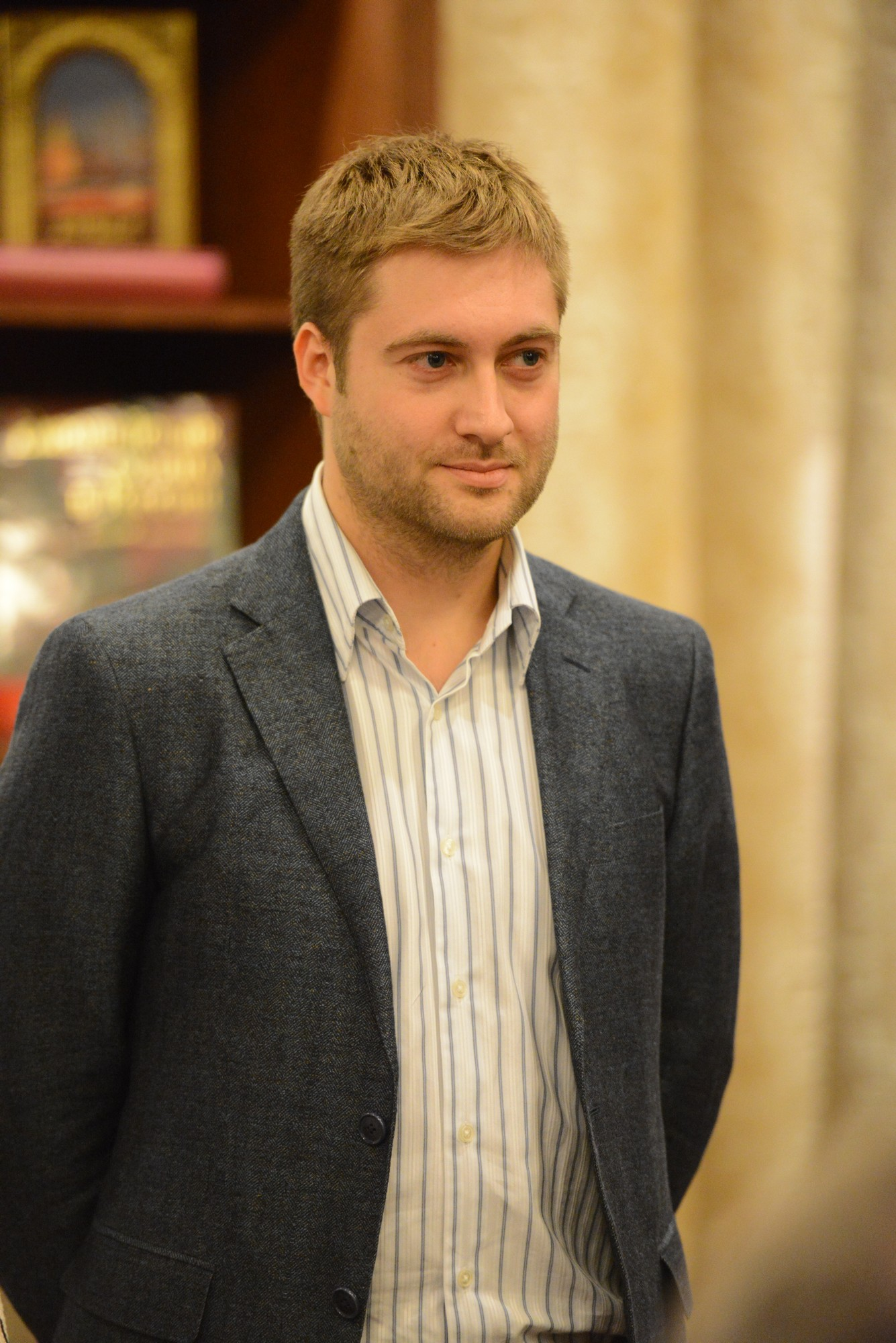

Maxim Rasimovich Sharafutdinov (Tatar: Максим Рәсим улы Шәрәфетдинев, Russian: Макси́м Расимович Шарафутди́нов; born 15 September 1980) is a Russian journalist, television presenter of Channel One.

== Biography ==
Maxim Sharafutdinov was born on 15 September 1980 in Kazan, Tatar ASSR, USSR. Played in KVN. Graduated from Kazan State Technical University. Worked in the TV of Tatarstan.

On 25 March 2010 Sharafutdinov presented the inauguration of the president of Tatarstan, Rustam Minnikhanov.
