= Maýa Gulyýewa =

Soviet and Turkmen opera singer and actress (1920–2018)

- Born: Mamajan Gulyýewa; 1 May 1920; Büzmeýin, Russian SFSR, Soviet Union (present-day Turkmenistan)
- Died: 27 April 2018 (aged 97) Ashgabat, Turkmenistan
- Genres: Classical
- Occupations: Opera singer; actress
- Instrument: Singing
- Years active: 1941–2018

Mamajan Gulyýewa (Note: Turkmen: Mamajan Gulyýewa; Russian: Мамаджан Кулиева, romanized: Mamadzhan Kuliyeva, also given as Guliyeva; Known by the diminutive Maýa, Turkmen: Maýa, Russian: Мая, romanized: Maya) (1 May 1920 – 27 April 2018) was a Turkmen and Soviet soprano opera singer and actress.

== Biography ==
Mamajan Gulyýewa was born on 1 May 1920 in the city of Buzmeyin (annexed and made part of the city of Ashgabat in 2013). She was orphaned at age 8.

A lyric soprano, she studied at the Turkmenistan branch of the Moscow Conservatory from 1938 until 1941. Beginning in the latter year, she was a member of the company at the Turkmen Theater of Opera and Ballet; she was the first to perform roles in Western operas on the Turkmenistan stage. She also created roles in numerous operas by composers from the Turkmen SSR and other Central Asian republics; among these were roles in Shasenem and Gharib, The Rose and the Nightingale, and Zohre and Tahyr by Adrian Shaposhnikov and Abadan by Ashyr Gulyýew. Other roles in her repertoire included Marfa in The Tsar's Bride by Nikolai Rimsky-Korsakov, Marguerite in Faust by Charles Gounod, and the title role in Madama Butterfly by Giacomo Puccini. During her career she appeared in a handful of films as well. For her work, she received multiple awards during her career; she was named an Honored Artist of the Turkmen SSR in 1943, and became a People's Artist of the Turkmen SSR in 1952. In 1955, she was awarded the title People's Artist of the USSR. In 2008 she was named a Hero of Turkmenistan. During her career she also received the Order of Lenin, the Order of the Red Banner of Labour, and the Order of the Badge of Honour. She was a deputy of the Supreme Council of the Turkmen SSR at its second and fourth sessions.

Gulyýewa, who is said to have been a "[Communist] Party organiser" during the Soviet era, continued to receive recognition from the government of Turkmenistan after the break-up of the Soviet Union. In 2010, it was reported that she still had final say over all matters of opera performance in Turkmenistan. Gulyýewa died on 27 April 2018, four days before what would have been her 98th birthday. She had two children.

== Legacy ==
In March 2019, by decree of the Mejlis of Turkmenistan, the Turkmen National Conservatory was named after Maýa Gulyýewa. In October 2019, the Museum of Maýa Gulyýewa was opened on the territory of the Turkmen National Conservatory. On the occasion of the centennial of her birth, a concert of operatic music was held in the Magtymguly Theater in Ashgabat.

== Honours and awards ==
- Hero of Turkmenistan (2008) — for particularly outstanding services to an independent, constantly neutral Turkmenistan and its brave people, a great personal contribution to the development of national culture and art, huge creative successes, and great work to educate the young generation.
- Order of Lenin
- Order of the Red Banner of Labour
- Order of Friendship of Peoples (1980) — for services to the development of Soviet musical art.
- Order of the Badge of Honour
- Jubilee Medal "20 Years of Independence of Turkmenistan"
- Medal "25 years of Independence of Turkmenistan"
- Medal "Magtymguly Pyragy"
- Medal "Garaşsyz, Baky Bitarap Türkmenistan"
- People's Artist of the USSR (Moscow, 1955) — for outstanding services in the development of Soviet art and in connection with the decade of Turkmen literature and art.
- People's Artist of the Turkmen SSR (1952)
- Honored Artist of the Turkmen SSR (1943)
