= Duslyk =

Duslyk Дуслык
- Selo
- Location within Bashkortostan Location within Russia
- Coordinates: 54°33′N 53°46′E
- Country: Russia
- Region: Bashkortostan
- District: Tuymazinsky District
- Time zone: UTC+5:00

Duslyk (Russian: Дуслык; Bashkir: Дуҫлыҡ, Duślıq) is a rural locality (a selo) and the administrative centre of Gafurovsky Selsoviet, Tuymazinsky District, Bashkortostan, Russia. The population was 2,145 as of 2010. There are 39 streets.

== Geography ==
Duslyk is located 10 km southeast of Tuymazy (the district's administrative centre) by road. Subkhankulovo is the nearest rural locality.
