= Kim Jin-pyo =

Kim Jin-pyo may refer to:

- Kim Jin-pyo (musician)
- Kim Jin-pyo (politician)
