= Order of Independence (Turkmenistan) =

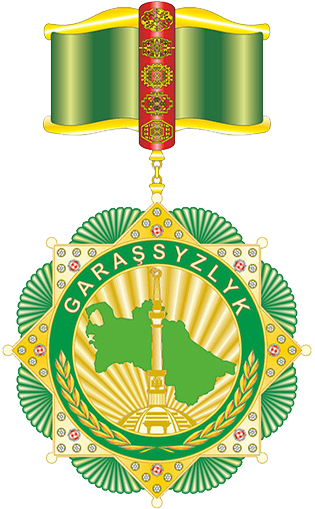
- Native name: Bitaraplyk Ordany
- Type: Order of merit
- Country: Turkmenistan
- Eligibility: Citizens of Turkmenistan and foreign nationals
- Status: Active
- Established: 17 December 1998

The Order of Independence (Turkmen: Garaşsyzlyk Ordany) is a state decoration of Turkmenistan. The Order of Independence was established on June 18, 2001. On February 8, 2014, the appearance of the order was changed.

== Notable Recipients ==
- Raşit Meredow
- Rustam Minnikhanov

== See also ==
- Orders, decorations, and medals of Turkmenistan
- Foreign relations of Turkmenistan
