= Hero of Turkmenistan =

State award of Turkmenistan

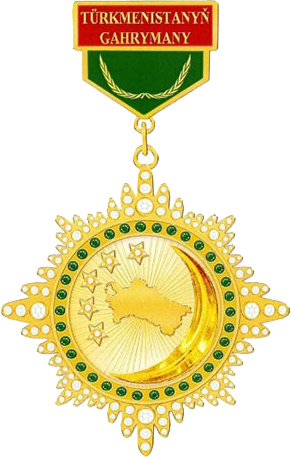
- Type: Award
- Awarded for: Service to Turkmenistan and Society
- Presented by: Turkmenistan
- Eligibility: Turkmen and foreign citizens
- First award: September 30, 1992
- Related: Hero of Russia; Hero of Kazakhstan; Hero of Uzbekistan

The title Hero of Turkmenistan (Turkmen: Türkmenistanyň Gahrymany) is a state award of Turkmenistan. It was first awarded in 1992 and was awarded for service to the implementation of domestic and foreign policy.

== History ==
The title of Hero of Turkmenistan was established by the Law of Turkmenistan "On establishing the highest degree of distinction - the title of Hero of Turkmenistan" adopted by the Mejlis of Turkmenistan on 30 September 1992. The law of Turkmenistan dated 27 December 1995 No. 101-1 approved the new edition of the "Regulation on the title of Hero of Turkmenistan". The next version of the regulation was approved by the Law of Turkmenistan of 28 February 2015.

== Recipients ==
President Saparmurat Niyazov has been awarded the title the most: 30 September 1992, 27 December 1995, 17 July 1998, 25 October 1999, 18 February 2000, 19 October 2001. Other recipients include the following:

- Atamyrat Niyazov (4 May 1992)
- Myratberdi Sopyev (2001)
- Sadulla Rozmetov (2001)
- Gedai Akhmetov (2001)
- Saparmamed Valiev (2001)
- Sapysh Cherkezov (2001)
- Gurbansoltan Eje (5 July 2002)
- Maya Kuliyeva (27 October 2008)
- Gurbanguly Berdimuhamedow (25 October 2011)
- Oleg Kononenko (25 September 2019)
- Aksoltan Ataýewa (25 September 2019)
- Çynar Rustemowa (25 September 2021)

In 2000, by means of a special resolution of President Niyazov, all Turkmen soldiers who died in the Second World War fighting with the Soviet Army were declared heroes of Turkmenistan.
