= Jubilee Medal "20 Years of Independence of Turkmenistan" =

Turkmen state award

- Type: Honorary title
- Awarded for: For conscientious strengthening the independence and sovereignty of Turkmenistan
- Presented by: Turkmenistan
- Eligibility: Turkmen and foreign citizens
- Status: Not awarded
- Established: 2011
- First award: 2011
- Final award: 2012

The Jubilee Medal "20 Years of Independence of Turkmenistan" (Turkmen: Garassyzlygynyn 20 yyllygyna) is a Turkmen state award which was unveiled in 2011 to honour the 20th anniversary of Turkmenistan's independence in 1991.

== Recipients ==
- Gurbanguly Berdimuhamedow
- Ýaýlym Berdiýew
- Kasymguly Babaýew
- Maýa Gulyýewa
- Gülşat Mämmedowa

== See also ==
- Independence Day (Turkmenistan)
