= Specially Designated Nationals and Blocked Persons List =

US sanctions list

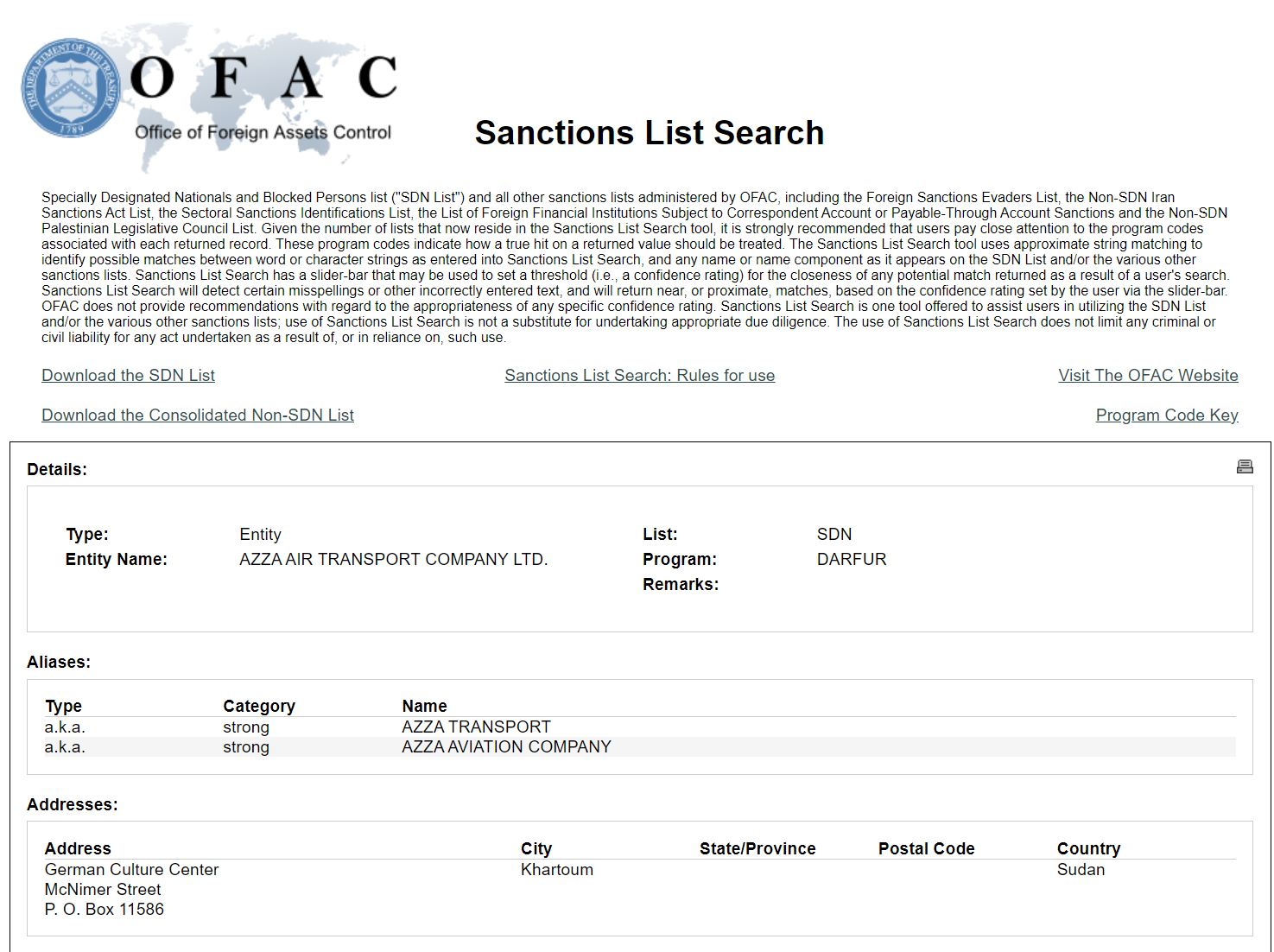
Azza Air Transport, a defunct cargo airline on the SDN List

The Specially Designated Nationals and Blocked Persons List, also known as the SDN List, is a United States government sanctions/embargo measure targeting U.S.-designated terrorists, officials and beneficiaries of governments that are the U.S.'s enemies, and international criminals (e.g. drug traffickers). The list is administered by the U.S. Treasury's Office of Foreign Assets Control (OFAC). When individuals are added to the list of Specially Designated Nationals (SDN), their U.S. assets are blocked. Moreover, their names are added to automated screening systems used by banks in the United States and many foreign countries, making it difficult for them to open or hold accounts, transfer money, or transact properties internationally. Any individual or entity that provides support related to terrorism, drug trafficking or unauthorized military use to any person or entity appearing on the SDN list risks being penalized under the USA PATRIOT Act.

The SDN list contains tens of thousands of individuals and entities that have been identified as posing threats to U.S. national security and foreign policy. All individuals and entities within the U.S. are prohibited from doing business with them or are subject to sanctions for violating the law. Financial sanctions include a ban on investment in the stock of the blacklisted individuals and entities in which the blacklisted individuals have a controlling interest, and a ban on new debt (including all securities such as bonds, credits, bills of exchange, etc.) with a maturity of more than 90 days. After the 2014 annexation of Crimea by the Russian Federation, the U.S. blacklisted a number of Russian and Crimean companies for sanctions. Almost every country is represented on the list.

== Notable sanctioned persons ==
=== Belarus ===
- Natallia Eismant, press secretary to the president of Belarus
- Mikalai Karpiankou, deputy minister of internal affairs
- Viktor Khrenin, minister of defence
- Alexander Lukashenko, president of Belarus
- Dmitry Pantus, chairman of the State Military-Industrial Committee
- Ivan Tertel, chairman of the State Security Committee
- Alexander Volfovich, secretary of the Security Council

=== Bosnia and Herzegovina ===
- Marinko Čavara, former president of the Federation of Bosnia and Herzegovina
- Fadil Novalić, former prime minister of the Federation of Bosnia and Herzegovina
- Alen Šeranić, minister of health and social welfare of Republika Srpska

=== China ===
- Arken Imirbaki, former vice chairman of the Standing Committee of the National People's Congress
- Cai Dafeng, vice chairman of the Standing Committee of the National People's Congress
- Cao Jianming, former vice chairman of the Standing Committee of the National People's Congress
- Chen Quanguo, former secretary of the Xinjiang Uygur Autonomous Regional Committee of the Chinese Communist Party
- Chen Zhu, former vice chairman of the Standing Committee of the National People's Congress
- Padma Choling, former vice chairman of the Standing Committee of the National People's Congress
- Ding Zhongli, vice chairman of the Standing Committee of the National People's Congress
- Hao Mingjin, vice chairman of the Standing Committee of the National People's Congress
- Huo Liujun, former secretary of the Xinjiang Uygur Autonomous Regional Public Security Department of the Chinese Communist Party
- Ji Bingxuan, former vice chairman of the Standing Committee of the National People's Congress
- Li Shangfu, former state councilor and minister of national defence
- Shen Yueyue, vice chairwoman of the National Committee of the Chinese People's Political Consultative Conference
- Wan Exiang, former vice chairman of the Standing Committee of the National People's Congress
- Wang Chen, former vice chairman of the Standing Committee of the National People's Congress
- Wang Dongming, vice chairman of the Standing Committee of the National People's Congress
- Wang Mingshan, former secretary of the Xinjiang Uygur Autonomous Regional Political and Legal Affairs Commission of the Chinese Communist Party
- Wu Weihua, vice chairman of the Standing Committee of the National People's Congress
- You Quan, former head of the United Front Work Department of the Chinese Communist Party
- Zhang Chunxian, former vice chairman of the Standing Committee of the National People's Congress
- Zhang Xiaoming, former deputy director of the Hong Kong and Macao Affairs Office
- Zhu Hailun, former vice chairman of the Standing Committee of the People's Congress of the Xinjiang Uygur Autonomous Region

==== Hong Kong SAR ====
- Eric Chan, chief secretary for administration and former secretary-general of the Committee for Safeguarding National Security
- Teresa Cheng, former secretary for justice
- Andrew Kan Kai-yan, deputy commissioner of the Hong Kong Police Force and director of the National Security Department
- Carrie Lam, former chief executive of Hong Kong
- John Lee Ka-chiu, chief executive of Hong Kong
- Chris Tang, secretary for security
- Erick Tsang, former secretary for constitutional and mainland affairs
- Tam Yiu-chung, former member of the Standing Committee of the National People's Congress (2018–2023)

==== Macau SAR ====
- Wan Kuok-koi, former leader of 14K

=== Colombia ===
- Veronica Alcocer, former First Lady of Colombia
- Armando Benedetti, former Minister of the Interior
- Nicolás Petro, former Member of the Departmental Assembly of Atlántico
- Gustavo Petro, former President of Colombia

=== Democratic Republic of the Congo ===
- Évariste Boshab, former deputy prime minister
- Joseph Kabila, former president of the Democratic Republic of the Congo

=== Cuba ===
- Lis Cuesta Peraza, first lady of Cuba
- Miguel Díaz-Canel, president of Cuba and first secretary of the Communist Party of Cuba
- Esteban Lazo Hernández, president of the Council of State
- Roberto Morales Ojeda, member of the Politburo of the Communist Party of Cuba

=== Iran ===
- Esmail Qaani, commander of the Quds Force of the Islamic Revolutionary Guard Corps
- Mohammad Javad Zarif, former vice president and minister of foreign affairs

=== North Korea ===
- Kim Yong-chol, head of the United Front Department of the Workers' Party of Korea

=== North Macedonia ===
- Nikola Gruevski, former prime minister
- Stevčo Jakimovski, leader of the Citizen Option for Macedonia and former mayor of Karpoš Municipality
- Sašo Mijalkov, former director of the Administration for Security and Counterintelligence

=== Russia ===
- Alexander Dugin, leader of the Eurasia Party
- Petr Fradkov, CEO of Promsvyazbank
- Valery Gerasimov, chief of the General Staff of the Armed Forces
- Igor Girkin (imprisoned), army veteran and former minister of defence of the Donetsk People's Republic, charged by Dutch prosecutors for the downing of Malaysia Airlines Flight 17
- Tina Kandelaki, Russian-Georgian journalist and deputy CEO of Gazprom-Media
- Vladimir Kiriyenko, chairman and CEO of VK
- Dmitry Kiselyov, TV presenter and CEO of Rossiya Segodnya.
- Sergei Lavrov, minister of foreign affairs
- Dmitry Medvedev, deputy chairman of the Security Council and former president of the Russian Federation
- Nikolai Patrushev, former director of the Federal Security Service and secretary of the Security Council
- Vladimir Putin, president of the Russian Federation
- Igor Sechin, CEO of Rosneft
- Sergei Shoigu, secretary of the Security Council and former minister of defence
- Margarita Simonyan, editor-in-chief of RT and Rossiya Segodnya
- Maria Zakharova, spokeswoman of the Ministry of Foreign Affairs

=== Syria ===
- Asma al-Assad, former First Lady of Syria
- Bashar al-Assad, former President of Syria
- Maher al-Assad, former general and commander of the Republican Guard

=== Ukraine ===
- Serhiy Arbuzov, former acting prime minister of Ukraine
- Mykola Azarov, former prime minister of Ukraine
- Raisa Bohatyriova, former minister of healthcare

=== Venezuela ===
- Tareck El Aissami, former minister of petroleum (imprisoned)
- Elías Jaua, former minister of education, minister of foreign affairs and vice president
- Nicolás Maduro, president of Venezuela (imprisoned) (Note: Following the 2026 United States intervention in Venezuela, in which Maduro was captured by and taken to the United States, Vice President Delcy Rodríguez was appointed acting president by order of the Supreme Tribunal of Justice. Both Rodríguez and Maduro have asserted that the latter remains the legal officeholder.)
- Néstor Reverol, former minister of the interior
- Tarek William Saab, ombudsman and former prosecutor general
- Jesús Suárez Chourio, former general commander of the Bolivarian Army of Venezuela
- Iris Varela, former vice president of the National Assembly

=== Other ===
- Reine Alapini-Gansou, second vice-president of the International Criminal Court
- Francesca Albanese, United Nations special rapporteur on the occupied Palestinian territories
- Solome Bossa, judge of the International Criminal Court
- Falih Al-Fayyadh, chairman of the Iraqi Popular Mobilization Forces and former national security advisor
- Beti Hohler, judge of the International Criminal Court
- Luz del Carmen Ibáñez Carranza, judge of the International Criminal Court
- Bidzina Ivanishvili, member of the Parliament of Georgia, founder of Georgian Dream and former prime minister of Georgia
- Ali Ahmed Karti, former minister of foreign affairs of Sudan
- Karim Ahmad Khan, prosecutor of the International Criminal Court
- Svetozar Marović, former president of Serbia and Montenegro
- Apollo Quiboloy, Filipino pastor and leader of the Kingdom of Jesus Christ
- Abu Nuradin Rustamov, ISIS leader

=== Former (deceased) ===
- Saddam Hussein, former president of Iraq (died in 2006)
- Slobodan Milošević, former president of Serbia and Montenegro (died in 2006)
- Anwar al-Awlaki, American-Yemeni Islamic cleric, key leader of al-Qaeda (died in 2011)
- Muammar Gaddafi, former leader of Libya (died in 2011)
- Abu Mahdi al-Muhandis, former chief of staff of the Popular Mobilization Forces and commander of Kata'ib Hezbollah (died in 2020)
- Qasem Soleimani, former commander of the Quds Force of the Islamic Revolutionary Guard Corps (died in 2020)
- Bi Sidi Souleymane, former leader of the Central African Republic-based militia group Return, Reclamation, Rehabilitation (died in 2021)
- Tibisay Lucena, former president of the National Electoral Council of Venezuela (died in 2023)
- Yevgeny Prigozhin, Russian businessman and founder of the Wagner Group (died in 2023)
- Ebrahim Raisi, former president of Iran (died in 2024)
- Amir Ali Hajizadeh, former commander of Aerospace Force of the Islamic Revolutionary Guard Corps (died in 2025)
- Saif al-Islam Gaddafi, son of Muammar Gaddafi, leader of the Popular Front for the Liberation of Libya (died in 2026)
- Ayatollah Ali Khamenei, former supreme leader of Iran (died in 2026)
- Sergei Ivanov, former chief of staff of the Presidential Executive Office (died in 2026)
- Sadio Camara, former minister of defence of Mali (died in 2026)
- Abu Bakr al-Baghdadi, former leader of Islamic State (died in 2019)

=== Former (alive) ===
- Fatou Bensouda, former prosecutor of the International Criminal Court, sanctioned for investigating allegations of war crimes in Afghanistan, Poland, Romania and Lithuania committed by the United States Armed Forces and the Central Intelligence Agency (sanctions lifted in 2021)
- Željka Cvijanović, Serb member of the Presidency of Bosnia and Herzegovina (sanctions lifted in 2025)
- Milorad Dodik, former president of Republika Srpska (sanctions lifted in 2025)
- Siniša Karan, president and former minister of interior of Republika Srpska (sanctions lifted in 2025)
- Alexandre de Moraes, justice of the Supreme Federal Court of Brazil (sanctions lifted in 2025)
- Antal Rogán, member of the National Assembly of Hungary, minister of the Prime Minister's Cabinet Office (sanctions lifted in 2025)
- Nenad Stevandić, speaker of the National Assembly of Republika Srpska (sanctions lifted in 2025)
- Radovan Višković, former prime minister of Republika Srpska (sanctions lifted in 2025)
- Delcy Rodríguez, acting president of Venezuela (sanctions lifted in 2026)
