= An (Chinese surname) =

Ān (安)

Origin
- Meaning: Peace, tranquility
- Region of origin: China

Other names
- Variant forms: Ahn (Korean); Anandra, Ananta, Andrean, Andy, Hadi (Indonesian)

The surname Ān is a Chinese surname (Chinese: 安; pinyin: Ān) which literally means "peace" or "tranquility". It also serves as an abbreviation of Ānxī (安息), meaning "Arsacid" in Chinese and can be romanized as On. Visitors to China who came from Arsacid-held territories often took the name An. In 2008, it was the 110th most common surname in the People's Republic of China, shared by over 1.7 million citizens. The surname is most common in Northern China. It is the 79th name on the Hundred Family Surnames poem.

During the Song dynasty, another Ǎn (俺) was a Jewish Chinese surname.

Distribution of the Chinese surname An in territories claimed by the People's Republic of China

== Origins of Ān (安) ==
=== Iranian ===
==== Parthian ====
During the Qin and Han dynasty, the most common origin of the surname An was as a contraction of Anxi, meaning "Arsacid", and was thus given to people of Arsacid-territory origin, such as An Shigao, a Prince of Persia from the Arsacid Empire. An Xuan, another Parthian, followed An Shigao to Luoyang and assisted in his translations of Buddhist texts.

During the 3rd century, An Faqin (安法欽), a Parthian Buddhist from the Parthian Empire, came to Xijin (西晉).

==== Sogdian ====
In the Tang dynasty period 9th century, An was also sometimes used as the name for the region of Sogdia; previously, Sogdians had exclusively used the surname of Kang (康). The addition was due to the existence of two Sogdian kingdoms, identified as An and Kangju; the state of An was accordingly named due to its occupation by the Arsacids. It is considered one of the "Nine Sogdian Surnames."

=== Xueyantuo ===
During the Northern Wei period in the 6th century, Anchi/Anzhi (安迟) was the Xianbei surname of Uyghur people (回鶻人) a division of the Hui people; they later reduced the surname to An (安). During the Tang dynasty in the 8th century, the An (安) family name was used among the Xueyantuo (薛延陀) people.

=== Khitan ===
During the Qing dynasty, Ardan (阿爾丹) the Daur people (達斡爾族) were given the surname An (安) with the Ar dialect.

== Notable people ==
=== Historical figures ===
- An Chonghui (安重誨), a minister of Later Tang
- An Congjin (安從進), a general of Later Tang and Later Jin (Five Dynasties)
- An Chongrong (安重榮), a general of the Later Jin (Five Dynasties)
- An Chongzhang (安重璋), Sogdian general and Duke of Liang during the Tang dynasty who had his name changed to Li Baoyu amid the An Lushan Rebellion (to distance himself and his family from the notoriety of the rebel An Lushan)
- An Faqin (安法欽), Parthian Buddhist in Xijin (西晉) the Chinese state
- An Jincang (安金藏), Tang Dynasty court
- An Lushan (安祿山), Sogdian-born provincial military governor during the Tang dynasty
- An Min (安民), Song Dynasty official stone carver
- An Qingxu, Chinese nobility, son of An Lushan
- An Shigao (安世高), the first Buddhist missionary to China and a former Parthian prince
- An Sishun (安思順), Tang Dynasty general
- An Xuan, who followed An Shigao to Luoyang several decades later
- An Yanyan (安延偃), adoptive father of An Lushan, Iranian origin, rumoured to have been surnamed Kang originally
- An Zhengwen (安正文), Ming Dynasty painter

=== Modern ===
- Andy On (安志杰; born 1977), American actor and martial artist
- An Dehai (安德海; 1844–1869), Qing Dynasty eunuch
- An Disheng (安迪生; 1868–?), Chinese artist and activist
- An Dongquan (安东权; born 1987), Chinese para-athlete, Paralympic bronze medalist
- An Feng (安风; born 1987), Chinese-born American actress, changed her name to Liu Yifei (刘亦菲)
- An Jiayao (安家瑶; born 1947), Chinese archaeologist
- An Jin (安进; born 1957), Chinese former executive and politician
- Kai-Nan An (安介南), Taiwanese biomedical engineering researcher and academic
- An Pingsheng (安平生; 1917–1999), Chinese politician
- An Qi (安琦; born 1981), Chinese football goalkeeper
- An Qixuan (安琦轩; born 2000), Chinese archer, Olympic silver medalist
- An Qiyuan (安启元; 1933–2024), Chinese politician
- An Weijiang (安伟江; born 1983), Chinese speed skater
- An Xiangyi (安香怡; born 2006), Chinese figure skater
- Yoson An (安柚鑫; born 1992), Chinese-New Zealand actor and filmmaker
- An Yuexi (安悦溪; born 1989), Chinese actress
- An Yulong (安玉龙; born 1978), Chinese short track speed skater, Olympic silver medalist
- An Zhaoqing (安兆庆; born 1957), Chinese retired general
- An Zhengyu (安征宇; born 1963), Chinese former politician
- An Zhisheng (安芷生; born 1941), Chinese geographer and politician
- An Zhongxin (安仲欣; born 1971), Chinese softball player, Olympic silver medalist
- An Ziwen (安子文; 1909–1980), Chinese politician
- An Zuozhang (安作璋; 1927–2019), Chinese historian and educator

==== Stage name ====
- Ady An (安以軒; born Wu Wen-ching (吳玟靜), 1980), Taiwanese actress and singer
- Amber An (安心亞; born Liao Ching-ling (廖婧伶), 1985), Taiwanese actress, singer, television host, model
- Shone An (安鈞璨; born Huang Yi-cheng (黃益承), 1983–2015), Taiwanese singer, actor, television host

== See also ==
- An (disambiguation)
- Ant (name)
