= Military-Industrial Commission =

Military-Industrial Commission may refer to:

- Military-Industrial Commission of the USSR, a central management body for the Soviet defence industry from 1957 to 1991
- Military-Industrial Commission of Russia, established in 2006
