= Roman Golovchenko =

Prime Minister of Belarus from 2020 to 2025

- Роман Головченко; Раман Галоўчэнка
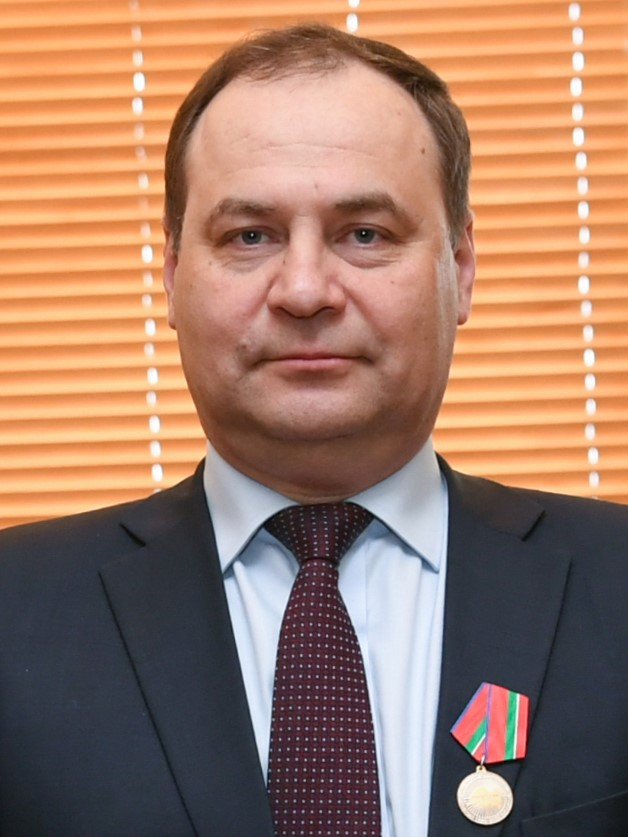
- Golovchenko in 2021

Chairman of the National Bank of the Republic of Belarus
- Incumbent
- Assumed office 10 March 2025
- President: Alexander Lukashenko
- Preceded by: Pavel Kallaur

10th Prime Minister of Belarus
- In office 4 June 2020 – 10 March 2025
- President: Alexander Lukashenko
- Preceded by: Sergei Rumas
- Succeeded by: Alexander Turchin

Chairman of the State Military-Industrial Committee of Belarus
- In office 18 August 2018 – 3 June 2020
- President: Alexander Lukashenko
- Preceded by: Oleg Dvigalev
- Succeeded by: Dmitry Pantus

Belarusian Ambassador to the Gulf states
- In office 22 April 2013 – 18 August 2018
- President: Alexander Lukashenko

Deputy Director of the General Prosecution of Belarus
- In office 2002–2005
- President: Alexander Lukashenko

Personal details
- Born: 10 August 1973 (age 53) Zhodino, Byelorussian SSR, Soviet Union
- Children: 3
- Education: Moscow State Institute of International Relations; Academy of Public Administration (Belarus)

Roman Alexandrovich Golovchenko (Note: Belarusian: Раман Аляксандаравіч Галоўчэнка, romanized: Raman Alaksandaravič Hałoŭčenka; IPA: [ra'man alʲak'sandravʲit͡ʂ ɣa'ɫɔwt͡ʂɛnka]; Russian: Роман Александрович Головченко, romanized: Roman Aleksandrovič Golovčenko) (born 10 August 1973) is a Belarusian politician who is currently the chairman of the National Bank of the Republic of Belarus since 10 March 2025. He previously served as Prime Minister of Belarus from June 2020 to March 2025.

Prior to his premiership, he was a diplomat and worked in the country's general prosecution.

== Early life ==
He was born on 10 August 1973 in Zhodzina as an only child. His father Alexander Nikolaevich Golovchenko graduated from the Belarusian Polytechnic Institute and worked as an engineer in the design bureau of Minsk Tractor Works. Roman Golovchenko lived in Zhodzina up until the age of 10, when he moved with his parents to Minsk, where he graduated from high school. He graduated from the Moscow State Institute of International Relations in 1996. He also graduated from the Academy of Public Administration in 2003.

== Career ==
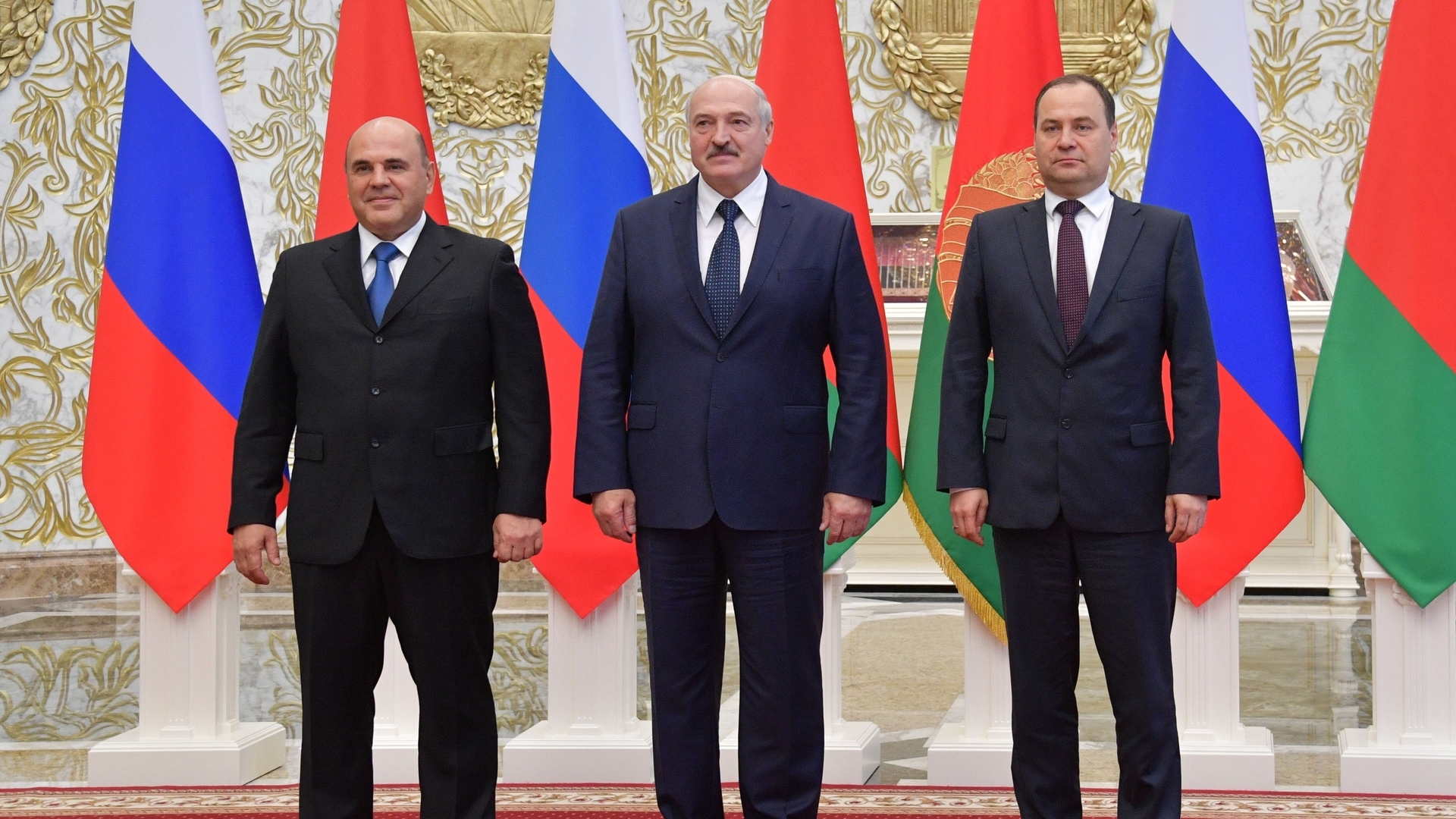
Golovchenko with Alexander Lukashenko and Prime Minister of Russia Mikhail Mishustin in Minsk, 3 September 2020

In 2013, he was made Ambassador to the United Arab Emirates, and was then also responsible for representing the country in Qatar, Kuwait, and Saudi Arabia.

In 2018, he was named as the chairman of the State Military-Industrial Committee of Belarus.

He was appointed as Prime Minister by President Alexander Lukashenko two months prior to the 2020 Belarusian presidential election. He offered his resignation amid a cabinet reshuffle on 17 August 2020, during the 2020 Belarusian protests. However, he was retained as Prime Minister of the new government.

In June 2022, Golovchenko was blacklisted by Canada.

On March 10, 2025, he was relieved of his duties as Prime Minister and appointed Chairman of the Board of the National Bank of the Republic of Belarus.

== Awards ==
- Medal "100 years of the formation of the Tatar Autonomous Soviet Socialist Republic" (2021, Republic of Tatarstan)
- Order of the Friendship of Peoples (2022, Republic of Bashkortostan)

== Personal life ==
He has a son from his first marriage and two daughters from his current marriage. His son Georgy Yatskovsky, is a student of the Bauman Moscow State Technical University. He is fluent in English, Arabic, German and Polish.
