= Federal Service for Defence Contracts =

Coordinates: 55°46′05″N 37°38′21″E

- Федеральная служба по оборонному заказу

Agency overview
- Formed: 9 March 2004 (21 years ago)
- Dissolved: 1 January 2015 (10 years ago)
- Superseding agencies: Federal Antimonopoly Service; Ministry of Industry and Trade
- Jurisdiction: Ministry of Defence
- Headquarters: Ulansky lane, 16, 101000, Moscow
- Parent department: Ministry of Defence
- Website: fsoz.gov.ru

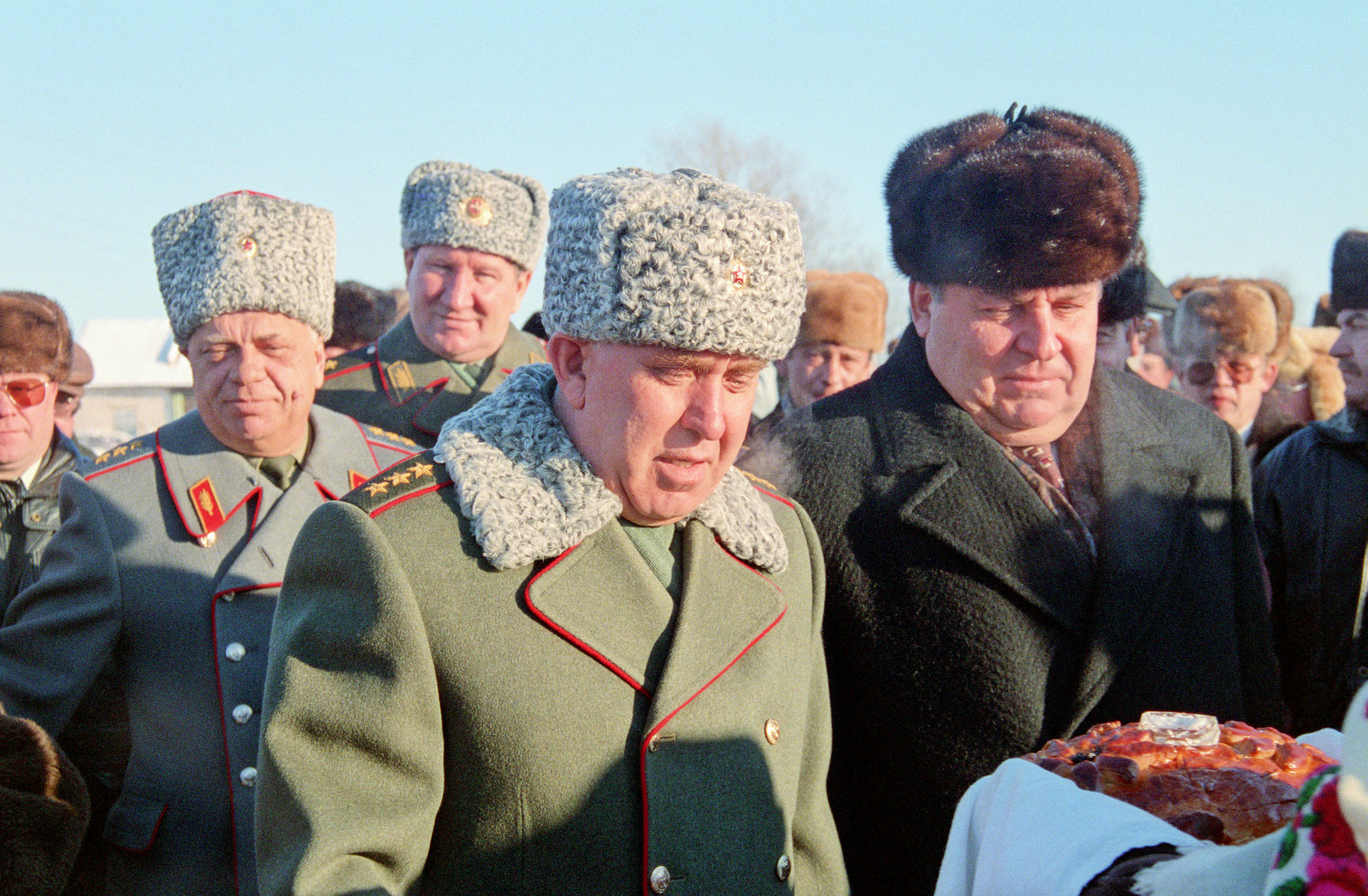
Rosoboronzakaz chief Sergei Maev in 1998 (when he worked for the Ministry of Defense).

Federal Service for Defence Contracts of the Russian Federation (Russian: Федеральная служба по оборонному заказу, short name Rosoboronzakaz) was a government agency operating under the Russian Ministry of Defence.

It controlled and supervised Russian central and regional executive authorities and officials when they acted in the area of contracting services for the needs of the Ministry.

It was formed on March 11, 2003. On September 8, 2014, president Vladimir Putin and prime minister Dmitry Medvedev agreed to dissolve it. Rosoboronzakaz's functions were transferred to the Federal Antimonopoly Service; licensing for other defense contract services was transferred to the Ministry of Industry and Trade.

== See also ==
- Armed Forces of the Russian Federation
- Arms industry of Russia
- Military-Industrial Commission of Russia
