= Arms industry of Russia =

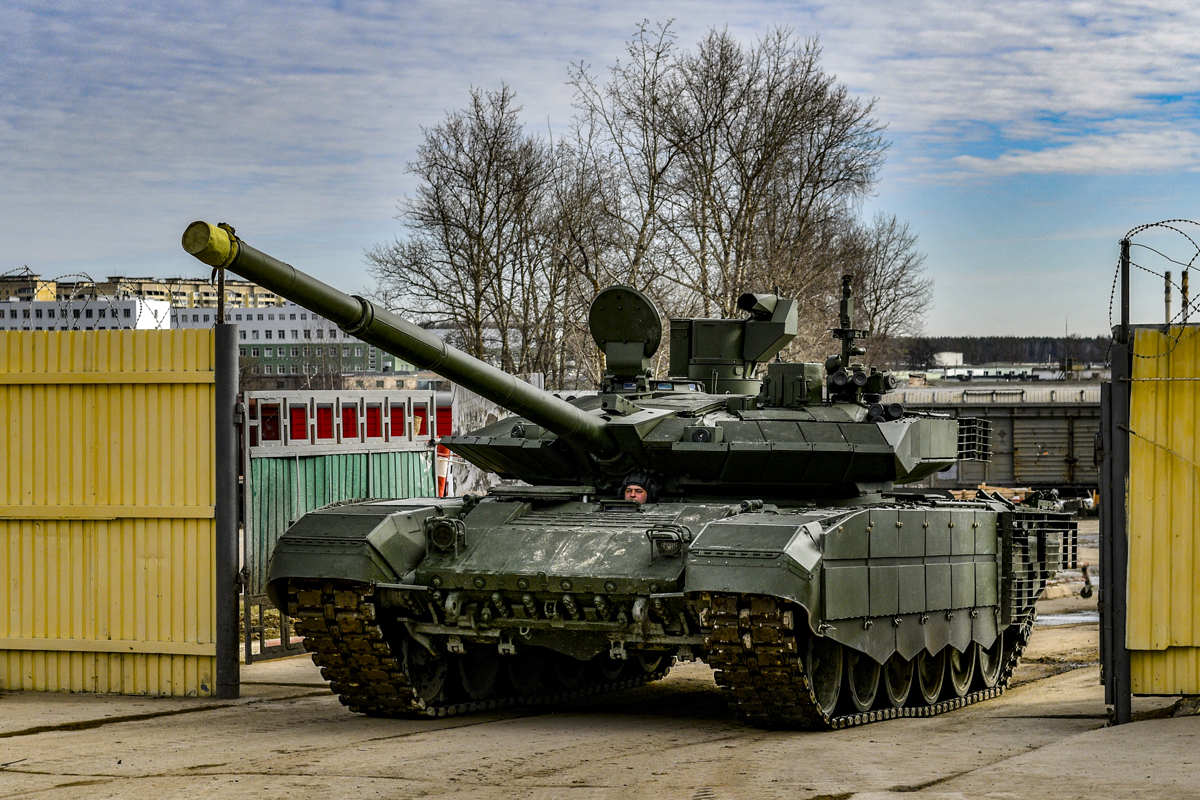
T-90M Main battle tank

The defense industry of Russia is a strategically important sector and a large employer in the Russian Federation. As of April 2025, it employs approximately 4.5 million people nationwide. It also accounts for 20% of all manufacturing jobs in Russia. Total defense spending in Russia reached 7.5% of GDP in 2023.

President Vladimir Putin considered the Syrian civil war to be a good platform for advertisement of the capabilities of Russian weapons capable of boosting Russia's military sales. Russia accounted for 21% of global arms sales in 2014–18, that figure dropped to 11% in 2019–23 (SIPRI's statistics). In 2023, Russia was for the first time the third largest arms exporter, falling just behind France. Russian arms exports fell by 53% between 2014–18 and 2019–23. The number of countries purchasing major Russian arms dropped from 31 in 2019 to 12 in 2023. States in Asia and Oceania received 68% of total Russian arms exports in 2019–23, with India accounting for 34% and China for 21%. The Russian Industry and Trade Minister Anton Alikhanov claimed on 12 August 2024 that the Russian defense industry now employs about 3.8 million people.

International sanctions after the Russian invasion of Ukraine in 2022 have been ineffective in countering Russian arms manufacturing. Russian military production has steadily grown, with missile production now exceeded pre-war levels. Russia currently manufactures more ammunition than all NATO nations combined, estimated at seven times the amount of the West. It has doubled its annual tank production and tripled its artillery and rocket production from pre-invasion numbers. Russia's production costs are drastically lower than those of competing nations, costing about 10 times less to create an artillery shell than comparable NATO ammunition. As of 2024, Russia produces about 3 million artillery shells a year, nearly three times the quantity from the US and Europe. The Russian defense industry has also heavily increased its production of armored vehicles and UAVs since 2023. Russia's expanding arms production has been linked to its managed economy, with heavy state subsidization of unprofitable arms manufacturers prior to the 2022 invasion, in comparison with capitalist western nations with arms manufacturers geared towards maximizing shareholder profit. On 23 November 2024, the German Defense Minister Boris Pistorius stated that Russia has now fully switched to a "war economy" and produces in three months the weapons and ammunition that the European Union produces in a year. NATOs Secretary General Mark Rutte made the same assessment in January 2025. On 3 April 2025, General Christopher Cavoli said before the US Senate Armed Services Committee that Russia is replacing its extensive battlefield losses of equipment and munitions at an "unprecedented rate" due to the expansion of industrial capabilities and the transition to a war economy. The New York Times wrote in April 2026 that Russia was ahead of the United States in building plants for the manufacturing of advanced drones.

== History ==
=== 1990s ===
Following the dissolution of the Soviet Union in December 1991, the Arms industry entered a period of prolonged crisis. In the 1990s, the Government of Russia sharply reduced state defense procurement, many defense enterprises went bankrupt, and others reoriented themselves toward civilian production. At the time of the collapse of the Soviet Union, according to former Soviet leader Mikhail Gorbachev, the government was spending over $100 billion to support the country's military-industrial complex. With the advent of "market relations," newly elected Russian President Boris Yeltsin launched privatization and the creation of joint-stock companies, in which most enterprises associated with the military-industrial complex were sold-off and later liquidated due to unprofitability.

=== 2000s ===
In April 2000, by decree of Russian President, Vladimir Putin, the state-owned military-technical cooperation intermediary, Russian Technologies, was merged with another intermediary, Promexport. This was the first step toward unifying state-owned military-technical cooperation intermediaries. On October 23, 2000, Putin signed a decree lifting restrictions prohibiting the transfer of more than 10% of shares in state-owned defense industry enterprises to the control of holding companies. The lifting of these restrictions allowed the government to begin establishing concerns in the arms industry.

On November 4, 2000, Putin signed a decree merging two intermediaries in the military-technical cooperation (Promeksport and Rosvooruzheniye) into a single intermediary, Rosoboronexport. Rosvooruzheniye's head, A. Ogarev, was dismissed. Former Promexport deputy director Andrey Belyaninov was appointed head of Rosoboronexport, and former Promexport head Sergey Chemezov was appointed deputy general director of Rosoboronexport. Chemezov and Belyaninov were former colleagues of Putin's in the First Chief Directorate of the KGB. On December 1, 2000, Putin signed a decree establishing the Committee of the Russian Federation for Military-Technical Cooperation with Foreign States (CMTC)—a federal executive body for the regulation and control of arms exports. Mikhail Dmitriev was appointed head of CMTC. State oversight of military-technical cooperation was transferred from the Ministry of Industry and Science of Russia, subordinate to Prime Minister Mikhail Kasyanov, to the Ministry of Defense, which reports directly to the President of Russia.

On October 17, 2001, Putin dismissed the head of the Ministry of Industry and Science of Russia, Aleksandr Dondukov. Deputy Prime Minister Ilya Klebanov was appointed minister.

On October 29, 2001, by decree of Putin, the Sukhoi Aviation Holding Company was established, which is wholly state-owned. Later, large stakes in the Sukhoi Design Bureau, Irkut Scientific Production Corporation, and Beriev Aircraft Company were transferred to Sukhoi Holding Company. The decree also transformed the Komsomolsk-on-Amur Aircraft Plant and the Novosibirsk Aircraft Production Association Plant into joint-stock companies, with the majority of their shares transferred to Sukhoi Holding Company.

In November 2001, during a meeting of the commission on military-technical cooperation, Putin demanded that the after-sales service for Russian military equipment and spare parts supplies be streamlined.

On April 23, 2002, Putin signed a decree establishing a holding company based on the Antey concern and NPO Almaz. The holding company included several dozen Russian enterprises developing and producing air defense and missile defense systems. The holding company also received the main enterprises, previously part of the Defense Systems group. In April 2003, Putin appointed Alexander Burutin as his advisor on military-technical policy. Burutin was responsible for state defense procurement, military-technical cooperation, and military-industrial complex reform.

In 2004, the KVTS was reorganized into the Federal Service for Military-Technical Cooperation under the Ministry of Defense of the Russian Federation, and the Goskomoboronzakaz was reorganized into the Federal Service for Defense Procurement under the Ministry of Defense of the Russian Federation.

In 2006, the Russian state arms development program for 2007-2015 was approved. This program provides for the procurement and development of military equipment (military transport aircraft, spacecraft, motor vehicles, armored vehicles, missile defense and air defense systems, ships, and submarines) for the Russian Armed Forces. A total of 4.9 trillion rubles will be allocated to finance this program over its lifetime. In 2006, the Military-Industrial Commission under the Government of Russia was established, similar to the Military-Industrial Commission of the Soviet Union. It was tasked with implementing state military-industrial policy and military-technical support for national defense, law enforcement, and state security.

On March 1, 2007, in accordance with a decree of Russian President Vladimir Putin, Rosoboronexport became the sole state intermediary in military-technical cooperation, and arms manufacturers were deprived of the right to export finished products.

On September 11, 2007, First Deputy Prime Minister Sergei Ivanov announced that the Russian defense industry would transition to long-term contracts (more than three years). Previously, contracts were signed for one year. This change was related to Russia's transition to a three-year state budget.

Since January 1, 2008, by decision of the Military-Industrial Commission, all procurement for the armed forces has been conducted through the Federal Agency for the Supply of Arms, Military and Specialized Equipment, and Materiel.

In 2009, the state allocated approximately 6 billion rubles in subsidies for ongoing lending to defense industry enterprises, and 60 billion rubles in contributions to the authorized capital of these enterprises. During the same year, 76 billion rubles in state guarantees were issued for these enterprises. The total amount of state support for defense industry enterprises in 2009–2010 amounted to approximately 220 billion rubles.

== Economic significance ==
Russia's arms industry employs approximately 3.5 million people as of 2024, and accounts for 20% of all manufacturing jobs in Russia. The combined revenue of the industry's 20 largest companies in 2009 was $12.25 billion. The Russian military-industrial complex consists of nearly 6,000 companies, many of which have been unprofitable and required government subsidization. Persistent government sustenance of these companies has been linked to Russia's demonstrated capability to substantially ramp up arms production after its 2022 invasion of Ukraine. Production of arms grew considerably after 2022, resulting in new production lines, 24 hour operations for factories, and the reopening of mothballed industrial sites.

Visiting Severodvinsk, then-deputy premier of the Russian Government in charge of defense industry, Dmitry Rogozin said the local shipbuilders are contracted to build eight fourth-generation nuclear submarines by 2020, and that more orders are coming. He further said the earlier program for scrapping third-generation submarines is being revised so that "these vessels will get newer missiles and be subjected to a series of repair efforts enabling them to serve for another seven years".

Russian shipbuilders and naval missile manufacturers, such as Sevmash, survived the difficult period of transition from a command to a market-driven economy, and kept skills needed for the development of advanced combat systems. In November 2011, the Russian defense ministry awarded Sevmash contracts for construction of four Project 955A Borey-A strategic underwater cruisers armed with the Bulava intercontinental ballistic missiles. This order comes after construction of three Project 955 Boreys (Yuri Dolgorukiy, Aleksander Nevsky and Vladimir Monomakh). The Russian Navy also ordered five Project 885M Yasen-M fast attack submarines, in addition to the head vessel, the K-329 Severodvinsk. The exact sum of these contracts has not been made public. It is only known that the Alexander Nevsky was built under contract worth 23 billion Rubles.

In March 2020, the Deputy Prime Minister, Yuri Borisov, said that the Russian government intended to restructure the debts of the Russian military–industrial complex in the amount of 750 billion rubles, half of which will be written off. Borisov said this while speaking at a forum of the Ministry of Industry and Trade of Tatarstan.

The last nuclear powered surface combatant built in St. Petersburg was the Peter the Great. The 23,800-tonne cruiser, fourth and the last in the Atlant series (after Ushakov, Lazarev and Nakhimov) was commissioned in 1998, and serves with the Northern Fleet. Saint Petersburg shipbuilders continue to work on civil projects. They have completed one floating nuclear electric power generation station known as Project 20870 with displacement of 21,500 tons. Six more such stations and five nuclear-powered ice-breakers are on order. During the last 20 years Moscow has repeatedly tried to attract the Turkish military with its advanced technology.

A new attempt was made at the IDEF 2013 exhibition. Russia presented its Ka-50-based Ka-52 Alligator attack helicopter and the Mi-28NE Night Hunter. The proposal to start joint development of a surface-to-air missile system with Ankara was perhaps the most intriguing development of IDEF 2013. The SAM would be based on the Russian S-300V Antey-2500 system. Besides the Antey, Moscow has offered the Buk-M2E and the Tor-M2E surface-to-air missile system, and the Pantsir-S1 combined missile and artillery system. Exhibited mock-ups included the T-90S tank, Terminator fire support combat vehicle, the BMP-3M infantry combat vehicle, the BTR-80 and the BTR-80A Armored Personnel Carriers, the Smerch multiple rocket launcher, the Kornet and the Metis-M anti-tank missile systems, the Msta-S 152-millimeter howitzer, the 2S9 120-millimeter self-propelled mortar, and the Vena self-propelled automated artillery system.

Turkey was the first NATO member country to build close military and technical ties with Moscow. Peru will sign a contract to upgrade Lima's fleet of Mikoyan MiG-29 Fulcrum fighters, Peru is interested in buying 700 Kamaz trucks and a new batch of Mi-8/Mi-17 helicopters from Russia. Peru is also considering buying 100 T-90S tanks.

== State orders ==
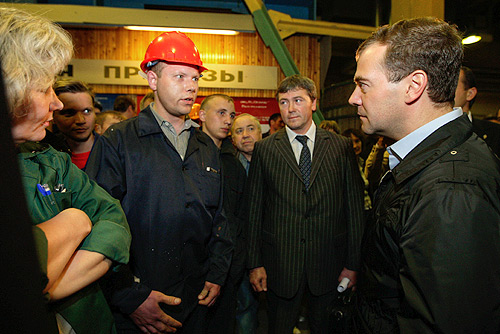
President Dmitry Medvedev with Sevmash employees in July 2009. Sevmash is Russia's largest shipbuilding company and the country's only producer of nuclear submarines.

During the crisis years of the Russian economy, the country's military industry survived mainly on exports. Today, domestic military procurement is an important source of income for the industry. State orders for military equipment have risen considerably during the last decades. While in 2002, the State Defense Order amounted to only RUB 62 billion, by 2007 the sum had risen to RUB 302.7 billion. When calculated in constant 2000 prices, this represents an increase by a factor of two.

The State Defense Order for 2009 was expected to amount to a record of RUB 1.2 trillion, showing an increase of RUB 70 billion from the previous year. The order was expected to be raised by a further RUB 40 billion for 2010, and by RUB 60 billion for 2011. Military-Industrial Commission of Russia is responsible for supervising the distribution and implementation of the State Defense Order. In 2005, Putin initiated an industry consolidation programme to bring the main aircraft producing companies under a single umbrella organization, the United Aircraft Corporation (UAC). The aim was to optimize production lines and minimize losses. The program was divided in three parts: reorganization and crisis management (2007–2010), evolution of existing projects (2010–2015) and further progress within the newly created structure (2015–2025). The State Duma Defense Committee has announced that the nation's defense spending, including research and development R&D spending, will total $16.3 billion (RUB487 billion) in 2010, $19.2 billion (RUB574 billion) in 2011, $24.3 billion (RUB726 billion) in 2012, and $38.8 billion (RUB1.16 trillion) in 2013. While total defense spending will increase, the amount allocated for R&D will drop from the current 2010 level of 22 to 16 percent by 2013. The modernization of weaponry will instead receive a significant portion of total spending, with 13 percent designated for the 2010 fiscal year, 15 percent for 2011 and 2012, and 14 percent for 2013. The top procurement priorities are the following: RS-24 intercontinental ballistic missiles, Bulava submarine-launched ballistic missiles, Su-24 fighters, Su-35 long-range fighters, submarines, corvettes, frigates, and battlefield command-and-control systems. The plan for 2010-2013 only represents a small portion (16%) of that amount, just over RUB2.9 trillion ($98.6 billion). The government intends to spend RUB19 trillion ($613 billion) over the next decade to modernize the armed forces.

The United Aircraft Corporation, one of the so-called national champions and comparable to EADS in Europe, enjoyed considerable financial support from the Russian government, and injected money to the companies it had acquired to improve their financial standing. The deliveries of civilian aircraft increased to 6 in 2005, and in 2009 the industry delivered 15 civilian aircraft, worth 12.5 billion roubles, mostly to domestic customers. Since then Russia has successfully tested the fifth generation jet fighter, Sukhoi Su-57, and started the commercial production of the regional airliner Sukhoi Superjet 100, as well as started developing a number of other major projects. Putin created the United Shipbuilding Corporation in 2007, which led to the recovery of shipbuilding in Russia. Since 2006, much efforts were put into consolidation and development of the Rosatom Nuclear Energy State Corporation, which led to the renewed construction of nuclear power plants in Russia as well as a vast activity of Rosatom abroad, buying huge shares in world's leading uranium production companies and building nuclear power plants in many countries, including India, Iran, China, Vietnam and Belarus. In 2007, the Russian Nanotechnology Corporation was established, aimed to boost the science and technology and high-tech industry in Russia. The gist of the new system is to encourage industry to continually reduce manufacturing expenses and improve resource management. Manufacturer profits are made directly dependent on savings it achieves during the series production of modern weapons. This requires more effective resource management, cutting manufacturing costs and making production more economically efficient.

The Russian Minister of Industry and Trade Denis Manturov claimed in July 2023 that the monthly production of missiles and ammunition had exceeded the production of the whole 2022. He also said in late December 2023 that the production and supply of weapons systems to the Russian troops "at certain positions" had increased 10-12 times throughout the year. The Russian Ministry of Defense said in its concluding report about the 2023 activities that since February 2022 the production of artillery ammunition has increased by 17,5 times, of tanks by 5,6 times, of IFVs by 3,6 times, APCs by 3,5 times and drones by 16,5 times. The Russian President Vladimir Putin claimed on 2 February 2024 that in the last 18 months the Russian defense industry has created 520,000 new jobs and has also increased the production of body armor by 10 times and uniforms by 2,5 times. The Russian Prime Minister Mikhail Mishustin claimed on 3 April 2024 that the manufacturing of automobile and armored vehicles had increased by 3 times in 2023, of destruction means by 7 times and of communications, electronic warfare and reconnaissance equipment by 9 times. The new Russian Minister of Defense Andrey Belousov claimed on 30 July 2024 that the quantity of FPV-drones daily entering the front has sharply increased to 4,000 units. Vladimir Putin claimed on 19 September 2024 that roughly 140,000 drones were supplied to the Russian Armed Forces during the previous year. He also said that it is planned to increase the production of drones by 10 times in 2024. Andrey Belousov claimed on 21 December 2024 that civilian producers have increased the manufacturing of drones to up to 40,000 units per month and EW and signals intelligence systems to up to 5,000 units per month. He went on to claim that civilian manufacturers have supplied the Russian Armed Forces with 31 types of drones, eight ground robotic systems, two types of SIGINT systems, 20 EW systems and four types of sea drones since April 2024. Denis Manturov claimed on 26 December 2024 that the production of military aviation and tanks increased by 2,5 times over the year. He also said about a claimed increase in production of lightly armored vehicles by 4 times and up to 15 times for artillery.

On 23 April 2025, Vladimir Putin claimed that Russian Armed Forces received over 4,000 armored vehicles, 180 aircraft and helicopters, and more than 1.5 million drones (including about 4,000 FPV drones) in 2024. He also claimed that Russian defense industry more than doubled the production of weapons, communications, reconnaissance, and electronic warfare systems over the past year. At the same time, he acknowledged shortage of certain weapons. In 2025, Russia produced more than 34,000 strike drones and decoys as of mid-September which was almost nine times more than in the same period of 2024. On 26 December 2025, Vladimir Putin claimed that Russia has since February 2022 increased the production of tanks by 2,2 times, aircraft by 4,6 times, strike weapons and ammunition by 22 times, IFVs and APCs by 3,7 times, EW and communications equipment by 12,5 times, and rocket artillery weapons by 9,6 times. Denis Manturov said on 3 June 2026 that Russia can now produce over 15,000 FPV drones in a day compared to the same quantity in a month in 2023 and that it has created over 100 modifications of ground and sea robots. On 23 June 2026, Vladimir Putin claimed that more 1,000 samples of weapons and equipment including UAVs and UGVs were tested in combat conditions during the past year. The Deputy Defense Minister Alexei Krivoruchko claimed on 17 July 2026 that the supply of drones to the Russian troops have more than doubled at comparison with 2025. The new Minister of Industry and Trade Anton Alikhanov stated in late July 2026 that the production of air defense missiles has grown "in times" at comparison with the previous year. Deputy Minister of Defense Colonel-General Alexandr Sanchik claimed on 1 August 2026 that the supplies of weapons and military equipment have increased by 5 times since February 2022 and the supplies of destruction means by 12 times. He also said that over 15,000 transportation means were supplied to the troops since the beginning of the year. Vladimir Putin claimed on 18 September 2026 that since February 2022 the production and supply of destruction means and ammunition (including high-precision missiles and charges) increased by more than 22 times, the supply of radar stations increased by almost 5 times and that of armored and tank armament by 2,5 times while the production of drones enhanced by times or by dozens of times depending on the class.

== Exports ==
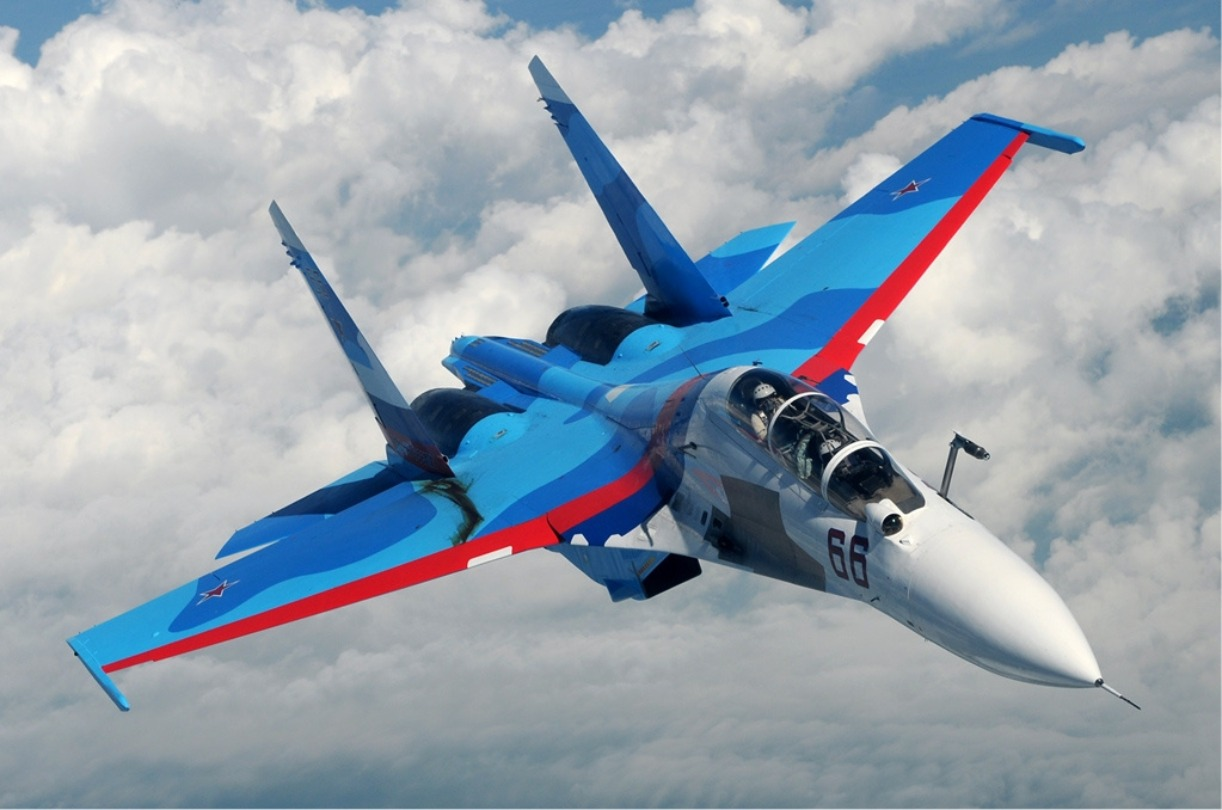
A Sukhoi Su-30 of the Russian Air Force in flight over Russia in June 2010. Sukhoi fighters are popular export products of the Russian military industry.

In 2012, Russia's military exports hit another record sum of $15 billion the structure of military exports had become more balanced. The biggest sales were in aviation equipment – 37 percent. Total exports of land-based weapons and military equipment grew to 27 percent. At the same time, the shares of naval equipment and anti-aircraft systems increased to 18 percent and 15 percent, respectively. Russia is the world's second largest conventional arms exporter after the United States. In 2012, Rosoboronexport received 1,877 enquiries from foreign clients, and, following consideration of the applications, 1,309 contracts were signed. This is 2.5 times more than in 2011. The most popular types of weaponry bought from Russia are Sukhoi and MiG fighters, air defense systems, helicopters, tanks, armored personnel carriers and infantry fighting vehicles. Russian arms were exported to 60 countries. The most significant supplies went to countries in Southeast Asia and the Asia-Pacific region – 43 percent. The second most significant market remains the Near and Middle East, together with North Africa – 23 percent. For the period 2014–18, the Stockholm International Peace Research Institute, SIPRI, found that Russian exports of major weapons had decreased by 17 per cent between 2009-2013 and 2014–18. Russia delivered weapons to 48 states and to rebel forces in eastern Ukraine in 2010–14.

Since 2007, the government-controlled consortium Rosoboronexport has had a legal monopoly on Russian arms exports. All exports must proceed through Rosoboronexport, although 22 firms are allowed to independently export spare parts and components. In 2010, total Russian arms exports amounted to $10 billion. Rosoboronexport's share was $8.6 billion, with independent suppliers making up the difference.

The Moscow-based independent military think-tank Centre for Analysis of Strategies and Technologies has analysed the identified exports of Russian weapons in the year 2009. The share of different weapon types was the following: 61% Aerospace, 21% Ground, 9% Naval, 8% Air Defense and 1% other. In 2010–11, Algeria was the top customer (with an export share of 29%), followed by India (25%) (once India was the largest importer in terms of quantity, and it is still the largest importer in terms of value/money paid) and China (10%). Vietnam became Russia's largest weapons customer in terms of new contracts signed in 2009, especially due to a large order for six Project 636M Kilo-class submarines. Vietnam is expected to considerably increase its share of Russian arms exports in the future. Russia's military exports between 2008 and 2011 amounted to $29.8 billion. The top three customers were India ($8.2 billion), Algeria ($4.7 billion) and China ($3.5 billion). These importers accounted for 55.47 percent of its total exports during that period.

Russian arms exports by year
2001	2002	2003	2004	2005	2006	2007	2008	2009	2010	2011	2012	2013	2014	2015	2016	2017	2018
$3.7 bn	$4.8 bn	$5.6 bn	$5.8 bn	$6.1 bn	$6.5 bn	$7.4 bn	$8.3 bn	$8.8 bn	$10.0 bn	$13.2 bn	$15.2 bn	$13.2 bn	$10 bn	$14.5 bn	$15 bn	$15 bn	$19 bn

As of 2012, Russia has managed to maintain its position as the number two exporter of arms to the world in spite of losing sales in some markets such as Libya and India, by selling products to new markets in Africa and Latin America. Between 2012 and 2015, India will once again become the number one importer ($14.3 billion), followed by Venezuela ($3.2 billion) instead of Algeria. Vietnam will rank third, with imports of $3.2 billion.that the Asia-Pacific now accounts for more than half of the company's deliveries. In recent years Russia approved about $7 billion worth of export loans under weapons contracts. This has enabled Rosoboron export to sign new deals with Myanmar, Malaysia, Indonesia, Sri Lanka and Vietnam." Moscow is determined to keep its share of the Indian defense market and to retain its status as the world's second-largest defence exporter. In 2012 Rosoboronexport signed $17.6 billion worth of new contracts, which represents an increase of 150 percent compared to 2011. The company's portfolio of contracts has reached an impressive $37.3 billion. Russia ranks second in the world's arms export. Moscow supplies arms and military equipment to 66 countries, has concluded agreements on military and technical cooperation with 85 countries and its portfolio of orders for defence-related products currently stands at a staggering $46.3 billion. Russian global arms exports reached $15.2 billion in 2012, up 12% compared to the previous year said Venezuela, Peru, Brazil, Argentina and Mexico were interested in buying helicopters and air defense systems. Grigory Kozlov, head of Helicopter Export Department at Rosoboronexport, said there is good potential for cooperation virtually with all the countries in the region, and especially with Brazil, where Mi-35M helicopters are successfully used. The main partner in the region is a traditional friend of Russia – Venezuela. It is now the second biggest purchaser of Russian arms, after India, that Russia needs to press ahead. The Sukhoi Su-57 fifth generation fighter and the BrahMos supersonic multiple usage cruise missile are the most visible outcomes of joint venture production with India. The Center for Analysis of the World Arms Trade estimates the value of equipment acquired by Caracas from the Russian defence industry at $4.4 billion. This includes 24 Su-30MK2V fighters, 100,000 AK-103 assault rifles, more than 40 Mi-17V-5 multipurpose helicopters, 10 Mi-35M2 attack helicopters, three Mi-26T2 heavy transport helicopters and 5,000 SVD sniper rifles. India is working on two co-design defense projects with Russia – the FGFA and the Multi-role Transport Aircraft, which is already in detailed design stage.

Recently, Russia has made arms deals with UAE, Saudi Arabia, Iraq and Egypt.

Russia claimed that it has earned $13.75 billion from export arms contracts in 2024 and over $15 billion in 2025 with exports to more than 30 countries mostly from Africa, although the West questions the numbers' accuracy. Vladimir Putin claimed in February 2026 that Russia runs or develops more than 340 military-technical cooperation projects with 14 countries. He then claimed in September 2026 that Russia's overall arms export order portfolio exceeds $70 billion.

=== Legal basis ===
Before 1998, the Russian Federation did not have a comprehensive export control law, inheritance from the Soviet Union, in which legal basis for many things was unclear or secret. The legal basis for export control procedures rested on several presidential decrees, government resolutions and a federal law on state regulation of foreign economic activity (1995). From 1992 to 1997 Russia developed control lists for missile, biological, chemical, nuclear and dual-use related items and issued regulations governing the export of these items. At the time, Russian exporters of controlled items were required to obtain two licenses, one from the Federal Service for Currency and Export Control (VEK, under the authority of the Ministry of Defence), and another from the Ministry of Trade. Since 3 July 1998 (the date on which the State Duma adopted a comprehensive federal law on 'Military-Technical Cooperation of the Russian Federation with Foreign States'), the only body competent to deliver a license has operated under the authority of the Ministry of Defense. With regard dual-use goods and services, the Russian government issued a "catch all" export control regulation in a resolution signed on 22 January 1998. Under the resolution, Russian firms are forbidden to sell dual-use goods if they know they will be used in WMD, even if the items are not specifically mentioned on 'control lists'. A comprehensive federal law 'On export control' took effect on 29 July 1999. The law provides, that export control lists should be drawn up by the President, in consultation with the Parliament and industry representatives. This represents a significant change from previous regulations, which gave the executive branch sole discretion over the contents of the lists. In this respect, the law provides a new foundation for export control policy, empowering other actors than those from simply the executive branch.

== Imports ==
Russia relies on foreign suppliers for critical components in its military production, particularly technologically sophisticated imports like integrated circuits and machine tools, which was Russia's largest import category in 2021. Russia has historically relied on Western-produced products for many of these categories.

Due to export controls and sanctions imposed against Russia after its annexation of Crimea and invasion of Ukraine, Russia has been forced to adapt its procurement strategies for imported components key to military production. It has largely been able to successfully evade impacts from such restrictions through a combination of import substitution, parallel imports, and importing from friendlier nations.

Russia's attempts at import substitution have met with mixed results. A 2024 study of 22 technological products found that Russia was able to replace imports at the domestic level for a quarter of them. At least half of the products remained impossible to substitute. Russia's parallel import strategies and pivots to imports from friendlier nations have met with more success. Russia maintains access to advanced western components through imports from other nations, such as Turkey, China, and the United Arab Emirates. Russian customs data indicates that 70% of imported semiconductors, which Russia uses for missiles, drones, and other weapons, are sourced from the United States, through circuitous routes. China has also emerged as a lifeline for direct imports of dual-use equipment, providing 90% of Russia's imports of high priority G7 export-controlled products in 2023.

== Companies ==
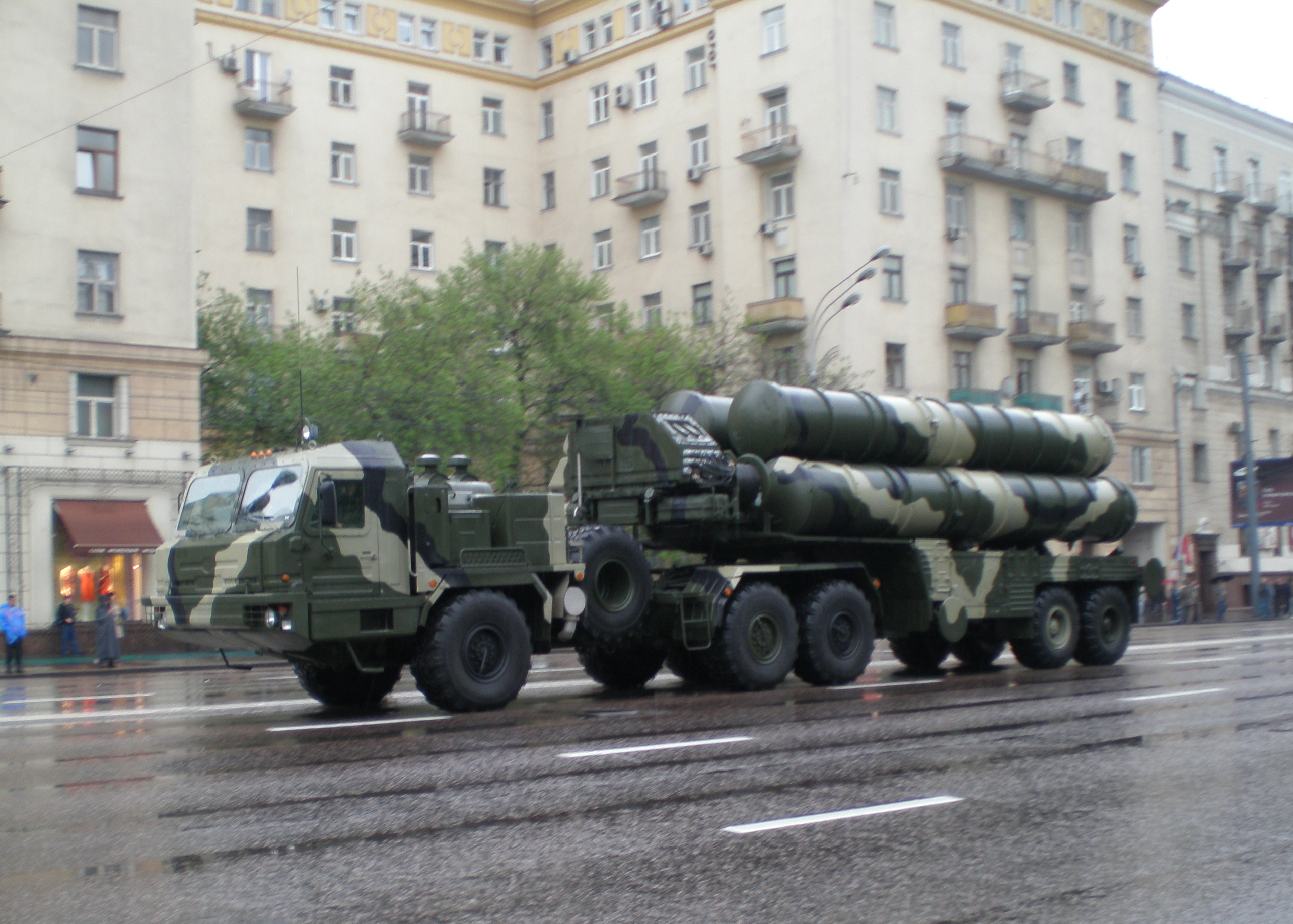
S-400 Triumf air defense missile system manufactured by Almaz-Antey

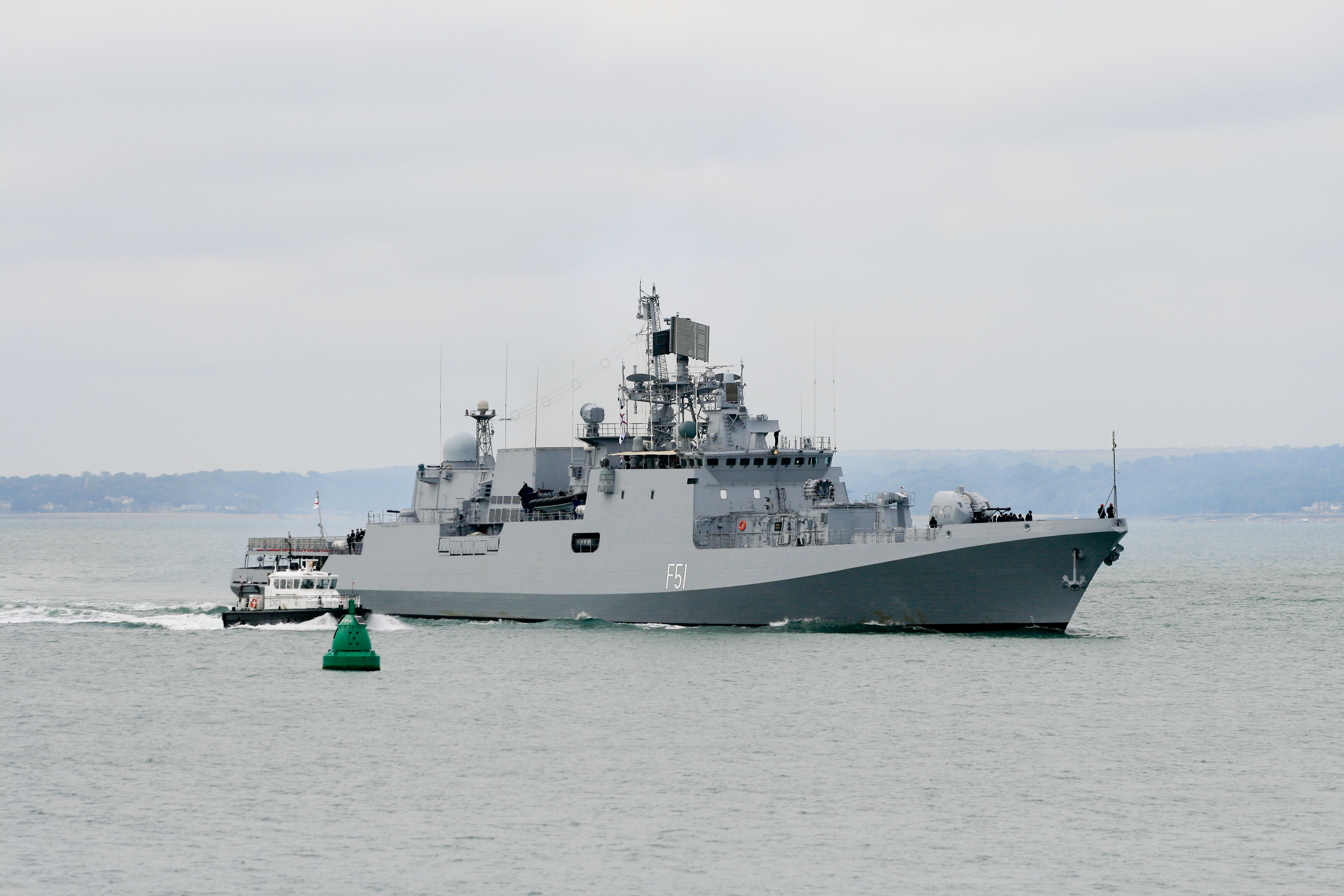
Krivak-class frigate INS Trikand a class of frigates designed and built by United Shipbuilding Corporation

According to Centre for Analysis of Strategies and Technologies (CAST), the most successful businesses in the sector are aerospace and air defense companies. The centre's 2007 rating puts the air defense missile producer Almaz-Antey in the top position (revenue of $3.122 billion), followed by Sukhoi ($1.863 billion) and Irkut Corporation ($1.207 billion). These companies employ 81,857, over 30,000 and 11,585 people, respectively. Across the top 20 rated companies, growth in military production averaged more than 25% in 2007.

In 2008, the combined revenue of Russia's top 10 military-industrial companies grew by 26% from the previous year, amounting to almost $12 billion. The top company was again Almaz-Antey, which boosted its revenue to $4.3 billion. Russian Helicopters produced 122 aircraft in 2008, increasing its revenue from $724 million to $1.7 billion. Uralvagonzavod earned $640 million by making 175 T-90 tanks: 62 for the Russian military, 60 for India, and 53 for Algeria, according to CAST.

The six largest companies of the industry in 2009, based on revenue, were:

1. Almaz-Antey – air defense systems
2. United Aircraft Corporation – fixed-wing airplanes
3. Tactical Missiles Corporation – air- and naval-based missiles
4. Russian Helicopters – helicopters
5. Uralvagonzavod – main battle tanks
6. United Shipbuilding Corporation – submarines, corvettes, frigates, aircraft carriers.

== See also ==
- Armed Forces of the Russian Federation
- Military-Industrial Commission of Russia
- List of Russian weaponry
- List of Russian weaponry makers
- List of Russian aerospace engineers
- List of Russian naval engineers
- Shipbuilding in Russia
- Aircraft industry of Russia
- Future of the Russian Navy
- Russian Navy
- Russia and weapons of mass destruction
- Russian Aerospace Defense Forces
- Strategic Missile Troops
- Universal Combat Platform T-99
- UAC/HAL Il-214
- Sukhoi/HAL FGFA
