= Alexander Burutin =

Advisor to the President of Russia

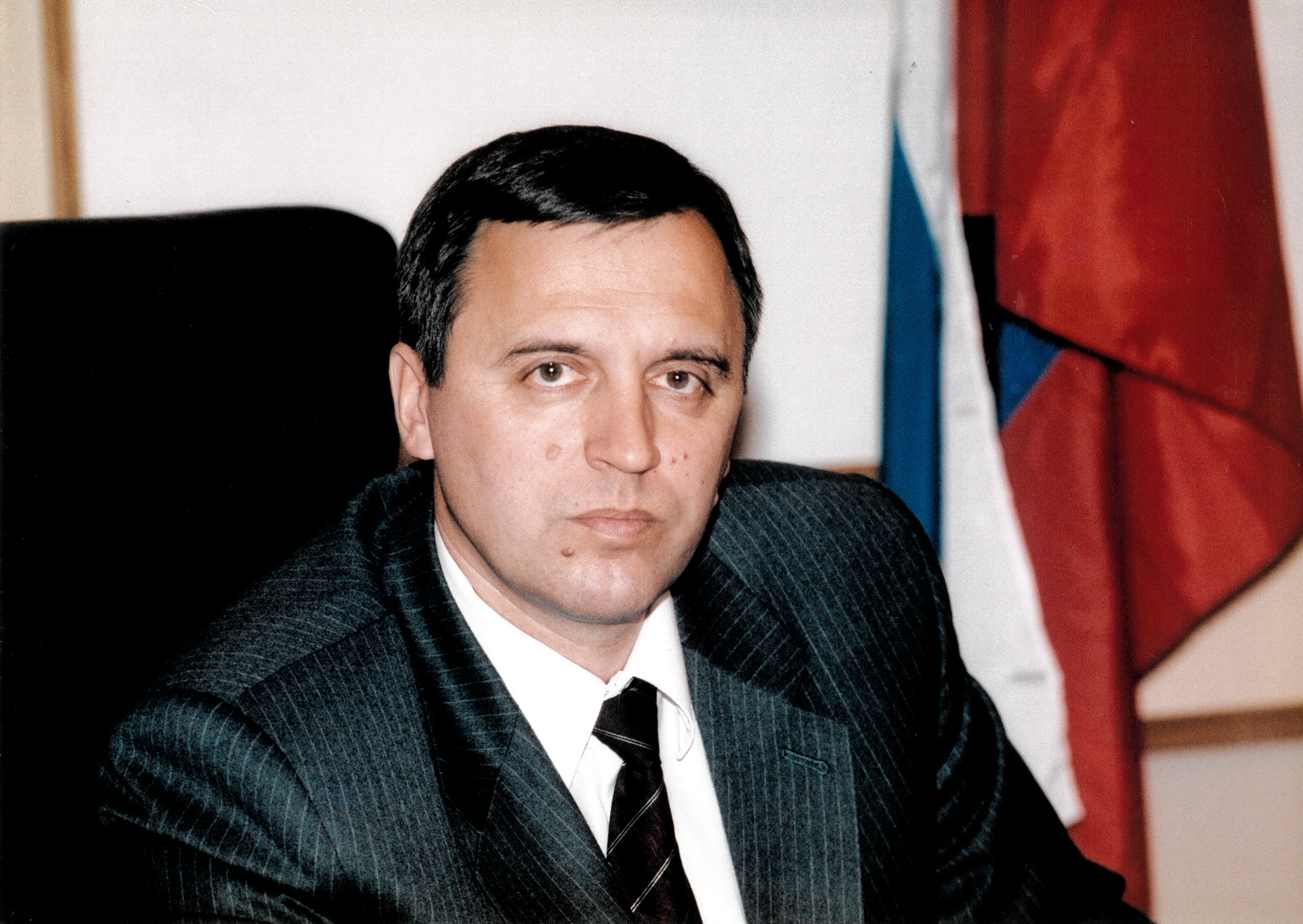
- Born: 24 December 1956 (age 69); Tapa, Lääne-Viru County, Estonian SSR, Soviet Union
- Allegiance: Soviet Union (to 1991); Russia
- Branch: Soviet Army; Russian Ground Forces
- Service years: 1978–2010
- Rank: Lieutenant general

Alexander Germanovich Burutin (Russian: Александр Германович Бурутин; born 24 December 1956) is a retired Russian Ground Forces lieutenant general. He was a military adviser to the President of Russia from 2003 to 2007 and was First Deputy Chief of the General Staff of the Armed Forces of the Russian Federation from 2007 to 2010.

From 2011 to 2013 - Deputy Director for Research of the Institute for Economic Safety and Strategic Planning of the Financial University under the Government of the Russian Federation. From 2013 to 2014, Director for Planning and Organization of Research and Development of the Financial University under the Government of the Russian Federation. Since 2014, an Advisor to the General Director, and since 2018, Deputy General Director for Strategy of ARMZ Uranium Holding, the Mining Division of the State Atomic Energy Corporation Rosatom.

== Biography ==
Born on 24 December 1956 in Tapa, Estonia, Estonian Soviet Socialist Republic, in the family of a soldier. Hereditary officer, the son of a general and became a general. Father - German Alexandrovich Burutin was a colonel-general, first deputy chief of the Main Operations Directorate of the General Staff. Grandfather - Alexander Konstantinovich and great-grandfather - Konstantin Fedorovich Burutiny, also militaries.

=== Education ===
He graduated from the Moscow Higher Military Command School in 1978, the Military Academy. Frunze (with honor) in 1986, the Russian Armed Forces (with honor) in 1997.

=== Military service ===
After graduating from military school, he began military service in the Armed Forces as a commander of a motorized rifle platoon and held various command and staff positions in military units and formations that are part of the Group of Soviet Forces in Germany.

From 1983 to 1986 - student of the M. V. Frunze Military Academy.

From 1986 to 1989 - in the military rank of the major held the posts of commander of a motorized rifle battalion, chief of staff and first deputy commander of a motorized rifle regiment of the Far Eastern Military District.

From 1989 to 1992 - Senior Officer of the Operational Directorate of the General Staff of the Russian Ground Forces.

From 1992 to 1995 - Senior Officer - Operator of the Directorate of the Main Operational Directorate of the General Staff of the RF Armed Forces.

From 1995 to 1997 - a student of the Military Academy of the General Staff of the Armed Forces of Russia.

From 1997 to 2003 - Head of the Group, Head of the Direction, - Deputy Head of the Directorate of the Main Operational Directorate of the General Staff of the RF Armed Forces.

=== Political and state activities ===
In April 2003, he was appointed adviser to the President of the Russian Federation on military technical policy. In March 2004, after reorganization of the Presidential Administration of Russia, he was again approved to this position. As an adviser to the President of the Russian Federation, he was in charge of defense industry of Russia and the state weapon program.

From 2003 to 2007 the member of the Military-Industrial Commission of Russia (Commission under the Government of the Russian Federation on military-industrial issues).

From 2004 to 2007 the member of the Maritime Collegium under the Government of the Russian Federation.

From 2004 to 2007 – the Chairman of the Board of directors of the JSC Military-Industrial Corporation Scientific and Production Association of Mechanical Engineering.

Engaged in scientific activities. In 2007, PhD in political science.

In March 2007, he headed the United Shipbuilding Corporation (USC), the main task at this position was to implement a project to build new shipyards and strengthen relations with private shareholders of shipyards.

On 20 June 2007, he was appointed the Deputy Chairman of the Government Commission for Ensuring the Integration of Enterprises of the Shipbuilding Complex of the Russian Federation.

In August 2007, resigned from USC. In September 2007, he was appointed First Deputy Chief of the General Staff of the Armed Forces of the Russian Federation. At this position he was in charge of strategic planning, international military cooperation, Russian Federation' Armed Forces and other troops command and control system development.

He took part in the counter-terrorist operation in the North Caucasus. Member of the National Anti-Terrorism Committee (2008–2010). Combat veteran (2008).

In 2010, he participated in the preparation of a nuclear arms reduction treaty between the United States and the Russian Federation with the formal name of Measures for the Further Reduction and Limitation of Strategic Offensive Arms called New START (Strategic Arms Reduction Treaty). Represented the draft of the Treaty in the State Duma of the Russian Federation.

In 2009 - 2010, criticized the plans of the Ministry of Defense headed by the Minister Anatoliy Serdyukov and Chief of the General Staff (Russia) Nikolay Yegorovich Makarov related to the Armed Forces reshaping. In September 2010, because of the disagreements with the leadership of the Ministry of Defence, resigned from the Armed Forces of the Russian Federation. In November 2010, by a decree of the President of the Russian Federation has been fired from active military service at the age of 53 years, not achieving the age limit for that position (60 years).

In 2009, got the Russian Federation Government Award in the field of science and technology for the development and creation of new equipment.

=== Scientific activity ===
Since retiring, he resumed his scientific activities. In 2012, he became a doktor nauk in technical sciences, got the professor degree (in 2011) and became a fellow (in 2017) of the Academy of Military Science (Russia). Author of over 80 scientific papers and publications.

He was deputy director in charge of science activity of the Institute for Economic Safety and Strategic Planning of the Financial University under the Government of the Russian Federation. In 2013–2014, at the working group, he participated in preparing of the draft Federal Law "On Strategic Planning of the Russian Federation".

=== Production activity ===
In 2013, he was appointed advisor to the general director of JSC Atomredmetzoloto (ARMZ Uranium Holding), the main activity - interaction with government authorities. From August 2018 – present, is the Deputy General Director for Strategy. Along with issues related to the development and implementation of the ARMZ Uranium Holding Co. strategy, follows the interaction of the Rosatom mining division enterprises with the media and the public (government bodies, public, environmental organizations, the local population of the regions of presence, etc.)

Since 2015, headed the board of directors of JSC Dalur, the youngest and most effective asset of ARMZ Uranium Holding, engaged in the extraction of uranium using an environmentally friendly method of underground leaching.

In 2017, appointed the Head of the Expert Council of the State Duma Committee on Defence.

== Family ==
He is married, has two sons (both became soldiers).

== Awards ==
- Order of Military Merit 1998
- Order of Honour 2006
