= Huo Liujun =

Chinese politician and party secretary

- 霍留军

Communist Party Secretary of Xinjiang Uygur Autonomous Regional Public Security Department
- In office February 2017 – April 2019
- Chief: Wang Mingshan
- Preceded by: Zhu Changjie
- Succeeded by: Wang Mingshan

Personal details
- Born: 13 August 1960 (age 65) China
- Party: Chinese Communist Party

Military service
- Allegiance: People's Republic of China
- Branch/service: People's Armed Police
- Rank: Major general

Chinese name
- Simplified Chinese: 霍留军
- Traditional Chinese: 霍留軍
Transcriptions
Standard Mandarin
- Hanyu Pinyin: Huò Liújūn

Huo Liujun (Chinese: 霍留军; born 13 August 1960) is a Chinese politician currently serving as party secretary of Xinjiang Uygur Autonomous Regional Public Security Department since March 2017.

== Biography ==
Born on 13 August 1960, he assumed various posts in the Xinjiang Uygur Autonomous Regional Public Security Department, where he was promoted to deputy chief in August 2015 and party secretary, the top political position in the department, in March 2017.

On 9 July 2020, the United States government imposed Global Magnitsky Human Rights Accountability Act sanctions and visa restrictions against him for his connection to similar human rights abuse against the ethnic minorities in Xinjiang. On 11 December 2024, Minister of Foreign Affairs of Canada Mélanie Joly announced Canada's sanctions against Huo and seven other government officials of Xinjiang and Tibet involved in serious human rights violations.

In July 2010, he was promoted to the rank of major general (Shaojiang).

Party political offices
| Preceded by Zhu Changjie | Communist Party Secretary of Xinjiang Uygur Autonomous Regional Public Security Department; 2017–present | Incumbent |
