= Huang Sanping =

Chinese politician

- 黄三平

Communist Party Secretary of Ili Kazak Autonomous Prefecture
- In office July 2013 – December 2016
- Preceded by: Li Xuejun
- Succeeded by: Zeng Cun

Communist Party Secretary of Aksu Prefecture
- In office September 2009 – July 2013
- Preceded by: Zhu Changjie
- Succeeded by: Dou Wangui

Personal details
- Born: March 1957 (age 69) China
- Party: Chinese Communist Party

Chinese name
- Simplified Chinese: 黄三平
- Traditional Chinese: 黃三平
Transcriptions
Standard Mandarin
- Hanyu Pinyin: Huáng Sānpíng

Huang Sanping (Chinese: 黄三平; born March 1957) is a former Chinese politician who spent his entire career in northwest China's Xinjiang Uygur Autonomous Region. As of April 2025 he was under investigation by China's top anti-graft watchdog. Previously he served as a member of the Party Group Committee of the People's Government of Xinjiang Uygur Autonomous Region.

== Career ==
Huang was born in March 1957, while his ancestral home in Huangpi District of Wuhan, Hubei.

Huang was a teacher at Bortala Mongolian Autonomous Prefecture Normal School in November 1976, and joined the Chinese Communist Party (CCP) in June 1978. Then he successively served as secretary and deputy director of the Office of the CCP Bortala Mongolian Autonomous Prefectural Committee, deputy secretary and secretary of the CCP Jinghe County Committee, and vice governor of Bortala Mongolian Autonomous Prefectural People's Government. He was deputy party secretary of Hami Prefectural Committee and executive vice mayor in August 2004 before being assigned to the similar position in Kashgar in July 2007. In September 2009, he rose to become party secretary of Aksu Prefecture, the top political position in the prefecture. He was appointed party secretary of Ili Kazak Autonomous Prefecture in July 2013, in addition to serving as secretary of the Party Working Committee of Khorgos Economic Development Zone and first party secretary and political commissar of the 4th Division of the Xinjiang Production and Construction Corps.

In December 2016, Huang was chosen as a member of the Party Group Committee of the People's Government of Xinjiang Uygur Autonomous Region.

== Investigation ==
On 2 April 2025, Huang was suspected of "serious violations of laws and regulations" by the Central Commission for Discipline Inspection (CCDI), the party's internal disciplinary body, and the National Supervisory Commission, the highest anti-corruption agency of China.

Party political offices
Preceded by Zhu Changjie	Communist Party Secretary of Aksu Prefecture; 2009–2013	Succeeded by Dou Wangui
Government offices
Preceded by Li Xuejun	Communist Party Secretary of Ili Kazak Autonomous Prefecture; 2013–2016	Succeeded by Zeng Cun
