= Zhu Changjie =

Chinese politician (born 1957)

- 朱昌杰

Vice Chairman of the People's Government of the Xinjiang Uygur Autonomous Region
- In office July 2011 – January 2018
- Chairman: Nur Bekri; Shohrat Zakir

Director of the Xinjiang Uygur Autonomous Region Public Security Department
- In office September 2009 – February 2017
- Preceded by: Liu Yaohua
- Succeeded by: Wang Mingshan

Personal details
- Born: June 1957 (age 69) Dongming County, Shandong, China
- Party: Chinese Communist Party (1985-)
- Education: Tarim University of Agricultural Reclamation; Central Party School; Chinese Academy of Social Sciences

Zhu Changjie (Chinese: 朱昌杰; born June 1957) is a former Chinese politician, who was served as the vice chairman of the People's Government of the Xinjiang Uygur Autonomous Region from 2011 to 2018, and the director of the Xinjiang Uygur Autonomous Region Public Security Department from 2009 to 2017.

== Career ==
Zhu was born in Dongming County, Shandong in June 1957. His career is most at Xinjiang.

In October 1976, Zhu was enrolled to propaganda team of the 27th Regiment, Second Agricultural Division, Xinjiang Production and Construction Corps. In 1978, he was enrolled to Tarim University of Agricultural Reclamation, and graduated in 1982. After graduating, he was enrolled to the party committee of Bayingolin Mongol Autonomous Prefecture and served as some positions. In 1993, he was served as the deputy party secretary of Yanqi Hui Autonomous County, and promoted to the party secretary in 1994. In 1998, he was appointed as the standing member of the party committee of Bayingolin Mongol Autonomous Prefecture and the deputy governor. In 2001, he was appointed as the deputy party secretary of Bayingolin Mongol Autonomous Prefecture and the deputy governor.

In August 2004, Zhu was transferred to Aksu Prefecture, and served as the deputy party secretary. He was promoted to the party secretary in January 2005.

After the riots in Ürümqi in July 2009, Zhu was appointed as the director of the Xinjiang Uygur Autonomous Region Public Security Department in September. He also served as the first political commissar of the Xinjiang People's Armed Police Corps in March 2010. In July 2011, he was appointed as the vice chairman of the People's Government of the Xinjiang Uygur Autonomous Region, and the deputy secretary of the Political and Legal Affairs Commission of the Xinjiang Uygur Autonomous Regional Committee of the Chinese Communist Party. In January 2018, he was stepped down the post of the vice chairman of Xinjiang. After retirement, he was appointed as the vice president of China Police Association in September 2021.

== Investigation ==
On 20 June 2026, Zhu was suspected of "serious violations of laws and regulations" by the Central Commission for Discipline Inspection (CCDI), the party's internal disciplinary body, and the National Supervisory Commission, the highest anti-corruption agency of China. He became the third consecutive Aksu Prefecture party secretary to be dismissed from his post.

Party political offices
Preceded by Hou Chang'an	Party secretary of Aksu Prefecture; 2005－2009	Succeeded by Huang Sanping
Government offices
Preceded by Liu Yaohua	Director of the Xinjiang Uygur Autonomous Region Public Security Department; 2009－2017	Succeeded by Wang Mingshan
