= Tarim University =

University in Alar, Xinjiang, China

Coordinates: 40.5400°N 81.2953°E

Tarim University (Chinese: 塔里木大学; pinyin: Tǎlǐmù Dàxué), originally Tarim University of Agricultural Reclamation, is a university in Alar, Xinjiang, China.

== Geography ==
The university campus covers an area of 2,500 acres and lies on the north bank of the Tarim River in Alar, Xinjiang. The buildings cover 250,000 mm^{2} of land.

== History ==
The university was established in 1958 with the hopes of assistance in expanding research in the region. It was one of the first universities in modern China to confer bachelor's degrees.

In 2003, it was authorised to confer master's degrees.

In May 2004, it was renamed Tarim University, a name approved by the Ministry of Education.

== Academics ==
Tarim University has over 800 faculty and staff including over 100 full and associate professors, and 10,000 undergraduate and post-graduate students. It also has students in two-year programs and adult education.

Its library has an expansive 600,000 volumes of books and 1,200 kinds of periodicals. Its own Journal of Tarim University is published in China.

There are eight schools and colleges, offering numerous majors, 26 specialties and 2 leading to master's degrees.

== See also ==
- www.taru.edu.cn
