= Dou Wangui =

Chinese politician

- 窦万贵

Vice Chairman of the Xinjiang Uygur Autonomous Regional Committee of the Chinese People's Political Consultative Conference
- In office January 2018 – March 2024
- Chairperson: Nurlan Abilmazhinuly

Personal details
- Born: October 1962 (age 63–64) Xuzhou, Jiangsu, China
- Party: Chinese Communist Party (1986–2024; expelled)
- Education: Technical School of Xinjiang Academy of Agricultural Sciences; Xinjiang Academy of Agricultural Sciences Staff University; Central Party School of the Chinese Communist Party

Chinese name
- Simplified Chinese: 窦万贵
- Traditional Chinese: 竇萬貴
Transcriptions
Standard Mandarin
- Hanyu Pinyin: Dòu Wànguì

Dou Wangui (Chinese: 窦万贵; born October 1962) is a former Chinese politician who spent his entire career in northwest China's Xinjiang Uygur Autonomous Region. He was investigated by China's top anti-graft agency in March 2024. Previously he served as vice chairman of the Xinjiang Uygur Autonomous Regional Committee of the Chinese People's Political Consultative Conference, and before that, party secretary of Aksu Prefecture.

He was a representative of the 19th National Congress of the Chinese Communist Party.

== Early life and education ==
Dou was born in October 1962 in Xuzhou, Jiangsu. In 1980, he enrolled at the Technical School of Xinjiang Academy of Agricultural Sciences, where he majored in agronomy.

== Career ==
After graduating in October 1982, he became a technician at the Emin County Seed Company. At that time, he also studied at the Xinjiang Academy of Agricultural Sciences Staff University.

He joined the Chinese Communist Party (CCP) in January 1986, and began his political career in February 1990, when he was appointed an official of the CCP Organization Department of the Emin County Committee. He was deputy party secretary of Maralsu Township in August 1991 and subsequently party secretary of Shanghu Township in December 1992. He became a member of the Standing Committee of the CCP Emei County Committee and head of the Organization Department in August 1995 before being assigned to the similar position in Toli County in August 1997. In February 2001, he rose to become party secretary, the top political position in the county, in addition to serving as party group secretary of the People's Congress. He was head of the Organization Department of the CCP Turpan Prefectural Committee in May 2005, and held that office until November 2009, when he was appointed the similar position in Aksu Prefecture. He was made deputy party secretary in September 2011, concurrently serving as secretary of the Political and Legal Affairs Commission. In July 2013, he was named acting party secretary, confirmed two months later. He was chosen as vice chairman of the Xinjiang Uygur Autonomous Regional Committee of the Chinese People's Political Consultative Conference, the regional advisory body, in January 2018.

== Downfall ==
On 20 March 2024, he was suspected of "serious violations of laws and regulations" by the Central Commission for Discipline Inspection (CCDI), the party's internal disciplinary body, and the National Supervisory Commission, the highest anti-corruption agency of China. Dou has been expelled from the Communist Party and dismissed from public office on 7 October 2024. On October 15, the Supreme People's Procuratorate signed an arrest order for him for taking bribes.

On 12 February 2025, he was indicted on suspicion of accepting bribes. On April 18, he stood trial at the Intermediate People's Court of Liuzhou on charges of taking bribes, he was charged with accepting money and property worth over 229 million yuan ($31.9 million) personally or through others. According to the indictment, he allegedly took advantage of his positions to seek benefits for others in project contracting, business operations and job promotions between 2003 and 2022. On July 9, he was sentenced to death with a two-year reprieve for taking bribes, and was deprived of his political rights for life, and all his personal assets were confiscated.

Party political offices
Preceded by Huang Sanping	Communist Party Secretary of Aksu Prefecture; 2013–2022	Succeeded by Wang Gang
