= An Jin =

Chinese politician (born 1957)

- 安进

Chairman of the JAC Group
- In office February 2012 – April 2021
- Preceded by: Zuo Yan'an
- Succeeded by: Xiang Xingchu

Personal details
- Born: March 1957 (age 69) Beijing, China
- Party: Chinese Communist Party (expelled in 2024)
- Education: Wuhan University of Technology; Hefei University of Technology

Chinese name
- Simplified Chinese: 安进
- Traditional Chinese: 安進
Transcriptions
Standard Mandarin
- Hanyu Pinyin: Ān Jìn

An Jin (Chinese: 安进; born March 1957) is a former Chinese executive and politician. He was investigated by China's top anti-graft agency in April 2024. He has been retired for three years. Previously he served as chairman and party secretary of the JAC Group. He was a representative of the 19th National Congress of the Chinese Communist Party.

== Early life and education ==
Born in Beijing in March 1957, An graduated from Wuhan University of Technology and Hefei University of Technology. His father An Zhaoxiang (安朝祥) was factory manager of Hefei Jianghuai Automobile Manufacturing Plant, the predecessor of the JAC Group.

== Career ==
Starting in 1975, he served in several posts in the JAC Group, including director of the General Quality Office of Hefei Bus Factory, deputy director and director of the Automotive Research Institute, director of the Technical Center, and deputy general manager. In 2012, he succeeded Zuo Yan'an as chairman of the JAC Group, serving in that position from February 2012 to April 2021.

== Downfall ==
On 2 April 2024, he has been placed under investigation for "serious violations of laws and regulations" by the Central Commission for Discipline Inspection (CCDI), the party's internal disciplinary body, and the National Supervisory Commission, the highest anti-corruption agency of China. An has been expelled from the Communist Party on 8 October 2024.

Business positions
| Preceded by Zuo Yan'an | Chairman of the JAC Group; 2012–2021 | Succeeded by Xiang Xingchu |
