= Dmitry Pantus =

Belarusian politician (born 1982)

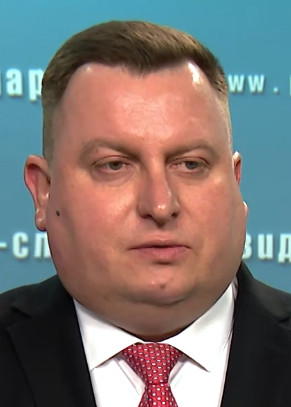
- Pantus in 2023

Chairman of the State Military-Industrial Committee
- Incumbent
- Assumed office 4 June 2020
- President: Alexander Lukashenko
- Prime Minister: Roman Golovchenko; Alexander Turchin
- Preceded by: Roman Golovchenko

Personal details
- Born: 6 September 1982 (age 43)

Dmitry Alexandrovich Pantus (Russian: Дмитрий Александрович Пантус; born 6 September 1982) is a Belarusian politician serving as chairman of the State Military-Industrial Committee since 2020. From 2014 to 2020, he served as deputy chairman. From 2012 to 2014, he served as director of Neman. From April to August 2014, he served as deputy governor of the Grodno region.
