= An Zhisheng =

Chinese geographer (born 1941)

- 安芷生
- Born: February 25, 1941 (age 85); Zhijiang County, Hunan, China
- Education: Nanjing University
- Known for: Quaternary geology, air particle pollution control, global change
- Scientific career
- Fields: Geography
- Institutions: Chinese Academy of Sciences

An Zhisheng (Chinese: 安芷生; pinyin: Ān Zhǐshēng; born 25 February 1941) is a Chinese geographer and politician who specializes in quaternary geology, air particle pollution control, and global change. He is internationally known for his studies on Chinese loess and its implication for paleo-climate and paleo-environment changes. He is a member of the Chinese Academy of Sciences and The World Academy of Sciences, and Foreign Associate of the National Academy of Sciences. He is a researcher and doctoral supervisor of the Institute of Earth Environment, Chinese Academy of Sciences. He is a member of the Chinese Communist Party. He is an editor of Quaternary Science Reviews. He served as the Vice Chairman of International Union for Quaternary Research from 1999 to 2007, and the Vice Chair of International Geosphere-Biosphere Programme steering committee from 2003 to 2006.

== Biography ==
An Zhisheng was born on February 25, 1941, in Zhijiang County, Hunan, with his ancestral home in Lu'an, Anhui. His parents were both teachers. In 1952, he was accepted to the High School affiliated to Nanjing Normal University. After graduating from Nanjing University in 1966, he became a postgraduate at the Institute of Geology, Chinese Academy of Sciences (中国科学院地质研究所). From 1966 to 1984, he was an assistant researchist at the Institute of Geochemistry, Chinese Academy of Sciences (中国科学院地球化学研究所). He was appointed a research associate at the Laboratory of Xi'an Loess and Quaternary Geology (西安黄土与第四纪地质研究室), in 1985, becoming research scientist in 1989. In 1991, he was elected a fellow of the Chinese Academy of Sciences. In 1995, he was appointed director of the Laboratory of Xi'an Loess and Quaternary Geology and dean of the Xi'an Branch, Chinese Academy of sciences (Shanxi Provincial Academy of Sciences), serving until 2000. In 2000, he was elected a fellow of the World Academy of Sciences. He was director of the Institute of Earth Environment, Chinese Academy of Sciences (中国科学院地球环境研究所) in 1999, and held that office until 2002. On May 3, 2016, he was elected Foreign Associate of the National Academy of Sciences.

He is a former delegate to the 14th and 15th National Congress of the Chinese Communist Party, and a former member of the 10th National People's Congress.

== Awards ==
- National Prize for Natural Sciences
- Natural Science Award of the Chinese Academy of Sciences
- Shaanxi Provincial Science and Technology Progress Award
- Tan Kah Kee Earth Science Award
- Li Siguang Geological Science Award
- Science and Technology Award of the Ho Leung Ho Lee Foundation
- Outstanding Scientific Achievement Award of the Chinese Academy of Sciences
