= Mikhail Dmitriyev =

Russian footballer and coach

Personal information
- Full name: Mikhail Aleksandrovich Dmitriyev
- Date of birth: 27 January 1975 (age 51)
- Place of birth: Saratov, Russian SFSR
- Height: 1.76 m (5 ft 9 1/2 in)
- Positions: Midfielder; striker

Team information
- Current team: FC Sokol Saratov (assistant)

Senior career*
Years	Team	Apps	(Gls)
1991	FC Sokol Saratov	1	(0)
1992	FC Irgiz Balakovo	9	(0)
1992–1994	FC Sokol Saratov	24	(3)
1994	FC Sokol-d Saratov	23	(6)
1995	FC Zavodchanin Saratov	13	(1)
1997–2001	FC Iskra Engels	148	(12)
2002	FC Don Novomoskovsk	18	(0)
2002	FC Volochanin-89 Vyshny Volochyok	2	(0)

Managerial career
- 2010–2011: FC Sokol-d Saratov
- 2011: FC Sokol Saratov (caretaker)
- 2012: FC Sokol Saratov
- 2012–: FC Sokol Saratov (assistant)
- * Club domestic league appearances and goals

Mikhail Aleksandrovich Dmitriyev (Russian: Михаил Александрович Дмитриев; born 27 January 1975) is a Russian professional football coach and a former player. Currently, he is an assistant manager with FC Sokol Saratov.

As a player, he made his debut in the Soviet Second League in 1991 for FC Sokol Saratov.
