= Wang Mingshan =

Chinese politician

- 王明山

Vice Chairperson of the Standing Committee of the Xinjiang Uygur Autonomous Region People's Congress
- Incumbent
- Assumed office February 2024

Secretary of Xinjiang Uygur Autonomous Regional Political and Legal Affairs Commission
- In office January 2021 – February 2024
- Preceded by: Wang Junzheng
- Succeeded by: Chen Mingguo

Personal details
- Born: 18 January 1964 (age 62) Wuwei, Gansu, China
- Party: Chinese Communist Party
- Education: Xinjiang University; Jilin University

Wang Mingshan (Chinese: 王明山; pinyin: Wáng Míngshān; born 18 January 1964) is a Chinese politician currently serving as the vice chairperson of the Standing Committee of the Xinjiang Uygur Autonomous Region People's Congress since February 2024. He was a member of the standing committee of the CCP Xinjiang Uygur Autonomous Regional Committee, the region's top authority.

== Biography ==
Wang was born in Wuwei, Gansu, on 18 January 1964. In 1982, he entered Xinjiang University, majoring in radio. He worked in Yili Public Security Department after university in 1986, and joined the Chinese Communist Party (CCP) in April 1990. In September 2000, he became deputy chief of Yili Public Security Bureau, rising to chief in February 2004. He was chief of Ürümqi Public Security Bureau in December 2009, and held that office until April 2015, when he was appointed deputy party secretary of Ürümqi and secretary of the Ürümqi Municipal Political and Legal Affairs Commission. He served as executive deputy secretary of Xinjiang Uygur Autonomous Regional Political and Legal Affairs Commission in November 2015, and five years later promoted to the secretary position. He also served as chief of Xinjiang Uygur Autonomous Regional Public Security Department from February 2017 to January 2021, and vice chairman of Xinjiang Uygur Autonomous Region from January 2018 to January 2021.

In September 2020, Wang was served as the secretary of Xinjiang Uygur Autonomous Regional Political and Legal Affairs Commission.

In February 2024, Wang was appointed as the vice chairperson of the Standing Committee of the Xinjiang Uygur Autonomous Region People's Congress.

=== U.S. sanctions ===
On 9 July 2020, the United States government imposed Global Magnitsky Human Rights Accountability Act sanctions and visa restrictions against Wang for his connection to similar human rights abuse against the ethnic minorities in Xinjiang.

Government offices
Preceded by ?	Chief of Urumqi Public Security Bureau; 2009–2015	Succeeded by An Zhengyu
Preceded by Zhu Changjie	Chief of Xinjiang Uygur Autonomous Regional Public Security Department; 2017–2021	Succeeded by Chen Mingguo
Party political offices
Preceded by ?	Secretary of the Political and Legal Committee of Urumqi Municipal Committee of the Chinese Communist Party; 2015	Succeeded by Zhang Wensheng
Preceded by Wang Junzheng	Secretary of Xinjiang Uygur Autonomous Regional Political and Legal Affairs Commission; 2020–2024	Succeeded by Chen Mingguo
