= An Zhengyu =

Former Chinese politician

- 安征宇

Communist Party Secretary of Kizilsu Kirghiz Autonomous Prefecture
- In office October 2017 – July 2022
- Preceded by: Liu Huijun
- Succeeded by: Wang Xuedong

Personal details
- Born: October 1963 (age 62) Qingyuan County, Hebei, China
- Party: Chinese Communist Party
- Education: Xinjiang University; Minzu University of China

An Zhengyu (Chinese: 安征宇; pinyin: ān Zhēngyǔ; born October 1963) is a former Chinese politician who spent his entire career in northwest China's Xinjiang Uygur Autonomous Region. As of July 2022 he was under investigation by China's top anti-corruption agency.

== Early life and education ==
An was born in Qingyuan County (now Qingyuan District of Baoding), Hebei, in October 1963. In September 1981, he became a worker at the 8th Agricultural Division of Xinjiang Production and Construction Corps. In 1983, he entered Xinjiang University, where he majored in political theories. He joined the Chinese Communist Party (CCP) in December 1985. After graduating in 1987, he continued to work at the Xinjiang Production and Construction Corps and taught at a police school there.

== Political career ==
Starting in December 1991, he served in several posts in the Organization Department of the CCP Xinjiang Uygur Autonomous Regional Committee, including chief staff member, deputy director of the Logistics Service Center, and chief staff member of the Cadre Training Division.

In 2001, he was transferred to Ürümqi, capital of Xinjiang Uygur Autonomous Region. There, he was in turn deputy party secretary of Xinshi District, deputy head of the Organization Department of the CCP Ürümqi Municipal Committee, party secretary of Tianshan District, vice chairperson of the People's Congress, directed of the Ürümqi Municipal Public Security Bureau and finally deputy party secretary of Ürümqi and secretary of the Political and Legal Affairs Commission.

In October 2017, he was transferred to Kizilsu Kirghiz Autonomous Prefecture and appointed party secretary, his first foray into a prefectural leadership role.

== Investigation ==
On 27 July 2022, he was put under investigation for alleged "serious violations of discipline and laws" by the Central Commission for Discipline Inspection (CCDI), the party's internal disciplinary body, and the National Supervisory Commission, the highest anti-corruption agency of China.

Party political offices
Preceded by Liu Huijun	Communist Party Secretary of Kizilsu Kirghiz Autonomous Prefecture; 2017–2022	Succeeded by Wang Xuedong
