= Military-Industrial Commission of the Soviet Union =

The Military-Industrial Commission of the USSR or VPK (Russian: военно-промышленная комиссия, romanized: Voyenno-Promyshlennaya Komissiya) commission under the Council of Ministers of the USSR from 1957 to 1991. The VPK was a Commission of the Presidium of the Council of Ministers, and a deputy chairman of the Council headed it. The Soviet VPK's primary function was to facilitate plan fulfillment by easing bottlenecks, enforcing inter-ministerial cooperation, and overseeing the availability of resources.

The Soviet Union began military-industrial work before the Second World War. The Red Army sought control over Soviet industry in the 1920s during Lenin's reign, but Stalin actively prevented the formation of a military-industrial complex that could have challenged his power. He used a divide and rule strategy to prevent collusion between military and industrial factions. Although Stalin used the Soviet military command to execute forced industrialization and the transition to a planned economy, he also came to fear military and industrial leaders. The officials who proved to be too independent for his liking were purged. Heavy industry minister Sergo Ordzhonikidze was driven to suicide while General Mikhail Tukhachevsky was killed. New economic and military leaders emerged during WWII who were then humiliated, imprisoned, or killed. Furthermore, Stalin structured incentives so that military and industrial actors gained more from rivalry and cheating one another than from cooperation.

== History ==
On December 6, 1957, the Central Committee of the CPSU and the Council of Ministers of the USSR issued a joint resolution on the establishment of the Commission on Military-Industrial Issues under the Presidium of the Council of Ministers of the USSR. In 1957, in addition to the USSR Ministry of Defense, the Commission included representatives of the ministries of defense industries (MOOP) - medium mechanical engineering of the USSR, aviation industry of the USSR, defense industry of the USSR, general mechanical engineering of the USSR, radio industry of the USSR, communications industry of the USSR, shipbuilding industry of the USSR, electronic industry of the USSR, as well as the KGB under the CM of the USSR, the State Committee for the Use of Atomic Energy, the Main Directorate of State Material Reserves, the Main Technical Directorate of the State Committee for Foreign Economic Relations, Glavspetsstroy under Gosmontazhspetsstroy, organization P.O. Box No. 10, DOSAAF, the Central Committee "Dynamo" and the All-Army Military Hunting Society. The Chairman of the Military-Industrial Commission had at his disposal a secretariat, deputies, a Scientific and Technical Council, and an apparatus, which at different times consisted of 10-15 departments.

The Deputy Chairmen of the Military-Industrial Commission were vested with the rights of the First Deputy Minister of the USSR, and the heads of departments with the rights of a Deputy Minister of the USSR. The apparatus of the Military-Industrial Commission did not exceed 250 people.

The Scientific and Technical Council of the Military-Industrial Commission was headed for many years by Academician of the USSR Academy of Sciences A. N. Shchukin, who held the rank of Deputy Chairman of the Military-Industrial Commission. The Scientific and Technical Council of the Military-Industrial Commission consisted of 10-12 sections on the main problems of developing weapons and military equipment. They employed 200-250 members of the Scientific and Technical Council from the defense industry, research institutes of the USSR Ministry of Defense, the USSR Academy of Sciences, and higher educational institutions. One of the sections of the Scientific and Technical Council, which included academicians and corresponding members of the USSR Academy of Sciences, was officially called the "Presidium".

The decisions of the Military-Industrial Commission were mandatory for all ministries and departments developing and producing military products, regardless of their departmental subordination.

The Soviets had vested military-industrial interests in selling weapons, to the benefit of the Military-Industrial Commission. Odom describes its practices, making sure arms factories were kept in production by allowing the supply of every type of equipment requested by client states. Odom says a number of interested officials "profited personally from these sales." By the mid-1980s, Gorbachev was trying to de-escalate the Cold War, but instead the VPK were producing and exporting weapons as if the Cold War was actually escalating.

In 1985, the previously created commission was transformed into the State Commission of the Council of Ministers of the USSR on Military-Industrial Issues, and in 1991, into the State Military-Industrial Commission of the Cabinet of Ministers of the USSR.

== Tasks and responsibilities ==
- Organization and coordination of work on the creation of modern types of weapons and military equipment;

Coordination of the work of the defense industries, other ministries and departments of the USSR involved in the creation and production of weapons and military equipment;

- Ensuring, together with the USSR State Planning Committee, the comprehensive development of the defense industries;
- Increasing the technical level of production, quality and reliability of weapons and military equipment;
- Operational management and control over the activities of the defense industries, including in terms of the creation, production and supply of weapons and military equipment, the release of consumer goods and other civilian products in volumes equal in value to the wage fund of enterprises in the industry, as well as control over the activities of other industries on these issues;
- Preparation, together with the USSR State Planning Committee and the USSR Ministry of Defense, of armament programs, five-year and annual plans for the creation, production and release of weapons and military equipment and their submission for review and approval;
- Preparation and submission, jointly with the USSR State Planning Committee, the Ministries of Defense and Finance, for consideration by the USSR Defense Council and the Supreme Soviet of the USSR of proposals on control figures for the country's expenditure on the creation and production of weapons, military and other special equipment of defense significance in the relevant planning periods;
- Coordination of foreign economic relations of the defense industries on military-technical cooperation;
- Organization of the development and production of equipment for the processing industries of the agro-industrial complex, light industry and trade;
- Organization of the development and production of non-food consumer goods; organization of technical means and work in the field of communications; coordination of work on the creation of nuclear power facilities;
- Management of the implementation of programs for the electronization of the national economy; coordination of work in the field of air, freight and passenger transportation and other tasks.

== Organization ==
- Chairman of the Military-Industrial Complex — Deputy Chairman of the Council of Ministers of the USSR;
- First Deputy Chairman of the Military-Industrial Complex (with the rank of Minister of the USSR);
- Deputy Chairmen of the Military-Industrial Complex (with the rank of First Deputy Minister of the USSR);
- Heads of Departments of the Military-Industrial Complex (with the rank of Deputy Minister of the USSR)

Members of the Commission:

- First Deputy Chairman of the USSR State Planning Committee for the Military-Industrial Complex;
- First Deputy Minister of Medium Machine Building of the USSR;
- First Deputy Minister of the Aviation Industry of the USSR;
- First Deputy Minister of the Defense Industry of the USSR;
- First Deputy Minister of General Machine Building of the USSR;
- First Deputy Minister of the Radio Industry of the USSR;
- First Deputy Minister of the Communications Industry of the USSR;
- First Deputy Minister of the Shipbuilding Industry of the USSR;
- First Deputy Minister of the Electronic Industry of the USSR.
- Chief of the General Staff of the USSR Armed Forces — First Deputy Minister of Defense of the USSR;
- First Deputy Chairman of the KGB of the USSR;
- Chairman of the State Customs Committee of the USSR — Deputy Minister of Defense of the USSR;
- Deputy Minister of Defense of the USSR for armaments;

== Chairmen of the VPK ==
- 1957-63: Dmitriy Ustinov
- 1963-85: Leonid Smirnov
- 1985-1988, 1991: Yuri Maslyukov
- 1988-1990: Igor Belousov

== See also ==
- Ministry of Defense Industry (Soviet Union)
- Ministry of Armaments (Soviet Union)
- Military-Industrial Commission of Russia
- State Military-Industrial Committee of Belarus
