= State Military-Industrial Committee of Belarus =

- Дзяржаўны ваенна-прамысловы камітэт Рэспублікі Беларусь
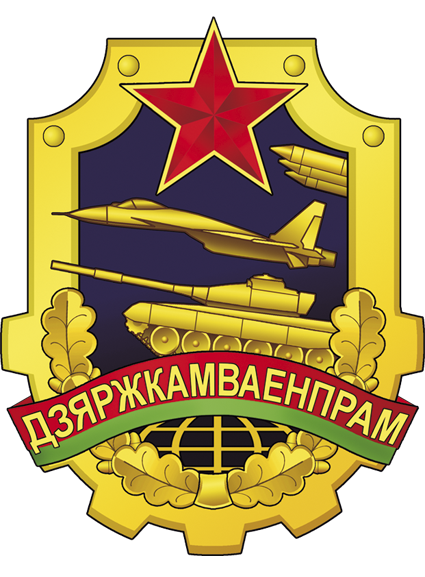
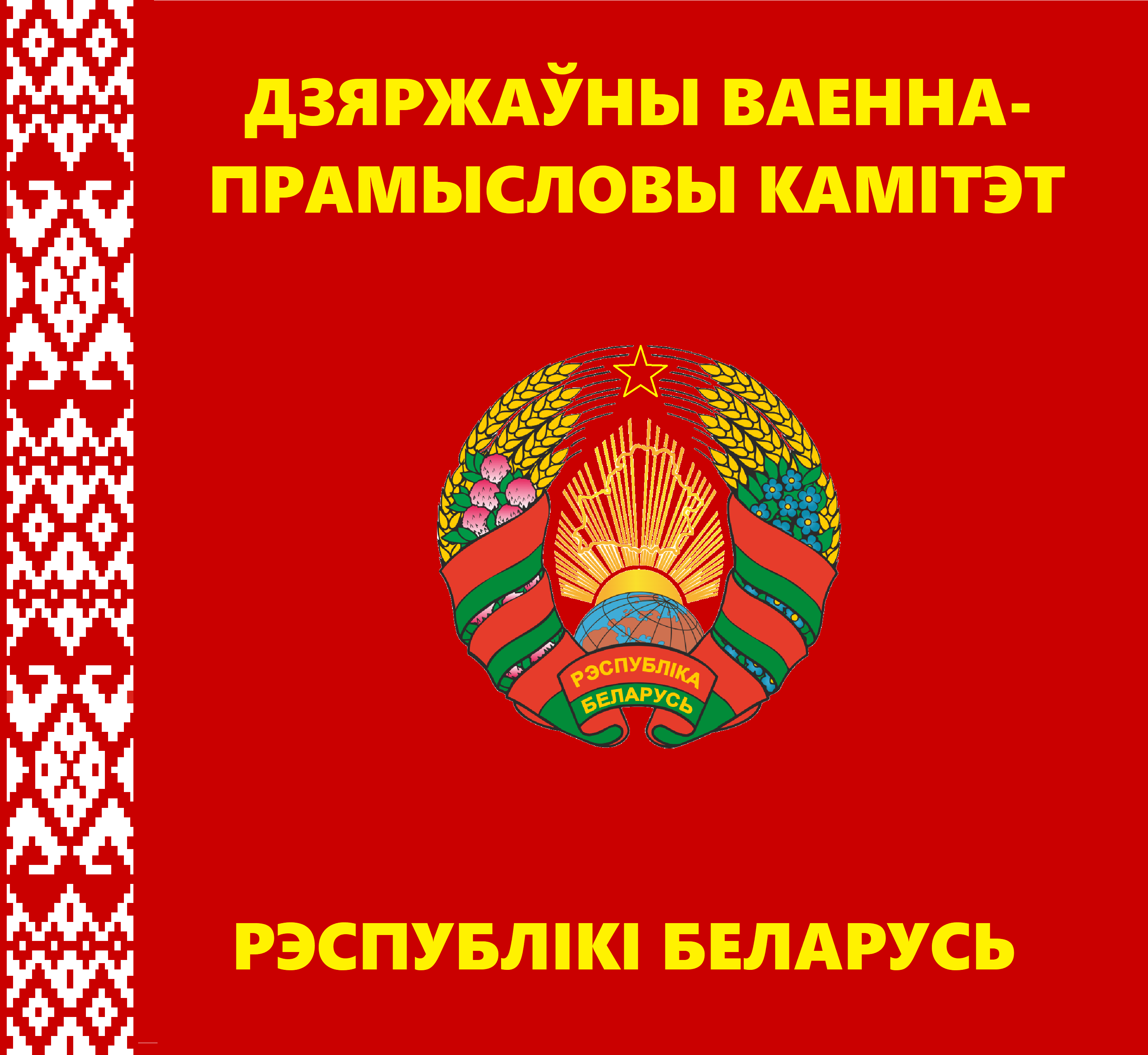
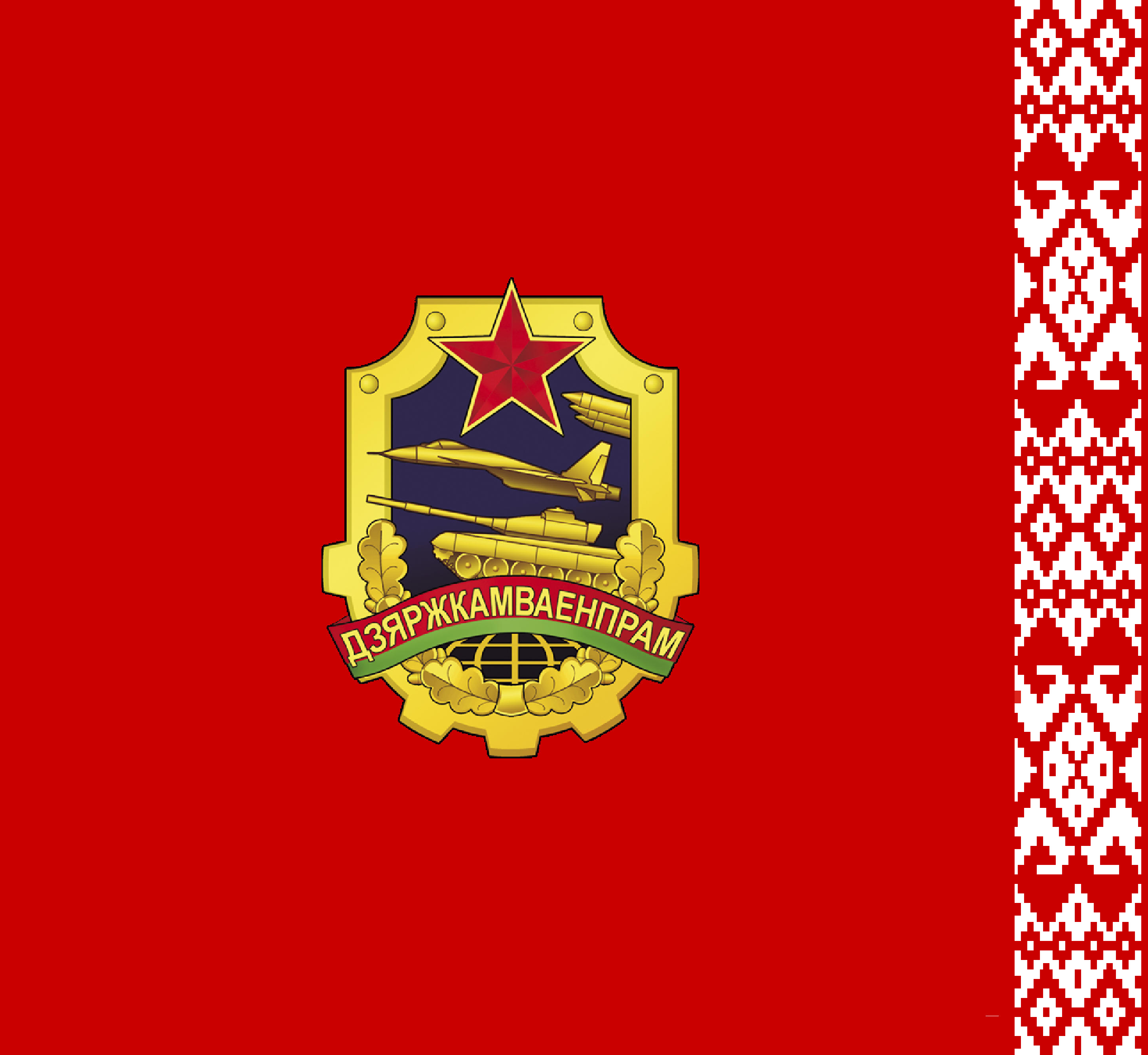
- Emblem and both sides of the flag of the State-Military Industrial Committee of Belarus

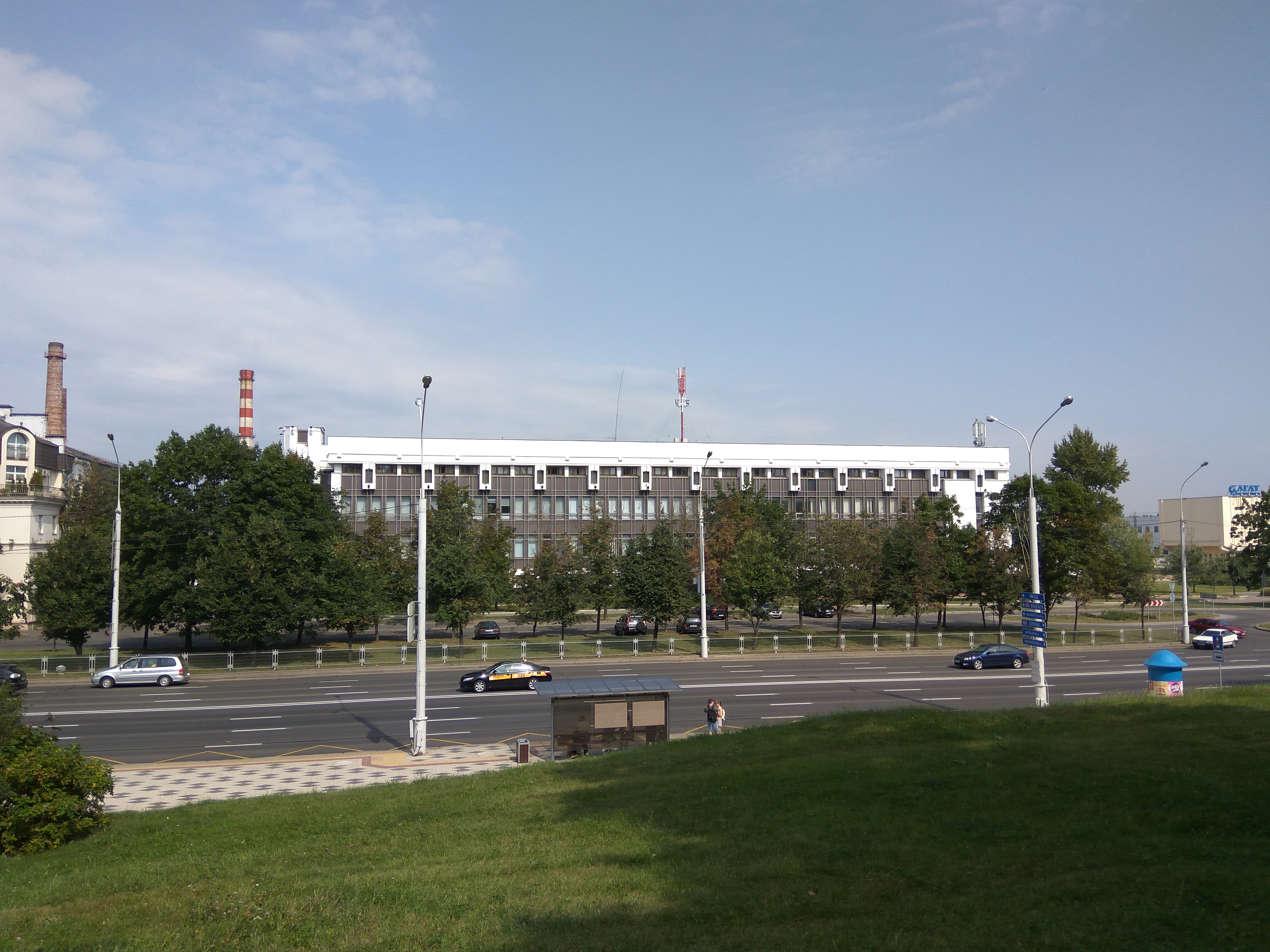

Agency overview
- Formed: 30 December 2003
- Preceding agency: Military-Industrial Commission of the Soviet Union
- Jurisdiction: Belarus
- Headquarters: Minsk
- Agency executive: Dzmitry Pantus, Chairman

The State Military-Industrial Committee of Belarus (Belarusian: Дзяржаўны ваенна-прамысловы камітэт Рэспублікі Беларусь, romanized: Dziaržaŭny vajenna-pramyslovy kamitet Respubliki Bielaruś; Russian: Государственный военно-промышленный комитет Республики Беларусь) is a body that is dealing with national security and defense capability of the state, the implementation of its innovation and foreign economic policy. The Committee was created with the aim of implementing a unified policy in the field of defense, development and strengthening of military-technical cooperation of Belarus with other foreign countries. The decree on the establishment of the State Military-Industrial Committee was issued on December 30, 2003, on the initiative of the President of the Republic of Belarus.

On June 4, 2020, Dzmitry Pantus was appointed Chairman of the Committee.

Due to Russia's invasion of Ukraine, the Military-Industrial Committee of the Republic of Belarus is under sanctions from all EU countries, the United States, Great Britain and a number of other countries.

== Export ==
The main buyer is Russia. Thus, in 2018, the trade turnover between Belarus and the Russian Federation in the military sphere amounted to 600 million dollars, and exports from the republic exceeded Russian imports. Large consignments were shipped to Azerbaijan, Sudan, Myanmar, Angola, Nigeria and Vietnam. Key buyers also include Kazakhstan, China, Laos, Indonesia, Bangladesh, India, the United Arab Emirates and Uganda. The bulk of exports are electronic warfare and air defense systems and components for military equipmentе. In addition, army aviation repair services are provided. Countries such as Serbia, Bulgaria and Slovakia regularly purchase Belarusian ammunition. In the SIPRI list of world arms exporters for 2020, Belarus ranked 19th out of 25. The total volume of supplies from the world total is only 0.3%. Compared to the level of arms exports in 2011-2015, the figure has significantly decreased - by 34%. The main recipients of weapons exported from Belarus are named as such countries as Vietnam (26% of the total volume), Serbia (about 16%) and Sudan (exactly 13%).

== International Sanctions ==
Following Russia's 2022 invasion of Ukraine, "in response to Belarus's significant facilitation and support of Russia's invasion of Ukraine and support for Russia's armed forces," the committee, its chairman Pantus, and many Belarusian military-industrial enterprises were included in the United States list of specially designated nationals and blocked persons.

In the spring of 2022, Canada added the committee to Canada's sanctions list of "associates of the Lukashenko regime" for "facilitating President Putin's invasion of a free and sovereign country."

For similar reasons, the committee was sanctioned by the United Kingdom, New Zealand, Japan, Australia and Ukraine. The above-mentioned countries, in addition to Japan, also added Vyacheslav Rossolai, deputy chairman of the committee, to the sanctions list.

On 3 June 2022, the committee was included in the EU sanctions list; Switzerland subsequently joined these sanctions. In June 2023, the EU and Switzerland joined sanctions against Pantus, and in December against Rossolai and Oleg Mishchenko, the first deputy chairman of the committee. On 9 August 2024, Canada joined the sanctions against Mishchenko.
