= Military-Industrial Commission of Russia =

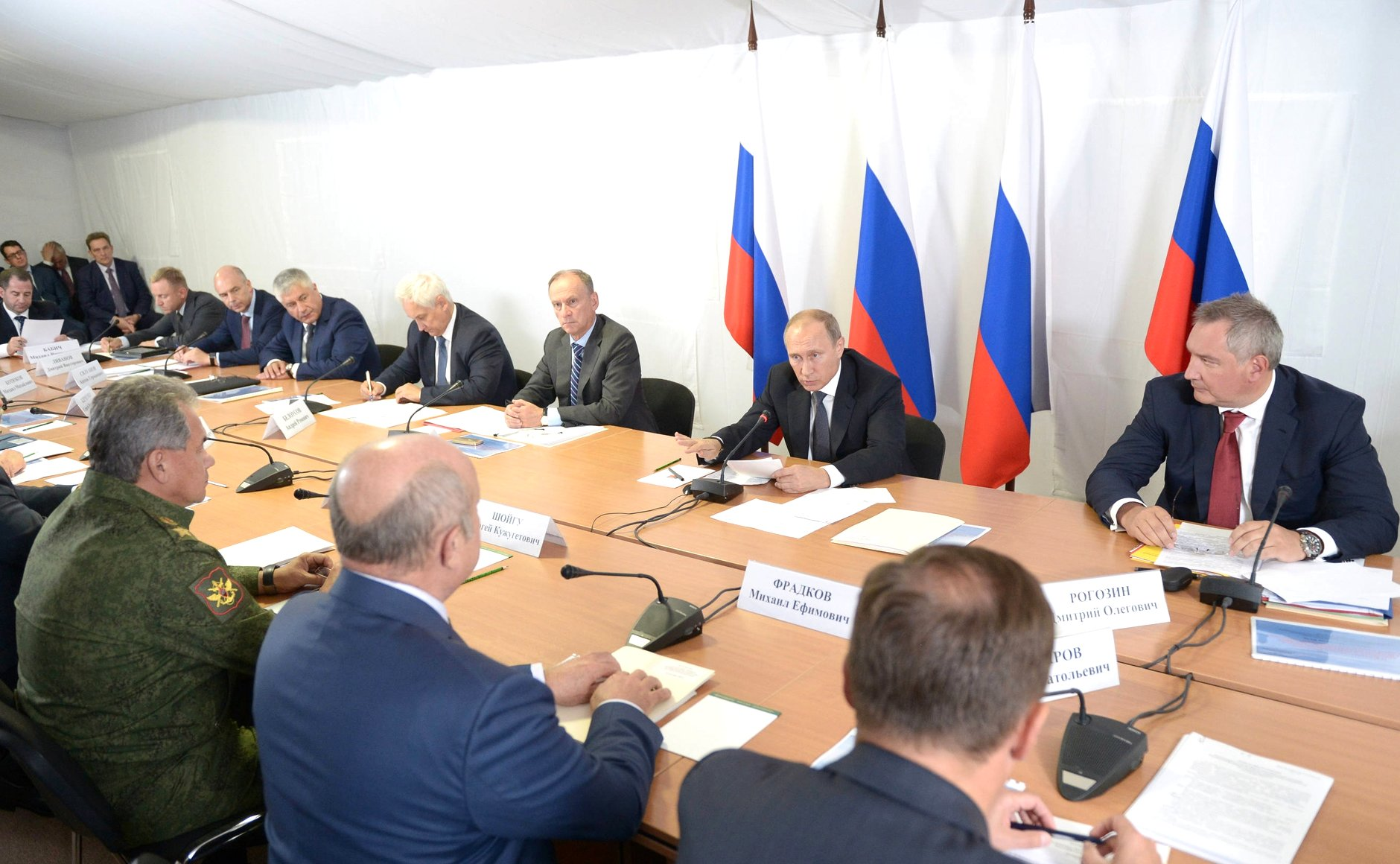
A meeting of the commission on 19 September 2015

The Military-Industrial Commission of the Russian Federation (Russian: Военно-промышленная комиссия Российской Федерации (acronym VPK)) was established by a presidential decree in March 2006. According to the decree, it is a permanently functioning body with vast responsibilities for supervising the distribution and implementation of the "State defence order". The commission answers directly to the President of Russia. It coordinates between the Defence Ministry of the Russian Federation, the Armed Forces of the Russian Federation, and the defence industry of Russia. Until then, the defence industry was supervised by Russia's Ministry of Industry and Energy, as well as by the previous government consultative body with a similar name.

The VPK of the Russian Federation was a slightly reorientated Military-Industrial Commission of the Soviet Union, which served as a central management body for the Soviet defence industry. The VPK was an inner circle of the Council of Ministers, and the first deputy chairman of the Council headed it. The Soviet VPK's primary function was to facilitate plan fulfilment by easing bottlenecks, enforcing inter-ministerial cooperation, and overseeing the availability of resources.

== Commission members ==
The makeup of the Commission is determined by Presidential Decree 628 of 2014, as modified on various dates.

=== 2018 ===
This is the 2018 commission.

Member	Position
Vladimir Putin	President of the Russian Federation (chairman of the commission)
Dmitry Rogozin	Deputy Prime Minister of Russia (deputy chairman of the commission, chairman of the Board of the commission)
Yury Borisov	Deputy Minister of Defence of the Russian Federation (executive secretary of the commission)
Igor Artemyev	Head of the Federal Antimonopoly Service
Andrey Belousov	Aide to the President of the Russian Federation
Alexander Bortnikov	Director of the Federal Security Service (FSB)
Valery Gerasimov	Chief of the General Staff of the Armed Forces of the Russian Federation – First Deputy Minister of Defence of the Russian Federation
Viktor Zolotov	Director of the Federal Service of the National Guard Troops of the Russian Federation – Commander-in-Chief of the National Guard Troops of the Russian Federation
Vladimir Kozhin	Aide to the President of the Russian Federation
Vladimir Kolokoltsev	Minister of Internal Affairs of the Russian Federation
Igor Komarov	General Director of Roscosmos
Alexey Likhachev	General director of the State Atomic Energy Corporation (Rosatom)
Denis Manturov	Minister of Industry and Trade of the Russian Federation
Sergey Naryshkin	Director of the Foreign Intelligence Service
Maxim Oreshkin	Minister of Economic Development of the Russian Federation
Nikolai Patrushev	Secretary of the Security Council of Russia
Anton Siluanov	Minister of Finance of the Russian Federation
Sergey Chemezov	General director of Rostec
Sergei Shoigu	Minister of Defence of the Russian Federation

== Board members ==
The make-up of the board is also determined by Presidential Decree 628 of 2014, as modified on various dates.

== 2018 ==
This is the 2018 board.

Member	Position
Dmitry Rogozin	Deputy Chairman of the Government of the Russian Federation (deputy chairman of the commission, chairman of the Board of the commission)
Ivan Kharchenko	First Deputy Chairman of the Board of the Military-Industrial Commission of the Russian Federation
Oleg Bochkarev	Deputy Chairman of the Board of the Military-Industrial Commission of the Russian Federation
Yury Mikhailov	Chairman of the Scientific and Technical Council of the Military-Industrial Commission of the Russian Federation – Deputy Chairman of the Board of the Military-Industrial Commission of the Russian Federation
Igor Borovkov	Chief of Staff of the Board of the Military-Industrial Commission of the Russian Federation – Deputy Chief of Staff of the Government of the Russian Federation
Yury Borisov	Deputy Minister of Defence of the Russian Federation (executive secretary of the commission)
Yuri Averyanov	First Deputy Secretary of the Security Council of Russia
Alexey Alyoshin	Head of Rostekhnadzor
A. M. Antonov	Deputy General Director of the Joint-Stock Company "St. Petersburg Marine Engineering Bureau "Malakhit"", General Designer (subject to agreement)
Vladimir Artyakov	First Deputy General Director of the State Corporation for Assistance to the Development, Production and Export of High-Tech Industrial Products "Rostec"
N. F. Arkhipov	Director of the Department of Defence Industry of the Executive Office of the Government of the Russian Federation
Viktor Bondarev	Chairman of the Federation Council Committee on Defence and Security (subject to agreement)
S. P. Bulavin	Member of the Board of the Military-Industrial Commission of the Russian Federation
S. G. Garanin	Deputy Director of the Federal State Unitary Enterprise "Russian Federal Nuclear Center – All-Russian Research Institute of Experimental Physics" for laser physics, General Designer (subject to agreement)
Dmitry Gogin	Head of Rosrezerv
Leonid Gornin	Deputy Minister of Finance of the Russian Federation
Andrey Grigoryev	Director General of the Foundation for Advanced Research Projects
Ivan Kamenskikh	First Deputy Director General of the State Atomic Energy Corporation Rosatom
S. N. Karutin	Deputy General Director – Head of the Information and Analytical Center for Coordinate-Temporal and Navigation Support of the Federal State Unitary Enterprise "Central Research Institute of Mechanical Engineering", General Designer (subject to agreement)
M. I. Kashtan	Member of the Board of the Military-Industrial Commission of the Russian Federation
S. N. Kozlov	Head of the FSB Center of Russia, General Designer
Igor Komarov	Director General of Roscosmos
Sergey Korotkov	Vice President of the United Aircraft Corporation, General Designer (subject to agreement)
Mikhail Kotyukov	Head of the Federal Agency for Scientific Organizations of Russia
I. Yu. Krylov	Deputy General Director of the Joint-Stock Company "St. Petersburg Marine Engineering Bureau "Malakhit"", General Designer (subject to agreement)
A. L. Linets	Head of the State Unitary Enterprise
Yuri Maevsky	Deputy General Director of the Joint-Stock Company "Concern Radioelectronic Technologies", General Designer (subject to agreement)
O. V. Martyanov	Member of the Board of the Military-Industrial Commission of the Russian Federation
A. A. Medvedev	Deputy General Director for Projects and Programs of the United Rocket and Space Corporation, General Designer (subject to agreement)
Yevgeny Mikrin	General Designer – First Deputy General Director of the Public Joint-Stock Company "Rocket and Space Corporation Energia named after S. P. Korolev" (subject to agreement)
S. I. Mileiko	Deputy Director of the Russian National Guard – Commander-in-Chief of the National Guard Troops of the Russian Federation
A. M. Moryakov	Deputy Director of the Foreign Intelligence Service of Russia
Nikolay Nikiforov	Minister of Communications and Mass Media of the Russian Federation
M. A. Ovchinnikov	Deputy Head of the Federal Antimonopoly Service of Russia
N. S. Pavlenko	

== Gunsmith Day ==
19 September marks Gunsmith Day (Russian: День оружейника), the professional holiday for the commission and the forces under its jurisdiction. It was celebrated for the first time in 2010, following a visit in May of that year to the hometown of Mikhail Kalashnikov by Vladimir Putin. 19 September was chosen for this holiday, because the Russian Orthodox Church honors the memory of Saint Michael the Taxiarch on this day.

== Journal "Defence of Russia" ==
The magazine Oborona Rossii or Defence of Russia is the official printed organ of the Military-Industrial Commission and has been published since October 2008. The publication covers the activities of the commission and publishes materials related to the issues and activities of the military-industrial complex of Russia.

== See also ==
- Military-Industrial Commission of the USSR
- Security Council of Russia
- Federal Service for Defence Contracts (Rosoboronzakaz)
