= List of ambassadors of Russia to Denmark =

Ambassador of the Russian Federation to the Kingdom of Denmark
- Emblem of the Russian Foreign Ministry
- Incumbent; Vladimir Barbin since 12 December 2018
- Ministry of Foreign Affairs; Embassy of Russia in Copenhagen
- Style: His Excellency; The Honourable
- Reports to: Minister of Foreign Affairs
- Seat: Copenhagen
- Appointer: President of Russia
- Term length: At the pleasure of the president
- Website: Embassy of the Russian Federation in the Kingdom of Denmark

The ambassador extraordinary and plenipotentiary of the Russian Federation to the Kingdom of Denmark is the official representative of the president and the government of the Russian Federation to the prime minister and the government of Denmark.

The ambassador and his staff work at large in the Embassy of Russia in Copenhagen. The post of Russian ambassador to Denmark is currently held by Vladimir Barbin, incumbent since 12 December 2018.

== History of diplomatic relations ==
Diplomatic exchanges between Russia and Denmark date back to the fifteenth century, with the signing of a mutual assistance pact in 1493 between the Grand Duchy of Moscow and the Kingdom of Denmark. In 1700 a permanent diplomatic mission of the Tsardom of Russia was established in Denmark in 1700, and in 1893, during the period of the Russian Empire, representation was upgraded to the level of embassies.

Despite the disruption to international relations caused by the Russian Revolution in 1917, diplomatic contacts were quickly established between the nascent Russian Soviet Federative Socialist Republic, with the appointment of Vatslav Vorovsky as diplomatic representative to the Scandinavian countries of Denmark, Sweden and Norway. Vorovsky's appointment was shortlived, as countries began withdrawing diplomatic recognition of envoys from the Soviet state, and there followed a period without representation until the appointment in 1923 of Tsezar Geyn as representative of the Soviet Union to Denmark. It was during Geyn's tenure that on 18 June 1924 the Soviet mission was officially established in Denmark, with Geyn serving as the officially accredited representative. Representation continued at the level of missions throughout the German invasion and occupation of Denmark in 1940, until the Axis invasion of the Soviet Union in June 1941. In April 1944 the Soviet Union established contacts and assigned a representative to the clandestine Danish Freedom Council.

Relations between the Soviet Union and Denmark were resumed after the war in May 1945, with the appointment of Andrey Plakhin as envoy. Relations were upgraded to the level of embassies in August 1955, and following the dissolution of the Soviet Union in 1991, ambassadors have continued to be exchanged between the Kingdom of Denmark and the Russian Federation.

== List of representatives (1658–present) ==
=== Tsardom of Russia to the Kingdom of Denmark (1700–1720) ===
Name	Title	Appointment	Termination	Notes
Andrey Izmaylov	Envoy	August 1700	4 September 1707	
Vasily Dolgorukov	Envoy	4 September 1707	17 July 1720	

=== Russian Empire to the Kingdom of Denmark (1721–1917) ===
Name	Title	Appointment	Termination	Notes
Alexey Bestuzhev-Ryumin	Resident	1721	1731	
Kazimir Brakel	Minister Plenipotentiary	1 February 1731	28 November 1734	
Alexey Bestuzhev-Ryumin	Resident	1734	1740	
Johann Korff	Envoy	27 March 1740	18 February 1741	
Piotr Chernyshev	Envoy	18 February 1741	31 October 1741	
Johann Korff	Envoy	18 February 1741	23 January 1746	
Aleksey Pushkin	Envoy	23 January 1746	31 May 1747	
Nikita Panin	Envoy	1747	1748	
Johann Korff	Envoy	31 January 1748	27 March 1766	
Mikhail Filosofov	Envoy	1766	1770	
Ivan Mestmakher	Comptroller of Mission	27 June 1770	November 1772	
Ivan Simolin	Envoy	1772	1774	
Karl Osten-Saken	Envoy	1775	1784	
Andrey Razumovsky	Envoy	1784	May 1786	
Aleksey Kridener	Envoy	1786	1794	
Ivan Shtakelberg	Envoy	1794	1797	
Rodion Koshelev	Envoy	30 April 1797	24 October 1798	
Ivan Muravyov-Apostol	Minister-Resident	1799	1800	
Vasily Lizakevich	Envoy	13 September 1800	14 October 1815	
Isaak van Brinen	Chargé d'affaires	1815	1816	
Pavel Nikolai	Envoy	13 May 1816	30 April 1847	
Ernest Ungern-Shternberg	Envoy	17 August 1847	7 November 1860	
Nikolai Nikolai	Envoy	7 November 1860	2 October 1867	
Arthur von Mohrenheim	Envoy	2 October 1867	13 July 1882	
Karl Tol	Envoy	13 July 1882	2 February 1893	
Mikhail Muravyov	Ambassador	14 February 1893	1 January 1897	
Alexander von Benckendorff	Ambassador	4 February 1897	1902	
Alexander Izvolsky	Ambassador	24 October 1902	20 April 1906	
Ivan Kudashev	Ambassador	1906	20 September 1910	
Karlos von Buxhoeveden	Ambassador	1910	3 March 1917	

=== Russian Provisional Government to the Kingdom of Denmark (1917) ===
Name	Title	Appointment	Termination	Notes
Matvey Sevastopulo	Envoy	3 June 1917	26 October 1917	

=== Russian Soviet Federative Socialist Republic to the Kingdom of Denmark (1917–1919) ===
Name	Title	Appointment	Termination	Notes
Vatslav Vorovsky	Diplomatic Representative	November 1917	1919	

=== Soviet Union to the Kingdom of Denmark (1923–1991) ===
Name	Title	Appointment	Termination	Notes
Tsezar Geyn	Diplomatic Representative	1923	20 November 1924	
Mikhail Kobetsky	Plenipotentiary	10 December 1924	1 July 1933	
Fyodor Raskolnikov	Plenipotentiary	1 July 1933	31 August 1934	
Nikolai Tikhmenev	Plenipotentiary	21 September 1934	1 January 1938	
Ivan Vlasov	Chargé d'affaires	1939	22 June 1941	
Diplomatic relations interrupted (1941 - 1945)
Andrey Plakhin	Envoy	22 June 1945	15 July 1950	
Mikhail Vetrov	Envoy	15 July 1950	3 June 1954	
Ivan Sysoev	Envoy	3 June 1954	19 July 1955	
Nikolai Slavin	Envoy; Ambassador after 16 September 1955	19 July 1955	9 September 1958	
Kliment Lyovychkin	Ambassador	7 December 1958	18 February 1966	
Ivan Ilyichev	Ambassador	18 February 1966	16 November 1968	
Aleksandr Orlov	Ambassador	16 November 1968	3 July 1969	
Nikolai Yegorychev	Ambassador	18 April 1970	18 May 1984	
Lev Mendelevich	Ambassador	18 May 1984	12 March 1986	
Boris Pastukhov	Ambassador	12 March 1986	15 September 1989	
Gennady Vedernikov	Ambassador	11 October 1989	13 December 1991	

=== Russian Federation to the Kingdom of Denmark (1991–present) ===
Name	Title	Appointment	Termination	Notes
Alexey Obukhov	Ambassador	22 April 1992	25 November 1996	
Aleksandr Chepurin	Ambassador	25 November 1996	15 December 1999	
Nikolay Bordyuzha	Ambassador	21 December 1999	16 April 2003	
Dmitry Rurikov	Ambassador	1 August 2003	14 September 2007	
Teimuraz Ramishvili	Ambassador	14 September 2007	6 April 2012	
Mikhail Vanin	Ambassador	6 April 2012	12 December 2018	
Vladimir Barbin	Ambassador	12 December 2018		
