= Fairness of the 2008 Russian presidential election =

The fairness of the 2008 Russian presidential election is disputed, with election monitoring groups giving conflicting reports. Most official reports accept that not all candidates had equal media coverage and that some election monitoring groups had restricted access to perform their role. Monitoring groups found a number of other irregularities, but made no official reports of fraud or ballot stuffing.

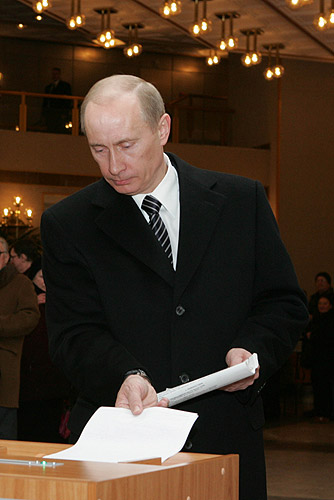
Vladimir Putin voting in the election

== Opinions of observers and Election officials ==
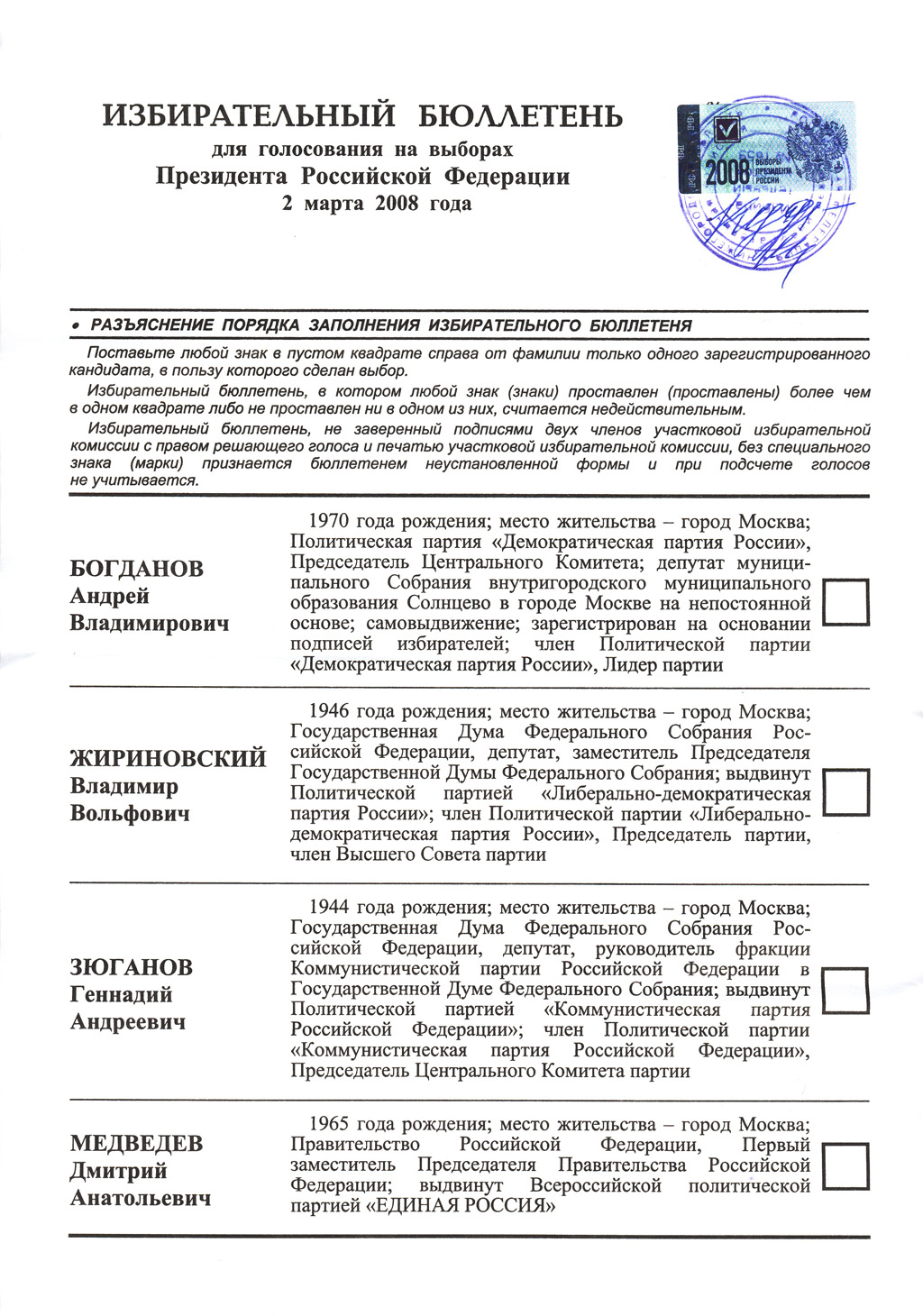
Ballot

=== GOLOS Association ===
Representatives from the GOLOS monitoring group stated that "the Election Day was held in a relatively quiet atmosphere in contrast to the State Duma election day. Such large-scale violations observed then as campaigning next to polling stations, transporting of voters, intimidation of voters and others were practically non-existent." They did however report irregularities in the election. Some of the more serious irregularities reported were:

- Incomplete combined protocols, as in 50% of polling stations in Ufa, Kostroma and Kursk
- Some voters being allowed keep their absentee ballots (e.g. at 41% of polling stations in V. Novgorod and at about 5% of polling stations in Tomsk, Kazan, Yekaterinburg and Ufa)
- Massive voting with absentee ballots was reported from almost 10% of polling stations in the Republic of Mariy-El, at 7% of polling stations in Tatarstan, at 9% of polling stations in Irkutsk and at 4.5% of polling stations in Yekaterinburg
- Various government officials other than members of electoral commissions were reported at polling stations especially in Omsk (30.6% of polling stations), but in other regions as well (at 5-6% of polling stations in Barnaul, Adygea, Yekaterinburg, Yoshkar-Ola, Perm and Pskov)

=== Commonwealth of Independent States observer mission ===
The Commonwealth of Independent States observer mission said the election was free and democratic. "The CIS observer mission states that the election is a major factor in the further democratization of public life in the Russian Federation, and recognizes it as free, open and transparent," said Nauryz Aidarov, head of the CIS mission.

=== Council of Europe ===
The Parliamentary Assembly of the Council of Europe observer delegation was the only Western organization to monitor the election, with other Western organizations citing alleged restrictions imposed by Russia making it "impossible for them to capture an accurate picture of campaigning."

The PACE delegation concluded that no election fraud or major violations took place and that its outcome broadly reflected the will of the people, but said that not all candidates had equal media coverage. Andreas Gross, the head of the 22-member observation mission, denounced the process, saying "It is still not free and still not fair."

The PACE observing group stated that the result of the election was a "reflection of the will of an electorate whose democratic potential was, unfortunately, not tapped." They said "In the elections, which had more the character of a plebiscite on the last eight years in this country, the people of Russia voted for the stability and continuity associated with the incumbent President and the candidate promoted by him. The President-elect will have a solid mandate given to him by the majority of Russians." Chairman Andreas Gross said there had been "uneven access" to the media during the campaign, a claim made by two of the candidates, who complained of overwhelming bias towards Medvedev by state television. He also "lamented" the absence of independent candidates in the poll, such as Mikhail Kasyanov, who he said were "deliberately excluded" from the race.

The group had concerns over candidate registration and concluded that unfair access to media put into question the overall fairness of the vote. According to the group, the election "repeated most of the flaws revealed during the Duma elections of December 2007." A pre-election PACE mission found one month earlier that voters had limited choice. The mission pointed to "insurmountable difficulties" facing candidates willing to register. According to the mission, "an election where there is not a level playing field for all contestants can hardly be considered as fair."

A "post-electoral" delegation from PACE, following a visit which came after widespread demonstrations in Moscow and elsewhere, called for political change in Russia, adding that it should be "substantial and sustainable", and should not be "a survival mechanism".

== Organization for Security and Cooperation in Europe ==
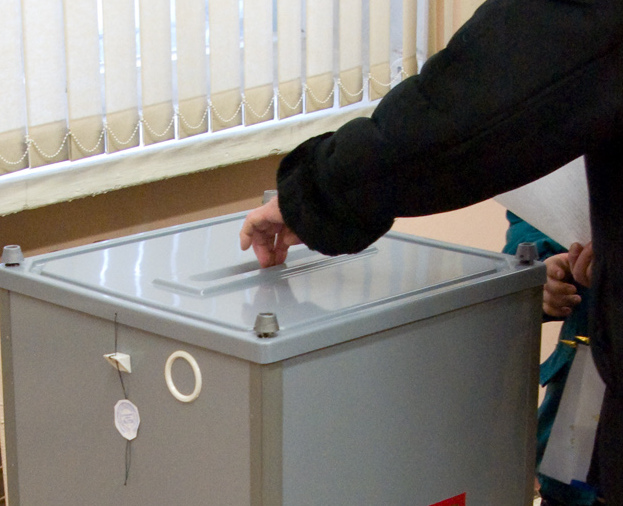
Voter places their ballot in a ballot box

The Organization for Security and Cooperation in Europe boycotted the election because of what it called "severe restrictions" on its observers by the Russian government. After weeks of negotiations, Russia agreed to increase the observer numbers for the ODIHR mission and extend the time frame for its visit, but the ODIHR claimed that the offer still didn't meet their requirements, insisting that it needed to send at least 50 of its observers to Russia on February 15, five days before the date proposed by Moscow, in order effectively monitor the election campaign. Russia responded by insisting that it was complying fully with its international obligations and that its invitation for 400 monitors meets international standards. It accused the OSCE of attempting to politicize the dispute and that it suspected ODIHR's intention from the outset was to boycott the election, saying that the ODIHR had displayed "contempt for basic ethical norms ... which, it seems, indicates that ODIHR from the start was not even trying to agree on mutually acceptable conditions for monitoring."

== Members of European Union ==
Germany and France made clear the vote did not meet their criteria for a democratic election, but alongside Britain and the European Union they congratulated Medvedev on a victory they said appeared to reflect the will of the Russian people.

== Russian reaction ==
Pro-Putin youth organization Nashi decided to sue the Parliamentary Assembly of the Council of Europe and Organization for Security and Cooperation in Europe for libel "hurting reputation of the Russian Federation". They filed lawsuits in the courts of Russia, Ukraine, Georgia and Moldova. So far only the Leninsky Raion Court of Sevastopol, Ukraine decided that PACE and OCSE are guilty in libel and fined them ₴30 million (approximately US$6 Million). Nashi threatened to demand confiscation of European property in the Post-Soviet states if the decision of the Ukrainian court will be ignored. According to Maksim Novikov and Leonid Rayevsky of Nezavisimaya Gazeta, PACE removed their December 3, 2007 statement on Russian Elections following the court decision. PACE criticized organizers of the earlier State Duma elections in its December 3, 2007 statement.

=== Election officials ===
The head of Russian Central Elections Commission (CEC) Vladimir Churov said that no serious violations occurred in the presidential election campaign - "There were no serious violations in the canvassing campaign, and each candidate had broad possibilities to present his program and views". He also said that media coverage for the presidential election had been "fair but not equal".

Prior to the election, head of the International Affairs Committee at the State Duma, Konstantin Kosachyov, criticized Parliamentary Assembly of the Council of Europe chairman Andreas Gross for making statements that could affect voter behavior before the election results are known, calling his statements "an attempt to exert pressure on our country and our people through the international monitoring procedure".

== Opinion of candidates ==
=== Dmitry Medvedev ===
The winner of the elections, Dmitry Medvedev said:

"The unprecedented level of the electoral activity is evidence that our citizens care about our country's future. Thank them very much for their participation in the electoral campaign: elections of the President of Russia."

=== Gennady Zyuganov ===
Presidential candidate Gennady Zyuganov, who gathered 17.7% of the vote, says that

"falsification of the results to achieve the required percentage reached fantastic proportions ... According to the Communist Party (CPRF) observers, Zyuganov got 23%-24% of the vote in the Russian Far East, more than 30% in Bryansk Oblast, etc. When the electoral offices got the command to achieve Medvedev's results slightly less than Putin's on the 2004 election a Bacchanalia began. In twenty regions the electronic equipment was switched off and there were attempts to rewrite the protocols. It didn't go smoothly everywhere but in many places it worked. The president of Bashkortostan lowered Zyuganov's vote to below 7% while on all the districts there CPRF observers were present the result was 23%-24%. A similar pattern was observed in Tatarstan, Ingushetia, Mordovia. The special case was Chechnya. In Oryol Oblast (the birthplace of Zyuganov) up to 30% of Zyuganov's ballots were intentionally made invalid and thrown to the rubbish bin. Electoral observers from CPRF there were asked to leave the voting place for 5-10 minutes for the "special actions" with the ballots, otherwise the results would not be accepted by the electoral commission"

=== Vladimir Zhirinovsky ===
Presidential candidate Vladimir Zhirinovsky who got 9.3% of the vote emphasized that the elections were the

"historical moment when the first time in the history of Russia the power goes from one human to another according to the Constitution, the laws on the legislative and presidential elections. We have waited this for one hundred years. For one hundred years our country did not see a peaceful transfer of powers!"

=== Mikhail Kasyanov ===
Dismissed presidential candidate Mikhail Kasyanov stated on the election day:

"I do not care what the numbers: 60, 70 or 120 percent will be officially announced. Today is the day of completion for the KGB operation on illegitimate transfer of power".
"Today are funerals of democracy in Russia, but it died earlier: between December and January when the Government violated the fundamental constitutional right of citizens: the right for a free election, free choice and the possibility to elect their own candidates rather than the ones enforced from above."

According to Kasyanov, NTV and other media intentionally lied to people about the Central Electoral Commission finding 60 thousand counterfeit signatures in his presidency bid. He says that despite very strong pressure by the local FSB and police in many Russian regions put on the people signing Kasyanovs bid to give false evidence of forgery, out of more than 2 million signatures only 170 were found to be made by different people. The rest of the contested signatures were related to minor technical problems with the gathered documents.

== Opinions of the media and political analysts ==
=== Statistical analysis of the election reports ===
Russian programmer Shpilkin analyzed the results of Medvedev's election statistically and came to a conclusion that the results were falsified by the election committees. However, after the correction for the falsification factor the Medvedev still came out as a winner, although with less impressive numbers. Shpilkin's analysis revealed typical statistics (for example Gaussian distribution of the percent of votes for the whole sample of voting stations) for all presidential candidates except for Medvedev. In case of Medvedev, statistical distributions were highly abnormal. Namely, there was a clear correlation between the reported voting attendance and the percent of votes for Medvedev, with spikes of votes for Medvedev at the round voting attendance numbers (85, 90, 95, 100%) and an enormous peak for the unrealistic, but numerous 100% attendance. Shpilkin concluded that these extra votes for Medvedev were either added by the election officials or resulted from the voting of the state employees commanded to vote in a certain way. After Shpilkin subtracted the extra votes, Medvedev still lead the elections, but with 63% of votes instead of 70%.

Vladimir Kozlov and Dmitry Oreshkin analysed results from the polling stations that used electronic ballot counting systems (KOIB or kompleksy po obrabotke izbiratelnykh bulletney, complexes for processing of electoral ballots) and the polling stations that utilized manual counting of ballots. In Moscow on the polling stations with automatic ballot counting the average participations was 57.3% with 65.9% out of this number voting for Dmitri Medvedev. In the polling stations with manual processing of ballots the participation was 70.5% with 75.3% voting for Dmitri Medvedev. The similar results were obtained for other Russian regions. Moreover, some polling stations used automatic ballot processing for 2008 Russian presidential election but manual processing for 2007 Russian legislative election registered significant shift from the winning candidate towards the opposition while all the stations that used automatic processing for the legislative elections but manual for the presidential elections registered a dramatic shift in support for the winning candidates. According to the authors the data prove a significant manipulations (about ten percent) on the polling station in support for Dmitri Medvedev and the United Russia. According to the head of Russian Central Elections Commission (CEC) Vladimir Churov in future the Election Commission would use only manual ballot processing.

=== Political analysts ===
Former Putin's economic policy adviser Andrey Illarionov demanded to recognize these elections as a special operation and a fabrication.

=== Western Press ===
The Economist reported that Mr Medvedev has been mentioned over six times more often than his three rivals in 1,000 different news sources, according to figures from SCAN, a media database owned by Interfax, but stated that this could be due to Medvedev's high-profile job as chairman of the state-owned gas monopoly, Gazprom.

A report by the International Herald Tribune described Medvedev's election as "the culmination of Putin's efforts to consolidate control over the government, business and the news media since taking office eight years ago."

Prior to the election, British news outlet The Guardian quoted Marina Dashenkova of the GOLOS Association, Renat Suleymanov of the Communist party in Novosibirsk, Vladimir Bespalov of the Vladivostok parliament and others accusing the Russian government of pressuring government employees and students to vote. In another report they painted Medvedev as a "clone" of Mr. Putin.

According to Vladimir Churov, head of the Central Election Commission of Russia (CECR), most western critics of the election either did not provide any sources, or provided invalid sources for their allegations. Among the invalid sources, he mentioned 'observers from "human rights" organizations, and activists of the opposition such as Communist Gennady Zyuganov and Maria Gaidar from the liberal camp'. The CECR is considering suing western media and their Russian sources for libel.

=== Russian journalists ===
Russian Novaya Gazeta claimed that there were forged election protocols and cases when independent observers were not allowed to monitor the election process. Journalist Victor Shenderovich claims that only 3.5% of voters came to the elections in certain North Caucasus regions according to independent observers, whereas the Central Election committee reporter more than 90% turnaround.

Writer and radio host Yulia Latynina, known for her often sharp, polemic and radical statements, particularly for her claim that Italian Prime Minister Silvio Berlusconi, French President Jacques Chirac, Chancellor of Germany Gerhard Schröder, and U.S. President George W. Bush have all been successfully "recruited" by Vladimir Putin to serve his political objectives, and her prediction that Mr. Putin would secure a third term, said at the Echo of Moscow that election fraud was inevitable. She said that according to Russian laws, local election committees are free to rewrite the election protocol after asking the independent observers to leave the voting place; and members of those committees are not punishable for the election fraud. Even more important, she stresses, are alleged manipulations with the Russian computerized election system, which she claims follows pre-programmed instructions to automatically reject any favorable results for the opposition parties.

Political analyst and United Russia member, Sergei Markov, said that the outcome of this poll was predetermined because of how much support the Russian people show for Vladimir Putin's policies. "The Russian people have seen how successful these policies have been, and they want them to continue", he says. Markov cited fears that the west would interfere and change the course of the election, like they did in Ukraine and Georgia.

== See also ==
- 2007 Russian legislative election#Criticism
