= List of ambassadors of Russia to Slovenia =

Ambassador of the Russian Federation to the Republic of Slovenia
- Veleposlaništvo Ruske Federacije v Republiki Sloveniji
- Emblem of the Russian Foreign Ministry

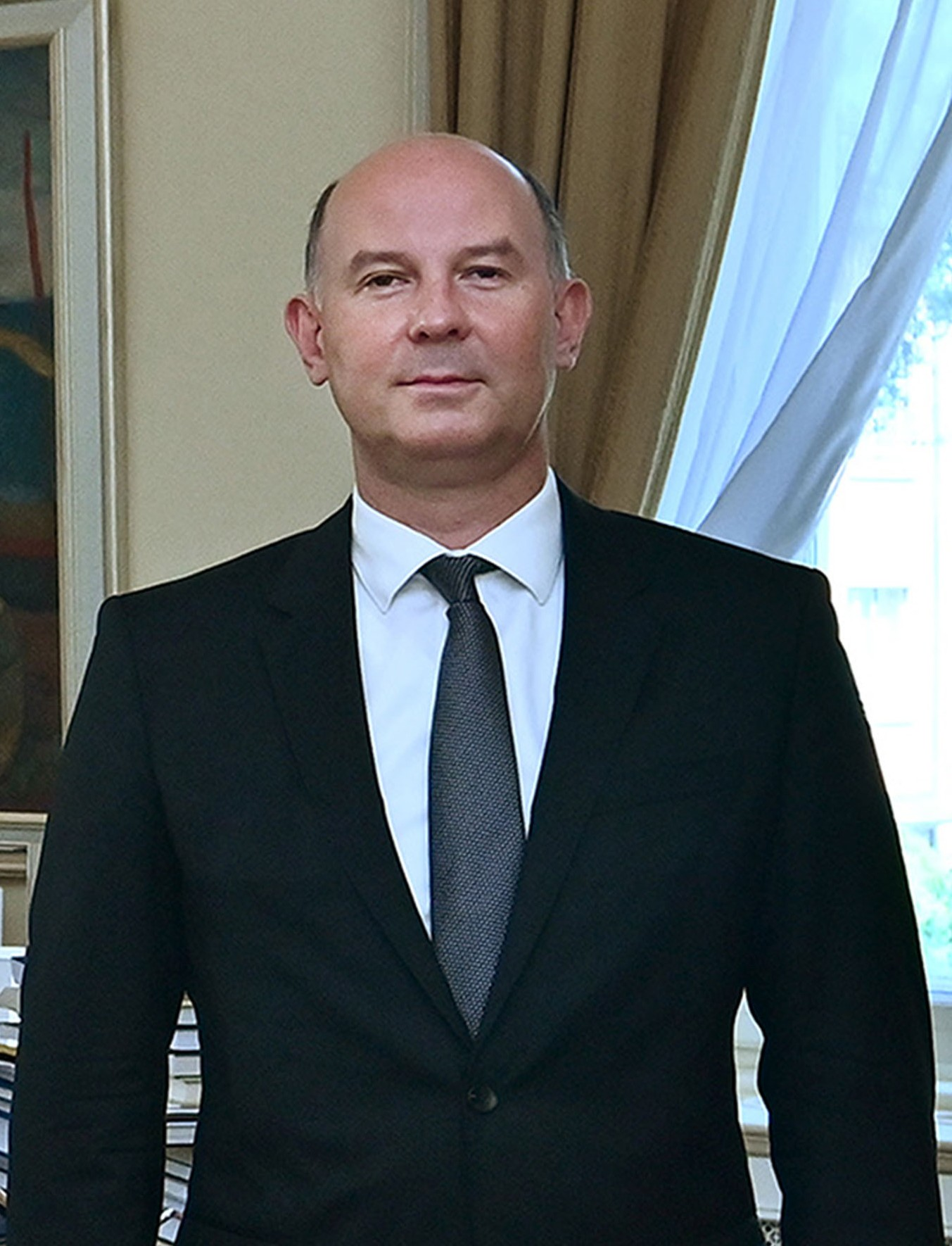
- Incumbent; Timur Eyvazov since 18 November 2019
- Ministry of Foreign Affairs; Embassy of Russia in Ljubljana
- Style: His Excellency; The Honourable
- Reports to: Minister of Foreign Affairs
- Seat: Ljubljana
- Appointer: President of Russia
- Term length: At the pleasure of the president
- Website: Embassy of Russia in Ljubljana

The ambassador of Russia to Slovenia is the official representative of the president and the government of the Russian Federation to the president and the government of Slovenia.

The ambassador and his staff work at large in the Russian Embassy in Ljubljana. The current Russian ambassador to Slovenia is Timur Eyvazov, incumbent since 18 November 2019.

== History of diplomatic relations ==
The Soviet Union maintained diplomatic relations with the Socialist Federal Republic of Yugoslavia throughout the twentieth-century, with ambassadors appointed up until the dissolution of the Soviet Union in 1991, and thereafter with the Russian Federation recognised as its successor state. Yugoslavia had also begun to break up by 1991, with Slovenia one of the first former constituent states to vote for independence. The Basic Constitutional Charter on the Independence and Sovereignty of the Republic of Slovenia was adopted on 25 June 1991, a process sparking the Ten-Day War and the subsequent establishment of full independence from Yugoslavia. Russia recognised the Republic of Slovenia on 14 February 1992, and official diplomatic relations were established on 25 May 1992. The Slovenian Embassy in Moscow was opened on 24 June 1992, and the Russian Embassy in Ljubljana on 14 October 1992. The first Russian ambassador to Slovenia, Aleksey Nikiforov, was appointed on 23 December 1994.

== Representatives of the Russian Federation to the Republic of Slovenia (1994–present) ==
Name	Title	Appointment	Termination	Notes
Aleksey Nikiforov	Ambassador	23 December 1994	23 October 1997	
Tigran Karakhanov	Ambassador	2 April 1998	17 June 2002	
Vyacheslav Dolgov	Ambassador	17 June 2002	10 December 2004	
Mikhail Vanin	Ambassador	10 December 2004	23 September 2009	
Doku Zavgayev	Ambassador	23 September 2009	18 November 2019	
Timur Eyvazov	Ambassador	18 November 2019		
