= List of ambassadors of Russia to Latvia =

Ambassador of the Russian Federation to the Republic of Latvia
- Emblem of the Russian Foreign Ministry
- Incumbent vacant since 31 March 2023
- Ministry of Foreign Affairs; Embassy of Russia in Riga
- Style: His Excellency; The Honourable
- Reports to: Minister of Foreign Affairs
- Seat: Riga
- Appointer: President of Russia
- Term length: At the pleasure of the president
- Website: Embassy of Russia in Latvia

The ambassador extraordinary and plenipotentiary of the Russian Federation to the Republic of Latvia is the official representative of the president and the government of the Russian Federation to the president and the government of Latvia.

Before the downgrade of diplomatic relations between Russia and Latvia following the Russian invasion of Ukraine, the ambassador and his staff used to work at large in the Embassy of Russia in Riga. There were consulates general in Daugavpils and Liepāja.

In 2022, the Latvian government closed the two Russian consulates and in 2023 the Russian ambassador to Latvia was expelled.

== History of diplomatic relations ==
The territory occupied by Latvia had been part of the Russian Empire since the eighteenth century. In the aftermath of the First World War and the collapse of the empire following the Russian Revolution in 1917, Latvia declared independence on 18 November 1918. Diplomatic relations were established between Latvia and the Russian Soviet Federative Socialist Republic to Latvia on 11 August 1920, and Yakov Ganetsky was appointed the first Plenipotentiary representative on 31 August that year. Representation continued until the Soviet occupation of Latvia in 1940, after which Latvia was de facto part of the USSR for the remainder of the existence of the Soviet Union, with the exception of a period of occupation by Nazi Germany between 1941 and 1944 during the Second World War. Soviet forces re-occupied Latvia in 1944, after which Latvia became a constituent part of the Soviet Union as the Latvian Soviet Socialist Republic.

As part of the dissolution of the Soviet Union in 1991, Latvia's secession was recognized by the State Council of the Soviet Union on 6 September 1991. Diplomatic relations with Russia were established on 4 October 1991.

Following growing diplomatic tensions in the aftermath of the Russian invasion of Ukraine, the Latvian government expelled the Russian ambassador to Latvia and downgraded diplomatic relations between the countries.

== List of representatives (1920–present) ==
=== Russian Soviet Federative Socialist Republic to Latvia (1920–1923) ===
Name	Title	Appointment	Termination	Notes
Yakov Ganetsky	Plenipotentiary representative	31 August 1920	7 December 1921	
Konstantin Yurenev	Plenipotentiary representative	1 February 1922	14 February 1923	
Adam Semashko	Chargé d'affaires	1923	1923	
Semyon Aralov	Plenipotentiary representative	28 May 1923	23 July 1923	

=== Union of Soviet Socialist Republics to Latvia (1923–1940) ===
Name	Title	Appointment	Termination	Notes
Semyon Aralov	Plenipotentiary representative	23 July 1923	21 March 1925	
Kazimir Krzheminsky	Chargé d'affaires	1924	1924	
Aleksandr Gambarov	Chargé d'affaires	1925	1925	
Aleksey Chernykh	Plenipotentiary representative	9 July 1925	24 February 1927	
Sigizmund Borkusevich	Chargé d'affaires	1926	1926	
Ivan Lorents	Plenipotentiary representative	24 February 1927	14 September 1929	
Aleksey Svidersky	Plenipotentiary representative	14 September 1929	10 May 1933	
Stefan Bratman-Brodovsky	Plenipotentiary representative	10 October 1933	25 October 1937	
Ivan Zotov	Plenipotentiary representative	1 November 1937	6 April 1940	
Vladimir Derevyansky	Plenipotentiary representative	7 April 1940	10 October 1940	

=== Russian Federation to Latvia (1992–present) ===
Name	Title	Appointment	Termination	Notes
Aleksandr Rannikh	Ambassador	2 March 1992	25 November 1996	
Aleksandr Udaltsov	Ambassador	25 November 1996	13 February 2001	
Igor Studennikov	Ambassador	13 February 2001	1 September 2004	
Viktor Kalyuzhny	Ambassador	13 February 2001	11 January 2008	
Alexander Veshnyakov	Ambassador	11 January 2008	15 December 2016	
Yevgeny Lukyanov	Ambassador	15 December 2016	25 March 2021	
Vadim Vasileyev	Charge d'affaires	25 March 2021	28 September 2021	
Mikhail Vanin	Ambassador	28 September 2021	31 March 2023	declared persona non grata
