= Mikhail Vanin =

Russian diplomat

- Михаил Ванин
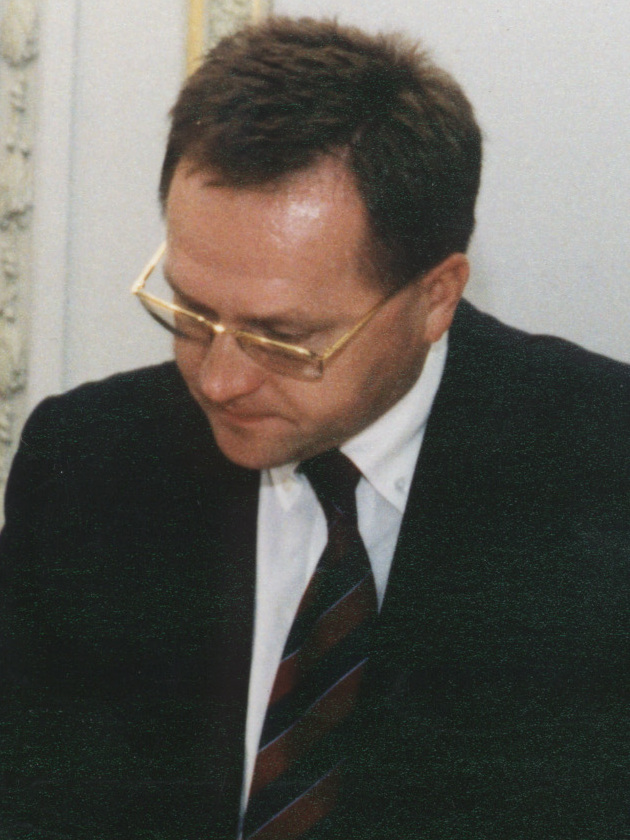
- Vanin in 2000

Ambassador of Russia to Latvia
- In office 28 September 2021 – 31 March 2023
- Preceded by: Yevgeny Lukyanov

Ambassador of Russia to Denmark
- In office 6 April 2012 – 12 December 2018
- Preceded by: Teimuraz Ramishvili
- Succeeded by: Vladimir Barbin

Director General of the Ministry of Foreign Affairs
- In office 23 September 2009 – 6 April 2012
- Preceded by: Doku Zavgayev
- Succeeded by: Sergey Mareyev

Ambassador of Russia to Slovenia
- In office 10 December 2004 – 23 September 2009
- Preceded by: Vyacheslav Dolgov
- Succeeded by: Doku Zavgayev

Chairman of the State Customs Committee
- In office 27 May 1999 – 29 July 2004
- Preceded by: Nikolay Bordyuzha
- Succeeded by: office abolished

Personal details
- Born: Mikhail Valentinovich Vanin; 1 August 1960 Kubinka, Moscow Oblast, Soviet Union

Mikhail Valentinovich Vanin (Russian: Михаил Валентинович Ванин; born on 1 August 1960), is a Russian official who served as ambassador to Latvia from 2021 to 2023.

Vanin also served as the ambassador to Denmark from 2012 to 2018, and as the ambassador to Slovenia from 2004 to 2009. He had previously been the Chairman of the State Customs Committee from 1999 to 2004. He was awarded the rank of Active State Advisor to the Customs Service in 2002.

== Biography ==
Vanin was born on 1 August 1960.

In 1982, he graduated from the Faculty of Law of Moscow State University and entered the service in the customs authorities.

Since 1982, he had been an inspector, then senior inspector, leading inspector, chief inspector, deputy head, head of the anti-smuggling department, deputy head of the Sheremetyevo Customs.

From 1990 to 1991, he was the chief legal adviser of the Contractual and Legal Department of the Ministry of Foreign Affairs of the RSFSR.

From 1992 to 1999, he was the head of the Department for Combating Smuggling and Violations of Customs Rules of the State Customs Committee of Russia (since 1995 - Department for Combating Customs Offenses).

From November 1998 to April 1999, he was the representative of the State Customs Committee of Russia in Kyrgyzstan.

From April to May 1999, he was the head of the Customs Inspectorate of the State Customs Committee of Russia.

On 27 May 1999, Vanin became the chairman of the State Customs Committee of Russia.

He was the chairman of: the Customs Committee of the Union of Belarus and Russia, the Council of Heads of Customs Services of the Commonwealth of Independent States, the Council of Heads of Customs Services of the Countries - Members of the Eurasian Economic Community.

On 10 December 2004, Vanin became the Ambassador of Russia to Slovenia.

On 23 September 2009 he became the General Director of the Ministry of Foreign Affairs.

On 6 April 2012, he became the Ambassador of Russia to Denmark.

On 28 September 2021, Vanin became the Ambassador of Russia to Latvia. Following growing diplomatic tensions in the aftermath of the Russian invasion of Ukraine, the Latvian government expelled the Russian ambassador to Latvia. Vanin left office on 31 March 2023.

== Special ranks ==
- State Customs Service Counsellor, 3rd Class (29 November 1993)
- Active State Customs Service Counsellor of the Russian Federation (23 October 2002)

== Awards ==
Vanin was awarded the Order of Friendship in 2016.
