= Dmitry Mezentsev =

Governor of Irkutsk Oblast, Russia

- Дмитрий Мезенцев
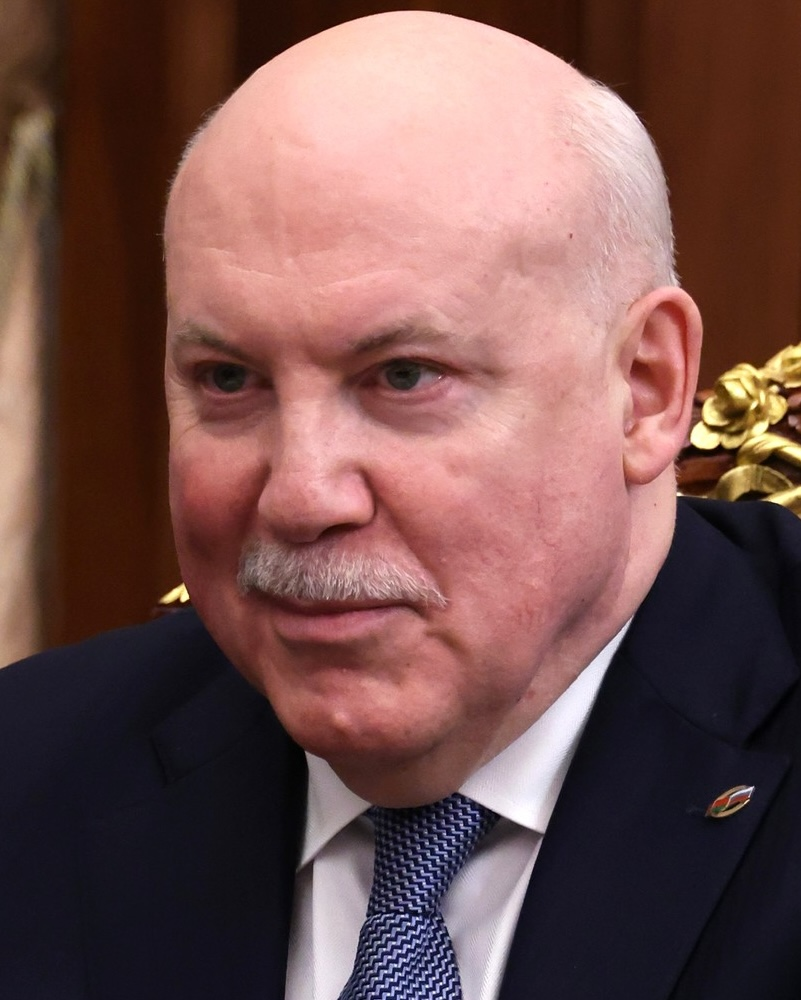
- Mezentsev in 2022

Presidential Plenipotentiary Representative in the Constitutional Court
- Incumbent
- Assumed office 17 April 2025
- President: Vladimir Putin
- Preceded by: Aleksandr Konovalov

General Secretary of the Union State of Russia and Belarus
- In office 19 March 2021 – 17 April 2025
- Preceded by: Grigory Rapota
- Succeeded by: Sergey Glazyev

Ambassador of Russia to Belarus
- In office 30 April 2019 – 19 March 2021
- Preceded by: Mikhail Babich
- Succeeded by: Yevgeny Lukyanov

Russian Federation Senator from Sakhalin Oblast
- In office 31 December 2015 – 30 April 2019
- Preceded by: Zhanna Ivanova
- Succeeded by: Grigory Karasin

Secretary-General of the Shanghai Cooperation Organisation
- In office 1 January 2013 – 31 December 2015
- Preceded by: Muratbek Imanaliyev
- Succeeded by: Rashid Alimov

5th Governor of Irkutsk Oblast
- In office 8 June 2009 – 18 May 2012
- Preceded by: Igor Yesipovsky
- Succeeded by: Sergey Yeroshchenko

Personal details
- Born: 18 August 1959 (age 67) Leningrad, Russian Soviet Federative Socialist Republic, Soviet Union
- Party: United Russia

Dmitry Fyodorovich Mezentsev (Russian: Дми́трий Фёдорович Ме́зенцев; born 18 August 1959) is a Russian politician and diplomat serving as the Presidential Plenipotentiary Representative in the Constitutional Court of Russia since April 2025. Previously he served as the State Secretary of the Union State of Russia and Belarus (2021–2025), Russia's Ambassador to Belarus (2019–2021), Senator from Sakhalin Oblast (2015–2019), Secretary-General of the Shanghai Cooperation Organisation (2013–2015) and Governor of Irkutsk Oblast (2009–2012).

In 2012 Mezentsev ran for President of Russia, but was rejected by the Central Election Commission.

== Early life ==
Mezentsev was born on 18 August 1959 in Leningrad, then part of the Russian SFSR.

== 2012 presidential campaign ==
Mezentsev tried to run for President of Russia in 2012. On 14 December 2011, the trade Union Committee of the East Siberian railway nominated Dmitry Mezentsev as a presidential candidate. His candidacy was supported by the then President of Russian Railways Vladimir Yakunin. However, the CEC rejected Mezentsev's candidacy, as after checking the signatures collected in his support, too many signatures were not recognized as valid.

On 19 March 2021, Mezentsev was relieved of his post as ambassador to Belarus by presidential decree. On the same day President of Belarus Alexander Lukashenko appointed Mezentsev State Secretary of the Union State of Russia and Belarus, replacing Grigory Rapota.

== International sanctions ==
In February 2024 he was sanctioned by the United States for helping organize the transportation of children from Ukraine to Belarus during the Russian invasion of Ukraine and for visiting camps where deported children from Ukraine resided. He was then sanctioned by the European Union in June 2024 for the same reason of the deportation of Ukrainian children to Belarus, in addition they stated that he was infringing the territorial integrity of Ukraine with these actions. Prior to both of these sanctions in November 2023 he was sanctioned by Ukraine.

== Awards ==
- Order For Merit to the Fatherland 4th class
- Order of Honour
- Medal "For Construction of the Baikal-Amur Railway" (USSR)
- Commander of the Order of the Legion of Honour (France)
