= List of ambassadors of Russia to Belarus =

Ambassador of the Russian Federation to the Republic of Belarus
- Emblem of the Russian Foreign Ministry

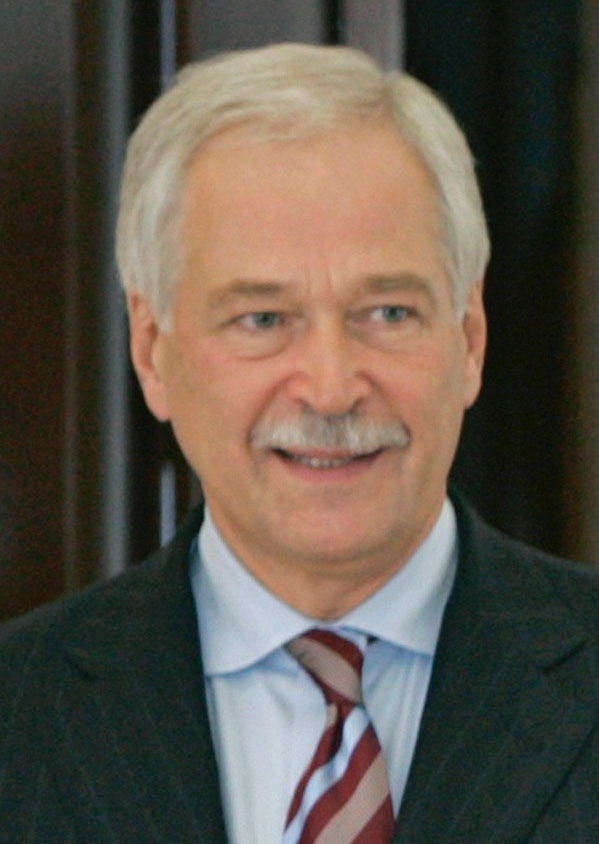
- Incumbent; Boris Gryzlov since 14 January 2022
- Ministry of Foreign Affairs; Embassy of Russia in Minsk
- Style: His Excellency; The Honourable
- Reports to: Minister of Foreign Affairs
- Seat: Minsk
- Appointer: President of Russia
- Term length: At the pleasure of the president
- Website: Embassy of Russia in Belarus

The ambassador extraordinary and plenipotentiary of the Russian Federation to the Republic of Belarus is the official representative of the president and the government of the Russian Federation to the president and the government of Belarus.

The ambassador and his staff work at large in the Russian embassy in Minsk. There is a consulate general in Brest. The post of Russian ambassador to Belarus has been held by Boris Gryzlov since 14 January 2022.

== History of diplomatic relations ==
With the dissolution of the Soviet Union in 1991, diplomatic relations between the Russian Federation and the Republic of Belarus were first established on 25 June 1992.

== Representatives of the Russian Federation to the Republic of Belarus (1992–present) ==
Name	Title	Appointment	Termination	Notes
Igor Saprykin	Ambassador	17 August 1992	25 November 1996	
Valery Loshchinin	Ambassador	25 November 1996	24 February 1999	
Vyacheslav Dolgov	Ambassador	24 February 1999	17 June 2002	
Alexander Blokhin	Ambassador	26 July 2002	14 July 2005	
Dmitry Ayatskov	Ambassador appointee	14 July 2005	30 November 2005	Appointed on 14 July 2005 but appointment refused by Belarus and withdrawn on 30 November 2005
Aleksandr Surikov	Ambassador	6 February 2006	24 August 2018	
Mikhail Babich	Ambassador	24 August 2018	30 April 2019	
Dmitry Mezentsev	Ambassador	30 April 2019	19 March 2021	
Yevgeny Lukyanov	Ambassador	23 March 2021	14 January 2022	
Boris Gryzlov	Ambassador	14 January 2022		
