= Alexey Obukhov =

Soviet diplomat and politician (1937–2022)

Alexey Aleksandrovich Obukhov (Russian: Алексе́й Алекса́ндрович О́бухов; 12 November 1937 – 16 October 2022) was a Russian diplomat and politician.

Obukhov served as the Deputy Foreign Minister from 1989 to 1991 and as the Ambassador Extraordinary and Plenipotentiary of Russia to Denmark from 1992 to 1996.

== Early life ==
Graduated from the Moscow State Institute of International Relations in 1961. Joined the Ministry of Foreign Affairs, USSR in 1963.

== Political activity ==
- Served at the Soviet Embassy in Thailand.
- Senior Adviser at the Staff of Soviet Deputy Foreign Minister Vladimir Semyonov since 1968.
- Since 1971 joined the Soviet-American negotiations on reduction of strategic weapons in Helsinki, Vienna, Geneva.
- Deputy Chief, Chief of Soviet delegation in Geneva negotiating the INF treaty with the USA. Intermediate-Range Nuclear Forces Treaty (INF) is between the United States and the Soviet Union, signed in Washington, D.C., by U.S. President Ronald Reagan and General Secretary Mikhail Gorbachev on December 8, 1987. Obukhov flew to Washington, D.C., on a special flight with the Treaty’s copy in hands to give it over to the Presidents Reagan and Gorbachev for signing.
- In 1988–1989 chief of Department of USA and Canada at the Ministry of Foreign Affairs, USSR.
- 1990–1991 – Soviet Deputy Foreign Minister, in charge of Soviet-American relations and negotiations on reduction of strategic weapons.
- 1991–1992 – Russian Deputy Foreign Minister
- 1992–1996 – Ambassador of Russia to Denmark. While in Denmark, befriended Prince Dimitri Romanov and Prince Nicholas Romanov. Participated in the noble activities of the Romanov Fund for Russia.
- 1997–2003 – Ambassador at Large, Ministry of Foreign Affairs, Russia.
- 1997–2003 – head of the Russian delegation at the Russian-Lithuanian negotiations on border issues. Prepared the Treaty on Russian-Lithuanian State border and the Treaty on the Delimitation of the Exclusive Economic Zone and Continental Shelf in the Baltic Sea for signing by the Presidents of Russia and Lithuania. On 23–25 October 1997 the Treaty on Russian-Lithuanian border was signed by Presidents Boris Yeltsin and Algirdas Brazauskas.
- 1999–2002 – the Russian Representative at the Council of the Baltic Sea States, Chairman of the Committee of senior officials at the Barents Euro-Arctic Council.
- 2003–2009 – head of the Russian delegation at the Russian-Lithuanian Commission on the border issues. Participated in numerous negotiations on border issues in Vilnius, Warsaw, Minsk.
- 2009–2012 – head of the Russian delegation at the Russian-Latvian Commission on the border issues, co-chairman to the Joint Latvia-Russia Demarcation commission set up in accordance with Article 5 of the Treaty between the Republic of Latvia and the Russian Federation on the State Border of Latvia and Russia. Participated in the numerous on border issues in Riga, Daugavpils.

== International conferences activity ==
- Participated in the international conferences "Overcoming nuclear danger" held by the World Political Forum.

Literary and philosophical works:

- «The Philosophy of Political Violence»
- «Socialist Policy of Peace: the Theory and the Practice»
- «On the Way to Reducing the Military Tension»
- «The Soviet-American Relations: the Past and the Present»
- «A Dangerous Step»«Edward Teller: the Thermo-Nuclear Bomb Legacy».
- «Nuclear Non-Proliferation: A Brief Encyclopedia». Moscow, 2009. ISBN 978-5-8243-1130-3.
- «Russia-Denmark: the Painters of the Imperial Courts»
