= Yevgeny Lukyanov =

Russian diplomat (born 1950s)

- Евгений Лукьянов

Ambassador of Russia to Belarus
- In office 25 March 2021 – 14 January 2022
- Minister: Sergey Lavrov
- Preceded by: Dmitry Mezentsev
- Succeeded by: Boris Gryzlov

Ambassador of Russia to Latvia
- In office 15 December 2016 – 25 March 2021
- Preceded by: Alexander Veshnyakov
- Succeeded by: Mikhail Vanin

Personal details
- Born: 11 March 1959 (age 67) Moscow, Russian SFSR, Soviet Union
- Education: Leningrad State University
- Awards: Order of Honour; Medal of the Order "For Merit to the Fatherland"

Yevgeny Vladimirovich Lukyanov (Russian: Евгений Владимирович Лукьянов; born 10 December 1951, Leningrad, USSR) is a Soviet and Russian politician and diplomat. He holds the rank of Ambassador Extraordinary and Plenipotentiary (2018).

== Biography ==
In 1974, he graduated from the Leningrad State University, specializing in English language and literature. He is proficient in English and French.

From 1974 to 1981, he worked as an engineer-translator at the "Impulse" Research Institute. From 1981 to 1984, he served as Deputy Secretary of the Board of the Leningrad branch of the Union of Journalists of the USSR.

From 1984 to 1990, he held a diplomatic post at the Ministry of Foreign Affairs of the USSR. From 1987 to 1990, he served as Deputy Representative of the USSR Ministry of Foreign Affairs in Leningrad. From 1990 to 1991, he was deputy director for External Relations at the Hermitage Museum. From 1991 to 1993, he served as Vice-Rector for External Financing and International Relations at the International Institute for the Development and Training of Banking and Exchange Activities.

From 1993 to 2006, he held executive positions at Dresdner Bank and Vneshtorgbank in St. Petersburg. From September 2006 to June 2007, he served as Head of the Department for Socio-Economic and Financial Monitoring within the Office of the Plenipotentiary Representative of the President of the Russian Federation in the Northwestern Federal District.

From June 2007 to December 2010, he served as Deputy Plenipotentiary Representative of the President of the Russian Federation in the Northwestern Federal District, overseeing the socio-economic sphere.

Since 26 December 2010, he has served as an aide to the Secretary of the Security Council of the Russian Federation. From 23 March 2012 to 15 December 2016, he served as Deputy Secretary of the Security Council of the Russian Federation. From 15 December 2016 to 25 March 2021, he served as Ambassador Extraordinary and Plenipotentiary of the Russian Federation to Latvia. He presented his letters of credence on 7 February 2017. From 25 March 2021 to 14 January 2022, he served as Ambassador Extraordinary and Plenipotentiary of the Russian Federation to the Republic of Belarus. He presented his letters of credence on May 13, 2021.

=== Civil service rank and diplomatic rank ===
- Active State Councilor of the Russian Federation, 3rd class (13 December 2007).
- Active State Councilor of the Russian Federation, 2nd class (7 May 2009).
- Ambassador Extraordinary and Plenipotentiary (13 June 2018).
