= Institute for Election Systems Development =

Organization in Russia

INSOR
- Official language: Russian

The Institute for Election Systems Development (IESD) is an organization founded in 1999 to promote democracy in Russia.

== History ==
IESD was founded in 1999 as the International Foundation for Electoral Systems withdrew from Russia. IESD inherited both the programs started by IFES and IFES's Election Resource Center, a group of references created to support the Central Election Commission of Russia.

== Mission ==
According to their website IESD:

- promotes democracy in Russia by providing technical assistance and comprehensive and objective information to all participants of the election process.
- strives to enhance the public trust for democracy as the basis of the civil society.

In achieve these goals they, according to their website:

- Disseminate information about elections to ensure that the election process is transparent.
- Educate participants of the election process on the basic, generally acknowledged principles of election campaign ethics, elections per se, and subsequent responsibilities elected deputies have with respect to their voters.
