= Ivan Lorents =

Polish-born Soviet diplomat

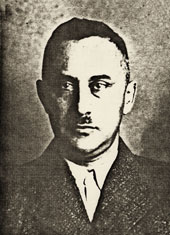
Ivan Leopoldovich Lorents

Ivan Leopoldovich Lorents (Russian: Иван Леопольдович Лоренц) (2 October 1890 – 28 July 1941) was a Polish-born Soviet diplomat.

Lorents was born in Łódź in 1890. In 1913 he graduated from the Faculty of Law at Saint Petersburg University and went on to study at the Mikhailovsk Artillery School, where he graduated in 1915. Subsequent to graduation, he went into service in the Russian Army.

From March to June 1918, Lorents was attached to the People's Commissariat of Foreign Affairs of the RSFSR in Petrograd when was sent to Berlin until November of that year to fulfill a position in Soviet Russia's representative in Germany.

He returned to Moscow and worked for a month in the People's Commissariat of Foreign Affairs before joining the 15th Army on the Western Front for a year. In 1920, Lorents moved to Latvia and served as Secretary to the Plenipotentiary Representative of the Russian Soviet Federative Socialist Republic to Latvia. He served in that position for a year before going to Poland, where he fulfilled various positions.

From 29 August 1923 until 9 July 1925, he was Plenipotentiary Representative of the USSR in Lithuania, followed by Plenipotentiary Representative of the Soviet Union in Finland from 9 July 1925 until 6 July 1927. During his time in Finland, from 24 January 1927, he also was concurrent Plenipotentiary Representative of the USSR in Latvia, and held that position until 14 September 1929. From 17 March 1935 to 31 September 1938, he was Plenipotentiary Representative of the Soviet Union in Austria in Vienna.

On his return to the Soviet Union, Lorents was arrested by the NKVD on 15 October 1939 and sentenced to death on 7 July 1941 by the Military Collegium of the Supreme Court for participation in "counter-revolutionary terrorist organisations" and espionage. He was executed on 28 July 1941 and buried in Kommunarka, Moscow Oblast.

Lorents was posthumously rehabilitated by the Military Collegium of the Supreme Court in April 1956.
