= Alexander Veshnyakov =

Russian diplomat (born 1952)

- Александр Вешняков
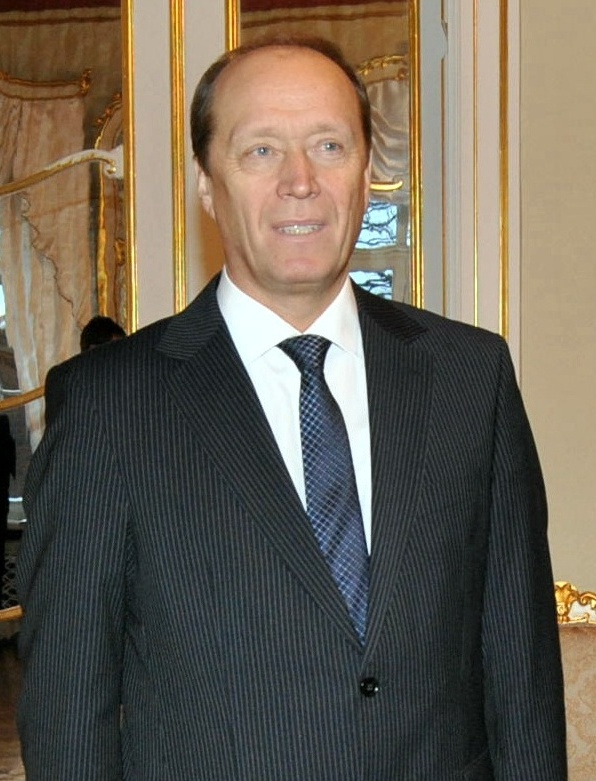
- Veshnyakov in 2010

Ambassador of Russia to Latvia
- In office 12 February 2008 – 15 December 2016
- Preceded by: Viktor Kalyuzhny
- Succeeded by: Yevgeny Lukyanov

Chairman of the Central Election Commission of Russia
- In office 24 March 1999 – 26 March 2007
- Preceded by: Alexander Ivanchenko
- Succeeded by: Vladimir Churov

Congress of People's Deputies deputy
- In office 18 March 1990 – 4 October 1993

Personal details
- Born: Alexander Veshnyakov; 24 November 1952 (age 73) Baykalovo, Russian SFSR, Soviet Union
- Education: Russian MFA Academy

Alexander Albertovich Veshnyakov (Russian: Александр Альбертович Вешняков; born November 24, 1952) is a Russian official. Between March 21, 1995 and March 24, 1999, he was the Secretary of the Central Election Commission of Russia. He was the Chairman of the Central Election Commission between March 24, 1999 and March 26, 2007.

== Biography ==
Veshnyakov lost his post heading the elections commission after he balked at putting into effect an election law revision that removed a minimum 20% turnout requirement, without which an election was invalid, and introduced new reasons for refusing registration to would-be candidates, saying it could be a pretext for refusing registration to candidates who were “undesirable”.

President Vladimir Putin simply did not put forward Veshnyakov’s name for renewed membership of the election commission.

Before the voting law was changed, Veshnyakov had in July 2006 told the Itogi weekly that if the ruling pro-Kremlin United Russia party that secured victory at any cost by changing the electoral laws, it would be a "Pyrrhic victory", RIA Novosti reported on March 13. In an apparent reference to the Soviet Union, he had said: "Just recently, we had a sham legislature and sham elections, and it did not hamper the country's development at that point. But the system failed to survive the test of time and collapsed."

"[His] ousting, according to some experts, can be explained by his critical attitude to the most outrageous amendments, as viewed by the masses, to the electoral legislation (the abolition of the minimum turnout and the ‘none-of the above’ entry on the ballot)," political commentator Dmitry Shusharin wrote for the country’s state new agency, RIA Novosti. "And even if there were no such remarks, his eight years in the post have earned Veshnyakov considerable weight in the country and the world, making him a media person of note. For the political establishment in Russia, all this is reason enough to doubt the man's political loyalty and suspect him of being a maverick."

Veshnyakov was appointed Ambassador of Russia to Latvia, Radio Free Europe reported on January 11 quoting the gazeta.ru news portal the same day. The Kremlin, the radio reported, had been looking for a senior post away from Moscow to which it could send Veshnyakov, who was well known in Russia as the often outspoken former head of the Central Election Commission. His replacement, former ultranationalist State Duma deputy Vladimir Churov, had said he was "less likely to comment on election law and more inclined to get things done" than Veshnyakov.

On December 15, 2016 Alexander Veshnyakov was dismissed from the position of Ambassador in Latvia.

== Honours and awards ==
- Order of Merit for the Fatherland;
  - 2nd class (27 March 2007) - for outstanding contribution to strengthening Russian statehood, development and improvement of the electoral system of the Russian Federation
  - 3rd class (30 December 2004) - a contribution to strengthening Russian statehood, development of electoral systems and long-term diligent work
  - 4th class
- Defender of Free Russia Medal (20 August 1997) - for performing their civic duty in defence of democracy and constitutional order during 19–21 August 1991
- Jubilee Medal "300 Years of the Russian Navy"
- Medal "In Commemoration of the 850th Anniversary of Moscow"

Political offices
Preceded by Alexander Ivanchenko	Chairman of the Central Election Commission of Russia; March 24, 1999, - March 26, 2007	Succeeded by Vladimir Churov
