= 1990 Slovenian independence referendum =

- 23 December 1990
- Should the Republic of Slovenia become an independent and sovereign state?

Results
Choice	Votes	%
Yes	1,289,369	95.71%
No	57,800	4.29%
Valid votes	1,347,169	99.09%
Invalid or blank votes	12,412	0.91%
Total votes	1,359,581	100.00%
Registered voters/turnout	1,457,020	93.31%

An independence referendum was held in the Republic of Slovenia (then part of SFR Yugoslavia) on 23 December 1990. Both the ruling center-right coalition and the left-wing opposition supported the referendum and called on voters to support Slovenian independence.

The voters were asked the question: "Should the Republic of Slovenia become an independent and sovereign state?" (Slovene: Ali naj Republika Slovenija postane samostojna in neodvisna država?). The Slovenian parliament set a threshold for the validity of the plebiscite at 50% plus one of all registered voters.

A total of 1,499,294 people were entitled to vote. However, 42,274 people could not vote because they were working abroad or involved in military service or military exercises, reducing the electorate to 1,457,020.

== Results ==
On 26 December, final results of the referendum were officially proclaimed by France Bučar in the Assembly. 88.5% of registered voters (95.7% of those participating) had voted in favour of independence, therefore exceeding the threshold. 4% had voted against independence, while 1% had cast invalid ballots and 0.1% had returned their ballots unused. 7% of the potential electorate did not participate in the elections.

Choice	Votes	%
For	1,289,369	95.71
Against	57,800	4.29
Total	1,347,169	100.00
Valid votes	1,347,169	99.09
Invalid/blank votes	12,412	0.91
Total votes	1,359,581	100.00
Registered voters/turnout	1,457,020	93.31
Source: Statistical Office

== Aftermath ==
In the month following the referendum, the Slovenian parliament proposed a six-month period of negotiations, with the goal of forming a loose confederation with the other Yugoslav republics. Unless such an agreement was reached within the deadline, the Slovenia parliament planned to unilaterally declare independence. On 25 June 1991, the deadline arrived with no such confederal agreement. As a result, the Basic Constitutional Charter on the Independence and Sovereignty of the Republic of Slovenia was passed and independence was declared the following day, leading to the Ten-Day War.
