= Johann Albrecht Korff =

Russian diplomat (1697–1766)

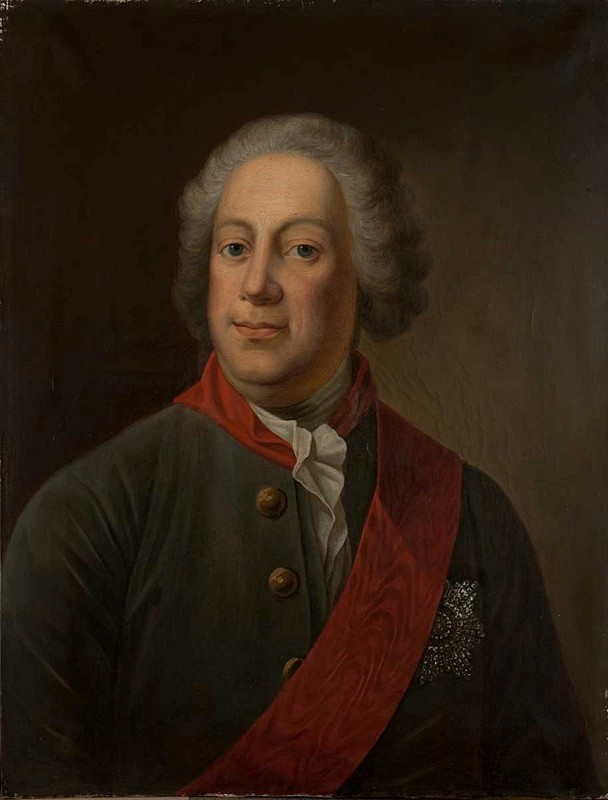
- Posthumous portrait, 1885
- Born: November 30, 1697; Rengenhoff, Duchy of Courland
- Died: April 7, 1766 (aged 68); Copenhagen, Denmark
- Education: University of Jena
- Occupation: Physician
- Scientific career
- Workplaces: Fellow of the Saint Petersburg Academy of Sciences

Baron Johann Albrecht von Korff (Russian: Иоганн Альбрехт Корф, romanized: Iogann Albrekht Korf; November 30, 1697 – April 7, 1766) was a Russian diplomat. He was the president of the St. Petersburg Academy of Sciences in 1734–1740.

A native of Courland, he moved through his service at the court duchess of Courland (then Russian empress) Anna Ivanovna. Since 1740, he was the Russian ambassador in Copenhagen. His library (36,000 volumes) was purchased for the Crown Prince of Grand Duke Paul Petrovich, then it passed to the Crown Prince Constantine Pavlovich.

== Biography ==
=== Early life ===
Johann Albrecht Korff was born November 30, 1697, in the Duchy of Courland. Korff graduated with honors from University of Jena. Shortly after returning from the university he was appointed chamberlain to the court of the Duchess of Courland Anna Ivanovna, and in 1728 sent to Moscow to request for a raise in their pension, which the Duchess received from the Russian court. In 1730 the Empress sent him to Courland to petition for listing the names of Peter von Biron in the number of Courland nobility.

In 1732, he was again sent to Courland, to pave the way for the election of the Duke of Courland Peter von Biron. Korf spent two years in Courland and arranged everything well.

=== At the head of the Academy of Sciences ===
Ernst Johann von Biron did not like Korff and, seeing him as a rival, tried to remove him from the court. The first step in the implementation of the plan was the appointment of Korff as the "chief commander of the Academy", which was followed in September 1734. A rescript of 18 September 1734 stated that he was charged with the duty "to manage and control the order of St. Petersburg Academy of Sciences.

After becoming the president, he carried on reforms, among which he ordered that henceforward the writing of academic papers was to be in German instead of Latin, and business correspondence was to be written in both Russian and German. In 1735 he wrote to the Slavic Greek Latin Academy for twenty of their best students to be sent to the Saint Petersburg State University associated with the academy. Mikhail Lomonosov was one of the 12 students who passed the competence and were selected for Saint Petersburg State University.

At that time the St. Petersburg Academy of Sciences was in particular need for competent chemists and metallurgists. For this reason, he established contact with Johann Friedrich Henckel. Under his presidency Hans Sloane was formally accepted as the academy's first English honorary member.

=== Envoy in Copenhagen ===
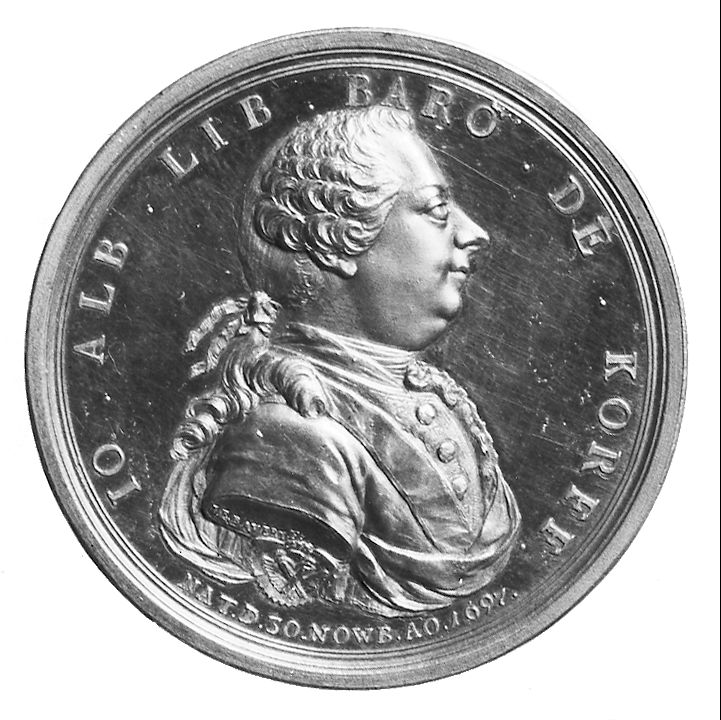
Medal to Korff.

In 1764, he submitted a proposal to the Empress for forming a strong Northern alliance to counteract the southern Austro Franco Spanish Alliance.

Korff died, unmarried, on April 7, 1766, in Denmark. After his death, on the orders of his nephew Fircks, in his honor in Copenhagen was struck silver medal.

== Awards ==
On January 31, 1748, Korff was granted to the privy councilors for diplomacy and on 9 March 1762 - in the real secret advisers. He was honored with awards: in 1743, the Order of St. Anna 1st degree, in 1744, the Order of St. Alexander Nevsky and in 1763 the Order of St. Andrew.

== Sources ==
- "Корф, Иоганн Альбрехт" . Brockhaus and Efron Encyclopedic Dictionary (in Russian). 1906.
