= Vyacheslav Dolgov =

Soviet and Russian diplomat (1937–2026)

Vyacheslav Ivanovich Dolgov (Russian: Вячеслав Иванович Долгов; 31 July 1937 – 23 September 2026) was a Soviet and Russian diplomat and academic.

== Life and career ==
Dolgov was born on 31 July 1937. After graduating from the Moscow State Institute of International Relations in 1961, Dolgov entered the diplomatic corps of the Soviet Ministry of Foreign Affairs. From 1982 to 1984, he was an Adviser-Envoy at the Soviet Embassy in London.

His first ambassadorial appointment came on 22 August 1990, when he was appointed Ambassador of the Soviet Union to Australia, with concurrent accreditation to Fiji, Nauru and Vanuatu. After the dissolution of the Soviet Union, Dolgov continued as Russian ambassador to Australia.

From 1994 to 1997, he was Ambassador of Russia to Kazakhstan, and 1997 to 1999, he was Director of the First Department for the CIS Countries in the Russian Ministry of Foreign Affairs.

From 1999 to 2002, he was posted to Minsk as Ambassador of Russia to Belarus, and from 2002 to the end of 2004, he was posted to Ljubljana as Ambassador of Russia to Slovenia.

From September 2005 to his death in 2026, Dolgov lectured in consular law at his alma mater.

Dolgov died on 23 September 2026, at the age of 89.
