= Central Election Commission (Russia) =

Russian government body

Coordinates: 55°45′27″N 37°37′35″E

- Центральная избирательная комиссия
- Emblem

- Logo

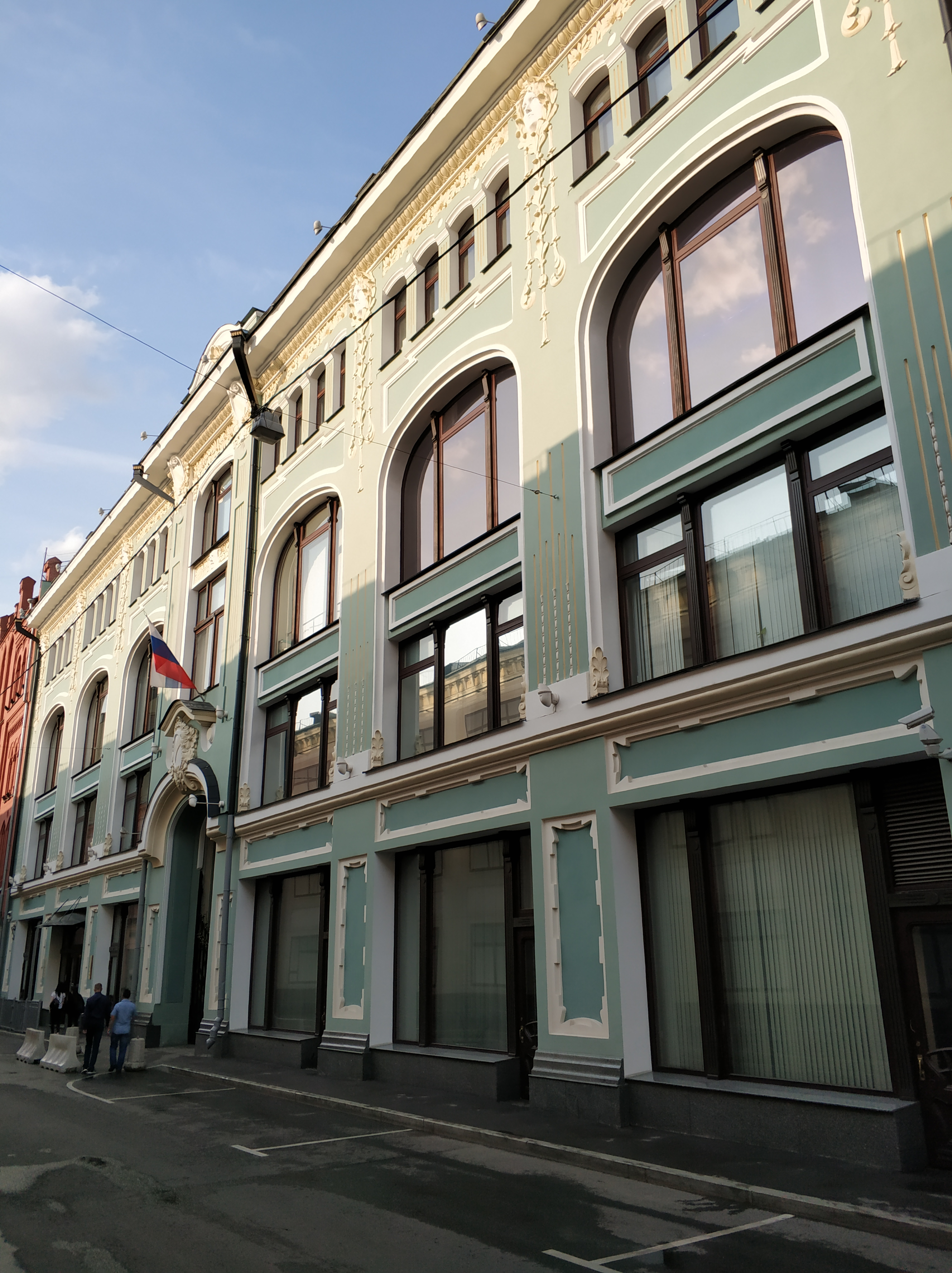
- Central Election Commission headquarters

Agency overview
- Formed: 1993
- Headquarters: Moscow
- Employees: 15
- Agency executive: Ella Pamfilova, Chairwoman
- Website: CIKRF.ru

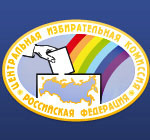
Former logo of the Central Election Commission

The Central Election Commission of the Russian Federation (Russian: Центральная избирательная комиссия Российской Федерации, romanized: Tsentral'naya izbiratel'naya komissiya Rossiyskoy Federatsii, abbr. ЦИК, TsIK), also known as Tsentrizbirkom (Russian: Центризбирком) is the superior power body responsible for conducting federal elections and overseeing local elections in the Russian Federation founded in September 1993. It consists of 15 members. The President of Russia, State Duma and Federation Council of Russia each appoint five members. In turn, these members elect the Chairman, Deputy Chairman and Secretary. The Commission is in power for a four-year term.

On 30 January 2007, amendments to the Russian election legislation, which would allow people without higher education in law to become members of the Central Election Commission, were passed by Vladimir Putin.

== History ==
In 1917–1918 there was the All-Russian election commission for the Constituent Assembly, in the Far East in 1920–1922 – The Central Election Commission for the elections to the National Assembly, 1937–1989 – The Central Election Commission on elections to the Supreme Soviet of the RSFSR, in the USSR in the same period – the Central Election Commission on elections to the Supreme Soviet of the USSR, in 1989–1993. Central Election Commission for the Election of the MPs of the RSFSR, in 1993–1995 – Central Election Commission for the Election of the Members for the State Duma of the Federal Assembly of the Russian Federation.

The Central Election Commission on elections to the State Duma was established by a decree of the President of the Russian Federation Boris Yeltsin of 24 September 1993. The first composition of the commission – 20 people – was approved by the head of state on 29 September 1993. Ten of them been at the suggestion of regional parliaments, and the other ten represented the bodies of executive power of the subjects of the Russian Federation. A prerequisite was that applicants had a higher legal education or a degree in law (then, since 2007, a higher education degree was required).

After the parliamentary elections in December 1993, the institution was renamed into the Central Election Commission of the Russian Federation.

== International Cooperation ==
The CEC of Russia was a member of the Association of Central and Eastern European Election Officials.

== Chairpersons ==
Name	Term of office		
Name	Start	End	Length of service
Nikolay Ryabov	24 September 1993	14 November 1996	3 years, 51 days (1,147 days)
Alexander Ivanchenko	14 November 1996	24 March 1999	2 years, 130 days (2,007 days)
Alexander Veshnyakov	24 March 1999	26 March 2007	8 years, 2 days (2,924 days)
Vladimir Churov	27 March 2007	27 March 2016	9 years, 0 days (3,288 days)
Ella Pamfilova	28 March 2016	—	10 years, 133 days (3,785 days)

== Members ==
The composition of the Central Election Commission, as of August 2026.

Name	Appointed by
Ella Pamfilova	President of Russia
Natalya Budarina	President of Russia
Igor Borisov	President of Russia
Anton Lopatin	President of Russia
Anatoly Sysoev	President of Russia
Nikolai Levichev (A Just Russia)	State Duma
Vasilina Kuliyeva (LDPR)	State Duma
Yevgeny Kolyushin (CPRF)	State Duma
Alyona Bulgakova (New People)	State Duma
Konstantin Mazurevsky (United Russia)	State Duma
Nikolay Bulayev	Federation Council
Yevgeny Shevchenko	Federation Council
Lyudmnila Markina	Federation Council
Elmira Khaimurzina	Federation Council
Pavel Andreyev	Federation Council

== Subordinate organizations ==
The following organizations are operating under Central Election Commission of the Russian Federation according to the corresponding presidential decrees of the President of Russia.

- Federal Center of Informatization
- Control and Audit Service Affiliated to the CEC of Russia
- Russian Center of Training in Electoral Technologies affiliated to CEC of Russia

== Functions ==
Central Electoral Committee of the Russian Federation:

- Is carrying out control on protection of the electoral rights and of the right to participate at the referendum of the citizens of the Russian Federation;
- Organizing, developing the standards of the technological equipment (the voting booth, ballot box) for the constituency commissions, approved the standards and carrying out control for their compliances, and as well organizes the placement of an order for the production of this technological equipment during the elections to the federal government bodies, the referendum of the Russian Federation;
- ensures the implementation of activities related to the preparation and conduct of elections, referendums, the development of the electoral system in the Russian Federation, the introduction, operation and development of automation equipment, voters legal training, professional training of commission members and other election organizers, referendums, publication of necessary printed materials;
- carries out measures to organize a uniform procedure for the distribution of airtime and print space among registered candidates, electoral associations for election campaigning, among the referendum initiative group and other groups of referendum participants for campaigning on referendum issues, establishing voting results, determining election results, referendums, as well as the procedure for publication (promulgation) of the voting results and the results of elections, referendum, while including in the information and telecommunication network "Internet" for public use;
- carries out measures to organize financing for the preparation and conduct of elections, referendums, allocates funds granted by the federal budget for the financial support of preparation and conduct of elections, referendum, controls the targeted use of these funds;
- carrying out the legal, methodological, logistical and technical assistance to the committees;
- carrying out the international cooperation in the field of voting systems;
- hears the reports from federal executive authorities, executive authorities of the constituent entities of the Russian Federation and local governments on issues related to the preparation and conduct of elections to the federal government bodies and the referendum of the Russian Federation;
- establishing the standards to prepare the lists of voters, the participants at the referendum and other voting documents, which relate also with the preparation and carrying out the referendum.
- Reviewing the petitions (claims) on the rulings and actions (inactions) of the subordinated committees and adopting the reasoning rulings based on the petitions submitted.
- Carrying out other tasks in accordance with the Federal Law in effect and with the other federal legislation.

== The Russian Center for Training in Electoral Technologies under the Central Election Commission of the Russian Federation ==
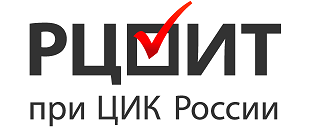
Logo of the RCTET at the CEC of Russia

An institution subordinate to the Central Election Commission of the Russian Federation. The main goals of its activities are training of election organizers and other participants in the electoral process, as well as improving the level of legal culture of citizens. Since 2015, the Center has a branch in the Republic of Crimea and the city of Sevastopol.

Since 2008, the Center for the Development of Information Technologies and Technology at the Central Executive Committee of the Russian Federation together with the scientific and technical center "Poisk-IT" has been developing and implementing a specialized software package for monitoring the media. The goal was to ensure equal distribution of airtime among candidates and parties, to comply with the procedure for publishing election results and to timely suppress violations in this area. According to experts, despite the futility of applying this system to the electoral process in foreign countries, it remains extremely popular to ensure the legality of elections in Russia itself.

In 2018, the format of conducting among students, graduate students and young teachers of the "Сontest for the best work on the issues of electoral law and the process" underwent significant changes, and the competition itself was called "Atmosphere". Since 2019, the rules for holding the Olympiad "Sophium" among students in grades 9-11 have changed.

Also in 2019, the official Youtube channel called “Simply about the Elections” was restarted, containing educational and enlightening materials on electoral topics.

At the end of 2019, the scientific journal "Citizen. Elections. Power" was included in the List of peer-reviewed scientific publications by decision of the Presidium of the Higher Attestation Commission.

One of the constant lines of educational work with youth is to conduct study tours of the building of the Central Election Commission of the Russian Federation.

The existing assessments of the results of the Center’s activities have changed significantly over time. If in mid-2017 experts agreed on the overall inefficiency of this state structure, then by the end of 2019 independent observers directly linked the reduction in violations in election commissions of various levels with the actions of the RCTET at the Central Executive Committee of Russia.

== Approving election candidates ==
The Commission has been known to be strict on candidate approval, with especially the Russian presidential elections being known to require that any and all documents are in order, whether due to real or disputed reasons.

In the 2024 Russian presidential election, Boris Nadezhdin was disqualified due to quirks in the approval process, as despite having received an estimate of more than 200,000 signatures, only a maximum of 105,000 of them could be submitted to the commission, and of those, 100,000 had to be accepted by the committee, who ended up only approving 95,987. With the committee citing reasons including alleged "dead people" and "information it said it received from Russia’s Internal Affairs Ministry" among the signatures, his disqualification has led to speculations about Kremlin interference in the committee processes.

In the 2018 Russian presidential election, Mikhail Kozlov was disqualified due to a missing document stamp, and Natalysa Lisitsyna due to a set of signatures not having made it to the Moscow commission office on time.

In the 2012 Russian presidential election, Grigory Yavlinsky and Dmitry Mezentsev were rejected due to alleged invalid signatures, Lidiya Bednaya due to supposedly not providing necessary documentation, Eduard Limonov for not having initiative committee member signatures certified by a notary, and Boris Mironov for having been previously convicted of publishing anti-Semitic texts.

== Gallery ==
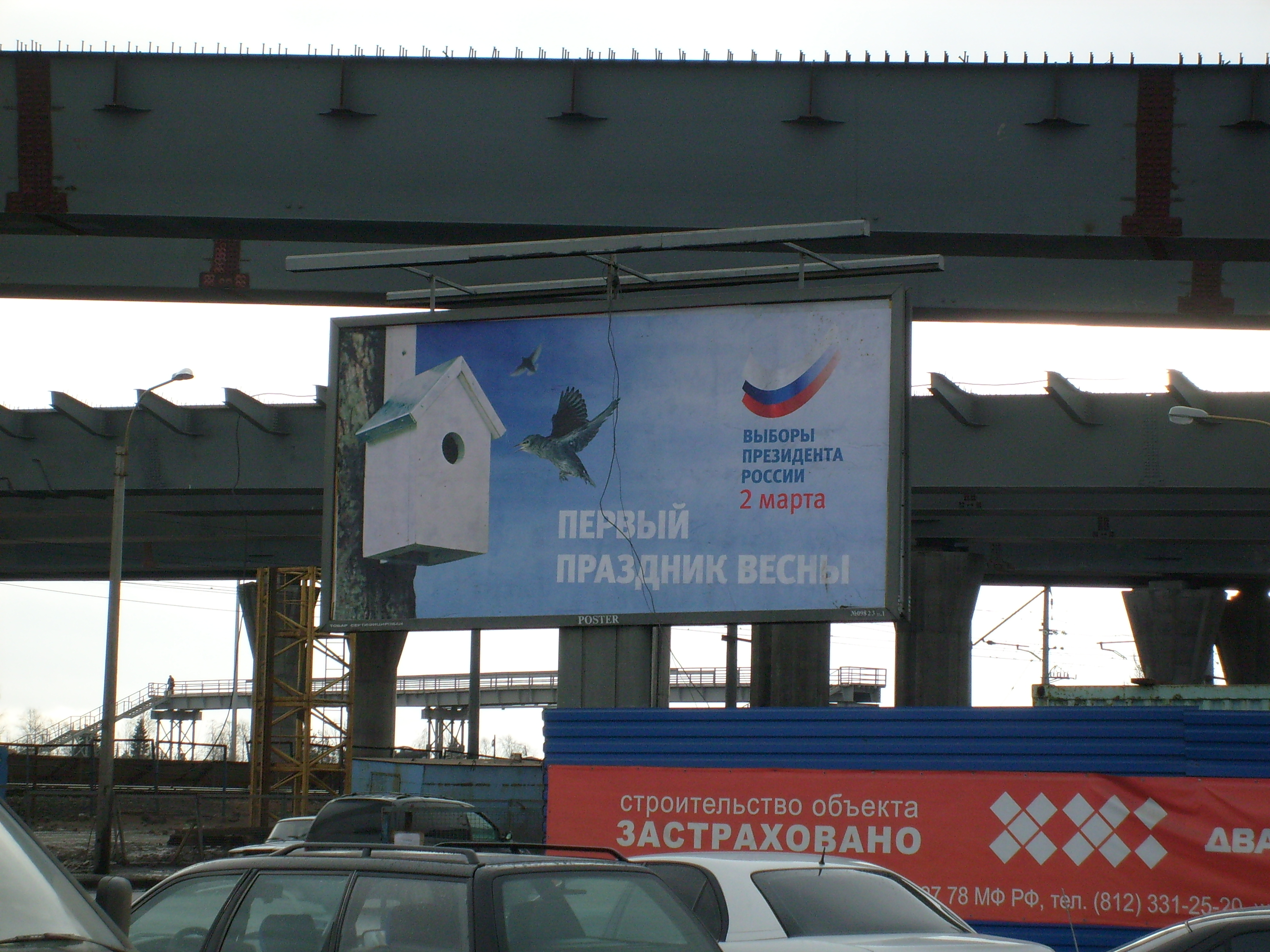
Campaign poster of the Central Election Commission for the 2008 Presidential Elections

== See also ==
- Institute for Election Systems Development
