= Semyon Aralov =

Russian revolutionary, military commander and Soviet diplomat

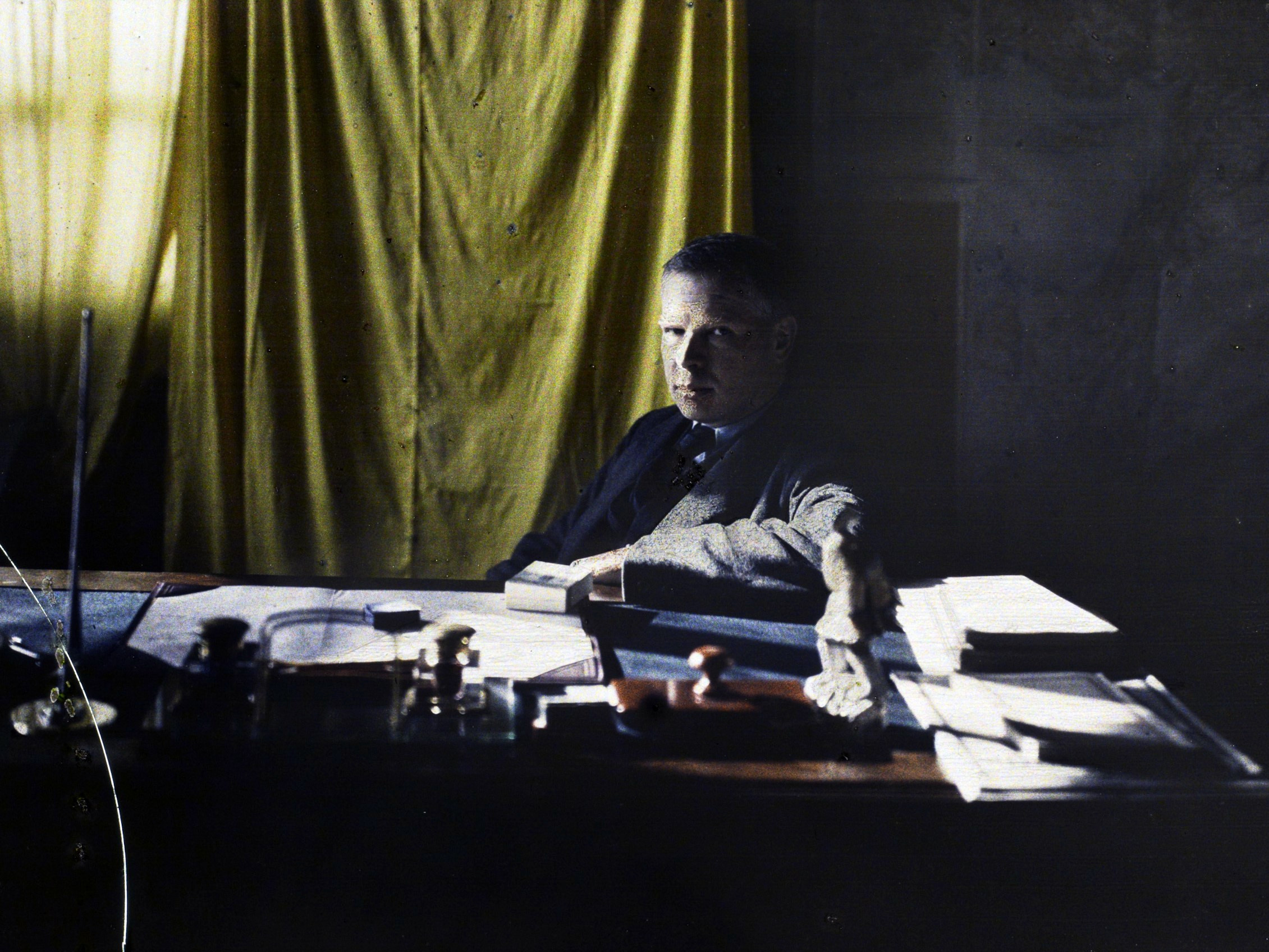
Aralov in Ankara, Autochrome by Frédéric Gadmer, 1922

Semyon Ivanovich Aralov (Russian: Семён Ива́нович Ара́лов; 18 December 1880 – 22 May 1969) was a Russian revolutionary, military commander and Soviet diplomat who served as the first head of the Soviet Red Army Intelligence Directorate and subsequently had a career in the Soviet diplomatic service.

Aralov was born in Moscow, the son of a wealthy merchant. He became a member of the Russian Social Democratic Labour Party in 1902. He also joined the Imperial Russian Army in 1905 and during the First World War he was promoted to the rank of Major in the Military Intelligence department. He participated in the October Revolution

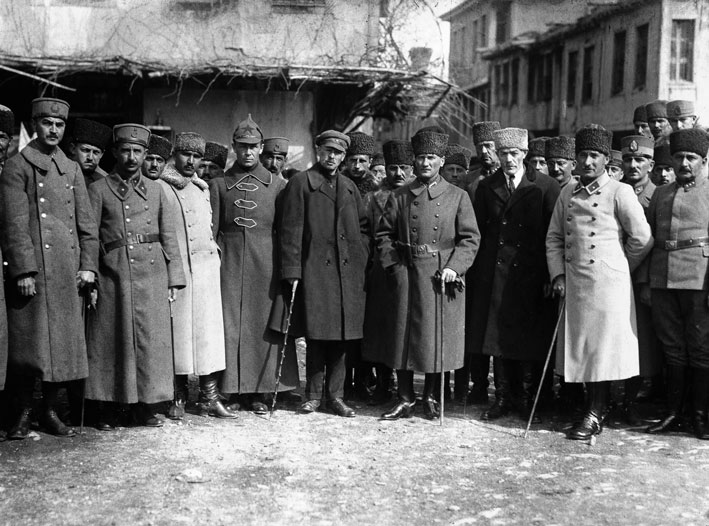
Mustafa Kemal's visit to Çay. From left to right: chief of staff of the Western Front Miralay Asim Bey (Gündüz), commander of the Western Front Mirliva Ismet Pasha (İnönü), unknown, military attaché of the Soviet Russia K.K. Zvonarev, ambassador of Soviet Russia S.I. Aralov, Mustafa Kemal Pasha, ambassador of Azerbaijan SSR Ibrahim Abilov, commander of First Army Mirliva Ali Ihsan Pasha (Sâbis), in the morning of 31 March 1922.

Aralov was a founding member of the Cheka and in January 1918 he was appointed head of the Moscow Military District. Trotsky then sent him to Siberia to lead negotiations with the Czechoslovak Legion. By September 1918, he was appointed to the Military Revolutionary Committee and in charge of hostage taking, whereby the Red Army seized family members of former Tsarist officers whose loyalty they doubted. When the Registration Unit, as the Red Army Intelligence Directorate was originally called, was founded in October 1918, he was the head, joining Trotsky and Jukums Vācietis on the Executive Bureau of the Defence Council.

In July 1920, Aralov relinquished his role as head of the GRU taking up an operational role as head of intelligence with the 12th Army and between 1921 and 1927 interspersed his role as deputy head with various foreign assignments, often under diplomatic cover. This included working as ambassador to Lithuania, Latvia and Turkey before going to China as an ambassador to Chiang Kai-shek's Kuomintang Government. His subsequent diplomatic career included postings in the United States, Germany and Japan.

During the purges of 1937, he was dismissed from all intelligence posts. However, he was able to gain the post of a deputy director of the Literature Museum. He volunteered for service in the Second World War at age 60 in 1941 and was discharged in 1946. He was involved in Communist Party work until retiring in 1957.

He died in Moscow in 1969 and was interred at the Novodevichy Cemetery.
