= Isaak van Brinen =

Russian diplomat (1768–1848)

- Исаак ван Бринен
- Born: 12 August 1768
- Died: 21 December 1848 (aged 80); Stockholm, Sweden
- Awards: Order of Saint Vladimir 1st, 2nd, and 3rd classes Order of the Polar Star

Isaak Abramovich van Brinen (Russian: Исаак Абрамович ван Бринен; 12 August 1768 – 2 December 1848) was a Russian diplomat. He was Privy Councillor starting in 1846. He was also a member of the State Council of the Russian Empire.

== Biography ==
Isaak van Brinen was part of a Dutch merchant family, members of which had settled in Arkhangelsk at the beginning of the 18th century. He was the son of Abraham van Brinen (1702–1792), who had been general consul of Austria in Arkhangelsk, and Elisabeth Vernezobr.

In 1791, van Brinen joined the Collegium of Foreign Affairs of the Russian Empire. From 1804, he was an adviser to the chancellery, from 1806 he was the secretary of the mission in Copenhagen. In 1815–1816, during the absence of the envoy, he worked as a chargé d'affaires of the Russian Empire in Denmark. In 1819, he was appointed Consul General in Stockholm. In 1840, he retired with the rank of Active State Councillor, but remained in Stockholm, where he died.

Van Brinen is buried in the cemetery of Solna, now part of Stockholm.

== Awards ==
For his service he was awarded the Russian Order of Saint Vladimir in all three classes, as well as the Swedish Order of the Polar Star.

== Links ==
- Isaak Abramovitj van Brienen
- Дипломаты Российской империи
