= Vladimir Churov =

Russian official and politician (1953–2023)

- Владимир Чуров
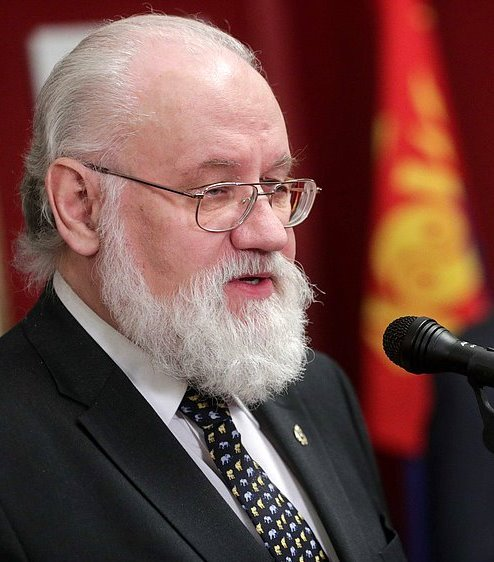
- Churov in 2019

Chairman of the Central Election Commission of Russia
- In office 27 March 2007 – 27 March 2016
- Preceded by: Alexander Veshnyakov
- Succeeded by: Ella Pamfilova

Personal details
- Born: Vladimir Yevgenyevich Churov; 17 March 1953 Leningrad, Russian SFSR, Soviet Union
- Died: 22 March 2023 (aged 70) Moscow, Russia
- Resting place: Federal Military Memorial Cemetery
- Education: Leningrad State University

Vladimir Yevgenyevich Churov (Russian: Владимир Евгеньевич Чуров; 17 March 1953 – 22 March 2023) was a Russian official and politician. From March 2007 to March 2016, he served as a member (delegated by the State Duma) and the chairman of the Central Election Commission of Russia. He was associated with mass falsifications of Russian elections. From June 2016 he worked as an Ambassador for Special Tasks at the Russian Ministry of Foreign Affairs.

== Early life and education ==
Churov was born in Leningrad, Soviet Union, in 1953. In 1977 he graduated from the Department of Physics at Leningrad State University.

== Career ==
=== Early career ===
From 1992 to 2003, he worked on the Committee for External Relations of the Saint Petersburg Mayor's Office, in 1992–1996 under Vladimir Putin, in 1995–2003 as a deputy head of the committee. According to Marina Salye, Churov worked for the KGB.

=== State Duma ===
Following the 2003 Russian legislative election he was a deputy in the 4th convocation of the State Duma (of LDPR faction) from December 2003 to March 2007.

On 30 January 2007, amendments to the Russian election legislation, which would allow people without a law degree to become members of the Central Election Commission, were passed by the President of Russia. This enabled Churov, who had no relevant experience, to be elected to the commission.

=== Loyalty to Putin ===
From the beginning, Churov created an image of a person who would remain loyal to president Putin under any circumstances. During his tenure, he made a number of controversial statements, which were interpreted as his willingness to rubber-stamp election results favorable to Putin even if there were reports of widespread violations. Participation of independent observers was made considerably more complicated. In the 2011 Russian legislative election, Churov maintained that the elections were free of falsifications, although the media reported a number of instances when the data of Central Election Commission of Russia differed with the protocols of election districts. One of the demands during the 2011–2013 Russian protests was the resignation of Churov. On the other hand, according to Alexander Kynev, the Central Electoral Committee did not falsify the results itself, and Churov was even instrumental in creating the efficient appeal system, which helped to strike down some decisions of lower level electoral committees. In any case, Churov became the symbolic figure representing mass falsifications in Russian elections at all levels.

=== Foreign affairs role ===
On 27 March 2016, the executive term of Churov expired, and he was not reappointed by Putin. Ella Pamfilova became the new chairperson of the Central Election Commission of Russia.

In June 2016 Churov was appointed as an ambassador-at-large for special tasks at the Russian Ministry for Foreign Affairs.

== Death ==
Vladimir Churov died from a heart attack in Moscow, on 22 March 2023, at the age of 70. He was buried at the Federal Military Memorial Cemetery on 24 March 2023.

Political offices
Preceded by Alexander Veshnyakov	Chairman of the Central Election Commission of Russia; 26 March 2007 – 26 March 2016	Succeeded by Ella Pamfilova
