= Basic Constitutional Charter on the Independence and Sovereignty of the Republic of Slovenia =

Constitutional Charter of Slovenia

The Basic Constitutional Charter on the Independence and Sovereignty of the Republic of Slovenia (Slovene: Temeljna ustavna listina o samostojnosti in neodvisnosti Republike Slovenije or shortly Temeljna ustavna listina, acronym TUL) is the fundamental document of Slovenian independence, adopted by the then Slovenian Assembly on 25 June 1991. It declared Slovenia's independence and transferred onto it some of the powers of Slovenia previously held by the Socialist Federal Republic of Yugoslavia, recognised its existing borders as national borders, guaranteed the protection of human rights to all citizens, and also provided special protection to members of minorities, as provided for in inter-state treaties. Together with the Declaration of Independence of Slovenia and several laws by which Slovenia took over the former competences of the federation on its territory, it constitutes the foundation of Slovenian statehood.

== Gallery ==
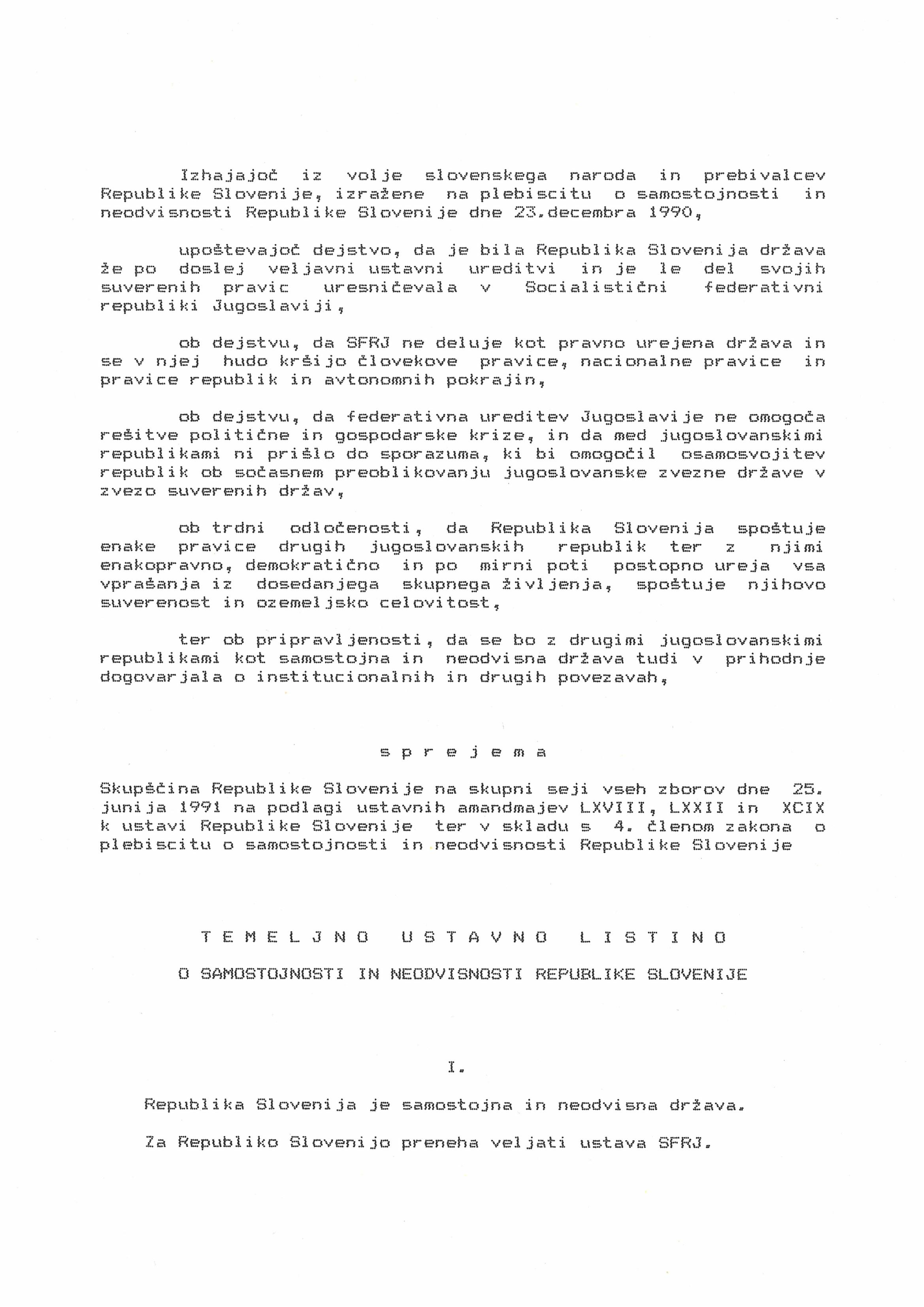
First page of the charter

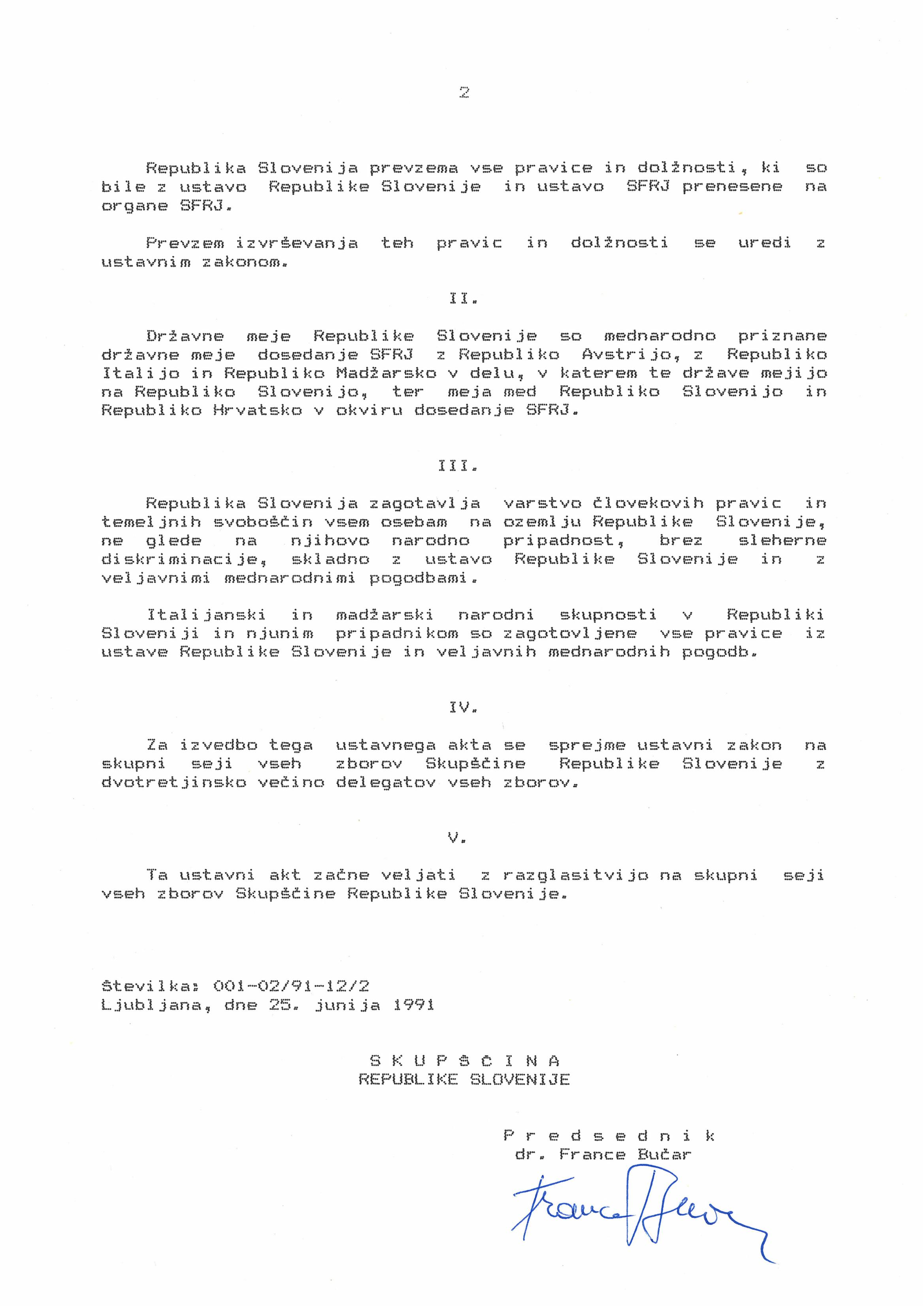
Second page of the charter
