= Viktor Chernomyrdin's Second Cabinet =

Second cabinet of Viktor Chernomyrdin
- 44th Cabinet of Russia

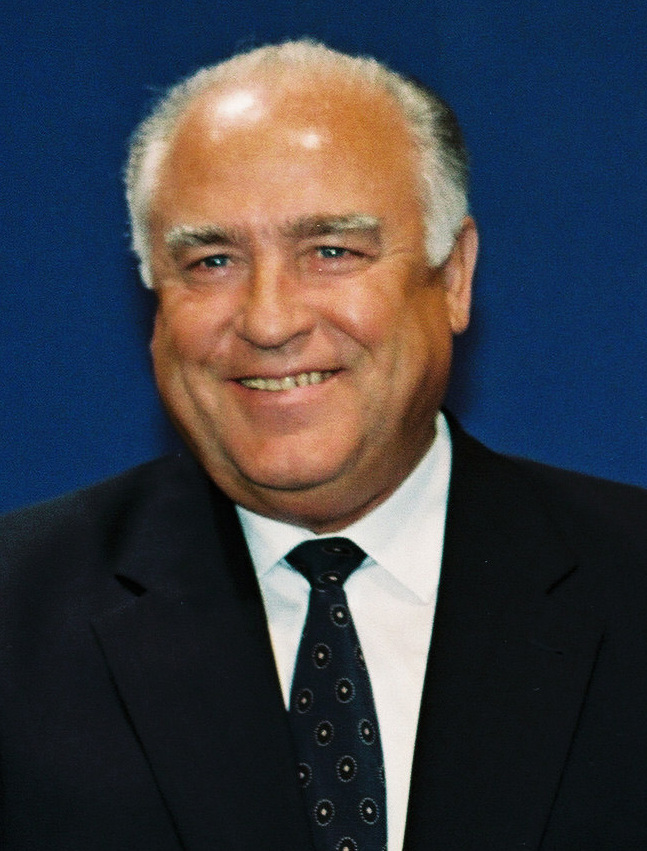
- Date formed: 10 August 1996
- Date dissolved: 23 March 1998

People and organisations
- Head of state: Boris Yeltsin; Viktor Chernomyrdin (briefly acting)
- Head of government: Viktor Chernomyrdin; Sergey Kiriyenko (acting)
- Deputy head of government: Anatoly Chubais
- No. of ministers: 27
- Member party: Our Home – Russia; Democratic Choice of Russia; Socialist Party; Congress of Russian Communities
- Status in legislature: Coalition
- Opposition party: Communist Party
- Opposition leader: Gennady Zuganov

History
- Predecessor: Chernomyrdin I
- Successor: Kiriyenko

Viktor Chernomyrdin's Second Cabinet acted under President Boris Yeltsin from August 10, 1996, until March 23, 1998. The State Duma overwhelmingly confirmed reappointment of Chernomyrdin as head of the Cabinet, with 314 deputies voting in favor, far more than the simple majority of 216 needed for approval and 85 deputies were opposed.

== Composition ==
Post	Image	Name	Party	Period
Prime Minister		Viktor Chernomyrdin	Our Home – Russia	10 August 1996 – 23 March 1998
Deputy Prime Ministers
First Deputy Prime Minister		Alexei Bolshakov	Independent	14 August 1996 – 17 March 1997
First Deputy Prime Minister		Viktor Ilyushin	Independent	14 August 1996 – 17 March 1997
First Deputy Prime Minister		Vladimir Potanin	Independent	14 August 1996 – 17 March 1997
First Deputy Prime Minister		Anatoly Chubais	Democratic Choice of Russia	17 March 1997 – 23 March 1998
First Deputy Prime Minister		Boris Nemtsov	Independent	17 March 1997 – 23 March 1998
Deputy Prime Minister – Chief of Staff of the Government		Vladimir Babichev	Our Home – Russia	10 August 1996 – 17 March 1997
Deputy Prime Minister		Oleg Davydov		10 August 1996 – 17 March 1997
Deputy Prime Minister		Vitaly Ignatenko		10 August 1996 – 17 March 1997
Deputy Prime Minister		Alexander Zaveryukha		10 August 1996 – 17 March 1997
Deputy Prime Minister		Oleg Lobov		14 August 1996 – 17 March 1997
Deputy Prime Minister		Aleksandr Livshits		14 August 1996 – 17 March 1997
Deputy Prime Minister		Valery Serov		14 August 1996 – 28 February 1998
Deputy Prime Minister		Vladimir Fortov	Our Home – Russia	17 August 1996 – 17 March 1997
Deputy Prime Minister		Anatoly Kulikov		4 February 1997 – 23 March 1998
Deputy Prime Minister		Oleg Sysuyev	Our Home – Russia	17 March 1997 – 13 March 1998
Deputy Prime Minister		Alfred Koch		17 March 1997 – 13 August 1997
Deputy Prime Minister		Yakov Urinson		17 March 1997 – 23 March 1998
Deputy Prime Minister		Vladimir Bulgak	Our Home – Russia	17 March 1997 – 23 March 1998
Deputy Prime Minister		Viktor Khlystun		19 May 1997 – 23 March 1998
Deputy Prime Minister		Ramazan Abdulatipov	Party of Russian Unity and Accord	1 August 1997 – 23 March 1998
Deputy Prime Minister		Maxim Boyko		13 August 1997 – 15 November 1997
Deputy Prime Minister		Farit Gazizullin		20 December 1997 – 23 March 1998
Deputy Prime Minister		Ivan Rybkin	Socialist Party of Russia	2 March 1998 – 23 March 1998
Federal Ministers
Minister of Agriculture		Viktor Khlystun		10 August 1996 – 23 March 1998
Minister of Atomic Energy		Viktor Mikhaylov		14 August 1996 – 2 March 1998
Minister of Atomic Energy		Yevgeny Adamov		2 March 1998 – 23 March 1998
Minister of Communications		Vladimir Bulgak	Our Home – Russia	14 August 1996 – 17 March 1997
Minister for Cooperation with Member States of the CIS		Aman Tuleyev	Independent	22 August 1996 – 1 July 1997
Minister for Cooperation with Member States of the CIS		Anatoly Adamishin		28 August 1997 – 23 March 1998
Minister of Culture		Yevgeny Sidorov	Our Home – Russia	22 August 1996 – 28 August 1997
Minister of Culture		Natalia Dementyeva		28 August 1997 – 23 March 1998
Minister of Defence		Igor Rodionov		10 August 1996 – 22 May 1997
Minister of Defence		Igor Sergeyev		22 May 1997 – 23 March 1998
Minister of Defence Industry		Zinovy Pak		14 August 1996 – 17 March 1997
Minister of Economy		Yevgeny Yasin		10 August 1996 – 17 March 1997
Minister of Economy		Yakov Urinson		17 March 1997 – 23 March 1998
Ministry of General and Professional Education		Vladimir Kinelyov	Our Home – Russia	14 August 1996 – 28 February 1998
Ministry of General and Professional Education		Aleksandr Tikhonov		2 March 1998 – 23 March 1998
Minister of Emergency Situations		Sergei Shoigu	Our Home – Russia	10 August 1996 – 23 March 1998
Minister for Ethnicities and Federal Relations		Vyacheslav Mikhailov		14 August 1996 – 23 March 1998
Minister of Finance		Aleksandr Livshits	Independent	15 August 1996 – 17 March 1997
Minister of Finance		Anatoly Chubais	Democratic Choice of Russia	17 March 1997 – 20 November 1997
Minister of Finance		Mikhail Zadornov	Independent	20 November 1997 – 23 March 1998
Minister of Foreign Affairs		Yevgeny Primakov	Independent	10 August 1996 – 23 March 1998
Minister of Foreign Economic Relations		Oleg Davydov		14 August 1996 – 1 April 1997
Minister of Foreign Economic Relations and Trade		Mikhail Fradkov		16 April 1997 – 23 March 1998
Minister of Fuel and Energy		Pyotr Rodionov		22 August 1996 – 9 April 1997
Minister of Fuel and Energy		Boris Nemtsov	Independent	24 April 1997 – 20 November 1997
Minister of Fuel and Energy		Sergey Kiriyenko	Independent	20 November 1997 – 23 March 1998
Minister of Health and Social Development		Tatyana Dmitrieva	Our Home – Russia	22 August 1996 – 23 March 1998
Minister of Industry		Yuri Bespalov		10 August 1996 – 17 March 1997
Minister of Internal Affairs		Anatoly Kulikov	Independent	10 August 1996 – 23 March 1998
Minister of Justice		Valentin Kovalyov		10 August 1996 – 2 July 1997
Minister of Justice		Sergey Stepashin		2 July 1997 – 23 March 1998
Minister of Labour and Social Development		Gennady Melikyan	Our Home – Russia	14 August 1996 – 14 April 1997
Minister of Labour and Social Development		Oleg Sysuyev	Our Home – Russia	14 April 1997 – 23 March 1998
Minister of Natural Resources		Viktor Orlov		22 August 1996 – 23 March 1998
Minister of Railways		Anatoly Zaytsev		22 August 1996 – 14 April 1997
Minister of Railways		Nikolay Aksyonenko		14 April 1997 – 23 March 1998
Minister of Science and Technology		Vladimir Fortov	Our Home – Russia	17 March 1997 – 23 March 1998
Minister of State Property		Maxim Boyko		30 September 1997 – 15 November 1997
Minister of State Property		Farit Gazizullin		20 December 1997 – 23 March 1998
Minister of Transport		Nikolai Tsakh		10 August 1996 – 28 February 1998
Minister of Transport		Sergey Frank		28 February 1998 – 23 March 1998
Chief of Staff of the Government – Minister of the Russian Federation		Vladimir Babichev	Our Home – Russia	17 March 1997 – 23 March 1998
