= Viktor Chernomyrdin's First Cabinet =

First cabinet of Viktor Chernomyrdin
- 43rd Cabinet of Russia

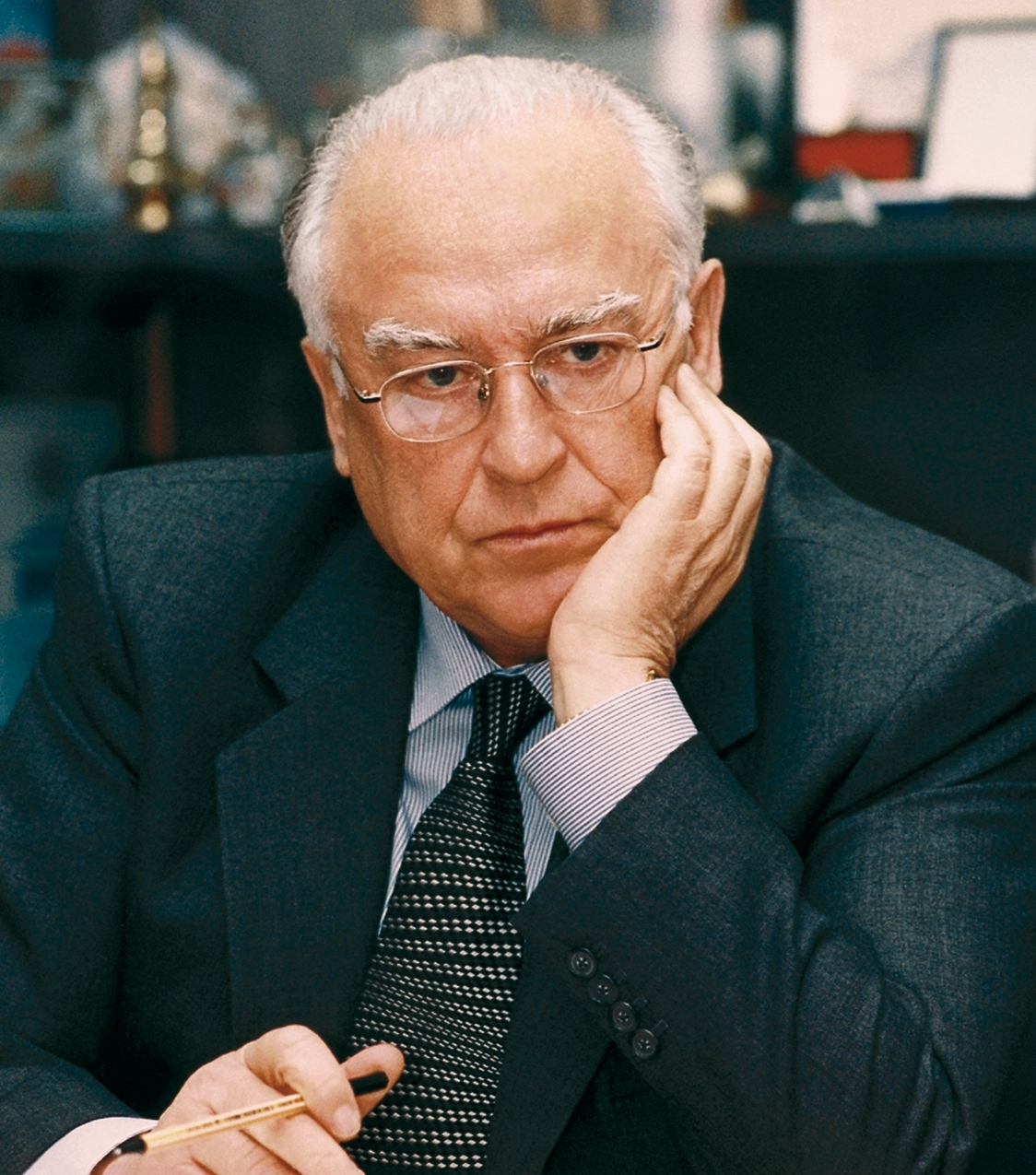
- Date formed: 23 December 1992
- Date dissolved: 9 August 1996

People and organisations
- Head of state: Boris Yeltsin
- Head of government: Viktor Chernomyrdin
- Deputy head of government: Vladimir Shumeyko; Oleg Lobov; Oleg Soskovets; Yegor Gaidar; Anatoly Chubais; Vladimir Kadannikov
- No. of ministers: 30
- Member party: Our Home - Russia; Russia's Choice; Agrarian Party; Party of Russian Unity and Accord; Democratic Party
- Status in legislature: Coalition 231 / 450
- Opposition party: Liberal Democratic Party (1992–1995); Communist Party (1992–1996)
- Opposition leader: Vladimir Zhirinovsky (1992–1995); Gennady Zyuganov (1992–1996)

History
- Predecessor: Yeltsin – Gaidar
- Successor: Chernomyrdin II

Viktor Chernomyrdin's First Cabinet acted under President of Russia Boris Yeltsin from 23 December 1992 to August 9, 1996. Until December 25, 1993 the official name was Council of Ministers, and since that date, with the coming into law of the Constitution of Russia under the term "Government".

During the formation of the cabinet, a number of Gaidar loyalists resigned from their posts.

== Composition ==
Portfolio	Minister	Took office	Left office	Party
Prime Minister	Viktor Chernomyrdin	14 December 1992	9 August 1996	NDR
First Deputy Prime Ministers	Vladimir Shumeyko	23 December 1992	12 December 1993	Independent
First Deputy Prime Ministers	Oleg Lobov	15 April 1993; 18 June 1996	18 September 1993; 14 August 1996	Independent
First Deputy Prime Ministers	Oleg Soskovets	30 April 1993	20 June 1996	NDR
First Deputy Prime Ministers	Yegor Gaidar	18 September 1993	12 December 1993	Independent
First Deputy Prime Ministers	Anatoly Chubais	5 November 1994	16 January 1996	DVR
First Deputy Prime Ministers	Vladimir Kadannikov	25 January 1996	9 August 1996	NDR
Deputy Prime Ministers	Alexander Shokhin	23 December 1992	20 January 1994	Independent
Deputy Prime Ministers	Georgy Khizha	2 December 1992	11 May 1993	Independent
Deputy Prime Ministers	Boris Saltykov	23 December 1992	25 March 1993	Independent
Deputy Prime Ministers	Sergey Shakhray	23 December 1992	20 January 1994	Independent
Deputy Prime Ministers	Yury Yarov	23 December 1992	24 July 1996	DVR
Deputy Prime Ministers	Boris Fyodorov	23 December 1992	20 January 1994	Independent
Deputy Prime Ministers	Alexander Zaveryukha	10 February 1993	9 August 1996	APR
Minister of Agriculture	Viktor Khlystun	20 January 1994	27 October 1994	Independent
Minister of Agriculture	Aleksandr Nazarchuk	27 October 1994	12 January 1996	APR
Minister of Agriculture	Alexander Zaveryukha	12 January 1996	14 May 1996	APR
Minister of Agriculture	Viktor Khlystun	14 May 1996	9 August 1996	Independent
Minister of Atomic Energy	Viktor Mikhaylov	23 December 1992	9 August 1996	Independent
Minister of Communications	Vladimir Bulgak	23 December 1992	9 August 1996	Independent
Minister of Construction	Yefim Basin	12 July 1994	9 August 1996	Independent
Minister for Cooperation with CIS Member States	Vladimir Mashits (acting)	27 January 1994	16 February 1995	Independent
Minister for Cooperation with CIS Member States	Valery Serov	16 February 1995	9 August 1996	Independent
Minister of Culture	Yevgeny Sidorov	23 December 1992	9 August 1996	Independent
Minister of Defence	Pavel Grachev	23 December 1992	18 June 1996	Independent
Minister of Defence	Igor Rodionov	17 July 1996	9 August 1996	Independent
Minister of Defence Industry	Zinovy Pak	8 May 1996	9 August 1996	Independent
Minister of Economy	Andrey Nechaev	23 December 1992	25 March 1993	Independent
Minister of Economy	Oleg Lobov	15 April 1993	18 September 1993	Independent
Minister of Economy	Alexander Shokhin	20 January 1994	6 November 1994	Party of Russian Unity and Accord
Minister of Economy	Yevgeny Yasin	8 November 1994	9 August 1996	Independent
Minister of Education	Yevgeny Tkachenko	23 December 1992	9 August 1996	Independent
Minister of Emergency Situations	Sergei Shoigu	23 December 1992	9 August 1996	Independent
Minister of Environmental Protection and Natural Resources	Viktor Danilov-Danilyan	23 December 1992	9 August 1996	KEDR
Minister of Foreign Affairs	Andrey Kozyrev	23 December 1992	5 January 1996	Independent
Minister of Foreign Affairs	Yevgeny Primakov	10 January 1996	9 August 1996	Independent
Minister of Foreign Economic Relations	Sergey Glazyev	23 December 1992	22 September 1993	DPR
Minister of Foreign Economic Relations	Oleg Davydov	22 September 1993	9 August 1996	Independent
Minister of Fuel and Energy	Yury Shafranik	12 January 1993	9 August 1996	Independent
Minister of Health	Eduard Nechayev	23 December 1992	28 November 1995	Independent
Minister of Health	Aleksandr Tsaregorodtsev	5 December 1995	9 August 1996	Independent
Minister of Internal Affairs	Viktor Yerin	23 December 1992	30 June 1995	Independent
Minister of Internal Affairs	Anatoly Kulikov	6 July 1995	9 August 1996	Independent
Minister of Justice	Nikolay Fyodorov	23 December 1992	24 March 1993	Independent
Minister of Justice	Yuri Kalmykov	13 April 1993	7 December 1994	Party of Russian Unity and Accord
Minister of Justice	Valentin Kovalyov	5 January 1995	9 August 1996	Independent
Minister of Labour	Gennady Melikyan	23 December 1992	9 August 1996	Party of Russian Unity and Accord
Minister of Nationalities	Sergey Shakhray	20 January 1994	16 May 1994	Party of Russian Unity and Accord
Minister of Nationalities	Nikolai Yegorov	16 May 1994	30 June 1995	Independent
Minister of Nationalities	Vyacheslav Mikhailov	5 July 1995	9 August 1996	Independent
Minister of Railways	Gennady Fadeyev	23 December 1992	9 August 1996	Independent
Minister of Science	Boris Saltykov	25 March 1993	9 August 1996	Independent
Minister of Security	Viktor Barannikov	23 December 1992	27 July 1993	Independent
Minister of Security	Nikolai Golushko (acting)	28 July 1993	21 December 1993	Independent
Minister of Social Protection	Ella Pamfilova	23 December 1992	2 March 1994	Independent
Minister of Social Protection	Lyudmila Bezlepkina	4 May 1994	9 August 1996	Independent
Minister of Transport	Vitaly Efimov	23 December 1992	10 January 1996	Independent
Minister of Transport	Nikolai Tsakh	12 January 1996	9 August 1996	Independent
Chief of Staff of the Government	Vladimir Kvasov	12 January 1993	11 November 1994	Independent
Chief of Staff of the Government	Vladimir Babichev	15 November 1994	9 August 1996	NDR
Member of the Government	Nikolay Travkin	29 April 1994	10 January 1996	DPR
