= First Deputy Prime Minister of Russia =

Member of the Russian Government

First Deputy Chairman of the Government of the Russian Federation
- Первый заместитель Председателя Правительства Российской Федерации
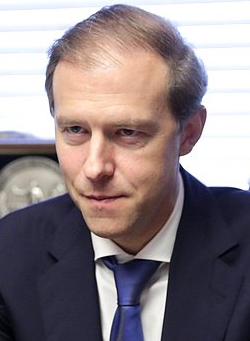
- Incumbent; Denis Manturov since 14 May 2024
- Style: Mr First Deputy Chairman (informal); His Excellency (diplomatic)
- Residence: White House, Moscow
- Nominator: Prime Minister
- Appointer: President
- Term length: No fixed term
- Inaugural holder: Gennady Burbulis
- Formation: 6 November 1991; 34 years ago

A First Deputy Chairman of the Government of the Russian Federation (Russian: Первый заместитель Председателя Правительства Российской Федерации, romanized: Pervy zamestitel Predsedatelya Pravitelstva Rossiyskoy Federatsii), commonly referred to as the First Deputy Prime Minister, is a member of the Russian Government. The First Deputy is to be proposed by the Prime Minister, and approved by the President. However, this office is not provisioned by Constitution and it is not a separate office.

The Chapter 6 of the Constitution of Russia says, that "The Government of the Russian Federation consists of the Chairman of the Government of the Russian Federation, Deputy Chairman of the Government of the Russian Federation and federal ministries". First of all, First Vice-Premier is Vice-Premier, all others are distribution of responsibilities among Vice-Premiers inside the Government. There can be more than one First Vice-Premier, therefore written distribution of responsibilities is the most important document. The Federal constitutional law "On the Government of the Russian Federation" says "in the case of temporary absence of the Chairman of the Government of the Russian Federation, his duties are performed by one of the Deputy Chairmen of the Government of the Russian Federation in accordance with a written distribution of responsibilities". It's automatically and President's Executive Order is not required in that moment.

== List ==
First Deputy PM	Party	Term of Office		Other offices held while First Deputy PM	Cabinet
Gennady Burbulis	Independent	6 November 1991	14 April 1992	Secretary of State	Yeltsin—Gaidar
Yegor Gaidar	Independent	2 March 1992	15 December 1992	Minister of Finance (to 2 April); Acting Prime Minister (from 15 June to 14 December)	Yeltsin—Gaidar
Vladimir Shumeyko	Independent	2 June 1992	20 January 1994	Minister of Press (from 5 October 1993)	Yeltsin—Gaidar; Chernomyrdin I
Oleg Lobov	Independent	15 April 1993	18 September 1993	Minister of Economy	Chernomyrdin I
Yegor Gaidar	Choice of Russia	18 September 1993	20 January 1994	Acting Minister of Economy	Chernomyrdin I
Oleg Soskovets	Independent	30 April 1993	20 June 1996	none	Chernomyrdin I
Anatoly Chubais	Democratic Choice	5 November 1994	16 January 1996	none	Chernomyrdin I
Vladimir Kadannikov	Independent	25 January 1996	9 August 1996	none	Chernomyrdin I
Oleg Lobov	Independent	18 June 1996	14 August 1996	Presidential Representative in Chechnya	Chernomyrdin I
Alexei Bolshakov	Independent	14 August 1996	17 March 1997	none	Chernomyrdin II
Viktor Ilyushin	Independent	14 August 1996	17 March 1997	none	Chernomyrdin II
Vladimir Potanin	Independent	14 August 1996	17 March 1997	none	Chernomyrdin II
Anatoly Chubais	Democratic Choice	7 March 1997	23 March 1998	Minister of Finance (to 20 November 1997)	Chernomyrdin II
Boris Nemtsov	Independent	17 March 1997	18 April 1998	Minister of Energy (24 April – 20 November 1997)	Chernomyrdin II; Kiriyenko
Sergey Kiriyenko	Independent	23 March 1998	24 April 1998	Acting Prime Minister (Note: A candidate for the prime minister should be a deputy prime minister in an outgoing cabinet. If he is not, he would be appointed as such shortly before the cabinet's dismissal. This led to a situation when the same person acts as interim prime minister and deputy to himself until official approval of the new PM by the State Duma. Статья №8 от 17 декабря 1997 «Федеральный конституционный закон № 2-ФКЗ «О Правительстве Российской Федерации»». (Article #8 of 17 December 1997 Federal Constitutional Law No. 2-FKZ "On the Government of the Russian Federation". ).)	Kiriyenko
Yuri Maslyukov	Communist Party	11 September 1998	12 May 1999	none	Primakov
Vadim Gustov	Independent	18 September 1998	27 April 1999	none	Primakov
Sergey Stepashin	Independent	27 April 1999	12 May 1999	Minister of Internal Affairs	Primakov
Nikolay Aksyonenko	Independent	21 May 1999	10 January 2000	Minister of Railways	Stepashin; Putin I
Mikhail Zadornov	Independent	25 May 1999	28 May 1999	Minister of Finance	Stepashin
Viktor Khristenko	Independent	31 May 1999	10 January 2000	none	Stepashin; Putin I
Vladimir Putin	Independent	9 August 1999	16 August 1999	Acting Prime Minister	Putin I
Mikhail Kasyanov	Independent	10 January 2000	17 May 2000	Minister of Finance	Putin I
Dmitry Medvedev	Independent	14 November 2005	7 May 2008	none	Fradkov II; Zubkov
Sergei Ivanov	United Russia	15 February 2007	7 May 2008	none	Fradkov II; Zubkov
Viktor Zubkov	United Russia	12 May 2008	7 May 2012	Chairman of the Board of Gazprom (from 27 June 2008)	Putin II
Igor Shuvalov	Independent	12 May 2008	18 May 2018	none	Putin II; Medvedev I
Anton Siluanov	United Russia	18 May 2018	15 January 2020	Minister of Finance	Medvedev II
Andrey Belousov	Independent	21 January 2020	7 May 2024	Acting Prime Minister (30 April – 19 May 2020)	Mishustin I
Denis Manturov	Independent	14 May 2024	Incumbent	none	Mishustin II

== First Deputy Premiers of the Russian SFSR ==
First Deputy	Term of Office		Other offices held while First Deputy	Premier
Aleksandr Smirnov	20 February 1928	3 November 1929	none	Rykov; Syrtsov
Dmitry Lebed	7 February 1930	August 1937	none	Syrtsov; Sulimov
Georgy Perov	June 1943	November 1944	none	Kosygin
Vasily Pronin	November 1944	23 March 1946	none	Kosygin
Valentin Makarov	26 June 1948	12 July 1949	none	Rodionov; Chernousov
Arseny Safronov	12 July 1949	13 October 1957	none	Chernousov; Puzanov; Yasnov
Pavel Lobanov	15 August 1953	28 February 1955	Minister of Agriculture (from 20 December 1953)	Puzanov
Dmitry Alyokhin	26 March 1955	29 August 1957	none	Puzanov; Yasnov
Ivan Lebedev	26 March 1955	24 April 1956	none	Puzanov; Yasnov
Alexander Puzanov	24 January 1956	21 February 1957	none	Yasnov
Nikolai Baibakov	4 May 1957	7 May 1958	Chairman of the USSR State Committee for Planning	Yasnov; Kozlov; Polyansky
Mikhail Yasnov	19 December 1957	23 December 1966	none	Kozlov; Polyansky; Voronov
Vladimir Novikov	7 May 1958	16 April 1959	Chairman of the RSFSR State Committee for Planning	Polyansky
Nikolay Smirnov	24 March 1962	18 January 1964	Minister of Agricultural Production and Procurement	Voronov
Leonid Maximov	18 January 1964	19 December 1964	Minister of Agricultural Production and Procurement	Voronov
Konstantin Pysin	19 December 1964	1 February 1971	none	Voronov
Alexey Shkolnikov	10 November 1965	25 July 1974	none	Voronov; Solomentsev
Nikolay Vasilyev	18 February 1971	13 April 1979	none	Voronov; Solomentsev
Vitaly Vorotnikov	10 July 1975	4 April 1979	none	Solomentsev
Lev Yermin	18 April 1979	20 April 1989	Chairman of the RSFSR State Agroindustrial Committee (from 28 November 1985)	Solomentsev; Vorotnikov; Vlasov
Vladimir Orlov	18 April 1979	26 March 1985	none	Solomentsev; Vorotnikov
Vladimir Gusev	11 April 1985	20 June 1986	none	Vorotnikov; Vlasov
Fikryat Tabeyev	27 June 1986	15 May 1990	none	Vorotnikov; Vlasov
Yevgeny Sizenko	21 June 1989	14 July 1990	none	Vlasov; Silayev
Gennady Kulik	14 July 1990	10 July 1991	Minister of Agriculture and Food	Silayev
Yury Skokov	8 September 1990	10 July 1991	none	Silayev
Oleg Lobov	19 April 1991	15 November 1991	de facto Acting Premier (from 26 September)	Silayev

== Sources ==
- Rulers.org
