= Yevgeny Primakov's Cabinet =

Government of Russia from 1998 to 1999

Cabinet of Yevgeny Primakov
- 46th Cabinet of Russia

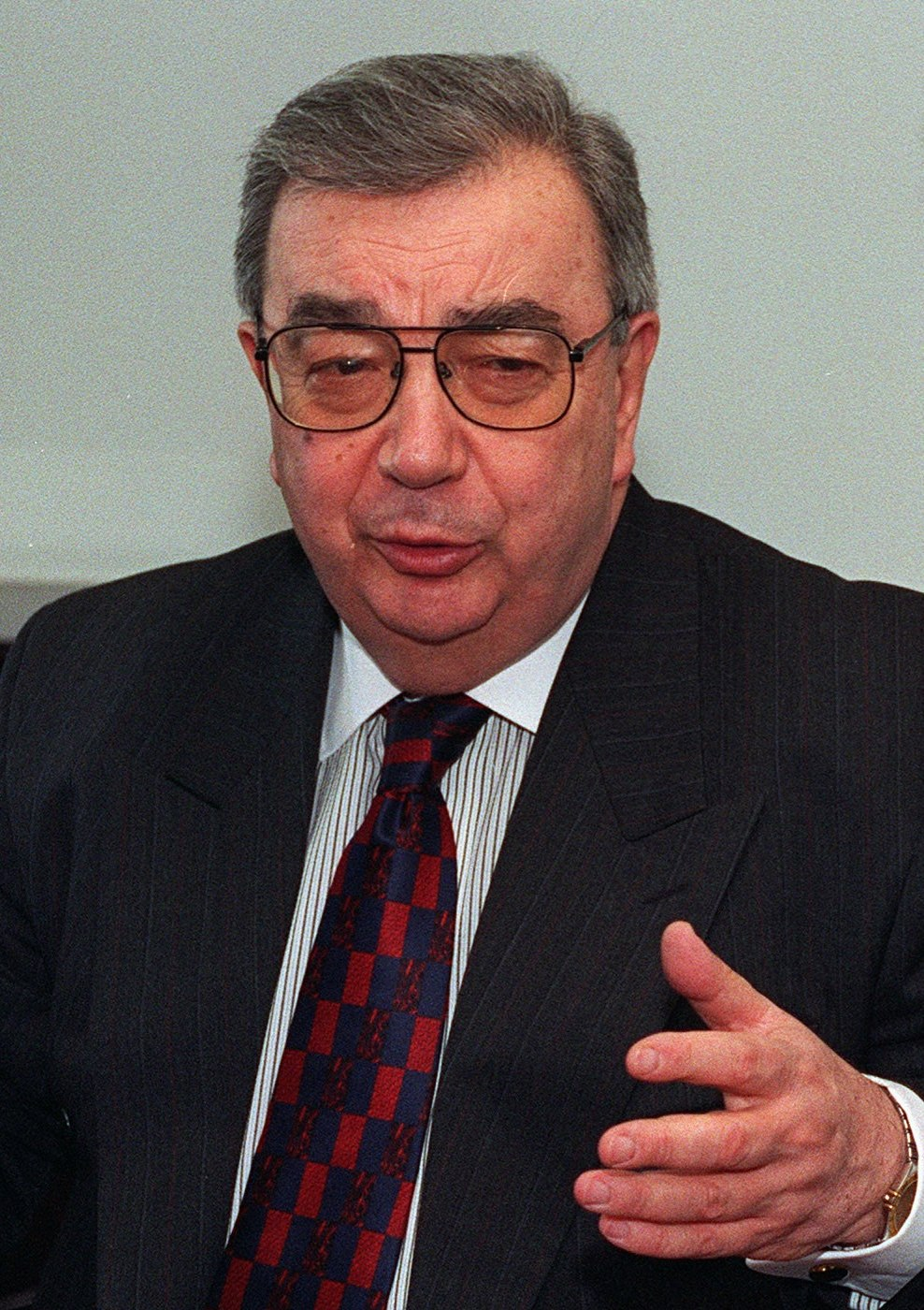
- Date formed: 11 September 1998
- Date dissolved: 12 May 1999

People and organisations
- Head of state: Boris Yeltsin
- Head of government: Yevgeny Primakov; Sergey Stepashin (acting)
- Deputy head of government: Yuri Maslyukov
- No. of ministers: 34
- Member party: Our Home - Russia; Fatherland – All Russia; Communist Party; Liberal Democratic Party; Agrarian Party
- Status in legislature: Coalition
- Opposition party: Yabloko
- Opposition leader: Grigory Yavlinsky

History
- Predecessor: Kirienko
- Successor: Stepashin

Yevgeny Primakov's Cabinet (11 September, 1998 – 12 May, 1999) was the seventh cabinet of government of the Russian Federation, preceded by Sergei Kiriyenko's Cabinet fallen as a result of the 1998 Russian financial crisis and followed by Sergei Stepashin's Cabinet. It was led by Prime Minister Yevgeny Primakov, proposed by President Boris Yeltsin on 10 September, 1998, as Viktor Chernomyrdin had failed to be approved by the State Duma twice by 7 September (31 August: 94 in favor, 252 against, nobody abstained, 7 September: 138 in favor, 273 against, 1 abstained) ; According to the Constitution of Russia, if parliament rejects the president's nomination three times, then parliament must be dissolved and a general election held. On September 11 Primakov was approved by the Duma as Prime Minister (317 in favor, 63 against, 15 abstained) and appointed Prime Minister by the President. In the State Duma only Vladimir Zhirinovsky's Liberal Democratic Party of Russia was both in favor of Chernomyrdin and against Primakov.

Fourteen ministers of the government out of thirty-one held positions in the previous cabinet: Primakov (Minister for External Affairs), Maslyukov (Minister of Industry and Trade), Bulgak (Minister of Science and Technology), Adamov, Stepashin, Gazizullin, Shoigu, Sergeyev, Aksyonenko, Semyonov, Generalov, Frank, Zadornov, Krasheninnikov (the same positions).

According to the Russian legislation, the ministers were appointed by the President.

On 12 May, 1999 Yeltsin sacked the government and Prime Minister and claimed that Primakov had failed to improve the economy after the 1998 Russian financial crisis. By then Primakov had become the most popular Russian politician. The real reason of the government reshuffle was considered linked to the upcoming start of impeachment hearings against Yeltsin in the State Duma (Primakov refused to fire ministers belonging to the Communist Party).

== Ministers ==
Portfolio	Minister	Took office	Left office	Party
Chairman of the Government	Yevgeny Primakov	11 September 1998	12 May 1999	Independent
Chairman of the Government	Sergei Stepashin	12 May 1999	19 May 1999	Independent
First Deputy Chairman of the Government for Economy and Finance	Yuri Maslyukov	11 September 1998	19 May 1999	CPRF
First Deputy Chairman of the Government for Regions, Youth and Nationalities	Vadim Gustov	18 September 1998	27 April 1999	Independent
First Deputy Chairman of the Government for Regions, Youth and Nationalities	Sergei Stepashin	27 April 1999	19 May 1999	Independent
First Deputy Chairman of the Government	Nikolay Aksyonenko	12 May 1999	19 May 1999	Independent
Deputy Chairman of the Government	Vladimir Bulgak	16 September 1998	19 May 1999	NDR
Deputy Chairman of the Government	Gennady Kulik	21 September 1998	19 May 1999	APR
Deputy Chairman of the Government	Valentina Matviyenko	24 September 1998	19 May 1999	Independent
Deputy Chairman of the Government	Viktor Khristenko	11 September 1998	28 September 1998	Independent
Deputy Chairman of the Government	Alexander Shokhin	16 September 1998	30 September 1998	Independent
State Taxes Service, Deputy Chairman of the Government	Boris Fyodorov	11 September 1998	28 September 1998	FR
Ministry of Foreign Affairs	Igor Ivanov	11 September 1998	19 May 1999	Independent
Ministry of Defence	Igor Sergeyev	11 September 1998	19 May 1999	Independent
Ministry of Internal Affairs	Sergei Stepashin	11 September 1998	19 May 1999	Independent
Ministry of Finance	Mikhail Zadornov	11 September 1998	19 May 1999	Independent
Ministry of Railways	Nikolay Aksyonenko	11 September 1998	19 May 1999	Independent
Ministry of General and Professional Education	Vladimir Filippov	30 September 1998	19 May 1999	Independent
Ministry of Emergency Situations	Sergei Shoigu	11 September 1998	19 May 1999	NDR
Ministry for Antimonopoly Policy and Entrepreneurship Support	Gennady Khodyrev	28 October 1998	19 May 1999	CPRF
Ministry of Economics	Andrey Shapovalyants	25 September 1998	19 May 1999	Independent
Ministry of Justice	Pavel Krasheninnikov	25 September 1998	19 May 1999	Independent
Ministry of Commonwealth of Independent States Affairs	Boris Pastukhov	25 September 1998	19 May 1999	Independent
Ministry of Science and Technology	Mikhail Kirpichnikov	25 September 1998	19 May 1999	NDR
Ministry of Transport	Sergey Frank	11 September 1998	19 May 1999	Independent
Ministry of Fuel and Energy	Sergey Generalov	11 September 1998	19 May 1999	Independent
Ministry of Agriculture and Food	Viktor Semyonov	11 September 1998	19 May 1999	APR
Ministry of State Property	Farit Gazizullin	11 September 1998	19 May 1999	Independent
Ministry of Culture	Vladimir Yegorov	30 September 1998	19 May 1999	Independent
Ministry of Labour and Social Development	Sergey Kalashnikov	30 September 1998	19 May 1999	LDPR
Ministry of Natural Resources	Viktor Orlov	6 October 1998	19 May 1999	Independent
Ministry of Atomic Energy	Yevgeny Adamov	30 September 1998	19 May 1999	Independent
Ministry of Health	Vladimir Starodubov	30 September 1998	19 May 1999	Independent
Ministry of National Policy	Ramazan Abdulatipov	25 September 1998	19 May 1999	PRES
Ministry of Regional Policy	Valery Kirpichnikov	30 September 1998	19 May 1999	Independent
Ministry of Trade	Georgiy Gabunia	25 September 1998	19 May 1999	Independent
Ministry of Taxes and Duties	Georgy Boos	23 December 1998	19 May 1999	NDR
Head of the Apparatus of the Government of Russia	Yuri Zubakov	14 September 1998	19 May 1999	Independent
