= Vladimir Bulgak =

Russian politician (born 1941)

- Владимир Булгак
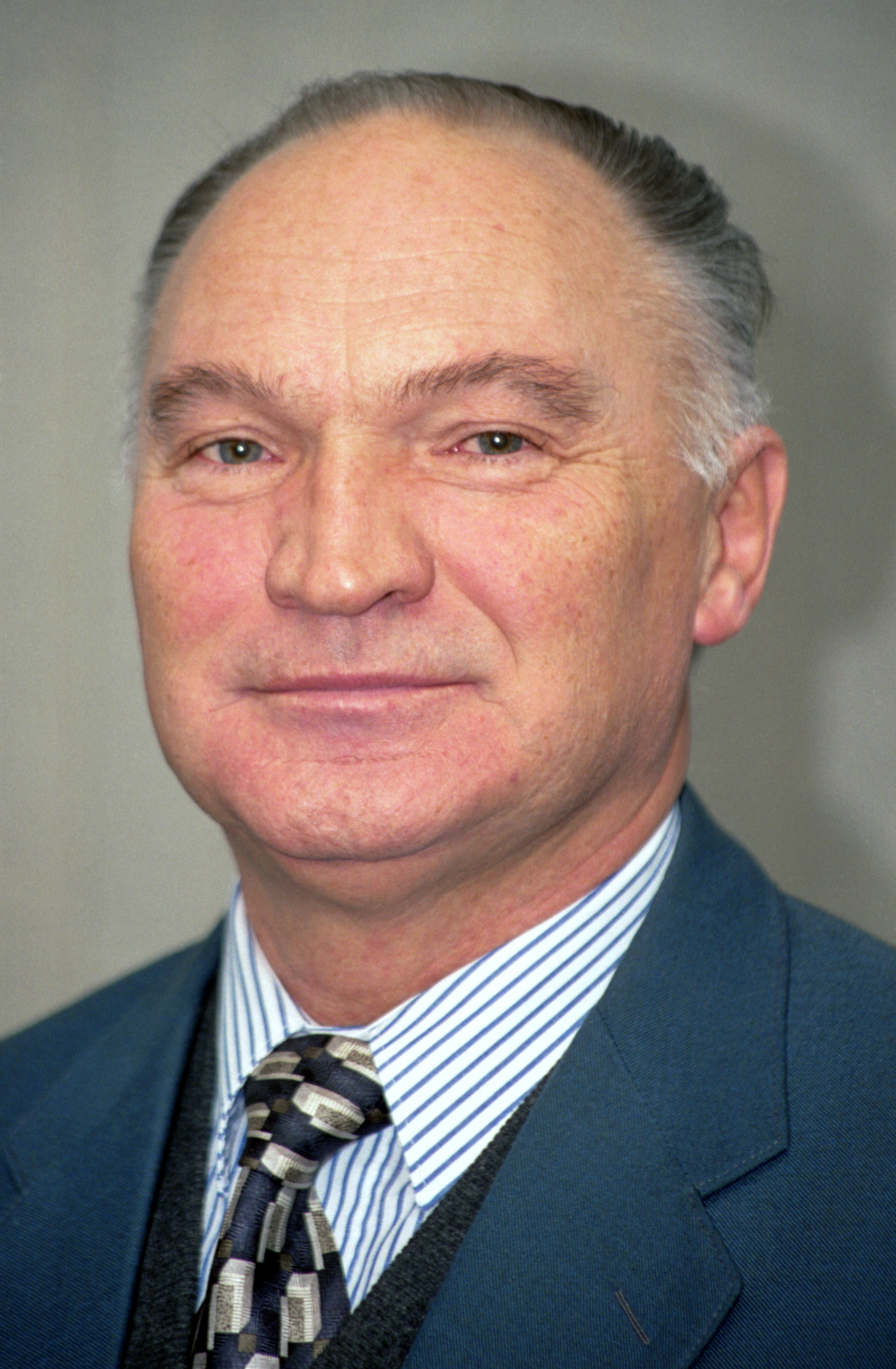
- Bulgak in 1999

Deputy Prime Minister
- In office September 1998 – 25 May 1999
- Prime Minister: Yevgeny Primakov

Minister of Science and Technology
- In office 30 April 1998 – September 1998
- Prime Minister: Sergey Kiriyenko

Deputy Prime Minister
- In office 17 March 1997 – 28 April 1998
- Prime Minister: Viktor Chernomyrdin

Minister of Communications and Mass Media
- In office 25 July 1990 – 17 March 1997

Personal details
- Born: Vladimir Borisovich Bulgak; 9 May 1941 (age 84) Moscow, Soviet Union
- Party: Communist Party of the Soviet Union; Our Home - Russia

Vladimir Bulgak (Russian: Владимир Булгак; born 9 May 1941) is a Russian engineer, bureaucrat and politician. He served in different capacities in various cabinets of Russia, including deputy prime minister.

== Early life and education ==
Bulgak was born in Moscow in 1941. He holds a degree in electric communications and later studied at the Institute of Economic Administration.

== Career ==
Bulgak began his career in the Komsomol. He joined the ministry of communications in 1983 and served as bureaucrat there until 1990.

Then he was appointed minister of telecommunications and mass media on 25 July 1990 and served in the post until 17 March 1997. He was the deputy prime minister in Viktor Chernomyrdin's government from 17 March 1997 to 28 April 1998. During his tenure Bulgak was in charge of science, research, production and industry policies. He was appointed minister of science and technology to the cabinet led by Prime Minister Sergey Kiriyenko on 30 April 1998. Bulgak was in office until September 1998.

He was reappointed deputy prime minister for industry and communications to the cabinet of Prime Minister Yevgeny Primakov and served in the post from 16 September 1998 to 25 May 1999. In July 1999, Bulgak was made chairman of the board of Svyazinvest JSC, largest telecommunications holding company in Russia.
