= Vladimir Kinelyov =

Russian politician (born 1945)

- Владимир Кинелёв

Ministry of General and Professional Education
- In office 14 August 1996 – 28 February 1998
- Preceded by: Himself as Chairman of the State Committee for Higher Education
- Succeeded by: Aleksandr Tikhonov

Chairman of the State Committee for Higher Education
- In office 21 April 1993 – 14 August 1996
- Preceded by: Position established
- Succeeded by: Himself as Minister of General and Professional Education

Personal details
- Born: 28 January 1945 (age 81) Reutov, Moscow Oblast, Russian SFSR, USSR
- Party: Independent
- Education: Bauman Moscow State Technical University
- Occupation: Academician, politician
- Awards: Order of Honour; Order of the Badge of Honour; Prize of the Council of Ministers of the USSR

Vladimir Georgiyevich Kinelyov (Russian: Влади́мир Гео́ргиевич Кинелёв; born 28 January 1945) is a Russian former politician and professor. He was the Minister of Education and the Deputy Prime Minister at the Viktor Chernomyrdin's First Cabinet for education and science during the 1990s, under President Boris Yeltsin.

== Biography ==
Born on January 28, 1945, in Ust-Kalmanka, Altai Krai. His father, Georgy Ivanovich, worked as a school principal, first secretary of the Ust-Kalmanka District Committee, secretary of the Krasnodar Regional Committee of the Communist Party of the Soviet Union, and deputy chairperson of the regional executive committee. His mother taught school.

He graduated from the Bauman Moscow Higher Technical School with a degree in aircraft strength (1968).

He defended his PhD dissertation in 1972.

He defended his doctoral dissertation in 1983, specializing in aircraft engines. He holds the title of Doctor of Technical Sciences and Professor.

From 1968 to 1973 he worked as Engineer, Senior Engineer at the Central Design Bureau of Experimental Mechanical Engineering (NPO Energia).

From 1973 to 1990 he served as Assistant, Senior Lecturer, Associate Professor, Professor, and Vice-Rector for Academic Affairs at Bauman Moscow State Technical University.

From 1990 to 1991 he served as First Deputy Chairman of the State Committee of the RSFSR for Science and Higher Education.

From January 1992 to April 1993 he served as chairman of the Committee for Higher Education of the Ministry of Science of the Russian Federation and as First Deputy Minister of Science of the Russian Federation.

From April 1993 to August 1996, he served as chairman of the State Committee of the Russian Federation for Higher Education.

From January to August 1996 he served as Deputy Prime Minister of the Russian Federation in Viktor Chernomyrdin's First Cabinet.

From August 1996 to February 1998 he served as Minister of General and Vocational Education of the Russian Federation in Viktor Chernomyrdin's Second Cabinet.

From April 1998 to December 2007 he served as Director of the UNESCO Institute for Information Technologies in Education.

Since January 1, 2008 he is Academic Director of the Russian New University for Information Technologies and Distance Education, Head of the UNESCO Chair at RosNOU.

He served as deputy prime minister in 1996 and was education minister of Russia from 1996 until 1998.
