= Sergey Kiriyenko's Cabinet =

Government of Russia in 1998

Cabinet of Sergei Kirienko
- 45th Cabinet of Russia

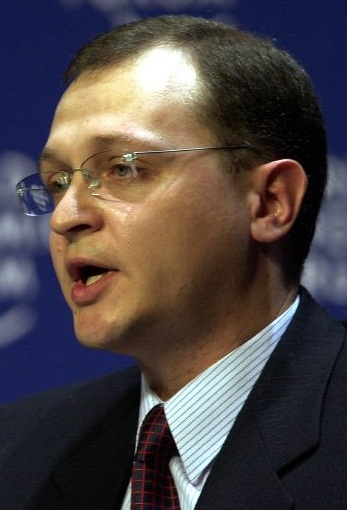
- Date formed: 24 April 1998
- Date dissolved: 23 August 1998

People and organisations
- Head of state: Boris Yeltsin
- Head of government: Sergei Kirienko; Viktor Chernomyrdin (acting)
- Deputy head of government: Boris Nemtsov
- No. of ministers: 27
- Member party: Our Home - Russia; Democratic Choice; Communist Party (special conditions)
- Status in legislature: Coalition
- Opposition party: Communist Party
- Opposition leader: Gennady Zuganov

History
- Predecessor: Chernomyrdin II
- Successor: Primakov

Sergei Kiriyenko's Cabinet (March 23, 1998 - August 23, 1998) was the sixth cabinet of government of the Russian Federation, preceded by Viktor Chernomyrdin's Second Cabinet and followed by Yevgeny Primakov's Cabinet. It was led by Prime Minister Sergey Kiriyenko, appointed acting Prime Minister on March 23 and proposed to the State Duma for approvement on March 27, 1998. On April 10 and April 17 Duma disapproved him as Prime Minister twice (April 10: 143 in favor, 186 against, 5 abstained, April 17: 115 in favor, 271 against, 11 abstained), but on the third time on April 24 he was approved by the State Duma (251 in favor, 25 against) and appointed Prime Minister by the President. According to the Constitution of Russia, if the State Duma rejects the President's nomination three times, it must be dissolved and a parliamentary election held.

According to the Russian legislation, the ministers were appointed by the President.

On August 23, 1998, Yeltsin sacked the government after the 1998 Russian financial crisis had taken a dramatic turn on August 17, replaced Kiriyenko with Viktor Chernomyrdin as acting Prime Minister, although he had been neither a deputy nor even a member of the cabinet of Kiriyenko as required by law, and reappointed all the other ministers as acting ministers.

Fourteen ministers survived the reshuffle (see Yevgeny Primakov's Cabinet).

== Ministers ==
Portfolio	Minister	Took office	Left office	Party
Chairman of the Government	Sergey Kiriyenko	24 April 1998	23 August 1998	Independent
Chairman of the Government	Viktor Chernomyrdin (acting)	23 August 1998	11 September 1998	NDR
Deputy Chairman of the Government	Boris Nemtsov	28 April 1998	28 August 1998	Independent
Deputy Chairman of the Government	Viktor Khristenko	28 April 1998	11 September 1998	Independent
Deputy Chairman of the Government	Oleg Sysuev	30 April 1998	11 September 1998	NDR
State Taxes Service, Deputy Chairman of the Government	Boris Fyodorov	29 May 1998; DChG since 17 August	28 August 1998	FR
Ministry of Foreign Affairs	Yevgeny Primakov	24 April 1998	11 September 1998	Independent
Ministry of Defence	Igor Sergeyev	24 April 1998	11 September 1998	Independent
Ministry of Internal Affairs	Sergei Stepashin	24 April 1998	11 September 1998	Independent
Ministry of Finance	Mikhail Zadornov	24 April 1998	11 September 1998	Independent
Ministry of Railways	Nikolay Aksyonenko	24 April 1998	11 September 1998	Independent
Ministry of General and Professional Education	Alexander Tikhonov	24 April 1998	11 September 1998	Independent
Ministry of Emergency Situations	Sergei Shoigu	24 April 1998	11 September 1998	NDR
Ministry of Land Policy, Construction and Housing and Communal Services	Ilya Yuzhanov	5 May 1998	11 September 1998	Independent
Ministry of Economics	Yakov Urinson	24 April 1998	11 September 1998	Independent
Ministry of Science and Technology	Vladimir Bulgak	30 April 1998	11 September 1998	NDR
Ministry of Justice	Pavel Krasheninnikov	30 April 1998	11 September 1998	Independent
Ministry of Transport	Sergey Frank	24 April 1998	11 September 1998	Independent
Ministry of Energy	Sergey Generalov	30 April 1998	11 September 1998	Independent
Ministry of Agriculture and Food	Viktor Semyonov	30 April 1998	11 September 1998	APR
Ministry of State Property	Farit Gazizullin	24 April 1998	11 September 1998	Independent
Ministry of Culture	Natalia Dementieva	24 April 1998	11 September 1998	Independent
Ministry of Labour and Social Development	Oksana Dmitriyeva	30 April 1998	11 September 1998	Independent
Ministry of Natural Resources	Viktor Nekrutenko	30 April 1998	11 September 1998	Independent
Ministry of Atomic Energy	Yevgeny Adamov	8 May 1998	11 September 1998	Independent
Ministry of Health	Oleg Rutkovskiy	8 May 1998	11 September 1998	Independent
Ministry of Regional and National Policy	Evgeny Sapiro	8 May 1998	11 September 1998	Independent
Ministry of Industry and Trade	Georgiy Gabunia (acting)	8 May 1998	23 July 1998	Independent
Ministry of Industry and Trade	Yuri Maslyukov	23 July 1998	11 September 1998	CPRF
Head of the Apparatus of the Government of Russia (as Minister until 28 August 1998)	Nikolay Khvatkov	8 May 1998	28 August 1998	Independent
Head of the Apparatus of the Government of Russia (as Minister until 28 August 1998)	Igor Shabdurasulov	28 August 1998	11 September 1998	Independent

== See also ==
- 1998 Russian financial crisis
