= Prime Minister of Russia =

Head of government

Prime Minister of the Russian Federation
- Председатель Правительства Российской Федерации (Russian)
- Logo of the Government of Russia

- Flag of Russia

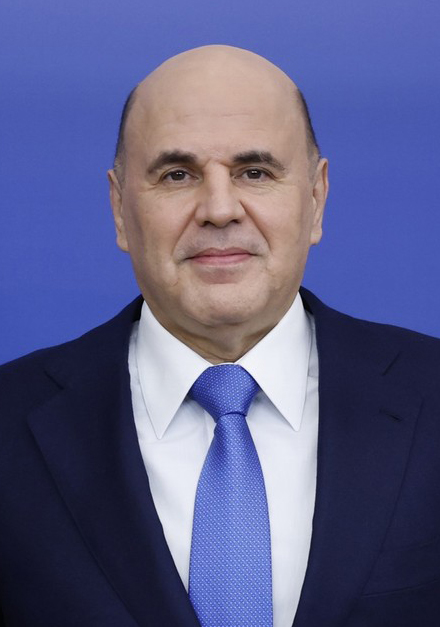
- Incumbent; Mikhail Mishustin since 16 January 2020
- Executive branch of the Russian Government; Council of Ministers of Russia
- Style: His Excellency (diplomatic); Mr. Chairman (informal)
- Type: Head of government
- Abbreviation: PMOR, PMORF
- Member of: Government; Security Council; State Council
- Reports to: President; State Duma
- Seat: White House, Moscow
- Nominator: President
- Appointer: President; (with the approval of the State Duma)
- Term length: No fixed term
- Constituting instrument: Constitution of Russia
- Precursor: Chairman of the Council of Ministers of the Soviet Union (1923–1991)
- Formation: 6 November 1905; 120 years ago (original); 12 December 1993; 32 years ago (current form)
- First holder: Sergei Witte
- Unofficial names: Prime Minister
- Deputy: First Deputy Prime Minister; Deputy Prime Minister
- Salary: US$105,000 annually
- Website: premier.gov.ru (geo blocked)

The prime minister of the Russian Federation, also domestically stylized as the chair of the government of the Russian Federation (Note: Russian: Председатель Правительства Российской Федерации, romanized: Predsedatel Pravitelstva Rossiyskoy Federatsii) and widely recognized as the prime minister, (Note: Russian: Премьер-министр, romanized: Premyer-ministr) is the head of government of Russia and the second highest ranking political office in Russia. Although the post dates back to 1905, its current form was established on 12 December 1993 following the introduction of a new constitution.

Due to the central role of the president of Russia in the political system, the activities of the executive branch (including the prime minister) are significantly influenced by the head of state (for example, it is the president who appoints and dismisses the prime minister and other members of the government; the president may chair the meetings of the cabinet and give obligatory orders to the prime minister and other members of the government; the president may also revoke any act of the government). The use of the term prime minister is strictly informal and is never used in the Russian constitution; however, it exists as the official English translation for the office.

Mikhail Mishustin is the current prime minister. He was appointed on 16 January 2020 after Dmitry Medvedev and the rest of the government resigned the previous day.

== Imperial period ==
=== Early Russian prime ministers ===
Until 1905, the head of government was the emperor. In the absence of the emperor, the ministers one by one, starting with the oldest in the rank, each acted as head of government for four sessions.

In 1810, the chairpersonship was granted to the state chancellor, Count Nikolay Rumyantsev, the former then chairperson of the State Council. Since 1812, as chair of the committee has evolved into an independent position, which until 1865 necessarily coincide with the presidency of the Council of State.

Traditionally, the chairpersonship of the committee was last in the public service honorary position appointed by the dignitaries that have become too old to execution of the duties of the minister. A number of committee chairpersons (especially duke Alexander Chernyshyov, count Alexey F. Orlov, count Dmitry Bludov) was characterized by contemporaries as "barely alive", "miserable". Count Modest Korf jokingly wrote about count Chernyshov: "Look, just live!" Duke Pavel Gagarin died in office at the age of 83 years.

=== 1905–1917 ===
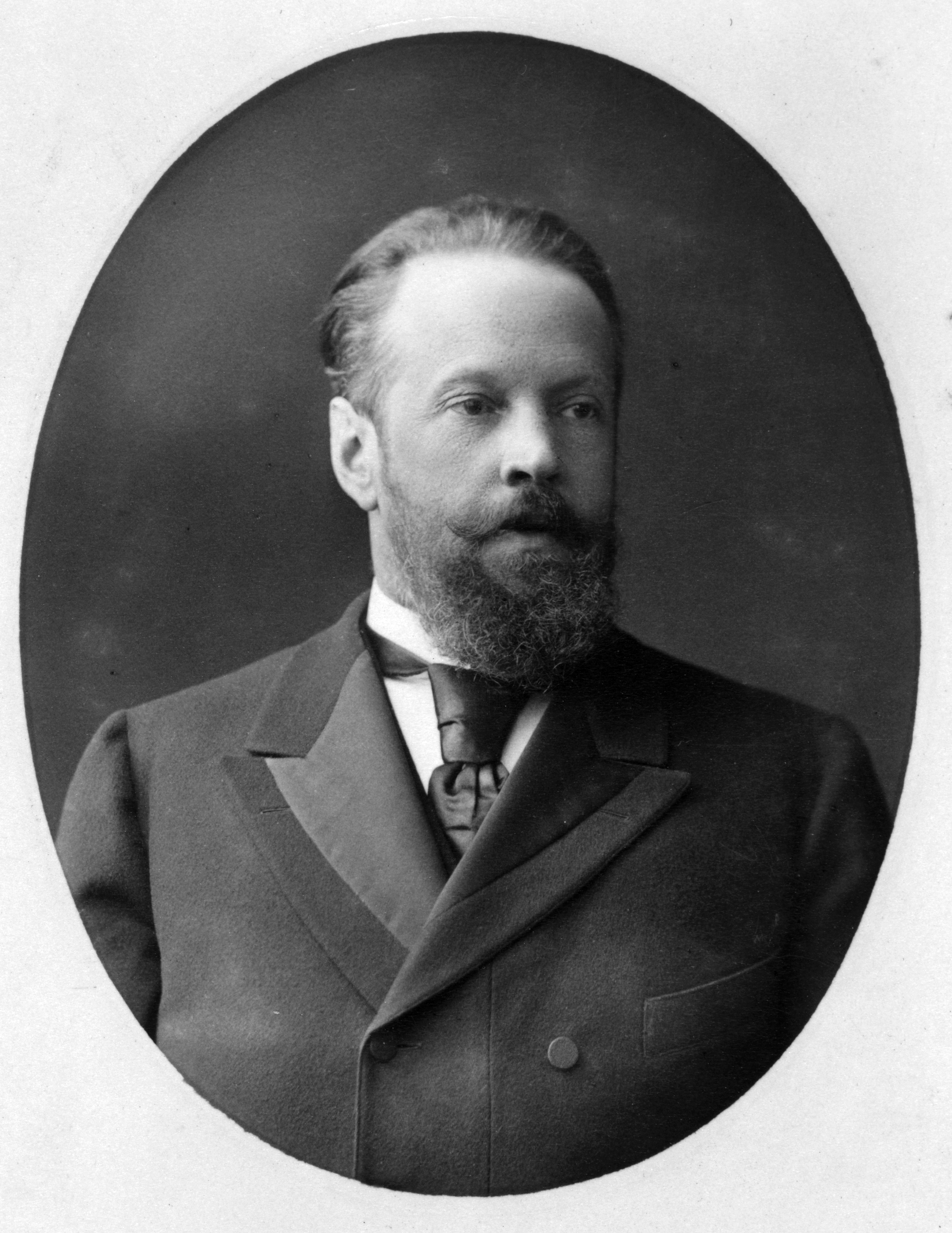
Count Sergei Witte, the first prime minister of Russia

The modern post of prime minister appeared in 1905. A decree of Emperor Nicholas II on 19 October 1905 established the Council of Ministers of the Russian Empire, bringing together the Ministers in one Cabinet (previously each Minister had reported directly to the Emperor on the affairs of their department). The Chairperson of the Council of Ministers officially became a fully-fledged head of government. Nicholas appointed Graf Sergei Witte as his first "prime minister".

From 1905 the prime minister received extensive powers, with the opportunity to pursue their own policies and reforms. Pyotr Stolypin (in office: 1906–1911) gained a reputation as one of the strongest prime ministers—during his premiership he made several major (though controversial) reforms.

Though the Russian Constitution of 1906 established the State Duma (a representative house of parliament), the Government was not responsible to it. Although Sergei Witte and Pyotr Stolypin (at the beginning of his Premiership) each tried to form a coalition government of the largest political organizations, they did not succeed. The State Duma nevertheless tried to gain influence over the government. Conflict between the State Duma and the government became particularly evident during the first Premiership of Ivan Goremykin in 1906.

The position of Chair of the Council of Ministers of the Russian Empire lasted 12 years; during this time seven people took this post (one twice). The position lapsed after the February Revolution of March 1917, following the abdication of Nicholas II from the throne on 15 March [O.S. 2 March] 1917 and the formation that same day of the Provisional Government.

== Provisional Government ==
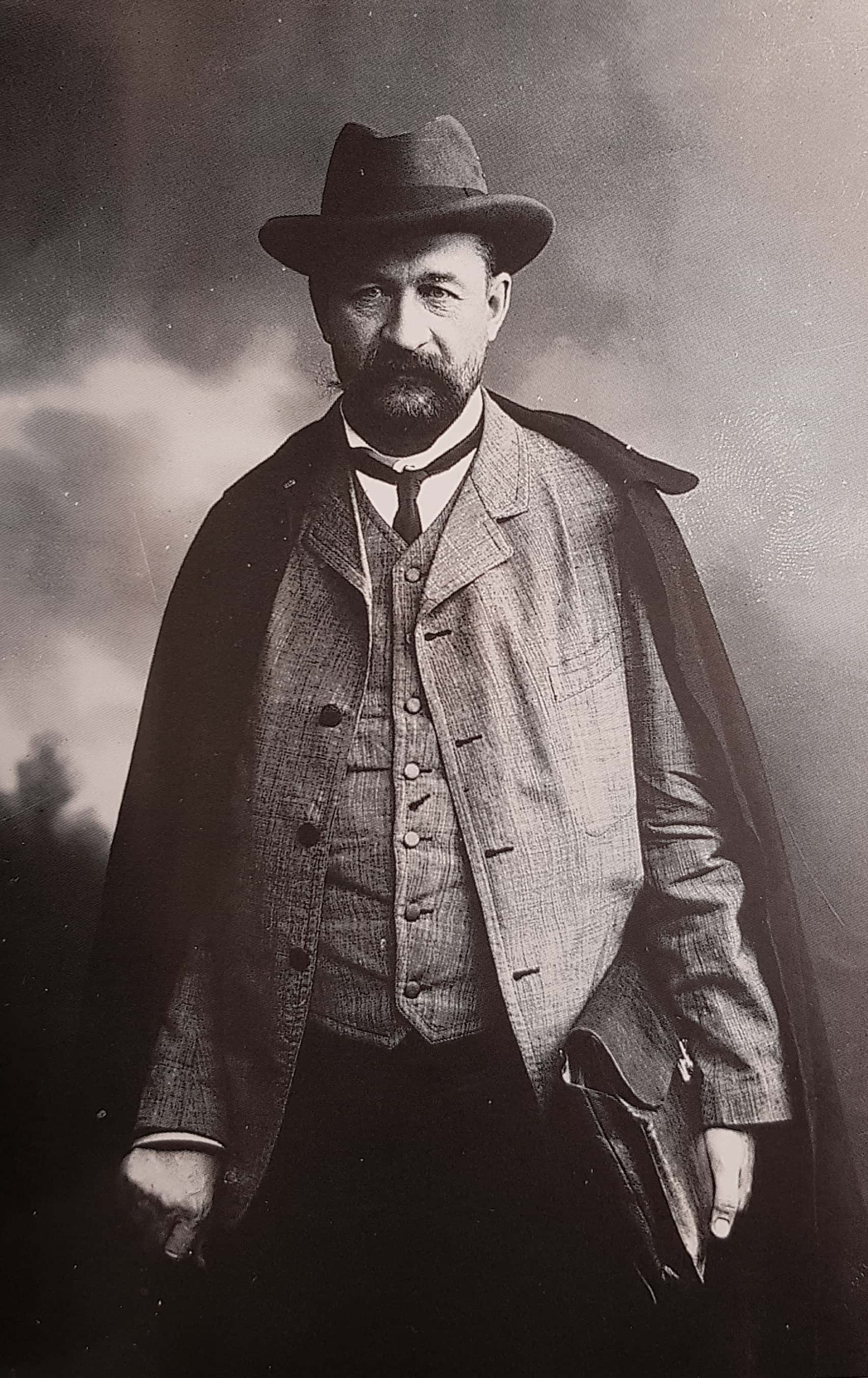
Georgy Lvov, the 8th prime minister of Russia (1st Minister-chairperson of the Russian Provisional Government)

During the Russian Provisional Government, the prime minister de facto headed the Russian state and was officially called the “Minister-Chairperson of the Russian Provisional Government". This position was held by only two people, Georgy Lvov and Alexander Kerensky.

The position lasted about six months, and after the October Revolution, was replaced by Chairperson of the Council of People's Commissars of the Russian SFSR.

== Soviet period ==
During the reign of Vladimir Lenin, the Chairperson of the Council of People's Commissars was the de facto leader of the RSFSR (from 1922 to 1991).

In 1946, the post of head of government was renamed Chairperson of the Council of Ministers. People who held those positions are sometimes referred to as the prime ministers. They may have also been referred to as premier of ministers, or simply premier.

== Post-Soviet period ==
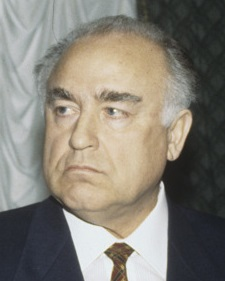
Viktor Chernomyrdin, the 29th prime minister of Russia (1st chairperson of the Government of the Russian Federation)

Currently, the formal title of the prime minister is "Chairperson of the Government of the Russian Federation".

In modern Russia, the prime minister is appointed by the president, with the consent of the State Duma. The prime minister is responsible to the president and regularly reports to them, however, they only report to the State Duma once a year.

After the election of Boris Yeltsin, President of Russia, the head of the government was Yeltsin himself. He headed the Russian SFSR Government (16 May 1992, the Government of the Russian Federation) for about six months. In fact, Yeltsin was the first Head of Government of Russia after the dissolution of the Soviet Union; however, he was not the prime minister. After Yeltsin, Yegor Gaidar became acting prime minister, but the Russian Supreme Soviet refused to approve him as prime minister. On 14 December 1992, the prime minister appointed was Viktor Chernomyrdin.

The Russian political system is similar to the modern French system. In order to appoint the prime minister the president needs a majority in the state Duma. If the president's party does not have the majority and fails to form a coalition, the president may need to appoint a loyalist to the position of prime minister. For example, this occurred in 1998 when the State Duma (which had most of the opposition to the president's party) twice refused to appoint Prime Minister Viktor Chernomyrdin, and Boris Yeltsin appointed Prime Minister Yevgeny Primakov, who supported the left opposition.

In the mid-1990s in Russia there was a term "technical prime minister". This term refers to the prime minister, who is not an independent political figure, is only the nominal head of government, and in fact the activities of the government are headed by the president.

== Duties and competences ==
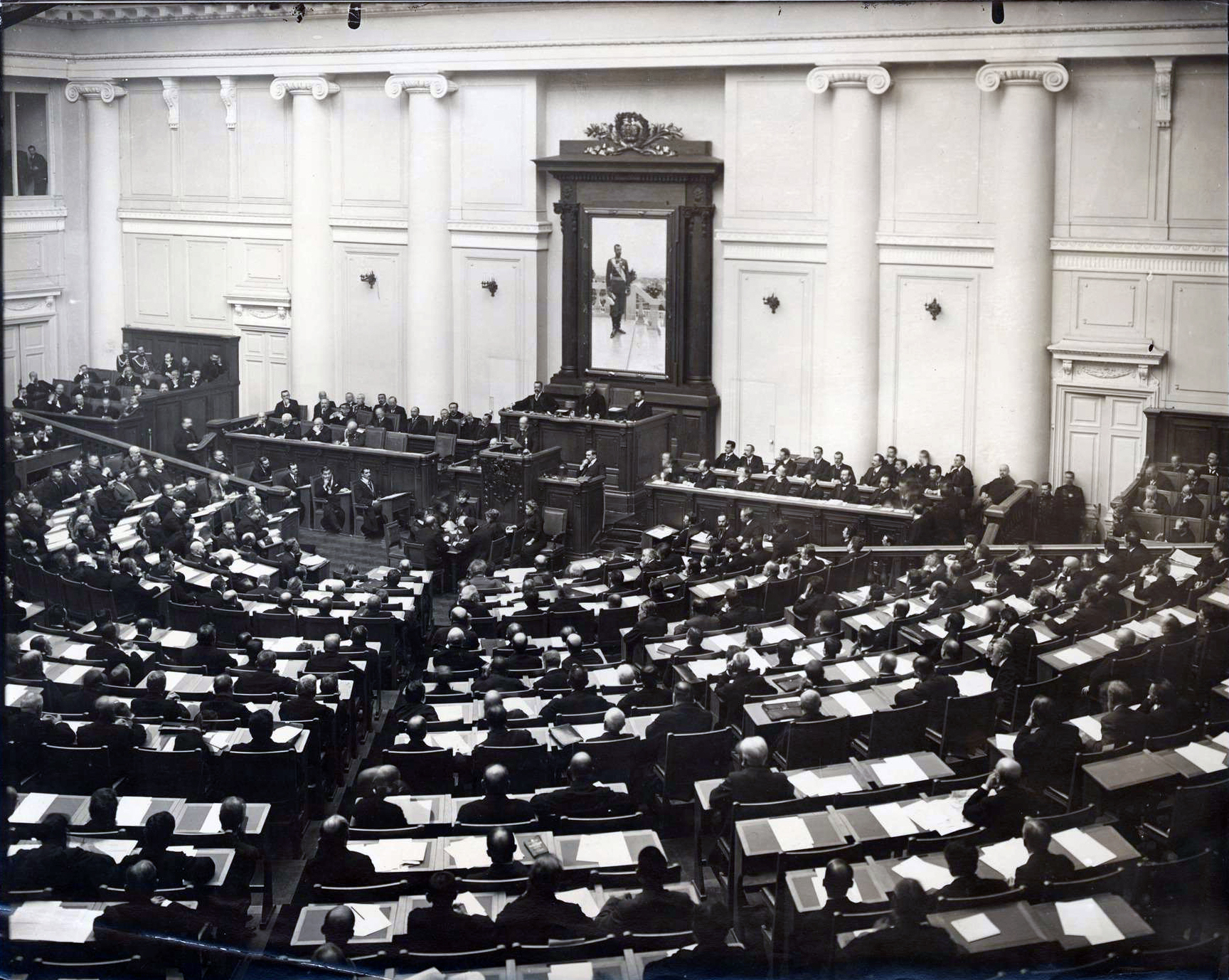
Prime Minister Vladimir Kokovtsov reading a government report in the State Duma. 5 December 1912

In general, the prime minister serves more of an administrative role, nominating members of the Cabinet and taking the lead in fully implementing domestic and foreign policy as formulated by the president. In accordance with the federal constitutional law "On the Government of the Russian Federation" the prime minister exercises the following duties:

- determines the operating priorities of the government and organizes its work in accordance with the Constitution, federal constitutional laws, federal laws and presidential decrees, aside from running the day-to-day affairs of the government, in general.
- submits to the president proposals on the structure and functions of the central institutions of the executive branch (e.g. ministries and federal agencies);
- nominates the vice prime ministers, federal ministers and other officers and presents them to the president;
- submits to the president proposals on punishment and rewards of the government members;
- represents the government as an institution in foreign relations and inside the country;
- heads the sessions of the government and its Presidium where they have the decisive vote;
- signs the acts of the government;
- report annually to the State Duma about the government activities;
- distributes duties among members of the government;
- systematically informs the president about the government activities;

The prime minister is ex officio a member of:

- The Security Council of the Russian Federation;
- The Council of the Heads of Government of the Commonwealth of Independent States;
- The Supreme State Council of the Union State of Russia and Belarus;
- The Council of the Heads of Government of the Shanghai Cooperation Organization;
- The Eurasian Intergovernmental Council of the Eurasian Economic Union (EAEU);

== Appointment ==
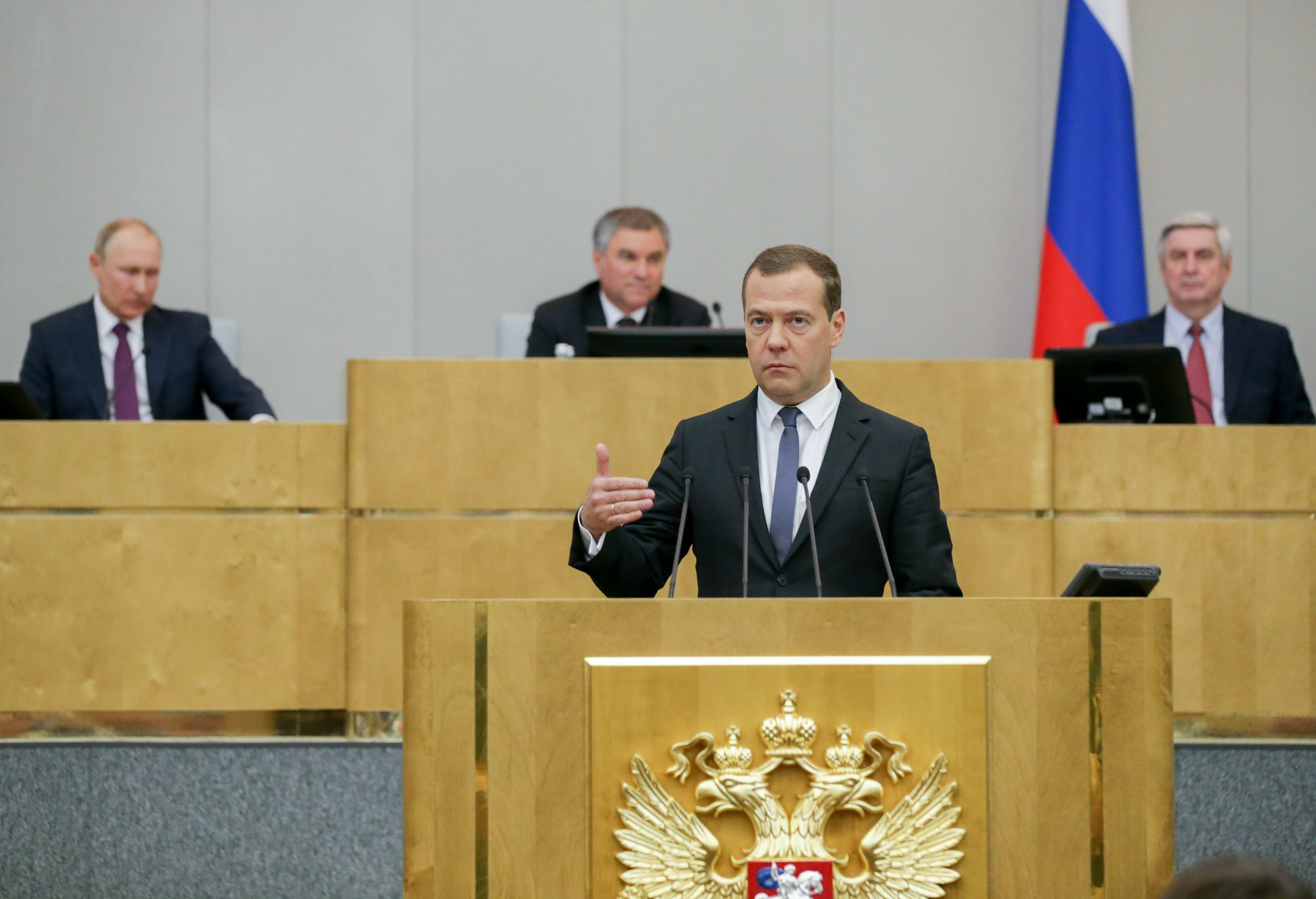
Dmitry Medvedev at his confirmation hearing on 8 May 2018

Initially, the prime minister was appointed by the Emperor of Russia, without the consent of the candidate to the State Duma.

In Soviet times, the prime minister of the Russian SFSR was appointed by the Supreme Council after each election.

Currently the prime minister is appointed by the president of Russia, subject to the consent of the State Duma (before 1993 the Supreme Soviet). Unlike most other "prime ministers", who are also elected members of the legislative body or parliament, the Chairperson of the Government of Russia can be any Russian citizen, as long as they do not also hold citizenship of another country.

Under law, the president shall nominate a new Chairperson of the Government within two weeks of the resignation of a previous government or inauguration ceremony of president. The State Duma is to discuss the matter within two weeks of the nomination and make a decision. The procedure of granting consent by the parliament is usually preceded by several days of comprehensive consultations and interviews of the candidate by the parliamentary factions. Should the State Duma decide to give the president its approval, the president may immediately sign the respective appointment decree. Should the State Duma refuse to give its approval, the president will have to nominate another (or the same) candidate within one week of the rejection of the previous candidate. However, in the event that the Duma rejects the president's appointment to prime minister three times, they may dissolve the Duma, call for new elections and appoint a candidate for prime minister without its consent.

Should the State Duma reject candidates nominated by the president for three times consecutively, the president can (but is not required to after the passage of the 2020 amendments to the Constitution) dissolve it and call a new election, while the prime minister shall be appointed by the president without participation of the Duma. The State Duma may not be dissolved on these grounds during the first year after parliamentary elections, the last six months of the incumbent president's term, as well as in time of emergency, or war and in the event that the State Duma has initiated the impeachment of the incumbent president.

=== Results of confirmations voting ===
Candidate	Date	Total deputies	Yes		No	Abstaining	No vote	Result
Supreme Soviet confirmations
Yegor Gaidar	9 December 1992	1040	467	44.9%	486	26	61	Not approved
Viktor Chernomyrdin	14 December 1992	1040	721	69.3%	172	48	1	Approved
State Duma confirmations
Viktor Chernomyrdin	10 August 1996	443	314	70.9%	85	3	48	Approved
Sergey Kirienko	10 April 1998	443	143	32.3%	186	5	116	Not approved
Sergey Kirienko	17 April 1998	443	115	25.9%	271	11	153	Not approved
Sergey Kirienko	24 April 1998	443	251	56.7%	25	39	135	Approved
Viktor Chernomyrdin	31 August 1998	443	94	21.2%	253	0	98	Not approved
Viktor Chernomyrdin	7 September 1998	443	138	31.2%	273	1	32	Not approved
Yevgeny Primakov	11 September 1998	443	317	71.6%	63	15	49	Approved
Sergei Stepashin	19 May 1999	443	301	67.9%	55	14	70	Approved
Vladimir Putin	16 August 1999	443	233	52.6%	84	17	105	Approved
Mikhail Kasyanov	17 May 2000	441	325	72.7%	55	15	52	Approved
Mikhail Fradkov	5 March 2004	445	352	79.1%	58	24	13	Approved
Mikhail Fradkov	12 May 2004	445	356	80%	72	8	11	Approved
Viktor Zubkov	14 September 2007	445	381	85.6%	47	8	9	Approved
Vladimir Putin	8 May 2008	450	392	87.1%	56	0	0	Approved
Dmitry Medvedev	8 May 2012	450	299	66.4%	144	0	0	Approved
Dmitry Medvedev	8 May 2018	446	374	83.9%	56	0	14	Approved
Mikhail Mishustin	16 January 2020	449	383	85.1%	0	41	25	Approved
Mikhail Mishustin	10 May 2024	449	375	83.3%	0	57	18	Approved

== Removal from office ==
The prime minister may be dismissed by the president at any time at the president's discretion. The prime minister may also tender their resignation to the president on their own initiative. The president may reject such resignation and oblige them to continue their work. The prime minister and the whole government are constitutionally obliged to resign after the inauguration of a newly elected president. At the same time, the president has the right to dismiss both the entire government together with the prime minister, and only prime minister, retaining the government.

Under certain circumstances, the president may also theoretically be forced to dismiss the chairperson and the whole government under the pressure of the State Duma. For that to happen, the State Duma has to pass a censure motion against the government twice within three months. Normally, in this case the president has the right to choose whether to sack the government or to dissolve the Duma (and if the Duma passes the censure motion just once, the president may also choose "not to agree" with the decision of the Duma, which technically means that neither the cabinet nor the Duma are dismissed).

However, within one year after parliamentary elections the dissolution of the State Duma is impossible on these grounds. That is why in this case the president does not have any other option but to dismiss the government (even if they totally support it).

== Term of office ==
Initially, the term of office of the prime minister was not formally established. The head of the government served in their post for as long as the Emperor thought necessary.

In Soviet times, the term of the prime minister was also unlimited. The Chairperson of the Council of Ministers of the Russian SFSR served in the position until they were dismissed by the General Secretary of the Communist Party of the Soviet Union.

A term limit was introduced after the creation of the post of the president of Russia. Government became subordinate to the president, so the prime minister must resign along with the president, but may be appointed again. From 1991 to 1996, the maximum term of office of the prime minister was 5 years. After the new Constitution of Russia was created, the term of office of the president, and therefore the term of office of the prime minister, was shortened to 4 years. In 2012, after amendments to the Constitution the term of the president and prime minister was increased to 6 years.

== Acting prime minister ==
=== Temporary absence ===
The Federal constitutional law "On the Government of the Russian Federation" says "in the case of temporary absence of the Chairperson of the Government of the Russian Federation, their duties are performed by one of the deputy chairpersons of the Government of the Russian Federation in accordance with a written distribution of responsibilities". It is automatic and the President's Executive Order is not required in that moment. The Federal constitutional law "On the Government of the Russian Federation" does not limit the term of "temporary absence" of the prime minister and the term of work of the acting prime minister.

There can be more than one First Deputy Prime Minister of Russia, therefore written distribution of responsibilities is the most important document. The office of First Vice-Premier is not provisioned by Constitution and it is not separate office. The Chapter 6 of the Constitution of Russia says, that "The Government of the Russian Federation consists of the Chairperson of the Government of the Russian Federation, Deputy Chairperson of the Government of the Russian Federation and federal ministries".

=== When the whole of government resigned ===
The prime minister can leave their post at their own request or if it is impossible for them to exercise their powers. The Federal constitutional law "On the Government of the Russian Federation" says that the dismissal of the prime minister entails the resignation of the entire government. If the prime minister resigns, the president has the right to delegate their duties to one of their Vice-premiers. This situation cannot continue for more than two months – this period is reserved for the head of state to select a candidate for a new prime minister and submit it to The state Duma.

Very often, the acting prime minister later proposed the State Duma as the new prime minister.

== Succession of the presidency ==
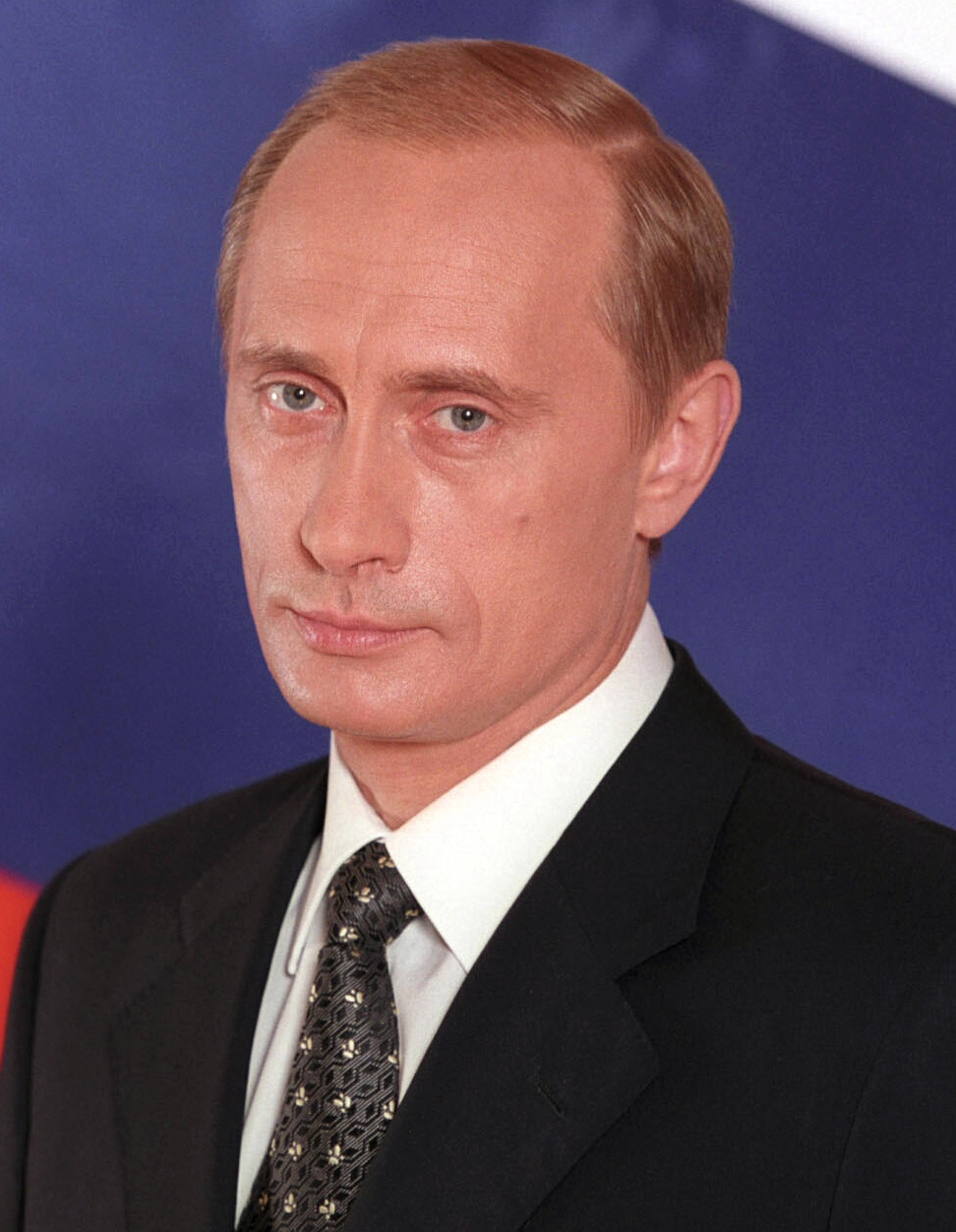
Prime Minister Vladimir Putin became acting president after the resignation of Boris Yeltsin.

In case of the president's death, resignation or impeachment, the prime minister becomes a temporary president until new presidential elections which must take place within three months. The prime minister as acting president may not dissolve the State Duma, announce a referendum or propose amendments to the Constitution.

The Russian Constitution does not explicitly specify who should become acting president if the prime minister is not appointed or is unable to perform their duties. Some believe that in the case of incapacity of the president and prime minister, the chairperson of the Federation Council should become acting head of state. However, nowhere in the legislation is this fixed.

== List of prime ministers of Russia ==
Approximately 99 people have been head of the Russian government since its establishment in 1726. The chairperson of government was a member of the Supreme Privy Council, which was created on 8 (19) February 1726 by Empress Catherine, and from 8 (20) September 1802 ministerial duties were allocated by the Committee of Ministers, which was established on in accordance with the proclamation of Emperor Alexander II. Beginning with Count Aleksandr Romanovich Vorontsov, the eldest of the officers was de facto chairperson of the committee. Eight years after the inauguration of the manifest, the first de jure office holder was Count Nikolay Rumyantsev. The Council of Ministers was unofficially formed in October 1857, as a result of Emperor Alexander II's reforms; its first session began on 19 (31) December 1857. Before the actual formation of that body on 12 (24) November 1861, the Emperor himself was in charge. The Council of Ministers consisted of chairperson of the State Council and the Committee of Ministers, as well as high-ranking officers appointed by the Emperor. The first session ended on 11 (23) December 1882, after the number of files to the Council greatly decreased.

The Committee of Ministers functioned simultaneously with the second session of the Council of Ministers for six more months; Count Sergei Witte participated on both entities until the abolition of the committee on 23 April (5 May) 1906. Following that event, the duties of the committee were left to the Council of Ministers, until the formation of the Small Council in 1909, which also included deputy ministers. By the order of Emperor Nicholas II, the second session of the Council of Ministers began on 19 October (1 November) 1905, following the formation of the State Duma. Shortly after the February Revolution and the inception of the Russian Provisional Government on 2 (15) March 1917, Georgy Lvov from the Constitutional Democratic Party and Alexander Kerensky from the Socialist Revolutionary Party became joint Minister-Chairmen. The provisional Russian Republic was eventually replaced by the Russian Soviet Federative Socialist Republic (RSFSR) and the governmental body by the Council of People's Commissars, which was chaired from 1917 to 1924 by Vladimir Lenin. That body was renamed Council of Ministers following a decree of the Supreme Council on 23 March 1946.

After the fall of the Soviet Union, Boris Yeltsin, as the President of the Russian Federation, was automatically appointed as the Head of Government of the Russian Federation in the first two years of his mandate. The latter body took the previous name "Council of Ministers", the chairperson of which became Viktor Chernomyrdin, replacing acting chairperson Yegor Gaidar. According to the new constitution ratified on 25 December 1993, those two entities were separated. Since then, the head of that office takes the formal title "chairperson of the Government" or colloquially "Prime Minister" (the only actual prime minister was Valentin Pavlov). Chernomyrdin resumed chairing the government, followed up by non-partisans and acting office holders. On 8 May 2008, Vladimir Putin took the office for a second term, now as a member of United Russia. Current Prime Minister Mikhail Mishustin took the office on 16 January 2020.

The youngest head of government by his accession to office was Count Charles Frederick, Duke of Holstein-Gottorp, at age 26, and the oldest Count Pyotr Andreyevich Tolstoy, at age 81.

The list below includes Prime Ministers since 1991.

List of Heads of Government of Russia since 1991
No.	Name (Lifespan)	Portrait	Political party	Term of office		State Duma	Government Party affiliation of ministers
1	Boris Yeltsin (1931–2007)		Independent	26 December 1991	15 June 1992	12th Supreme; Soviet	Yeltsin–Gaidar; Independents (Note: A large number of ministers are former members of the CPSU, like Yeltsin)
—	Yegor Gaidar (1956–2009)		Independent (Note: Later became the founder and leader of Democratic Choice of Russia)	15 June 1992	14 December 1992	12th Supreme; Soviet	Yeltsin–Gaidar; Independents
2	Viktor Chernomyrdin (1938–2010)		Independent	14 December 1992	9 August 1996 (Note: On 2 October 1993, by decree of Vice President Alexander Rutskoy, who was considered by the Russian Parliament as the acting President of Russia, Chernomyrdin was dismissed from the post of prime minister. However, the decree was not implemented due to the events of 3-4 October 1993)	12th Supreme; Soviet	Chernomyrdin I NDR • DVR • APR • PRES • DPR • KEDR
2	Viktor Chernomyrdin (1938–2010)		Independent	14 December 1992	9 August 1996	1993 (1st)	Chernomyrdin I NDR • DVR • APR • PRES • DPR • KEDR
	Viktor Chernomyrdin (1938–2010)		Our Home – Russia (Note: since 1995)	14 December 1992	9 August 1996	1995 (2nd)	Chernomyrdin I NDR • DVR • APR • PRES • DPR • KEDR
	Viktor Chernomyrdin (1938–2010)		Our Home – Russia	10 August 1996	23 March 1998	1995 (2nd)	Chernomyrdin II; NDR • DVR • PRES
—	Sergey Kiriyenko (born 1962)		Independent (Note: Later became the leader of the Union of Right Forces)	23 March 1998	24 April 1998	1995 (2nd)	Chernomyrdin II; NDR • DVR • PRES
3	Sergey Kiriyenko (born 1962)		Independent	24 April 1998	23 August 1998	1995 (2nd)	Kiriyenko; NDR • DVR • VR!
—	Viktor Chernomyrdin (1938–2010)		Our Home – Russia	23 August 1998	11 September 1998	1995 (2nd)	Kiriyenko; NDR • DVR • VR!
4	Yevgeny Primakov (1929–2015)		Independent (Note: Later became the leader of the Fatherland – All Russia)	11 September 1998	12 May 1999	1995 (2nd)	Primakov; OVR • NDR • CPRF • PRES • VR!
—	Sergei Stepashin (born 1952)		Independent (Note: Later became the member of the Yabloko, but left shortly after the 1999 legislative election)	12 May 1999	19 May 1999	1995 (2nd)	Primakov; OVR • NDR • CPRF • PRES • VR!
5	Sergei Stepashin (born 1952)		Independent	19 May 1999	9 August 1999	1995 (2nd)	Stepashin; NDR • DVR • LDPR • PRES
—	Vladimir Putin (born 1952)		Independent	9 August 1999	19 August 1999	1995 (2nd)	Stepashin; NDR • DVR • LDPR • PRES
6	Vladimir Putin (born 1952)		Independent	19 August 1999	7 May 2000	1995 (2nd)	Putin I Unity • NDR • SPS • APR
	Vladimir Putin (born 1952)		Unity	19 August 1999	7 May 2000	1999 (3rd)	Putin I Unity • NDR • SPS • APR
—	Mikhail Kasyanov (born 1957)		Independent (Note: Later became the leader of the Russian People's Democratic Union)	7 May 2000	17 May 2000	1999 (3rd)	Putin I Unity • NDR • SPS • APR
7	Mikhail Kasyanov (born 1957)		Independent	17 May 2000	24 February 2004	1999 (3rd)	Kasyanov; Unity/United Russia • NDR • OVR • APR
7	Mikhail Kasyanov (born 1957)		Independent	17 May 2000	24 February 2004	2003 (4th)	Kasyanov; Unity/United Russia • NDR • OVR • APR
—	Viktor Khristenko (born 1957)		Independent	24 February 2004	5 March 2004	2003 (4th)	Kasyanov; Unity/United Russia • NDR • OVR • APR
8	Mikhail Fradkov (born 1950)		Independent	5 March 2004	7 May 2004	2003 (4th)	Fradkov I United Russia
—	Mikhail Fradkov (born 1950)		Independent	7 May 2004	12 May 2004	2003 (4th)	Fradkov I United Russia
(8)	Mikhail Fradkov (born 1950)		Independent	12 May 2004	12 September 2007	2003 (4th)	Fradkov II; United Russia
—	Mikhail Fradkov (born 1950)		Independent	12 September 2007	14 September 2007	2003 (4th)	Fradkov II; United Russia
9	Viktor Zubkov (born 1941)		Independent (Note: officially affiliated with United Russia)	14 September 2007	7 May 2008	2003 (4th)	Zubkov; United Russia
—	Viktor Zubkov (born 1941)		Independent	7 May 2008	8 May 2008	2007 (5th)	Zubkov; United Russia
(6)	Vladimir Putin (born 1952)		United Russia	8 May 2008	7 May 2012	2007 (5th)	Putin II; United Russia
—	Viktor Zubkov (born 1941)		Independent	7 May 2012	8 May 2012	2011 (6th)	Putin II; United Russia
10	Dmitry Medvedev (born 1965)		United Russia	8 May 2012	7 May 2018	2011 (6th)	Medvedev I United Russia
10	Dmitry Medvedev (born 1965)		United Russia	8 May 2012	7 May 2018	2016 (7th)	Medvedev I United Russia
—	Dmitry Medvedev (born 1965)		United Russia	7 May 2018	8 May 2018	2016 (7th)	Medvedev I United Russia
(10)	Dmitry Medvedev (born 1965)		United Russia	8 May 2018	15 January 2020	2016 (7th)	Medvedev II; United Russia
—	Dmitry Medvedev (born 1965)		United Russia	15 January 2020	16 January 2020	2016 (7th)	Medvedev II; United Russia
11	Mikhail Mishustin (born 1966)		Independent	16 January 2020	30 April 2020 (Note: De facto termination of duties, de jure remained in office)	2016 (7th)	Mishustin I United Russia
—	Andrey Belousov (born 1959)		Independent	30 April 2020 (Note: Temporarily Acting Prime Minister in connection with the diagnosed COVID-19 of the current Prime Minister Mikhail Mishustin)	19 May 2020	2016 (7th)	Mishustin I United Russia
(11)	Mikhail Mishustin (born 1966)		Independent	19 May 2020	7 May 2024	2016 (7th)	Mishustin I United Russia
(11)	Mikhail Mishustin (born 1966)		Independent	19 May 2020	7 May 2024	2021 (8th)	Mishustin I United Russia
—	Mikhail Mishustin (born 1966)		Independent	7 May 2024	10 May 2024	2021 (8th)	Mishustin I United Russia
(11)	Mikhail Mishustin (born 1966)		Independent	10 May 2024	Incumbent	2021 (8th)	Mishustin II; United Russia • LDPR
