= Sergey Kiriyenko =

Prime Minister of Russia In 1998

- Сергей Кириенко
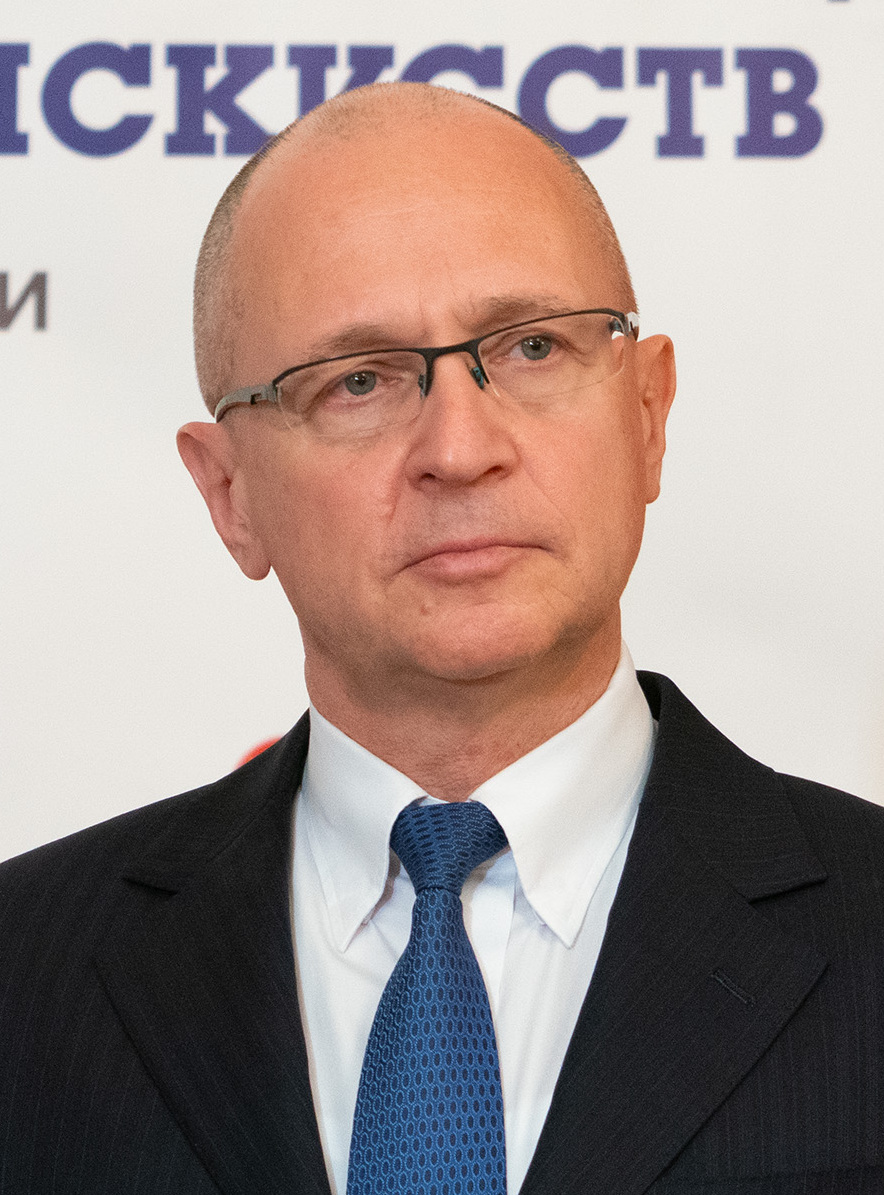
- Kiriyenko in 2025

First Deputy Kremlin Chief of Staff
- Incumbent
- Assumed office 5 October 2016 Serving with Alexey Gromov
- President: Vladimir Putin
- Preceded by: Vyacheslav Volodin

Presidential Envoy to the Volga Federal District
- In office 18 May 2000 – 14 November 2005
- President: Vladimir Putin
- Preceded by: Position established
- Succeeded by: Aleksandr Konovalov

Prime Minister of Russia
- In office 23 March 1998 – 23 August 1998; Acting: 23 March – 24 April 1998
- President: Boris Yeltsin
- Deputy: Boris Nemtsov; Himself
- Preceded by: Viktor Chernomyrdin
- Succeeded by: Viktor Chernomyrdin (Acting); Yevgeny Primakov

First Deputy Prime Minister
- In office 23 March 1998 – 24 April 1998
- Prime Minister: Himself (Acting)
- Preceded by: Boris Nemtsov
- Succeeded by: Yuri Maslyukov

Minister of Fuel and Energy
- In office 20 November 1997 – 23 March 1998
- Prime Minister: Viktor Chernomyrdin
- Preceded by: Boris Nemtsov
- Succeeded by: Viktor Ott (Acting); Sergey Generalov

Personal details
- Born: Sergey Vladilenovich Izraitel; 26 July 1962 (age 64) Sukhumi, Abkhaz ASSR, Georgian SSR, Soviet Union
- Party: Communist Party of the Soviet Union (1980–1991); Union of Right Forces (1998–2008); Independent (1991–1998 and since 2008)
- Spouse: Maria V. Kiriyenko
- Children: 3, including Vladimir

Sergey Vladilenovich Kiriyenko (Note: In this name that follows East Slavic naming customs, the patronymic is Vladilenovich and the family name is Kiriyenko.) (né Izraitel; Russian: Серге́й Владиле́нович Кирие́нко; born 26 July 1962) is a Russian politician who has served as First Deputy Chief of Staff of the Presidential Administration of Russia since 5 October 2016. He previously served as the 30th Prime Minister of Russia from 23 March to 23 August 1998 under President Boris Yeltsin, and was head of the Rosatom nuclear energy company between 2005 and 2016. Kiriyenko was the youngest Prime Minister of Russia, taking the position at age 35. Ideologically a technocrat, he has played a leading role in the governance of Russian-occupied territories of Ukraine since the Russian invasion of Ukraine, as well as in Russian electoral interference activities in Moldova and Hungary.

== Early life ==
Sergei Kiriyenko's Jewish father, Vladilen Israitel, made his name as a doctor of philosophy. Sergei Kiriyenko was born in Sukhumi, the capital of the Abkhaz ASSR, and grew up in Sochi, in southern Russia. He adopted the Ukrainian surname of his mother. After graduation from high school, Kiriyenko enrolled in the shipbuilding faculty at the Nizhny Novgorod (Gorky) Water Transport Engineers Institute, where his divorced father taught.

== Prime Minister of Russia (1998) ==
Kiriyenko was appointed acting Prime Minister after the dismissal of Viktor Chernomyrdin's Second Cabinet by President Boris Yeltsin on 23 March 1998. On 20 April, Kiriyenko met U.S. Deputy Secretary of State Strobe Talbot and assured him that his government would continue the economic reform program. The State Duma, dominated by the Communist Party of the Russian Federation, twice refused to confirm his appointment, but Yeltsin nominated him a third time and threatened to dissolve the parliament. Kiriyenko was confirmed on 24 April. His cabinet included many key ministers from the previous one, including Boris Nemtsov as a Deputy Prime Minister.

Russians would popularly call the nomination of Kiriyenko "Kinder Surprise", a reference to both the unexpectedness of such an appointment and his youth at the time of his appointment. His appointment was assisted by Deputy Prime Minister Boris Nemtsov, who later became a leading critic of and activist against Vladimir Putin's government. Along with Nemtsov and Anatoly Chubais, Kiriyenko was known during the late 1990s as part of a group of "young reformers", who sought wide-reaching overhauls to the economic system. This was in contrast with his immediate predecessor, the more moderate Viktor Chernomyrdin. Kiriyenko's premiership was noted in hindsight for the appointment of Vladimir Putin as Director of the Federal Security Service, eventually leading to his accession to the presidency in 2000.

In June 1998, Kiriyenko submitted an austerity plan to the IMF while seeking a $10 billion loan to stabilize Russian financial markets. Kiriyenko asked the State Duma on 1 July 1998 to quickly approve the plan. He said that it was the only way to prevent a crisis and that he would resign if it does not work. But the austerity plan was not approved due to Communist opposition, which contributed to the August 1998 Russian financial crisis. The IMF and the United States refused to provide more financial assistance, and Kiriyenko's cabinet defaulted the GKO-OFZ government bond coupons, which led to devaluation of the Russian ruble and the financial crisis. Kiriyenko took responsibility for the crisis and resigned on 23 August. Yeltsin replaced him with Chernomyrdin as acting Prime Minister. The fall of the Kiriyenko government left a political vacuum that was not filled until September, when Yevgeny Primakov assumed the premiership and took economic policy in a different direction.

=== Libel lawsuit ===
In 2004, Novaya Gazeta printed seven articles by columnist Georgy Rozhnov, which accused Kiriyenko of embezzling US$4.8 billion of IMF funds in 1998 when he was Prime Minister of Russia. The newspaper based the accusations on a letter allegedly written to Colin Powell and signed by US Congressmen Philip Crane, Mike Pence, Charlie Norwood, Dan Burton and Henry Bonilla and posted on the website of the American Defense Council. The newspaper went on to claim that Kiriyenko had used some of the embezzled funds to purchase real estate in the United States. The Moscow newspaper, The eXile, announced it had sent the letter as a prank, but later claimed that this had been a joke. In response, Kiriyenko sued Novaya Gazeta and Rozhnov for libel, and in passing judgement in favour of Kiriyenko the court ordered Novaya Gazeta to retract all publications relating to the accusations. The court noted "Novaya gazeta's content on the missing IMF funds include a great deal of unproven information" and also went on to order the newspaper "to publish only officially proven information linking Mr Kiriyenko with embezzlement."

== Union of Right Forces (1999) ==
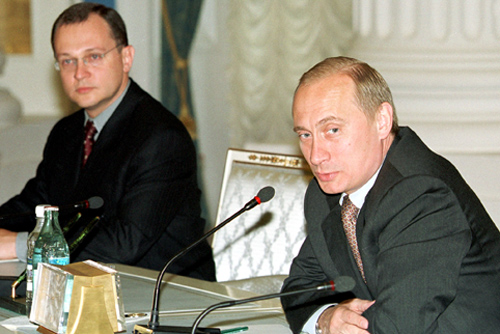
Sergey Kiriyenko (left) and Russian President Vladimir Putin, 2000

Together with Boris Nemtsov and Irina Hakamada and along with others, Kiriyenko formed the Union of Right Forces. Kiriyenko led the party in the 1999 legislative election. The party finished fourth in the election, receiving 29 seats. Kiriyenko headed the parliamentary group of the party.

Since 2000 Kiriyenko has held the federal state civilian service rank of 1st class Active State Councillor of the Russian Federation.

== Rosatom (2005–2016) ==
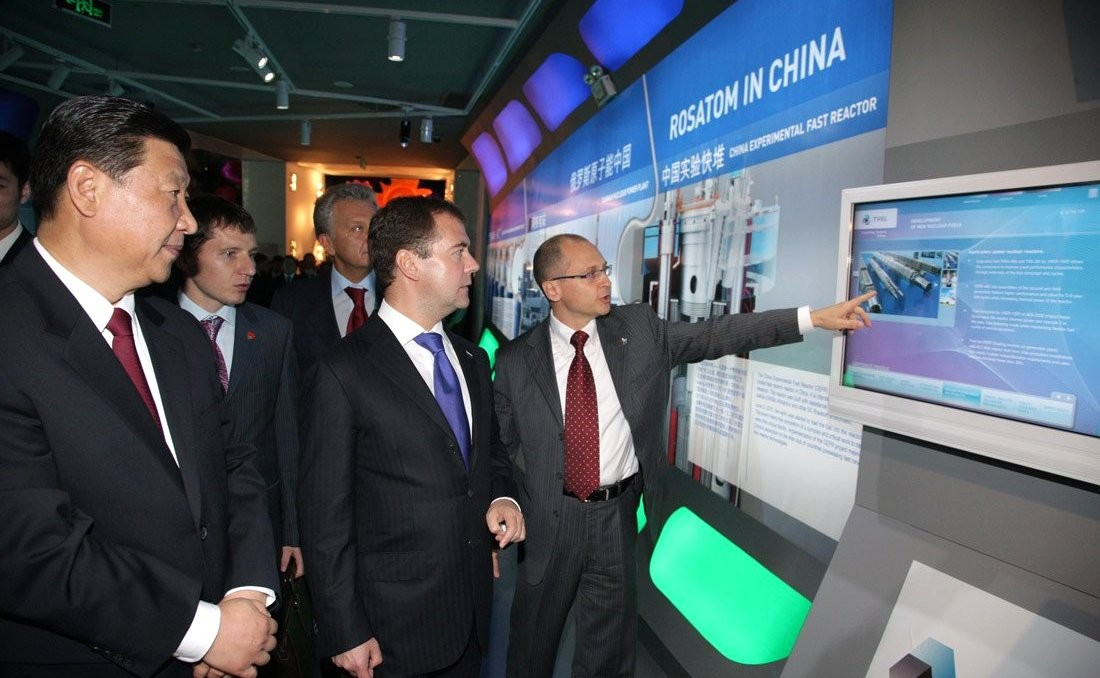
Kiriyenko, Russian President Dmitry Medvedev and Chinese Vice President Xi Jinping, 2010

Kiriyenko was appointed to head Rosatom, the Federal Atomic Energy Agency, on 30 November 2005 by Mikhail Fradkov's Second Cabinet during the second term of President Vladimir Putin. He was also appointed by the same administration to chair the board of directors of the vertically integrated Atomenergoprom nuclear company in July 2007.

Kiriyenko said on 18 September 2006 while in Vienna, that the reactor in the Bushehr nuclear plant in Iran should be operational by September 2007 and the plant itself will be active in November 2007. He advocated President Vladimir Putin's idea of creating an international system of uranium enrichment centers. A uranium enrichment center could be operational in Russia in 2007. Responding to a reporter's question, Kiriyenko said that the Bushehr power plant would not affect nuclear non-proliferation and that there was nothing preventing Iran-Russia energy cooperation. The Government of Russia planned to deliver nuclear fuel to the plant in March 2007. After a delay of some three years, Kiriyenko said 21 August 2010's arrival of nuclear fuel at Iran's Bushehr I marks "an event of crucial importance" that proves that "Russia always fulfills its international obligations." Spent nuclear fuel from the plant will be sent back to Russia.

Kiriyenko was replaced as General Director of Rosatom on 5 October 2016 by Alexey Likhachev, former Deputy Minister for Economic Development.

It came to light in July 2018 that for his work in Rosatom Kiriyenko was awarded by a confidential decree a Hero of Russia honorary title.

== First deputy chief of staff to President Putin ==
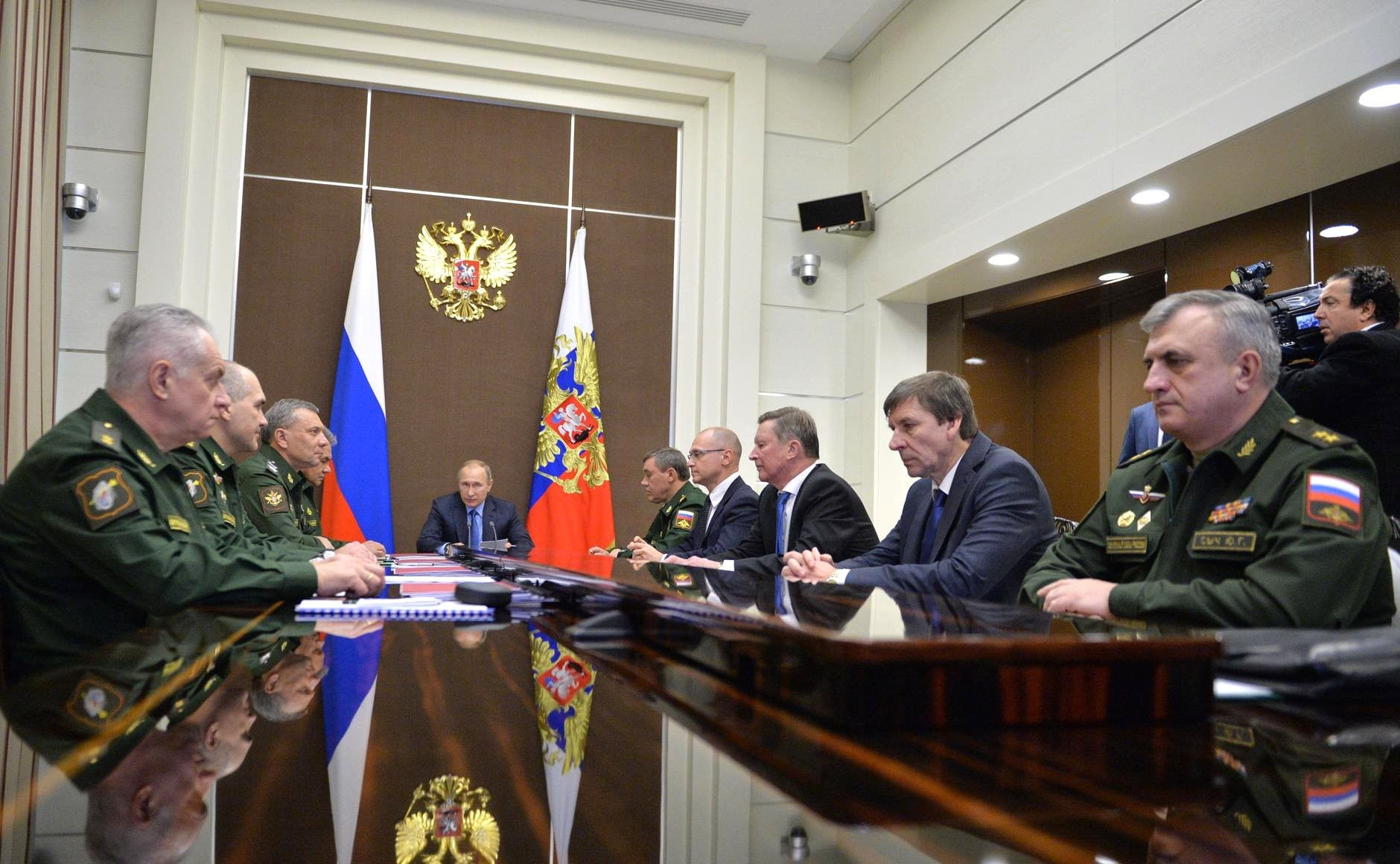
Meeting on developing new types of weapons, 2016

In October 2016 Kiriyenko was appointed First Deputy Chief of Staff in Putin's administration. The position has significant status within the Russian government, with The Moscow Times referring to Kiriyenko as "Putin's right-hand man" and a "gray cardinal" following the appointment.

Kiriyenko spoke publicly about the need to work with Russian youth and their fondness for debauched hip-hop, most notably in response to the crackdown in late 2018.

Vadim Prokhorov, one of his former colleagues, described him as "a very flexible man [ideologically], who will never go against the wind."

=== Administrator of occupied Ukraine ===
Following the beginning of the Russian invasion of Ukraine, Kiriyenko's portfolio as First Deputy Chief of Staff was expanded to cover administration of Russian-occupied territories of Ukraine. By June 2022 it was reported by Meduza and Bloomberg News that Kiriyenko had been entrusted with managing the occupied territories, a role that earned him the popular nickname "Viceroy of the Donbas". Kiriyenko has continued to influence Russian domestic policy since the invasion, including allegedly preventing the cancellation of the 2022 Russian gubernatorial elections.

On 5 May 2022 it was reported that Kiriyenko visited the Russian-occupied city of Mariupol, taking part in the unveiling of a statue of an old woman holding the Soviet flag. Kiriyenko said that "Babushka Anya is a symbol of the motherland for the entire" Russian world.

On 6 June Kiriyenko visited occupied Kherson, and it was reported by the Ukrainian mayor of Kherson, Ihor Kolykhaiev, that the occupiers had conducted a meeting of more than 70 Russian sympathisers aimed at conducting a referendum on the region integrating the occupied areas into Russia. Kolykhaiev's sources told him that the dates discussed were two: in September or at the end of 2022. A Russian election happens on 11 September and the Kherson vote would be scheduled to coincide that day. An elected official in Russia named Igor Kastyukevich had discussed this plan on 7 June, following the visit of Kiriyenko. By June, Russian occupational forces in Kherson had begun adjusting the local curriculum to match Russia's, and Russian SIM cards were on the market. Kolykhaiev also witnessed Russian forces distributing Russian passports to Kherson residents.

In late 2022, Russian opposition politician Nikita Yuferev accused Kiriyenko of violating Russia's 2022 war censorship laws.

=== Russian disinformation and electoral interference activities ===
In September 2024, the United States Justice Department asserted that Kiriyenko had created some 30 internet domains to spread Russian disinformation, including on Elon Musk's X which was formerly known as Twitter. In October 2024, the Wall Street Journal disclosed that Musk had been in contact with Kiriyenko and Vladimir Putin which Dmitry Peskov affirmed.

Kiriyenko played an integral role in Russian electoral interference activities (vote buying networks, bribery, bots and troll farms, orchestrated protests) in the 2025 Moldovan parliamentary election and was assigned to covertly support the campaign of Viktor Orbán, then Prime Minister of Hungary, for the 2026 Hungarian parliamentary election.

=== Sanctions ===
While Kiriyenko was in office, he was sanctioned by both the United Kingdom and European Union (amongst the list of six individuals and one organization) on 15 October 2020 over the Alexei Navalny poisoning. Navalny, an opponent of Putin's, was poisoned on 20 August 2020, while travelling on a flight inside Russia.

On 21 February 2022, after Putin officially recognized the Luhansk People's Republic and Donetsk People's Republic as independent from Ukraine, other countries began to sanction Russian individuals and companies. On 22 February 2022, US President Joe Biden imposed sanctions on Kiriyenko, along with his son Vladimir for their connections to the Russian government.

== Family ==
Kiriyenko's son Vladimir was appointed CEO of the influential Russian social network VKontakte in December 2021, after the controversial takeover of VKontakte by companies affiliated with state-owned gas giant Gazprom, in what critics said was a sign of the Kremlin tightening its grip over the social media network. Critics have accused the company of sharing user's data with Russia's security services.

== See also ==
- Sergei Kiriyenko's Cabinet

== Notes ==
Political offices
Preceded by Viktor Chernomyrdin	Prime Minister of Russia; 1998	Succeeded by Viktor Chernomyrdin; Acting
Diplomatic posts
Preceded by Position created	Presidential Envoy to the Volga Federal District; 18 May 2000 – 14 November 2005	Succeeded by Aleksandr Konovalov
