= Aleksandr Livshits =

- Александр Лившиц
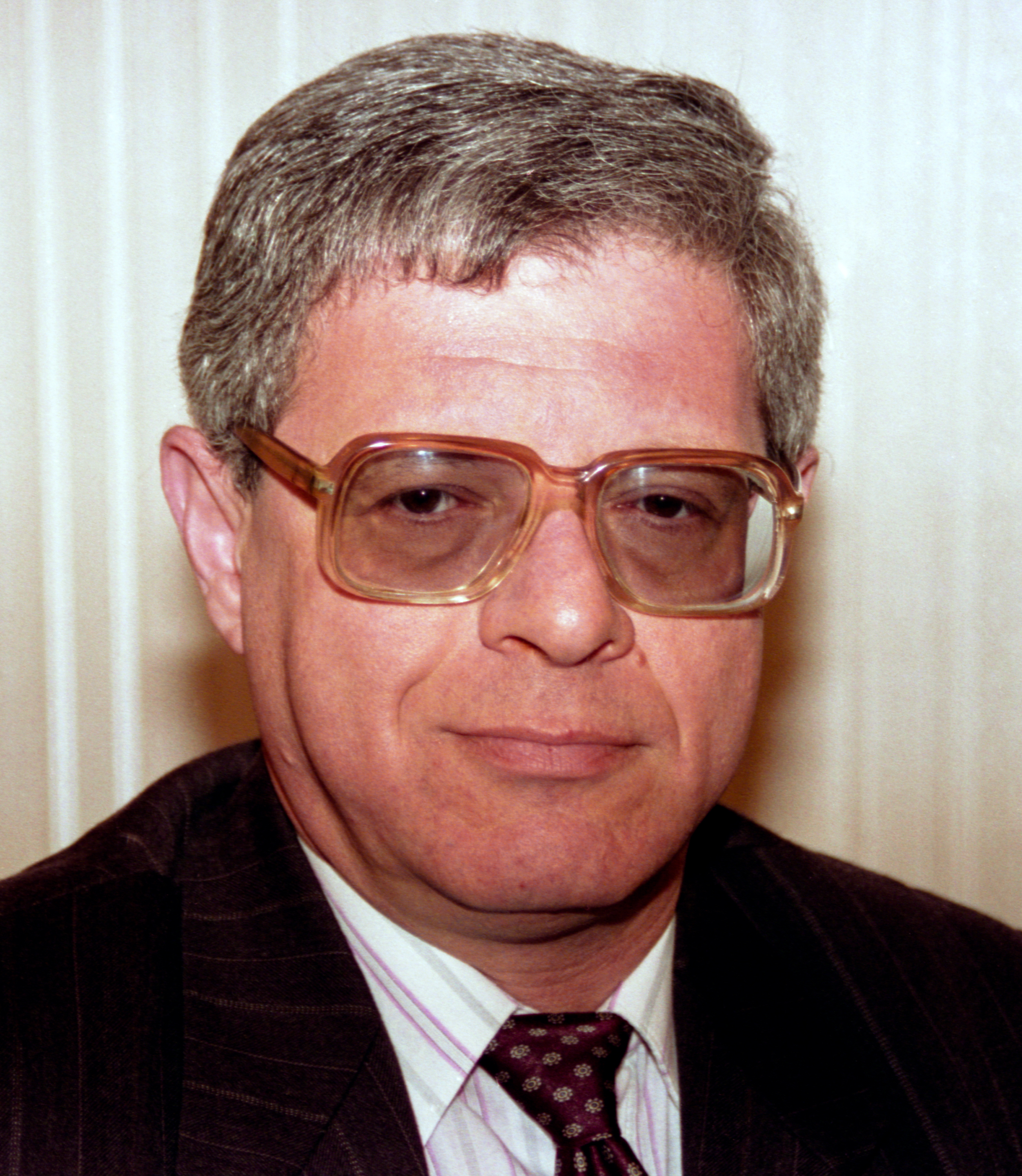
- Livshits in 1996

Minister of Finance
- In office 14 August 1996 – 17 March 1997
- Preceded by: Vlaidmir Panskov
- Succeeded by: Anatoly Chubais

Personal details
- Born: Aleksandr Yavlyevich Livshits; 6 September 1946 Berlin, Germany
- Died: 25 April 2013 (aged 66) Moscow, Russia
- Spouse: Galina Timofeyevna Livshits
- Children: Yelena; Natalya
- Aleksandr Livshits' voice Livshits on the Echo of Moscow program, 30 August 2007

Aleksandr Yakovlevich Livshits (Russian: Александр Яковлевич Лившиц; 6 September 1946 – 25 April 2013), was a Russian politician and economist who served as the minister of finance and deputy prime minister of Russia from 1996 to 1997.

He also served as the assistant to the president of Russia from 1994 to 1996.

After politics, he served as the vice president of the holding company "Russian Aluminum" from 2001 until his death in 2013.

== Biography ==
Aleksandr Livshits was born on 6 September 1946 in Berlin to the family of servicemen. His father, Yakov Lazarevich, born on 9 February 1914 in Yekaterinoslav (present-day Dnipro) was an army officer, historian, teacher, and had graduated from MIFLI, and was a member of the CPSU(b), went to the front as a volunteer in July 1941. While retaining his party card and weapons, he left the encirclement. His father died in Moscow in 2002.

His mother, Liya Mikhailovna, née Vesbland (1918–1993), was a historian, teacher, and had graduated from MIFLI.

His uncle, Eduard born in 1906, was the Deputy Minister of Automobile Transport and Highways of the Soviet Union, and was a member of the Communist Party of the Soviet Union. He was then director of the Moscow Experimental Plant of Loading Machines. In October 1950, his uncle was arrested on participation in the k.-r. nationalist organization and complicity in espionage. He was executed on 24 November 1950.

After graduating from school in 1960, he entered the Moscow Technical School of Automation and Telemechanics.

In 1966, he joined the Communist Party of the Soviet Union.

In 1971, he graduated from the Moscow Institute of National Economy. G. V. Plekhanov, majoring in economic cybernetics.

From 1974 to 1992 he worked at the Moscow Machine Tool Institute in various positions, heading the department of political economy. In 1974, he defended his Ph.D. thesis on the topic “Economic expansion of German imperialism in the period of preparation for the Second World War.”

In April 1992, he was the Deputy Head of the Analytical Center of the Presidential Administration.

In September 1993, he became a member of the working group for operational analytical support of constitutional reform measures.

On 2 March 1994, as part of the group of experts under the president of Russia, Livshits became the assistant to the president on economic issues.

On 5 July 1996, in an interview with the Interfax agency, Livshits said that the Russian economy was “moving from a survival model to a development mode, shaping an economic course.” The presidential aide called “increasing investment activity and production growth” the goals of the Russian economic policy at the current stage. According to Livshits, the government should, by the end of 1996, deal with the issues of reorienting internal financial flows towards the production sector and improving the quality of financial management at the enterprise level. The priority, in his opinion, remains the need to “normalize the budget situation.” The presidential aide described this problem as a priority for the new cabinet. In his opinion, there are several specific ways to solve it. These include, in particular, an increase in revenues to the federal budget. According to him, "this can be achieved by expanding the tax base, by eliminating various benefits".

Livshits said, that “It is possible, Lwe will have to carry out an operation similar to the one that took place at the beginning of last year, when there was a massive cancellation of benefits for foreign economic activity.” Livshits called equally effective steps to normalize the budget situation, in particular, lowering rates and tightening control over tax collection, including increasing liability for tax evasion. The presidential aide expressed the opinion that the new cabinet will have to regulate relations with regional budgets. Livshits said that in that regard, measures are needed to expand the access of non-residents to the government securities market.

In the summer of 1996, he was member of the Security Council of the Russia.

On 9 August, Livshits called the problem of tax collection “a matter of life and death,” while noting positive changes in this process. He emphasized that of those 19.9 trillion., half of the rubles collected in July are treasury tax exemptions, but compared to June, the increase in “real” money received is 30%. “And this despite the fact that a number of measures to increase tax collection have not yet been implemented. We are talking about streamlining all kinds of benefits.” Livshits identified two types of benefits: legislative, which, according to the government, amount to 100 trillion rubles, and executive benefits, which are estimated at 20 trillion rubles.

On 14 August 1996, Livshits became the minister of finance, as well as the deputy prime minister of Russia. In accordance with the new tasks set for the government, the Ministry of Finance was assigned the functions of controlling expenses and revenues in the federal budget. After the appointment, the media published excerpts from his speeches on current problems of the Russian economy.

In an interview with Izvestia on 20 August, Livshits said: “My dream is that there will be no visitors to the Ministry of Finance. And there will be none only if the budget law is unconditionally implemented. What is required According to the law, we will give, but what is not in the law, don’t ask, you won’t get. Then visitors will appear at the Ministry of Finance only once a year, during the formation of the budget.”

The newspaper “Time and Money” 28 November, called the undoubted merit of Livshits, “a sharp decrease in the level of inflation and the strengthening of the ruble, the abandonment of unsecured emissions. a reduction in the yield of government short-term bonds (GKOs), as well as the decision of the Ministry of Finance to abandon treasury tax exemptions (TEEs) and other monetary substitutes."

On 17 March 1997, after Livshits was dismissed and replaced by his successor Antoly Chubais, he became the deputy head of the presidential administration of Russia.

In June 1997, he became the representative of the president of the Russian Federation in the National Banking Council.

In August 1998, he was the head of the Economic Policy Foundation.

In November 1998, he hosted the program “Ask Livshits” on the NTV channel. Then for 10 years he wrote a weekly column in the Izvestia newspaper.

In June 1999, Livshits was the minister of Russia, as the special representative of the president in the G8.

In 2000, he was the chairman of the board of the Russian Credit Bank.

In July 2001, he was appointed deputy general director of Russian Aluminum OJSC, Director for International and Special Projects.

He died on 25 April 2013 from acute heart failure. He was buried on 29 April at the Danilovsky cemetery (site 14e).

== Political views ==
Livshits advocated for a confederation of “democratic” states of the former Soviet Union. He believed that the Russian economy is becoming a market economy, but primitively, a loss of technology. As a result, the country is losing part of its economic sovereignty, with PostFactum agency, in March 1995.

At the beginning of 1996, Livshits called on his colleagues not to receive salaries until the salary arrears in the public sector were eliminated.

== Literacy ==
He is the author of one of the first textbooks on market policy, “Introduction to Market Economics.” The book was also published in Georgian by Tbilisi State University in February 1996.

== Personal life ==
In an interview with the newspaper “Imya” on 26 April 1996, Livshits said that he started studying economics because he liked mathematics as a child: “Mathematics was the most interesting subject in the school curriculum for me.”

According to the recollections of colleagues from Rusal, Livshits was distinguished by a sophisticated sense of humor. He constantly wore tinted glasses, like the idol of his youth, the Polish actor Zbigniew Cybulski. He preferred to vacation with his family abroad due to, as Alexander Yakovlevich himself ironically explained, “his physiognomy is too recognizable in Russia.” The economist's hobby was making fires in any weather.

He loved popsicles as a child.

He was fluent in English.

== Family ==
He was married to his wife, Galina Timofeyevna Livshits, who had been an engineer and worked at a military plant for 25 years and since then retired as a housewife in 1994. She has two daughters, Yelena and Natalya.
