= Oleg Davydov =

Russian economist

- Олег Давыдов

Deputy Prime Minister of Russia
- In office 9 November 1994 – 1 April 1997
- President: Boris Yeltsin
- Prime Minister: Viktor Chernomyrdin

Minister of Foreign Economic Relations
- In office 22 September 1993 – 1 April 1997
- President: Boris Yeltsin
- Prime Minister: Viktor Chernomyrdin
- Preceded by: Sergey Glazyev
- Succeeded by: Ministry abolished

Personal details
- Born: Oleg Dmitriyevich Davydov; May 25, 1940 Moscow
- Died: December 22, 2006 (aged 66) Moscow
- Occupation: Politician
- Profession: Economist

Oleg Dmitriyevich Davydov (Russian: Оле́г Дми́триевич Давы́дов; 25 May 1940 – 22 December 2006) was a Russian economist who formerly served in the Russian government of Prime Minister Viktor Chernomyrdin as the minister and Deputy Chairman of Government responsible for foreign economic relations. In this position he led negotiations for Russia's first bid to join the World Trade Organization.

== Career in government ==
After being appointed Deputy Prime Minister for foreign trade in the fall of 1993, he began to liberalize Russia's export regulations in order to appeal to Western economic partners. This was also part of an effort to eventually join the World Trade Organization. The first meeting with WTO officials took place in July 1995, with Davydov leading the Russian delegation, but the process to enter was postponed after the 1998 Russian financial crisis.

Davydov paid a visit to Tehran and praised increased Russian–Iranian cooperation in 1995. In Europe he negotiated to reschedule Russia's debt payments to some six hundred banks. In September of that year, at an economic forum in Beijing, Davydov stated that Russia's strategic goal is to increase cooperation with Asia-Pacific countries. In March 1996 he identified China as the country's main strategic partner in the region. Davydov stated: "Moscow's turn to the Asian Pacific region is dictated by its firm conviction that the center of global trade in the 21st century will move to this region, which already accounts for 40 percent of global turnover." Later, in December of the same year, he traveled to Singapore and met with then-Brigadier General Lee Hsien Loong, future Prime Minister of Singapore.

In 1997 Davydov also referred to India as an important strategic partner for Russia, stating that the country did not allow Ukraine a license to export parts of T-80 and other tanks, as the Russian government did not want Ukraine to sell it to India's traditional adversary Pakistan.

== Death ==
He died on 22 December 2006.

== Other work ==
In 2000, he worked with Valery Oreshkin to publish a book titled Liberalization of Russian Foreign Trade: Problems and Prospects.

== Sources ==
=== Books ===
- Berger, Mark (1997). The Rise of East Asia: Critical Visions of the Pacific Century. Routledge. ISBN 978-0415161688.
- Parrish, Scott (1996). The OMRI Annual Survey of Eastern Europe and the Former Soviet Union: 1995: Building Democracy. Routledge. ISBN 978-1563249242.
