= Viktor Ilyushin =

Russian politician (born 1947)

- Виктор Илюшин
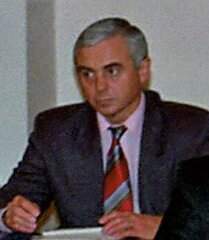
- Ilyushin in 1995

First Deputy Prime Minister of Russia
- In office 14 August 1996 – 17 March 1997 Serving with Vladimir Potanin and Alexei Bolshakov
- Prime Minister: Viktor Chernomyrdin
- Preceded by: Oleg Lobov
- Succeeded by: Anatoly Chubais and Boris Nemtsov

Personal details
- Born: 4 June 1947 (age 79) Nizhny Tagil, Sverdlovsk Oblast, Russian SFSR, Soviet Union

Viktor Vasilyevich Ilyushin (Russian: Виктор Васильевич Илюшин; born 4 June 1947) is a Russian politician who served as First Deputy Prime Minister of Russia and assistant to President of Russia from 14 August 1996 to 17 March 1997. He has the federal state civilian service rank of 1st class Active State Councillor of the Russian Federation.
