= Yakov Urinson =

Russian politician (born 1944)

- Яков Уринсон
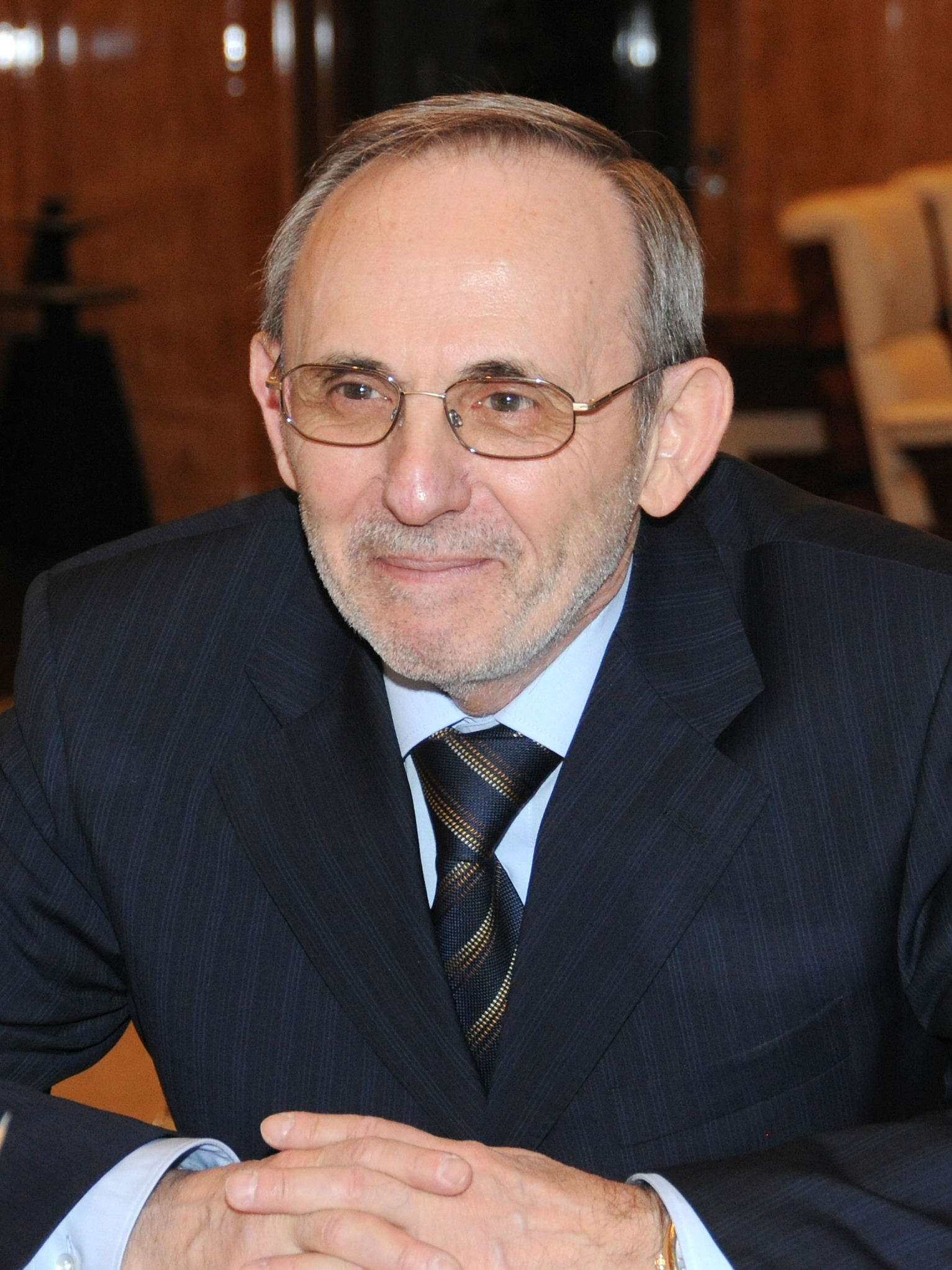
- Urinson in 2010

Minister of Economy
- In office 17 March 1997 – 25 September 1998
- Prime Minister: Viktor Chernomyrdin
- Preceded by: Yevgeny Yasin
- Succeeded by: Andrey Shapovalyants

Personal details
- Born: 12 September 1944 (age 82) Moscow, RSFSR, Soviet Union
- Education: Moscow Institute of National Economy

Yakov Moiseyevich Urinson (Russian: Я́ков Моисе́евич Уринсо́н; born 12 September 1944) is a Russian politician of Jewish descent, economist and Russian Deputy Prime Minister, Minister of the Russian economy in 1997–1998, Member of the Presidium of the Russian Jewish Congress.
