= Yevgeny Yasin =

Russian economist (1934–2023)

- Евгений Ясин
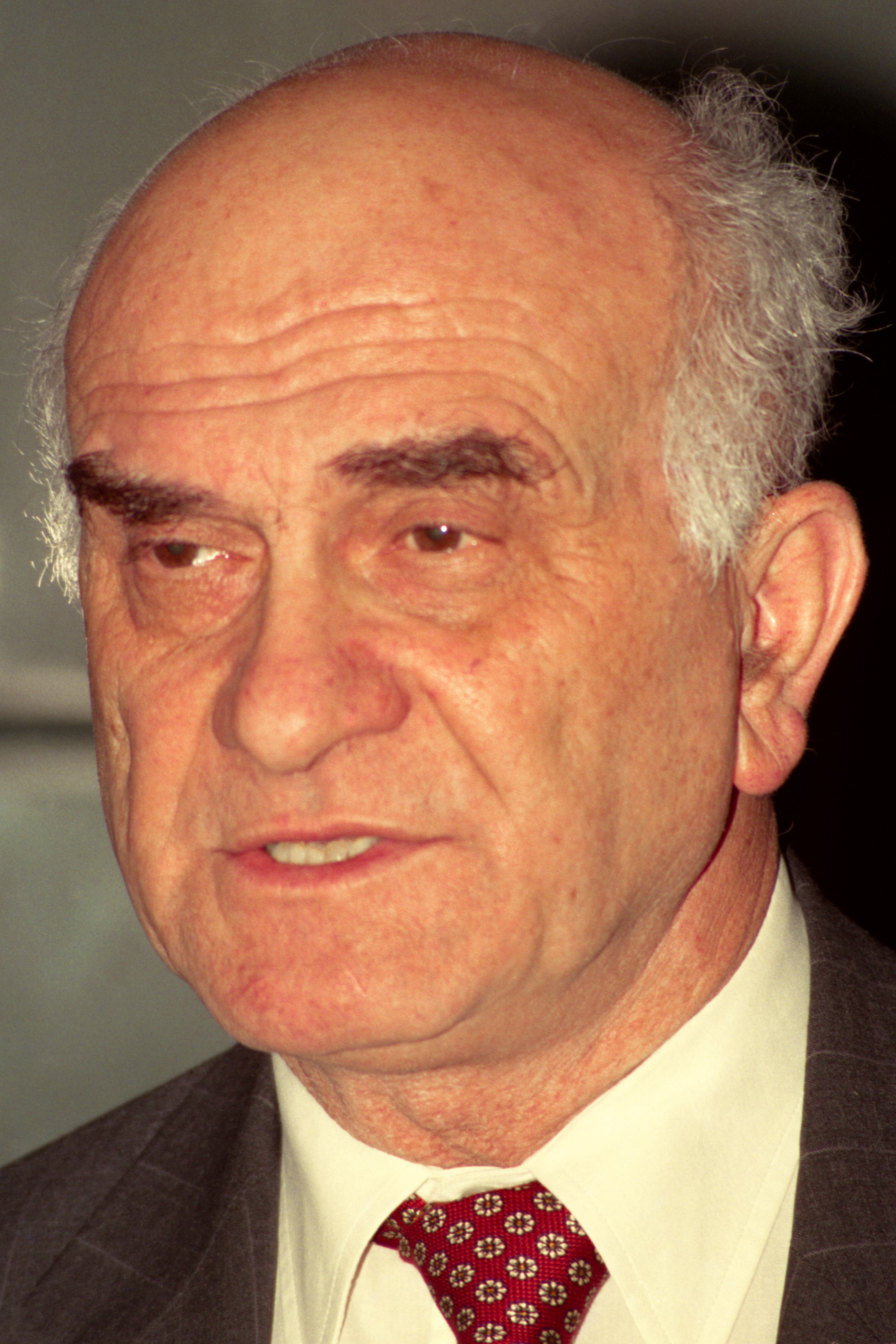
- Yasin in 1996

Minister of Economy
- In office 8 November 1994 – 17 March 1997
- Prime Minister: Viktor Chernomyrdin
- Preceded by: Alexander Shokhin
- Succeeded by: Yakov Urinson

Personal details
- Born: Yevgeny Grigoryevich Yasin; 7 May 1934 Odesa, Ukrainian SSR, Soviet Union
- Died: 25 September 2023 (aged 89)
- Awards

Yevgeny Grigoryevich Yasin (Russian: Евгений Григорьевич Ясин; Ukrainian: Євге́н Григо́рович Я́син; 7 May 1934 – 25 September 2023) was a Russian economist. He served as the economy minister of Russia from 1994 to 1997. Until July 2021, he was an academic supervisor at the National Research University Higher School of Economics. He was a regular contributor to the Echo of Moscow radio station.

== Biography ==
Yevgeny Yasin was born into a Jewish family in Odesa, Ukrainian SSR, on 7 May 1934.

In 1957, he graduated from the Odesa Institute of Civil Construction, and in 1963, from the Moscow State University (MSU) Faculty of Economics. In 1968, he defended his thesis for the degree of the Candidate of Science. In 1976 – Doctor of Economics, and since 1979 – Professor. From 1958 to 1960, Yasin was an engineer at the Design Institute Number 3 of the Committee of Civil Engineering, Ukrainian SSR. After graduating from MSU, from 1964 to 1973, he worked at the Research Institute of the Central Department of Statistics as head of department and later head of laboratory.

From 1973 to 1989, he headed a laboratory at the Central Institute of Economics and Mathematics, USSR Academy of Sciences. In 1978, Yasin led the Department on Economic Reform in the State Commission of the USSR Council of Ministers. He was one of the key authors of a number of programmes on the transition to a market economy, including the well-known programme "500 days".

In 1991, he went from the USSR Government Office to the Scientific and Industrial Union of the USSR – today called the Russian Union of Industrialists and Entrepreneurs (Employers) (RSPP) – as director for economic policy. In November 1991, he created the Expert Institute as part of this organization and became its head.

From January 1992, Yasin worked as director of the RSPP and at the same time as an authorized representative of the Russian Government in the Supreme Council of the Russian Federation. In 1993, he was appointed head of a work group under the chairman of the Government of the RF and actively participated in the development of economic programmes. In April 1994, he became head of the Analytical Center under the president of the Russian Federation.

In November 1994, Yasin was appointed head of the Ministry of Economic Development of the Russian Federation, and in April 1997 – Minister of the Russian Federation.

From October 1998, he was the academic supervisor of the Higher School of Economics and president of the Expert Institute. From 2000 - President of the "Liberalnaya Missiya" ("Liberal Mission") Foundation. Its board members include his daughter Irina Yasina, Igor Klyamkin, Alexander Arkhangelsky, Jochen Wermuth, Dmitry Zimin, Georgy Satarov, Lilia Shevtsova, and others.

Until September 2009, he was a member of the Federal Political Council of the "Union of Rightist Forces", but when President Vladimir Putin named him a member of the Civic Chamber of the Russian Federation, he cancelled his membership in the party.

Yevgeny Yasin died on 25 September 2023, at the age of 89.

== Titles ==
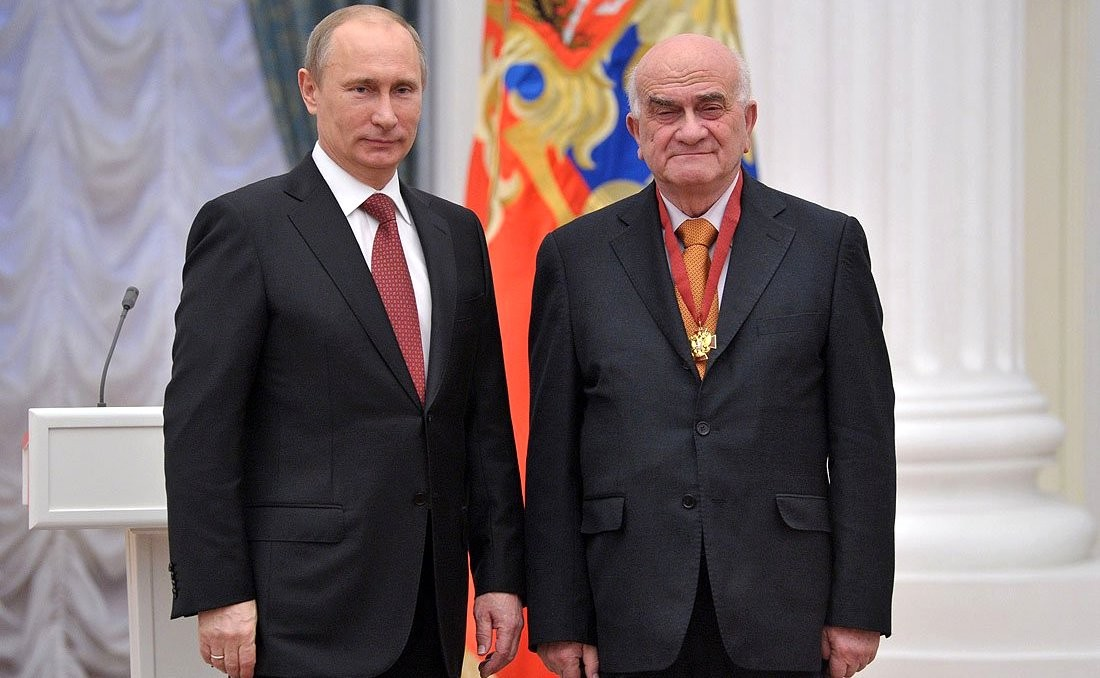
Russian president Vladimir Putin and Yasin, awarded with the Order of Merit for the Fatherland, 3rd class, December 2012

- Academic Supervisor of the Higher School of Economics (HSE)
- President of the ‘Liberalnaya Missiya' (‘Liberal Mission') Foundation
- President of the Scientific Non-Commercial Foundation ‘Expert Institute' (Exin)
- Member of the Russian Federation Public Chamber Commission on Education and Science (2008)
- Member of the European Academy of Sciences
- Honorary Professor at the Jilin University (People's Republic of China)
- Doctor Honoris Causa at the University of Birmingham (Great Britain)
- Chairman of the Dissertation Council on Economic Sciences, HSE
- Professor at the HSE Department of Statistics
