= Valery Serov =

Russian politician (1940–2026)

- Валерий Серов
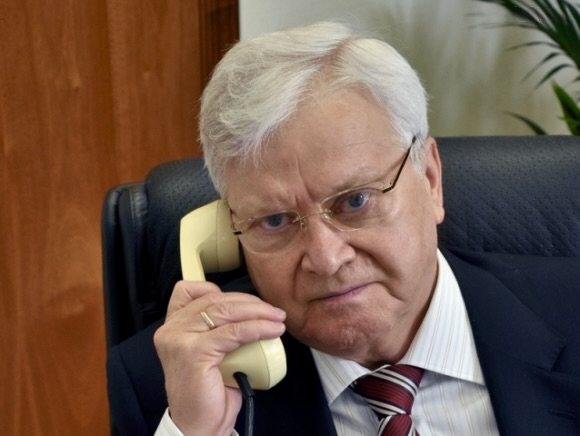
- Serov in 2016

Chairman of the State Committee for Construction
- In office 17 July 1989 – 14 November 1991
- Preceded by: Yury Batalin
- Succeeded by: position abolished

Personal details
- Born: Valery Mikhailovich Serov; 15 April 1940 Moscow, Russian SFSR, Soviet Union
- Died: 11 July 2026 (aged 86) Moscow, Russia
- Party: CPSU
- Education: Moscow Institute of Civil Engineering
- Occupation: Civil engineer

Valery Mikhailovich Serov (Russian: Вале́рий Михайлович Серо́в; 15 April 1940 – 11 July 2026) was a Russian politician. A member of the Communist Party of the Soviet Union, he served as chairman of the State Committee for Construction from 1989 to 1991.

Serov died in Moscow on 11 July 2026, at the age of 86.
