= Vladimir Kadannikov =

Russian businessman and politician (1941–2021)

Vladimir Vasilyevich Kadannikov (Russian: Владимир Васильевич Каданников; 3 September 1941 – 3 June 2021) was a Russian businessman and politician who served as a Deputy Prime Minister of Russia (1996) in charge of economic policy, briefly replacing Anatoly Chubais, under President Boris Yeltsin.

== In government ==
Vladimir Kadannikov was born in Gorky, Soviet Union. By the early 1990s he was the head of AvtoVAZ, a Russian automobile manufacturing company. In January 1996, he was appointed to the cabinet as deputy head of government for economic affairs, replacing the architect of the privatization reforms, Anatoly Chubais. Kadannikov was viewed as an advocate of Russian industry, which suffered due to the reforms which favored foreign companies, being an ally of Oleg Soskovets, First Deputy Prime Minister and fellow "industrialist." He attempted to take measures to defend the industry, including the introduction of import tariffs, but this was blocked by the IMF. Kadannikov's appointment caused Western analysts to believe it was a shift away from the economic reforms overseen by Chubais. In August 1996 he was removed and replaced by Vladimir Potanin, and returned to working at AvtoVAZ as its CEO.

He died on 3 June 2021 in Moscow, Russia.

== Sources ==
=== Books ===
- Brown, J. F. (1997). Forging Ahead, Falling Behind. M.E. Sharpe. ISBN 978-1563249259.
- Cook, Bernard A. (2001). Europe Since 1945: An Encyclopedia, Volume 2. Taylor & Francis. ISBN 978-0815340584.
