= Forward, Russia! =

Forward, Russia! Вперёд, Россия!
- Leader: Boris Fyodorov
- Founder: Irina Khakamada
- Founded: February 18, 1995
- Dissolved: February 2, 2002
- Preceded by: Liberal Democratic Front; Union of December 12
- Merged into: Republican Party of Russia
- Headquarters: Moscow
- Ideology: Liberal democracy Liberal conservatism Patriotism; Conservatism
- Political position: Centre-right
- Colours: Black
- Slogan: "Forward, Russia!" (Russian: "Вперёд, Россия!")
- Seats in the State Duma 2 convening (1995–2000): 3 / 450

Forward, Russia! (Russian: Вперёд, Россия!; Vperyod, Rossiya!) was an electoral bloc and political movement led by Boris Fyodorov during the 1995 State Duma election. It later merged into the Republican Party of Russia.
