= Candidates in the 1996 Russian presidential election =

1996 Russian presidential candidates
- Opinion polls

This article contains the list of candidates associated with the 1996 Russian presidential election.

== Registered candidates ==
Candidate name, age, political party	Political offices	Campaign	Registration date
Vladimir Bryntsalov (49); Russian Socialist Party	Deputy of the State Duma (1996–2003)	campaign	26 April 1996
Mikhail Gorbachev (65); Independent	Leader of the Soviet Union; General Secretary of the Communist Party of the Soviet Union (1985–1991); President of the Soviet Union (1990–1991); Chairman of the Supreme Soviet (1989–1990); Chairman of the Presidum of the Supreme Soviet (1988–1989)	campaign	12 April 1996
Svyatoslav Fyodorov (69); Party of Workers' Self-Government	People's Deputy of the Soviet Union (1989–1991); Deputy of the State Duma (1996–2000)	campaign	19 April 1996
Alexander Lebed (46); Congress of Russian Communities	Deputy of the State Duma (1996)	campaign	19 April 1996
Martin Shakkum (44); Independent	Leader of the Socialist People's Party	campaign	22 April 1996
Yury Vlasov (60); Independent	Deputy of the State Duma (1994–1996)	campaign	26 April 1996
Grigory Yavlinsky (44); Yabloko	Chairman of Yabloko (1995–2008); Deputy of the State Duma (1994–2003)	campaign	19 April 1996
Boris Yeltsin (65); Independent	President of Russia (1991–1999)	campaign	3 April 1996
Vladimir Zhirinovsky (50); Liberal Democratic Party	Leader of the Liberal Democratic Party of Russia (1991–2022); Deputy of the State Duma (1994–2022)	campaign	5 April 1996
Gennady Zyuganov (52); Communist Party	First Secretary of the Central Committee of the Communist Party of the Russian Federation (1993–present); Deputy of the State Duma (1994–present)	campaign	4 March 1996

== Withdrawn candidates ==
Candidate name, age, political party	Political offices	Campaign	Details	Registration date	Date of withdrawal
Aman Tuleyev (52); Independent	Chairman of the Kemerovo Oblast Council of People's Deputies (1990–1993; 1994–1996; 2018)	campaign	He was registered as a candidate on 26 April 1996, but withdrew his candidacy on 8 June 1996 to support Gennady Zyuganov. Since Tuleyev withdrew his candidacy after the deadline, he was included in the ballots and even received 308 votes during the early voting.	26 April 1996	8 June 1996

== Rejected candidates ==
78 voter initiative groups were authorized by the Central Election Commission to collect signatures. However, only seventeen candidates managed to submit petitions with one million signatures by the deadline on April 16. Six of these were rejected by the Central Election Commission.

- Sergei Mavrodi, Head of MMM investment fund
- Vladimir Podoprigora, former member of the Federation Council
- Galina Starovoytova, leader of Democratic Russia, had turned in her petition the day before the deadline. Her candidacy was rejected due to irregularities with signatures. Unsuccessfully appealed to Supreme Court.
- Artyom Tarasov, millionaire businessman, candidacy rejected due to irregularities with signatures. Unsuccessfully appealed to Supreme Court.
- Lev Ubozhko, leader of the Conservative Party. Candidacy was rejected due to irregularities with signatures. Unsuccessfully appealed to Supreme court.
- Viacheslav Ushakov, President of the Moscow Investment Foundation Joint Stock Company. Candidacy was rejected due to irregularities with signatures. Unsuccessfully appealed to Supreme Court.

== Declared candidates who withdrew without registering ==
Candidates nominated by political movements and initiative groups who withdrew without registering
Candidate	Positions	Party/movement
Mavsar Kh. Aduev	Editor of World Democratic Union newspaper	Independent
Anatoly G. Akinin	Director of the Union of Manufacturing Concerns	Independent
Vladimir Aksyonov	Former cosmonaut	Independent
Aleksandr S. Alekseev	Chairman of National Association of Russian Trade Unions	National Labor Party
Viktor Anpilov	Head of Communists – Working Russia – For the Soviet Union electoral alliance {declined nomination, endorsed Zyuganov)	Russian Communist Workers Party
Alexander Barkashov	Leader of Russian National Unity	Russian National Unity
Tamara V. Bazyleva	President of Human Ecology International Concern	Independent
Vladimir S. Borovkov	Deputy Chairman of the All-Russia Lifeguard Society	Independent
Konstantin Borovoi	Chairman of the Party of Economic Freedom	Party of Economic Freedom
Bashir Chakhiev	Head of the Archives Service of Ingushetia	Independent
Viktor Chechevatov	Commander of the Far Eastern Military District	Independent
Vasily Chernyshev	Publisher	Independent
Nikolay Dalsky	President of the "General Agreement" Foundation	Independent
Boris Fyodorov	Deputy of the State Duma (1994–1998), Deputy Prime Minister (1992–1994), Minister of Finance (1993–1994)	Forward, Russia!
Victor Fedosov		Union of Soviet Stalinists
Sergey Fomintsev	Publisher	Independent
Yegor Gaidar	Deputy of the State Duma, acting Prime Minister (1992), First Deputy Prime Minister (1993–1994), Minister of Finance (1991–1992) (declined nomination, endorsed Yeltsin)	Democratic Choice of Russia
Leonid Kazakov	Economist	Independent
Oleg Khabarov	Director of Interozon	Independent
Irina Khakamada	Deputy of the State Duma (1994–1997, 1998–2003)	Common Cause
Yan Koltunov	Rocket engineer	Federation of Peace and Accord
Vladislav Kuznetsov	Entrepreneur	Independent
Alexander Lobanov	Entrepreneur	Independent
Andrey Lychakov	Chairman of the Council, "Ozon" ecological center	Independent
Sergey Mavrodi	Founder of MMM, deputy of the State Duma (1994–1995)	Independent
Nikolay Maslov	Chairman of the Party of National Accord	Party of National Accord
Vladimir Miloserdov	Chairman of the Russian Party (withdrew, endorsed Zyuganov)	Russian Party
Vladimir Morozov	Director of Inyurkon	Independent
Vyacheslav Onegin	Entrepreneur	Independent
Alexey Popov	Scientist	Independent
Valery Popov	Scientist	Independent
Pyotr Romanov	Deputy of the State Duma (1996–2016) (withdrew, endorsed Zyuganov)	Assembly of National-Democratic and Patriotic Forces
Alexander Rutskoy	Vice President of Russia (1991–1993) (withdrew, endorsed Zyuganov)	Derzhava
Nikolay Ruzavin	Farmer	Independent
Marat Sabirov	President of the International League of Global Concepts	Independent
Alexander Sarychev	Entrepreneur	People's Patriotic Union
Victor Semyonov		Independent
Galina Sharova		Independent
Alexey Shevchenko		Independent
Anatoly Sidorov	Deputy of the State Duma (1994–1996), Director of the Institute of Economics and Entrepreneurship	Independent
Vyacheslav Silaev		Union of the Creative Forces of Russia
Sergey Skvortsov	Editor-in-chief of Narodnaya Gazeta	CPSU-2
Valery Smirnov	Chairman of the Executive Committee of the National Salvation Front	National Salvation Front
Mikhail Smirnov	Lawyer	Independent
Anatoly Stankov	Deputy of the Moscow City Duma (1993–1997)	Independent
Stepan Sulakshin	Deputy of the State Duma (1994–2000)	Independent
Stanislav Terekhov	Chairman of the Union of Officers	Indpependent
Vasily Terentyev	Entrepreneur	Anti-Communist People's Party
Sergey Tokhtabiyev	President of the International Fund for the Development of Small Peoples and Ethnic Groups	Independent
Alexander Vasilyev	Leader of Peace with God	Independent
Andrey Volkov (Kirillov)	Deputy of the State Duma (1994–1996)	Independent
Arkady Volsky	President of the Russian Union of Industrialists and Entrepreneurs	Independent
Vladimir Voronin	Retired	Movement for the National Revival of Russia
Andrei Zavidia	President of the Galand Group, 1991 LDPR vice-presidential candidate	Russian Republican Party
Sergey Zyryanov	President of ICP "Life"	Independent

Other declared candidates

- Stanislav Govorukhin, film director
- Aleksandr Ivanov-Sukharevsky, founder and leader of People's National Party
- Nikolai Lysenko, founder and leader of National Republican Party of Russia
- Vladimir Shumeyko, former chairman of the Federation Council

== Possible candidates who did not run ==
Candidates who refused nominations by political movements and initiative groups
Candidate	Positions	Party/movement
Boris Gromov	Deputy of State Duma; vice-presidential candidate in 1991	My Fatherland
Boris Nemtsov	Governor of Nizhny Novgorod Oblast	Independent
Valery Zorkin	Judge of the Constitutional Court of Russia	Independent

The following individuals were included in some polls, were referred to in the media as possible candidates or had publicly expressed interest long before the elections but never announced that they would run.

- Ramazan Abdulatipov, former Deputy Chairman of the Federation Council and Chairman of the Soviet of Nationalities; vice presidential candidate in 1991
- Viktor Anpilov, politician and trade unionist
- Sergey Baburin, Deputy of the State Duma
- Vadim Bakatin, former chairman of the KGB and Minister of Interior of the Soviet Union, 1991 presidential candidate
- Vladimir Bukovsky, activist (was urged to run)
- Viktor Chernomyrdin, Prime Minister of Russia
- Yegor Gaidar, former acting prime minister of Russia
- Pavel Grachev, Minister of Defence
- Boris Fyodorov, former Minister of Finance
- Ruslan Khasbulatov, former Chairman of the Supreme Soviet
- Sergei Kovalev, former Commissioner for human rights
- Andrei Kozyrev, former Minister of Foreign Affairs
- Yekaterina Lakhova, Deputy of the State Duma
- Yury Luzhkov, Mayor of Moscow
- Albert Makashov, Deputy of the State Duma
- Ella Pamfilova, Deputy of the State Duma, former Minister of Welfare
- Gavriil Kharitonovich Popov, former mayor of Moscow
- Nikolai Ryzhkov, Deputy of the State Duma, former chairman of the USSR Council of Ministers; presidential candidate in 1991
- Eduard Rossel, Governor of Sverdlovsk Oblast
- Ivan Rybkin, former Chairman of the State Duma
- Vladimir Shcherbakov, chairman of the board of directors of Avtotor
- Sergey Shakhray, co-author of the Constitution of the Russian Federation and former deputy prime minister
- Alexander Shokhin, former Minister of Labour, Minister of the Economy, Deputy Chairman of the Government
- Aleksandr Solzhenitsyn, author
- Yury Skokov, leader of Congress of Russian Communities; former First Deputy Prime Minister of Russia and Secretary of the Security Council
- Anatoly Sobchak, Mayor of Saint Petersburg
- Oleg Soskovets, First Deputy Prime Minister of Russia
- Nikolay Travkin, former Democratic Party leader
- Leonid Yakubovich, television personality
