= Opinion polling for the 1996 Russian presidential election =

Opinion polling for the Russian presidential election, 1996

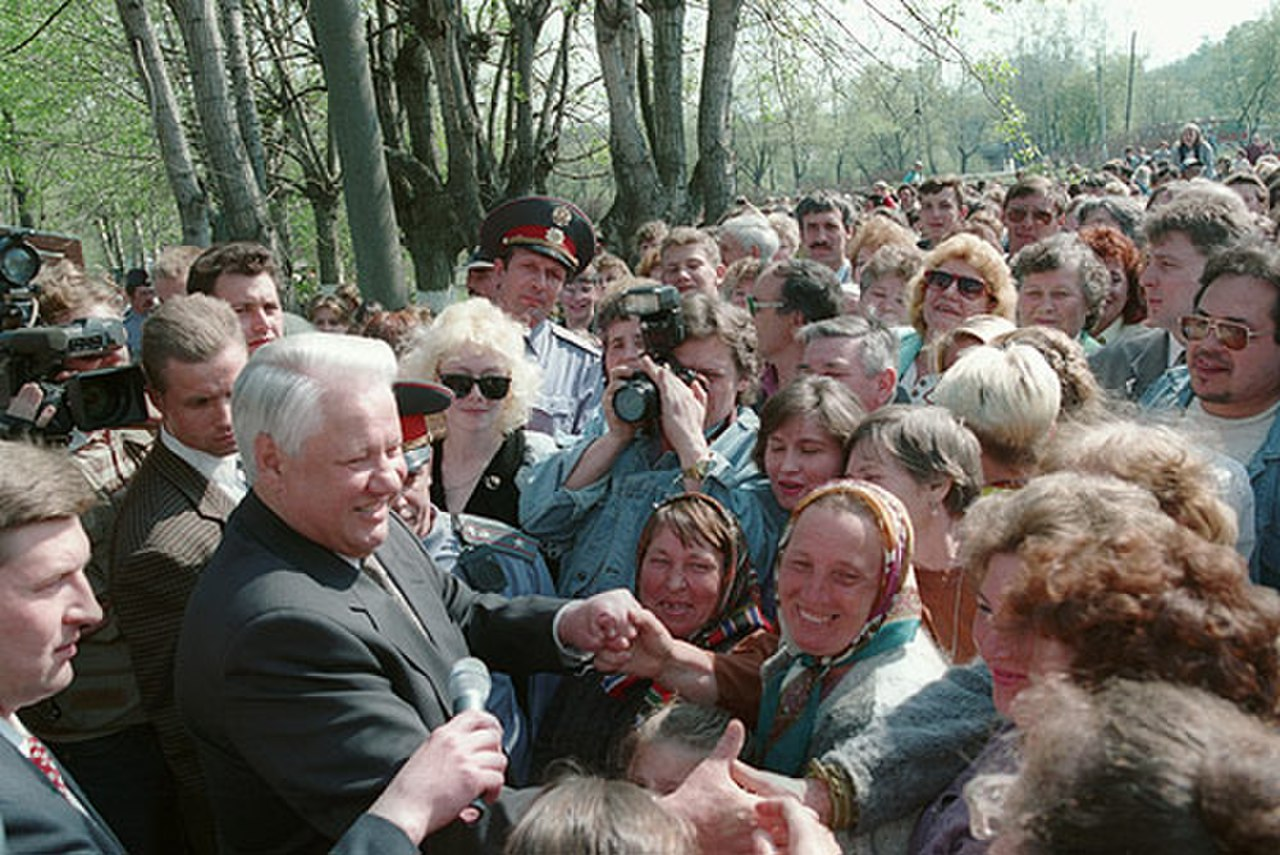
Yeltsin campaigning in the Moscow-region on May 7, 1996

This page lists public opinion polls in connection with the 1996 Russian presidential election.

== First round ==
Candidates passing the second round are given in bold.

=== 1992 to 1994 ===
View source data.
View source data.

Date	Agency	Zyuganov	Yeltsin	Yavlinsky	Zhirinovsky	S. Fyodorov	Gorbachev	Chernomyrdin	Tuleyev	Gaidar	Rutskoy	Shakhray	Travkin	Pamfilova	Sobchak	Volsky	Shumeyko	Rybkin	Other	Undecided	Wouldn't vote	Additional candidates
December 1992	PPRS	—N/a	**28**	—N/a	4	—N/a	—N/a	—N/a	11	—N/a	8	—N/a	—N/a	—N/a	—N/a	—N/a	—N/a	—N/a	—N/a	14	27	Makashov, Bakatin 4
1 January 1993	VCIOM	—N/a	**48**	3	2	—N/a	—N/a	1	—N/a	2	12	—N/a	—N/a	—N/a	1	1	—N/a	—N/a	4	18	4	Khasbulatov 1
mid-October 1993	FOM	—N/a	**27**	7	3	—N/a	—N/a	2	—N/a	6	—N/a	4	4	—N/a	—N/a	—N/a	—N/a	—N/a	16	19	12	—N/a
10–23 November 1993	VCIOM	—N/a	**22.7**	—N/a	4.1	2.6	1.2	1.5	3.6	2.8	5.0	3.7	2.7	—N/a	2.2	1.0	4.4	—N/a	24.8	4.3	0.7	Nemtsov 1.8, Borovoi 0.4, Skokov 0.2
late-March 1994	FOM	4	**13**	7	5	—N/a	—N/a	2	—N/a	5	5	2	2	1	—N/a	—N/a	—N/a	—N/a	15	20	17	—N/a
25 June 1994	VCIOM	1	**16**	10	5	1	1	2	1	4	5	2	1	1	2	1	1	1	7	15	24	Baburin 1, Luzhkov, Popov, Skokov 0
late-June 1994	FOM	2	**12**	**12**	6	—N/a	2	3	—N/a	4	8	2	3	1	2	—N/a	—N/a	1	5	14	21	Lebed 1
July 1994	Mnenie Poll Service	3.8	**11.3**	9.1	5.9	—N/a	—N/a	2.6	—N/a	4.0	6.9	—N/a	—N/a	—N/a	—N/a	—N/a	—N/a	—N/a	—N/a	37.7	18.5	—N/a
July 1994	Mnenie Poll Service	4.1	—N/a	**10.7**	5.7	—N/a	—N/a	3.8	—N/a	6.9	7.2	—N/a	—N/a	—N/a	—N/a	—N/a	—N/a	—N/a	—N/a	41.1	19.8	—N/a
August 1994	FOM	3	**12**	7	6	—N/a	3	1	—N/a	2	7	2	—N/a	3	2	—N/a	1	0	—N/a	11	15	Solzhenitsyn 5, Lebed 2, Luzhkov 1
6 September 1994	VCIOM	2	**19**	11	5	1	1	3	1	5	6	1	2	1	1	1	—N/a	1	1	—N/a	35	Khasbulatov 1, Baburin, Lakhova, Lebed, Skokov 0

=== 1995 polls ===
View source data.

Date	Agency	Zyuganov	Yeltsin	Lebed	Yavlinsky	Zhirinovsky	S. Fyodorov	Gorbachev	Chernomyrdin	Tuleyev	Gaidar	Rutskoy	Shakhray	Travkin	Pamfilova	Baburin	B. Fyodorov	Nemtsov	Sobchak	Volsky	Shumeyko	Rybkin	Solzhenitsyn	Luzhkov	Borovoi	Lakhova	Romanov	Lapshin	Skokov	Khasbulatov	Ryzhkov	Barkashov	Gromov	Govorukhin	Yakubovich	Rossel	Other	Undecided	Wouldn't vote	Additional candidates
10 January 1995	VCIOM	2	**9**	2	7	6	2	1	1	1	5	3	1	1	2	0	2	3	1	0	—N/a	1	2	1	—N/a	0	0	—N/a	0	0	—N/a	—N/a	—N/a	—N/a	—N/a	—N/a	3	—N/a	38	Kovalev 2, Dudayev, Shokhin 0
January 1995	FOM	4	3	5	**9**	6	—N/a	—N/a	3	—N/a	4	4	—N/a	—N/a	—N/a	—N/a	4	—N/a	—N/a	—N/a	2	2	5	—N/a	—N/a	—N/a	—N/a	—N/a	—N/a	—N/a	—N/a	—N/a	—N/a	—N/a	—N/a	—N/a	—N/a	24	21	Kovalev 4
20 February 1995	VCIOM	6	**9**	3	8	6	6	1	1	1	4	5	2	1	2	1	2	3	1	—N/a	—N/a	2	1	1	2	2	1	—N/a	0	0	—N/a	—N/a	—N/a	—N/a	—N/a	—N/a	3	—N/a	26	Abdulatipov, Kovalev 1, Dudayev, Shokhin 0
February 1995	FOM	5	3	4	**14**	6	—N/a	—N/a	2	—N/a	4	4	—N/a	—N/a	—N/a	—N/a	3	—N/a	—N/a	—N/a	1	1	5	—N/a	—N/a	—N/a	—N/a	—N/a	—N/a	—N/a	—N/a	—N/a	—N/a	—N/a	—N/a	—N/a	—N/a	24	22	Kovalev 2
February 1995	ROMIR	2.2	**5.8**	<1	4.1	4.9	<1	—N/a	—N/a	—N/a	1.2	2.1	—N/a	—N/a	—N/a	—N/a	<1	—N/a	—N/a	—N/a	—N/a	—N/a	—N/a	<1	—N/a	—N/a	—N/a	—N/a	—N/a	—N/a	—N/a	—N/a	—N/a	—N/a	—N/a	—N/a	—N/a	—N/a	—N/a	—N/a
30 March 1995	VCIOM	5	8	3	**10**	6	8	1	1	1	4	5	2	1	1	0	7	4	1	1	—N/a	1	—N/a	1	—N/a	1	—N/a	1	0	0	—N/a	—N/a	—N/a	—N/a	—N/a	—N/a	2	—N/a	22	—N/a
30 March 1995	VCIOM	5	7	—N/a	**10**	5	9	1	2	2	5	5	3	2	2	0	6	7	2	—N/a	—N/a	2	—N/a	2	—N/a	—N/a	—N/a	—N/a	0	—N/a	2	—N/a	2	—N/a	—N/a	—N/a	—N/a	—N/a	18	—N/a
April 1995	FOM	6	3	—N/a	**8**	6	6	1	1	—N/a	3	6	1	—N/a	—N/a	—N/a	5	—N/a	—N/a	—N/a	1	1	—N/a	2	—N/a	—N/a	0	—N/a	0	—N/a	—N/a	—N/a	—N/a	—N/a	—N/a	—N/a	2	28	16	Soskovets 0
20 April 1995	VCIOM	5	8	3	**11**	6	8	2	5	2	5	4	2	1	1	0	3	3	1	0	—N/a	1	2	1	—N/a	1	—N/a	1	0	—N/a	—N/a	1	—N/a	—N/a	—N/a	—N/a	6	—N/a	19	—N/a
10 May 1995	VCIOM	5	4	**10**	9	5	8	2	5	1	5	4	1	1	2	0	3	3	1	—N/a	—N/a	0	2	1	—N/a	1	—N/a	0	0	—N/a	1	1	4	—N/a	—N/a	—N/a	—N/a	—N/a	20	Kozyrev 0
25 May 1995	Obshchaya Gazeta	9	4	7	**12**	7	10	2	3	—N/a	5	8	4	—N/a	—N/a	—N/a	9	—N/a	—N/a	—N/a	—N/a	1	—N/a	3	—N/a	—N/a	2	—N/a	1	—N/a	—N/a	—N/a	—N/a	—N/a	—N/a	—N/a	—N/a	—N/a	—N/a	Soskovets; 1
20 June 1995	VCIOM	7	6	8	**11**	8	5	1	8	0	3	6	1	1	1	0	3	3	1	—N/a	—N/a	1	1	0	1	1	—N/a	0	0	0	0	1	1	1	1	1	—N/a	—N/a	20	—N/a
7 July 1995	VCIOM	4.2	5.6	2.3	**8.1**	6.3	5.5	—N/a	—N/a	—N/a	3.7	3.5	—N/a	—N/a	—N/a	—N/a	—N/a	2.7	2.3	—N/a	—N/a	—N/a	—N/a	—N/a	—N/a	—N/a	—N/a	—N/a	—N/a	—N/a	—N/a	—N/a	17.2	—N/a	—N/a	—N/a	—N/a	—N/a	—N/a	—N/a
7 July 1995	CESSI	6	7	**14**	12	6	—N/a	—N/a	10	—N/a	3	5	2	—N/a	—N/a	—N/a	—N/a	—N/a	—N/a	1	1	5	—N/a	—N/a	—N/a	—N/a	—N/a	—N/a	—N/a	—N/a	—N/a	—N/a	—N/a	—N/a	—N/a	—N/a	—N/a	23	—N/a	Kozyrev, Starovoytova 2, Chubais 1, Grachev 0
12 July 1995	VCIOM	3.9	2.6	**7.9**	6.0	4.6	5.5	—N/a	3.4	—N/a	—N/a	—N/a	3.5	2.6	—N/a	—N/a	3.5	2.2	—N/a	—N/a	—N/a	—N/a	—N/a	—N/a	—N/a	—N/a	—N/a	—N/a	—N/a	—N/a	—N/a	—N/a	—N/a	—N/a	—N/a	—N/a	14.4	—N/a	—N/a	—N/a
30 July 1995	VCIOM	**8**	7	7	**8**	7	5	1	7	2	3	4	1	0	1	2	1	3	0	0	1	1	2	1	1	1	—N/a	0	—N/a	—N/a	1	1	1	1	1	—N/a	1	22	—N/a	—N/a
10 October 1995	VCIOM	**11**	6	8	8	5	5	1	8	3	3	3	1	1	1	0	1	3	1	0	0	1	1	1	1	1	—N/a	1	1	—N/a	2	1	1	1	1	1	2	—N/a	18	Khakamada 1, Anpilov, Grachev 0
11 October 1995	IFES	6	7	**14**	12	5	—N/a	—N/a	10	—N/a	—N/a	—N/a	—N/a	—N/a	—N/a	—N/a	—N/a	—N/a	—N/a	—N/a	—N/a	—N/a	—N/a	—N/a	—N/a	—N/a	—N/a	—N/a	—N/a	—N/a	—N/a	—N/a	—N/a	—N/a	—N/a	—N/a	—N/a	—N/a	—N/a	—N/a
20 November 1995	VCIOM	**10**	3	6	8	7	5	1	5	3	2	3	1	0	1	0	3	2	0	0	—N/a	1	0	1	0	1	0	—N/a	0	—N/a	2	—N/a	—N/a	1	—N/a	1	2	25	5	Shcherbakov, Shokhin 0
10 December 1995	VCIOM	**15**	6	6	12	10	3	1	8	2	3	3	0	0	2	0	2	2	0	0	0	1	0	1	0	1	—N/a	0	0	—N/a	2	0	1	0	—N/a	0	2	—N/a	13	Abdulatipov, Anpilov, Grachev 0
21 December 1995	VCIOM	**6**	2	—N/a	—N/a	**6**	—N/a	—N/a	—N/a	—N/a	—N/a	—N/a	—N/a	—N/a	—N/a	—N/a	—N/a	—N/a	—N/a	—N/a	—N/a	—N/a	—N/a	—N/a	—N/a	—N/a	—N/a	—N/a	—N/a	—N/a	—N/a	—N/a	—N/a	—N/a	—N/a	—N/a	—N/a	48	—N/a	—N/a

=== 1996 polls ===
View source data.

==== January ====
View source data.

Date	Agency	Zyuganov	Yeltsin	Lebed	Yavlinsky	Zhiri- novsky	S. Fyodorov	Gorbachev	Cherno- myrdin	Tuleyev	Gaidar	Rutskoy	B. Fyodorov	Govorukhin	Other	Wouldn't vote	Additional candidates
14 January 1996	FOM	14.2	—N/a	**14.9**	13.6	—N/a	—N/a	—N/a	12.5	—N/a	—N/a	—N/a	—N/a	—N/a	—N/a	—N/a	—N/a
January 1996	VCIOM	**21**	8	10	11	11	—N/a	—N/a	—N/a	—N/a	—N/a	—N/a	—N/a	—N/a	—N/a	—N/a	—N/a
January 1996	IISS	**15**	6	8	11	9	7	—N/a	—N/a	—N/a	—N/a	—N/a	—N/a	—N/a	—N/a	—N/a	—N/a
28 January 1996	VCIOM	**20**	8	10	13	10	8	1	7	—N/a	3	—N/a	—N/a	—N/a	—N/a	—N/a	—N/a
29 January 1996	VCIOM	**11.3**	5.4	5.4	7.7	7.1	—N/a	—N/a	—N/a	—N/a	—N/a	—N/a	—N/a	—N/a	—N/a	—N/a	—N/a
30 January 1996	VCIOM	**18**	10	9	12	10	5	1	4	3	3	0	1	1	2	11	(Note: Baburin, Borovoi, Lakhova, Luzhkov, Ryzhkov, Travkin 1%, Dudayev, Kovalev, Nemtsov, Pamfilova, Romanov, Rossel, Rybkin, Skokov, Solzhenitsyn, Sobchak, Volsky 0%.)
10-31 January 1996	VCIOM	**12**	11	6	7	7	—N/a	1	4	—N/a	—N/a	3	2	1	44	—N/a	—N/a

==== February ====
View source data.

Date	Agency	Zyuganov	Yeltsin	Lebed	Yavlinsky	Zhiri- novsky	S. Fyodorov	Gorbachev	Cherno- myrdin	Tuleyev	Gaidar	Rutskoy	B. Fyodorov	Other	Against All	Undecided	Wouldn't vote	Additional candidates
2 February 1996	New York Times	14	5	6	11	7	—N/a	—N/a	—N/a	—N/a	—N/a	—N/a	—N/a	—N/a	—N/a	—N/a	—N/a	—N/a
15 February 1996	RIISNP	16.4	10.0	10.4	12.9	8.8	1.1	1.2	—N/a	—N/a	—N/a	—N/a	—N/a	—N/a	—N/a	—N/a	—N/a	—N/a
15 February 1996	VCIOM	21	11	8	12	12	8	1	7	—N/a	4	3	—N/a	—N/a	5	—N/a	9	—N/a
15 February 1996	VCIOM	22	11	6	9	11	5	1	5	2	3	1	1	2	—N/a	13	—N/a	(Note: Nemtsov 3%, Govorukhin, Khakamada, Lakhova, Ryzhkov 1%, Anpilov, Baburin, Barkashov, Borovoi, Grachev, Luzhkov, Pamfilova, Rossel, Rybkin, Shakhray, Skokov, Sobchak, Solzhenitsyn, Travkin, Volsky 0%.)
February 1996	ISNP	16.4	10.0	—N/a	12.5	—N/a	—N/a	—N/a	—N/a	—N/a	—N/a	—N/a	—N/a	—N/a	—N/a	—N/a	—N/a	—N/a
February 1996	IISS	18	8	7	8	11	6	—N/a	—N/a	—N/a	—N/a	—N/a	—N/a	—N/a	—N/a	—N/a	—N/a	—N/a
Mid-February 1996	RIISNP	16.4	10.0	10.4	12.9	8.8	1.1	1.2	—N/a	—N/a	—N/a	—N/a	—N/a	—N/a	—N/a	—N/a	—N/a	—N/a
Mid-February 1996	VCIOM	24	11	8	9	12	7	0	5	4	—N/a	—N/a	—N/a	—N/a	—N/a	—N/a	—N/a	—N/a
18 February 1996	ROMIR	18	8	9	11	9	—N/a	—N/a	7	—N/a	—N/a	—N/a	—N/a	—N/a	—N/a	—N/a	—N/a	—N/a
25 February 1996	VCIOM	18.0	8.0	7.0	8.0	10.0	8.0	0.6	—N/a	—N/a	—N/a	—N/a	—N/a	—N/a	—N/a	—N/a	—N/a	—N/a
29 February 1996	VCIOM	18.0	11.9	6.0	9.0	12.0	5.9	—N/a	—N/a	—N/a	—N/a	—N/a	—N/a	—N/a	—N/a	—N/a	—N/a	—N/a

==== March ====
View source data.

Date	Agency	Zyuganov	Yeltsin	Lebed	Yavlinsky	Zhiri- novsky	S. Fyodorov	Gorbachev	Shakkum	Cherno- myrdin	Tuleyev	Gaidar	Other	Against All	Undecided	Wouldn't vote	Additional candidates
2 March 1996	FOM	20	14	7	11	8	6	—N/a	—N/a	—N/a	—N/a	—N/a	—N/a	—N/a	—N/a	—N/a	—N/a
March 1996	ISNP	25.8	17.0	—N/a	12.9	—N/a	—N/a	—N/a	—N/a	—N/a	—N/a	—N/a	—N/a	—N/a	—N/a	—N/a	—N/a
15 March 1996	VCIOM	24	17	7	10	8	4	1	—N/a	—N/a	—N/a	2	2	—N/a	—N/a	8	(Note: Nemtsov 2%, Borovoi, Rybkin, Solzhenitsyn 1%, Baburin, B. Fyodorov, Khakamada, Luzhkov, Pamfilova, Sobchak, Travkin, Volsky, Lakhova, Lapshin, Ryzhkov, Govorukhin, Rossel 0%.)
Mid-March 1996	RIISNP	25.8	17.0	7.8	13.2	8.1	7.6	1.2	—N/a	—N/a	—N/a	—N/a	—N/a	—N/a	—N/a	—N/a	—N/a
17 March 1996	VCIOM	25	15	8	11	9	7	1	1	4	2	3	—N/a	—N/a	—N/a	—N/a	—N/a
17 March 1996	ROMIR	25.8	17.0	—N/a	9.0	7.0	—N/a	—N/a	—N/a	—N/a	—N/a	—N/a	—N/a	—N/a	—N/a	—N/a	—N/a
10–18 March 1996	CESSI	19.1	14.0	3.2	6.2	4.9	2.0	—N/a	—N/a	—N/a	—N/a	—N/a	—N/a	—N/a	—N/a	—N/a	—N/a
late-March 1996	ROMIR	27	19	—N/a	—N/a	9	—N/a	—N/a	—N/a	—N/a	—N/a	—N/a	—N/a	—N/a	—N/a	—N/a	—N/a
late-March 1996	VCIOM	20	14	7	11	8	—N/a	—N/a	—N/a	—N/a	—N/a	—N/a	—N/a	—N/a	—N/a	—N/a	—N/a
30 March 1996	VCIOM	23	18	8	12	7	7	1	—N/a	5	—N/a	3	2	3	—N/a	11	—N/a
31 March 1996	VCIOM	27	19	—N/a	—N/a	—N/a	—N/a	—N/a	—N/a	—N/a	—N/a	—N/a	—N/a	—N/a	—N/a	—N/a	—N/a
31 March 1996	ROMIR	26	17	—N/a	9	7	—N/a	—N/a	—N/a	—N/a	—N/a	—N/a	—N/a	—N/a	—N/a	—N/a	—N/a
31 March 1996	FOM	21	19	8	8	7	5	—N/a	—N/a	—N/a	—N/a	—N/a	10	2	14	6	—N/a
End of March 1996	VCIOM	25	18	10	9	9	7	—N/a	—N/a	4	—N/a	3	—N/a	—N/a	—N/a	—N/a	—N/a

==== April ====
View source data.

Date	Agency	Zyuganov	Yeltsin	Lebed	Yavlinsky	Zhiri- novsky	S. Fyodorov	Gorbachev	Bryntsalov	Vlasov	Cherno- myrdin	Tuleyev	Gaidar	Other	Against all	Undecided	Wouldn't vote	Additional candidates
4 April 1996	VCIOM	26	**28**	7	11	6	6	1	1	0	—N/a	2	—N/a	1	3	—N/a	7	(Note: Starovoytova, Tarasov 1%, Mavrodi, Podoprigora, Ushakov 0%.)
7 April 1996	FOM	**25**	21	6	9	6	3	—N/a	—N/a	—N/a	—N/a	—N/a	9	1	9	4	18	—N/a
10 April 1996	VCIOM	**26**	18	10	10	8	8	1	—N/a	—N/a	4	—N/a	3	—N/a	—N/a	—N/a	—N/a	—N/a
13 April 1996	FOM	22	**23**	6	8	8	5	—N/a	—N/a	—N/a	—N/a	—N/a	—N/a	—N/a	5	1	18	—N/a
14 April 1996	ROMIR	**27.0**	22.0	8.0	7.0	6.0	6.0	—N/a	—N/a	—N/a	7	—N/a	—N/a	—N/a	—N/a	—N/a	—N/a	—N/a
April 1996	IISS	**25**	21	6	9	6	3	—N/a	—N/a	—N/a	—N/a	—N/a	—N/a	—N/a	—N/a	—N/a	—N/a	—N/a
10–15 April	ISP	**38–47**	16–20	8–10	8–9	6–7	2–4	1–2	—N/a	—N/a	—N/a	—N/a	—N/a	—N/a	—N/a	—N/a	—N/a	—N/a
15 April 1996	VCIOM	**25**	21	6	10	6	4	1	—N/a	—N/a	2	2	1	1	—N/a	—N/a	12	(Note: Lakhova, Rutskoy 1%, Abdulatipov, Anpilov, Baburin, Nemtsov, Barkashov, B. Fyodorov, Govorukhin, Gromov, Khakamada, Lapshin, Luzhkov, Pamfilova, Rybkin, Ryzhkov, Shakray, Shcherbakov, Sobchak, Solzhenitsyn, Travkin, Volsky 0%.)
Mid-April 1996	RIISNP	**28.0**	23.8	10.3	12.7	8.5	6.7	1.1	—N/a	—N/a	—N/a	—N/a	—N/a	—N/a	—N/a	—N/a	—N/a	—N/a
17 April 1996	VCIOM	**26.0**	18.0	10.0	10.0	8.0	—N/a	—N/a	—N/a	—N/a	—N/a	—N/a	—N/a	—N/a	—N/a	—N/a	—N/a	—N/a
20 April 1996	FOM	**22**	**22**	6	8	7	5	—N/a	—N/a	—N/a	—N/a	—N/a	—N/a	3	3	5	18	—N/a
22 April 1996	CESSI	19.8	**20.7**	4.7	6.5	4.8	3.2	1.0	—N/a	—N/a	—N/a	—N/a	—N/a	—N/a	—N/a	—N/a	—N/a	—N/a
24 April 1996	VCIOM	**27.0**	21.0	8.0	11.0	9.0	4.0	2.0	—N/a	—N/a	—N/a	—N/a	—N/a	—N/a	—N/a	—N/a	—N/a	—N/a
24 April 1996	CESSI	19.8	**20.8**	5.0	7.0	5.0	3.0	—N/a	—N/a	—N/a	—N/a	—N/a	—N/a	—N/a	—N/a	—N/a	—N/a	—N/a

==== May ====
View source data.

Date	Agency	Zyuganov	Yeltsin	Lebed	Yavlinsky	Zhiri- novsky	S. Fyodorov	Gorbachev	Bryntsalov	Vlasov	Shakkum	Staro- voytova	Ushakov	Tuleyev	Podo- prigora	Other	Against all	Undecided	Additional candidates
27 April-2 May	ISP	**43–45**	25	8	8	7	3	1–2	—N/a	—N/a	—N/a	—N/a	—N/a	—N/a	—N/a	—N/a	—N/a	—N/a	—N/a
5 May 1996	VCIOM	27.0	**28.0**	6.0	9.0	7.0	7.0	1.0	—N/a	—N/a	—N/a	—N/a	—N/a	2.0	—N/a	—N/a	—N/a	—N/a	—N/a
5 May 1996	ROMIR	**28.0**	**28.0**	7.0	7.0	5.0	6.0	2.0	—N/a	—N/a	—N/a	—N/a	—N/a	—N/a	—N/a	—N/a	—N/a	15	—N/a
5 May 1996	ROMIR	25	**29.0**	6.0	8.0	6.0	4.0	1.0	—N/a	—N/a	—N/a	—N/a	—N/a	1.0	—N/a	—N/a	—N/a	—N/a	—N/a
11–12 May 1996	FOM	28	**32**	14	18	—N/a	10	—N/a	—N/a	—N/a	—N/a	—N/a	—N/a	1.0	—N/a	—N/a	—N/a	—N/a	—N/a
12 May 1996	ROMIR	25	**32**	5.0	9.0	5.0	3.0	1.0	—N/a	—N/a	—N/a	—N/a	—N/a	1.0	—N/a	—N/a	—N/a	—N/a	—N/a
9–14 May 1996	CESSI	19.3	**27.7**	5.5	9.2	4.3	3.2	—N/a	—N/a	—N/a	—N/a	—N/a	—N/a	—N/a	—N/a	—N/a	—N/a	—N/a	—N/a
14 May 1996		27	**28**	—N/a	—N/a	—N/a	—N/a	—N/a	—N/a	—N/a	—N/a	—N/a	—N/a	—N/a	—N/a	—N/a	—N/a	—N/a	—N/a
May 1996	RIISNP	22.4	**35.2**	7.4	13.3	6.1	5.6	1.0	0.2	0.6	0.9	—N/a	—N/a	3.1	—N/a	—N/a	—N/a	—N/a	—N/a
15 May 1996	VCIOM	22	**36**	7	10	6	5	1	0	0	1	—N/a	—N/a	—N/a	—N/a	2	0	3	—N/a
17 May 1996	ISP	**42**	27.0	8.0	10.0	7.0	3.0	—N/a	—N/a	—N/a	—N/a	—N/a	—N/a	—N/a	—N/a	—N/a	—N/a	—N/a	—N/a
19 May 1996	VCIOM	26.0	**33.0**	7.0	9.0	7.0	4.0	0.5	—N/a	0.4	0.5	—N/a	—N/a	1.0	—N/a	—N/a	—N/a	—N/a	—N/a
19 May 1996	ROMIR	27.0	**31.0**	4.0	7.0	5.0	5.0	1.0	0.0	0.0	0.0	—N/a	—N/a	1.0	—N/a	—N/a	—N/a	—N/a	—N/a
6–24 May 1996	VCIOM	13.9	**23.5**	3.3	6.0	3.2	2.2	0.4	0.2	0.0	0.1	0.1	0.2	0.5	0.0	0.5	—N/a	43.7	(Note: Ubozhko 0.8, Nobody 0.5, N/A 0.8.)
6–24 May 1996	VCIOM	19.4	**29.5**	7.2	12.5	5.0	6.1	0.8	0.2	—N/a	0.2	0.9	0.1	1.4	0.1	11.4	—N/a	—N/a	(Note: Tarasov 0.3, Mavrodi 0.1, N/A 4.5.)
26 May 1996	ROMIR	24.0	**35.0**	6.0	6.0	5.0	3.0	1.0	0.0	0.0	0.0	—N/a	—N/a	1.0	—N/a	—N/a	—N/a	—N/a	—N/a
24–28 May 1996	ISP	**36**	**36**	7–8	10	5–7	4	—N/a	—N/a	—N/a	—N/a	—N/a	—N/a	—N/a	—N/a	—N/a	—N/a	—N/a	—N/a
30 May 1996	CESSI	19.7	**32.6**	5.6	5.9	5.7	—N/a	—N/a	—N/a	—N/a	—N/a	—N/a	—N/a	—N/a	—N/a	—N/a	—N/a	—N/a	—N/a
31 May 1996	FOM	22	**34**	—N/a	—N/a	—N/a	—N/a	—N/a	—N/a	—N/a	—N/a	—N/a	—N/a	—N/a	—N/a	—N/a	—N/a	—N/a	—N/a

==== June ====
View source data.

Date	Agency	Zyuganov	Yeltsin	Lebed	Yavlinsky	Zhiri- novsky	S. Fyodorov	Gorbachev	Bryntsalov	Vlasov	Shakkum	Tuleyev	Against all	Wouldn't vote
3 June 1996	VCIOM	26.0	**37.0**	7.0	7.0	6.0	3.0	1.0	0.4	—N/a	—N/a	—N/a	—N/a	—N/a
3 June 1996	ROMIR	23	**35**	7	7	4	2	0	0	0	0	1	—N/a	—N/a
7 June 1996	ISP	31	**40**	9	11	5	2	—N/a	—N/a	—N/a	—N/a	—N/a	—N/a	—N/a
9 June 1996	FOM	30	**34**	7	6	8	2	—N/a	—N/a	—N/a	—N/a	—N/a	2	—N/a
8–10 June 1996	ROMIR	23	**34**	7	7	5	2	1	0	0	0	1	—N/a	—N/a
10 June 1996	VCIOM	24	**39**	7	9	5	3	1	1	0	0	0	2	10
5–11 June 1996	VCIOM	24.0	**36.0**	10.0	8.0	6.0	3.0	0.5	0.4	0.3	0.1	1.0	—N/a	—N/a
13 June 1996	Sovetskaya Rossiya	**36**	27	—N/a	—N/a	—N/a	—N/a	—N/a	—N/a	—N/a	—N/a	—N/a	—N/a	—N/a
13 June 1996	ISP	31	**40**	—N/a	—N/a	—N/a	—N/a	—N/a	—N/a	—N/a	—N/a	—N/a	—N/a	—N/a
13 June 1996	Betanelli	**35.6**	32.7	11.0	9.8	7.5	9.8	—N/a	—N/a	—N/a	—N/a	—N/a	—N/a	—N/a
June 1996	VCIOM	19	**33**	8	10	6	3	1	3	1	—N/a	2	11	
June 1996	VCIOM	22	**39**	9	10	5	4	0	1	0	0	2	2	5
16 June 1996	Election result	32.5	**35.8**	14.7	7.4	5.8	0.9	0.5	0.2	0.2	0.4	0.0	1.6	—N/a

===== Exit polls =====
Agency	Zyuganov	Yeltsin	Lebed	Yavlinsky	Zhiri- novsky	S. Fyodorov	Gorbachev	Bryntsalov	Vlasov	Shakkum	Tuleyev	Against all
CESSI	29	**35**	14	10	7	—N/a	—N/a	—N/a	—N/a	—N/a	—N/a	—N/a
Election result	32.5	**35.8**	14.7	7.4	5.8	0.9	0.5	0.2	0.2	0.4	0.0	1.6

== Second round ==
View source data.

=== Polls before runoff ===
Date	Agency	Zyuganov	Yeltsin	Against all	Not vote	Undecided
20 February 1995	VCIOM	19	23	—N/a	58	—N/a
January 1996	VCIOM	41	21	—N/a	—N/a	—N/a
January 1996	VCIOM	33	19	20	15	13
28 January 1996	VCIOM	33	18	22	15	12
30 January 1996	VCIOM	36	25	32	7	—N/a
13 February 1996	VCIOM	33	19	20	15	13
February 1996	RIISNP	32.3	25.2	36.3	—N/a	—N/a
February 1996	VCIOM	34	21	22	15	13
15 February 1996	VCIOM	36	26	24	14	—N/a
Mid-February 1996	VCIOM	39	27	22	4	8
March 1996	VCIOM	37	29	—N/a	—N/a	—N/a
mid-March	VCIOM	32	24	17	12	12
17 March 1996	VCIOM	36	33	18	3	10
17 March 1996	ROMIR	40	31	—N/a	—N/a	—N/a
12–24 March 1996	IISES	32	24	36	—N/a	—N/a
late-March	VCIOM	30	29	21	12	10
late-March	ROMIR	40	30	—N/a	—N/a	—N/a
31 March 1996	VCIOM	32	24	21	12	11
10 April 1996	VCIOM	29	28	18	15	10
13 April 1996	FOM	17	22	—N/a	—N/a	—N/a
14 April 1996	ROMIR	40	34	—N/a	—N/a	—N/a
April 1996	RIISNP	36.5	31.7	20.8	—N/a	—N/a
17 April 1996	VCIOM	29	28	17	12	12
20 April 1996	ROMIR	40	36	—N/a	—N/a	—N/a
28 April 1996	ROMIR	40	36	—N/a	—N/a	—N/a
5 May 1996	ROMIR	33	41	—N/a	—N/a	—N/a
5 May 1996		36	40	—N/a	—N/a	—N/a
6 May 1996	VCIOM	29	31	17	9	14
12 May 1996	VCIOM	31	37	15	9	8
12 May 1996	ROMIR	32	42	—N/a	—N/a	—N/a
14 May 1996		37	45	—N/a	—N/a	—N/a
May 1996	ISP	42	27	—N/a	—N/a	—N/a
May 1996	IISS	36-47	16-20	—N/a	—N/a	—N/a
17 May 1996	CESSI	27	43.1	—N/a	—N/a	11.5
19 May 1996	VCIOM	37	50	13	—N/a	—N/a
19 May 1996	ROMIR	32	43	—N/a	—N/a	—N/a
6-24 May 1996	VCIOM	35.2	48.3	—N/a	16.5	—N/a
26 May 1996	VCIOM	36	52	12	—N/a	—N/a
26 May 1996	ROMIR	30	46	—N/a	—N/a	—N/a
30 May 1996	CESSI	27.6	47.9	—N/a	—N/a	9.5
3 June 1996	ROMIR	31	49	—N/a	—N/a	—N/a
12 June 1996	VCIOM	36	53	11	—N/a	—N/a
12 June 1996	ROMIR	30	46	—N/a	—N/a	—N/a

=== Polls during runoff ===
Date	Agency	Zyuganov	Yeltsin	Against all
16 June 1996	CNN/Moscow Times	24.8	50.0	—N/a
1 July 1996	Betanelli	38.5	56.0	5.0
3 July 1996	Election result	40.7	54.4	4.9

==== Exit polls ====
Agency	Zyuganov	Yeltsin	Against all
CESSI	41	54	—N/a
Election result	40.7	54.4	4.9

=== Hypothetical polling ===
==== With Chernomyrdin ====
Date	Agency	Chernomyrdin	Lebed	Yavlinsky	Against all	Would not vote	Undecided
July 1995	FOM	22	—N/a	25	—N/a	33	20
September 1995	FOM	18	—N/a	28	—N/a	31	24
14 January 1996	FOM	34.6	65.4	—N/a	—N/a	—N/a	—N/a
14 January 1996	FOM	39.1	—N/a	60.9	—N/a	—N/a	—N/a

==== With B. Fyodorov ====
Date	Agency	B. Fyodorov	Lebed	Zhirinovsky	Against all	Would not vote	Undecided
20 February 1995	VCIOM	28	20	—N/a	28	24	—N/a
May 10, 1995	VCIOM	31	—N/a	9	40	20	—N/a

==== With S. Fyodorov ====
Date	Agency	S. Fyodorov	Gaidar	Yavlinsky	Against all	Would not vote	Undecided
20 February 1995	VCIOM	41	17	—N/a	—N/a	42	—N/a
20 April 1995	VCIOM	30	—N/a	31	19	19	—N/a

==== With Gaidar ====
Date	Agency	Gaidar	S. Fyodorov	Yavlinsky	Zhirinovsky	Zyuganov	Against all	Would not vote	Undecided
20 May 1994	VCIOM	38	—N/a	—N/a	14	—N/a	—N/a	48	—N/a
June 1994	FOM	11	—N/a	24	—N/a	—N/a	30	20	15
20 February 1995	VCIOM	17	41	—N/a	—N/a	—N/a	—N/a	42	—N/a
May 10, 1995	VCIOM	20.4	—N/a	29.6	—N/a	—N/a	—N/a	50	—N/a
10–23 November 1995	VCIOM	26	—N/a	—N/a	—N/a	20	38	17	—N/a

==== With Lebed ====
Graph of Lebed–Yavlinsky polls
View source data.

Graph of Lebed–Zyuganov polls
View source data.

Date	Agency	Lebed	Chernomyrdin	B. Fyodorov	Yavlinsky	Yeltsin	Zyuganov	Against all	Would not vote	Undecided
20 February 1995	VCIOM	20	—N/a	28	—N/a	—N/a	—N/a	—N/a	24	—N/a
July 1995	FOM	33	—N/a	—N/a	20	—N/a	—N/a	—N/a	21	26
September 1995	FOM	24	—N/a	—N/a	25	—N/a	—N/a	—N/a	26	25
10 January 1996	ROMIR	35	—N/a	—N/a	—N/a	—N/a	29	—N/a	—N/a	—N/a
14 January 1996	FOM	65.4	34.6	—N/a	—N/a	—N/a	—N/a	—N/a	—N/a	—N/a
14 January 1996	FOM	47.25	—N/a	—N/a	52.75	—N/a	—N/a	—N/a	—N/a	—N/a
14 January 1996	FOM	57.9	—N/a	—N/a	—N/a	—N/a	42.1	—N/a	—N/a	—N/a
28 January 1996	VCIOM	28	—N/a	—N/a	—N/a	—N/a	28	20	12	12
30 January 1996	VCIOM	32	—N/a	—N/a	39	—N/a	—N/a	33	21	6
30 January 1996	VCIOM	40	—N/a	—N/a	—N/a	22	—N/a	32	6	—N/a
30 January 1996	VCIOM	34	—N/a	—N/a	—N/a	—N/a	33	27	7	—N/a
13 February 1996	VCIOM	23	—N/a	—N/a	—N/a	—N/a	31	24	12	10
February 1996	RIISNP	24.9	—N/a	—N/a	—N/a	—N/a	29.3	38.7	—N/a	—N/a
12–24 March 1996	IISES	35	—N/a	—N/a	32	—N/a	—N/a	—N/a	—N/a	—N/a
12–24 March 1996	IISES	24	—N/a	—N/a	—N/a	28	—N/a	50	—N/a	—N/a
31 March 1996	VCIOM	23	—N/a	—N/a	—N/a	—N/a	30	24	12	11
10 April 1996	VCIOM	28	—N/a	—N/a	—N/a	—N/a	26	18	16	12
April 1996	RIISNP	24.8	—N/a	—N/a	—N/a	—N/a	35.4	27.1	—N/a	—N/a

Isolated table of Lebed–Zyuganov polls
Date	Agency	Lebed	Zyuganov	Against all	Would not vote	Undecided
10 January 1996	ROMIR	35	29	—N/a	—N/a	—N/a
14 January 1996	FOM	57.9	42.1	—N/a	—N/a	—N/a
28 January 1996	VCIOM	28	28	20	12	12
30 January 1996	VCIOM	34	33	27	7	—N/a
13 February 1996	VCIOM	23	31	24	12	10
February 1996	RIISNP	24.9	29.3	38.7	—N/a	—N/a
31 March 1996	VCIOM	23	30	24	12	11
10 April 1996	VCIOM	28	26	18	16	12
April 1996	RIISNP	24.8	35.4	27.1	—N/a	—N/a

==== With Nemtsov ====
Date	Agency	Nemtsov	Zhirinovsky	Against all	Would not vote	Undecided
May 10, 1995	VCIOM	31	10	42	17	—N/a

==== With Pamfilova ====
Date	Agency	Pamfilova	Yavlinsky	Against all	Would not vote	Undecided
20 February 1995	VCIOM	20	34	—N/a	46	—N/a

==== With Rutskoy ====
Date	Agency	Rutskoy	Yavlinsky	Yeltsin	Zhirinovsky	Against all	Would not vote	Undecided
10–23 November 1993	VCIOM	15.7	37.4	—N/a	—N/a	—N/a	46.9	—N/a
June 1994	FOM	19	—N/a	24	—N/a	30	18	9
20 February 1995	VCIOM	25	—N/a	—N/a	11	—N/a	64	—N/a

==== With Yavlinsky ====
Graph of Lebed–Yavlinsky polls
View source data.

Graph of Yavlinsky–Yeltsin polls
View source data.

Graph of Yavlinsky–Zyuganov polls
View source data.

Date	Agency	Yavlinsky	Cherno- myrdin	S. Fyodorov	Gaidar	Lebed	Pamfilova	Rutskoy	Yeltsin	Zyuganov	Against all	Would not vote	Undecided
10–23 November 1993	VCIOM	37.4	—N/a	—N/a	—N/a	—N/a	—N/a	15.7	—N/a	—N/a	—N/a	46.9	—N/a
April 1994	FOM	24	—N/a	—N/a	—N/a	—N/a	—N/a	—N/a	13	—N/a	27	21	15
June 1994	FOM	24	—N/a	—N/a	11	—N/a	—N/a	—N/a	—N/a	—N/a	30	20	15
20 February 1995	VCIOM	35	—N/a	—N/a	—N/a	—N/a	—N/a	—N/a	14	—N/a	—N/a	51	—N/a
20 February 1995	VCIOM	34	—N/a	—N/a	—N/a	—N/a	20	—N/a	—N/a	—N/a	—N/a	46	—N/a
20 February 1995	VCIOM	38	—N/a	—N/a	—N/a	—N/a	—N/a	—N/a	—N/a	17	—N/a	45	—N/a
20 April 1995	VCIOM	31	—N/a	30	—N/a	—N/a	—N/a	—N/a	—N/a	—N/a	19	19	—N/a
May 10, 1995	VCIOM	29.6	—N/a	—N/a	20.4	—N/a	—N/a	—N/a	—N/a	—N/a	—N/a	50	—N/a
July 1995	FOM	25	22	—N/a	—N/a	—N/a	—N/a	—N/a	—N/a	—N/a	—N/a	33	20
July 1995	FOM	20	—N/a	—N/a	—N/a	33	—N/a	—N/a	—N/a	—N/a	—N/a	21	26
September 1995	FOM	28	18	—N/a	—N/a	—N/a	—N/a	—N/a	—N/a	—N/a	—N/a	31	24
September 1995	FOM	25	—N/a	—N/a	—N/a	24	—N/a	—N/a	—N/a	—N/a	—N/a	26	25
22 September 1995	Moscow Kurranty	26	—N/a	—N/a	—N/a	—N/a	—N/a	—N/a	—N/a	18	21	18	17
14 January 1996	FOM	60.9	39.1	—N/a	—N/a	—N/a	—N/a	—N/a	—N/a	—N/a	—N/a	—N/a	—N/a
14 January 1996	FOM	52.75	—N/a	—N/a	—N/a	47.25	—N/a	—N/a	—N/a	—N/a	—N/a	—N/a	—N/a
14 January 1996	FOM	54.5	—N/a	—N/a	—N/a	—N/a	—N/a	—N/a	—N/a	42.5	—N/a	—N/a	—N/a
January 1996	VCIOM	36	—N/a	—N/a	—N/a	—N/a	—N/a	—N/a	—N/a	34	36	—N/a	—N/a
28 January 1996	VCIOM	33	—N/a	—N/a	—N/a	—N/a	—N/a	—N/a	—N/a	27	17	11	12
30 January 1996	VCIOM	39	—N/a	—N/a	—N/a	33	—N/a	—N/a	—N/a	—N/a	21	6	—N/a
30 January 1996	VCIOM	39	—N/a	—N/a	—N/a	—N/a	—N/a	—N/a	—N/a	32	24	6	—N/a
13 February 1996	VCIOM	34	—N/a	—N/a	—N/a	—N/a	—N/a	—N/a	—N/a	28	15	11	12
February 1996	RIISNP	35.2	—N/a	—N/a	—N/a	—N/a	—N/a	—N/a	20.1	—N/a	37.1	—N/a	—N/a
February 1996	RIISNP	34.2	—N/a	—N/a	—N/a	—N/a	—N/a	—N/a	—N/a	29.2	31.4	—N/a	—N/a
Mid-February 1996	VCIOM	33	—N/a	—N/a	—N/a	—N/a	—N/a	—N/a	—N/a	37	19	4	7
17 March 1996	VCIOM	32	—N/a	—N/a	—N/a	—N/a	—N/a	—N/a	—N/a	34	17	6	11
17 March 1996	ROMIR	29	—N/a	—N/a	—N/a	—N/a	—N/a	—N/a	—N/a	38	—N/a	—N/a	—N/a
12–24 March 1996	IISES	32	—N/a	—N/a	—N/a	35	—N/a	—N/a	—N/a	—N/a	—N/a	—N/a	—N/a
12–24 March 1996	IISES	35	—N/a	—N/a	—N/a	—N/a	—N/a	—N/a	20	—N/a	37	—N/a	—N/a
12–24 March 1996	IISES	34	—N/a	—N/a	—N/a	—N/a	—N/a	—N/a	—N/a	29	31	—N/a	—N/a
31 March 1996	VCIOM	31	—N/a	—N/a	—N/a	—N/a	—N/a	—N/a	—N/a	29	16	10	14
10 April 1996	VCIOM	31	—N/a	—N/a	—N/a	—N/a	—N/a	—N/a	—N/a	27	14	15	13
14 April 1996	ROMIR	28	—N/a	—N/a	—N/a	—N/a	—N/a	—N/a	—N/a	39	—N/a	—N/a	—N/a
14 April 1996	ROMIR	34	—N/a	—N/a	—N/a	—N/a	—N/a	—N/a	—N/a	31	—N/a	—N/a	—N/a
April 1996	RIISNP	28.0	—N/a	—N/a	—N/a	—N/a	—N/a	—N/a	26.8	—N/a	30.1	—N/a	—N/a
April 1996	RIISNP	31.0	—N/a	—N/a	—N/a	—N/a	—N/a	—N/a	—N/a	36.0	20.3	—N/a	—N/a
12 May 1996	VCIOM	41	—N/a	—N/a	—N/a	—N/a	—N/a	—N/a	—N/a	40	19	—N/a	—N/a
6-24 May 1996	VCIOM	23.1	—N/a	—N/a	—N/a	—N/a	—N/a	—N/a	55.1	—N/a	—N/a	21.8	—N/a
6-24 May 1996	VCIOM	38.7	—N/a	—N/a	—N/a	—N/a	—N/a	—N/a	—N/a	26.6	—N/a	34.7	—N/a

Isolated table of Yavlinsky–Yeltsin polls
Date	Agency	Yavlinsky	Yeltsin	Against all	Would not vote	Undecided
April 1994	FOM	24	13	27	21	15
20 February 1995	VCIOM	35	14	—N/a	51	—N/a
February 1996	RIISNP	35.2	20.1	37.1	—N/a	—N/a
12–24 March 1996	IISES	35	20	37	—N/a	—N/a
April 1996	RIISNP	28.0	26.8	30.1	—N/a	—N/a
6-24 May 1996	VCIOM	23.1	55.1	—N/a	21.8	—N/a

Isolated table of Yavlinsky–Zyuganov polls
Date	Agency	Yavlinsky	Zyuganov	Against all	Would not vote	Undecided
20 February 1995	VCIOM	38	17	—N/a	45	—N/a
September 22, 1995	Moscow Kurranty	26	18	21	18	17
January 1996	VCIOM	36	34	36	—N/a	—N/a
14 January 1996	FOM	54.5	42.5	—N/a	—N/a	—N/a
28 January 1996	VCIOM	33	27	17	11	12
30 January 1996	VCIOM	39	32	24	6	—N/a
13 February 1996	VCIOM	34	28	15	11	12
February 1996	RIISNP	34.2	29.2	31.4	—N/a	—N/a
Mid-February 1996	VCIOM	33	37	19	4	7
17 March 1996	VCIOM	32	34	17	6	11
17 March 1996	ROMIR	29	38	—N/a	—N/a	—N/a
12–24 March 1996	IISES	34	29	31	—N/a	—N/a
31 March 1996	VCIOM	31	29	16	10	14
10 April 1996	VCIOM	31	27	14	15	13
14 April 1996	ROMIR	28	39	—N/a	—N/a	—N/a
April 1996	RIISNP	31.0	36.0	20.3	—N/a	—N/a
12 May 1996	VCIOM	41	40	19	—N/a	—N/a
14 April 1996	ROMIR	34	31	—N/a	—N/a	—N/a
6-24 May 1996	VCIOM	38.7	26.6	—N/a	34.7	—N/a

==== With Yeltsin ====
Graph of Yavlinsky–Yeltsin polls
View source data.

Graph of Zhirinovsky–Yeltsin polls
View source data.

Date	Agency	Yeltsin	Lebed	Rutskoy	Yavlinsky	Zhirinovsky	Against all	Would not vote	Undecided
End of 1993	ROMIR	21	—N/a	—N/a	—N/a	16	—N/a	7	22
April 1994	FOM	13	—N/a	—N/a	24	—N/a	27	21	15
June 1994	FOM	24	—N/a	19	—N/a	—N/a	30	18	9
25 June 1994	VCIOM	42	—N/a	—N/a	—N/a	11	—N/a	36	12
20 February 1995	VCIOM	24	—N/a	—N/a	—N/a	11	—N/a	64	—N/a
30 January 1996	VCIOM	22	40	—N/a	—N/a	—N/a	—N/a	32	6
30 January 1996	VCIOM	29	—N/a	—N/a	—N/a	19	45	7	—N/a
February 1996	RIISNP	20.1	—N/a	—N/a	35.2	—N/a	37.1	—N/a	—N/a
20 February 1995	VCIOM	14	—N/a	—N/a	35	—N/a	—N/a	51	—N/a
12–24 March 1996	IISES	28	24	—N/a	—N/a	—N/a	50	—N/a	—N/a
12–24 March 1996	IISES	20	—N/a	—N/a	35	—N/a	37	—N/a	—N/a
12–24 March 1996	IISES	28.5	—N/a	—N/a	—N/a	14	39	—N/a	—N/a
April 1996	RIISNP	28.0	26.8	—N/a	—N/a	—N/a	30.1	—N/a	—N/a
6-24 May 1996	VCIOM	55.1	—N/a	—N/a	23.1	—N/a	—N/a	21.8	—N/a

Isolated table of Yavlinsky–Yeltsin polls
Date	Agency	Yavlinsky	Yeltsin	Against all	Would not vote	Undecided
April 1994	FOM	24	13	27	21	15
20 February 1995	VCIOM	35	14	—N/a	51	—N/a
February 1996	RIISNP	35.2	20.1	37.1	—N/a	—N/a
12–24 March 1996	IISES	35	20	37	—N/a	—N/a
April 1996	RIISNP	28.0	26.8	30.1	—N/a	—N/a
6-24 May 1996	VCIOM	23.1	55.1	—N/a	21.8	—N/a

Isolated table of Yeltsin–Zhirinovsky polls
Date	Agency	Yeltsin	Zhirinovsky	Against all	Would not vote	Undecided
End of 1993	ROMIR	21	16	—N/a	7	22
25 June 1994	VCIOM	42	11	—N/a	36	12
20 February 1995	VCIOM	24	11	—N/a	64	—N/a
30 January 1996	VCIOM	29	19	45	7	—N/a
12–24 March 1996	IISES	28.5	14	39	—N/a	—N/a

==== With Zhirinovsky ====
Graph of Zhirinovsky–Yeltsin polls
View source data.

Graph of Zhirinovsky–Zyuganov polls
View source data.

Date	Agency	Zhirinovsky	B. Fyodorov	Gaidar	Nemtsov	Rutskoy	Yeltsin	Zyuganov	Against all	Would not vote	Undecided
End of 1993	ROMIR	16	—N/a	—N/a	—N/a	—N/a	21	—N/a	—N/a	7	22
20 May 1994	VCIOM	14	—N/a	38	—N/a	—N/a	—N/a	—N/a	—N/a	48	—N/a
25 June 1994	VCIOM	11	—N/a	—N/a	—N/a	—N/a	42	—N/a	—N/a	36	12
20 February 1995	VCIOM	11	—N/a	—N/a	—N/a	25	—N/a	—N/a	—N/a	64	—N/a
20 February 1995	VCIOM	11	—N/a	—N/a	—N/a	—N/a	24	—N/a	—N/a	64	—N/a
May 10, 1995	VCIOM	9	31	—N/a	—N/a	—N/a	—N/a	—N/a	40	20	—N/a
May 10, 1995	VCIOM	31	—N/a	—N/a	10	—N/a	—N/a	—N/a	42	17	—N/a
28 January 1996	VCIOM	15	—N/a	—N/a	—N/a	—N/a	—N/a	35	26	14	10
30 January 1996	VCIOM	19	—N/a	—N/a	—N/a	—N/a	29	—N/a	45	7	—N/a
30 January 1996	VCIOM	18	—N/a	—N/a	—N/a	—N/a	—N/a	39	36	7	—N/a
13 February 1996	VCIOM	14	—N/a	—N/a	—N/a	—N/a	—N/a	35	26	14	11
February 1996	RIISNP	11.2	—N/a	—N/a	—N/a	—N/a	—N/a	33.6	47.1	—N/a	—N/a
28 February 1996	VCIOM	12	—N/a	—N/a	—N/a	—N/a	—N/a	39	38	11	—N/a
17 March 1996	VCIOM	13	—N/a	—N/a	—N/a	—N/a	—N/a	40	32	7	8
17 March 1996	ROMIR	13	—N/a	—N/a	—N/a	—N/a	—N/a	44	—N/a	—N/a	—N/a
12–24 March 1996	IISES	14	—N/a	—N/a	—N/a	—N/a	28.5	—N/a	39	—N/a	—N/a
12–24 March 1996	IISES	11	—N/a	—N/a	—N/a	—N/a	—N/a	34	47	—N/a	—N/a
31 March 1996	VCIOM	13	—N/a	—N/a	—N/a	—N/a	—N/a	35	32	12	8
10 April 1996	VCIOM	12	—N/a	—N/a	—N/a	—N/a	—N/a	33	30	18	7
April 1996	RIISNP	11.2	—N/a	—N/a	—N/a	—N/a	—N/a	37.2	41.2	—N/a	—N/a

Isolated table of Yeltsin–Zhirinovsky polls
Date	Agency	Yeltsin	Zhirinovsky	Against all	Would not vote	Undecided
End of 1993	ROMIR	21	16	—N/a	7	22
25 June 1994	VCIOM	42	11	—N/a	36	12
20 February 1995	VCIOM	24	11	—N/a	64	—N/a
30 January 1996	VCIOM	29	19	45	7	—N/a
12–24 March 1996	IISES	28.5	14	39	—N/a	—N/a

Isolated table of Zhirinovsky–Zyuganov polls
Date	Agency	Zhirinovsky	Zyuganov	Against all	Would not vote	Undecided
28 January 1996	VCIOM	15	35	26	14	10
30 January 1996	VCIOM	18	39	36	7	—N/a
13 February 1996	VCIOM	14	35	26	14	11
February 1996	RIISNP	11.2	33.6	47.1	—N/a	—N/a
28 February 1996	VCIOM	12	39	38	11	—N/a
17 March 1996	VCIOM	13	40	32	7	8
17 March 1996	ROMIR	13	44	—N/a	—N/a	—N/a
12–24 March 1996	IISES	11	34	47	—N/a	—N/a
31 March 1996	VCIOM	13	35	32	12	8
10 April 1996	VCIOM	12	33	30	18	7
April 1996	RIISNP	11.2	37.2	41.2	—N/a	—N/a

==== With Zyuganov ====
Graph of Lebed–Zyuganov polls
View source data.

Graph of Yavlinsky–Zyuganov polls
View source data.

Graph of Zhirinovksy–Zyuganov polls
View source data.

Date	Agency	Zyuganov	Gaidar	Lebed	Yavlinsky	Zhirinovsky	Against all	Would not vote	Undecided
20 February 1995	VCIOM	17	—N/a	—N/a	38	—N/a	—N/a	45	—N/a
September 22, 1995	Moscow Kurranty	18	—N/a	—N/a	26	—N/a	21	18	17
10–23 November 1995	VCIOM	20	26	—N/a	—N/a	—N/a	38	17	—N/a
January 1996	VCIOM	34	—N/a	—N/a	36	—N/a	36	—N/a	—N/a
10 January 1996	ROMIR	29	—N/a	35	—N/a	—N/a	—N/a	—N/a	—N/a
14 January 1996	FOM	42.1	—N/a	57.9	—N/a	—N/a	—N/a	—N/a	—N/a
14 January 1996	FOM	42.5	—N/a	—N/a	54.5	—N/a	—N/a	—N/a	—N/a
28 January 1996	VCIOM	28	—N/a	28	—N/a	—N/a	20	12	12
28 January 1996	VCIOM	27	—N/a	—N/a	33	—N/a	17	11	12
28 January 1996	VCIOM	35	—N/a	—N/a	—N/a	15	26	14	10
30 January 1996	VCIOM	33	—N/a	34	—N/a	—N/a	27	7	—N/a
30 January 1996	VCIOM	32	—N/a	—N/a	39	—N/a	24	6	—N/a
30 January 1996	VCIOM	39	—N/a	—N/a	—N/a	18	36	7	—N/a
13 February 1996	VCIOM	31	—N/a	23	—N/a	—N/a	24	12	10
13 February 1996	VCIOM	28	—N/a	—N/a	34	—N/a	15	11	12
13 February 1996	VCIOM	35	—N/a	—N/a	—N/a	14	26	14	11
February 1996	RIISNP	29.3	—N/a	24.9	—N/a	—N/a	38.7	—N/a	—N/a
February 1996	RIISNP	29.2	—N/a	—N/a	34.2	—N/a	31.4	—N/a	—N/a
February 1996	RIISNP	33.6	—N/a	—N/a	—N/a	11.2	47.1	—N/a	—N/a
Mid-February 1996	VCIOM	37	—N/a	—N/a	33	—N/a	19	4	7
28 February 1996	VCIOM	39	—N/a	—N/a	—N/a	12	38	11	—N/a
17 March 1996	VCIOM	34	—N/a	—N/a	32	—N/a	17	6	11
17 March 1996	VCIOM	40	—N/a	—N/a	—N/a	13	32	7	8
17 March 1996	ROMIR	38	—N/a	—N/a	29	—N/a	—N/a	—N/a	—N/a
17 March 1996	ROMIR	44	—N/a	—N/a	—N/a	13	—N/a	—N/a	—N/a
12–24 March 1996	IISES	29	—N/a	—N/a	34	—N/a	31	—N/a	—N/a
12–24 March 1996	IISES	34	—N/a	—N/a	—N/a	11	47	—N/a	—N/a
31 March 1996	VCIOM	30	—N/a	23	—N/a	—N/a	24	12	11
31 March 1996	VCIOM	31	—N/a	—N/a	31	—N/a	16	10	14
31 March 1996	VCIOM	35	—N/a	—N/a	—N/a	13	32	12	8
10 April 1996	VCIOM	26	—N/a	28	—N/a	—N/a	18	16	12
10 April 1996	VCIOM	27	—N/a	—N/a	31	—N/a	14	15	13
10 April 1996	VCIOM	33	—N/a	—N/a	—N/a	12	30	18	7
14 April 1996	ROMIR	39	—N/a	—N/a	28	—N/a	—N/a	—N/a	—N/a
14 April 1996	ROMIR	31	—N/a	—N/a	34	—N/a	—N/a	—N/a	—N/a
April 1996	RIISNP	35.4	—N/a	24.8	—N/a	—N/a	27.1	—N/a	—N/a
April 1996	RIISNP	36.0	—N/a	—N/a	31.0	—N/a	20.3	—N/a	—N/a
April 1996	RIISNP	37.2	—N/a	—N/a	—N/a	11.2	41.2	—N/a	—N/a
12 May 1996	VCIOM	40	—N/a	—N/a	41	—N/a	19	—N/a	—N/a
6-24 May 1996	VCIOM	26.6	—N/a	—N/a	38.7	—N/a	—N/a	34.7	—N/a

Isolated table of Lebed–Zyuganov polls
Date	Agency	Lebed	Zyuganov	Against all	Would not vote	Undecided
10 January 1996	ROMIR	35	29	—N/a	—N/a	—N/a
14 January 1996	FOM	57.9	42.1	—N/a	—N/a	—N/a
28 January 1996	VCIOM	28	28	20	12	12
30 January 1996	VCIOM	34	33	27	7	—N/a
13 February 1996	VCIOM	23	31	24	12	10
February 1996	RIISNP	24.9	29.3	38.7	—N/a	—N/a
31 March 1996	VCIOM	23	30	24	12	11
10 April 1996	VCIOM	28	26	18	16	12
April 1996	RIISNP	24.8	35.4	27.1	—N/a	—N/a

Isolated table of Yavlinsky–Zyuganov polls
Date	Agency	Yavlinsky	Zyuganov	Against all	Would not vote	Undecided
20 February 1995	VCIOM	38	17	—N/a	45	—N/a
September 22, 1995	Moscow Kurranty	26	18	21	18	17
January 1996	VCIOM	36	34	36	—N/a	—N/a
14 January 1996	FOM	54.5	42.5	—N/a	—N/a	—N/a
28 January 1996	VCIOM	33	27	17	11	12
30 January 1996	VCIOM	39	32	24	6	—N/a
13 February 1996	VCIOM	34	28	15	11	12
February 1996	RIISNP	34.2	29.2	31.4	—N/a	—N/a
Mid-February 1996	VCIOM	33	37	19	4	7
17 March 1996	VCIOM	32	34	17	6	11
17 March 1996	ROMIR	29	38	—N/a	—N/a	—N/a
12–24 March 1996	IISES	34	29	31	—N/a	—N/a
31 March 1996	VCIOM	31	29	16	10	14
10 April 1996	VCIOM	31	27	14	15	13
14 April 1996	ROMIR	28	39	—N/a	—N/a	—N/a
April 1996	RIISNP	31.0	36.0	20.3	—N/a	—N/a
12 May 1996	VCIOM	41	40	19	—N/a	—N/a
14 April 1996	ROMIR	34	31	—N/a	—N/a	—N/a
6-24 May 1996	VCIOM	38.7	26.6	—N/a	34.7	—N/a

Isolated table of Zhirinovsky–Zyuganov polls
Date	Agency	Zhirinovsky	Zyuganov	Against all	Would not vote	Undecided
28 January 1996	VCIOM	15	35	26	14	10
30 January 1996	VCIOM	18	39	36	7	—N/a
13 February 1996	VCIOM	14	35	26	14	11
February 1996	RIISNP	11.2	33.6	47.1	—N/a	—N/a
28 February 1996	VCIOM	12	39	38	11	—N/a
17 March 1996	VCIOM	13	40	32	7	8
17 March 1996	ROMIR	13	44	—N/a	—N/a	—N/a
12–24 March 1996	IISES	11	34	47	—N/a	—N/a
31 March 1996	VCIOM	13	35	32	12	8
10 April 1996	VCIOM	12	33	30	18	7
April 1996	RIISNP	11.2	37.2	41.2	—N/a	—N/a

== Subnational polls ==
=== Central Russia ===
Date	Agency	Zyuganov	Yavlinsky	Zhirinovsky	Lebed	Yeltsin	Chernomyrdin	Gaidar	Solzhenitsyn	Rutskoy	Kozyrev	Chubais	Grachev
July 1995	CESSI	7	13	5	14	9	11	4	6	3	1	0	0

=== Central Black Earth ===
Date	Agency	Zyuganov	Yavlinsky	Zhirinovsky	Lebed	Yeltsin	Chernomyrdin	Gaidar	Solzhenitsyn	Rutskoy	Kozyrev	Starovoytova	Shumeyko	Chubais	Grachev
July 1995	CESSI	8	11	7	10	5	8	3	2	3	2	2	2	1	1

=== East Siberia ===
Date	Agency	Zyuganov	Yavlinsky	Zhirinovsky	Lebed	Yeltsin	Chernomyrdin	Gaidar	Solzhenitsyn	Rutskoy	Kozyrev	Starovoytova	Shumeyko	Shakhrai	Rybkin	Chubais	Grachev
July 1995	CESSI	3	19	11	24	2	3	2	3	5	1	2	1	1	1	0	0

=== Russian Far East ===
Date	Agency	Zyuganov	Yavlinsky	Zhirinovsky	Lebed	Yeltsin	Chernomyrdin	Gaidar	Solzhenitsyn	Rutskoy	Kozyrev	Starovoytova	Shumeyko	Shakhray	Rybkin	Chubais	Grachev
July 1995	CESSI	9	12	4	11	6	4	2	6	7	2	4	1	3	1	0	0

=== Moscow ===
Date	Agency	Zyuganov	Yavlinsky	Zhirinovsky	Lebed	Yeltsin	S. Fyodorov	Luzhkov	Chernomyrdin	Gaidar	Rutskoy	Additional candidates
April 1993	ISP	—N/a	1	—N/a	—N/a	14	0.5	—N/a	1	—N/a	6	(Note: Shakhrai, Sobchak 1%, Travkin 0.5%, undecided 33%.)
January 1995	ROMIR	<1	7.9	1.0	2.2	9.2	<1	1.7	—N/a	1.5	<1	B. Fyodorov 1.0
February 1995	ROMIR	<1	4.7	1.4	1.7	10.3	1.9	<1	—N/a	1.4	<1	B. Fyodorov 1.9
July 1995	CESSI	5	17	4	9	12	—N/a	—N/a	7	5	2	(Note: Solzhenitsyn, Kozyrev, Starovoytova, Shumeyko, Shakhrai, Rybkin 1%, Chubais, Grachev 0%.)
July 1995	RCRF	—N/a	10.8	—N/a	11.9	—N/a	13.6	17.9	—N/a	—N/a	—N/a	—N/a
7-13 April 1996	FOM	11	—N/a	—N/a	—N/a	31	—N/a	—N/a	—N/a	—N/a	—N/a	—N/a
16 June 1996	Election result	14.85	7.96	1.46	9.62	61.16	0.81	—N/a	—N/a	—N/a	—N/a	(Note: Shakkum 0.64%, Gorbachev 0.50%, Vlasov 0.44%, Bryntsalov 0.19%.)

=== North/Northwest Russia ===
Date	Agency	Zyuganov	Yavlinsky	Zhirinovsky	Lebed	Yeltsin	Chernomyrdin	Gaidar	Solzhenitsyn	Rutskoy	Kozyrev	Chubais	Grachev
July 1995	CESSI	4	15	7	12	10	11	5	6	3	3	1	0

=== North Caucasus ===
Date	Agency	Zyuganov	Yavlinsky	Zhirinovsky	Lebed	Yeltsin	Chernomyrdin	Gaidar	Solzhenitsyn	Rutskoy	Kozyrev	Starovoytova	Shumeyko	Shakhrai	Chubais	Grachev
July 1995	CESSI	10	9	7	7	7	12	1	2	6	2	0	4	2	3	0

=== Saint Petersburg ===
Date	Agency	Zyuganov	Yavlinsky	Zhirinovsky	Lebed	Yeltsin	Cherno- myrdin	Gaidar	Solzhe- nitsyn	Rutskoy	Sobchak	Additional candidates
22 September 1993	CIPSP	—N/a	21.7	—N/a	—N/a	19.7	—N/a	—N/a	—N/a	18.7	5.6	Other 5.0
July 1995	CESSI	6	18	3	14	12	9	4	9	2	—N/a	(Note: Kozyrev, Starovoytova 3%, Shumeyko, Shakhrai, Rybkin 1%, Chubais, Grachev 0%.)
January 1996	Independent Analytical Center	7.9	25.3	3.5	2.7	31.1	14.3	15.4	—N/a	—N/a	3.3	(Note: S. Fyodorov 5.8%, Gorbachev 2.6%.)
16 June 1996	Election result	14.94	15.15	2.15	14.01	49.60	—N/a	—N/a	—N/a	—N/a	—N/a	(Note: S. Fyodorov 1.11%, Gorbachev 0.77%, Shakkum 0.29%, Vlasov 0.28%, Bryntsalov 0.18%.)

=== Tambov Oblast ===
First round

Date	Agency	Zyuganov	Yavlinsky	Zhirinovsky	Yeltsin
May 1996	Vse Dlya Vas	22	14.5	9.5	46
16 June 1996	Election result	52.26	4.63	6.10	20.91

=== Urals ===
Date	Agency	Zyuganov	Yavlinsky	Zhirinovsky	Lebed	Yeltsin	Chernomyrdin	Gaidar	Solzhenitsyn	Rutskoy	Kozyrev	Starovoytova	Shumeyko	Shakhrai	Chubais	Grachev
July 1995	CESSI	9	12	5	20	4	14	3	4	8	1	2	1	2	1	0

=== Volga ===
Date	Agency	Zyuganov	Yavlinsky	Zhirinovsky	Lebed	Yeltsin	Chernomyrdin	Gaidar	Solzhenitsyn	Rutskoy	Kozyrev	Starovoytova	Shumeyko	Shakhrai	Chubais	Grachev
July 1995	CESSI	2	12	6	12	4	9	3	6	7	2	1	1	2	1	0

=== Volga-Vyatka ===
Date	Agency	Zyuganov	Yavlinsky	Zhirinovsky	Lebed	Yeltsin	Chernomyrdin	Gaidar	Solzhenitsyn	Rutskoy	Kozyrev	Starovoytova	Shumeyko	Shakhrai	Chubais	Grachev
July 1995	CESSI	5	11	4	9	11	11	5	9	6	3	5	1	2	0	0

=== West Siberia ===
Date	Agency	Zyuganov	Yavlinsky	Zhirinovsky	Lebed	Yeltsin	Chernomyrdin	Gaidar	Solzhenitsyn	Rutskoy	Kozyrev	Starovoytova	Shumeyko	Shakhrai	Rybkin	Chubais	Grachev
July 1995	CESSI	5	12	4	16	12	8	3	7	7	2	2	1	1	1	0	0
