= List of chairmen of the Federation Council (Russia) =

This article contains the list of Chairmen of the Federation Council of Russia.

Since the office was created in 1994, 5 individuals, from 4 of the 85 federal subjects, have served as Chairman of the Federation Council. The numbers from each federal subjects are:

- One: Kaliningrad Oblast, Oryol Oblast and Mari El Republic
- Two: Saint Petersburg

Despite the fact that on the Federation Council officially there is no division along party lines, the three Chairman were members of political parties.

- One: Russian Party of Life and A Just Russia
- Two: United Russia
- Three: Independent

The current Chairman is Valentina Matviyenko took office in 2011, becoming the first woman Chairman of the Federation Council.

== List ==
| № | Portrait | Name | Federal Subject | Took office | Left office | Party |
|---|---|---|---|---|---|---|
| 1 | | Vladimir Shumeyko (1945–) | Kaliningrad Oblast | January 13, 1994 | January 23, 1996 | Independent |
| 2 | | Yegor Stroyev (1937–) | Oryol Oblast | January 23, 1996 | December 5, 2001 | Independent |
| 3 | | Sergey Mironov (1953–) | Saint Petersburg | December 5, 2001 | May 18, 2011 | Independent (2001 – 2002) ↓ Russian Party of Life (2002 – 2006) ↓ A Just Russia (since 2006) |
| – | | Acting Chairman; Aleksander Torshin (1953–) | Mari El Republic | May 19, 2011 | September 21, 2011 | United Russia |
| 4 | | Valentina Matviyenko (1949–) | Saint Petersburg | September 21, 2011 | Incumbent | United Russia |

== Chairmen by time in office ==
| Rank | Speaker | Time in office | No |
|---|---|---|---|
| 1 | Valentina Matviyenko | 14 years, 221 days | 4 |
| 2 | Sergey Mironov | 9 years, 164 days | 3 |
| 3 | Yegor Stroyev | 5 years, 316 days | 2 |
| 4 | Vladimir Shumeyko | 2 years, 10 days | 1 |
| 5 | Aleksander Torshin | 126 days | Acting |
