= Democratic Party of Russia =

Political party in Russia

Democratic Party of Russia Демократическая партия России
- Leader: Timur Bogdanov
- Founder: Nikolay Travkin
- Founded: 26 May 1990; 36 years ago 12 February 2012; 14 years ago (restored)
- Headquarters: Moscow
- Youth wing: Youth union of DPR
- Membership (2015): 500
- Ideology: Conservatism; Liberalism; Populism; Pro-Europeanism
- Political position: Centre-right
- European affiliation: AEN (2002–before 2006); EPP (2007–2008)
- Colours: Gold; Blue
- Seats in the State Duma: 0 / 450
- Seats in the Regional Parliaments: 0 / 3,787

Party flag

Website
- democrats.ru

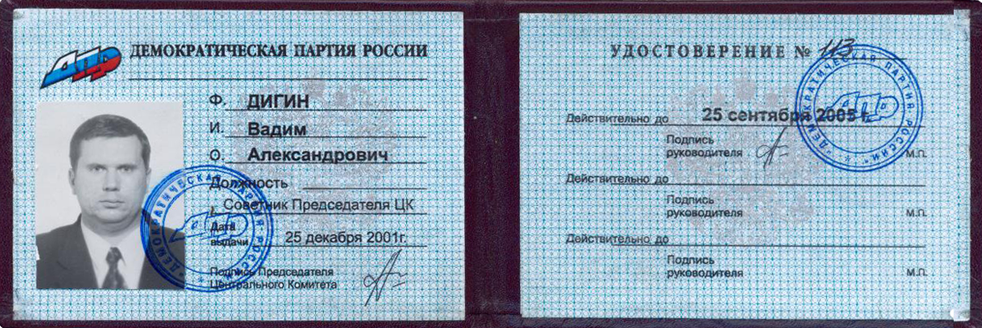
An ID card of a party member (1992–2006)

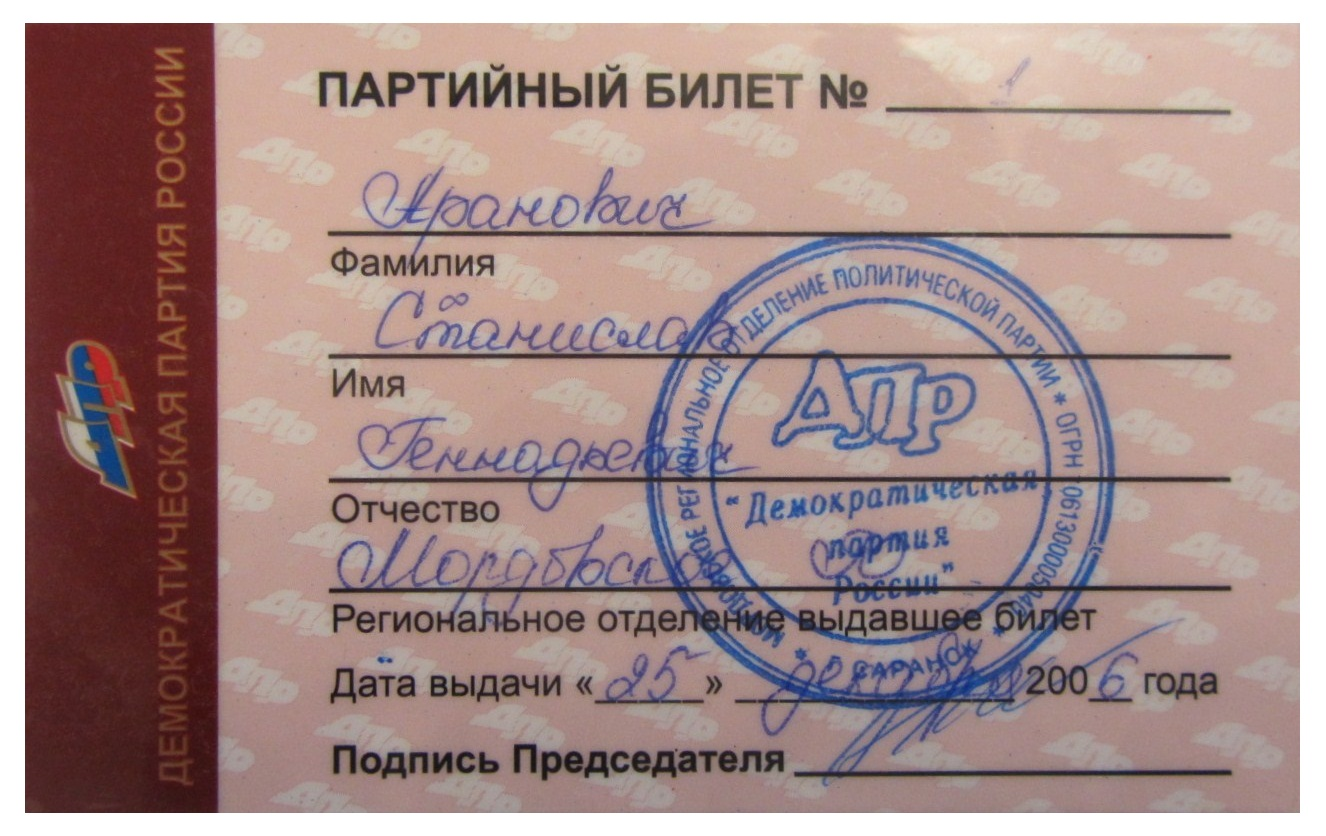
An ID card of a party member (2006–08)

The Democratic Party of Russia (Note: Russian: Демократическая Партия России (ДПР), romanized: Demokraticheskaya Partiya Rossii (DPR), IPA: [dʲɪməkrɐˈtʲitɕɪskəjə ˈpartʲɪjə rɐˈsʲiɪ (ˌdɛˌpɛˈɛr)]) is a conservative Russian political party that was founded in 1990. Under the leadership of Andrey Bogdanov, the party advocated the entry of Russia into the European Union. In 2008, the party merged with several others to form the Right Cause. It was re-established as a party and officially registered again in 2012.

== History ==
The Democratic Party of Russia was founded by Nikolay Travkin. Other early leaders included Stanislav Govorukhin and Sergey Glazyev. In the 1990s it was a prominent democratically oriented party holding seats in the first State Duma and was a member of the Democratic Russia coalition. After the coup in 1991, the party evolved from liberal anticommunism to centrism (1992–1993) and later to moderate Russian nationalism (1994–1995).

In 1991, the Democratic Party differed from other liberal/democratic organizations with its 'demopatriotic' stance (similar to Aksyuchits' Christian-Democratic Party and Astafyev's Constitutional Democrats). The Democratic Party was opposed to the dissolution of the Soviet Union and criticised Latvia's and Estonia's policies towards their Russian-speaking minorities. After the signing of the Belovezhye treaty, the DP organized a number of demonstrations against the treaty.

In the 1993 parliamentary elections in Russia, the party received 5.52% of the Proportional Representation ballot vote (2,969,533 votes) as well as 2.1% (1,094,066 votes) of votes on individual district ballots. This translated into 14 and 7 seats, respectively, for a total of 21 seats in the 450-seat Duma.

The party's stance on Yegor Gaidar's economic reforms was confusing but developed more critical in the course of time. During the 1993 Russian constitutional crisis, the party did not have a unanimous position. The party called for balloting both for the re-election of the President as well as of the legislative bodies on the referendum in April 1993; however, some of the party's leaders took the pro-Yeltsin side. Similarly, during the October 1993 events in Moscow, Travkin initially supported the so-called zero variants (annulling both Yeltsin's decree nr 1400 and the Supreme Soviet's subsequent decisions). On 4 October, Travkin supported Yeltsin's actions in suppressing the armed rebellion. The party split, however, on the issue of support for the Chernomyrdin cabinet. Travkin who took a more conciliatory stand lost the power struggle to Govorukhin and Glazyev, who were determined opponents of the government course, and Travkin consequently left the party and joined the Our Home is Russia movement.

Glazyev was made the leader in 1994 but was disbanded before the following year's legislative election. The rump DRP split further between Govorukhin and Glazyev supporters. In the 1995 Russian legislative election, the Glazyev wing took part within the Congress of Russian Communities list, whilst Govorukhin formed his own list, called the Stanislav Govorukhin Bloc.

In the 1996 presidential election, the Democratic Party supported Alexander Lebed, though some of its regional leaders supported Yeltsin's campaign. In the 2000 presidential election, the party supported Vladimir Putin.

In 2001 the party was reformed by Mikhail Prusak. In 2005 Mikhail Kasyanov tried to be elected chairman of the party, but lost to Andrei Vladimirovich Bogdanov. In June 2007, the party proposed a referendum on joining the European Union and in December it took part in the legislative election, but it did not win any seats. The DPR of that time was accused of being a virtual party used to draw away votes from the real opposition parties.

17 September 2007, with the support of the European People's Party in the headquarters of the European Union in Brussels, hosted the XXI Congress of the Democratic Party of Russia, which adopted the decision on the accession of Russia to the European Union.

In the 2007 Russian legislative election the party won 0.13% of votes, not breaking the 7% barrier, and thus no seats in the Duma. As of 1 January 2007, according to the Federal Registration Service, the party had 82,183 members. In 2008, the DPS merged with several others to form the Right Cause party.

The party was re-established in 2012. According to the results of the regional elections of 2012, 2013, and 2014, the party failed to win in regional and city parliaments. In 2014 Andrei Bogdanov head created by the participation of the Communist Party of Social Justice, leader of the Democratic Party of Russia was elected his brother Timur Bogdanov. The Bogdanov brothers are reported to be behind the creation of spoiler parties to benefit the ruling United Russia party.

== Electoral results ==
=== Presidential elections ===
Election	Candidate	First round		Second round		Result
Election	Candidate	Votes	%	Votes	%	Result
1991	Endorsed Boris Yeltsin	45,552,041	57.30%			Elected ✓
1996	Endorsed Alexander Lebed	10,974,736	14.52%			Lost ✗
2000	Endorsed Vladimir Putin	39,740,434	52.94%			Elected ✓
2004	Boycotted the elections					
2008	Andrei Bogdanov	968,344	1.30%			Lost ✗
2012	Party was part of Right Cause and did not participate in the elections					
2018	Endorsed Oleg Bulayev	Withdrew from the elections				
2024	Endorsed Vladimir Putin	76,277,708	88.48%			Elected ✓

=== Legislative elections ===
Election	Party leader	Performance					Rank	Government
Election	Party leader	Votes	%	± pp	Seats	+/–	Rank	Government
1993	Nikolay Travkin	2,969,533	5.52%	New	15 / 450	New	8th	Opposition (1993–1994)
1993	Nikolay Travkin	2,969,533	5.52%	New	15 / 450	New	8th	Coalition (1994–1995)
1995	Sergey Glazyev	7,737,431	4.31% (CRC)	▼1.21	5 / 450	▼10	8th	Opposition
1999	Georgy Hatsenkov	Did not contest						Extra-parliamentary
2003	Vladimir Podoprigora	136,295	0.22%	▼4.09	0 / 450	0	▼20th	Extra-parliamentary
2007	Andrei Bogdanov	89,780	0.13%	▼0.09	0 / 450	0	▲11th	Extra-parliamentary
2011	Andrei Bogdanov	Party was part of Right Cause and did not participate in the elections						
2016	Timur Borganov	Did not contest						Extra-parliamentary
