= Nikolay Travkin =

Russian politician

- Николай Травкин
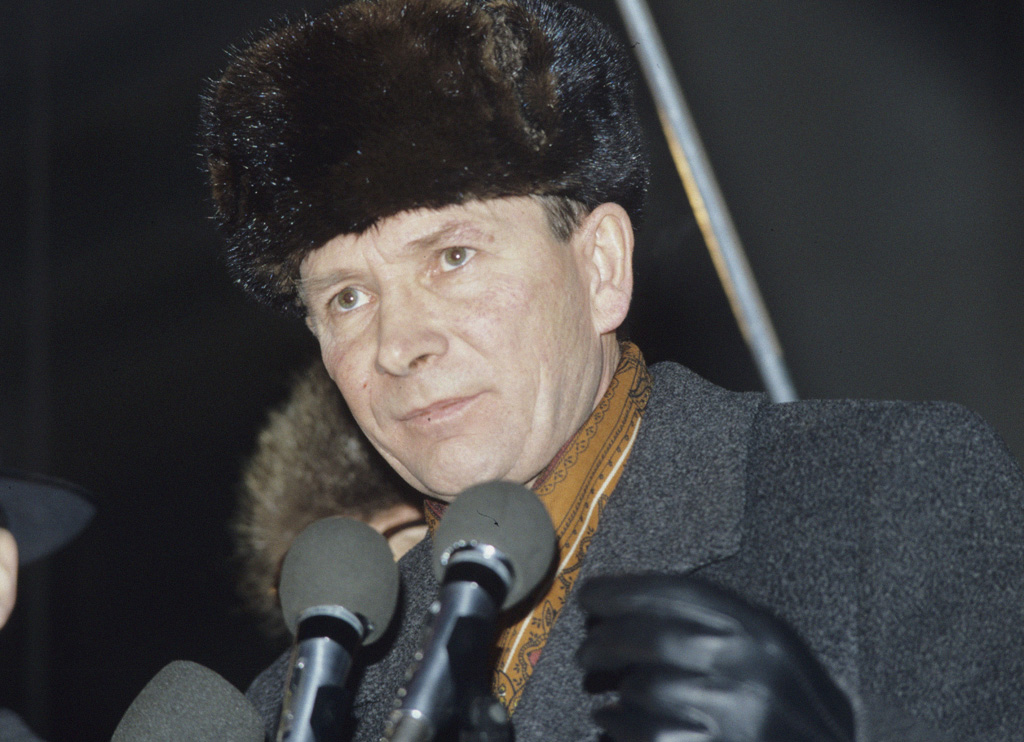
- Travkin in 1991

Member of the State Duma
- In office 11 January 1994 – 29 December 2003

Personal details
- Born: Nikolay Ilyich Travkin; 19 March 1946 (age 80) Novonikolskoye, Russia, Soviet Union
- Party: Democratic Party of Russia
- Nikolay Travkin's voice From the Echo of Moscow program, 7 March 2015

Nikolay Ilyich Travkin (Russian: Николай Ильич Травкин; born 19 March 1946) is a Russian politician who served as a member of State Duma serving from 1994 to 2003.

He had been a former member of the Supreme Soviet of the Soviet Union.

In March 1990 he resigned from the Communist Party of the Soviet Union and founded the Democratic Party of Russia.

== Awards and decorations ==
- Hero of Socialist Labor (comes with the Order of Lenin, 1986)
- Order of the Red Banner of Labour
- Order of Merit for the Fatherland (1996)
