= Novonikolskoye =

Novonikolskoye Новоникольское
- Selo
- Location within Bashkortostan Location within Russia
- Coordinates: 54°48′N 55°11′E
- Country: Russia
- Region: Bashkortostan
- District: Blagovarsky District
- Time zone: UTC+5:00

Novonikolskoye (Russian: Новоникольское) is a rural locality (a selo) in Alexeyevsky Selsoviet, Blagovarsky District, Bashkortostan, Russia. The population was 282 as of 2010. There are two streets.

== Geography ==
Novonikolskoye is located 28 km northeast of Yazykovo (the district's administrative centre) by road. Moiseyevo is the nearest rural locality.
