= Artyom Tarasov =

Russian political activist (1950–2017)

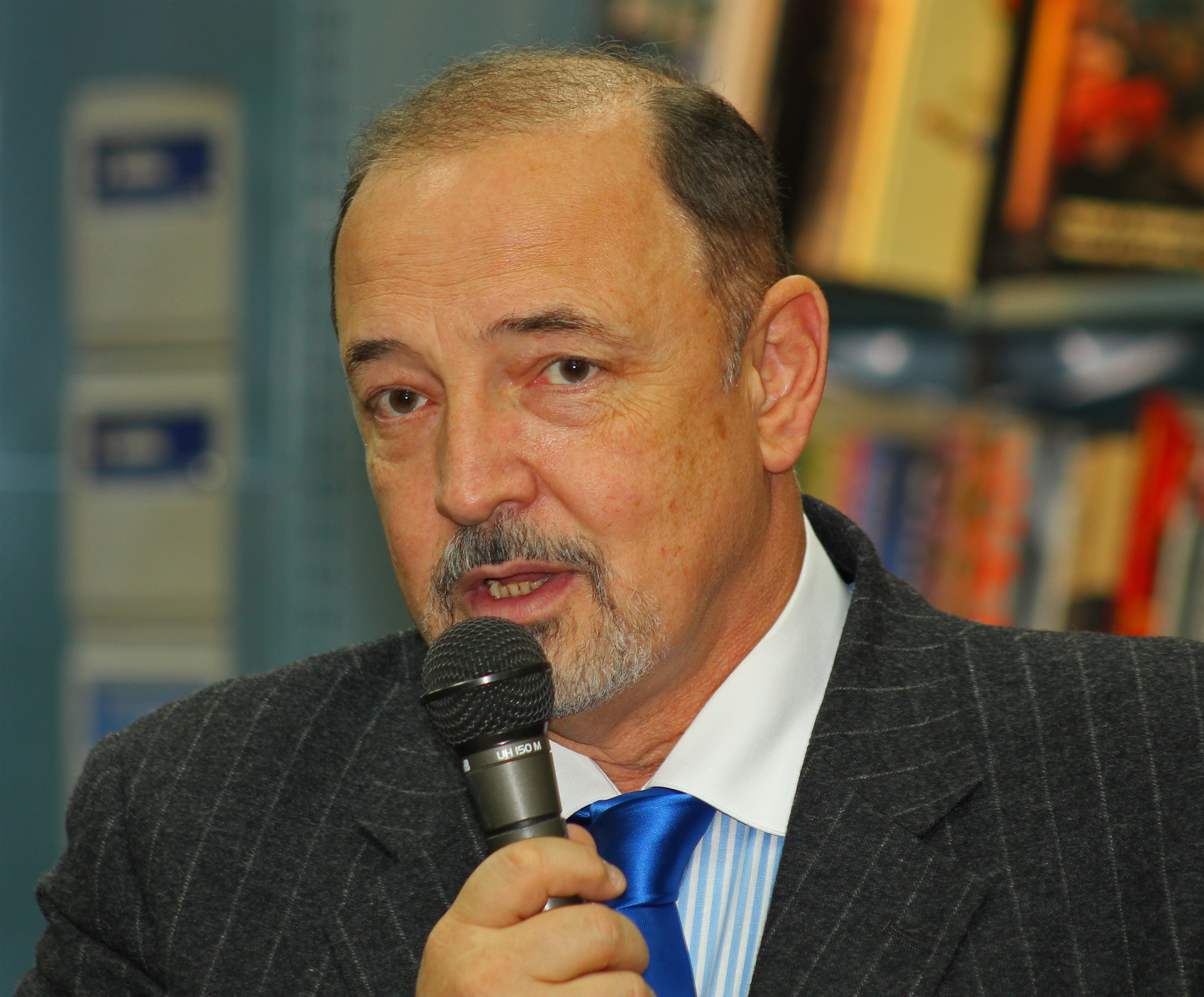
- Tarasov In 2011
- Born: Artyom Mikhaylovich Tarasov; 4 July 1950; Moscow, Russia
- Died: 22 July 2017 (aged 67); Moscow, Russia
- Citizenship: Armenian; Russian
- Occupations: Businessman; Political activist

Artem or Artyom Mikhaylovich Tarasov (Russian: Артём Миха́йлович Тара́сов; 4 July 1950, Moscow – 22 July 2017, Moscow) was a Russian businessman and political activist of Armenian descent.

== Biography ==
Tarasov was a descendant of a well-known family of Armenian (Cherkesogai) traders. Oil industrialist and dandy Nikolai Tarasov (1882–1910), co-founder of Moscow Bat theatre, and Henri Troyat (Lev Tarasov) are among his paternal relatives. Born to a photographer father and academic mother, Tarasov received several degrees as an engineer, a computer scientist, and an economic planner. He had a successful career as a scientific manager. His company, Progress, was the tenth co-operative officially registered in Moscow, but it was shut down by the Moscow authorities as “amoral, dangerous to society and contrary to socialist principles”. Then, he founded his next successful co-operative, Technika. Tarasov was the co-founder of Kommersant daily newspaper, the first independent airline, Transaero, and was elected to the Russian parliament. After a conflict with Soviet officials in 1990, he left the USSR and settled in London. In 1993, he returned to Russia and was once again elected to the State Duma. In 1996, he decided to run for Presidency as an independent pro-business candidate, but his application was rejected by the Central Election Commission.

By the late 2000s Tarasov was spending most of his time in London. In 2005, his book, Millionaire, detailing the rise of post-Soviet oligarchs, was published.

Tarasov died in Moscow on 22 July 2017 due to heart disease.

== Links ==
- Official site
- The first millionaire of the USSR from rb.ru – (in Russian)
- Interview with Artyom Tarasov from Gazeta.ru – (in Russian)
- Артём Тарасов: Миллионер Из Трущоб "Artem Tarasov: Slumdog Millionaire", from Interview Magazine – (in Russian)
