= Sergey Shakhray =

Russian politician

- Сергей Шахрай
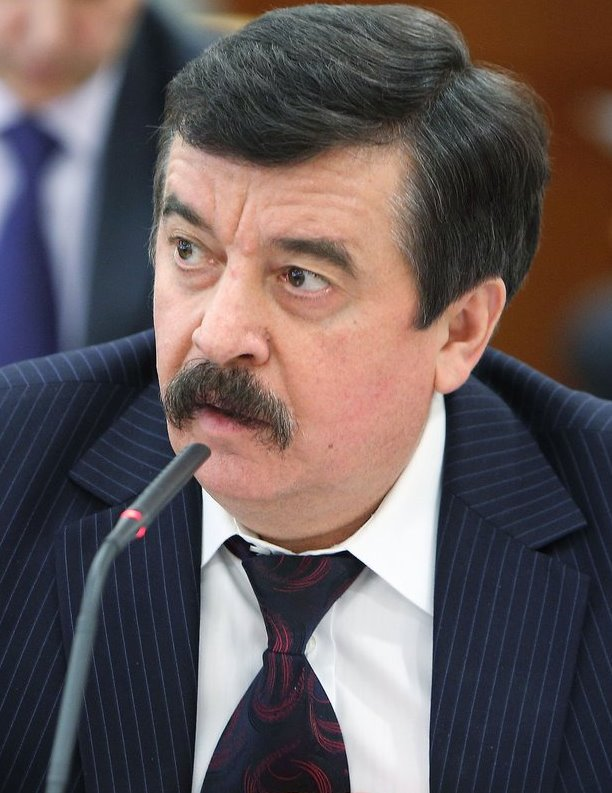
- Shakhray in 2014

Chief of Staff of the Accounts Chamber
- In office 12 November 2004 – 1 October 2013
- President: Vladimir Putin
- Succeeded by: Yury Voronin

Presidential Plenipotentiary Representative in the Constitutional Court
- In office 7 December 1996 – 29 June 1998
- President: Boris Yeltsin
- Preceded by: Mikhail Mityukov
- Succeeded by: Mikhail Mityukov

Deputy Prime Minister of Russia
- In office 7 April 1994 – 5 January 1996
- President: Boris Yeltsin
- Prime Minister: Boris Yeltsin (de facto); Yegor Gaidar (acting); Viktor Chernomyrdin

Personal details
- Born: 30 April 1956 (age 70) Simferopol, Crimean Oblast, Ukrainian SSR, Soviet Union
- Party: Party of Russian Unity and Accord
- Spouse: Tatyana Shakhray
- Education: Rostov-on-Don State University; Financial University under the Government of the Russian Federation
- Occupation: Lawyer; politician
- Awards: Order "For Merit to the Fatherland", Order of Friendship, Medal "Defender of a Free Russia", Honoured Lawyer of Russia, Russian Federation Presidential Certificate of Honour

Sergey Mikhaylovich Shakhray (Russian: Сергей Михайлович Шахрай; born 30 April 1956) is a Russian politician and lawyer. He is a co-author of the Constitution of the Russian Federation.

Shakhray graduated from the Rostov-on-Don State University in 1978 with a degree in law.

In December 1991 – March 1992, November 1992 – January 1994, April 1994 – January 1996: Deputy Prime Minister of Russia.

He has the federal state civilian service rank of 1st class Active State Councillor of the Russian Federation.

He is of Terek Cossack descent.

Preceded by Mikhail Mityukov	Russian president's Envoy to the Constitutional Court of the Russian Federation; December 7, 1996, – June 29, 1998	Succeeded by Mikhail Mityukov
