= Andrei Kozyrev =

Russian politician (born 1951)

- Андрей Козырев
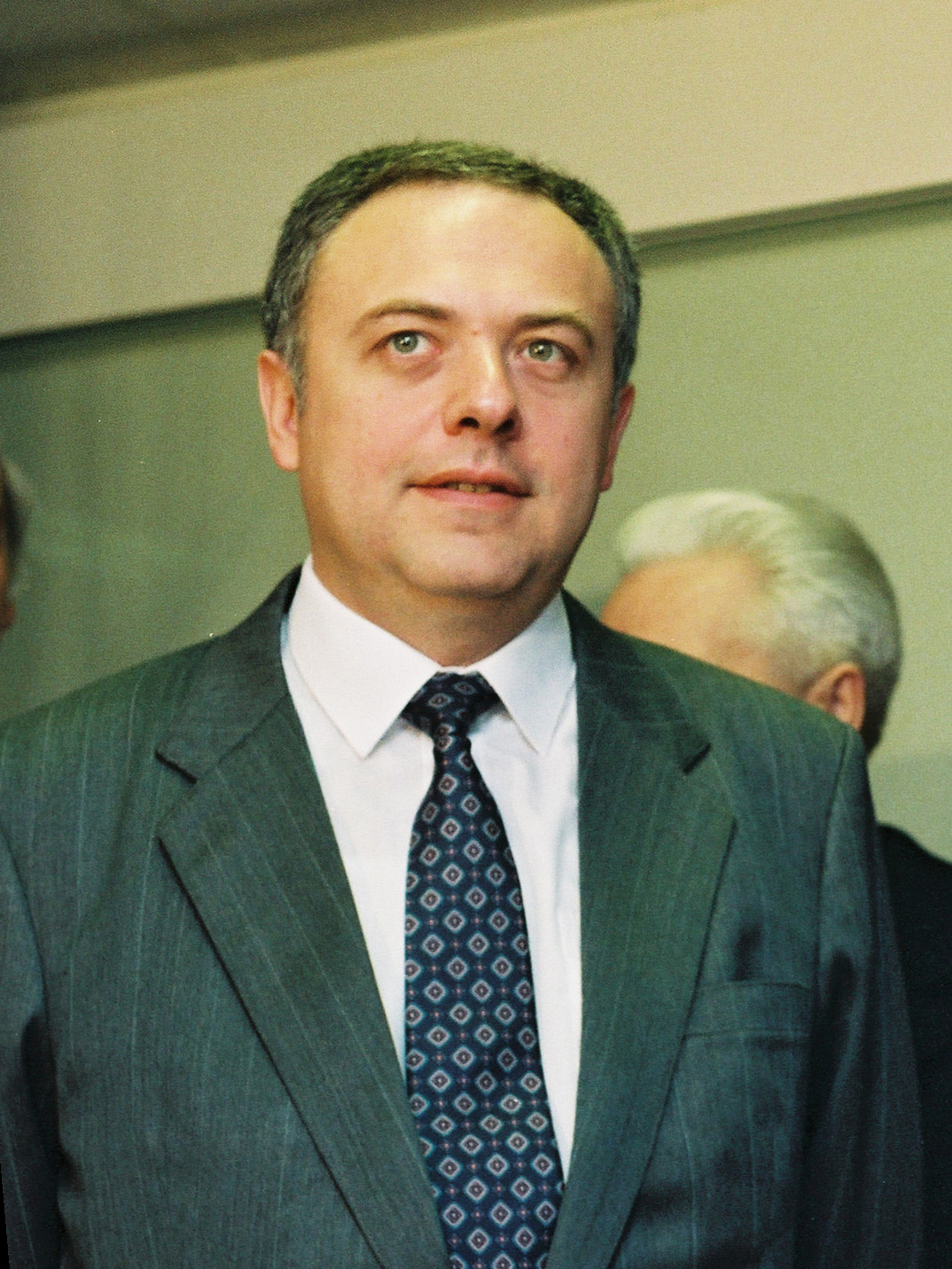
- Kozyrev in 1992

Minister of Foreign Affairs
- In office 11 October 1990 – 5 January 1996; Russian SFSR: to 16 May 1992
- President: Boris Yeltsin
- Preceded by: Vladimir Vinogradov
- Succeeded by: Yevgeny Primakov

Personal details
- Born: 27 March 1951 (age 75) Brussels, Belgium
- Spouse: Elena Kozyreva
- Education: Moscow State Institute of International Relations
- Andrei Kozyrev's voice Kozyrev on the Echo of Moscow program, 9 February 2006

Andrei Vladimirovich Kozyrev (Russian: Андрей Владимирович Козырев; born 27 March 1951) is a Russian politician and businessman who was the Minister of Foreign Affairs under President Boris Yeltsin, during the Russian SFSR from 1990 and during the Russian Federation from 1992, in office until 1996. Kozyrev was seen as supporting Yeltsin's liberal democratic outlook and tried to develop Russia's foreign policy immediately after the fall of the Soviet Union to no longer see NATO as a threat, pursue integration with the West, and not assert itself in the former Soviet countries. Kozyrev's pro-Western and liberal foreign policy fell out of favor because of NATO expansion that began from 1995, and he was replaced by Yevgeny Primakov in early 1996, who represented Russian "security state" interests.

Towards the end of his tenure Kozyrev took a more conservative position, arguing to Western diplomats that hardline nationalists were the alternative to the Yeltsin administration, and that NATO expansion risked encouraging nationalist politics within Russia.

He was the Russian representative during the signing of the Oslo I and Oslo II Accords, and the Israel–Jordan peace treaty. Kozyrev had graduated from the Moscow State Institute of International Relations (MGIMO) with a PhD in history before joining the Soviet Ministry of Foreign Affairs in 1974, holding various positions in it before being appointed foreign minister.

== Early life and education ==
Kozyrev was born in Brussels in 1951, the son of a Soviet engineer temporarily working there. He was educated at the Moscow State Institute of International Relations, a school for diplomats operated by the Ministry of Foreign Affairs. Before beginning his studies there in 1969, he spent a year as a fitter in the Kommunar machine-building factory in Moscow. He is partly Jewish.

== Soviet diplomatic career ==
Kozyrev completed his studies in 1974. He entered the Soviet Ministry of Foreign Affairs as a speech writer and researcher in the Department of International Organizations, which was responsible for issues concerning the United Nations and arms control, including biological and chemical warfare issues. Over the next three years, he earned a post-graduate degree in historical science and published several books on the arms trade and the United Nations.

Kozyrev's career in the Foreign Ministry marked him as a promising young Soviet diplomat. He became an attaché in the Department of International Organizations in 1979 and third secretary the next year. Promotions came regularly: he became second secretary in 1982; first secretary in 1984; counselor in 1986. Following the reorganization of the ministry by Gorbachev's foreign minister, Eduard Shevardnadze, he became deputy chief of the renamed Administration of International Organizations in 1988. The next year Kozyrev became chief of the administration, replacing a man 20 years his senior.

Kozyrev was promoted to the diplomatic rank of the Ambassador Extraordinary and Plenipotentiary — the highest diplomatic rank in the Soviet Union — by the Decree of the President of the Soviet Union Mikhail Gorbachev of 12 December 1990 No. UP-1177.

== Russian Foreign Minister ==
Seizing the opportunity opened by Gorbachev's glasnost in summer 1989, Kozyrev wrote an article repudiating the Leninist concept of the "international class struggle", the very essence of Leninism. Firstly published in the Soviet press, the article was reproduced in The Washington Post and other major news sources all over the world, making him known as a political figure.

In October 1990, a rebellious parliament of the Russian Federation voted to appoint Kozyrev the foreign minister. After the failed Soviet coup attempt of 1991, he found himself in president Boris Yeltsin's team of young reformers, which included Yegor Gaidar and Anatoly Chubais, and shared their Western liberal-democratic ideals. He became Russian foreign minister at the age of 39 and gained and kept the confidence of Boris Yeltsin as Russia became an independent state and, in many ways, the successor to the Soviet Union. Kozyrev tried to make Russia a partner with the West in the formation of the post-Cold War world. He emphasized cooperation over conflict with the United States while insisting that Russia be treated as a great power in international politics rather than as a fallen superpower. He favored major arms control agreements with the United States and the nonproliferation of nuclear arms. He was also viewed by many as one of the most important voices for liberalism and democracy in post-communist Russia.

Kozyrev was one of the drafters of the Belovezh Accords. He wrote in his 2019 memoir: "The signed document establishing the Commonwealth of Independent States was in effect a death sentence for the Soviet Union, the largest country on earth and our fatherland. It was an emotional moment for us. Yet we knew it was inevitable, and we had done our best to avoid a much more disastrous outcome."

In 1992 Kozyrev together with nine other Ministers of Foreign Affairs from the Baltic Sea area, and an EU commissioner, founded the Council of the Baltic Sea States (CBSS) and the EuroFaculty.

According to Dmitri Simes, in the spring of 1992 Kozyrev told former U.S. president Richard Nixon during his visit to Moscow that Russia had suffered from focusing on itself at the expense of the world, and he defined the new Russian national interest as "universal human values." Nixon had asked him what the new Russian government considered Russia's national interests to be. After their conversation, Nixon thought that Kozyrev was "a nice man" but risked weakening his own position in the eyes of the Russian public if he followed the United States on all foreign policy questions, and that this would make the U.S. look guilty by association.

On 15 December 1992, Kozyrev underlined his opposition to conservative, nationalistic forces in Russia with a dramatic and unprecedented diplomatic maneuver. He stunned the foreign ministers of the Conference on Security and Cooperation in Europe (CSCE) and the Russian delegation alike with a speech that echoed many of the positions of the nationalist opposition in Russia, and seemed to threaten a return to anti-Western policies. But an hour after giving the speech he retracted it, warning that the views he had earlier espoused reflected "the demands of the most extreme elements of the opposition in Russia". He had reason to worry, for one month earlier Pravda had reported that he was "splitting into pieces the former socialist camp … Kozyrev in effect is paving the way for the expansion of a new American empire." Others accused the "young reformers" in the Gaidar government of breaking "historical" ties with Warsaw Pact partners and Kozyrev of abandoning the "traditional" zone of Russian interests thanks to his obsession with a pro-Western foreign policy. The CSCE speech occurred a scant five days after the defenestration of Gaidar.

Kozyrev painted Yevgeny Primakov, his contemporary at the newly formed SVR, as a reactionary who entertained "the usual prejudices against NATO."

However, by late 1993, at the UN General Assembly Kozyrev essentially argued for the Monroe Doctrine for Russia and a right to intervene in the post-Soviet conflicts. He declared in September 1993, during the War in Abkhazia (1992–93), that: "Russia realizes that no international organization or group of states can replace our peacekeeping efforts in this specific post-Soviet space."

Kozyrev tried to promote the idea of dual nationality in the former Soviet empire but was unsuccessful.

There is still some question as to his role in the confusion of Yeltsin over the German re-unification and Helsinki Final Act and ensuing Partnership for Peace push for NATO expansion. The window of opportunity to bring Russia into NATO closed by the end of Yeltsin's first term of office because the only way to avoid an explosion of fear in Russia was to bring Russia out of the cold first before the other Warsaw Pact countries; in the event, the opposite was done.

US Secretaries of State that were his opposite number during his tenure were: Jim Baker, Lawrence Eagleburger and Warren Christopher.

=== NATO expansion ===
In the summer of 1995 Kozyrev wrote in Foreign Policy that "Western politicians, again Americans in particular, have increasingly tended to substitute a strategy of a rapid expansion of NATO without its fundamental transformation for partnership between the alliance and Eastern Europe, including Russia. This course of action is fraught with the danger of redemarcating Europe. It also encourages the growth of anti-Western and imperial political forces in Russia and would again bring about a Western rejection of partnership and a split in Europe." His conclusion was that the Russian public expects its government to defend its security and economic interests abroad, and Russian democrats had to be able to do this to maintain their own domestic credibility, without accusations from the Western countries of imperialism. He also wrote that the continued insistence on seeing Russia as a security threat in Europe implies to Russians that it does not matter what ideology or views their government has.

=== NNPT and conflict with Ukraine over Crimea ===
In October 1991 Vice President Alexander Rutskoi went to Kyiv to negotiate the price of Russian natural gas exports to Ukraine, and through Ukrainian territory to Europe. On that visit he also claimed Russian control and ownership of the Black Sea fleet, based in Sevastopol, and, indirectly, Russian sovereignty over the whole Crimean Peninsula. Rutskoi publicly warned Kyiv against conflict with Moscow, which both had nuclear weapons and had the ability to claim sovereignty over Crimea.

In April 1992 and March 1993 two similar resolutions that claimed Crimea were passed by the Russian parliament. The Ukrainians turned for help to the United States, but it sought to aggregate Soviet nuclear weapons in the hands of Moscow and to occupy ex-Soviet scientists with the Nunn–Lugar Cooperative Threat Reduction programme. The Budapest Memorandum, which was co-written by Kozyrev, provided security assurances to the three minor ex-Soviet countries in exchange for their accession to the Nuclear non-proliferation treaty and security guarantees from Russia, the United States, and the United Kingdom. By the end of 1996 all nuclear weapons were removed to Russian territory, and 18 years later Vladimir Putin reneged on the deal when he invaded Crimea and the Donbas.

== State Duma deputy ==
In the December 1993 elections, Kozyrev ran for a seat in the lower house, the State Duma, as a candidate on the list of the liberal Russia's Choice bloc in the Murmansk region. He took a seat as a representative from Murmansk when the State Duma met in January 1994, having won 60 percent of the vote in a field of 10.

He had been blamed for the international controversy over the conflict in Chechnya. He had also been targeted as a scapegoat for failing to stop North Atlantic Treaty Organization (NATO) bombing of the Bosnian Serbs and of NATO plans to expand into Eastern Europe.

Andrei Kozyrev at Signing of the Israel-Jordan Peace Treaty, 1994

Kozyrev was criticized by the Russian State Duma for capitulating to the West, which led to Russia's loss of "superpower" status, as well as for the alleged failure to support the Bosnian Serbs during the Bosnian War.

After being elected a second time to the State Duma in Murmansk in January 1996, Kozyrev left the ministry as from now on it was prohibited to occupy both positions. He was succeeded as head of the MFA by Yevgeny Primakov. It was a political choice both by him and president. When asked if he had been "sacrificed by Yeltsin ... to pacify anti-reform forces?", Kozyrev told the Los Angeles Times, "of course, there has been some backtracking. Let's face it, there is stagnation. ... It was a genuine political conflict. I lost. I was overruled. I believe that my time will come again, that my policies will be brought back, sooner or later." Since the conclusion of the second Duma term Kozyrev left the government for private business.

Kozyrev was a member of the Duma until the 2000 elections.

== Later life, memoirs and punditry ==
Kozyrev, who is convinced that the "authoritarian, anti-Western system Mr. Putin has re-imposed will not prevail", moved to the US in 2010, and has lived at least since 2015 in Miami, from where he published in 2019 a memoir of his time at the centre of Yeltsinian intrigue, The Firebird: The Elusive Fate of Russian Democracy (Foreword by Michael McFaul. Pittsburgh: The University of Pittsburgh Press, 2019). Kozyrev warned a 2014 audience of diplomats that "Empty promises are even worse than empty threats."

In his memoir Kozyrev "complains that the U.S. aggressively pushed Russia out of its own traditional markets, (i.e. the Warsaw Pact countries) leaving Moscow to nurse its wounds and sell weapons and technology to rogue regimes. Overall, he feels that the West lacked "a figure of Winston Churchill’s caliber" in the 1990s who would have helped Russia make the perilous transition to democracy." Kozyrev adds: “It’s not America’s fault, it’s not the West’s fault that our efforts in this period failed […] America was very helpful, we wanted more help of course – needed more help – but it was ultimately on us to deliver” and “Yeltsin had only very vague ideas about what kind of new system we should build […] People like Gaidar and myself did have an idea, but had no experience of capitalism. This was different from China, for example, where Deng Xiaoping actually lived in the States and therefore had firsthand experience of capitalism […] None of us knew what we wanted to build in a practical sense […] Our problem was that we were aware, from the very beginning […] that Yeltsin was the right person to destroy the old system, but not to build a new one.”

In an audience at the James A. Baker III Institute for Public Policy in 2020 Kozyrev said Obama's response to the 2014 Crimean status referendum and subsequent Annexation of Crimea by the Russian Federation was "feeble".

Kozyrev feels that some of the problems in Chechnya stem from the particular brand of Wahhabi Islam supplied through international propagation of Salafism and Wahhabism by Saudi Arabia.

Kozyrev wrote somewhat presciently in 2016 of his time in government that "In the worst case, there could be a replay of the Yugoslavia catastrophe. The region was at a tipping point, and unfortunately, despite initial success, the democratizing forces inside the Russian government did not succeed."

Kozyrev was a distinguished fellow at the Wilson Center’s Kennan Institute in 2016.

=== 2022 Russian invasion of Ukraine ===
Kozyrev has been an outspoken critic of the 2022 Russian invasion of Ukraine, and of Russian President Vladimir Putin's attitude towards the west, stating,

"All of these guys, mostly from the KGB, never agreed that the Soviet Union lost the Cold War to the Russian people together with the democratic world outside. They don't buy it. They want to stop it. And now they think this [invasion of Ukraine] is their last decisive battle."

In March 2022, Kozyrev said he anticipated that Kremlin officials may oust Putin following failures in the invasion.

In an early interview Kozyrev proposed the supply of armaments by NATO partners rather than a direct confrontation with Russia. He stressed that Putin will not stop his westward conquest with Ukraine if he is not stopped there, and lamented the fact that the Ukrainians had been improperly armed until after the invasion began. Putin cannot be provoked, said Kozyrev, as he is already in a heightened state of aggression and will perceive any weakness as an invitation to further aggression. Kozyrev, who wrote the Budapest Memorandum, called the invasion "a flagrant violation" and found the conduct of Putin in this regard shameful. Kozyrev was disappointed in the evolution of Sergey Lavrov. He observed that Putin was fearful of COVID-19 and hence he surmised that Putin is so attached to this life that he will not risk nuclear war; he found Putin to be the anti-Russian epitome.

In another interview Kozyrev, who tweeted on 1 March for Russian diplomats to resign, said Putin "acts out of desperation. That is clear."

In a 12 March 2022 interview broadcast when the Russian failure to capture the Ukrainian capital was evident, he called Putin a "lunatic… detached from reality… delusional". Kozyrev opined that Putin thought the West was weak and decadent. Kozyrev considered this war as a disaster.

Kozyrev wrote in May 2022 an essay for the Journal of Democracy entitled "Why Putin Must Be Defeated" that he and Andrey Vladimirovich Kolesnikov remark the parallels between the post-1933 Gleichschaltung that Nazified German society and the several laws passed by the Russians and executive orders signed by Putin "basically [to] criminaliz[e] all forms of dissent" and to dismiss the remnants of independent Russian media. He observes sadly that Anton Troianovski wrote that "The history of mass execution and political imprisonment in the Soviet era, and the denunciation of fellow citizens encouraged by the state… now looms over Russia's deepening… repression," and finds the two 20th-century systems to have one thread in common: totalitarianism.

On 11 April 2025, Russia’s Justice Ministry added Kozyrev to Russia's registry of “foreign agents”.

== Academic criticisms ==
Australian academic Russologist Graeme Gill finds Kozyrev's tenure at the Russian MFA "rather supine".

Sergey Radchenko finds Kozyrev's 2019 memoir to offer "fascinating insights into Moscow's foreign policy at a time when everything seemed possible, including, perhaps, a prosperous, democratic Russia that was anchored in the West. Kozyrev chased that goal like that firebird of the Russian fairy tale, after which the book is titled, though unlike the hero of the Russian fairy tale, he never managed to catch it. Didn't even come close."

== Publications ==
- Aslanli, Kenan (2024). Russia's Foreign Energy Policy: Resources, Actors, and Conflicts. Routledge. ISBN 978-1-032-52808-3.
- Malinova, Olga; Casula, Philipp (2010). Lecours, André; Moreno, Luis (eds.). Nationalism and Democracy: Dichotomies, complementarities, and oppositions. Routledge. ISBN 978-0-415-55915-7.
- Simes, Dmitri (1999). After the Collapse: Russia Seeks Its Place As A Great Power. Simon & Schuster. ISBN 0-684-82716-6.
- Kozyrev, Andrei (Summer 1995). "Partnership or Cold Peace?". Foreign Policy (99): 3–14. doi:10.2307/1149002. JSTOR 1149002.
