= Chairman of the Federation Council (Russia) =

Government role in the Russian Parliament

Chairman of the Federation Council of the Federal Assembly of the Russian Federation Председатель Совета Федерации Федерального Собрания Российской Федерации
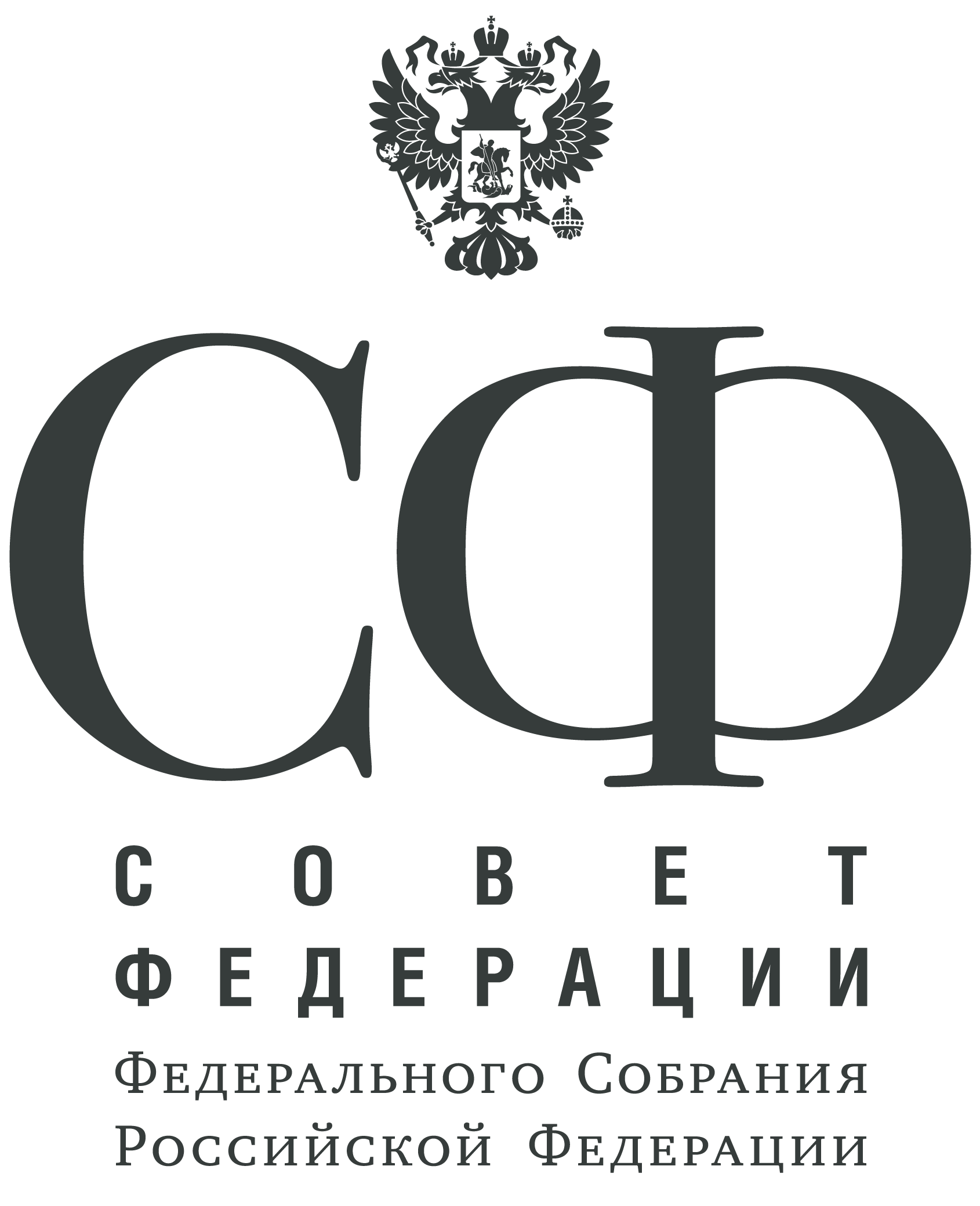
- Emblem of the Federation Council

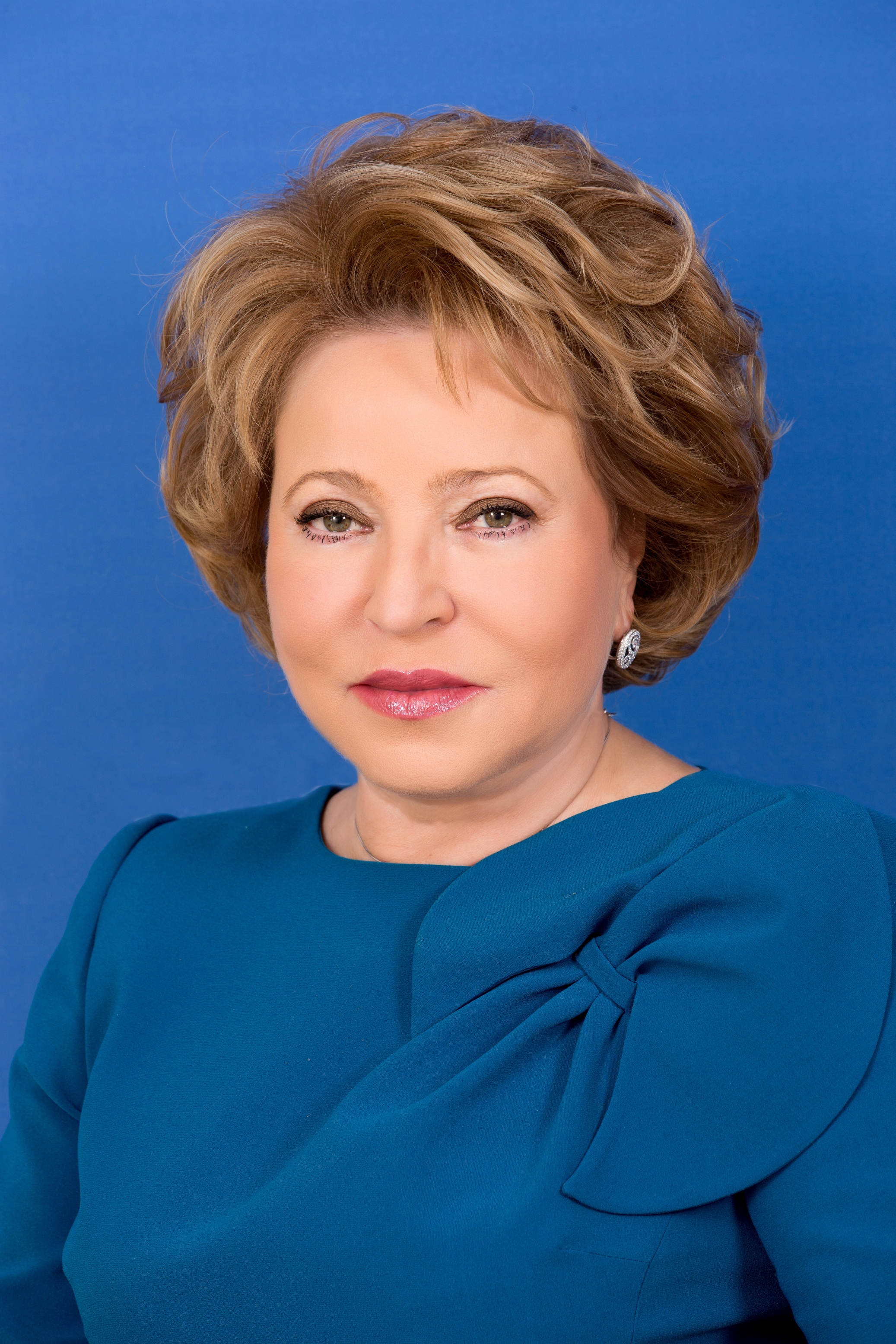
- Incumbent; Valentina Matviyenko since 21 September 2011
- Appointer: Federation Council
- Term length: No term limit
- Formation: 13 January 1994; 32 years ago
- First holder: Vladimir Shumeyko
- Website: Federation Council

The Chairman of the Federation Council of the Federal Assembly of the Russian Federation (Russian: Председатель Совета Федерации Федерального собрания Российской Федерации), also informally called Speaker (спикер), is the presiding officer of the upper house of the Russian parliament. It is the third highest position, after the President and the Prime Minister, in the government of Russia. In the case of incapacity of the President and Prime Minister, the chairman of the Federation Council becomes Acting President of Russia.

== Procedure for election ==
The Chairman is elected from among the senators. That is the position held by one of the members of the Federation Council. The election is conducted by secret ballot using the ballot. The Federation Council may decide to hold a secret ballot using the electronic system.

Candidates for the post of Chairman of the Federation Council senators offered. Each member of the Council of the Federation has the right to propose only one candidate. For all candidates who have consented to stand, held a discussion during which they act at the meeting and answer questions from senators. After discussion, the Chamber approves the list of candidates for voting.

A candidate is considered elected if he received a vote of more than half of the votes of the members of the Federation Council. If the post of Chairman of the Federation Council was made more than two candidates and none of them has received the required number of votes for election, a second round of voting on the two candidates who received the greatest number of votes.

=== Election results ===
==== 1994 ====
Candidate	Federal subject	12 January 1994		13 January 1994
Candidate	Federal subject	First round	Second round	13 January 1994
✓ Vladimir Shumeyko	Kaliningrad Oblast	85	81	98
Pyotr Romanov	Krasnoyarsk Krai	56	79	52
Eduard Rossel	Sverdlovsk Oblast	18	—N/a	6
Aleksandr Titkin	Tula Oblast	5	—N/a	—N/a
Kirsan Ilyumzhinov	Kalmykia	—N/a	—N/a	7
Invalid ballots		4	6	4
Not voting		3	5	4
Total		171		

==== 1996–present ====
Date	Candidate	Federal subject	For	Against	Abstain	Not voting	Total
23 January 1996	✓ Yegor Stroyev	Oryol Oblast	147	19	1	11	178
5 December 2001	✓ Sergey Mironov	Saint Petersburg	151	0	0	27	178
29 January 2003	✓ Sergey Mironov	Saint Petersburg	159	0	2	17	178
30 March 2007	✓ Sergey Mironov	Saint Petersburg	156	0	1	15	172
21 September 2011	✓ Valentina Matviyenko	Saint Petersburg	140	0	1	25	166
1 October 2014	✓ Valentina Matviyenko	Saint Petersburg	141	0	0	27	168
25 September 2019	✓ Valentina Matviyenko	Saint Petersburg	154	0	0	16	170
25 September 2024	✓ Valentina Matviyenko	Saint Petersburg	155	0	0	23	178

== Term of office ==
The office of the Chairman of the Federation Council has no term limit. The Chairman remains in his post until the end of his senatorial term. Even if he is re-elected for a new Senatorial term, the chairmanship automatically ends. If the former chairman is re-elected as senator, he can be re-elected as Chairman of the Federation Council.

== Shift from the post of Chairman ==
The Chairman of the Federation Council can be dismissed by a decision of the Council of Federation receiving the majority of votes of the members of the Federation Council. The question of removal from office is considered by the Federation Council on admission of personal statements of the chairman or at the suggestion of a group of members of the Federation Council of no less than one fifth of the members of the Federation Council.

== Powers of the Chairman ==
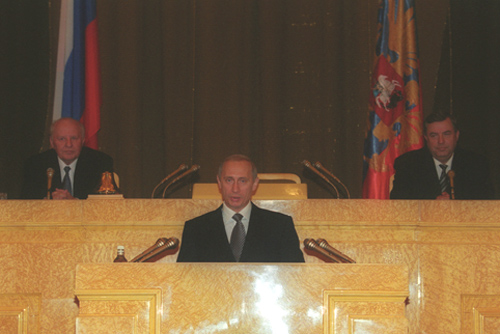
Chairman Yegor Stroyev (left) with Chairman of the State Duma Gennadiy Seleznyov behind President Vladimir Putin at the 2000 Presidential Address to the Federal Assembly.

Chairman of the Federation Council:

- convene meetings of the Council of the Federation, including the extraordinary;
- creates the draft agenda of the meeting of the Federation Council, makes it to the Council Chamber, the Federation Council is considered by the Council Chamber of the draft agenda of the meeting of the Federation Council;
- leads the meeting of the Chamber;
- signs decisions of the Federation Council;
- It leads to swearing persons appointed as a judge of the Constitutional Court of the Russian Federation and the General Prosecutor of the Russian Federation;
- It is responsible for internal regulations of the Chamber in accordance with the authority vested in it by this Regulation;
- allocates responsibilities between the First Deputy Chairman of the Federation Council and Vice Chairman of the Federation Council
- organizes the work of the Chamber and conducts its meetings;
- coordinates the work of the committees and commissions of the Federation Council;
- aiming for preliminary consideration by the committees of the House in accordance with the matters within their jurisdiction approved by the State Duma draft laws of the Russian Federation on amendments to the Constitution of the Russian Federation, federal constitutional laws passed by the State Duma of the federal laws and draft laws, amendments to draft laws developed by the Committee, Commission of the Federation Council, a member of the Federation Council, which is supposed to submit to the State Duma in the exercise of the right of legislative initiative of the Federation Council;
- directs the Public Chamber of the Russian Federation on its request, documents and materials necessary for the public examination of draft laws of the Russian Federation on amendments to the Constitution of the Russian Federation, draft federal constitutional laws and federal laws (with the exception of materials containing information constituting state or other secrets protected by law )
- publish notices for general information on the laws of the Russian Federation on amendments to the Constitution of the Russian Federation;
- guides for consideration in the legislative (representative) bodies of state power of subjects of the Russian Federation adopted the laws of the Russian Federation on amendments to the Constitution of the Russian Federation;
- sent to the President of the Russian Federation for signing and official publication of the laws approved by the Federation Council of the Russian Federation on amendments to the Constitution of the Russian Federation, federal constitutional laws and federal laws;
- directs the State Duma rejected by the Federation Council of the Russian Federation draft laws on amendments to the Constitution of the Russian Federation, federal constitutional laws and federal laws;
- send to the committees, commissions of the Federation Council in accordance with the matters within their jurisdiction, as well as in the Legal Department of the Council of the Federation to prepare proposals legislative acts adopted by the Parliament of the Union State, the Interparliamentary Assembly of the Eurasian Economic Community, the model legislative acts adopted by the Interparliamentary Assembly of States - members of the Commonwealth Independent States, as well as projects such acts;
- represents the House in its relations with federal authorities, state authorities of the Russian Federation, local authorities, public associations, as well as with foreign parliaments, international organizations, state and public figures of foreign countries;
- participating in conciliation procedures used by the President of the Russian Federation in accordance with Part 1 of Article 85 of the Constitution of the Russian Federation to resolve disputes between federal authorities and the state authorities of the Russian Federation, as well as between the state authorities of the Russian Federation;
- coordinates the organization of the parliamentary hearings, "round tables" and other events held in the Federation Council;
- approves schedule of reception of citizens by members of committees, commissions of the Federation Council, and directs the other officials of the Federation Council for consideration by the individual and collective complaints of citizens received by the Federation Council
- solve other issues of organization of the Council of the Federation in accordance with these Rules and other regulations;
- the general management of the Federation Council and supervises his activities;
- after consultations with the Council Chamber of the structure of the Federation Council;
- claims personnel of the Federation Council;
- with the consent of the Chamber shall appoint and dismiss the Chief of Staff of the Federation Council, and on recommendation of the Head of the Federation Council appoints and dismisses the first deputy (First Deputy), Deputy Head of the Federation Council of the Federal Assembly of the Russian Federation and other employees Office of the Council of the Federation in accordance with the Regulations on the Administration of the Council of Federation of the Federal Assembly of the Russian Federation;
- signed certificate to the badge of honor of the Council of Federation of the Federal Assembly of the Russian Federation "For merits in development of parliamentarism";
- signs and hands Diploma of the Federation Council of the Federal Assembly of the Russian Federation;
- by the Board of the Chamber shall sign and send to the President of the Russian Federation submission to award the Federation Council members and employees of the Federation Council state awards;
- sign and send invitations to members of the House of Government of the Russian Federation and other persons in the manner prescribed in Article 77 of this Regulation;
- He headed the planning activities of the Chamber;
- signed by the authorized representative of the Federation Council in the proceedings before the Constitutional Court of the Russian Federation;
- appoint from among the members of the Federation Council of plenipotentiary representatives of the Federation Council of the State Duma, the Government of the Russian Federation, the Constitutional Court of the Russian Federation, the Supreme Court of the Russian Federation, the Supreme Arbitration Court of the Russian Federation, the Accounts Chamber of the Russian Federation Prosecutor General's Office of the Russian Federation, the Central Election Commission of the Russian Federation, Ministry of Justice of the Russian Federation, the Public Chamber of the Russian Federation, as well as the authorized representative of the Federation Council for Cooperation with the Commissioner for Human Rights in the Russian Federation;
- approves instruction on records management in the Federation Council, and instructions for work with citizens in the Federation Council;
- gives orders of committees and commissions of the Federation Council;
- He gives orders to other officials of the Federation Council.

== See also ==
- Chairman of the State Duma
- List of Deputy Chairmen of the Federation Council of Russia
