= Vladimir Shumeyko =

Russian politician (born 1945)

- Владимир Шумейко
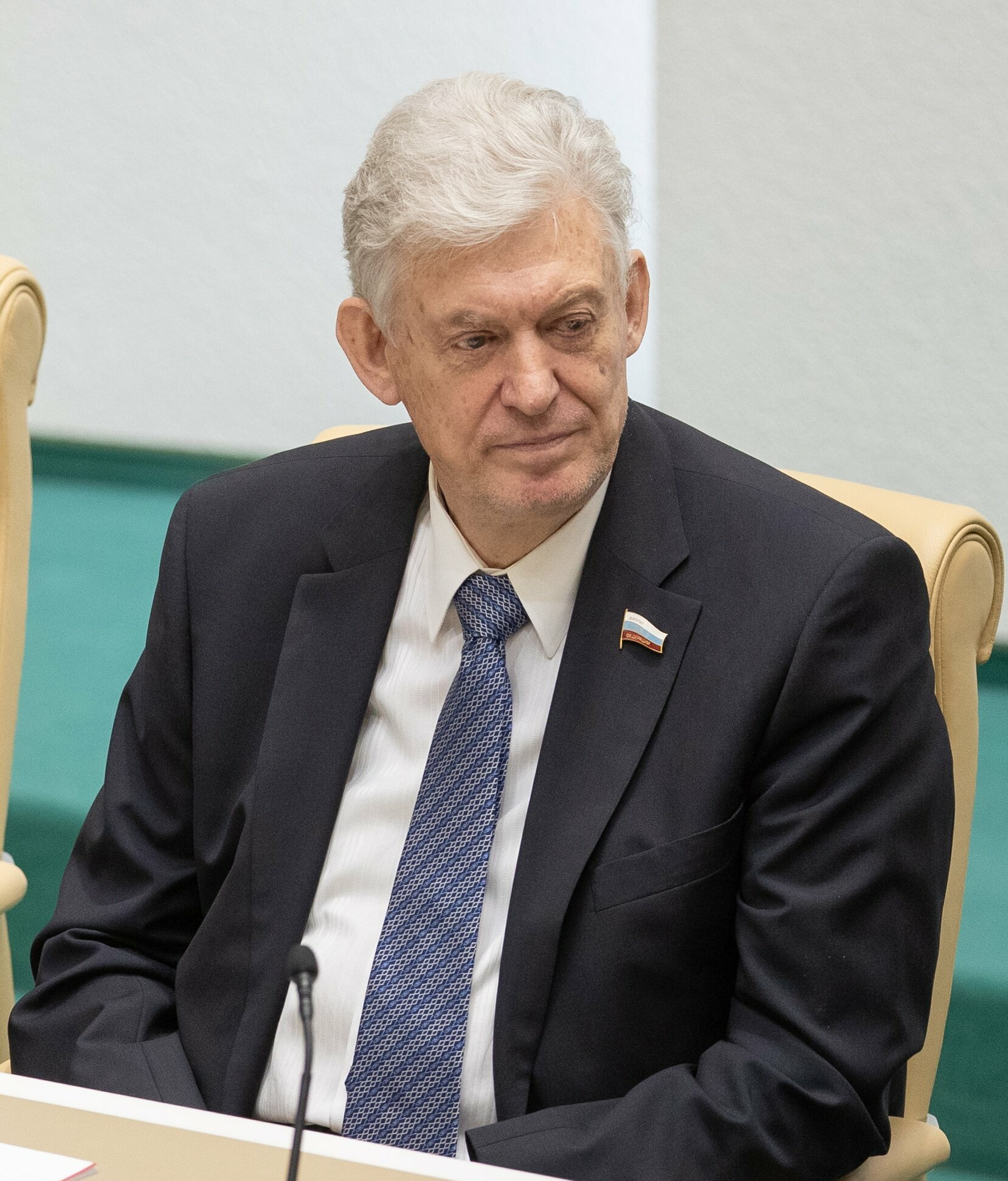
- Shumeyko in 2018

1st Chairman of the Federation Council
- In office 13 January 1994 – 23 January 1996
- Preceded by: Office established
- Succeeded by: Yegor Stroyev

First Deputy Prime Minister
- In office 2 June 1992 – 12 December 1993
- Prime Minister: Boris Yeltsin (extraordinary); Yegor Gaidar (acting); Viktor Chernomyrdin
- Preceded by: Gennady Burbulis
- Succeeded by: Oleg Soskovets

Minister of Press and Mass Media
- In office 5 October 1993 – 22 December 1993
- President: Boris Yeltsin
- Prime Minister: Viktor Chernomyrdin
- Preceded by: Mikhail Fedotov
- Succeeded by: Office disestablished

Deputy Chairman of the Supreme Soviet
- In office 1 November 1991 – 1 July 1992
- Chairman: Ruslan Khasbulatov
- Preceded by: Svetlana Goryacheva
- Succeeded by: Nikolay Ryabov

Personal details
- Born: 10 February 1945 (age 81) Rostov-on-Don, Rostov Oblast, Russian SFSR, Soviet Union
- Party: CPSU
- Education: Kuban Polytechnic Institute

Vladimir Filippovich Shumeyko (also spelled Shumeiko) (Russian: Влади́мир Фили́ппович Шуме́йко; born 10 February 1945) is a Russian political figure.

In November 1991, Vladimir Shumeyko was appointed deputy chairman of the Supreme Soviet of the Russian Federation. In May 1992, Shumeyko, leading a parliamentary delegation, visited Damascus. In June 1992, he became a first deputy prime minister in the Cabinet of Boris Yeltsin and Yegor Gaidar and held that office during the Russian constitutional crisis of 1993. In August 1992, Shumeyko announced that $1 billion of foreign investment was obtained for Russia. Shumeyko held the post of the chairman of the Federation Council of the Federal Assembly of Russia between January 1994 and January 1996.
