= List of members of the 1st Russian State Duma =

Members of the 1st Russian State Duma
2nd	→

Overview
- Term: 11 January 1994 – 22 December 1995
- Election: 12 December 1993

Elections to the 1st Russian State Duma were held on 12 December 1993. 449 members were elected, 225 of them by party lists and 224 in single-member constituencies.

== By constituencies ==
Region	Constituency	Name	Party	Faction
Adygea	1. Adygea	Valentin Lednev	Independent	Stability
Bashkortostan	2. Baymak	Akhmetgali Galiyev	Independent	Agrarian Party
Bashkortostan	3. Birsk	Ramil Mirsayev	Independent	Agrarian Party
Bashkortostan	4. Kalininsky	Alexander Arinin	PRES	PRES
Bashkortostan	5. Kirovsky	Rais Asayev	Agrarian Party	Agrarian Party
Bashkortostan	6. Sterlitamak	Yuriy Utkin	Independent	New Regional Policy
Bashkortostan	7. Tuymazy	Zifkat Sayetgaliyev	Independent	Russia
Buryatia	8. Buryatia	Nikolay Kondakov	Independent	Agrarian Party
(Altai Republic) Altai Rep.	9. Gorny Altai	Mikhail Gnezdilov	Independent	New Regional Policy
Dagestan	10. Buynaksk	Gamid Gamidov	Independent	New Regional Policy
Dagestan	11. Makhachkala	Magomed Tolboyev	Independent	New Regional Policy
Ingushetia	12. Ingushetia	Alexandra Ochirova	Independent	Russia
Kabardino-Balkaria	13. Kabardino-Balkaria	Khachim Karmokov (Note: Appointed auditor of the Accounts Chamber of Russia. Seat vacant from 11 May 1995.)	Independent	New Regional Policy
Kalmykia	14. Kalmykia	Bembya Khulkhachiyev	Independent	New Regional Policy
Karachay-Cherkessia	15. Karachay-Cherkessia	Azret Akbayev	Independent	Stability
Karelia	16. Karelia	Ivan Chukhin	Choice of Russia	Choice of Russia
(Komi Republic) Komi	17. Pechora	Valery Maksimov	Independent	New Regional Policy
(Komi Republic) Komi	18. Syktyvkar	Nikolay Gen	Independent	Russian Way
Mari El	19. Mari El	Anatoly Popov	PRES	Independent
Mordovia	20. Mordovia	Vladimir Kartashov	Communist Party	Communist Party
(Sakha Republic) Sakha (Yakutia)	21. Yakutia	Yegor Zhirkov	Independent	New Regional Policy
North Ossetia-Alania	22. North Ossetia	Alexander Dzasokhov	Independent	New Regional Policy
Tatarstan (Note: All five members elected on 13 March 1994.)	23. Almetyevsk	Gennady Yegorov	Independent	Russia
Tatarstan	24. Moskovsky	Oleg Morozov	Independent	New Regional Policy
Tatarstan	25. Naberezhnye Chelny	Vladimir Altukhov	Independent	New Regional Policy
Tatarstan	26. Nizhnekamsk	Gabdulvakhit Bagautdinov	Independent	New Regional Policy
Tatarstan	27. Privolzhsky	Valentin Mikhailov	Choice of Russia	Choice of Russia
Tuva	28. Tuva	Kara-Kys Arakchaa	Independent	New Regional Policy
Udmurtia	29. Izhevsk	Alexey Krasnykh	PRES	Russia
Udmurtia	30. Udmurtia	Mikhail Vasilyev	Independent	New Regional Policy
Khakassia	31. Khakassia	Mikhail Mityukov	Choice of Russia	Choice of Russia
Chechnya (Note: Election was not held due to Chechnya's de facto secession from Russia.)	32. Chechnya			
Chuvashia	33. Kanash	Valentin Agafonov	Independent	Agrarian Party
Chuvashia	34. Cheboksary	Nadezhda Bikalova	Independent	New Regional Policy
Altai Krai	35. Barnaul	Aleksey Sarychev	RDDR	Choice of Russia
Altai Krai	36. Biysk	Pavel Yefremov	Independent	Agrarian Party
Altai Krai	37. Rubtsovsk	Vladimir Bessarabov	Independent	New Regional Policy
Altai Krai	38. Slavgorod	Sergey Opyonyshev	Agrarian Party	Agrarian Party
Krasnodar Krai	39. Armavir	Anatoly Dolgopolov	Independent	Agrarian Party
Krasnodar Krai	40. Kanevskaya	Anatoly Kochegura	Independent	Agrarian Party
Krasnodar Krai	41. Krasnodar	Sergey Glotov	Independent	Russian Way
Krasnodar Krai	42. Novorossiysk	Nina Zatsepina	Independent	Russian Way
Krasnodar Krai	43. Prikubansky	Pyotr Kiriy	Agrarian Party	Agrarian Party
Krasnodar Krai	44. Tikhoretsk	Nadezhda Verveyko	Independent	Russian Way
Krasnodar Krai	45. Tuapse	Vadim Boyko	Independent	Independent
Krasnoyarsk Krai	46. Achinsk	Vasily Zhurko	Liberal Democratic Party	Liberal Democratic Party
Krasnoyarsk Krai	47. Yeniseysky	Valery Kolmako	Independent	New Regional Policy
Krasnoyarsk Krai	48. Kansk	Anatoly Yaroshenko	Agrarian Party	Agrarian Party
Krasnoyarsk Krai	49. Krasnoyarsk	Vladimir Tikhonov	Independent	Russian Way
Primorsky Krai	50. Arsenyev	Valery Nesterenko	Independent	Stability
Primorsky Krai	51. Vladivostok	Mikhail Glubokovsky	Yavlinsky-Boldyrev-Lukin	Yabloko
Primorsky Krai	52. Ussuriysk	Igor Ustinov	Independent	Union of December 12
Stavropol Krai	53. Georgiyevsk	Viktor Borodin	Independent	Russia
Stavropol Krai	54. Mineralnye Vody	Vladimir Katrenko	Independent	Russia
Stavropol Krai	55. Petrovsky	Vasily Moroz	Agrarian Party	Agrarian Party
Stavropol Krai	56. Stavropol	Alexander Traspov	Independent	Union of December 12
Khabarovsk Krai	57. Komsomolsk-na-Amure	Vladimir Baryshev	Independent	Choice of Russia
Khabarovsk Krai	58. Khabarovsk	Valery Podmasko	Independent	Stability
Amur Oblast	59. Blagoveshchensk	Andrey Zakharov	Civic Union	Independent
Arkhangelsk Oblast	60. Arkhangelsk	Sergey Shulgin	Civic Union	PRES
Arkhangelsk Oblast	61. Kotlas	Alexander Piskunov	Independent	New Regional Policy
Astrakhan Oblast	62. Astrakhan	Vladislav Vinogradov	Independent	Union of December 12
Belgorod Oblast	63. Belgorod	Viktor Berestovoy	Independent	Agrarian Party
Belgorod Oblast	64. Novy Oskol	Boris Zamay	Independent	Union of December 12
Bryansk Oblast	65. Bryansk	Anatoly Vorontsov	Agrarian Party	Agrarian Party
Bryansk Oblast	66. Pochep	Oleg Shenkaryov	Communist Party	Communist Party
Vladimir Oblast	67. Vladimir	Gennady Churkin	Agrarian Party	Agrarian Party
Vladimir Oblast	68. Sudogda	Yevgeny Buchenkov	Agrarian Party	Agrarian Party
Volgograd Oblast	69. Volzhsky	Valery Nikitin	Independent	New Regional Policy
Volgograd Oblast	70. Krasnoarmeysky	Vladimir Kosykh	Independent	Russia
Volgograd Oblast	71. Mikhaylovka	Vladimir Plotnikov	Independent	Agrarian Party
Volgograd Oblast	72. Central	Igor Lukashyov	Yavlinsky-Boldyrev-Lukin	Yabloko
Vologda Oblast	73. Vologda	Tamara Leta	Agrarian Party	Agrarian Party
Vologda Oblast	74. Cherepovets	Vasily Kovalyov	Independent	Union of December 12
Voronezh Oblast	75. Anna	Nikolay Parinov	Independent	Russia
Voronezh Oblast	76. Levoberezhny	Viktor Davydkin	Choice of Russia	Choice of Russia
Voronezh Oblast	77. Pavlovsk	Pyotr Matyashov	Independent	Russia
Voronezh Oblast	78. Pravoberezhny	Igor Muravyov	Civic Union	Russia
Ivanovo Oblast	79. Ivanovo	Viktor Zelyonkin	Choice of Russia	Choice of Russia
Ivanovo Oblast	80. Kineshma	Sergey Zenkin	Independent	PRES
Irkutsk Oblast	81. Angarsk	Viktor Mashinsky	Independent	New Regional Policy
Irkutsk Oblast	82. Bratsk	Vitaly Shuba	Independent	New Regional Policy
Irkutsk Oblast	83. Irkutsk	Yury Ten	Independent	PRES
Irkutsk Oblast	84. Tulun	Anatoliy Turusin	Agrarian Party	Agrarian Party
Kaliningrad Oblast	85. Kaliningrad	Yury Voyevoda	RDDR	Stability
Kaluga Oblast	86. Dzerzhinsky	Pavel Burdukov	Agrarian Party	Agrarian Party
Kaluga Oblast	87. Kaluga	Ella Pamfilova	Choice of Russia	Choice of Russia
Kamchatka Oblast	88. Kamchatka	Aivars Lezdiņš	Independent	Independent
Kemerovo Oblast	89. Anzhero-Sudzhensk	Galina Parshintseva	Independent	Women of Russia
Kemerovo Oblast	90. Kemerovo	Sergey Burkov	Independent	New Regional Policy
Kemerovo Oblast	91. Novokuznetsk	Viktor Medikov	Independent	New Regional Policy
Kemerovo Oblast	92. Prokopyevsk	Nina Volkova	Independent	Russia
Kirov Oblast	93. Kirov	Mikhail Vakulenko	Liberal Democratic Party	Liberal Democratic Party
Kirov Oblast	94. Sovetsk	Yegor Agafonov	Independent	Stability
Kostroma Oblast	95. Kostroma	Adrian Puzanovsky	Dignity and Charity	New Regional Policy
Kurgan Oblast	96. Eastern	Nikolay Bezborodov	Independent	Russian Way
Kurgan Oblast	97. Western	Gennady Kalistratov	Independent	Agrarian Party
Kursk Oblast	98. Kursk	Alexander Mikhaylov	Communist Party	Communist Party
Kursk Oblast	99. Lgov	Aleksandr Potapenko	Independent	Communist Party
Leningrad Oblast	100. Volkhov	Yury Sokolov	Independent	Agrarian Party
Leningrad Oblast	101. Vsevolozhsk	Yevgeny Fyodorov	RDDR	Stability
Lipetsk Oblast	102. Yelets	Viktor Repkin	Independent	Agrarian Party
Lipetsk Oblast	103. Lipetsk	Tamara Chepasova	Women of Russia	Women of Russia
Magadan Oblast	104. Magadan	Yevgeny Kokorev	Independent	New Regional Policy
Moscow Oblast	105. Dmitrov	Artur Muravyov	Independent	New Regional Policy
Moscow Oblast	106. Istra	Vladimir Gaboyev	Yavlinsky-Boldyrev-Lukin	Yabloko
Moscow Oblast	107. Kolomna	Sergey Skorochkin (Note: Assassinated on 1 February 1995.)	Independent	Liberal Democratic Party
Moscow Oblast	107. Kolomna	German Titov (Note: Elected on 14 May 1995.)	Independent	Communist Party
Moscow Oblast	108. Lyubertsy	Anatoly Guskov	BRNI	Stability
Moscow Oblast	109. Mytishchi	Andrey Aizderdzis (Note: Assassinated on 24 April 1994.)	Independent	New Regional Policy
Moscow Oblast	109. Mytishchi	Sergey Mavrodi (Note: Elected on 30 October 1994, expelled on 6 October 1995.)	Independent	Independent
Moscow Oblast	110. Noginsk	Nikolay Stolyarov	Independent	New Regional Policy
Moscow Oblast	111. Odintsovo	Vladimir Lukin	Yavlinsky-Boldyrev-Lukin	Yabloko
Moscow Oblast	112. Orekhovo-Zuyevo	Vladimir Kvasov	Independent	New Regional Policy
Moscow Oblast	113. Podolsk	Grigory Bondarev	Yavlinsky-Boldyrev-Lukin	Yabloko
Moscow Oblast	114. Shchyolkovo	Vladimir Zhirinovsky	Liberal Democratic Party	Liberal Democratic Party
Murmansk Oblast	115. Monchegorsk	Vladimir Manannikov	Choice of Russia	Choice of Russia
Murmansk Oblast	116. Murmansk	Andrei Kozyrev	Choice of Russia	Choice of Russia
Nizhny Novgorod Oblast	117. Avtozavodsky	Alexander Tsapin	Independent	Yabloko
Nizhny Novgorod Oblast	118. Arzamas	Sergey Voronov	Independent	Stability
Nizhny Novgorod Oblast	119. Dzerzhinsk	Mikhail Seslavinsky	Independent	Stability
Nizhny Novgorod Oblast	120. Kanavinsky	Vadim Bulavinov	Independent	Stability
Nizhny Novgorod Oblast	121. Semyonov	Tatyana Chertoritskaya	Independent	Stability
Nizhny Novgorod Oblast	122. Sergach	Yevgeny Bushmin	Independent	Union of December 12
Novgorod Oblast	123. Novgorod	Oleg Ochin	PRES	New Regional Policy
Novosibirsk Oblast	124. Barabinsk	Nikolay Kharitonov	Agrarian Party	Agrarian Party
Novosibirsk Oblast	125. Zavodskoy	Ivan Anichkin	Dignity and Charity	Russian Way
Novosibirsk Oblast	126. Zayeltsovsky	Vasily Lipitsky	Civic Union	Independent
Novosibirsk Oblast	127. Iskitim	Ivan Starikov (Note: Appointed deputy Minister of Economy. Seat vacant from 11 May 1995.)	Choice of Russia	Choice of Russia
Omsk Oblast	128. Bolsherechye	Oleg Zharov	Independent	Russia
Omsk Oblast	129. Omsk	Viktor Lotkov	Independent	Stability
Omsk Oblast	130. Central	Sergey Baburin	Independent	Russian Way
Orenburg Oblast	131. Buzuluk	Alexey Chernyshyov	Agrarian Party	Agrarian Party
Orenburg Oblast	132. Orenburg	Tamara Zlotnikova	Yavlinsky-Boldyrev-Lukin	Yabloko
Orenburg Oblast	133. Orsk	Vladimir Volkov	Independent	Communist Party
Oryol Oblast	134. Oryol	Alexander Voropayev	Independent	New Regional Policy
Penza Oblast	135. Zheleznodorozhny	Valery Goryachev	Yavlinsky-Boldyrev-Lukin	Yabloko
Penza Oblast	136. Penza	Viktor Ilyukhin	Communist Party	Communist Party
Perm Oblast	137. Berezniki	Vladimir Kravtsov	Independent	Stability
Perm Oblast	138. Kungur	Mikhail Putilov	Civic Union	Stability
Perm Oblast	139. Leninsky	Vladimir Zelenin	Independent	Communist Party
Perm Oblast	140. Sverdlovsky	Viktor Pokhmelkin	Choice of Russia	Choice of Russia
Pskov Oblast	141. Pskov	Yevgeny Mikhailov	Liberal Democratic Party	Liberal Democratic Party
Rostov Oblast	142. Volgodonsk	Sergey Ponomaryov	Independent	Agrarian Party
Rostov Oblast	143. Kamensk-Shakhtinsky	Boris Danchenko	Independent	Agrarian Party
Rostov Oblast	144. Rostov-Pervomaysky	Alla Amelina	Independent	Choice of Russia
Rostov Oblast	145. Rostov-Sovetsky	Igor Bratishchev	Communist Party	Communist Party
Rostov Oblast	146. Taganrog	Yury Rodionov	Independent	New Regional Policy
Rostov Oblast	147. Shakhty	Ivan Bespalov	Independent	Communist Party
Ryazan Oblast	148. Ryazan	Konstantin Laykam	Civic Union	Stability
Ryazan Oblast	149. Shilovo	Sergey Yenkov	Independent	Agrarian Party
Samara Oblast	150. Novokuybyshevsk	Galina Gusarova	Women of Russia	Russia
Samara Oblast	151. Promyshlenny	Nikolay Chukanov	Independent	New Regional Policy
Samara Oblast	152. Samara	Lyubov Rozhkova	Communist Party	New Regional Policy
Samara Oblast	153. Syzran	Yevgeny Gusarov	Independent	New Regional Policy
Samara Oblast	154. Tolyatti	Vyacheslav Smirnov	RDDR	New Regional Policy
Saratov Oblast	155. Balakovo	Alexander Sergeyenkov	Independent	Choice of Russia
Saratov Oblast	156. Balashov	Andrey Dorovskikh	Liberal Democratic Party	Liberal Democratic Party
Saratov Oblast	157. Saratov	Anatoly Gordeyev	Independent	Communist Party
Saratov Oblast	158. Engels	Nikolay Lysenko	Independent	Independent
Sakhalin Oblast	159. Sakhalin	Boris Tretyak	Independent	New Regional Policy
Sverdlovsk Oblast	160. Artyomovsky	Tamara Tokareva	Agrarian Party	Agrarian Party
Sverdlovsk Oblast	161. Verkh-Isetsky	Larisa Mishustina	Choice of Russia	Choice of Russia
Sverdlovsk Oblast	162. Kamensk-Uralsky	Sergey Mikheyev	Independent	New Regional Policy
Sverdlovsk Oblast	163. Nizhny Tagil	Artur Veyer	Independent	New Regional Policy
Sverdlovsk Oblast	164. Ordzhonikidzevsky	Yury Brusnitsyn (Note: Resigned on 22 February 1995.)	Independent	New Regional Policy
Sverdlovsk Oblast	165. Pervouralsk	Leonid Nekrasov	Independent	Stability
Sverdlovsk Oblast	166. Serov	Andrey Selivanov	Independent	Union of December 12
Smolensk Oblast	167. Vyazma	Vyacheslav Balalayev	Agrarian Party	Agrarian Party
Smolensk Oblast	168. Smolensk	Anatoly Lukyanov	Communist Party	Communist Party
Tambov Oblast	169. Michurinsk	Aleksey Ponomaryov	Communist Party	Communist Party
Tambov Oblast	170. Tambov	Tamara Pletnyova	Communist Party	Communist Party
Tver Oblast	171. Bezhetsk	Vladimir Bayunov	Independent	Communist Party
Tver Oblast	172. Tver	Tatyana Astrakhankina	Communist Party	Communist Party
Tomsk Oblast	173. Tomsk Urban	Vladimir Bauer	Choice of Russia	Choice of Russia
Tomsk Oblast	174. Tomsk Rural	Stepan Sulakshin	Choice of Russia	Democratic Party
Tula Oblast	175. Novomoskovsk	Vladimir Vasilyov	Independent	New Regional Policy
Tula Oblast	176. Tula	Eduard Pashchenko	Choice of Russia	Choice of Russia
Tula Oblast	177. Shchyokino	Yelena Bogdanova	Agrarian Party	Agrarian Party
Tyumen Oblast	178. Ishim	Stanislav Shkuro	Independent	New Regional Policy
Tyumen Oblast	179. Tyumen	Aleksandr Trushnikov	Independent	Stability
Ulyanovsk Oblast	180. Leninsky	Valery Sychyov	Independent	Independent
Ulyanovsk Oblast	181. Zasviyazhsky	Lyudmila Zhadanova	Independent	Stability
Chelyabinsk Oblast	182. Zlatoust	Vladimir Grigoriadi	KEDR	Independent
Chelyabinsk Oblast	183. Kalininsky	Vladimir Golovlyov	Choice of Russia	Choice of Russia
Chelyabinsk Oblast	184. Kyshtym	Aleksandr Kushnar	Choice of Russia	Choice of Russia
Chelyabinsk Oblast	185. Magnitogorsk	Alexander Pochinok	Choice of Russia	Choice of Russia
Chelyabinsk Oblast	186. Sovetsky	Vladimir Utkin	Civic Union	Russia
Chita Oblast	187. Borzya	Vladimir Surenkov	Independent	New Regional Policy
Chita Oblast	188. Chita	Sergey Markidonov	Independent	Stability
Yaroslavl Oblast	189. Kirovsky	Yevgenia Tishkovskaya	Independent	New Regional Policy
Yaroslavl Oblast	190. Rybinsk	Anatoly Greshnevikov	Independent	Russian Way
Moscow	191. Babushkinsky	Yuly Nisnevich	Choice of Russia	Choice of Russia
Moscow	192. Varshavsky	Sergey Kovalyov	Choice of Russia	Choice of Russia
Moscow	193. Western	Georgy Zadonsky	Choice of Russia	Choice of Russia
Moscow	194. Kashirsky	Irina Hakamada	Independent	Union of December 12
Moscow	195. Medvedkovo	Viktor Mironov	Independent	Stability
Moscow	196. Nagatinsky	Andrey Volkov	Independent	Stability
Moscow	197. Perovo	Aleksandr Osovtsov	Independent	Choice of Russia
Moscow	198. Preobrazhensky	Alexander Zhukov	Dignity and Charity	Union of December 12
Moscow	199. Northern	Alla Gerber	Independent	Choice of Russia
Moscow	200. North West	Yury Vlasov	Independent	Independent
Moscow	201. Universitetsky	Aleksandr Braginsky	RDDR	Union of December 12
Moscow	202. Central	Artyom Tarasov	Independent	Stability
Moscow	203. Sheremetyevo	Andrey Makarov	Choice of Russia	Union of December 12
Moscow	204. South West	Pavel Medvedev	Independent	Choice of Russia
Moscow	205. South East	Boris Fyodorov	Choice of Russia	Union of December 12
Saint Petersburg	206. Western	Vitaly Savitsky (Note: Died on 9 December 1995.)	Choice of Russia	Choice of Russia
Saint Petersburg	207. Northern	Mikhail Kiselyov	Independent	Independent
Saint Petersburg	208. North East	Yuly Rybakov	Independent	Choice of Russia
Saint Petersburg	209. North West	Aleksey Aleksandrov	Independent	Stability
Saint Petersburg	210. Central	Alexander Nevzorov	Independent	Russian Way
Saint Petersburg	211. Southern	Aleksandr Yegorov	Independent	New Regional Policy
Saint Petersburg	212. South East	Sergey Popov	Choice of Russia	Stability
Saint Petersburg	213. South West	Mark Goryachev	Civic Union	PRES
Jewish AO	214. Birobidzhan	Anatoly Biryukov	Independent	Agrarian Party
Agin-Buryat AO	215. Agin-Buryat	Bair Zhamsuyev	Independent	New Regional Policy
Komi-Permyak AO	216. Komi-Permyak	Anna Vlasova	Independent	Women of Russia
Koryak AO	217. Koryak	Mikhail Popov	Independent	Stability
Nenets AO	218. Nenets	Artur Chilingarov	Civic Union	New Regional Policy
Taymyr AO	219. Taymyr	Aleksandr Vasilyev	Independent	Yabloko
Ust-Orda Buryat AO	220. Ust-Orda Buryat	Sergey Boskholov	Independent	PRES
Khanty-Mansi AO	221. Nizhnevartovsk	Vladimir Medvedev	Independent	New Regional Policy
Khanty-Mansi AO	222. Khanty-Mansiysk	Yeremey Aypin	Choice of Russia	Choice of Russia
Chukotka AO	223. Chukotka	Tatyana Nesterenko	Independent	New Regional Policy
Evenk AO	224. Evenk	Viktor Gayulsky	Independent	Stability
Yamalo-Nenets AO	225. Yamalo-Nenets	Vladimir Goman	Independent	New Regional Policy

== By party lists ==
Members elected both by party lists and by constituencies are not listed.

=== Agrarian Party ===
1. Mikhail Lapshin
2. Aleksandr Davydov
3. Alexander Zaveryukha
4. Aleksandr Nazarchuk
5. Magomedtagir Abdulbasirov (Note: Appointed as Deputy Minister of Agriculture and Food on 22 July 1994.) → Vasily Krylov
6. Igor Klochkov
7. Ivan Rybkin, Chairman of the State Duma
8. Gennady Dyudyayev
9. Sergey Bystrov
10. Nikolay Kotov
11. Vladimir Isakov
12. Gennady Medentsov
13. Aleksandr Mikhaylov
14. Andrey Popov
15. Gennady Kulik
16. Nikolay Ivanov (Note: Appointed auditor of the Accounts Chamber of Russia on 4 October 1995.) → Boris Khangeldyyev
17. Vasily Vershinin
18. Vladimir Naumov
19. Vitaly Gukov
20. Nikolay Sukhoy
21. Pyotr Ivantayev (Note: Declined from membership on 4 January 1994, a week before Duma's first meeting.) → Vyacheslav Mikulin

=== Communist Party ===
1. Gennady Zyuganov
2. Vitaly Sevastyanov
3. Valentin Chikin
4. Valentin Martemyanov (Note: Died on 5 November 1994.) → Vladimir Leonchev
5. Anatoly Ionov
6. Gennady Seleznyov
7. Vladimir Semago
8. Kazbek Tsiku
9. Yuri Sevenard
10. Viktor Zorkaltsev
11. Valentin Kovalyov
12. Oleg Mironov
13. Yevgeny Krasnitsky
14. Aleksandr Zaytsev
15. Yury Ivanov
16. Ruslan Gostev
17. Vladimir Bokov
18. Valentin Nikitin
19. Yevgeny Kosterin
20. Viktor Shevelukha
21. Vadim Filimonov
22. Sergey Reshulsky
23. Nikolay Bindyukov
24. Yury Leonov
25. Leonid Petrovsky
26. Aleksandr Frolov
27. Nikolay Pyatchits (Note: Died on 31 March 1994.) → Vladimir Frolov
28. Lyubov Oleynik
29. Alevtina Aparina
30. Viktor Kosenko → Tamara Gudima
31. Tatyana Seletkova → Nikolay Goncharov

=== Yavlinsky-Boldyrev-Lukin bloc ===
1. Grigory Yavlinsky
2. Aleksey Mikhaylov
3. Mikhail Zadornov
4. Sergey Ivanenko
5. Aleksey Melnikov
6. Tatyana Yarygina
7. Viktor Sheynis
8. Nikolay Petrakov
9. Vyacheslav Igrunov
10. Anatoly Adamishin (Note: Resigned on 11 May 1994.) → Sergey Mitrokhin
11. Igor Yakovenko
12. Anatoly Golov
13. Valery Borshchyov
14. Pyotr Shelishch
15. Vladimir Averchev
16. Ivan Grachyov
17. Oksana Dmitriyeva
18. Vyacheslav Shostakovsky
19. Yevgeny Ambartsumov (Note: Resigned on 8 July 1994.) → Alexei Arbatov
20. Vladimir Lysenko

=== Choice of Russia ===
1. Yegor Gaidar
2. Anatoly Chubais
3. Dmitry Volkogonov (Note: Died on 6 December 1995.)
4. Sergey Filatov → Aleksandr Minzhurenko
5. Aleksey Yemelyanov
6. Mikhail Poltoranin
7. Pavel Bunich
8. Gennady Burbulis
9. Boris Zolotukhin
10. Pyotr Aven → Rasid Ismagilov
11. Aleksey Golovkov
12. Yuli Gusman
13. Arkady Murashyov
14. Sergei Yushenkov
15. Vasily Selyunin (Note: Died on 27 August 1994.) → Lev Ponomaryov
16. Nikolay Vorontsov
17. Andrey Nuykin
18. Gleb Yakunin
19. Mikhail Molostvov
20. Aleksandr Aulov
21. Ilya Zaslavskiy
22. Valentin Tatarchuk
23. Vladimir Gritsan
24. Anatoly Shabad
25. Boris Titenko
26. Kirill Ignatyev (Note: Resigned on 5 April 1995.) → Leonid Radzikhovsky
27. Anton Fyodorov → Mark Feygin
28. Viktor Danilov-Danilyan
29. Grigory Tomchin
30. Vladimir Tetelmin
31. Bela Denisenko
32. Vladimir Yuzhakov
33. Gennady Alekseyev
34. Olga Zastrozhnaya → Georgy Orlanov
35. Andrey Generalov
36. Yury Kuznetsov → Anatoly Yushchenko
37. Yevgeny Sidorov
38. Mikhail Danilov
39. Boris Saltykov
40. Vladimir Ryzhkov

=== Democratic Party ===
1. Nikolay Travkin
2. Stanislav Govorukhin
3. Oleg Bogomolov
4. Nikolay Fyodorov (Note: Took office as president of Chuvashia on 21 January 1994.) → Yevgeny Malkin
5. Sergey Glazyev
6. Sergey Zapolsky
7. Valentin Kotlyar
8. Nikolay Tropin
9. Irina Zubkevich
10. Viktor Talanov
11. Aleksey Leushkin
12. German Karelin
13. Yury Yakovlev
14. Feliks Pashennykh

=== Liberal Democratic Party ===
1. Viktor Kobelev
2. Vyacheslav Marychev
3. Vladimir Ivanov
4. Aleksey Mitrofanov
5. Stanislav Zhebrovsky
6. Vladimir Gvozdaryov
7. Aleksandr Vengerovsky
8. Sergey Abeltsev
9. Anatoly Kashpirovsky
10. Vladimir Gusev
11. Yury Buzov
12. Anatoly Sidorov
13. Vladimir Lisichkin
14. Mikhail Lemeshev
15. Oleg Finko
16. Aleksandr Kozyrev
17. Yury Kuznetsov
18. Vitaly Zhuravlev
19. Sergey Kalashnikov
20. Mikhail Sidorov
21. Vladimir Pchyolkin
22. Vladimir Borzyuk
23. Sergey Korobov
24. Viktor Kornienko
25. Yevgeny Loginov
26. Sergey Churkin
27. Sergey Sychyov
28. Mikhail Snezhkov
29. Vladimir Novikov
30. Tatyana Bulgakova
31. Eleonora Mitrofanova (Note: Appointed auditor of the Accounts Chamber of Russia.) → Anton Kireyev
32. Viktor Vishnyakov
33. Nikolay Astafyev
34. Yevgeny Ishchenko (Note: Appointed member of the Central Election Commission on 23 December 1994 without resigning as a deputy, which was allowed for the members of the 1st Duma. Resigned on 5 April 1995.) → Aleksandr Shipov
35. Viktor Ivanov
36. Yevgeny Tuinov
37. Boris Moiseyev
38. Vyacheslav Kiselyov
39. Yevgeny Bolshakov
40. Aleksandr Pronin
41. Vladimir Kostyutkin
42. Yury Ruda
43. Georgy Lukava, Father of the House
44. Viktor Ustinov
45. Konstantin Panferov
46. Stanislav Zarichansky
47. Aleksandr Filatov
48. Larisa Maksakova
49. Luiza Gagut
50. Edvard Zhuk (Note: Resigned on 17 May 1995.) → Sergey Mormin
51. Dmitry Skum
52. Aleksey Zvyagin
53. Aleksey Zuyev
54. Vadim Bolshakov
55. Nina Krivelskaya
56. Anatoly Kapustin
57. Mikhail Burlakov
58. Anatoly Moiseyev
59. Aleksey Vasilishin

=== Party of Russian Unity and Accord ===
1. Sergey Shakhray
2. Alexander Shokhin
3. Konstantin Zatulin
4. Yury Kalmykov
5. Valery Kirpichnikov
6. Gennady Melikyan
7. Vladimir Tumanov (Note: Elected judge of the Constitutional Court of Russia on 25 October 1994.) → Stanislav Polovnikov
8. Anatoly Sliva
9. Vyacheslav Nikonov
10. Vladimir Kozhemyakin
11. Vladimir Lepyokhin
12. Aleksandr Turbanov
13. Igor Shichanin
14. Konstantin Zuyev
15. Murad Kajlayev
16. Sergey Stankevich
17. Sergey Shapovalov
18. Irek Muksinov

=== Women of Russia ===
1. Alevtina Fedulova
2. Ekaterina Lakhova
3. Natalya Gundareva
4. Natalya Malakhatkina
5. Lyudmila Zavadskaya
6. Marina Dobrovolskaya
7. Galina Klimantova
8. Fanuza Arslanova
9. Antonina Zhilina
10. Irina Vybornova
11. Yelena Chepurnykh
12. Raisa Skripitsyna
13. Valentina Martynova
14. Yekaterina Popova (Note: Died on 29 July 1994. Seat remained vacant.)
15. Svetlana Orlova
16. Valentina Kozhukhova
17. Galina Chubkova
18. Larisa Babukh
19. Zhanna Lozinskaya
20. Irina Novitskaya
21. Lyudmila Markina → Nadezhda Remnyova (Note: Resigned on 4 February 1994.) → Maria Gaidash
