= Martemyanov =

Martemyanov (Russian: Мартемьянов) is a Russian surname. The feminine form is Martemyanova (Russian: Мартемьянова). Notable people with the surname include:

- Andrei Martemyanov (1963–2025), Soviet and Russian ice hockey player and coach
- Valentin Martemyanov (1932–1994), Russian politician, lawyer, and professor

== See also ==
- Martemyanovo, a rural locality in the Russian Kovrovsky District
