= Georgy Toloraya =

Russian diplomat

- Born: April 3, 1956; Moscow
- Education: Moscow State Institute of International Relations
- Awards: 1995 - Awarded personal diplomatic rank of Minister Extraordinary and Plenipotentiary 1997 - Awarded Honorary medal "850th Anniversary of Moscow" 2001 - Awarded by the Decree of the President of Russia by Honorary medal "100 years of Transsib Railway"
- Scientific career
- Fields: International relations
- Workplaces: Russian Academy of Sciences; Moscow State Institute of International Relations

Georgy Toloraya (born April 3, 1956) is a Russian diplomat, Executive Director of the Russian National Committee on BRICS research, Director of the Center of Russian Strategy in Asia, Institute of Economics Russian Academy of Sciences, visiting professor at the Higher School of Economics, Moscow and a professor for the Department of Oriental Studies at the Moscow State Institute of International Relations (MGIMO).

== Biography ==
Prof. Georgy Toloraya is a professional diplomat (rank of Minister) with decades-long experience in Asian affairs, having served two postings in North Korea (1977–80 and 1984-7), then in South Korea as a Deputy chief of the Russian Embassy (1993-8) and later as the senior Russian Foreign Ministry official (Deputy director-general) in charge of the Korean Peninsula (1998–2003). He later worked as the Consul General of Russia in Sydney, Australia (2003–2007).In 2019-2024 he was the member of the Panel of Experts, UN Security Council Committee established pursuant to SC Resolution 1718 (2006), Prior to that he worked for trade promotion agencies related to Asia. Prof. Toloraya pursued a successful scholarly career, having graduated from MGIMO (Moscow University of International Relations) in 1978, earning a PhD in 1984, Doctor of Economy degree in 1994 and a Full Professor degree in Oriental studies in 2002. He has published many articles and books on East Asia, collaborated as a part-time researcher with noted Russian academic institutes including the Institute of World Economy and International Relations (IMEMO), and teaches Asian politics at MGIMO and Higher School of Economics .

In 2007-2008 he was a visiting fellow at the Brookings Institution in Washington, DC.

== Major publications ==
More than 150 articles in Russian and international periodicals and academic journals published in Russia, USA, Republic of Korea, Hong-Kong, Japanp, EU etc.

- Social-economic strategy and economic situation of Indochina and DPR Korea: Western estimates - Moscow, 1983, IEWSS publishers, 86 pp.
- DPR Korea Economic Complex - Moscow, 1984, IEWSS publishers, 162 pp.
- Chapter «Economic policy» in «Democratic Peoples Republic of Korea. Policy and Economy» - Moscow, «Nauka» publishers, 1985.
- The World Map Series: DPR Korea (together with I.Bolshov) - Moscow, 1987, «Mysl» publishers, 133 pp.
- Foreign Economic Cooperation Strategy: DPR Korea's Economists’ Views. - Moscow, IEWSS publishers, 1988, 35 pp.
- The World Map Series: Republic of Korea - Moscow, 1991, «Mysl» publishers, 120 pp.
- Our Business Partners: Republic of Korea - Moscow, «International Relations» publishers (together with G.Voitolovsky, S.Diykov), 1991, 190 pp.
- Abstracts of ROK economy (together with M.Trigubenko) - «Nauka» publishers, Moscow, 1993 - 156 pp.
- Chapter: «Moscow and North Korea; the 1961 Treaty and After» in: «Russia in the East and Pacific Region», Seoul, 1994.
- Chapter «ROK: Market Creation Experience» in «Modern Civilized Market» - Moscow, 1995.
- Chapter: «Cultural Context of Globalisation Policy» - in. «ROK: Creation of Modern Society» - IMEMO/Korea Foundation, Moscow/Seoul, 1996.
- Chapter: «Crisis Prevention in Korea». -in: «Japan and Russia in Northeast Asia», Praeger, London, 1999
- Chapter: «Liberalization of Foreign Economic Relations in Korea: a Remedy or a Poison?» - in: «Korea in 1990-s: a new stage of Reforms» - IMEMO/Korea Foundation, Moscow/Seoul, 1999.
- Chapters: “Russia –South Korea, North Korea, Mongolia - In Search of Cooperation Model”-in: The Northeast Asia Trade, Investment and Technology Cooperation: Russian Perspective – IMEMO/Korea Foundation, Moscow/Seoul, 2000.
- Chapter: Korean Peninsula in the Regional Sub-system of International Relations: End of 20th – Beginning of 21st Century- In: Asia and the Pacific and Central Asia: the Contours of Security - MGIMO press, Moscow, 2002
- Political Systems of Two Korean States – MGIMO press, 2002, 120 pp.
- Chapter: Russia and North Korea – Ten Years Later. – In: The Future of North Korea / Ed.Tsuneo Akaha - L & NY, Routledge, 2002
- President Putin's Korea Policy- The Journal of East Asian Studies, Seoul, vol.17, N 1, 2003.
- Fifty years without War and without Peace-Moscow, IMEMO press, 2003-
- Editor.
- The Nucleus of the Problem. The Ways of Overcoming the Crisis on theKorean Peninsula.(together with A.Vorontsov, V.Novikov)- Moscow Carnegie Center, 2003, 22 pp.
- Overcoming the Korean Crisis: Short- and Long-Term Options and Implications by a Russian Perspective-International Journal of Korean Unification Studies, vol.12, N 2, 2003
- Chapter:In Search of a Solution to Korean Crisis: Regime Change or Regime Transformation –The North Korean Crisis and Beyond, Wellington, 2004
- Korean Peninsula: Russian Priorities (together with A.Vorontsov) –Russian Analytica, Moscow, Vol.3, Dec.2004.
- Chapter: “Russian Experience in Information Technology Cooperation with Two Koreas”.- Bytes and Bullets/Ed.by A.Mansourov, Honolulu, 2005
- Chapter: “Korean Security Dilemmas: a Russian Prospective. In: Hazel Smith (ed) Reconstituting Korean Security” (Tokyo: United Nations University, 2007).
- Chapter; “North Korea- an Experiment in Nuclear Prolifiration” (together with A.Vorontsov)- In: At the Nuclear Threshold/Ed. By Alexei Arbatov- Moscow, Carnegie Moscow Center, 2007

== Professional activity ==
Participation in conferences and seminars in Russia, USA, China, Republic of Korea, North Korea, Japan, Italy, Czechoslovakia, Mongolia, Australia, New Zealand etc. Member of the Board of Russian Association of Koreanologists, member of Dissertation Evaluation Committee at the Council of Studies of the Productive Forces of the Ministry of Economy of Russia and Russian Academy of Sciences. Senior Fellow of The Shandong University, China, visiting professor of SCO Economy and Trade Institute, Qingdao, China.

== Honors ==
- 1995 - Awarded personal diplomatic rank of Minister Extraordinary and Plenipotentiary
- 1997 - Awarded Honorary medal «850th Anniversary of Moscow»
- 2001 - Awarded by the Decree of the President of Russia by Honorary medal "100 years of Transsib Railway"

2024- Awarded by the MFA Honorary medal " For cooperation ".
