= Petr Topychkanov =

Russian researcher

Petr Topychkanov (born October 16, 1981) is a Russian researcher of South Asia, nuclear nonproliferation, arms control, and military industrial cooperation.

== Education ==
Petr Topychkanov received a Bachelor of Arts in South Asian Studies from the Institute of Practical Oriental Studies in 2003. He then attended the Institute of Asian and African Countries, Moscow State University, receiving a Master of Arts in South Asian Studies in 2006 and a Ph.D in 2009. His dissertation was about "Constructing the Status of Religious Minorities of South Asia in the Second Half of 20th and Beginning of 21st Centuries (Cases of India and Pakistan)."

== Work ==
Petr Topychkanov served in the 4th Guards Kantemirovskaya Tank Division, Russian Armed Forces from 2003 to 2004. He joined the Carnegie Moscow Center's Nonproliferation Program in 2006, when it was co-chaired by Rose Gottemoeller and Academician Alexei Arbatov. In 2009, Topychkanov worked as a senior researcher at the Center for International Security at the Institute of World Economy and International Relations of the Russian Academy of Sciences. In 2014, he joined the Center's Information Security Problems Group and became an expert at the Russian International Affairs Council. He is also a participant of the Program on Strategic Stability Evaluation at the Georgia Institute of Technology and an associate of the South and Central Asia Project at the York Centre for Asian Research.

In 2017 Topychkanov was included to the list of the 20 most influential think tank experts in the field of international relations and security in Twitter, according to the Elcano Royal Institute.

== Publications ==
- “Nuclear Weapons and Strategic Security in South Asia” (2011)
- “India’s Prospects in the Area of Ballistic Missile Defense: A Regional Security Perspective” (2012)
- “Russia and Pakistan: Shared Challenges and Common Opportunities” with Vladimir Moskalenko (2014)

Co-author of:

- “Nuclear Proliferation: New Technologies, Weapons, Treaties” (2009)
- “Outer Space: Weapons, Diplomacy, and Security” (2010)
- “World of Khaki: Armed Forces in the System of State Power” (2011)
- “Nuclear Reset: Arms Reduction and Nonproliferation” (2012)
- “Prospects of Engaging India and Pakistan in Nuclear Arms Limitations” (2012)
- “Missile Defense: Confrontation and Cooperation” (2013)
- “Alarming Contours of the Future: Russia and the World in 2020” (2015)
- “The New Military-Industrial Powers” (2016),

Petr Topychkanov’s articles are frequently published in the press, including Newsweek, India Today, Hindustan Times, Russian Vedomosti, Forbes, RBC Daily, and others.
