= Vladimir Frolov =

Vladimir Frolov may refer to:

- Vladimir Frolov (footballer) (born 1982), Russian professional football player
- Vladimir Frolov (general) (died 2022), Russian major general
- Vladimir Frolov (politician) (born 1946), Russian politician, actor, and former army officer
