= Arbatov =

Arbatov (masculine, Russian: Арбатов) or Arbatova (feminine, Russian: Арбатова) is a Russian surname. Notable people with the surname include:

- Alexei Arbatov (born 1951), Russian political scientist, academic, author and politician
- Georgy Arbatov (1923–2010), Soviet and Russian political scientist
- Maria Arbatova (born 1957), Russian novelist, playwright, journalist, talkshow host and politician
