= Vasily Selyunin =

Russian politician (1927–1994)

- Василий Селюнин

Member of the State Duma
- In office 11 January 1994 – 27 August 1994

Personal details
- Born: Vasily Selyunin; 30 December 1927 Fomintsy, Russia, Soviet Union
- Died: 27 August 1994 (aged 66) Moscow, Russia
- Party: Democratic Choice of Russia
- Spouse: Tatyana Andreyevna (1941-2007)
- Children: Lada (1966-2014), Dmitry

Vasily Illarionovich Selyunin (Russian: Василий Илларионович Селюнин; 30 December 1927 – 27 August 1994) was a Soviet and Russian opinion journalist, writer and public figure, influential during the perestroika period in the Soviet Union.

He had been the member of the member of the 1st Russian State Duma. He described his views as a liberal. He was a signatory of the Letter of Forty-Two. He died of cancer in 1994.
