= Maxim Petlin =

- Максим Петлин
- Petlin in a press conference in 2017

Member of Yekaterinburg City Duma
- In office 1 March 2009 – 8 September 2013

Personal details
- Born: 12 October 1973 Novokuznetsk, Soviet Union
- Party: Yabloko
- Education: Ural State University
- Occupation: politician, social activist

Maxim Anatolyevich Petlin (Russian: Максим Анатольевич Петлин; born October 12, 1973, in Novokuznetsk, Kemerovo Oblast, RSFSR, USSR) is a Russian politician. He is the incumbent chairman of the Sverdlovsk regional branch of the Yabloko party and a member of the party's federal bureau. He previously served as a deputy of the Yekaterinburg City Duma (5th convocation).

== Biography ==
He was born on October 12, 1973, in Novokuznetsk. In 1991, he graduated from the Krasnoyarsk Regional Physics and Mathematics Boarding School. After moving to Yekaterinburg, he graduated from the Faculty of Economics at Ural State University in 1996, specializing in economic theory. He has been active in the advertising and information business since 1996. In 2005, he participated in founding the Ural Guild of Advertising Producers, serving as chairman of the organization's Council in 2006 and 2007.

In 2009, he was elected Chairman of the Ural branch of the Yabloko party and became a deputy of the Yekaterinburg City Duma. He was one of the organizers of the "Strategy-31" campaign in Yekaterinburg, as well as various political protests and opposition rallies in the city.е In 2013, he lost his deputy seat as a result of criminal prosecution.

During his tenure as a deputy, he authored and developed the Regulation "On the Unified Social Transit Pass", proposed amendments to the investment program of the municipal enterprise Vodokanal, and initiated the resignation of Yekaterinburg Mayor Yevgeny Porunov.

=== Criminal Prosecution ===
In 2011, Petlin, together with the Yabloko party and urban activists, organized a series of protests against the development of a local park and the construction of the "Raduga-Park" shopping and entertainment center. Subsequently, the FSB fabricated an extortion case against him —alleging that he had demanded money in exchange for halting the protests against the park's development— and arrested him on February 22, 2011, while simultaneously conducting searches of his home and the party's office. After a prolonged period of house arrest, he was sentenced to three years in prison in 2013.

He gained widespread attention in connection with this case and was included in a list of 39 political prisoners whose release was demanded by opposition representatives in 2012. Vladimir Bukovsky publicly called for Petlin's release, describing him as a political prisoner. OpenDemocracy characterized Petlin's arrest as an assault on rights and freedoms in Russia and an attempt to eliminate the opposition in Yekaterinburg.

Ultimately, after serving his sentence, he was released on August 20, 2015, though he was stripped of the right to vote or run for public office until 2031.

In 2022, the European Court of Human Rights ruled that the FSB's wiretapping of Maxim Petlin was unlawful and awarded him compensation.

=== Subsequent career ===
After his release, Petlin told the press that he would not run for office for six years—until his criminal record was expunged. In December 2015, Igor Yakovlev, press secretary for Grigory Yavlinsky, announced that Petlin had become a member of the Yabloko party's federal bureau.

In June 2017, he criticized the Yabloko party's nomination of Yevgeny Roizman for governor of the Sverdlovsk Oblast. Petlin told the press he was unsure about the merits of the idea and might abstain from voting on the matter within the bureau.

In 2019, he was one of the organizers of a nationwide campaign against the importation of radioactive waste into Russia. In 2021, he was elected chairman of the party's regional branch and became one of the initiators of the "Yekaterinburg-2021" democratic coalition in the Sverdlovsk Oblast, aiming to unite democratic forces for the 2021 Legislative Assembly elections.

== Prosecution related to letter-writing events ==
On May 25, 2025, while hosting another letter-writing event for political prisoners, he was arrested alongside representatives from the Yabloko party, Youth Yabloko, and the SDR. This followed a false report filed by representatives of URAL LIVE—propagandist Ekaterina Ipatova and Sverdlovsk Region Legislative Assembly deputy Alexey Svalov (United Russia).

On April 30, 2026, he was arrested, and his home was searched and electronic equipment seized. According to media reports, he was accused of publicly justifying terrorism through the letter-writing events for political prisoners.
