= Koryak constituency =

Russian legislative constituency

Koryak single-member constituency
- Constituency of the Russian State Duma

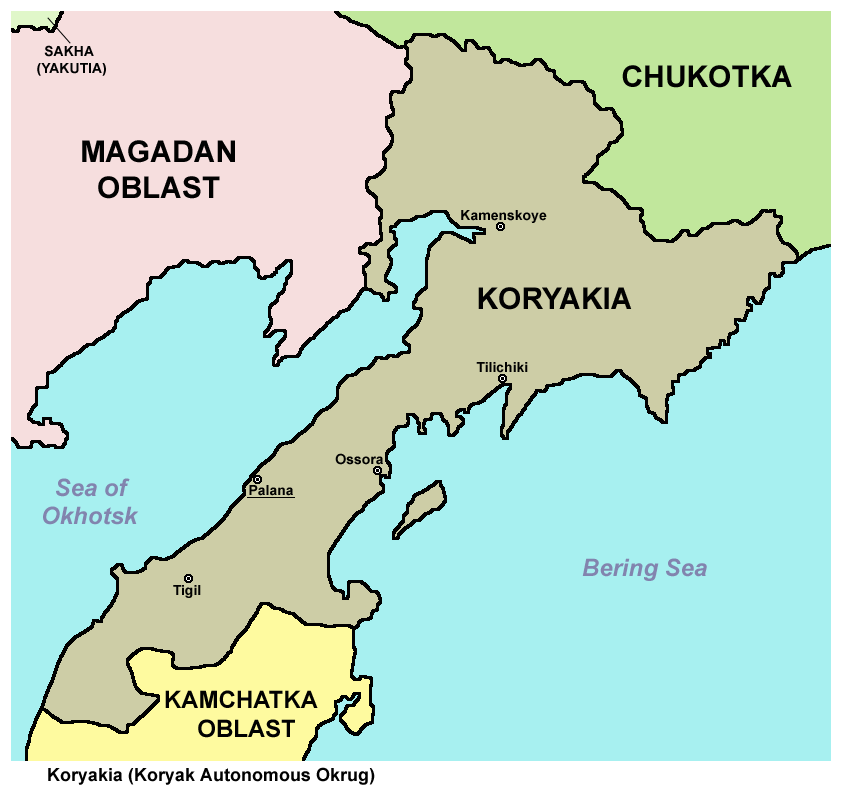
- Constituency boundaries from 1993 to 2007
- Deputy: None
- Federal subject: Koryak Autonomous Okrug
- Districts: Karaginsky, Olyutorsky, Palana, Penzhinsky, Tigilsky
- Voters: 18,175 (2003)

The Koryak constituency was a Russian legislative constituency in Koryak Autonomous Okrug between 1993 and 2007. It encompassed the entire territory of Koryak Autonomous Okrug. The seat was last occupied by United Russia faction member Rafael Gimalov, a banker, who defeated first-term incumbent State Duma member Grigory Oynvid in the 1999 legislative election.

The constituency was dissolved in 2007 when State Duma adopted full proportional representation for the next two electoral cycles. Earlier in 2007 Koryak Autonomous Okrug was merged with Kamchatka Oblast to form Kamchatka Krai. Currently the territory of the former Koryak constituency is part of the Kamchatka constituency.

== Boundaries ==
1993–2007: Karaginsky District, Olyutorsky District, Palana, Penzhinsky District, Tigilsky District
The constituency had been covering the entirety of Koryak Autonomous Okrug since its initial creation in 1993.

== Members elected ==
Election	Member	Party
1993	Mikhail Popov	Independent
1995	Grigory Oynvid	Independent
1999	Rafael Gimalov	Independent
2003	Rafael Gimalov	Independent

== Election results ==
=== 1993 ===
==== Declared candidates ====
- Marat Abdeyev (Independent), attorney
- Aleksandr Denisov (Independent), regional state television chief editor
- Sergey Khlopkov (LDPR), militsiya officer
- Leonid Kozlovsky (Independent), unemployed
- Vladimir Korchmit (Independent), Head of State Antimonopoly Committee regional office
- Mikhail Popov (Independent), former Member of Koryak Autonomous Okrug Council of People's Deputies (1990–1993), Koryak language researcher

==== Results ====
Summary of the 12 December 1993 Russian legislative election in the Koryak constituency
Candidate	Party	Votes	%
Mikhail Popov	Independent	1,969	14.65%
Marat Abdeyev	Independent	–	–
Aleksandr Denisov	Independent	–	–
Sergey Khlopkov	Liberal Democratic Party	–	–
Vladimir Korchmit	Independent	–	–
Leonid Kozlovsky	Independent	–	–
Total		13,436	100%

=== 1995 ===
==== Declared candidates ====
- Marat Abdeyev (Independent), attorney, 1993 candidate for this seat
- Igor Ankhani (Independent), construction specialist
- Anatoly Bachish (LDPR), aide to State Duma member
- Aleksandr Denisov (Independent), Member of Duma of the Koryak Autonomous Okrug (1994–present), 1993 candidate for this seat
- Yevgeny Kotlyarov (Independent), Head of the Department of Education of Koryak Autonomous Okrug
- Vladimir Kuznetsov (Independent), Head of the Department of Labor of Koryak Autonomous Okrug
- Aleksandr Leginov (Independent), indigenous rights civic leader
- Viktor Limonov (Independent), Academy of the Ministry of Internal Affairs of Russia employee
- Vladimir Mizinin (Independent), sovkhoz director
- Yury Neverov (Independent), mining executive
- Grigory Oynvid (Independent), Member of Federation Council (1994–present)
- Mikhail Popov (Independent), incumbent Member of State Duma (1994–present)
- Gennady Stepanov (Independent), physician
- Aleksey Vlasov (Independent), journalist

==== Results ====
Summary of the 17 December 1995 Russian legislative election in the Koryak constituency
Candidate	Party	Votes	%
Grigory Oynvid	Independent	2,494	18.00%
Vladimir Mizinin	Independent	1,695	12.24%
Viktor Limonov	Independent	1,473	10.63%
Yevgeny Kotlyarov	Independent	1,146	8.27%
Aleksandr Denisov	Independent	967	6.98%
Aleksandr Leginov	Independent	641	4.63%
Mikhail Popov (incumbent)	Independent	516	3.72%
Anatoly Bachish	Liberal Democratic Party	505	3.65%
Marat Abdeyev	Independent	492	3.55%
Igor Ankhani	Independent	483	3.49%
Gennady Stepanov	Independent	370	2.67%
Yury Neverov	Independent	267	1.93%
Vladimir Kuznetsov	Independent	169	1.22%
Aleksey Vlasov	Independent	137	0.99%
against all		2,234	16.13%
Total		13,853	100%

=== 1999 ===
==== Declared candidates ====
- Aleksandr Denisov (Independent), Member of Duma of the Koryak Autonomous Okrug (1994–present), 1993 and 1995 candidate for this seat
- Rafael Gimalov (Independent), banker
- Mikhail Glubokovsky (Yabloko), Member of State Duma (1994–present), Chairman of the Duma Committee on Natural Resources (1999–present)
- Sergey Klemantovich (Independent), businessman
- Aleksandra Klyuchnikova (Independent), Member of Duma of the Koryak Autonomous Okrug (1994–present)
- Vladimir Korchmit (Independent), businessman, 1993 candidate for this seat
- Sergey Lyoushkin (Independent), former Governor of Koryak Autonomous Okrug (1991–1996)
- Nikolay Moskalyov (Independent), Honor and Motherland party regional chairman
- Yevgeny Mel (Independent), businessman
- Ella Oshchepkova (Independent), Member of Duma of the Koryak Autonomous Okrug (1996–present)
- Grigory Oynvid (Independent), incumbent Member of State Duma (1996–present)
- Andrey Semikolennykh (Independent), Chairman of the Koryak Autonomous Okrug Committee on Mineral Resources Development
- Nina Solodyakova (Independent), Member of Kamchatka Oblast Council of People's Deputies (1995–1997, 1998–present), former People's Deputy of Russia (1990–1993), 1996 gubernatorial candidate

==== Failed to qualify ====
- Aleksey Kazantsev (Independent), businessman
- Oleg Shkrebetsky (LDPR), party official
- Valery Tnagirgin (Independent), municipal official

==== Results ====
Summary of the 19 December 1999 Russian legislative election in the Koryak constituency
Candidate	Party	Votes	%
Rafael Gimalov	Independent	5,032	38.05%
Sergey Lyoushkin	Independent	1,530	11.57%
Nina Solodyakova	Independent	1,313	9.93%
Grigory Oynvid (incumbent)	Independent	1,031	7.80%
Mikhail Glubokovsky	Yabloko	910	6.88%
Sergey Klemantovich	Independent	746	5.64%
Yevgeny Mel	Independent	599	4.53%
Andrey Semikolennykh	Independent	353	2.67%
Nikolay Moskalyov	Independent	251	1.90%
Aleksandr Denisov	Independent	106	0.80%
Vladimir Korchmit	Independent	98	0.74%
Aleksandra Klyuchnikova	Independent	88	0.67%
Ella Oshchepkova	Independent	42	0.32%
against all		823	6.22%
Total		13,226	100%

=== 2003 ===
==== Declared candidates ====
- Valentina Bronevich (Independent), former Governor of Koryak Autonomous Okrug (1996–2000)
- Rafael Gimalov (Independent), incumbent Member of State Duma (2000–present)
- Aleksandr Kaptsevich (Independent), unemployed
- Aleksandr Suvorov (CPRF), Senator from Koryak Autonomous Okrug (2001–present)

==== Results ====
Summary of the 7 December 2003 Russian legislative election in the Koryak constituency
Candidate	Party	Votes	%
Rafael Gimalov (incumbent)	Independent	6,725	59.83%
Valentina Bronevich	Independent	1,658	14.75%
Aleksandr Suvorov	Communist Party	1,270	11.30%
Aleksandr Kaptsevich	Independent	320	2.85%
against all		1,104	9.82%
Total		11,289	100%
