= Kamchatka State Technical University =

- Камчатский государственный технический университет
- Type: public
- Established: 1942
- Location: Petropavlovsk-Kamchatsky, Russia; 53°02′08″N 158°39′09″E
- Campus: urban
- Language: Russian
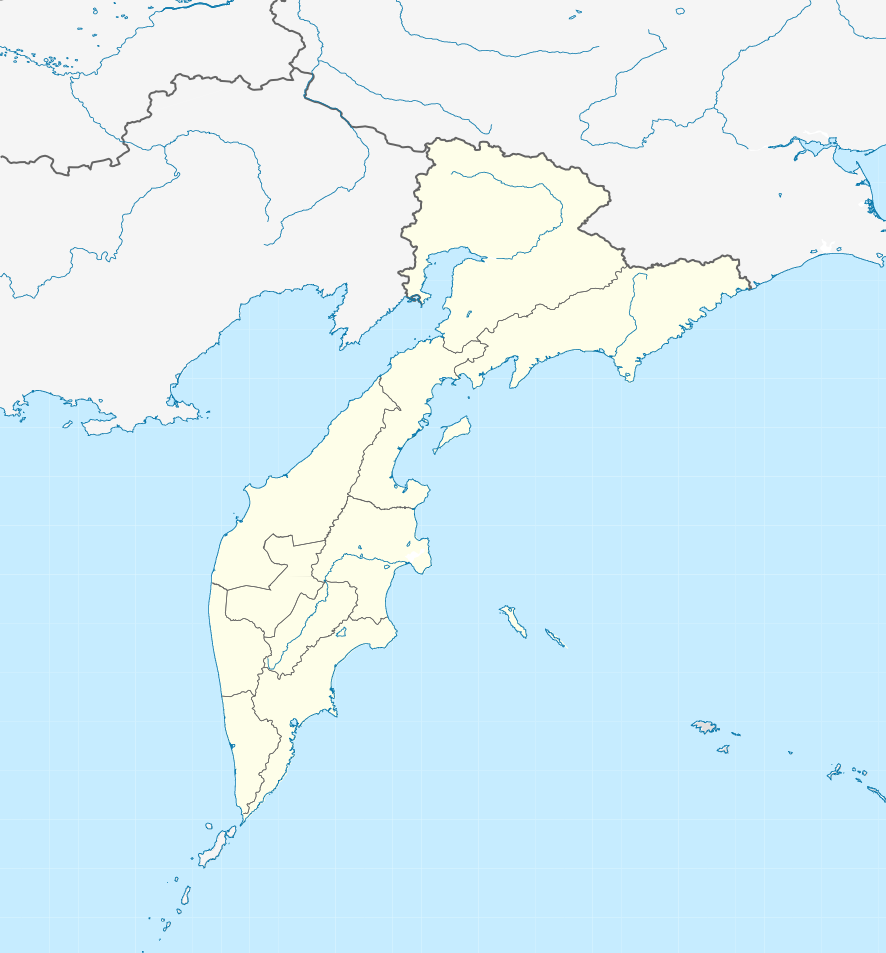
- Location in Kamchatka Krai Kamchatka State Technical University (Russia)

Kamchatka State Technical University (Russian: Камчатский государственный технический университет) is a public university located in Petropavlovsk-Kamchatsky, Russia. It was founded in 1942.

== History ==
The history of the university is usually counted from the moment of Petropavlovsk-Kamchatsky Marine Fisheries Technical School foundation in 1942. Order of USSR People's Commissariat for Fishery Industry about technical school organization dated January 6, 1942 reached Petropavlovsk only on January 20. In the city began to build classrooms and a dormitory for students.

During World War II the Kamchatka fishing industry received an impetus to development: fishing was no longer seasonal, fishing began to be carried out from trawling vessels and not only near the shore, new types of products appeared and new types of fish processing and storage in the form of its freezing began to be introduced. The port of Petropavlovsk was expanded and began to be used as a transshipment base for cargo from the United States and Canada. The main user of the peninsula's natural resources, the Kamchatka Joint Stock Company, needed new qualified personnel. In 1946, the technical school received a new name: "Petropavlovsk-Kamchatka Marine Fisheries Technical School of the Ministry of Fisheries Industry of the Eastern regions of the USSR".

In February 1952, the technical school was transformed into the Petropavlovsk-Kamchatka Naval Military School (PKMU). After the reorganization, students began to be called cadets, and the teaching staff included officers. In 1960, the school began training radio specialists and opened a correspondence department. Engineers in Kamchatka began to be trained even earlier, since 1957, when in Petropavlovsk there was opened a training and consulting center of the Far East Technical Institute of Fish Industry and Economy.

Since January 1, 1991, Petropavlovsk-Kamchatka Nautical College and Petropavlovsk-Kamchatka Higher Marine Engineering School were transformed into an educational complex "Petropavlovsk-Kamchatka Higher Marine School" (PKVMU).

In 1997 PKVMU was renamed into KGARF (Kamchatka State Academy of Fishing Fleet). In 2000 it was renamed into Kamchatka State Technical University (KSTU). This name is kept by the educational institution until now.

== Structure ==
- Faculty of Information Technology.
- Maritime Faculty.
- Faculty of Technology.
- Faculty of Economics and Management.
- Continuous education faculty.
- Military training center at FSBEI VPO "Kamchatka State Technical University".
- College
