= Nikolay Pyatchits =

Russian politician (1947–1994)

- Николай Пятчиц

Member of the State Duma
- In office 12 December 1993 – 29 July 1994

Personal details
- Born: Nikolay Mitrofanovich Pyatchits; 2 January 1947 Soviet Union
- Died: 31 March 1994 (aged 47) Russia
- Party: Communist Party of the Russian Federation

Nikolay Mitrofanovich Pyatchits (Russian: Николай Митрофанович Пятчиц; 2 January 1947 - 31 March 1994), was a Russian politician who had served as a member of the State Duma from 1993 until his death in 1994.

== Biography ==
He worked as an engine tester at the ZiL automobile plant.

In 1993 he was elected to the State Duma.

He was a member of the State Duma Committee on Economic Policy and a member of the Communist Party faction.

He died on 31 March 1994. The mandate passed on to Vladimir Frolov.

In July 1995, the State Duma adopted, and in August of the same year, President Boris Yeltsin signed the Federal Law “On housing, material support and medical care for the widow of N. M. Pyatchits,” according to which Pyatchits’ son and widow, in particular, were given a two-room apartment in Moscow.

== See also ==
- List of members of the State Duma of Russia who died in office
