= Mikhail Zadornov (politician) =

Russian politician (born 1963)

- Михаил Задорнов
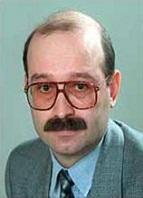

First Deputy Prime Minister
- In office 25 May 1999 – 28 May 1999
- Prime Minister: Sergei Stepashin

Minister of Finance
- In office 9 November 1997 – May 1999
- Prime Minister: Viktor Chernomyrdin; Sergei Kiriyenko; Yevgeny M. Primakov
- Preceded by: Anatoly Chubais
- Succeeded by: Mikhail Kasyanov

Personal details
- Born: Mikhail Mikhailovich Zadornov; 4 May 1963 (age 63) Moscow, Russian SFSR, Soviet Union
- Party: Yabloko (1993–1997)
- Education: Plekhanov Russian University of Economics; USSR Academy of Sciences

Mikhail Mikhailovich Zadornov (Russian: Михаил Михайлович Задорнов; born 4 May 1963) is a Russian economist, chairman of the management board of Otkritie FC Bank, President and chairman of the management board of VTB 24 in the years 2005–2017, government official, Russian Minister of Finance from 1997 to 1999, Russian State Duma Deputy, 1st – 4th Convocations. Recipient of the Order "For Merit to the Fatherland" IV class and a Certificate of Honour from the Russian Government.

== Family and early life ==
Mikhail Zadornov was born on 4 May 1963 in Moscow to a family of geologists and spent his early years with his parents in Kamchatka Oblast (in 1995, he was elected as this region's deputy to the Russian State Duma).

== Education ==
In 1980, Zadornov graduated with honours (gold medal) from Secondary School No. 875 in Moscow. In 1984, Zadornov graduated with honours (“red diploma”) from Plekhanov Moscow Institute of People's Economy (currently known as Plekhanov Russian University of Economics). In 1988, after serving two years in the Soviet army, he received a master's degree from the Institute of Economics of the USSR Academy of Sciences. In 1989, Zadornov was awarded a PhD in economics (he wrote his dissertation on Efficiency of Plant Renovation Investments in Industrial Enterprises).

== Economist ==
- 1988–1990 – research fellow at the Institute of Economics (USSR Academy of Sciences).
- 1989–1990 – expert in the planning and budgeting commission of the Supreme Soviet of the USSR.
- 1990 – member of the State Commission for Economic Reform (headed by Grigory Yavlinsky) at the RSFSR Council of Ministers and co-author of the 500 Days economic programme.
- 1991–1993 – leading research fellow and board member at the Centre for Economic and Political Studies (EPIcentre), then headed by G.A. Yavlinsky; participant in EPIcentre's projects Take a Chance (Harvard, United States, 1991) and Nizhny Novgorod (1992).

== Politician ==
In 1993, Zadornov was among founders of the Yabloko movement (currently known as "Yabloko" Russian united democratic party).

1994–1995 – deputy of the 1st State Duma, member of the Yabloko parliamentary group. Chairman of the Committee for the Budget, Taxes, Banks and Finance.

1996–1997 – deputy of the 2nd State Duma (elected to represent the Kamchatka constituency as a member of Yabloko); Chairman of the Committee for the Budget, Taxes, Banks and Finance.

November 1997 – May 1999: Minister of Finance of the Russian Federation (in the cabinets of Prime Ministers Viktor Chernomyrdin, Sergei Kiriyenko and Yevgeny Primakov). Zadornov joined the cabinet without the authorisation of the Yabloko party and for this reason he withdrew from the party leadership. He participated in the decision-making for the default in August 1998. Following the default, Zadornov offered his letter of resignation, which was not accepted.

On 25 May 1999, Zadornov was appointed First Deputy Prime Minister of Russia, but filed to resign (and was succeeded in office by Mikhail Kasyanov) after learning that the appointment was subject to his resignation as Minister of Finance. Zadornov's resignation as First Deputy Prime Minister was accepted on 28 May 1999.

May – September 1999 – Russian Special Presidential Envoy for relations with international financial institutions. October – December 1999 – Special Advisor to the president of Sberbank of Russia.

2000–2003 – Deputy in 3rd State Duma (elected to represent the Universitetsky constituency of Moscow with the Yabloko party); member of the Yabloko parliamentary group; Deputy Chairman of the Budget and Taxes Committee; member of the Commission for Review of Federal Budget Expenditures for Defence and National Security.

2004–2005 – (independent) Deputy in 4th State Duma (elected to represent the Universitetsky constituency of Moscow with the Yabloko party); independent deputy; member of the Budget and Taxes Committee.

Since April 2005 – member of the Republican Party of Russia, member of the party's policy council.

=== Sanctions ===
Zadornov was sanctioned by the UK government on 4 May 2022 in relation to the Russo-Ukrainian War.

== Executive ==
- Since June 2005 – Member of the Board of Directors of Seventh Continent (as a non-executive director).
- Since July 2005 – President and Chairman of VTB 24.
- Since 2011 – chairman of the Board of Directors of TransCreditBank OJSC.
- Since 2010 – chairman of the Board of Directors of VTB Insurance LLC.
- Since 2015 – Member of the Board of Directors of Bank of Moscow.
- Since 2016 – Member of the supervisory board of Post Bank PJSC.
- December 2016 – May 2017 – Member of the management board of VTB Bank.
- Since January 2018 – chairman of the management board of Otkritie FC Bank which was taken over by the Central Bank in August 2017 as part of financial rehabilitation measures.

In 2010, Zadornov was ranked No.1 in the rating of bank executives compiled by the Kommersant newspaper.

== Views ==
Zadornov is an advocate of the free-market economics and monetarism. He supported and implemented tough fiscal policies when he was finance minister.

== Hobbies ==
When not in the office, Zadornov enjoys sports and spends time supporting his favourite football and basketball teams. He is also fond of the theatre, classical music and travel.

== Personal life ==
Mikhail Zadornov is married and has a daughter.
