= Vladimir Novikov (politician, born 1960) =

Russian politician

- Владимир Новиков
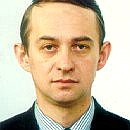

Deputy of the 1st State Duma
- In office 1993–1995

Personal details
- Born: 14 April 1960 (age 66) Glazov, Udmurt Autonomous Soviet Socialist Republic, Russian Soviet Federative Socialist Republic, USSR
- Party: Liberal Democratic Party of Russia
- Education: Perm Higher Command School, Kirov Polytechnic Institute

Vladimir Novikov (Russian: Владимир Ильич Новиков; born 14 April 1960, Glazov, Udmurt Autonomous Soviet Socialist Republic) is a Russian political figure and a deputy of the 1st State Duma. After graduating from the Kirov Polytechnic Institute in 1985, he started working as a commercial director at the Stalker LLP. In 1993, he ran with the Liberal Democratic Party of Russia for the 1st State Duma where he joined the environmental committee and co-authored two legislative initiatives and amendments to draft federal laws.
