= Vadim Bolshakov =

American neuroscientist

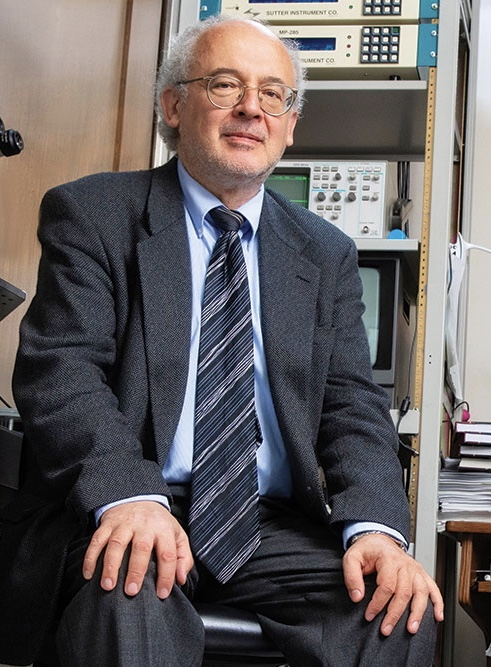
Vadim Bolshakov in 2020

Vadim Bolshakov is a Russian-born American neuroscientist, a professor of psychiatry at Harvard Medical School. He has been Director of the Cellular Neurobiology Laboratory at McLean Hospital since 1999. He received The Esther A. and Joseph Klingenstein Fund award in 2001 and NARSAD Distinguished Investigator award in 2013.

Bolshakov is an associate editor of Frontiers in Neural Circuits, published by Frontiers, an associate editor of Neurochemistry International, published by Elsevier, and a consulting editor of Amino Acids, published by Springer. He presently serves on the Scientific Council of the Brain & Behavior Research Foundation.

In his work, he focuses on understanding the cellular and neural network-level mechanisms of learned and innate behaviors with an emphasis on studies of fear mechanisms in the brain. He demonstrated that negatively-charged memories, resulting in uncontrollable fear and anxiety, are associated with long-term functional changes at synaptic contacts in the amygdala. He also demonstrated that these aversive memories, as well as synaptic modifications associated with them, can be controlled by the expression of specific genes in brain regions responsible for emotional states. Overall, his findings provide evidence that synaptic plasticity in specific projections within behavior-controlling neural circuits may serve as a cellular mechanism of memory formation and retention.
