= Alexander Zaveryukha =

Russian politician

- Александр Заверюха
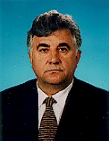

Deputy Prime Minister of Russia
- In office 10 February 1993 – 17 March 1997
- President: Boris Yeltsin
- Prime Minister: Viktor Chernomyrdin

Minister of Agriculture
- In office 12 January – 14 May 1996
- President: Boris Yeltsin
- Prime Minister: Viktor Chernomyrdin
- Preceded by: Aleksandr Nazarchuk
- Succeeded by: Viktor Khlystun

Personal details
- Born: April 30, 1940
- Died: March 21, 2015 (aged 74)
- Party: Agrarian Party of Russia
- Education: George Washington University; Orenburg Agricultural Institute
- Occupation: Politician

Military service
- Allegiance: Soviet Union
- Branch/service: Soviet Army
- Years of service: 1959–1962

Alexander Kharlampieyevich Zaveryukha (Russian: Алекса́ндр Харла́мпиевич Заверю́ха; 30 April 1940 — 21 March 2015) was a Russian politician of the late Soviet Union and the early years of the Russian Federation, serving under President Boris Yeltsin. He served as a Deputy Chairman of the Government of the Russian Federation for the agricultural industry in Viktor Chernomyrdin's first and second cabinets. Zaveryukha was also the leader of the Agrarian Party of Russia.

== Early life ==
Born in 1940, he worked as a tractor driver and later was a tank commander in the Soviet Army, from 1959 to 1962. He then graduated from an agricultural institute and held various positions in the Orenburg Oblast agricultural industry.

== Career in politics ==
After the fall of the USSR, Zaveryukha was one of the leading members of the new Agrarian Party of Russia, a rural ally of the Communist Party of the Russian Federation. In 1993 he was elected to the State Duma on the Agrarian ticket.

On February 10, 1993, a presidential decree appointed Alexander Zaveryukha to deputy prime minister for agriculture. In early 1994 Zaveryukha's proposal for agricultural subsidies to help aid the ailing former Soviet collectivized farms was approved. From January to May 1996, he also served as acting Minister of Agriculture. One of his opponents was finance minister and deputy prime minister Boris Fyodorov, who resigned in January 1994 after Zaveryukha and Viktor Gerashchenko were not fired at his request. On March 17, 1997, he was removed from his post as deputy prime minister.

== Sources ==
=== Books ===
- Bowker, Mike (2000). Russia after the Cold War. Routledge. ISBN 978-0582368156.
- Dawisha, Karen (1997). Democratic Changes and Authoritarian Reactions in Russia, Ukraine, Belarus and Moldova. Cambridge University Press. ISBN 978-0521597326.
