= Sergey Ivanenko =

Russian politician (1959–2024)

- Сергей Иваненко
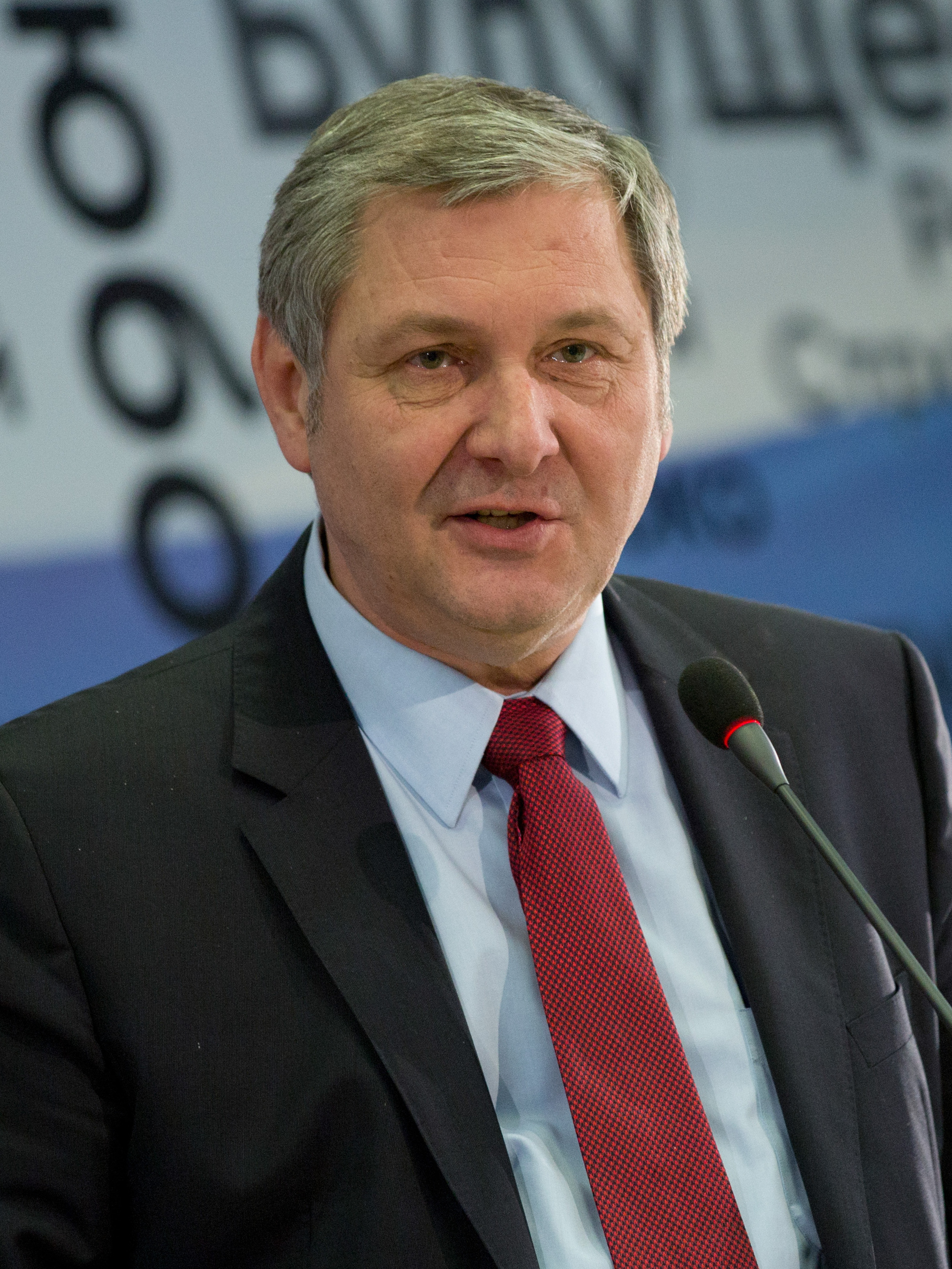
- Ivanenko in 2017

Member of the State Duma
- In office 12 December 1993 – 29 December 2003

Personal details
- Born: Sergey Viktorovich Ivanenko; 12 January 1959 Zestaponi, Georgian SSR, USSR
- Died: 4 September 2024 (aged 65) Moscow, Russia
- Party: Yabloko
- Education: Moscow State University
- Occupation: Economist

Sergey Viktorovich Ivanenko (Russian: Серге́й Ви́кторович Иване́нко; 12 January 1959 – 4 September 2024) was a Russian economist and politician. A member of Yabloko, he served in the State Duma from 1993 to 2003.

Ivanenko died in Moscow on 4 September 2024, at the age of 65.
