= Viktor Talanov =

Russian politician (1951–2025)

- Виктор Таланов
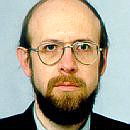
- Talanov in 1993

Member of the State Duma
- In office 12 December 1993 – 16 December 1995

Personal details
- Born: Viktor Lvovich Talanov; 1 May 1951; Leningrad, Russian SFSR, USSR
- Died: 6 May 2025 (aged 74); Saint Petersburg, Russia
- Political party: DPR
- Spouse: Olga Talanova
- Children: Alexander; Evgenia
- Education: Leningrad State University
- Occupation: Physicist, politician

Viktor Lvovich Talanov (Russian: Виктор Львович Таланов; 1 May 1951 – 6 May 2025) was a Russian politician. A member of the Democratic Party, he served in the State Duma from 1993 to 1995.

Talanov died in Saint Petersburg on 6 May 2025, at the age of 74.
