= Vladimir Frolov (politician) =

Russian politician

- Владимир Фролов

Member of the State Duma
- In office 29 July 1994 – 1995

Personal details
- Born: Vladimir Afasaneyevich Frolov; 11 March 1946 (age 80) Kotovsk, Russia, Soviet Union
- Party: Communist Party of the Russian Federation

Vladimir Afasaneyevich Frolov (Russian: Владимир Афанасьевич Фролов; born on 11 March 1946), is a Russian politician, actor, and former army officer who has served as a member of the State Duma from 1994 to 1995.

== Biography ==
Vladimir Frolov was born on 11 March 1946 in Kotovsk, Tambov Oblast to a military family, and has spent his childhood in Kaliningrad.

In 1961, he worked at one of the enterprises in Kaliningrad as an assembly mechanic.

In 1964, he graduated from the theater studio at the Kaliningrad Regional Drama Theater and was accepted as an actor into the troupe.

From 1965 to 1968, he served in the army.

After serving in the army, having graduated from GITIS in 1972, he became the artistic director of the course was the Moscow Art Theater actor, People's Artist of the USSR V. Orlov in Volgograd. His father Afanasy had died earlier at that time.

In 1977, he graduated from the Higher Theater Directing Courses (workshop of Anatoly Efros).

He worked at the Volgograd Regional Drama Theater, the Oryol Academic Theater named after. I. S. Turgeneva since 1978. In December 1985, he was the Honored Artist of the RSFSR.

He worked as the chief director of the Kaliningrad Regional Drama Theater. In 1993, he was the director of the Oryol Russian Style Theater.

=== Member of the State Duma ===
Frolov entered politics by joining the Communist Party of the Russian Federation.

On 29 July 1994, Frolov became a member of parliament, a deputy of the State Duma of the first convocation for the federal district of the Communist Party of the Russian Federation. receiving a mandate after Nikolay Pyatchits' death.

He had been a candidate member of the Central Committee of the Communist Party of the Russian Federation.

In the State Duma, he was asked to head the subcommittee on culture, art and public relations, but became a member of the State Duma Committee on International Affairs.

In 1995, he unsuccessfully ran for the State Duma of the second convocation.

From 1996 to 1999, he was an advisor to the Staff of the State Duma Committee on the Rules and Organization of the Work of the State Duma. He was a member of the International Academy of Informatization in 1998.

Since 2010, he is an actor at the Moscow Drama Theater "Soprichastnost".

== Family ==
He gets married and has a daughter, Angelina. He currently lives in Moscow.
