= Yabloko =

Russian political party

Russian United Democratic Party "Yabloko" Российская объединённая демократическая партия «Яблоко»
- Leader: Nikolay Rybakov
- Founders: Grigory Yavlinsky; Yury Boldyrev; Vladimir Lukin
- Founded: 16 October 1993; 33 years ago (electoral alliance); 5 January 1995; 31 years ago (public association); 22 December 2001; 24 years ago (political party)
- Headquarters: Moscow
- Membership: 4,000 (2026)
- Ideology: Social liberalism; Progressivism; Pacifism; Feminism; Pro-Europeanism; Faction: Social democracy
- Political position: Centre-left
- European affiliation: Alliance of Liberals and Democrats for Europe Party (2006–2025)
- International affiliation: Liberal International
- Colours: Green; Red
- Seats in the Federation Council: 0 / 170
- Seats in the State Duma: 0 / 450
- Governors: 0 / 85
- Seats in the Regional Parliaments: 1 / 3,928 (Note: As of 2026, this is 1 seat in Novgorod)
- Ministers: 0 / 31

Website
- yabloko.ru
- Politics of Russia; Political parties; Elections; A: Yabloko is considered a left-wing party by some sources; Boris Nemtsov also described it as "left-wing". Yabloko has also been characterized as centrist on an international political spectrum because of its positioning as the "non-system opposition" left-liberal party supporting liberal democracy.

The Russian United Democratic Party "Yabloko" (RUDP Yabloko; Russian: Российская объединённая демократическая партия «Яблоко», romanized: Rossiyskaya obyedinyonnaya demokraticheskaya partiya "Yabloko", [ˈjabləkə], lit. 'Apple') is a social-liberal political party in Russia. The organization positions itself as "Russia's only democratic party". A number of political scientists and researchers characterize Yabloko as the only legally registered party in the country that stands in actual opposition to the current government. Party representatives and independent observers state that the organization's members face systemic government pressure and repression.

The party consequently participated in the elections of deputies of the State Duma of the Federal Assembly of the Russian Federation of all eight convocations. Until 2003, Yabloko was represented by a faction in the State Duma and later until 2007 by individual deputies. In March 2002, the party became a full member of the Liberal International, and since November 1998, it has been in observer status. The founder of the party Grigory Yavlinsky is an honorary vice-president of the Liberal International and winner of its Prize for Freedom. Yabloko was a member of the Alliance of Liberals and Democrats for Europe (ALDE) from 2006 to 2025. As of 2021, the party was represented by factions in 4 regional parliaments of the Russian Federation. In addition, members of the party were deputies of 13 administrative centers of the subjects of the Russian Federation, 183 representatives of the party were municipal deputies in Moscow and 84 in Saint Petersburg.

Yabloko is the sole officially registered party to openly oppose the Russian war in Ukraine, openly calling "for peace and freedom". The party planned to partake in the 2026 Russian legislative election under their anti-war slogan. However, in August 2026, the party was barred from running by the Supreme Court of Russia due to a lawsuit by Rodina. The suit alleged that Yabloko received funding from foreign countries and supported the "international LGBT movement". Yabloko officials state that they intend to appeal the ruling.

== History ==
The party dates back to the early 1990s. Originally established as a public organization in 1993, it transformed into a political party in 2001. From 1993 to 2003, the party had a small faction in the State Duma; in 2003, four single-mandate deputies passed from Yabloko to the Duma: one of them joined United Russia, and three joined the informal group of independent democrats. After the tightening of Russian legislation in 2011, only 7 registered political parties remained in Russia, among which was Yabloko. In 2011, the party managed to obtain the right to state funding, which allowed further functioning of the organization. As a result of the 2016 elections, the party is not receiving any state funding any further.

=== Emergence of the Party (1993–2002) ===
The immediate predecessor of the Yabloko party was the electoral bloc Yavlinsky-Boldyrev-Lukin, formed for the legislative elections of 1993. "Yabloko" is an acronym of the names of its founders: "Я" (Ya) for Grigory Yavlinsky; "Б" (B) for Yury Boldyrev, and "Л" (L) for Vladimir Lukin, with the full name meaning "Apple" in Russian.

The bloc included several political parties: the Republican, the Social Democratic, and the Russian Christian Democratic Union – New Democracy. The Yabloko bloc in the 1993 elections received 7.86% of the vote, as a result of which the Yabloko faction was created in the State Duma In January 1995 Yabloko was transformed into a public association after holding a founding congress. Yavlinsky became the head of the central council. Already during this period, there were some changes in the leadership. In 1994 part of the representatives of the Republican Party, headed by Vladimir Lysenko, left the bloc. At the same time, the Regional Center Party from St. Petersburg joined Yabloko as a regional organization. In September 1995, due to disagreements on some fundamental issues, Yury Boldyrev left the association as well.

The Yabloko public association was able to form factions based on the results of the elections to the State Duma in 1995 and 1999. In 1995, in the elections to the State Duma of the 2nd convocation, the Yabloko association received 6.89% of the vote. In the elections of the State Duma of the III convocation in 1999 Yabloko association made an alliance with Sergei Stepashin, including him as number three of the party list. According to the results of the vote count, the party received 5.93% of the votes.

Yabloko during the entire period of President Yeltsin became the "democratic opposition" to the president's policies. For example, Yabloko opposed privatization conducted by Anatoly Chubais, and offered an alternative program in 1998, which stated that privatization was carried out in an economically senseless and socially detrimental way, passing control of sold organizations to the "directors" with several backdrop nominal owners.

During the 1996 elections, Yavlinsky was offered to join the government. As a condition to join Yabloko's leader demanded an end to hostilities in Chechnya and to make serious adjustments to the socio-economic policy. In addition, he demanded the resignation of Prime Minister Viktor Chernomyrdin, head of the Security Service of the President of the Russian Federation Alexander Korzhakov, First Deputy Prime Minister Oleg Soskovets, Defense Minister Pavel Grachev, head of the presidential administration Nikolai Yegorov, director of the FSS Mikhail Barsukov. Since these conditions were not accepted, Yavlinsky and his team did not enter the government.

Some members of the Yabloko faction nevertheless accepted the proposals of the executive branch. Mikhail Zadornov and Oksana Dmitrieva became members of the government, for which they were expelled from the party. Also, Ivan Grachev and Vyacheslav Igrunov left Yabloko.

In May 1999, the Yabloko faction voted for the impeachment of President Yeltsin. The bulk of the State Duma deputies supported the accusation of the president of unleashing war in Chechnya and 24 deputies voted for the impeachment of Yeltsin on charges of an armed dispersal of the Supreme Council in October 1993. Yabloko, however, refused to support other articles of accusations, including the article proposed by the Communist Party of the Russian Federation about the "genocide of the Russian people." Yabloko criticized presidential and government policies and regularly voted against draft state budgets submitted by the Cabinet of Ministers to the Duma.

On 16 August 1999, 18 members of the Yabloko faction, including Yavlinsky, voted for the appointment of Vladimir Putin as Prime Minister, 4 members abstained, 8 voted against, and 15 did not vote. In May 2000, 4 deputies of the Yabloko faction voted for the appointment of Mikhail Kasyanov as prime minister, 8 members voted against and 4 abstained. Yabloko also supported a bill developed with the participation of faction deputy Mikhail Zadornov on the introduction of a flat income tax instead of a progressive taxation scale.

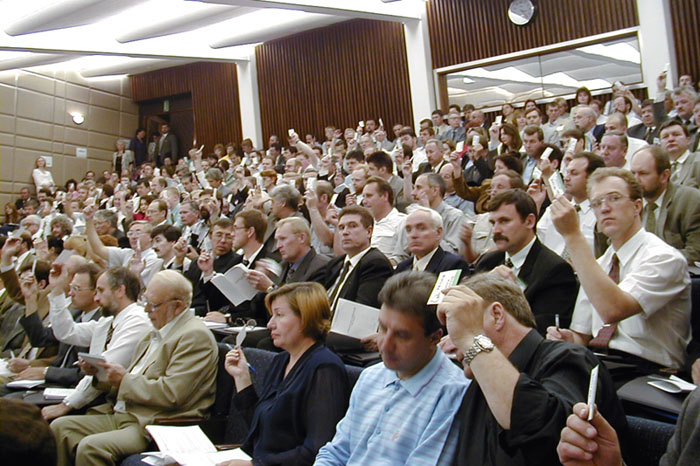
8th Congress of Yabloko

Since Putin was never supported by a majority of Yabloko members, the party found itself in fierce opposition to the government, criticizing the government during the remaining term of the State Duma of the third convocation, especially as parliamentary elections approached.

In December 2001, on the basis of the all-Russian political public organization Yabloko and the Party of Social liberalism the Russian Democratic Party Yabloko was officially created, which advocates the European path of development of the Russian Federation and is a member of several international and European organizations. Since November 1998, the Yabloko association has had observer status with the Liberal International and participated in its events. At the 51st Congress of the Liberal International, held on 21–23 March 2002 in Budapest, the Yabloko party was accepted into the ranks of this international organization as a full member.

=== Political party (2002 to present) ===
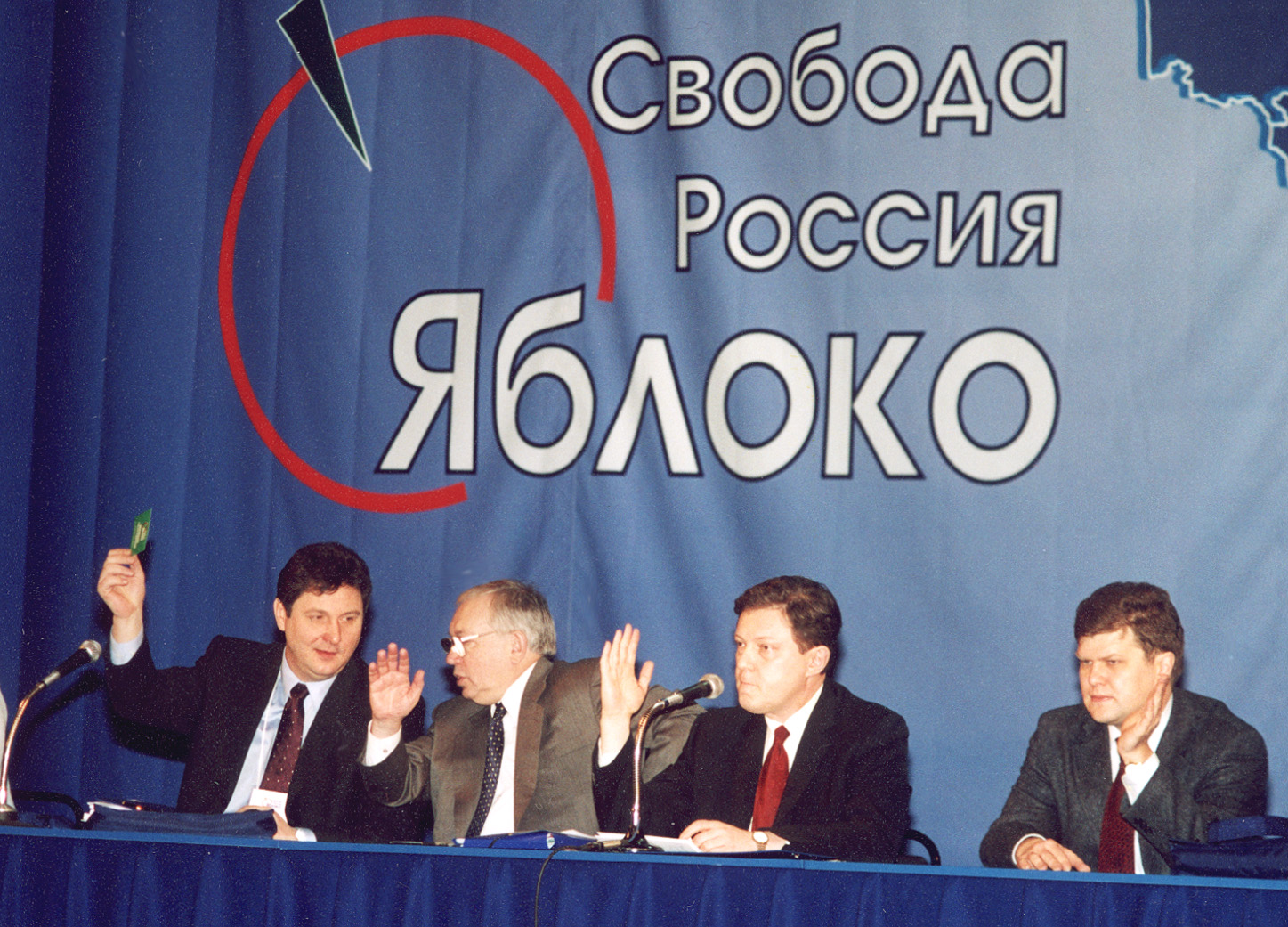
The 10th Congress of the Yabloko association, at which it was transformed into a political party.

On 26 April 2002, the Russian Democratic Party Yabloko (Reg. No. 5018) was registered by the Ministry of Justice. Grigory Yavlinsky was elected chairman of the party.

According to the deputy chairman of Yabloko, Sergei Ivanenko, in 2002 the party had 20,000 members.

In June 2003, the Yabloko faction voted for a vote of no confidence in the government, which, however, was not approved by the Duma.

Since 2003, Yabloko's position has worsened. In the 2003 State Duma elections, the Yabloko party received 4.3% of the vote (less than the 5% threshold) and did not receive seats in the State Duma on party lists (only 4 candidates from the party went through single-mandate constituencies). Interestingly, the fact that Vladimir Putin called Grigory Yavlinsky at night, during the counting of votes, with congratulations on the victory, became widely known.

After the joining of Green Russia and Soldiers' Mothers in 2006, the name of the party was changed to the Russian United Democratic Party "Yabloko" (RODP "Yabloko"). Since 2006, the Yabloko party has become part of the European party Alliance of Liberals and Democrats for Europe (ALDE). Sergey Mitrokhin became party chairman in 2008.

In the 2007 elections, only 1.59% of voters voted for Yabloko, and the party did not enter the State Duma again. In 2008 the party had 58,540 members. In the 2011 elections according to official data from the CEC, 3.43% of voters (2.25 million people) voted for Yabloko. In these elections, the party more than doubled its result but still did not get into the State Duma. However, this result gave Yabloko the possibility of state funding. In 2012 Yabloko leader Grigory Yavlinsky was not registered by the Central Election Commission as a candidate for the presidential elections.

In 2021 the party had 16,100 members.

In the elections to the State Duma of 2021, Grigory Yavlinsky for the first time in the history of the party refused to run for deputies, and the federal list of candidates was headed by Yabloko chairman Nikolay Rybakov. 1.34% of voters voted for Yabloko (750 000 people). On 14 October 2021, the Federal Political Committee of the party decided to withdraw from the election candidates who supported the idea of Smart Voting Alexei Navalny. Several Yabloko members criticized the party's policies and demanded the leadership to resign.

On 26 October 2021, the members of the Arkhangelsk regional branch of Yabloko published a statement, in which they demanded that the central political committee of the party be dismissed due to the adoption of the so-called "Yavlinsky blacklist", which led to the suspension of the activities of the branch. On 19 November 2021, the federal bureau of Yabloko appointed the re-registration of party members prior to the upcoming party congress in December

==== Russian invasion of Ukraine and stance on war in Ukraine ====
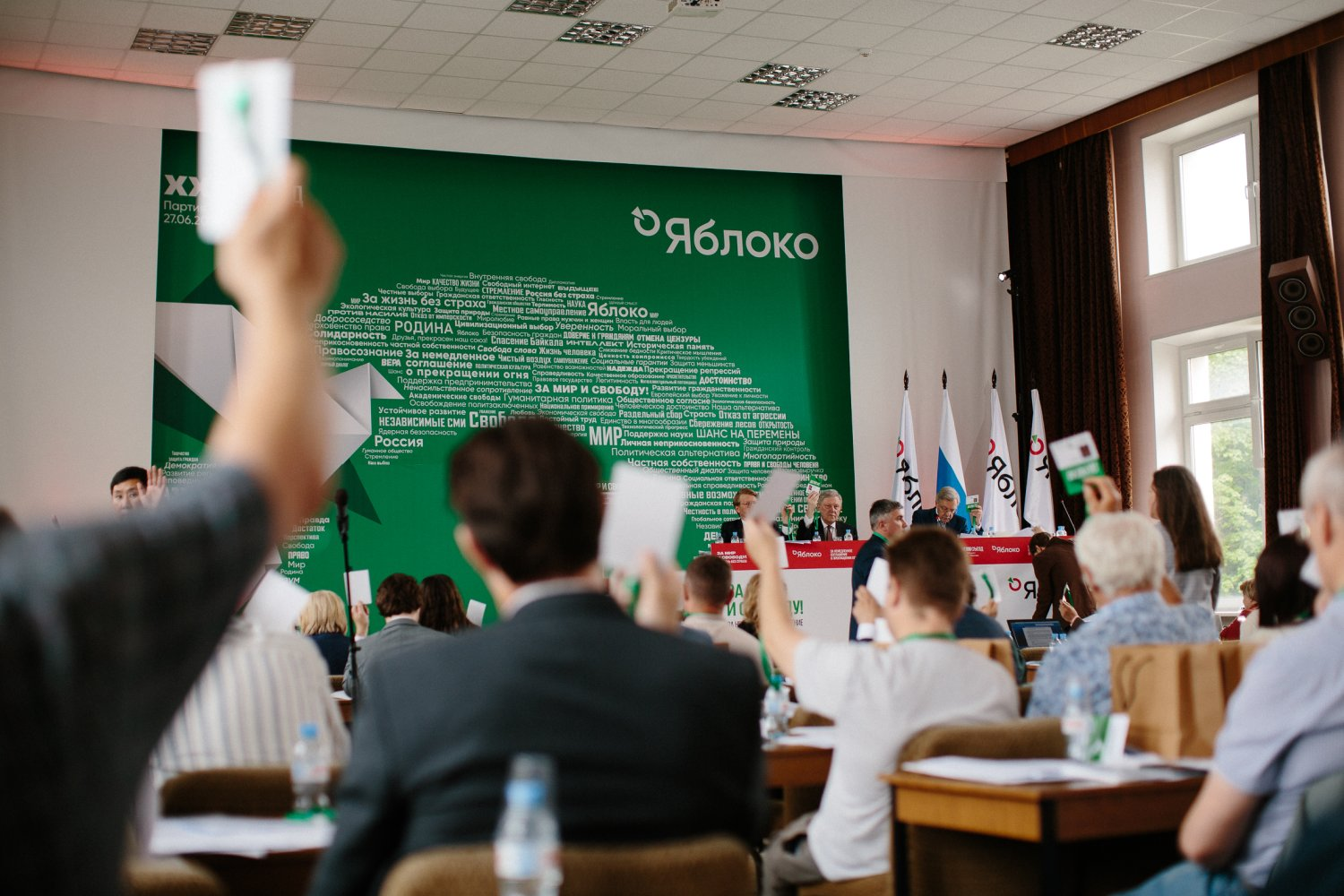
23rd Congress of the Yabloko party in Moscow under the "For Peace and Freedom" slogan.

On 13 February 2022, Yabloko published a petition against a possible war with Ukraine. Yabloko is opposing Russia's 2022 attack on Ukraine and has been taking part in protests against the war. After the beginning of the invasion, the Federal Political Committee of the party declared

"Yabloko expresses its categorical protest against the outbreak of hostilities against Ukraine. This war is Russia's war with the objective course of history, a war against time, a tragic fall from the reality of the modern world. The consequences of this war will last for a very long time, but now, first of all, it is a tragedy, suffering, and death of people, and this will never be corrected. The reason for the tragedy is lies, cruelty, and absolute indifference to the people of the Russian authorities. The Yabloko party considers the war with Ukraine to be the gravest crime. We believe that this war is contrary to the national interests of Russia and destroys the future of Russia."

On 28 February 2022, the Yabloko factions in the parliaments of Moscow, St. Petersburg, the Pskov region, and Karelia tried to initiate appeals from their legislative assemblies to President Putin with a call to immediately stop hostilities on the territory of Ukraine and start peace negotiations with international mediation, withdraw military units to places of permanent deployment, to exchange prisoners on the principle of "all for all". Several members of the Yabloko party in various regions were detained for participating in anti-war protests.

This activity of Yabloko resulted in persecutions: by July 2026 12 party members were charged with various politically-related "crimes" (five were convicted and sentenced to prison terms up to 10 years), 11 activists served short-term "administrative arrests", there were 40 searches of party offices and homes of the activists, 37 administrative protocols were issued regarding party members and followers charged with "discrediting the army", the total amount of the fines which the activists must pay is over 6,5 mln. rubles.

In June 2026, Yabloko deputy chairman Maksim Kruglov was sentenced to seven years in prison under Russia's war censorship laws for social media posts concerning civilian casualties in the Russian invasion of Ukraine. In August 2026, another Yabloko deputy chairman, Lev Shlosberg, was sentenced to 11 years and one month under the same laws for anti-war statements and a social media post.

On 10 August 2026, the Supreme Court annulled the registration of Yabloko following an appeal from Rodina, which accused the party of copyright infringement and exceeding campaign spending limits and criticizing its position on Ukraine as tantamount to calling for the violation of Russia’s territorial integrity. The decision bars the party from competing in the 2026 Russian legislative election.

== Organizational structure ==
RUDP Yabloko consists of regional branches, one per subject of the federation, regional branches from local branches, one per urban district or municipal district, local branches from primary branches, and one per urban settlement or rural settlement.

- The supreme body is the Congress, between Congresses – is the Federal Council, between the Federal Councils – is the Political Committee, the executive body is the Bureau, the highest official is the chairman, the highest control body is the Party Arbitration, the highest audit body is the Control and Auditing Commission.
- The supreme body of the regional branch is the Conference, between Conferences is the Regional Council, the executive body of the regional branch is the Bureau of the Regional Council, the highest official of the regional branch is the chairman of the regional branch, the audit body of the regional branch is the Control and Audit Commission of the regional branch.
- The supreme body of the local branch is the Conference, between Conferences – the Council of the Local Branch, the executive body of the local branch – is the Bureau of the Council of the local branch, and the highest official of the local branch is the chairman of the local branch.
- The supreme body of the primary branch is the General Meeting, between General Meetings is the Council of the primary branch, and the highest official of the primary branch is the chairman of the primary branch.

=== Leadership ===
The first chairman of the party (1995–2008) was Grigory Yavlinsky.

In 1995 Vladimir Lukin and Yury Boldyrev were elected vice-chairmen (he left Yabloko in the same year). Since 1996 Vladimir Lukin has become the first deputy chairman of the party, and Sergey Ivanenko and Vyacheslav Igrunov have been the deputies. In 2000–2001, Vladimir Lukin was again the only deputy chairman of the party. In 2001–2004, Lukin served as the first deputy chairman of the party, while the deputy chairmen were Alexei Arbatov, Igor Artemiev, Sergei Ivanenko,and Sergey Mitrokhin. In 2004–2008, the first deputy chairman of the party was Sergei Ivanenko, deputy chairmen were Alexei Arbatov, Igor Artemyev, and Sergey Mitrokhin. The posts of deputy chairman until 2007 were also presented by Sergey Popov, Galina Khovanskaya, and Irina Yarovaya. After joining the party of the Green Russia movement, the post of deputy chairman of the party in 2006–2008 was held by Alexei Yablokov.

At the XV Party Congress on 21–22 June 2008, Mitrokhin was elected the second chairman of Yabloko. In 2008–2015, the posts of deputy chairmen of the party were abolished.

The next party leadership elections were held at the XVIII Congress of Yabloko on 19–20 December 2015. Emilia Slabunova became the third chairman of the Yabloko party, and Alexander Gnezdilov, Sergei Ivanenko, and Nikolay Rybakov were elected as her deputies.

At the XXI Congress on 15 December 2019, Nikolay Rybakov was elected the new chairman of the party. Sergey Ivanenko, Boris Vishnevsky, and Ivan Bolshakov became his deputies.

No.	Leader	Took office	Left office
1	Grigory Yavlinsky	5 January 1995 (Note: Parliamentary leader from January 1994–December 2003.)	21 June 2008
2	Sergey Mitrokhin	21 June 2008	20 December 2015
3	Emilia Slabunova	20 December 2015	15 December 2019
4	Nikolay Rybakov	15 December 2019	Incumbent

==== Federal Political Committee ====
The Federal Political Committee is the collegiate governing body of the party. It formulates the party's position on major political issues between congresses; makes submissions to the party's federal bureau on key personnel appointments; makes decisions on the volumes and main directions of financing the activities of the party; organizes the work of the federal council of the party and convenes its meetings. The Federal Political Committee has the right to convene extraordinary congresses of the Party.

- Arbatov Alexei Georgievich – head of the Center for International Security of the Institute of World Economy and International Relations of the Russian Academy of Sciences, Doctor of Historical Sciences, full member of the Russian Academy of Sciences
- Artemyev Igor Yurievich – head of the Federal Antimonopoly Service of Russia, Candidate of Biological Sciences.
- Borschev Valery Vasilyevich – co-chairman of the Moscow Helsinki Group, co-chairman of the Human Rights faction of the party
- Bunimovich Yevgeny Abramovich – deputy of the Moscow City Duma, laureate of the Russian Government Prize in the field of education, Honored Teacher of Russia, Candidate of Pedagogical Sciences
- Vishnevsky Boris Lazarevich – deputy of the Legislative Assembly of St. Petersburg, publicist, political scientist, laureate of the Golden Pen of Russia award, candidate of technical sciences.
- Gannushkina Svetlana Alekseevna – human rights activist, chairman of the Civic Assistance Committee, and Right Livelihood Award winner in 2016
- Gnezdilov Alexandr Valentinovich – Theater director, artistic director of the Creative Association "Gnezdo"
- Dubrovina Elena Pavlovna – head of the Center for Legislative Initiatives of the Party, Honored Lawyer of Russia, PhD in Law
- Ivanenko Sergey Viktorovich – deputy chairman of the Party, Candidate of Economic Sciences
- Konnychev Dmitry Viktorovich – Director of the Fund for the Support of Innovative Education, Director of the private educational institution "Lyceum Boarding School of Natural Sciences", Candidate of Political Sciences
- Misnik Boris Grigorievich – coordinator of the Federal Political Committee of the Party
- Mitrokhin Sergey Sergeyevich – deputy of the Moscow City Duma, candidate of political sciences
- Rybakov Nikolay Igorevich – chairman of the Party, member of the Bureau of the Party
- Slabunova Emilia Edgardovna – deputy of the Legislative Assembly of the Republic of Karelia, Honored Teacher of Russia, Candidate of Pedagogical Sciences
- Sheinis Viktor Leonidovich – chief researcher of the Institute of World Economy and International Relations of the Russian Academy of Sciences, Doctor of Economics
- Shlosberg Lev Markovich – head of the Pskov regional branch of the party, deputy of the Pskov regional Assembly of deputies, laureate of the Golden Pen of Russia award
- Yavlinsky Grigory Alekseyevich – chairman of the Political Committee, founder and first chairman of the party, Doctor of Economics, professor at the National Research University Higher School of Economics

==== Federal Bureau ====
The Federal Bureau of the Party is the permanent governing body of the party. The Federal Bureau makes political decisions and makes statements on behalf of the party by the decisions of the Political Committee, approves the estimates of income and expenses of the party, the procedure for receiving and spending funds, and the report on their implementation by the decisions of the Political Committee, exercises the rights of a legal entity on behalf of the party and performs its duties in accordance with the party charter, and also exercises other powers in accordance with the party charter.

- Babushkin Andrei Vladimirovich – chairman of the public human rights charitable organization Committee "For Civil Rights", member of the Presidential Human Rights Council
- Boldyreva Galina Vasilievna – chairman of the Volgograd regional branch of the party, President of the Volgograd regional public organization Club "Ecology"
- Bolshakov Ivan Viktorovich – political scientist, head of the analytical department of the party
- Vishnevsky Boris Lazarevich – deputy of the Legislative Assembly of St. Petersburg, publicist, political scientist, member of the Federal Political Committee, Candidate of Technical Sciences
- Golov Anatoly Grigoryevich – head of the Social Democratic faction of the party, co-chairman of the Union of Consumers of Russia
- Goncharenko Alexander Ilyich – chairman of the Altai Regional Branch of the Party, Honorary President of the Public Monitoring Commission of the Altai Territory, laureate of the Moscow Helsinki Group Prize in the field of human rights protection
- Goncharov Kirill Alekseyevich – deputy chairman of the Moscow Regional Branch of the Party
- Goryachev Valery Sergeyevich – lawyer, head of the central apparatus of the party, executive secretary of the Bureau of the party
- Grishin Grigory Aleksandrovich – deputy chairman of the Saratov regional branch of the party, candidate of philological sciences
- Dorokhov Vladimir Yurievich – chairman of the Tula regional branch of the party
- Efimov Alexander Vladimirovich – member of the regional council of the Volgograd regional branch of the party
- Ivanenko Sergey Viktorovich – deputy chairman of the Party, member of the Federal Political Committee of the Party, Candidate of Economic Sciences
- Kolokolova Olga Arkadievna – chairman of the Perm regional branch of the party
- Kruglov Maxim Sergeyevich – head of the Yabloko faction in the Moscow City Duma, deputy chairman of the Moscow regional branch of the party, candidate of political sciences
- Mutsolgov Ruslan Adamovich – chairman of the regional branch of the party in the Republic of Ingushetia
- Maxim Petlin – deputy chairman of the Sverdlovsk regional branch of the party
- Rybakov Nikolay Igorevich – chairman of the Party, member of the Bureau of the Party
- Talevlin Andrey Aleksandrovich – ecologist, deputy chairman of the Chelyabinsk regional branch of the party
- Tsepilova Olga Dmitrievna – chairman of the faction "Green Russia" of the party, candidate of sociological sciences
- Cherepanova Anna Fedorovna – deputy of the City Duma of Veliky Novgorod, chairman of the Novgorod regional branch of the party

===== Control and Audit Commission =====
- Zinatullin Ruslan Mansurovich – chairman of the regional branch of the party in the Republic of Tatarstan
- Kushpita Dmitry Yurievich – chairman of the Vladimir regional branch of the party, former deputy of the Council of People's Deputies of Vladimir
- Monin Vadim Vladimirovich
- Shkred Tatyana Valerievna
- Lysenko Kirill Yevgenyevich

===== Exclusion of members =====
Over the entire history of the party, several prominent party members were excluded, who became prominent politicians on their own: Oksana Dmitriyeva, Alexei Navalny, Maxim Reznik, Maxim Katz, and Ilya Yashin.

The period of Sergey Mitrokhin was marked not only by the exclusion of members but also by the suspension of the powers of the regional branches. It was the case in party regional branches in Omsk, Belgorod (for cooperation with United Russia), Bryansk (for the removal of the chairman of the local branch, candidate for governor of the region Andrei Ponomarev from the elections in the interests of the current governor of the region Nikolai Denin, later accused of corruption), Krasnodar (for violating party discipline), St. Petersburg, and several other branches.

In 2020, the federal leadership of Yabloko decided to exclude the chairman of the Novosibirsk branch Svetlana Kaverzina, and three of her associates from the party. The leadership considered that they, "did not comply with the decision of the party bureau and publicly declared their disagreement with it, which caused political damage to the party". In addition to Kaverzina, Anton Nelidov, Mikhail Ryazantsev, and Vyacheslav Udintsev lost their membership in the party.

Also in 2020, the Federal Bureau of Yabloko expelled 16 other people from the party, including Maxim Katz, co-founder of the City Projects Foundation. The decision of the bureau announced that Katz tried to gain control over the Moscow branch of the party by creating an "artificial majority" of his supporters who voted unanimously. Katz announced his intention to appeal the bureau's decision.

In 2021, mass expulsions from the party as part of the "fight against katzism" and for signing open appeals of party members to the Congress continued. At least 98 members were expelled from the Moscow branch (according to one of the excluded – more than 200).

The expelled members announced that they would form a new organization, independent from the party leadership organization, as well as that the current leadership of the party "is conducting a systematic fight against civil society", "justifies the repressions" and "accuses those who fight against them". The creation of the public movement "Yabloko" was announced, with the declared aim to return the party under the control of their like-minded people or creating a new legal entity.

In addition, 189 members were denied registration, and 488 were suspended, depriving them of the right to any form of participation in internal elections. Many suspended party members consider this action to be inconsistent with the law on political parties and challenge it in court.

== Local representation ==
=== Federal authorities and advisory structures under them ===
- Andrei Babushkin (1964-2022), a former member of the Yabloko Bureau, was a member of the Presidential Human Rights Council

=== Authorities of the subjects of the Russian Federation ===
- Aslan Khapachev works as the head of the department of the Federal Antimonopoly Service of the Russian Federation in Adygea
- The ex-chairman of the Buryat Yabloko, Natalya Tumureeva holds the position of Deputy Minister of Natural Resources of the Republic of Buryatia.

=== Yabloko in the parliaments of the constituent entities of the Russian Federation ===
- Legislative Assembly of St. Petersburg – 2 deputies (Boris Vishnevskiy, Alexandr Shishlov).
- Legislative Assembly of the Republic of Karelia – 2 deputies (Emilia Slabunova, Inna Boluchevskaya).
- Pskov Oblast Assembly of Deputies – 1 deputy (Artur Gaiduk).

== Election results ==
=== Presidential election ===
Election	Candidate	First round		Second round		Result
Election	Candidate	Votes	%	Votes	%	Result
1996	Grigory Yavlinsky	5,550,752	7.34			Lost ✗
2000	Grigory Yavlinsky	4,351,452	5.80			Lost ✗
2004	Didn't nominate a candidate					
2008	Endorsed Vladimir Bukovsky	Not admitted to the elections				
2012	Grigory Yavlinsky	Not admitted to the elections				
2018	Grigory Yavlinsky	769,644	1.05			Lost ✗
2024	Didn't nominate a candidate					

=== State Duma elections ===
Election	Party leader	Performance					Rank	Government
Election	Party leader	Votes	%	± pp	Seats	+/–	Rank	Government
1993	Grigory Yavlinsky	4,233,219	7.86	New	27 / 450	New	5th	Opposition
1995	Grigory Yavlinsky	4,767,384	6.89	▼0.97	45 / 450	▲18	▲4th	Opposition (Note: Some members of the party (Mikhail Zadornov as Minister of Finance in 1997–1999, Oksana Dmitriyeva as Minister of Labour and Social Protection in Apr.-Sep. 1998) participated in the government on an individual basis, for which they were expelled from the party.)
1999	Grigory Yavlinsky	3,955,611	5.93	▼0.96	20 / 450	▼25	▼5th	Opposition
2003	Grigory Yavlinsky	2,610,087	4.30	▼1.63	4 / 450	▼16	5th	Opposition
2007	Grigory Yavlinsky	1,108,985	1.59	▼2.71	0 / 450	▼4	▼6th	Extra-parliamentary
2011	Sergey Mitrokhin	2,252,403	3.43	▲1.84	0 / 450	0	▲5th	Extra-parliamentary
2016	Emilia Slabunova	1,051,335	1.99	▼1.44	0 / 450	0	▼6th	Extra-parliamentary
2021	Nikolay Rybakov	753,280	1.34	▼0.65	0 / 450	0	▼7th	Extra-parliamentary
2026	Nikolay Rybakov	TBD						

=== Regional parliamentary elections ===
Regional parliaments of Russia in which Yabloko is represented.

Regional Parliament	Election year & amount of seats	Current seats		Next Election
Regional Parliament	Election year & amount of seats	#	Position	Next Election
Regional Parliament	2026	#	Position	Next Election
Novgorod Oblast	1	1 / 32	#2 (Note: Tied with other parties.)	2031

==== Election results (regional) ====
Following the results of the elections on 4 December 2011 to the regional parliaments, Yabloko formed its own factions in three regions: St. Petersburg (6 seats out of 50 in the Legislative Assembly of St. Petersburg: Grigory Yavlinsky became the head of the faction), Karelia (4 seats out of 50 in the Legislative Assembly of the Republic of Karelia), Pskov Region (1 deputy seat out of 44 in the Pskov Regional Assembly of Deputies). In the elections on 4 December 2011, the Yabloko party received 6.72% of votes on party lists to the Pskov Regional Assembly of Deputies, to the Legislative Assembly of the Republic of Karelia – 7.13% of the votes, to the Legislative Assembly of St. Petersburg – 12 .50%.

== Ideology ==
=== Political memorandum ===
In 2015, Yabloko adopted a Political Memorandum, which is a summary of the party's ideology. The new version of the memorandum was adopted in 2019. The document, in support of its provisions, must be signed by Yabloko candidates in elections at all levels.

Contents of the memorandum:

1. Our country needs deep and comprehensive political reforms aimed at moving from an authoritarian system of power to a real separation of powers, independent, fair and merciful justice, full-fledged local self-government, transparency of the legislative and executive authorities and their accountability to citizens, to fair elections and depoliticization of law enforcement agencies.
2. Bolshevism and Stalinism are misanthropic ideologies and practices. The state must give a legal assessment of the coup d'état of 1917–1918 and the heinous crimes that followed.
3. Nationalism and religious fundamentalism in any form and manifestation are unacceptable.
4. The transition from an authoritarian regime to a democratic one must be peaceful, non-violent and carried out in a legal, constitutional way.
5. An immediate cessation of the arms race, a renunciation of state propaganda for war, militarization of the country, threats and intimidation in foreign policy is necessary.
6. It is necessary to completely separate business and property from the authorities (which were merged due to the erroneous policies of the 1990s and 2000s), and to refuse to support oligarchic business from the budget. The transition from a resource-based economy to a modern high-tech economy is obligatory.
7. It is necessary openly and publicly investigate all facts of corruption in the Government, the Presidential Administration, law enforcement agencies, state companies and state corporations. The perpetrators must be punished, whoever it may concern.
8. Political repressions must be stopped, all repressive laws restricting human rights and freedoms, enshrined in the second chapter of the Constitution of the Russian Federation (including the anti-orphan law, restriction of the right to rallies, conferring the status of a "foreign agent" on NGOs and the law on undesirable foreign organizations) must be abolished. It is necessary to abolish censorship in the media, social networks and culture, stop the arbitrary blocking the Internet resources.
9. Russia must recognize the sovereignty of Ukraine within the 2013 borders, stop supporting crime and separatists, inciting hatred and propaganda for war. The solution of the Crimean issue is possible in accordance with the road map developed within the framework of a specially convened international conference.
10. A worthy and successful future for Russia can only be based on the values of freedom, human rights, the principles of democracy, the rule of law and the inviolability of private property.

==== The process of ideological self-determination of the party ====
Yabloko arose and developed in line with the democratic movement as an alliance of political groups representing various ideological currents – liberals, social democrats, Christian democrats. In the process of forming the party, it was necessary to decide what "niche" in the party-political spectrum it would occupy – whether it would eventually become a social democratic or liberal party. It was also necessary to decide which particular formula of liberalism could most accurately express its ideological credo. The decisive factor that influenced this decision was the attitude to the ongoing changes in the country.

At the II Congress of Yabloko (September 1995), the program document "The Path of Russian Reforms" was adopted, containing a negative assessment of the first results of Russian reforms, which were characterized as follows:

- politics – authoritarian tendencies, accompanied by disorganization and disorder;
- economy – the foundation for economic growth has not been created;
- society – growing discontent and disappointment due to the deterioration of the social situation and a sharp drop in living standards.

The congress document formulated a fundamental vision of the reforms – that they should be carried out in the interests of the majority of the population.

The idea was put forward to return control powers to the parliament and thus eliminate the possibility of one authority appropriating the powers of another. The advancement of these principles meant the establishment of Yabloko as a political association of a social-liberal type.

==== "Yabloko" about Russian specifics ====
According to the founders of the Yabloko party, European models of liberalism are preferable to American ones. Recognizing the civilizational, socio-cultural specifics of Russia, the leaders of Yabloko insisted on the need to take it into account when implementing reforms. This specificity primarily includes the traditionally high role of the state in the economic life of the country, the steady orientation of significant sections of the population towards ensuring that state institutions provide social assistance. Analyzing the features of the socio-economic and historical evolution of Russia, representatives of Yabloko paid special attention to disproportions in the development of our country. For the success of the reforms, it is necessary to eliminate these disproportions, which is possible only with an effective regulatory role of the state.

==== Social democracy ====
Among the founders of Yabloko was a group of social democrats, but as a result of the discussion, it was initially decided not to identify themselves social democrats. In this regard, Grigory Yavlinsky noted:

Our ideological model is based on the need to combine liberal and social democratic approaches in Russia. This is a feature of Russia, in which we must be liberals in order to protect private property, achieve tax cuts, maximum freedoms for entrepreneurs, large-scale development of private entrepreneurship, because without this it is impossible to create a “public pie”. But we must not forget that Russia is a country that cannot exist without free education, without high-quality free healthcare. We cannot forget how many pensioners we have, how many people with disabilities, how many territories we have that today do not yet fit into the liberal approach ... We must do everything to ensure that the liberal foundations of the economy are as deep as possible, and at the same time solve the country's priority social tasks.

In the first half of the 1990s, the ideas of socialism were generally not popular in the democratic movement. Yabloko's distancing from social democracy was manifested in the party's attitude to such a principle as social justice. In 1995, Grigory Yavlinsky said:

The social justice thesis is one of the most dangerous theses that can exist. It has been proven many times that the struggle for social justice sooner or later ends in terrible tragedies. Therefore, for our country, the thesis would be correct not about social justice, but about social acceptability. This is a dynamic situation, which suggests that at different stages, under different conditions, society can agree with certain social costs. Especially during the period of reforms. And if, instead of organizing an efficient economy, we again begin to seek justice, while realizing that it does not exist, that this is an abstract thesis, we will again and again push people into social conflicts.

==== Land – Housing – Roads ====
A book with a program titled "Land – Housing – Roads" was distributed by the party. To the housing issue: a breakthrough strategy contains a description of the strategy “Land – housing – roads”, approved by decision No. 10 February 28, 2009 of the Political Committee of the RODP “Yabloko”. The strategy is positioned by the party as aimed at a comprehensive withdrawal of the country from the crisis.

In the period after the publication, the program was a permanent part of the Yabloko party election program.

=== LGBT Politics ===
The party consistently advocates for protection of the rights of LGBT people in Russia as well as other human rights systematically repressed in Russia.

== Politics ==
=== Yukos ===
On 22 April 2005, in connection with the completion of the trial of Mikhail Khodorkovsky and Platon Lebedev, Grigory Yavlinsky issued an open statement in which he indicated:

"This process has nothing to do with strengthening the rule of law in the country, or at least establishing some kind of order ... Instead, it created an atmosphere of intimidation and legal chaos in the country ... The number of procedural violations during the process exceeded all possible limits, and the consequences of this will take a very long time to overcome. Probably, since the time of Stalin and the shooting within "anti-thieves" decrees of Khrushchev in the 1950s. The right was not violated so revealingly and rudely. And after such a high-profile precedent, this will have fatal consequences for thousands of entrepreneurs across the country".

According to Yavlinsky, when organizing the trial, the Russian authorities set three goals: to prevent the sale of Yukos to foreigners, to intimidate and subjugate Russian big business, and to put Yukos under the control of a certain group of government officials. Wherein:

"Since none of the objectives could be achieved by legal means..., brute force was used, under the guise of, as far as possible, quasi-legal procedures".

Yavlinsky believes that with this process “the political elite of the country begins a new stage: physical persecution and, possibly, destruction of each other ... This is a war that has no end. Its goal is the destruction of people from the highest echelons of power and business, current and former, the destruction of the fate of their loved ones and families.”

"Such a wheel can only be rolled – and it cannot be stopped. Repressions – revenge, new repressions – new revenge. Is it really not clear that the current top will be the same in a few years ...? Stalin's bloody 20 years showed that repressions within the political class are continuous and pointless – everyone lives in an atmosphere of fear of the future. Because if our country smells the smell of repression and blood, it will not stop for a long time. The execution of 1993 and the subsequent war of 1994, which lasted for more than 10 years, is from this area ... The imprisonment of Khodorkovsky and Lebedev is the way into repression and revenge. After that, no one can feel safe anymore – neither the accused, nor the accusers, nor the members of their families. This is the path to self-destruction of the nation and the country. The political class and top business in Russia must understand that the day the verdict of imprisonment is announced is the actual beginning of physical mutual destruction ... <...> Without a doubt, only President Putin can make a decision. It is necessary to proceed from reality – the outcome of the Yukos case, the imprisonment or not of Khodorkovsky, as well as the term of this imprisonment, entirely depend on the decision of Vladimir Putin. He actually bears political and moral responsibility for it. It is not necessary, taking advantage of your position of power, to put your opponents (or opponents of your entourage) in prison. And so much has already happened to make the situation irreversible, but in the main thing – as far as people's lives are concerned, there is still an opportunity to stop.

=== Chechen conflict ===
According to the Yabloko party, the Chechen problem is very complicated and ambiguous. It was provoked, according to the party, by the wrong policy of the Russian leadership, which dragged Russia into a protracted bloody conflict that claimed hundreds of thousands of lives and created conditions for criminal business in Chechnya. The Chechen war caused very high military spending and also threatened the safety of many people. After the defeat of the Supreme Soviet in 1993, Yeltsin needed, according to the party, a "small victorious war" that would provide an excellent opportunity to show the power of power. In addition, at that time the power of the Chechen criminal communities on Russian territory increased enormously, and Dzhokhar Dudayev greatly weakened his position by his actions.

The Yabloko party, however, believes that restoring constitutional order is one thing, but demonstrating strength is another. Especially when this demonstration is carried out to distract the people from the socio-economic crisis in the country. 29 November 1994 Russian president Boris Yeltsin issued an ultimatum to all forces in Chechnya. On 5 December, Yabloko gathered a delegation ready to replace Russian tankmen prisoners of war – officers and soldiers of the Kantemirovskaya division, who participated in the unsuccessful attempt to storm Grozny on 26 November, allegedly carried out by anti-Dudaev opposition forces as hostages. Dzhokhar Dudayev agreed to meet with Russian deputies, including Grigory Yavlinsky and Sergei Yushenkov. The deputies arrived in Grozny, but the negotiation process was disrupted – according to Yavlinsky, this happened because "the negotiations were not part of the authorities' plan for a small victorious war." The peaceful initiatives of Yabloko were not accepted by either the broad masses or the State Duma. The majority of the Duma deputies refused to consider the bill "On delegations for the settlement of the armed conflict in the Chechen Republic".

The "easy war", however, did not work out – it hit the whole society hard. The capture of Grozny by militants in March 1996, a year after the city was taken by federal troops, demonstrated the weakness of the federal troops, which then led to the Khasavyurt agreements. The only faction that supported the Khasavyurt agreements was the Yabloko faction. Three years later, during the impeachment of Boris Yeltsin, Yabloko formulated its position as follows:

"... Responsibility for this war lies not only with Yeltsin and Dudayev's regime. It is also borne by the military leaders who gave and carried out criminal orders, the head of the government, Chernomyrdin, his deputies, ministers, bear this guilt and politicians, some of whom supported this war, others did not want to stop, and still others could not. However, we, Yabloko, are also responsible, because we did not do everything possible, not all of our resources were devoted to stopping the slaughter. Since no one can fix what happened, there is only one responsibility – to create such conditions under which what happened will never happen again. We, Yabloko, consider ourselves obligated to do everything possible to minimize the likelihood of such tragedies recurring in the future. Today we are obliged to create a precedent for punishing the authorities for crimes. The inevitable responsibility and punishability of the authorities for crimes against their own people is real democracy."

However, a long-term peace did not work out, and as a result, events quickly escalated into the Second Chechen War. Nevertheless, even then Yabloko advocated the possibility of negotiations. In October 2002, during the seizure of hostages by Chechen terrorists in the theater center on Dubrovka in Moscow, one of the demands of the bandits was the participation of Grigory Yavlinsky in the negotiations. After the tragedy, Grigory Yavlinsky made a statement that expressed the official point of view of the Yabloko party:

"We firmly believe that there can be no justification for terrorism – neither political, nor religious, nor by good causes, not even by so-called "symmetrical and retaliatory" measures, or any other. There is no justification for killing or threatening, blackmailing by killing innocent, defenseless people. In this sense, the cause of terrorism is not poverty or suffering, and not even revenge (which is directed at the guilty), but boundless meanness ... Undoubtedly, those who embark on the path of terror must be brought to justice or, if this is not possible, eliminated. However, what happened with a new acuteness raises the question of resolving the armed conflict in Chechnya, of ending the cleansings, torture, kidnappings, extrajudicial killings, bullying, unlimited physical violence – in essence, the cessation of the most brutal war to exterminate an entire people. All efforts to find political ways to end the war are required to be repeatedly intensified. All lessons must be learned from this tragedy."

=== The death penalty ===
Yabloko advocates the complete abolition of the death penalty in Russia. After on 10 February 2013, the head of the Ministry of Internal Affairs of Russia, Vladimir Kolokoltsev, in an interview with the program Saturday Vesti of the TV channel Russia-1 said that he had nothing against the return of the death penalty in Russia, this caused severe criticism from the party, on the website of which there was a proposal to send the minister to resign.

=== LGBT rights ===
The Yabloko party has repeatedly advocated for the rights of the LGBT community. On 5 April 2012, activists of the Amur branch of the party organized a rally for the rights of LGBT people agreed with the authorities. In 2016, the St. Petersburg branch of the party included items on support for LGBT people in the program, and in 2017, in the program of the electoral association "Yabloko Party in Moscow" during the elections of deputies of representative bodies of local self-government in the city of Moscow, it was recorded that that party candidates oppose discrimination based on sexual orientation. Also in 2016, the pre-election plan for the legislative work of the Yabloko faction in the State Duma included a clause on the need to repeal the law on liability for "propaganda of non-traditional sexual relations". The need to repeal this law was also discussed on the party's pre-election website. And the federal program of the party declared the need to develop "such forms of interpersonal support as a civil partnership that allows people who are not related to each other to provide each other with mutual support and assistance, providing citizens who enter into such a partnership with the opportunity to visit each other in a hospital, joint ownership property, inheritance, etc." The youth and gender factions of the Yabloko party have repeatedly made statements and held actions in support of the rights of the LGBT community.

Some well-known Yabloko supporters, including Galina Mikhaleva, Maxim Reznik and Aleksey Melnikov, support LGBT people. "Protection against discrimination of the LGBT community" was identified in 2011 as one of the new areas of work for the gender faction. Members of the Moscow Yabloko took part in the events of the Week Against Homophobia in 2011, and the Moscow Youth Yabloko issued a special statement in support of it. Also, Youth Yabloko planned to participate in the Equality March in 2011. Party leaders Sergei Mitrokhin and Grigory Yavlinsky have repeatedly condemned homophobia. Nikolai Kavkazsky, a member of the Youth Yabloko, noted that "the gay parade is not a carnival, but a human rights event <...> which should be held more often than once a year". However, LGBT support is not included in the party program.

Deputy of the State Duma of the III convocation Alexander Fedulov, head of the Kursk party organization of Yabloko, in the summer of 2011 appealed to the President of Russia Dmitry Medvedev with an appeal to "protect the moral and spiritual health of the absolute majority of Russians from the aggressive, impudent" pink-and-blue "minority", after which he was criticized by Sergei Mitrokhin, who noted that "In a civilized state, the rights of citizens must be respected regardless of their nationality, social class and sexual orientation."

Sergei Mitrokhin at the same time called on the LGBT community to refrain from holding gay pride parades "provoking part of the Russian society to aggression and violence – against not only the participants in the parades themselves, but in general all citizens of non-traditional sexual orientation".

Later, Alexander Fedulov was expelled from the party "for repeated public statements and statements of a nationalist and misanthropic nature, as well as support for the leadership of an authoritarian-oligarchic corrupt regime".

On 2 April 2017, the party adopted a statement on the inadmissibility of the genocide of the LGBT community in the Chechen Republic.

On 28 March 2019, the position of the Yabloko party against LGBT discrimination was published on the official website of the party. In it, the party refers to its program documents and documents of international organizations to which it is a member. The party stated that:

The protection of human rights in relation to representatives of the LGBT community is one of the important areas of the human rights activities of the Yabloko party.

== See also ==
- Liberal democracy
- Liberalism in Russia
- Grigory Yavlinsky
- Russian Opposition
