= Valentin Martemyanov =

Russian politician, lawyer, and professor (1932 – 1994)

- Валентин Мартемьянов

Member of the State Duma
- In office 1993 – 5 November 1994

Personal details
- Born: Valentin Semyonovich Martemyanov; 7 March 1932 Moscow, Soviet Union
- Died: 5 November 1994 (aged 62) Moscow, Russia
- Party: Communist Party of the Russian Federation

Valentin Semyonovich Martemyanov (Russian: Валентин Семёнович Мартемьянов; 7 March 1932 - 5 November 1994), was a Russian politician, lawyer, and professor, who was a member of the State Duma of the first convocation from 1993 to 1994.

== Biography ==
Valentin Martemyanov was born in Moscow on 7 March 1932.

In 1949, he entered the Faculty of Law of Moscow State University.

In 1968, he defended his Ph.D. thesis on the topic “Division of judicial and administrative responsibility in civil cases.”.

Since 1968, he taught at the All-Union Correspondence Institute of Law, first as an assistant professor, and since 1982 he has been a professor in the department of civil law.

In 1981, he defended his doctoral dissertation on the topic “Problems of legal regulation of the activities of local councils in the field of property relations.”.

In 1988, he headed the department of economic law.

He worked in practical work in law enforcement and enforcement agencies: assistant district prosecutor and prosecutor of the department for supervision of consideration of civil cases in courts of the Yaroslavl Region Prosecutor's Office, investigator of the Moscow district prosecutor's office, prosecutor of the department for supervision of consideration of civil cases in courts of the Moscow Prosecutor's Office and the RSFSR Prosecutor's Office, consultant reception room of the Chairman of the Presidium of the Supreme Soviet of the RSFSR.

In 1993, Martemyanov was elected to the State Duma of the Russian Federation from the Communist Party of the Russian Federation faction. He was a member of the Committee on Property, Privatization and Economic Activities.

On 1 November 1994, he was brutally beaten and robbed at his entrance, and died on 5 November in the hospital from his wounds. Neither the customers nor the perpetrators of the murder were found.

He was buried at Troekurovskoye Cemetery.
