= Alexei Arbatov =

Russian politician

- Алексей Арбатов
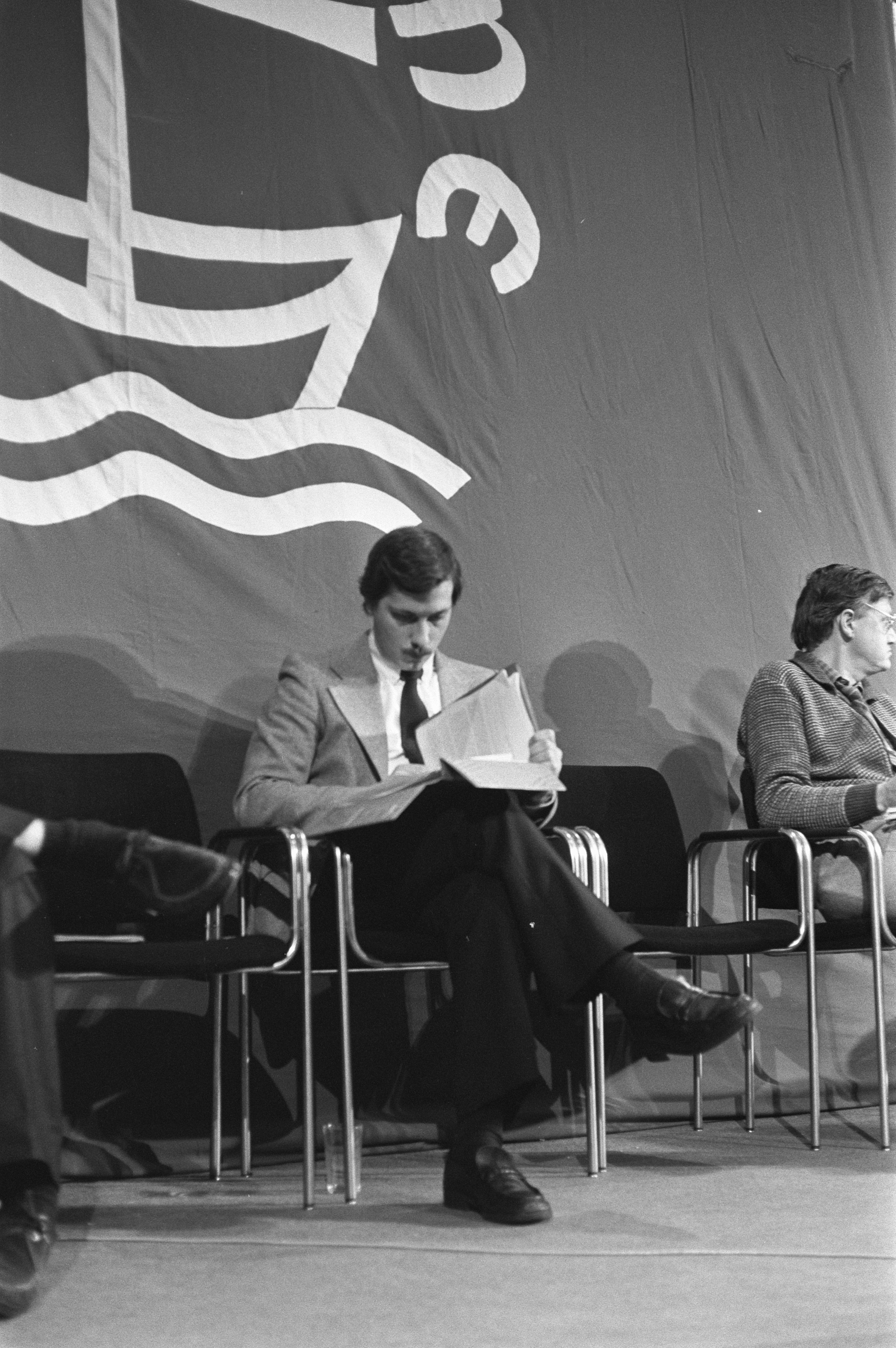
- Arbatov in 1981
- Born: Alexei Georgievich Arbatov; Алексей Георгиевич Арбатов; January 17, 1951 (age 75); Russia
- Education: MA, PhD Moscow State Institute of International Relations (MGIMO)
- Occupations: Political scientist Politician; Author
- Political party: Yabloko (social liberal)

Alexei Georgievich Arbatov (Russian: Алексей Георгиевич Арбатов; born January 17, 1951) is a full member of the Russian Academy of Sciences, the Head of the Center for International Security at the Institute of World Economy and International Relations (IMEMO), and a scholar in residence at the Carnegie Moscow Center. He is a Russian political scientist, academic, author, and former politician.

Born in Russia, Arbatov graduated from the Moscow State Institute of International Relations (MGIMO), and completed graduate and post-graduate studies at the Institute of World Economy and International Relations (IMEMO) and MGIMO. He has spent nearly 40 years in the academic and scientific communities, and also served for over a decade in Russia's parliament. He is one of Russia's foremost experts in the fields of international relations, foreign and military policy, international security, and arms control and disarmament.

== Personal life and education ==
Arbatov was born in Moscow, Russia on January 17, 1951. He is the son of Georgy Arkadyevich Arbatov, a highly distinguished Soviet and Russian academic and decorated veteran of the Great Patriotic War, the Russian front of World War II. Alexei Arbatov studied international relations at the Moscow State Institute of International Relations (MGIMO), also father Georgy's alma mater, and graduated in 1973 with distinction.

After graduating from MGIMO, Arbatov began graduate studies at the Institute of World Economy and International Relations (IMEMO) in Moscow. He defended his graduate dissertation in 1976 and earned a Candidate of Sciences, or "Kandidat," degree—the Russian education system's equivalent of a PhD. Arbatov then pursued post-doctoral studies at MGIMO. After successful defense of a second dissertation in 1982, he earned a Doctor of Sciences in History degree and the title of "Doctor of Historical Studies".

Arbatov is married to Nadezhda Arbatova, a fellow political scientist and MGIMO alumna. The couple has one daughter together, Ekaterina, who is also a graduate of MGIMO.

== Academic and scientific career ==
Most of Arbatov's academic and scientific work has spanned strategic, political, and military-economic aspects of international security, foreign policy and defense, and arms limitation and reduction.

=== Institute of World Economy and International Relations (IMEMO) ===
Arbatov has spent the majority of his academic and scientific career at the Institute of World Economy and International Relations (IMEMO) in Moscow, where he now heads the Center for International Security. In 2011, he was elected as a full member to the Russian Academy of Sciences, the parent organization that includes IMEMO.

Since joining IMEMO in 1976, Arbatov has served as researcher, senior researcher, leading specialist, sector head, and department head. He is a member of the IMEMO Scientific Council, the Institute of USA and Canada Studies, and the Institute of Europe. Arbatov is a member of the boards of editors of the Russia in Global Affairs and Science and Global Security journals.

Arbatov is also a member of the Research Council of the Russian Ministry of Foreign Affairs, Russia's Government Expert Council, the Russian Council for Foreign and Defense Policy, and the Russian International Affairs Council.

=== Carnegie Moscow Center ===
Since 2004, Arbatov has been a scholar in residence at the Carnegie Moscow Center, the top-rated think tank in Russia and Moscow-based regional affiliate of the Carnegie Endowment for International Peace. He chairs Carnegie Moscow Center's Nonproliferation Program, regularly writes for the Endowment's publications and blogs, and moderates and contributes to the Endowment's seminars and conferences.

=== International work and cooperation ===
Arbatov has participated in many joint research projects with foreign experts on issues of strategic offensive and defensive weapons and compliance with international treaties on arms control.

Arbatov has been a member of numerous advisory boards, including the Governing Board of the Stockholm International Peace Research Institute, the board of the Center for Nonproliferation Studies at the Monterey Institute of International Studies, the advisory board of the Geneva Centre for Security Policy (GCSP), the International Advisory Board of the Geneva Centre for the Democratic Control of Armed Forces (DCAF), the board of directors of the Nuclear Threat Initiative (NTI), and is the vice president of the International Luxembourg Forum on Preventing Nuclear Catastrophe.

Arbatov was also a member of the International Commission on Nuclear Non-proliferation and Disarmament and the Weapons of Mass Destruction Commission.

== Political career ==
Arbatov played a leading role in the politics of post-Soviet Russia. He was a member of the Soviet delegation to START I negotiations, a bi-lateral treaty on the Reduction and Limitation of Strategic Offensive Arms that was signed in 1991 between the United States and the Soviet Union. Following the break-up of the Soviet Union, he served for over a decade in Russia's Federal Assembly, or parliament.

=== State Duma member ===
From 1994 to 2003, he was a member of the Russian State Duma, the lower house of the Federal Assembly, and served in on various committees. Arbatov's three terms in office spanned the first three iterations of the newly formed State Duma:

- 1993–1995 – State Duma member
- 1995-1995 – State Duma member, member of the Defense Committee, Chairman of the Subcommittee for International Security and Arms Limitations
- 1999–2003 – State Duma member, Deputy Chairman of the Defense Committee, Head of the Commission for Defense, Security and Ratification of International Treaties

Arbatov initiated and/or drafted several Russian laws during his tenure in the State Duma:

- "On Civil Control and Management over Military Organization and Activity in the Russian Federation"
- "On the Financing of the Strategic Nuclear Arms Forces of the Russian Federation for the Period up to 2001"
- "On Amendments and Additions to the Federal Law, "On the Federal Budget for 1999""
- "On the Status of Participants in Armed Conflicts and Combatants"
- "On Civil Control and Management over Military Organization and Activity in the Russian Federation"

Arbatov also initiated several inquiries as a State Duma Deputy, including:

- Inquiry on non-implementation of the law, "On Social Protection of Citizens Exposed to Radiation Due to the Chernobyl Disaster" and Government Resolution "On the Procedure for Providing Compensation and Concessions to Individuals Subjected to Radiation"
- Inquiry regarding the failure of the government to determine a mechanism for taking the border registration fee, envisaged by the law "On the State Border"
- Request for the urgent submission to the State Duma of the concept and development programs, reductions, and use of nuclear weapons and corresponding expenditures. Without these materials, it would have been impossible to prepare for ratification of START II in 1993.

=== Injury in Chechnya ===
A handful of Russia's ethnic minority-dominated regions—such as Chechnya, Dagestan, and Ingushetia—saw violent activities against the Moscow government following the break-up of the Soviet Union. As a member of the State Duma's Defense Committee, Arbatov frequently traveled to these regions to assess the situations.

During one such visit in 2001, Arbatov was traveling through Chechnya with Evgeny Zelenov, another State Duma member, when their Mi-8 helicopter came under a heavy machinegun fire ambush. Arbatov was injured during the attack, as were Zelenov, the aircraft's pilot, and a crew member. The pilot, Podpolkovnik (Lieutenant Colonel) Leonid Konstantinov, later died of his injuries.

=== Yabloko political party ===
Outside of his career in the State Duma, Arbatov served as vice chairman of the Russian United Democratic Party (Yabloko)--social liberal political party—from 2001 to 2008. Arbatov has served as a member of the Yabloko Political Committee from 2008 to the present.

== Awards and honors ==
- Certificate of Honor of the President of the Russian Federation (12 December 2009) — for significant contribution to the development of the National Security Strategy of the Russian Federation until 2020 and the Fundamentals of Strategic Planning.
- Government of the Russian Federation Media Award (2016) (3 December 2016) — for the promotion of foreign policy issues in the journal Russia in Global Affairs.
- E. V. Tarle Prize — for the collection Security and Arms Control 2015–2016: International Cooperation in Combating Global Threats.

== Publications ==
Arbatov is an author and editor of many publications on issues of global security, strategic stability, disarmament, Russian military reform, and various current domestic and foreign political issues.

=== Books ===
- Missile Defense: Confrontation and Cooperation (2013)
- Nuclear Reset: Arms Reduction and Nonproliferation (2012)
- 20 Years Without the Berlin Wall: A Breakthrough to Freedom (2011)
- Outer Space: Weapons, Diplomacy, and Security (2010)
- Equation Security (2010)
- Nuclear Proliferation: New Technologies, Weapons, Treaties (2009)
- Beyond Nuclear Deterrence: Transforming the US-Russian Equation (2006)
- Defense and Security of Russia (2004)

=== Monographs ===
- Security: Russian Option (1999)
- Russian National Idea and Foreign Policy (1998)
- Military Reform in Russia: Dilemmas, Obstacles and Prospects (1997, in English)
- Defensive Sufficiency and Security (1990)
- Deadly boundaries: The Soviet View of Nuclear Strategy, and Arms Negotiations (1988, in English)
- Military-Strategic Parity and the Policy of the USA (1984)
- Security in the Nuclear Age and the Policy of Washington (1980)
