= 2nd State Duma =

Convocation of the lower house of Russian parliament

(Russia) State Duma of the Russian Federation of the 2nd convocation
←	1st State Duma	3rd State Duma	→
- Seat composition of the 2nd State Duma

Overview
- Meeting place: State Duma building Moscow, Okhotny Ryad street, 1
- Term: 17 January 1996 – 24 December 1999
- Election: 1995 parliamentary election
- Government: 27 committees
- Website: State Duma
- Members: 450
- Chairman: Gennady Seleznyov (from Communist Party)

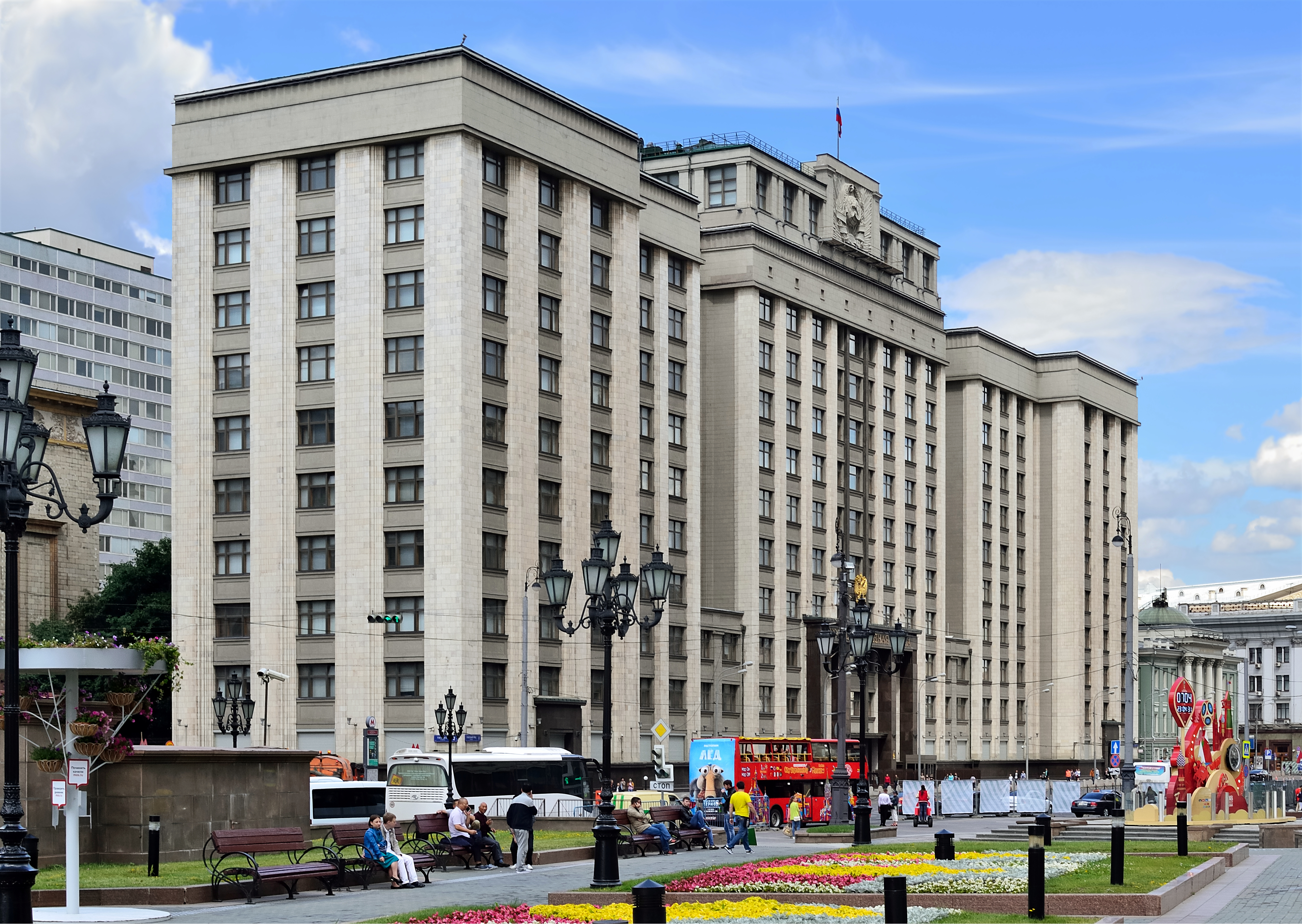
Modern building of the State Duma.

The State Duma of the Federal Assembly of the Russian Federation of the 2nd convocation (Russian: Государственная Дума Федерального Собрания Российской Федерации II созыва) is a former convocation of the State Duma, Lower House of the Russian Parliament. The 2nd convocation meets at the State Duma building in Moscow, worked from December 17, 1995 – December 19, 1999.

== Leadership ==
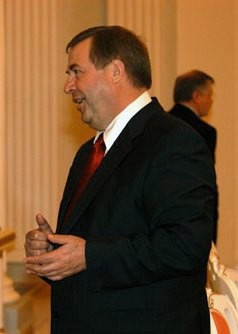
Gennadiy Seleznyov – Chairman of the State Duma on the 2nd convocation.

The first meeting of the 2nd State Duma was moderated by the oldest deputy, 73 year-old Grigory Galaziy.

Office	MP	Period	Parliamentary affiliation
Chairman	Gennady Seleznyov	17 January 1996 – 18 January 2000	Communist Party
First Deputy Chairmen	Alexander Shokhin	18 January 1996–5 September 1997	Our Home – Russia
First Deputy Chairmen	Vladimir Ryzhkov	10 September 1997–3 February 1999	Our Home – Russia
First Deputy Chairmen	Boris Kuznetsov	17 February 1999–18 January 2000	Our Home – Russia
Deputy Chairmen	Sergey Baburin	18 January 1996–18 January 2000	Narodovlastie
Deputy Chairmen	Svetlana Goryacheva	18 January 1996–18 January 2000	Communist Party
Deputy Chairmen	Mikhail Gutseriyev	18 January 1996–18 January 2000	Liberal Democratic Party
Deputy Chairmen	Artur Chilingarov	18 January 1996–18 January 2000	Russian Regions
Deputy Chairmen	Mikhail Yuryev	20 March 1996–18 January 2000	Yabloko

=== Chairman election ===
On January 17, 1996, the parliament elected Gennady Seleznyov as the Chairman of the State Duma.

Candidate	First ballot		Second ballot		Third ballot	
Candidate	Votes	%	Votes	%	Votes	%
✓ Gennady Seleznyov (CPRF)	216	48.0%	219	48.7%	231	51.3%
Ivan Rybkin (IND) (incumbent)	166	36.9%	51	11.3%	150	33.3%
Vladimir Lukin (Yabloko)	56	12.4%			50	11.1%
Other	8	1.8%	5	1.1%	11	2.4%

== Factions and groups ==
Faction	Seats
Communist Party of the Russian Federation	139
Our Home – Russia	65
Liberal Democratic Party of Russia	49
Yabloko	45
Russian Regions – Independent MPs	44
Narodovlastie	41
Agrarian Deputy Group	35
Independent MPs	19
Democratic Choice of Russia	6
Vacant	7

== Major legislation ==
Five Prime Ministers were approved by the State Duma of the second convocation.

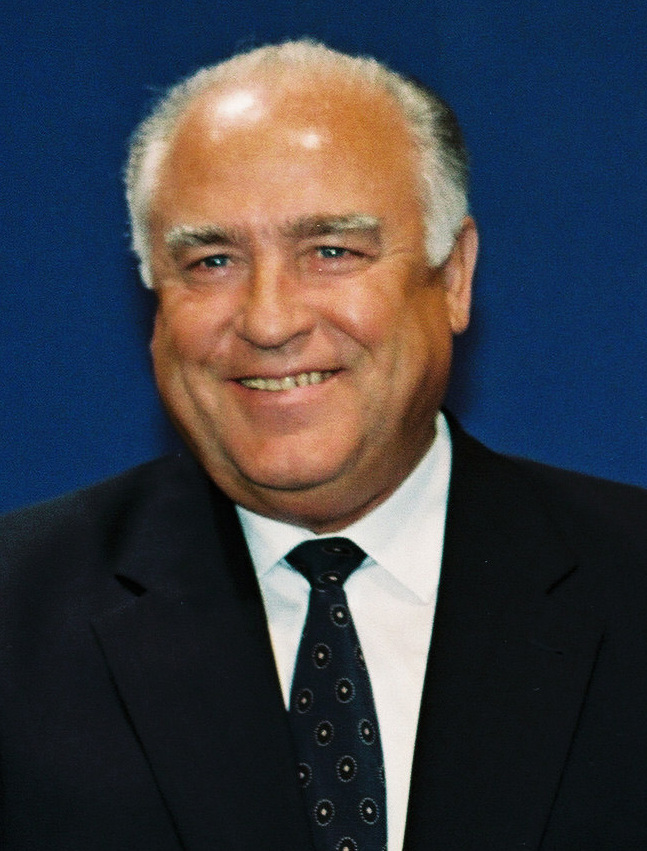
Viktor Chernomyrdin

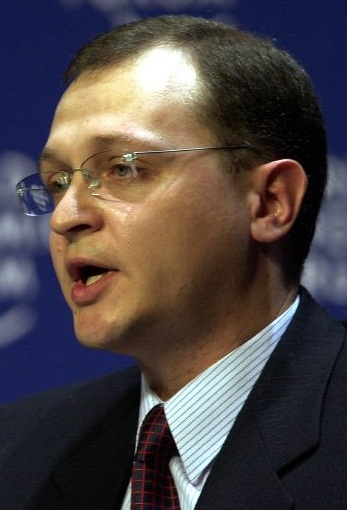
Sergei Kiriyenko

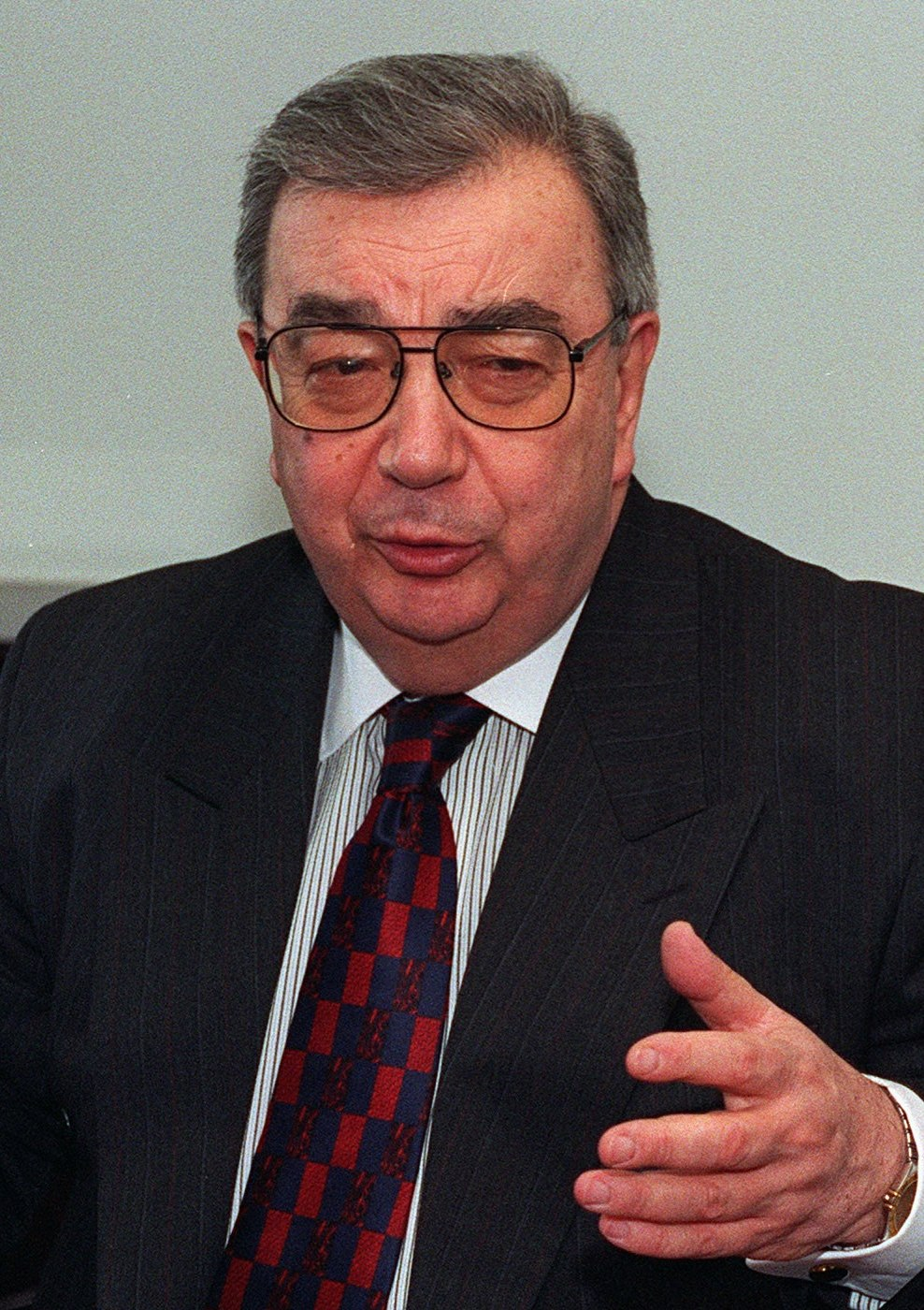
Yevgeny Primakov

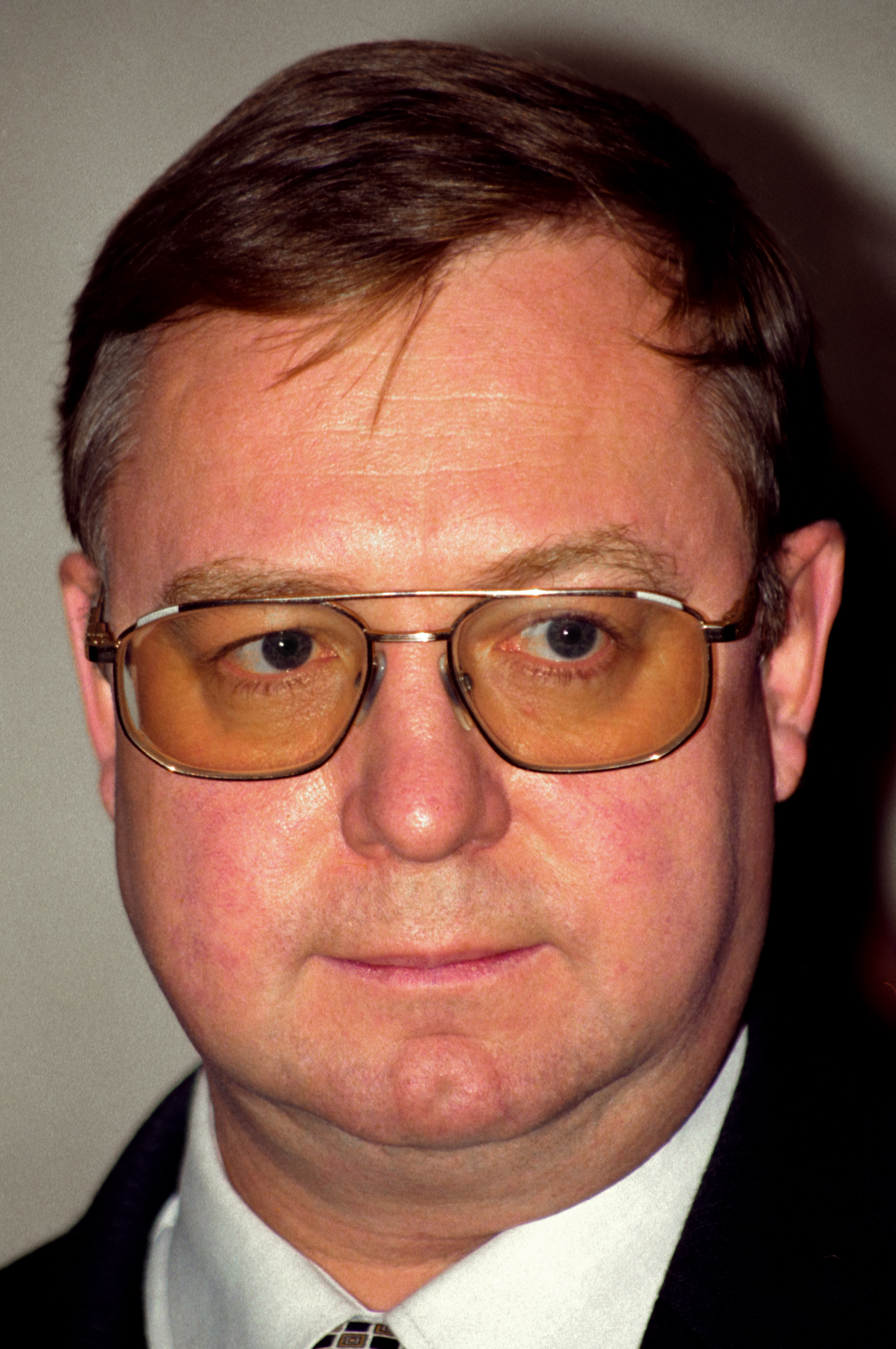
Sergei Stepashin

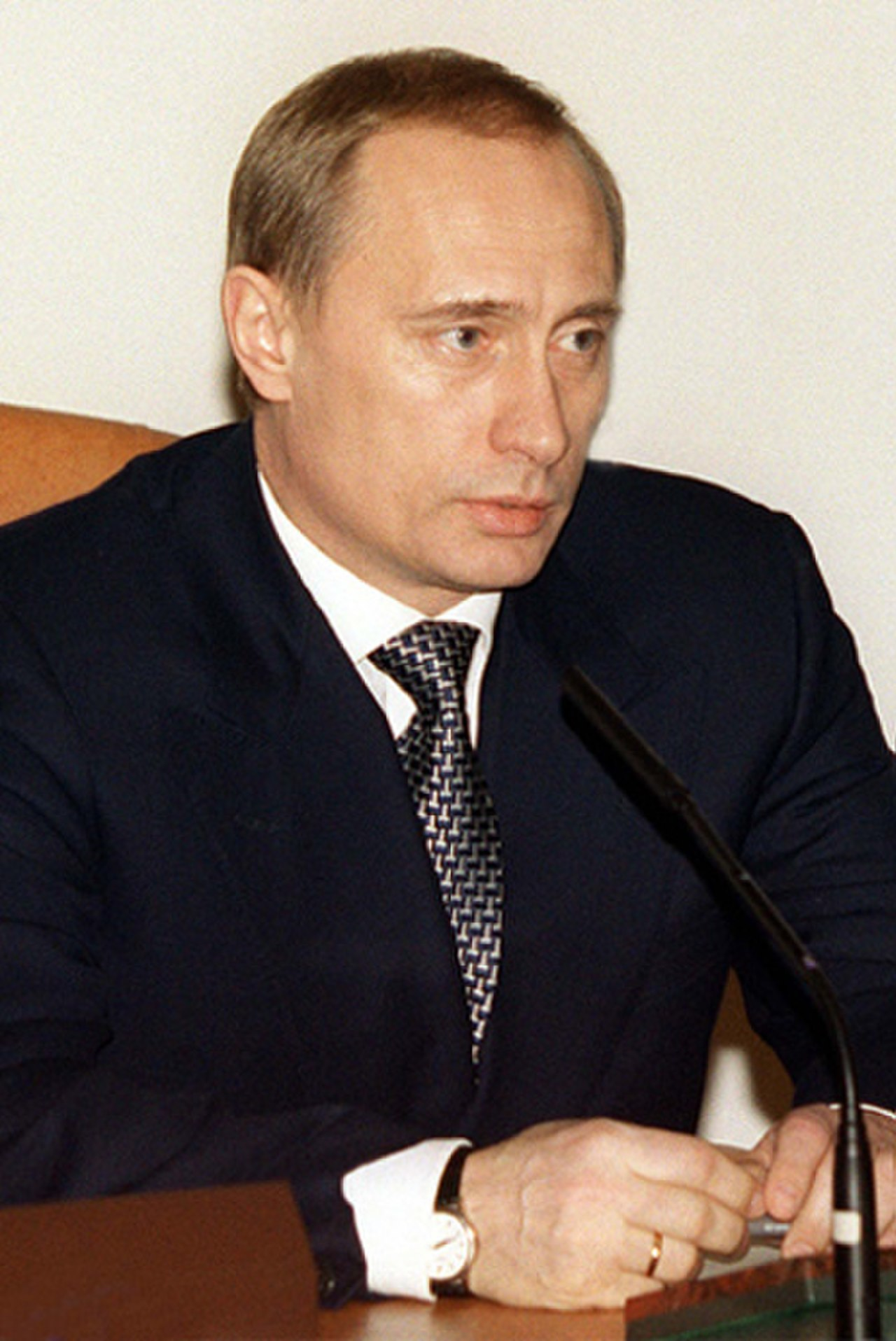
Vladimir Putin
- August 10, 1996: Viktor Chernomyrdin re-approved as Prime Minister of Russia with 314 votes in favor.
- April 24, 1998: Sergei Kiriyenko approved as Prime Minister of Russia with 251 votes in favor.
- September 11, 1998: Yevgeny Primakov approved as Prime Minister of Russia with 317 votes in favor.
- May 19, 1999: Sergei Stepashin approved as Prime Minister of Russia with 301 votes in favor.
- August 16, 1999: Vladimir Putin approved as Prime Minister of Russia with 233 votes in favor.

== Attempted impeachment of Boris Yeltsin ==
The procedure of impeachment of Boris Yeltsin was initiated in May 1999 on the basis of five charges: the collapse of the Soviet Union; 1993 constitutional crisis; the outbreak of War in Chechnya; weakening the country's defense.

Was formed a special Commission under the leadership of Vadim Filimonov.

On May 15, 1999, the vote to impeach Yeltsin was held, but none of the accusations received the necessary 300 votes.

Accusation(s)	Voice of factions									Result		
Accusation(s)	Communist Party	Liberal Democratic Party	Our Home – Russia	Yabloko	Agrarian Party	Narodovlastie	Regions of Russia	Independent	Democratic Choice of Russia	Result		
Accusation(s)	Collapse of the Soviet Union	127	1	1	5	35	43	20	9	Result	0	239/300
1993 constitutional crisis	128	2	0	24	35	43	22	9	0	263/300		
War in Chechnya	128	1	1	37	35	42	22	12	0	283/300		
Weakening the country's defense	127	2	2	3	35	43	20	9	0	241/300		
Genocide of the Russian people	127	2	2	0	35	43	19	9	0	238/300		

== Committees ==
28 Committees operated in the State Duma of the 2nd convocation.

Committee	Chair	Parliamentary group	Composition (as of 1996)
Legislation, Judicial and Legal Reform	Anatoly Lukyanov	Communist Party	14 members: ▌ CPRF (4); ▌ Independent (3); ▌ Yabloko (3); ▌ ADG (1); ▌ NDR (1); ▌ LDPR (1); ▌ Russian Regions (1)
Labour and Social Policy	Sergey Kalashnikov	Liberal Democratic Party	15 members: ▌ CPRF (7); ▌ LDPR (2); ▌ NDR (2); ▌ Yabloko (2); ▌ ADG (1); ▌ Narodovlastie (1)
Labour and Social Policy	Vladimir Lisichkin	Liberal Democratic Party	15 members: ▌ CPRF (7); ▌ LDPR (2); ▌ NDR (2); ▌ Yabloko (2); ▌ ADG (1); ▌ Narodovlastie (1)
Veterans Affairs	Valentin Varennikov	Communist Party	10 members: ▌ CPRF (6); ▌ ADG (1); ▌ LDPR (1); ▌ NDR (1); ▌ Yabloko (1)
Health Protection	Nikolai Gerasimenko	Russian Regions	12 members: ▌ NDR (3); ▌ CPRF (2); ▌ Russian Regions (2); ▌ ADG (1); ▌ LDPR (1); ▌ Narodovlastie (1); ▌ Yabloko (1); ▌ Independent (1)
Education and Science	Ivan Melnikov	Communist Party	12 members: ▌ CPRF (7); ▌ NDR (2); ▌ LDPR (1); ▌ Narodovlastie (1); ▌ Yabloko (1)
Women, Family and Youth Affairs	Alevtina Aparina	Communist Party	12 members: ▌ CPRF (6); ▌ NDR (2); ▌ ADG (1); ▌ LDPR (1); ▌ Yabloko (1); ▌ Independent (1)
Budget, Taxes, Banking and Finance	Mikhail Zadornov	Yabloko	46 members: ▌ Independent (10); ▌ Russian Regions (9); ▌ Narodovlastie (8); ▌ NDR (6); ▌ Yabloko (6); ▌ CPRF (3); ▌ ADG (2); ▌ LDPR (2)
Budget, Taxes, Banking and Finance	Alexander Zhukov	Russian Regions	46 members: ▌ Independent (10); ▌ Russian Regions (9); ▌ Narodovlastie (8); ▌ NDR (6); ▌ Yabloko (6); ▌ CPRF (3); ▌ ADG (2); ▌ LDPR (2)
Economic Policy	Yuri Maslyukov	Communist Party	14 members: ▌ CPRF (6); ▌ ADG (2); ▌ Narodovlastie (2); ▌ Yabloko (2); ▌ LDPR (1); ▌ NDR (1)
Economic Policy	Vladimir Tikhonov	Communist Party	14 members: ▌ CPRF (6); ▌ ADG (2); ▌ Narodovlastie (2); ▌ Yabloko (2); ▌ LDPR (1); ▌ NDR (1)
Property, Privatization and Economic Activities	Pavel Bunich	Our Home – Russia	21 members: ▌ CPRF (5); ▌ LDPR (5); ▌ NDR (4); ▌ Narodovlastie (2); ▌ Russian Regions (2); ▌ Yabloko (2); ▌ Independent (1)
Agrarian Issues	Alexey Chernyshyov	Agrarian Group	21 members: ▌ ADG (15); ▌ CPRF (3); ▌ LDPR (2); ▌ NDR (1)
Industry, Construction, Transport and Energy	Vladimir Gusev	Liberal Democratic Party	22 members: ▌ CPRF (5); ▌ Narodovlastie (5); ▌ LDPR (4); ▌ NDR (4); ▌ Russian Regions (2); ▌ ADG (1); ▌ Yabloko (1)
Natural Resources and the Environment	Aleksey Mikhailov	Yabloko	13 members: ▌ Russian Regions (3); ▌ ADG (2); ▌ CPRF (2); ▌ Yabloko (2); ▌ Independent (2); ▌ Narodovlastie (1); ▌ NDR (1)
Natural Resources and the Environment	Mikhail Glubokovsky	Yabloko	13 members: ▌ Russian Regions (3); ▌ ADG (2); ▌ CPRF (2); ▌ Yabloko (2); ▌ Independent (2); ▌ Narodovlastie (1); ▌ NDR (1)
Ecology	Tamara Zlotnikova	Yabloko	9 members: ▌ CPRF (2); ▌ Yabloko (2); ▌ LDPR (1); ▌ Narodovlastie (1); ▌ NDR (1); ▌ Russian Regions (1); ▌ Independent (1)
Defence	Lev Rokhlin	Our Home – Russia	18 members: ▌ CPRF (5); ▌ LDPR (3); ▌ NDR (3); ▌ Independent (3); ▌ ADG (1); ▌ Narodovlastie (1); ▌ Russian Regions (1); ▌ Yabloko (1)
Defence	Roman Popkovich	Our Home – Russia	18 members: ▌ CPRF (5); ▌ LDPR (3); ▌ NDR (3); ▌ Independent (3); ▌ ADG (1); ▌ Narodovlastie (1); ▌ Russian Regions (1); ▌ Yabloko (1)
Security	Viktor Ilyukhin	Communist Party	21 members: ▌ CPRF (4); ▌ Russian Regions (4); ▌ Independent (4); ▌ LDPR (2); ▌ Narodovlastie (2); ▌ NDR (2); ▌ Yabloko (2); ▌ ADG (1)
International Affairs	Vladimir Lukin	Yabloko	23 members: ▌ CPRF (6); ▌ LDPR (4); ▌ Russian Regions (3); ▌ Yabloko (3); ▌ Narodovlastie (2); ▌ NDR (2); ▌ Independent (2); ▌ ADG (1)
CIS Affairs and Relations with Compatriots	Georgy Tikhonov	Narodovlastie	14 members: ▌ CPRF (4); ▌ Narodovlastie (3); ▌ Yabloko (3); ▌ ADG (2); ▌ LDPR (1); ▌ NDR (1)
Ethnicities	Vladimir Zorin	Our Home – Russia	12 members: ▌ CPRF (4); ▌ NDR (4); ▌ Narodovlastie (2); ▌ LDPR (1); ▌ Russian Regions (1)
Federation Affairs and Regional Policy	Leonid Ivanchenko	Communist Party	15 members: ▌ CPRF (4); ▌ NDR (3); ▌ Yabloko (3); ▌ Narodovlastie (2); ▌ Russian Regions (2); ▌ Independent (1)
Local Government Issues	Andrey Polyakov	Our Home – Russia	11 members: ▌ CPRF (4); ▌ NDR (2); ▌ Yabloko (2); ▌ ADG (1); ▌ LDPR (1); ▌ Russian Regions (1)
Public Associations and Religious Organizations	Viktor Zorkaltsev	Communist Party	12 members: ▌ CPRF (6); ▌ ADG (1); ▌ LDPR (1); ▌ NDR (1); ▌ Russian Regions (1); ▌ Yabloko (1); ▌ Independent (1)
Rules and Organization of the State Duma	Dmitry Krasnikov	Agrarian Group	12 members: ▌ CPRF (5); ▌ ADG (2); ▌ NDR (2); ▌ LDPR (1); ▌ Russian Regions (1); ▌ Yabloko (1)
Rules and Organization of the State Duma	Viktor Popov	Agrarian Group	12 members: ▌ CPRF (5); ▌ ADG (2); ▌ NDR (2); ▌ LDPR (1); ▌ Russian Regions (1); ▌ Yabloko (1)
Information Policy and Communications	Oleg Finko	Liberal Democratic Party	13 members: ▌ CPRF (4); ▌ LDPR (4); ▌ Russian Regions (2); ▌ Yabloko (2); ▌ NDR (1)
Geopolitics	Aleksey Mitrofanov	Liberal Democratic Party	13 members: ▌ LDPR (8); ▌ CPRF (2); ▌ ADG (1); ▌ NDR (1); ▌ Independent (1)
Conversion and High Technologies	Georgy Kostin	Narodovlastie	12 members: ▌ CPRF (6); ▌ Narodovlastie (3); ▌ LDPR (1); ▌ NDR (1); ▌ Yabloko (1)
Tourism and Sports	Aleksandr Sokolov	Communist Party	12 members: ▌ CPRF (7); ▌ ADG (1); ▌ LDPR (1); ▌ Narodovlastie (1); ▌ NDR (1); ▌ Yabloko (1)
North Affairs	Vladimir Goman	Russian Regions	11 members: ▌ CPRF (3); ▌ NDR (3); ▌ LDPR (1); ▌ Narodovlastie (1); ▌ Russian Regions (1); ▌ Yabloko (1); ▌ Independent (1)
North Affairs	Boris Misnik	Yabloko	11 members: ▌ CPRF (3); ▌ NDR (3); ▌ LDPR (1); ▌ Narodovlastie (1); ▌ Russian Regions (1); ▌ Yabloko (1); ▌ Independent (1)
Culture	Stanislav Govorukhin	Narodovlastie	13 members: ▌ CPRF (6); ▌ NDR (3); ▌ Narodovlastie (2); ▌ LDPR (1); ▌ Yabloko (1)
