= Alexander Zhukov (politician, born 1956) =

Russian economist and politician

Alexander Zhukov MP
- Александр Жуков
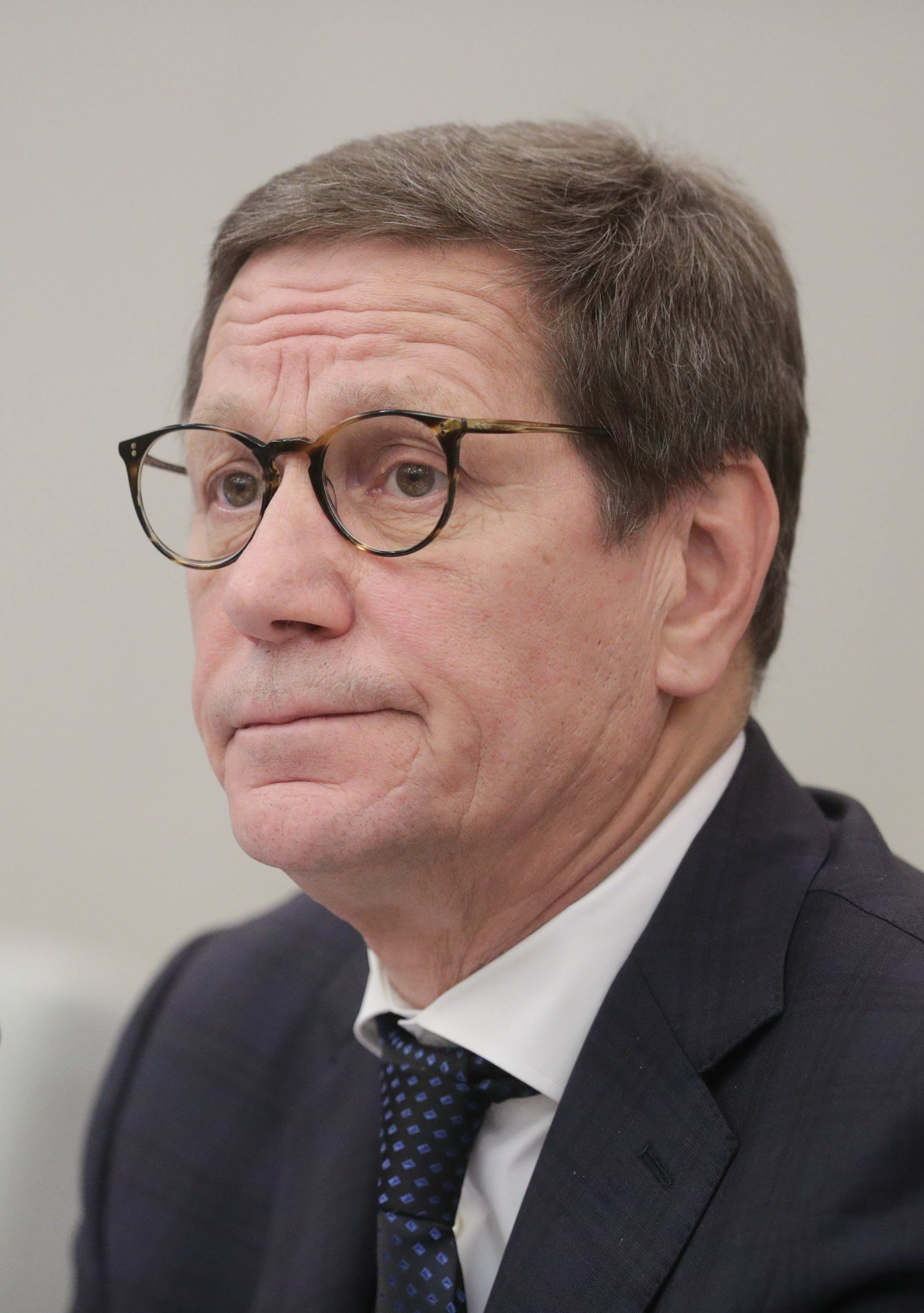
- Zhukov in 2021

First Vice Chairman of the State Duma
- Incumbent
- Assumed office 21 December 2011 Serving with Ivan Melnikov
- Chairman: Vyacheslav Volodin
- In office 29 December 2003 – 10 March 2004 Serving with Lyubov Sliska
- Chairman: Boris Gryzlov
- Succeeded by: Oleg Morozov

Member of the State Duma (Party List Seat)
- Incumbent
- Assumed office 21 December 2011

3rd President of the Russian Olympic Committee
- In office 20 May 2010 – 2 May 2018
- Preceded by: Leonid Tyagachyov
- Succeeded by: Stanislav Pozdnyakov

Deputy Prime Minister of Russia
- In office 9 March 2004 – 20 December 2011
- President: Vladimir Putin; Dmitry Medvedev
- Prime Minister: Mikhail Fradkov; Viktor Zubkov; Vladimir Putin

Member of the State Duma for Moscow
- In office 11 January 1994 – 10 March 2004
- Preceded by: constituency established
- Succeeded by: Sergey Shavrin
- Constituency: Preobrazhensky (No. 198) (Note: renumbered to 199 in 1995.)

Personal details
- Born: 1 June 1956 (age 70) Moscow, RSFSR, USSR
- Party: United Russia
- Spouse: Ekaterina Zhukova
- Children: Peter
- Parent: Dmitry Anatolievich Zhukov (father)
- Education: MSU Faculty of Economics; Harvard University
- Occupation: economist; mathematician
- Awards: Alt text
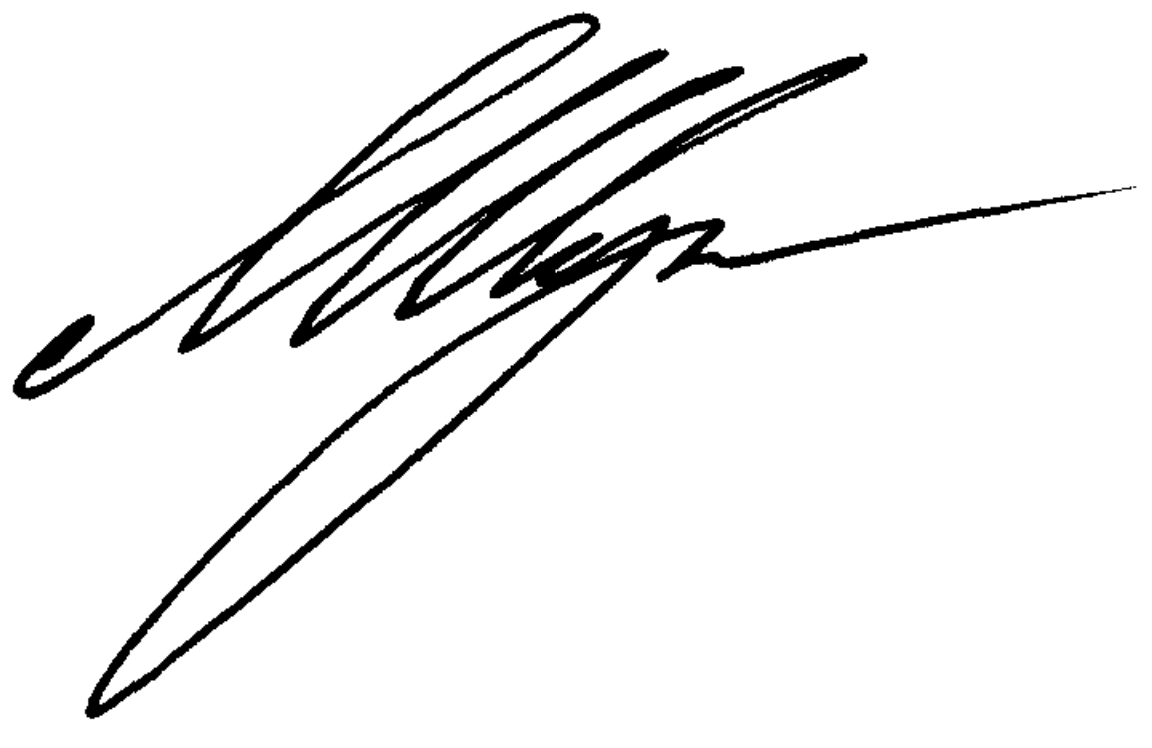
- Signature

Alexander Dmitrievich Zhukov (Russian: Александр Дмитриевич Жуков; born 1 June 1956) is a Russian economist and politician. Zhukov was a member of the State Duma from 1994 to 2004. He is the First Deputy Chairman of the State Duma of the Federal Assembly. Previously he was also the President of the Russian Olympic Committee.

== Early life ==
Alexander Zhukov was born in Moscow. His father was Dmitry Zhukov, a Soviet writer and translator of English.

He graduated from high school No. 444 in Moscow, then the Faculty of Economics of the Moscow State University (1978) with a degree in economics and mathematics. Then he studied at the Higher Economic Courses at the State Planning Committee of the USSR. Zhukov is an alumnus of Harvard Business School, and a specialist in the field of currency, tax and customs legislation.

== Career ==
=== Financier ===
In 1980–91 Zhukov was an employee of the Monetary and Economic Department of the USSR Ministry of Finance: economist, senior expert, chief expert, deputy head, and head of the branch for foreign economic relations.

In 1988, working very closely with Zhukov, Boris Fyodorov, and Kirill Ugolnikov (Russian: Кирилл Угольников), Deloitte & Touche began providing services to the Soviet Union and continued with Russia. From 1986 to 1989 he was a member of Baumansky District Council, Moscow. 1991–93 – Vice President of the Avtotraktoroexport JSC.

=== Member of parliament ===
In 1993 Zhukov elected to the First State Duma of Russia from the Preobrazhensky constituency of Moscow as a representative of the Dignity and Charity bloc, supported by the Choice of Russia. He was a member of the committee on budget, taxes, banks and finance, chairman of the Subcommittee on exchange regulation, foreign debt and precious metals. He was a member and deputy chairman of the parliamentary group "Liberal Democratic Union of December 12".

In February 1995 he was elected to the coordinating council of "Forward, Russia!" movement led by Boris Fyodorov, and chairman of the Moscow regional organization. In December Zhukov was reelected in Preobrazhensky constituency from "Forward, Russia!" and became chairman of the committee on budget. He was a member of the "Russian Regions" faction. In 1999 he was running from Fatherland – All Russia and in 2003 from United Russia.

=== In the cabinet ===
After the formation of the new cabinet in March 2004 Zhukov became deputy prime minister of Russia under Mikhail Fradkov. He was the chairman of the commission on legislative activity and the commission on issues of international humanitarian and technical assistance. His additional positions were coordinator of the Russian Tripartite Commission for the Regulation of Social and Labor Relations since May 2004, and chairman of the Board of Trustees of the Federal Housing Development Foundation since July 2008. Zhukov was one of the organizers of the monetization of benefits, a 2005 reform which caused widespread protests in Russia.

=== Return to the Duma ===
In December 2011, Zhukov was elected a deputy of the sixth State Duma of Russia on the list of United Russia. On 21 December, he was elected First Deputy Chairman of the State Duma and became a member of the committee on budget and taxes. He successfully reelected in September 2016.

From 2010 to 2018 Zhukov was the president of the Russian Olympic Committee and became an IOC member at the 125th IOC Session in Buenos Aires in September 2013. He was also president of the Russian Chess Federation from 2003 to 2009.

He was sanctioned by the UK government on 11 March 2022 in relation to the Russo-Ukrainian War.

== Honours ==
- Order of Merit for the Fatherland, 4th class (1 June 2006), 3rd class (4 May 2011) – for services to the state and many years of diligent work
- Order of Honour (24 April 2003) – for active legislative activity and many years of honest work
- Order of Alexander Nevsky (24 March 2014) – for a great contribution to the organization of the 22nd Olympic and 11th Paralympic Winter Games of 2014 in Sochi
- Diploma of the President of Russia (4 December 2009) – for active participation in preparing and conducting the All-Russia Forum "Russia – Sports Power"
- Order of Holy Prince Daniel of Moscow (Russian Orthodox Church, 2011)
