= Ivan Rybkin Bloc =

Ivan Rybkin Bloc Блок Ивана Рыбкина
- Leader: Ivan Rybkin
- Founded: 21 July 1995; 31 years ago
- Dissolved: 17 December 1995
- Split from: Agrarian Party of Russia
- Succeeded by: Russian Regions
- Headquarters: Moscow, Russia
- Youth wing: Russian Union of Youth
- Ideology: Agrarianism; Social democracy
- Political position: Centre-left
- Colours: Red
- Slogan: "Justice, Order, Peace" (Russian: "Справедливость, порядок, мир")
- Seats in the State Duma 2 convening (1995-2000): 3 / 450

The Ivan Rybkin Bloc (Russian: Блок Ивана Рыбкина, Blok Ivana Rybkina) was a political alliance in Russia. It was a centre-left bloc headed by the Duma Chairman Ivan Rybkin that represented the left-wing faction of the government and President Boris Yeltsin's inner circle. It participated in the 1995 Russian legislative election, where despite Rybkin's personal popularity, it fared poorly, winning only 1.11% of the popular vote and 3 constituency seats in the State Duma. The bloc disbanded shortly after the election, and its failure led to the term rybkinizatsiia being introduced to Russian political jargon, meaning "betrayal followed by oblivion".

== History ==
=== Foundation ===
The bloc was established by Ivan Rybkin on 21 July 1995. Rybkin, a moderate agrarian, was elected the Chairman of the State Duma in 1994, Rybkin entered Duma from the Agrarian Party of Russia, and was respected by political forces opposed to status quo. through a narrow majority of centrist and left-wing deputies. Rybkin was a former leader of the communist faction in the old Russian Congress/Supreme Soviet, and had a reputation as a pragmatic and straightforward figure that made him acceptable to many centrists and democrats; Rybnik consistently steered the Duma towards negotiations and compromise with the President, and succeeded in shifting the Duma's relationship with the President from confrontation to constructive counterweight.

As a result, President Yeltsin viewed Rybkin as a pragmatist opposition politician with whom he could cooperate. As the result, Yeltsin co-opted Rybkin into the Security Council of Russia, and made him a part of his plan to create a "loyal opposition". Yeltsin hoped that by deploying politicians such as Rybkin could have generated popular support, as Rybkin was favorable to Yeltsin, while at the same time being untarnished by the unpopularity of Yeltsin's administration and being seen as distant from Yeltsin's inner circle.

In May 1995, president Yeltsin recommended that two pro-government blocs be formed for the December 1995 parliamentary elections that would represent diverse ideological options - Rybkin's centre-left movement, and the centre-right Our Home Is Russia. This was an attempt to create a "two-party of power" system by Yeltsin; to aid the two blocs, Yeltsin wanted to increase the proportion of SMD deputies reltaive to party list ones as this would have been of electoral benefit to Our Home Is Russia and Ivan Rybkin Bloc, but he was forced to backtrack.

=== 1995 campaign ===
Already during the campaign, Ivan Rybkin Bloc was considered a failure and an embarrassment to its leader because it failed to attract the support of any Duma faction. In September 1995, Rybkin was expelled from his party, the Agrarian Party of Russia, for being too supportive of Yeltsin. During the campaign, the bloc focused greatly on Rybkin himself, with its commercials showing family photos and earlier life of Rybkin. The bloc became infamous for its commercial which featured two cows lamenting the decline of Russia and agreeing that "Ivan" was the one who could provide "fairness, order and peace". The commercial became known as "Rybkin's cows", and aroused strong reactions. Political scientist Stephen E. Hanson wrote that "the party became an object of public ridicule" because of the commercial.

The bloc spent lavish amounts of money on campaigning, amounting to 1.39 million US dollars, which made it the 4th party in the 1995 December elections in terms of money spent, slightly below Yabloko which spent 1.76 million. Political scientist Daniel Treisman argued that the party's campaigning was mostly counterproductive; the bloc was seen as squandering public funds for its political survival, and included controversial figures in its electoral list, such as Valery Neverov, a businessman accused of leading pyramid schemes. Many candidates of the Ivan Rybkin Bloc were not formally affilitated with the party and ran on its list independents.

As the election drew near, the bloc's odds seemed unfavourable. According to Georgy Tselms, while Rybkin was considerably popular as a politician, his bloc was seen as "just another repetition of old slogans and ideas". Rybkin's position was further weakened when labour unions left his bloc to contest the election either independently or with the Communist Party of Russian Federation. Especially damaging was the decision of General Boris Gromov to leave the Ivan Rybkin Bloc in September 1995. Gromov was popular for his criticisms of the government and Pavel Grachev during the Chechen campaign. His departure deprived the bloc of a large chunk of its potential voters.

=== Aftermath ===
In the 1995 election, the party only won 1.11% of the popular vote, which was insufficient to win any mandates on the party list, as it fell short of the 5% electoral threshold. However, the bloc won three individual districts, thus winning 3 seats through the SMDs. The bloc did not contest any further elections.

The party's result was considered an overwhelming failure, especially since President Yeltsin mobilized administrative resources in its favor. In the election, 43 blocs in total participated, but only 4 surpasses the 5% threshol, leaving 49.5% of party list votes "lost" (opposed to 12.9% in 1993). This led to the legitimacy of the election being challenged; Ivan Rybkin Bloc issued an appeal to the Constitutional Court of Russia regarding the issue, arguing that the "rights of millions of voters had been violated". Political commentators such as Otto Latsis and politicians such as Irina Khakamada supported bloc's appeal; Latsis argued that half of all party list votes being "lost" had "turned a doubtful system into a completely absurd one". However, the Ivan Rybkin Bloc's submission was rejected by the Constitutional Court.

The bloc then "disappeared virtually without trace", and did not form its own faction in the Duma. The bloc's fate led to the emergence of the term rybkinizatsiia in the Russian language, in the meaning of "betrayal followed by oblivion", especially in political context. After the election, many reform-oriented and government-deputies wanted to re-elect Rybkin as the Duma chairman, but this was unsuccessful because of Yabloko's opposition. However, Yeltsin appointed Rybkin as the Secretary of the Secretary Council in October 1996.

Derek S. Hutchenson attributes the bloc's failure to the absence of a stable middle class which would have been its base, the general weakness of the centre-left in 1990s Russia, and the marginalisation of many prominent members of the democratic and centrist wing. Luke March summarized the reasons for the bloc's failure:

First, it was simply too public (the name "Ivan Rybkin bloc" laid bare its artificiality). Second, it was premature. In 1995, the electorate was still too polarized and the left brand "too closely associated with antisystemic opposition [that is, the communists] for the voters to back 'loyal' reds." Third, it was poorly executed: the El'tsin-era elite was too ambivalent about and incompetent at party building to create one party of power, let alone two, and key elite figures joined neither.

The three candidates that won constituency mandates in the Duma were: Ivan Rybkin from the Anna constituency, Vladimir Bryntsalov of the Orekhovo-Zuyevo constituency, and Artur Chilingarov of the Nenets constituency.

== Organization ==
The leader of the bloc was Ivan Rybkin, and its member organizations were:

- Russia's Labor Unions In Elections;
- My Motherland;
- Russian Fund of Afghan War Invalids;
- Dignity and Charity;
- Consent;
- Russian Youth Union;
- Russia's Regions; and others.

== Ideology ==
The Ivan Rybnik Bloc was widely described as centre-left. The bloc was mostly composed of small parties with a social democratic orientation, along with official labour unions. However, the unions ultimately left the bloc to run as independents or to run with the Communist Party of Russian Federation. The bloc also represented agrarian groups, as this was the political background of Rybkin himself, who stated that defending the interests of domestic producers was the core of the party's program.

It was a part of effort by President Yeltsin to create two voting blocks, centre-right and centre-left respectively, that would represent presidential power and be "convenient" partners in power games. Thus, the Ivan Rybkin Bloc offered critical support to the government while at the same time emphasizing that the less advantaged must be protected from the consequences of capitalist restoration. According to political scientist Graeme Gill, the bloc was mean to "constitute the focus of leftist political activity" while stabilizing and supporting the government; Gill compared Ivan Rybkin Bloc to the role of A Just Russia under the rule of United Russia.

The bloc's electoral programme presented a list of promises, including slowing down privatization, retaining the state ownership profitable and strategic industries, high levels of duty on the export of raw materials, and protectionist policies that would protect domestic producers. It made ambitious promises to guarantee Russians payment of salaries without delay, "sensible prices", free healthcare, and guaranteed pensions and employment. Rybkin opposed austerity, stating that cutting back on spending without an increase in goods productions would have devastating effects on the economy.
