= 1st State Duma =

1993–1995 Russian legislative convocation

(Russia) State Duma of the Russian Federation of the 1st convocation
| ← | 12th Supreme Soviet | 2nd State Duma | → |
- Seat composition of the 1st State Duma

Overview
- Meeting place: Comecon Building, New Arbat Avenue, 36; State Duma Building, Okhotny Ryad Street, 1
- Term: 11 January 1994 – 17 January 1996
- Election: 1993 parliamentary election
- Government: 23 committees
- Website: State Duma
- Members: 444 / 450
- Chairman: Ivan Rybkin (from Agrarian Party)

Sessions
- 1st: 11 January 1994 – 22 July 1994
- 2nd: 5 October 1994 – 23 December 1994
- 3rd: 11 January 1995 – 21 July 1995
- 4th: 4 October 1995 – 22 December 1995

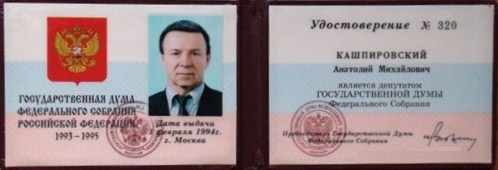
Certification of the State Duma deputy Anatoly Kashpirovsky

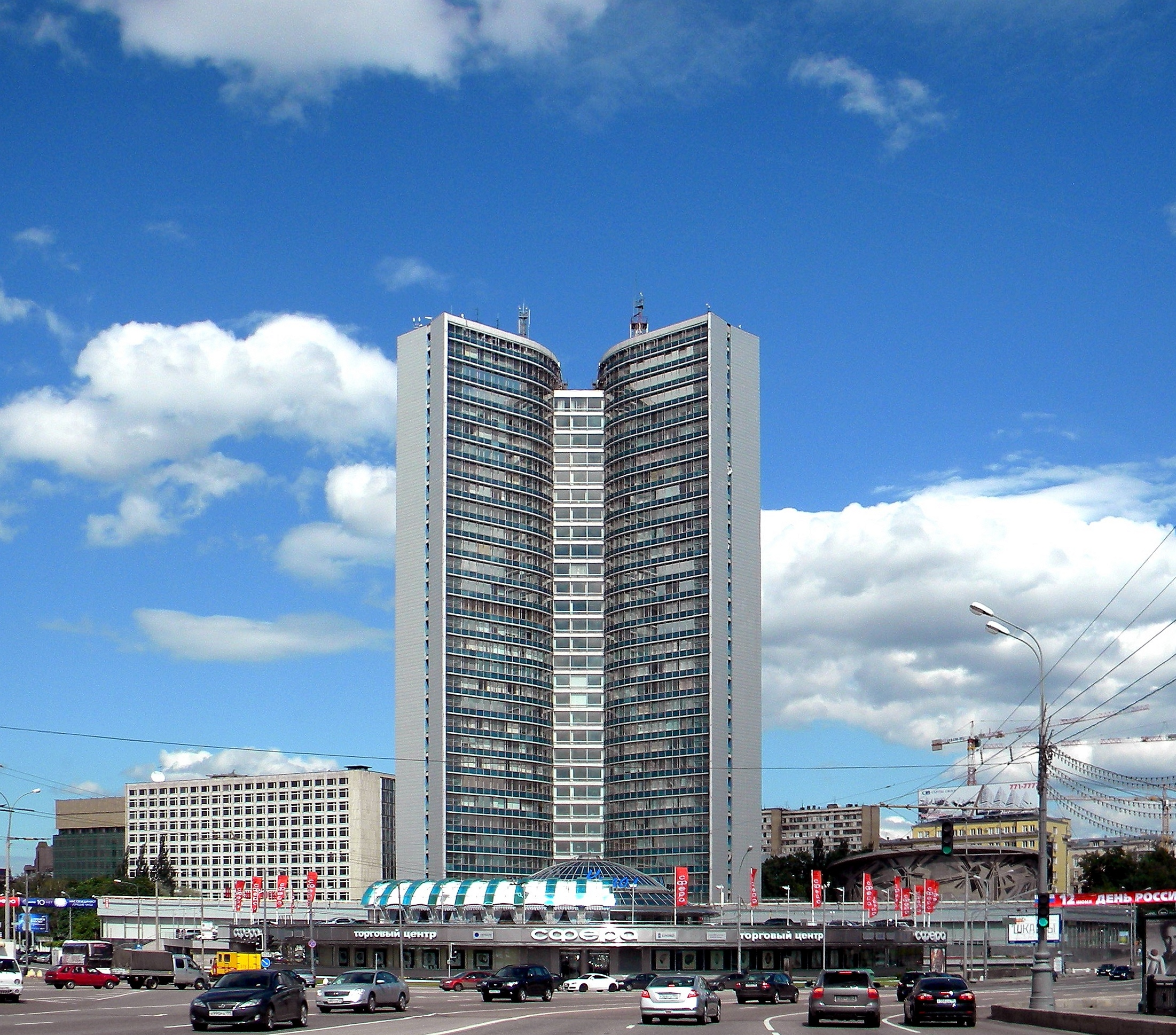
Comecon Building – place where the first meeting was held.

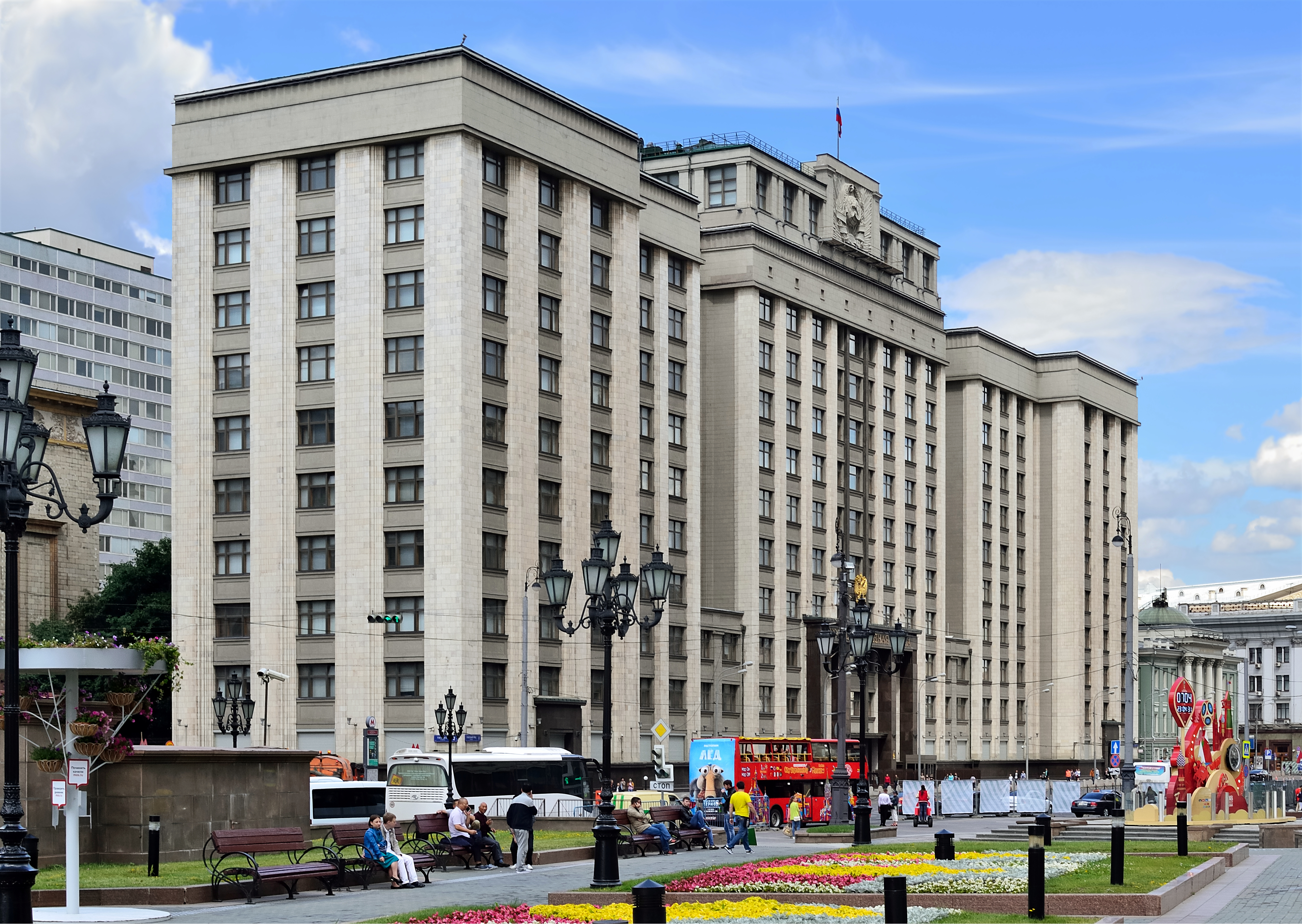
Modern building of the State Duma.

The State Duma of the Federal Assembly of the Russian Federation of the 1st convocation (Russian: Государственная Дума Федерального Собрания Российской Федерации I созыва) is a former convocation of the State Duma, Lower House of the Federal Assembly. The first few months, the State Duma was located in the Comecon building on New Arbat Avenue, then moved to the State Duma building on Okhotny Ryad.

== Leadership ==
On January 14, 1994, the parliament elected Agrarian Ivan Rybkin as the Chairman of the State Duma. Before his election, the session was moderated by the oldest deputy, 68-year-old Liberal Democrat Georgy Lukava.

| Office | MP | Period | Parliamentary affiliation |
|---|---|---|---|
| Chairman | Ivan Rybkin | 14 January 1994 – 17 January 1996 | Agrarian Party |
| First Deputy Chairman | Mikhail Mityukov | 17 January 1994 – 17 January 1996 | Choice of Russia |
| Deputy Chairmen | Valentin Kovalyov | 17 January 1994 – 18 January 1995 | Communist Party |
| Deputy Chairmen | Gennady Seleznyov | 25 January 1995 – 17 January 1996 | Communist Party |
| Deputy Chairmen | Alexander Vengerovsky | 17 January 1994 – 17 January 1996 | Liberal Democratic Party |
| Deputy Chairmen | Alevtina Fedulova | 17 January 1994 – 17 January 1996 | Women of Russia |
| Deputy Chairmen | Artur Chilingarov | 10 June 1994 – 17 January 1996 | New Regional Policy |

=== Chairman election ===
The first round was held on 13 January 1994 by rating voting using an open ballot. The runoff was conducted by secret ballot on the next day, before which Yury Vlasov endorsed Ivan Rybkin.

| Candidate | Faction | First ballot | | Second ballot | |
| Candidate | Faction | Votes | % | Votes | % |
|---|---|---|---|---|---|
| ✓ Ivan Rybkin | Agrarian Party | 233 | 52.5% | 223 | 50.2% |
| Yury Vlasov | Independent | 200 | 45.0% | 23 | 5.2% |
| Vladimir Lukin | Yabloko | 176 | 39.6% | | |
| Vladimir Medvedev | New Regional Policy | 145 | 32.7% | | |
| Sergey Kovalyov | Choice of Russia | 138 | 31.1% | | |
| Alexander Braginsky | Union of December 12 | 86 | 19.4% | | |

== Factions and groups ==
Parliamentary groups created by eight parties that passed the 5% electoral threshold were known as factions (фракции) and were given official status regardless of their vote share in the chamber, while groups created by independent deputies and party switchers were required to have at least 35 members to keep their registration.

| Faction/group | Seats (at dissolution) | Leader |
|---|---|---|
| Liberal Democratic Party of Russia | 55 | Vladimir Zhirinovsky |
| Agrarian Party of Russia | 51 | Mikhail Lapshin |
| Choice of Russia | 47 | Yegor Gaidar |
| Communist Party of the Russian Federation | 46 | Gennady Zyuganov |
| New Regional Policy | 36 | Vladimir Medvedev |
| Russia | 36 | Igor Shichanin |
| Stability | 36 | Aleksey Leushkin |
| Yabloko | 27 | Grigory Yavlinsky |
| Women of Russia | 20 | Yekaterina Lakhova |
| Party of Russian Unity and Accord | 12 | Sergey Shakhray |
| Liberal Democratic Union of 12 December (unregistered) | 11 | Boris Fyodorov |
| Russian Way (unregistered) | 11 | Sergey Baburin |
| Democratic Party of Russia | 10 | Stanislav Govorukhin |
| Derzhava (unregistered) | 4 | Viktor Kobelev |
| Independents | 38 | |
| Vacant | 10 | |

== Committees ==
23 committees operated in the State Duma of the 1st convocation.

| Committee | Chair | Faction |
|---|---|---|
| Law, Judicial and Legal Reform | Vladimir Isakov | Agrarian Party |
| Labour and Social Welfare | Sergey Kalashnikov | Liberal Democratic Party |
| Budget, Taxes, Banking and Finance | Mikhail Zadornov | Yabloko |
| Economic Policy | Sergey Glazyev | Democratic Party |
| Property, Privatization and Economic Activity | Sergey Burkov | New Regional Policy |
| Information Policy and Communications | Mikhail Poltoranin | Choice of Russia |
| Industry, Construction, Transport and Energy | Vladimir Gusev | Liberal Democratic Party |
| Education, Culture and Science | Lyubov Rozhkova | New Regional Policy |
| Health | Bela Denisenko | Choice of Russia |
| Women, Family and Youth | Galina Klimantova | Women of Russia |
| Agrarian Issues | Aleksandr Nazarchuk | Agrarian Party |
| Agrarian Issues | Alexey Chernyshyov | Agrarian Party |
| Defence | Sergey Yushenkov | Choice of Russia |
| Security | Viktor Ilyukhin | Communist Party |
| International Affairs | Vladimir Lukin | Yabloko |
| CIS Affairs and Relations with Compatriots | Konstantin Zatulin | Democratic Party |
| Organization of the State Duma | Vladimir Bauer | New Regional Policy |
| Geopolitics | Viktor Ustinov | Stability |
| Federation Affairs and Regional Policy | Sergey Shapovalov | Party of Russian Unity and Accord |
| Local Government | Anatoly Sliva | Party of Russian Unity and Accord |
| Ecology | Mikhail Lemeshev | Liberal Democratic Party |
| Natural Resources and Land Use | Nikolay Astafyev | Liberal Democratic Party |
| Public Associations and Religious Organizations | Viktor Zorkaltsev | Communist Party |
| Nationalities | Bair Zhamsuyev | Stability |

== Major legislation ==
- Federal Constitutional Law "On the Constitutional Court" (21 July 1994)
- Civil Code of Russia (21 October 1994)
- Arbitration Procedure Code of Russia (5 April 1995)
- Federal Constitutional Law "On the referendum" (7 July 1995)
- Water Code of Russia (16 November 1995)
- Family Code of Russia (8 December 1995)
