= Democratic Choice of Russia =

Democratic Choice of Russia Демократический выбор России
- Abbreviation: DVR (English); ДВР (Russian)
- Leader: Yegor Gaidar
- Founded: 17 October 1993 (Choice of Russia bloc) 12 June 1994 (Democratic Choice of Russia party)
- Dissolved: 19 May 2001
- Succeeded by: Union of Right Forces
- Headquarters: 23th Building, Profsoyuznaya Street, Moscow
- Newspaper: "Democratic Choice", magazine "Open politics"
- Ideology: Conservative liberalism Liberal conservatism
- Political position: Centre-right
- Colours: White; Blue; Red
- Slogan: "Liberty, Property, Legality" (Russian: "Свобода, Собственность, Законность")
- Seats in the 1st State Duma: 64 / 450
- Seats in the 2nd State Duma: 9 / 450

Website
- dvr.ru

The Democratic Choice of Russia (DCR), (Note: Russian: Демократический выбор России (ДВР), romanized: Demokratičeskij vybor Rossii (DVR), IPA: [dʲɪməkrɐˈtʲitɕɪskʲɪj ˈvɨbər rɐˈsʲiɪ (ˌdɛˌvɛˈɛr)]) known before 1994 as the "Choice of Russia" Bloc (CR), (Note: Russian: Блок «Выбор России» (ВР), romanized: Blok «Vybor Rossii» (VR), IPA: [bɫoɡ ˈvɨbər rɐˈsʲiɪ (ˌvɛˈɛr)]) was a Russian centre-right conservative-liberal political party. It dissolved itself in 2001 and most members merged into the Union of Right Forces.

== Background and establishment ==
First logo (1993–1994)

The party was founded by and included many leading reformist politicians in the Boris Yeltsin administration, including Deputy Prime Minister Yegor Gaidar, Foreign Minister Andrey Kozyrev, Press Minister Vladimir Shumeyko, Finance Minister Boris Fyodorov, privatization chief Anatoly Chubais, and current and former presidential advisors Mikhail Poltoranin, Gennady Burbulis, and Pyotr Filippov. At the launch of Russia's Choice (or Choice of Russia) in October 1993, Gaidar said that "the bloc we are forming is the party of the new order, the only one which can be created in Russia today: a democratic and market order." The party's convention was held with 617 delegates from 88 federal subjects of Russia where it intended to field candidates. A schism occurred in the same month when Deputy Prime Minister Sergey Shakhray formed the Party of Russian Unity and Accord, which favored a larger role for the state in economic reforms than what was supported by Russia's Choice.

=== 1994 State Duma ===
On 7 November 1993, Russia's Choice became one of the 21 parties registered for the elections of the State Duma of the Federal Assembly by the Central Electoral Commission of Russia, to replace the previous Congress of People's Deputies. It was in third place by the number of signatures for the registration, following the Agrarian Party of Russia and the Party of Russian Unity and Accord. It was just ahead of the Communist Party of the Russian Federation. Deputy Prime Minister Alexander Shokhin criticized the party's radical reform policies later that month, saying that it was turning entire regions of Russia into social catastrophe zones and causing support for communists and other far leftists. Members of Russia's Choice visited cities across Russia during the campaign leading up to the election. On 2 December, a media-monitoring group claimed that the party was getting disproportionate coverage on Russian television. Separately, it was also accused of using US foreign aid money intended for the economic reform to fund itself.

During the campaign, the party's candidates portrayed the Communists as seeking to impose a totalitarian regime. Vladimir Zhirinovsky's right-wing Liberal Democratic Party of Russia (LDPR) was called a "threat to the nation." At the elections to the State Duma held on 12 December 1993, Choice of Russia received 15.51% of the vote, and consequently, 40 seats in the State Duma. In many parts of the country, the LDPR finished in first or second place, rivaling Choice of Russia.

On 20 January 1994, having lost influence over making economic decisions and opposed to the increase of budget expenditure, the leader of the Choice of Russia, Yegor Gaidar, resigned from the government headed by Viktor Chernomyrdin. At that point the Choice of Russia lost its status as a pro-government faction, yet at the same time it continued to support president Boris Yeltsin and Chernomyrdin's government by providing constructive criticism of their policies.

== Reform ==
On 12 and 13 June 1994, the founding meeting of the party Democratic Choice of Russia was held. At the meeting, the party's programme was adopted and its governing bodies were set up. Yegor Gaidar was elected as party chairman.

=== 1996 State Duma ===
In 1995, the party contested the election in a coalition of (minor) like-minded groups, forming the Democratic Choice of Russia – United Democrats.

== Dissolution ==
Later, in 2001, it merged into the Union of Rightist Forces.

== Values ==
The party had valued ideas of both liberalism and conservatism. This included human rights, self-determination, a market economy, private capital investment, fair competition and the restriction of government regulations in the economy.

== Election results ==
=== Presidential election ===
Election	Candidate	First round		Second round		Result
Election	Candidate	Votes	%	Votes	%	Result
1996	Endorsed Boris Yeltsin	26,665,495	35.32%	40,402,349	53.82%	Elected ✓
2000	Endorsed Vladimir Putin	39,740,434	52.94%			Elected ✓

=== State Duma elections ===
Election	Party leader	Performance					Rank	Government
Election	Party leader	Votes	%	± pp	Seats	+/–	Rank	Government
1993	Yegor Gaidar	8,339,345	15.51%	New	64 / 450	New	▲2nd	Coalition
1995	Yegor Gaidar	2,674,084	3.86% (DVR-OD)	▼11.65	9 / 450	▼55	▼4th	Opposition (1995–1997)
1995	Yegor Gaidar	2,674,084	3.86% (DVR-OD)	▼11.65	9 / 450	▼55	▼4th	Coalition (1997–1998)
1995	Yegor Gaidar	2,674,084	3.86% (DVR-OD)	▼11.65	9 / 450	▼55	▼4th	Opposition (1998–1999)
1995	Yegor Gaidar	2,674,084	3.86% (DVR-OD)	▼11.65	9 / 450	▼55	▼4th	Coalition (1999)
1995	Yegor Gaidar	2,674,084	3.86% (DVR-OD)	▼11.65	9 / 450	▼55	▼4th	Opposition (1999)
1999	Yegor Gaidar	5,677,247	8.52% (SPS)	▲4.66	29 / 450	▲20	4th	Coalition

== See also ==
- Democratic Russia
- Liberalism in Russia
- Popular Patriotic Party
