= Olga Yepifanova =

Russian politician

- Ольга Епифанова
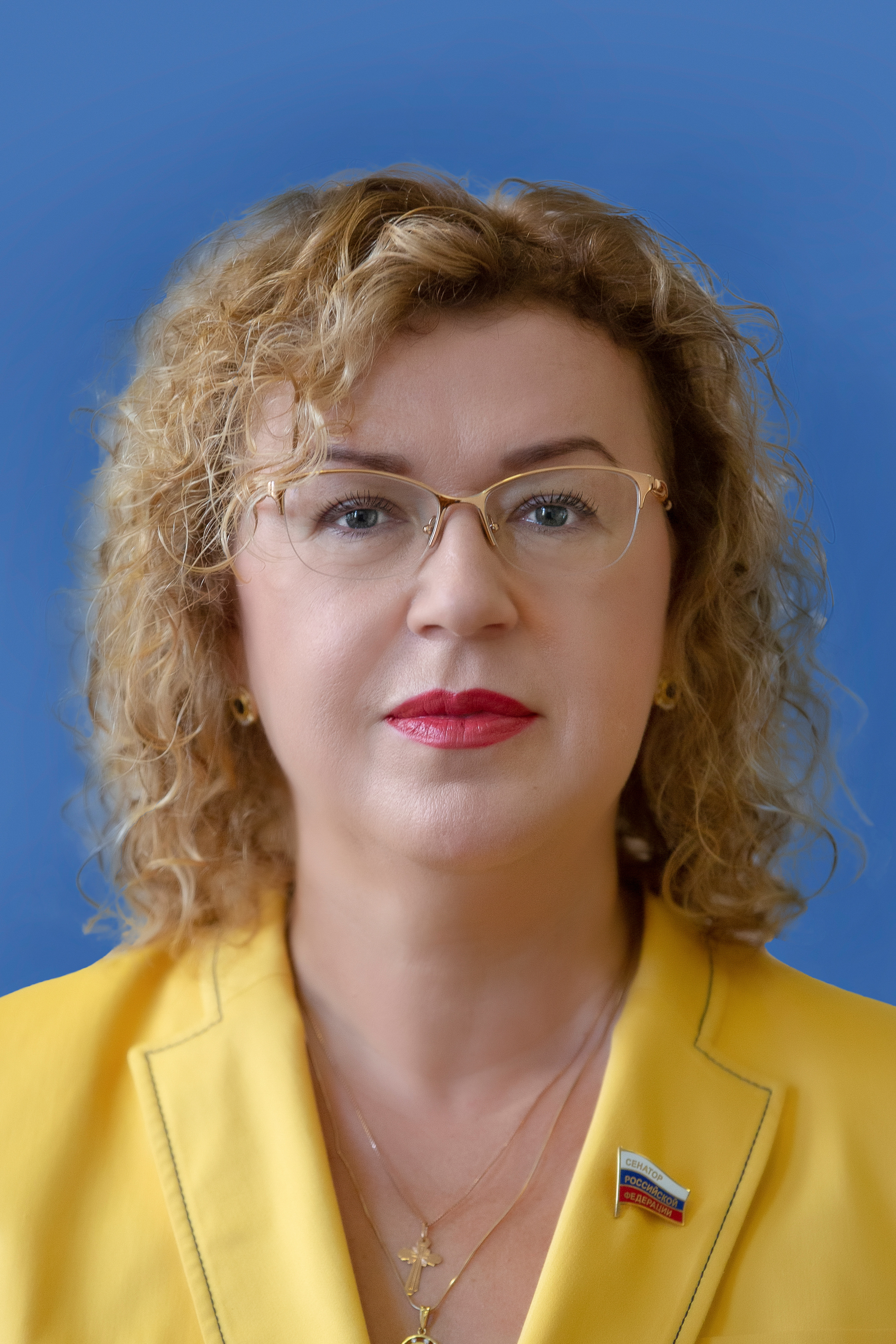
- Yepifanova in 2020

Russian Federation Senator from the Komi Republic
- Incumbent
- Assumed office 23 September 2020
- Preceded by: Dmitry Shatokhin

Deputy Chairman of the State Duma
- In office 5 October 2016 – 23 September 2020
- Chairman: Vyacheslav Volodin

Deputy of the State Duma
- In office 21 December 2011 – October 2020

Personal details
- Born: 19 August 1966 (age 60) Novgorod, Russian SFSR, Soviet Union
- Party: A Just Russia (2008–present)
- Education: Simferopol College of Soviet Trade

Military service
- Branch/service: Soviet Armed Forces; Russian Armed Forces
- Years of service: 1989–1994

Olga Nikolayevna Yepifanova (Russian: О́льга Никола́евна Епифа́нова; born 19 August 1966) is a Russian politician who served as Deputy Chairman of the State Duma in 2016–2020. She has served as a deputy of the State Duma since 2011.

== Early life ==
Olga Nikolaevna Yepifanova was born on 19 August 1966 in Novgorod, Russian SFSR, Soviet Union.
