= List of deputy chairmen of the State Duma =

Below is a list of office-holders:

== Russian Empire ==
Name	Period	Political party
I Convocation (1906)
Pavel Dolgorukov	1906	Constitutional Democratic Party
Nikolay Gredeskul	1906	Constitutional Democratic Party
II Convocation (1907)
Nikolay Podznansky	1907	Independent Left
Mikhail Berezin	1907	Trudoviks
III Convocation (1907–1912)
Vladimir Volkonsky	1907–1912	Union of the Russian People
Alexander Meyendorf	1907–1909	Union of October 17
Sergey Shidlovsky	1909–1910	Union of October 17
Mikhail Kapustin	1910–1912	Union of October 17
IV Convocation (1912–1917)
Dmitry Urusov	1912–1917	Progressive Bloc
Vladimir Volkonsky	1912–1913	Union of the Russian People
Nikolay Lvov	1913	Progressive Bloc
Aleksandr Konovalov	1913–1914	Progressive Bloc
Sergey Varun-Secret	1913–1916	Union of October 17
Alexander Protopopov	1914–1916	Union of October 17
Nikolai Nekrasov	1916–1917	Constitutional Democratic Party
Vladimir Bobrinsky	1916–1917	Party of Moderately Right

== Russian Federation ==
  - I Convocation
  - II Convocation
  - III Convocation
  - IV Convocation
  - V Convocation
  - VI Convocation
  - VII Convocation
  - VIII Convocation
  - IX Convocation
- The First Deputy Chairman is highlighted in **bold**.

Name	Period	Political party
I Convocation (1994–1996)
**Mikhail Mityukov**	17 January 1994 – 16 January 1996	Choice of Russia
Alexander Vengerovsky	17 January 1994 – 16 January 1996	Liberal Democratic Party
Valentin Kovalyov	17 January 1994 – 18 January 1995	Communist Party
Gennady Seleznyov	25 January 1995 – 16 January 1996	Communist Party
Alevtina Fedulova	17 January 1994 – 16 January 1996	Women of Russia
Artur Chilingarov	10 June 1994 – 16 January 1996	New Regional Policy
II Convocation (1996–2000)
**Alexander Shokhin**	18 January 1996 – 5 September 1997	Our Home – Russia
**Vladimir Ryzhkov**	10 September 1997 – 3 February 1999	Our Home – Russia
**Boris Kuznetsov**	17 February 1999 – 18 January 2000	Our Home – Russia
Sergey Baburin	18 January 1996 – 18 January 2000	Russian All-People's Union
Svetlana Goryacheva	18 January 1996 – 18 January 2000	Communist Party
Mikhail Gutseriyev	18 January 1996 – 18 January 2000	Liberal Democratic Party
Artur Chilingarov	18 January 1996 – 18 January 2000	Regions of Russia
Mikhail Yuryev	20 March 1996 – 18 January 2000	Yabloko
III Convocation (2000–2003)
**Lyubov Sliska**	19 January 2000 – 5 September 2003	Unity
Vladimir Averchenko	19 January 2000 – 29 December 2003	People's Deputy Group
Vladimir Zhirinovsky	19 January 2000 – 29 December 2003	Liberal Democratic Party
Pyotr Romanov	19 January 2000 – 29 December 2003	Communist Party
Gennady Semigin	19 January 2000 – 29 December 2003	Communist Party
Artur Chilingarov	19 January 2000 – 29 December 2003	Regions of Russia
Georgy Boos	11 February 2000 – 29 December 2003	Fatherland – All Russia
Boris Nemtsov	16 February – 31 May 2000	Union of Right Forces
Irina Hakamada	31 May 2000 – 29 December 2003	Union of Right Forces
Vladimir Lukin	16 February 2000 – 29 December 2003	Yabloko
IV Convocation (2003–2007)
**Lyubov Sliska**	29 December 2003 – 24 December 2007	United Russia
**Alexander Zhukov**	29 December 2003 – 24 March 2004	United Russia
**Oleg Morozov**	21 September 2005 – 24 December 2007	United Russia
Georgy Boos	29 December 2003 – 21 September 2005	United Russia
Yury Volkov	21 September 2005 – 24 December 2007	United Russia
Vyacheslav Borodin	29 December 2003 – 24 December 2007	United Russia
Vladimir Zhirinovsky	29 December 2003 – 24 December 2007	Liberal Democratic Party
Valentin Kuptsov	29 December 2003 – 24 December 2007	Communist Party
Oleg Morozov	29 December 2003 – 21 September 2005	United Russia
Vladimir Pekhtin	29 December 2003 – 24 December 2007	United Russia
Dmitry Rogozin	29 December 2003 – 5 March 2004	Rodina
Sergey Baburin	28 June 2005 – 24 December 2007	Rodina
Vladimir Katrenko	26 March 2004 – 24 December 2007	United Russia
Artur Chilingarov	29 December 2003 – 24 December 2007	United Russia
V Convocation (2007–2011)
**Oleg Morozov**	24 December 2007 – 4 December 2011	United Russia
Alexander Babakov	24 December 2007 – 21 December 2011	A Just Russia
Yury Volkov	24 December 2007 – 21 December 2011	United Russia
Vyacheslav Borodin	24 December 2007 – 1 November 2010	United Russia
Nadezhda Gerasimova	24 December 2007 – 21 December 2011	United Russia
Vladimir Zhirinovsky	24 December 2007 – 21 December 2011	Liberal Democratic Party
Svetlana Zhurova	24 December 2007 – 21 December 2011	United Russia
Ivan Melnikov	24 December 2007 – 21 December 2011	Communist Party
Lyubov Sliska	24 December 2007 – 21 December 2011	United Russia
Valery Yazev	24 December 2007 – 21 December 2011	United Russia
VI Convocation (2011–2016)
**Alexander Zhukov**	21 December 2011 – 5 October 2016	United Russia
**Ivan Melnikov**	21 December 2011 – 5 October 2016	Communist Party
Andrey Vorobyov	21 December 2011 – 8 November 2012	United Russia
Vladimir Vasilyev	13 November 2012 – 5 October 2016	United Russia
Igor Lebedev	21 December 2011 – 5 October 2016	Liberal Democratic Party
Nikolai Levichev	21 December 2011 – 25 March 2016	A Just Russia
Alexander Romanovich	25 March 2016 – 5 October 2016	A Just Russia
Oleg Morozov	21 December 2011 – 25 May 2012	United Russia
Sergey Zheleznyak	8 June 2012 – 5 October 2016	United Russia
Sergey Neverov	21 December 2011 – 5 October 2016	United Russia
Lyudmila Shvetsova	21 December 2011 – 29 October 2014	United Russia
Andrey Isayev	11 November 2014 – 5 October 2016	United Russia
VII Convocation (2016–2021)
**Alexander Zhukov**	5 October 2016 – 12 October 2021	United Russia
**Ivan Melnikov**	5 October 2016 – 12 October 2021	Communist Party
Vladimir Vasilyev	5 October 2016 – 3 October 2017	United Russia
Igor Lebedev	5 October 2016 – 12 October 2021	Liberal Democratic Party
Olga Yepifanova	5 October 2016 – 29 September 2020	A Just Russia
Irina Yarovaya	5 October 2016 – 12 October 2021	United Russia
Pyotr Tolstoy	5 October 2016 – 12 October 2021	United Russia
Sergey Neverov	5 October 2016 – 13 February 2020	United Russia
Olga Timofeeva	11 October 2017 – 12 October 2021	United Russia
Alexey Gordeyev	13 February 2020 – 12 October 2021	United Russia
Igor Ananskikh	30 September 2020 – 12 October 2021	A Just Russia
VIII Convocation (2021–2026)
**Alexander Zhukov**	12 October 2021 – 30 September 2026	United Russia
**Ivan Melnikov**	12 October 2021 – 30 September 2026	Communist Party
Irina Yarovaya	12 October 2021 – 30 September 2026	United Russia
Pyotr Tolstoy	12 October 2021 – 30 September 2026	United Russia
Sergey Neverov	12 October 2021 – 23 July 2024	United Russia
Anna Kuznetsova	12 October 2021 – 30 September 2026	United Russia
Alexey Gordeyev	12 October 2021 – 30 September 2026	United Russia
Sholban Kara-ool	12 October 2021 – 30 September 2026	United Russia
Viktoria Abramchenko	17 September 2024 – 30 September 2026	United Russia
Boris Chernyshov	12 October 2021 – 30 September 2026	Liberal Democratic Party
Alexander Babakov	12 October 2021 – 30 September 2026	A Just Russia – For Truth
Vladislav Davankov	12 October 2021 – 30 September 2026	New People
IX Convocation (Since 2026)
**Irina Yarovaya**	30 September 2026–present day	United Russia
**Ivan Melnikov**	30 September 2026–present day	Communist Party
Alexander Zhukov	30 September 2026–present day	United Russia
Anna Kuznetsova	30 September 2026–present day	United Russia
Alexey Gordeyev	30 September 2026–present day	United Russia
Viktoria Abramchenko	30 September 2026–present day	United Russia
Vladimir Vasilyev	30 September 2026–present day	United Russia
Vitaly Savelyev	30 September 2026–present day	United Russia
Maria Voropayeva	30 September 2026–present day	Liberal Democratic Party
Vladislav Davankov	30 September 2026–present day	New People
Alexander Babakov	30 September 2026–present day	A Just Russia

== Sources ==
- Europa World Year Book 1995, 1997, 1998, 2000, 2001, 2004, 2008, 2012
