= Mikhail Fradkov's First Cabinet =

First cabinet of Mikhail Fradkov
- 50th Cabinet of Russia

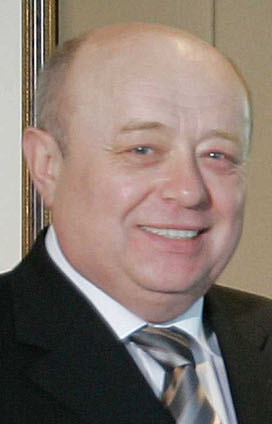
- Date formed: 5 March 2004
- Date dissolved: 7 May 2004

People and organisations
- Head of state: Vladimir Putin
- Head of government: Mikhail Fradkov
- Deputy head of government: Alexander Zhukov
- No. of ministers: 16
- Member party: United Russia
- Status in legislature: Majority
- Opposition party: Communist Party
- Opposition leader: Gennady Zyuganov

History
- Predecessor: Kasyanov
- Successor: Fradkov II

Mikhail Fradkov's First Cabinet (March - May 2004) was a cabinet of the government of the Russian Federation during the presidential election of 2004, preceded by the cabinet of Mikhail Kasyanov, who had been dismissed by President Vladimir Putin on February 24, 2004, and followed by Mikhail Fradkov's Second Cabinet immediately after Vladimir Putin's second inauguration.

It was led by Prime Minister Mikhail Fradkov, proposed by President Vladimir Putin for the approval by the State Duma on March 1, 2004. On March 5 Fradkov was approved by the State Duma and appointed Prime Minister by the President. Other 16 ministers of the cabinet were appointed by presidential decrees on March 9. Seven of the ministers occupied the same positions in Mikhail Kasyanov's Government: Yury Chaika, Alexey Gordeyev, German Gref, Sergei Ivanov, Viktor Khristenko, Alexey Kudrin, and Sergei Shoigu. The cabinet underwent no reshuffles and resigned on May 7. It was a temporary cabinet, as Russian legislation stipulates that a new government has to be formed in the beginning of a new presidential term, so the ministers remained acting and were reappointed with minor changes as Mikhail Fradkov's Second Cabinet few days later.

== Members ==
Portfolio	Minister	Took office	Left office	Party
Prime Minister	Mikhail Fradkov	5 March 2004	12 May 2004	Independent
Deputy Prime Minister	Alexander Zhukov	9 March 2004	12 May 2004	United Russia
Minister of Agriculture	Alexey Gordeyev	9 March 2004	12 May 2004	United Russia
Minister of Culture and Mass Media	Aleksandr Sokolov	9 March 2004	12 May 2004	Independent
Minister of Defence	Sergei Ivanov	9 March 2004	12 May 2004	Independent
Minister of Economic Development and Trade	Herman Gref	9 March 2004	12 May 2004	Independent
Minister of Education and Science	Andrei Fursenko	9 March 2004	12 May 2004	Independent
Minister of Emergency Situations	Sergei Shoigu	9 March 2004	12 May 2004	United Russia
Minister of Finance	Alexey Kudrin	9 March 2004	12 May 2004	Independent
Minister of Foreign Affairs	Sergey Lavrov	9 March 2004	12 May 2004	United Russia
Minister of Industry and Energy	Viktor Khristenko	9 March 2004	12 May 2004	Independent
Minister of Health and Social Development	Mikhail Zurabov	9 March 2004	12 May 2004	Independent
Minister of Internal Affairs	Rashid Nurgaliyev	9 March 2004	12 May 2004	Independent
Minister of Justice	Yury Chaika	9 March 2004	12 May 2004	Independent
Minister of Natural Resources	Yury Trutnev	9 March 2004	12 May 2004	United Russia
Minister of Transport and Communications	Igor Levitin	9 March 2004	12 May 2004	Independent
Minister, Chief of Staff of the Government	Dmitry Kozak	9 March 2004	12 May 2004	Independent
