= Russian Union of Industrialists and Entrepreneurs =

Russian lobbying group

- Российский союз промышленников и предпринимателей
- Formation: 1990
- Founder: Arkady Volsky
- Purpose: Representing Russian business interests
- Headquarters: Kotelnicheskaya Embankment 17, Moscow, Russia
- Key people: Alexander Shokhin (President) Igor Yurgens (Vice-President)
- Website: http://eng.rspp.ru/

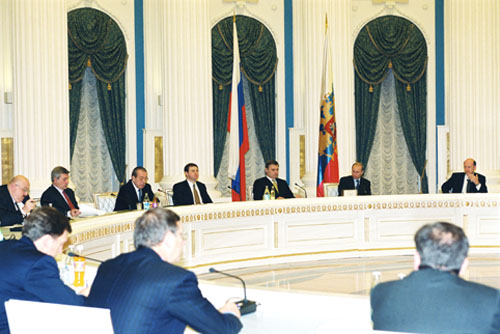
Putin meeting with the union in 2001.

The Russian Union of Industrialists and Entrepreneurs (RSPP), a lobby group based in Moscow, promotes the interests of business in Russia. It has over 1,000 members, including both private and state-owned companies, factories, and foreign and Russian plants. The RSPP represents the successor in the Russian Federation of the previous USSR scientific and industrial union founded in the summer of 1990. The lobby is nicknamed as oligarch trade union.

Arkady Volsky founded the Union in 1991 and headed it until 2005. He was succeeded by Aleksandr Shokhin, vice-premier of Russia from 1991 to 1994, and subsequently a Duma deputy for eight years.

The current president is Alexander Shokhin. The current vice-president, Igor Yurgens, a graduate of Moscow State University, has served as an adviser to UNESCO and to the Trade Unions Council, and chaired the General Confederation of Trade Unions in 1996. Yurgens is sometimes interviewed by Western media on issues concerning Russian industry.

At a meeting of the lobby in July 2009, telecommunications executives portrayed the most popular VoIP programs like Skype and ICQ as encroaching foreign entities that the government must control.
