= Mikhail Kapustin =

Russian hygienist and politician

- Михаил Капустин
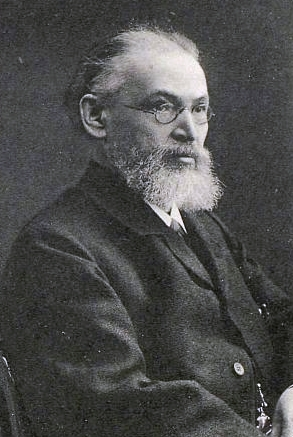

Deputy Chairman of the State Duma
- In office 1910–1912
- Monarch: Nicholas II
- Preceded by: Sergey Shidlovsky
- Succeeded by: Dmitry Urusov

Personal details
- Born: Mikhail Yakovlevich Kapustsin; 1847 Tomsk, Tomsk Governorate, Russian Empire
- Died: 1920 (aged 72–73) St. Petersburg, Russian SFSR
- Party: Union of October 17
- Occupation: Politician, Hygienist

Mikhail Yakovlevich Kapustin (Russian: Михаи́л Я́ковлевич Капу́стин; (1847 – 1920) was a Russian hygienist and politician. He served as the Deputy Chairman of the State Duma from 1910 to 1912.

== Early life ==
He received his early education in Tomsk high school. He then studied at the former Medical Surgical Academy in St. Petersburg. He graduated in December 1870 from the academy with the title of doctor.

== Career ==
He worked as a professor of Hygiene at the Kazan University. As a native of West Siberia, Kapustin engaged in medical activities, first as a country doctor, and after 1874, a military doctor. During the Russo-Turkish War (1877–1878), Kapustin was a doctor at a military and a temporary hospital in the Caucasus. After the war, he left military service and returned to general medicine, prefacing his lessons at the hygiene laboratory of Professor A.P. Dobroslavina: "Determination of carbon dioxide in the air by means of alcohol sodium hydroxide solution and titration of water."

For this work, in December 1879, he completed the degree of Doctor of Medicine. He worked as health officer in the public boards of several provinces. He developed and implemented various hygienic measures. Kapustin published articles and brochures on various issues of health and community medicine.

In 1884, Kapustin was promoted to serve as a private-docent of hygiene in the Military Medical Academy and the following year became a professor in the same department at the University of Warsaw.

Kapustin held the Position of Head of the Department of Hygiene in Kazan beginning in1887.

His book, Osnovnye voprosy zemskoĭ medit︠s︡iny, is available in the National Library of Medicine Digital Collections.
