= Ivan Rybkin =

Russian politician (born 1946)

- Иван Рыбкин
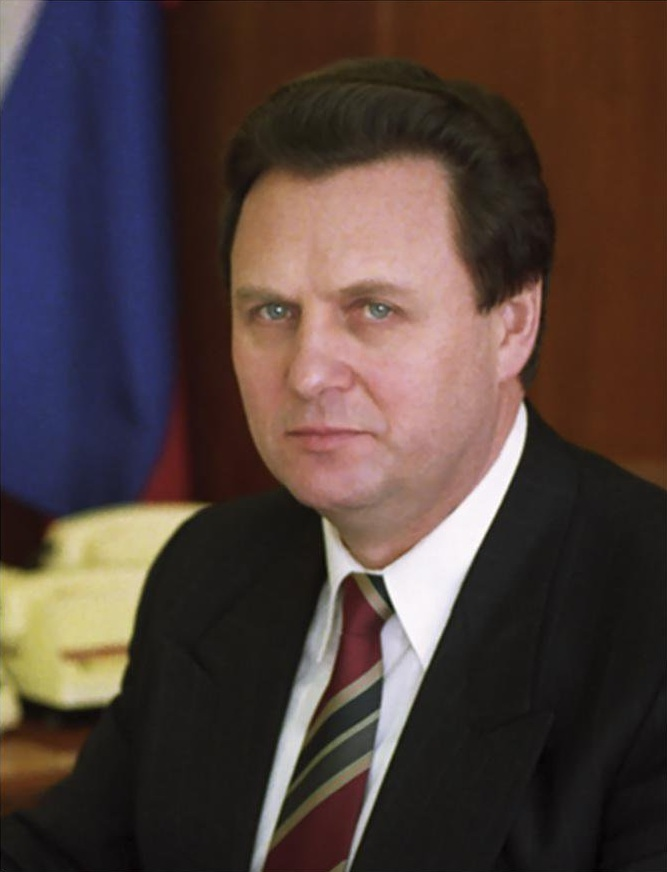
- Rybkin in 1999

6th Chairman of the State Duma
- In office 14 January 1994 – 17 January 1996
- President: Boris Yeltsin
- Preceded by: Ruslan Khasbulatov (as Chairman of the Supreme Soviet); Mikhail Rodzianko (as Chairman of the State Duma of Russian Empire)
- Succeeded by: Gennadiy Seleznyov

5th Secretary of the Security Council
- In office 19 October 1996 – 2 March 1998
- Preceded by: Alexander Lebed
- Succeeded by: Andrei Kokoshin

Personal details
- Born: 20 October 1946 (age 79) Semigorka, Voronezh Oblast, Russian SFSR, Soviet Union

Ivan Petrovich Rybkin (Russian: Иван Петрович Рыбкин; born 20 October 1946) is a Russian politician. He was Chairman of Russia's State Duma in 1994–96 and Secretary of the Security Council in 1996–1998. He has the federal state civilian service rank of 1st class Active State Councillor of the Russian Federation.

He ran for the Russian presidency in 2004, before dropping out after allegedly being kidnapped and drugged by Russian Federal Security Service (FSB) officers.

== Early life ==
He was born in village of Semigorka, Voronesh Oblast. In 1968, Rybkin graduated from Volgograd Agricultural Institute, and in 1991 from the Soviet Academy of Social Sciences.

== Political career ==
After a career on lower ranks of the Communist Party, Rybkin was elected as peoples' deputy to the congress of the Russian Soviet Federated Socialist Republic in 1990. In 1993, Rybkin became a member of the Agrarian Party of Russia. That very year in December, he was elected deputy of the State Duma.

=== Speaker of Russian State Duma ===
In 1994, Rybkin was elected speaker of the State Duma. In January 1995, he became a member of the Security Council of the Russian Federation. In July of that year, Rybkin became a leader of the Ivan Rybkin Bloc.

Ivan Rybkin Bloc got 1.39% of the vote in the 1995 Russian legislative election, falling short of a 5% electoral threshold. Its campaign video clip featured two cows who discussed fairness in a philosophical manner.

In March 1998, Rybkin was appointed Deputy Prime Minister for Commonwealth of Independent States affairs.

=== Presidential campaign and alleged kidnapping ===
In 2004, Rybkin was nominated by Berezovsky's Liberal Party for the Russian presidential elections. During the campaign, on 2 February 2004, he accused incumbent President Vladimir Putin of organizing terrorist acts in Russia in 1999 and of being involved in shady business activities with Yury Kovalchuk, Mikhail Kovalchuk, Gennady Timchenko, KiNEx and the Russia Bank, which allegedly swallowed up a vast share of the nation's financial flows.

Rybkin's candidacy aligned itself strongly with Berezovsky's politics. While it was believed that Rybkin would, even optimistically, be unable to receive more than 2% of the vote, it was also believed that he might receive a sizable enough amount of funding from Berezovsky that he could orchestrate a significant amount of anti-Putin campaigning in advance of the election.

Many Russians had reported themselves to be too unfamiliar with Rybkin to have an opinion on him.

In February 2004, Rybkin disappeared for four days under mysterious circumstances. A day before his disappearance he accused the Putin administration of complicity in the 1999 bomb attacks in Moscow that led to a war in the Russian breakaway republic of Chechnya. Five days later, Rybkin appeared in Kyiv. According to Rybkin's first explanations, on February 5 he decided to “take a break from the fuss” that was raised around him and went to Kyiv. Rybkin did not specify what kind of “fuss” this was. He said that he turned off his mobile phones so that his rest would not be disturbed. “I have the right to two or three days of privacy! - said Rybkin. “I often visit Kyiv, my friends and I walk the streets, especially since the weather was good there this weekend.” Later, he stated that he had been kidnapped and drugged by Russian FSB agents who lured him to Ukraine promising to arrange meeting with the former Chechen leader Aslan Maskhadov. Upon arrival he was offered refreshments in the apartment, at which point he became "very drowsy." After being unconscious, he woke up on 10 February. Upon waking, he was shown a videotape in which he was performing "revolting acts" conducted by "horrible perverts". He was told that the tape would be made public if he continued with his presidential campaign. According to Alexander Litvinenko, the FSB agents apparently treated Rybkin with their standard truth drug.

Rybkin said he feared for his safety if he returned to Russia, and whilst he initially continued the campaign from abroad, on 5 March 2004, he withdrew from the race, saying he did not want to be part of "this farce," as he called the elections.

Political offices
Preceded by Ruslan Khasbulatov as Chairman of the Supreme Soviet; Mikhail Rodzianko as Chairman of the State Duma of Russian Empire	Chairman of the State Duma; 14 January 1994 – 17 January 1996	Succeeded by Gennadiy Seleznyov
Preceded by Alexander Lebed	Secretary of the Security Council of Russia; 19 October 1996 – 2 March 1998	Succeeded by Andrei Kokoshin
