= Agrarian Party of Russia =

Political party in Russia

Agrarian Party of Russia Аграрная партия России
- Logo until 2013 (left) and since 2013 (right)
- Abbreviation: APR
- Chairperson: Olga Bashmachnikova (last)
- Founders: Mikhail Lapshin; Vasily Starodubtsev; Alexander Davydov
- Founded: 26 February 1993 (first) 2 May 2012 (second)
- Dissolved: 12 September 2008 (first) 21 October 2019 (second)
- Merged into: United Russia (2008–2012)
- Headquarters: 20th Building, Bolshoy Golovin Lane, Moscow, Russia
- Newspaper: Russian land
- Youth wing: Russian Agrarian Youth Union
- Membership (2008): 164,089
- Ideology: Agrarianism; Centrism; Before 2009: Agrarian socialism Soviet collectivism
- Political position: Centre to centre-left Before 2009: Left-wing
- National affiliation: People's Patriotic Union of Russia (formerly); Fatherland – All Russia (1999–2001); All-Russia People's Front (2012–2019)
- Colours: Green; Red; Yellow
- Slogan: "Strong Agrarians – Powerful Nation" (Russian: "Сильные аграрии – Мощная держава"); Before 2009: "Peace and bread to every home!" (Russian: "Мир и хлеб – каждому дому!")
- Anthem: Russian land, We will not forget You
- Seats in the 1st State Duma: 37 / 450
- Seats in the 2nd State Duma: 20 / 450
- Seats in the 3rd State Duma: 11 / 450

Party flag

Website
- agroparty.ru (archived)

The Agrarian Party of Russia (APR; Russian: Аграрная партия России, romanized: Agrarnaya partiya Rossii) was an agrarian political party in Russia. Founded in February 1993, it was among the earliest parties in the Russian Federation.

== History ==
=== 1993–2009 ===
The Agrarian Party of Russia was founded on 26 February 1993, by the head of the Altai Republic, Mikhail Lapshin and Vasily Starodubtsev, governor of the Tula region and former member of the Soviet Union's State Committee on the State of Emergency. During their leadership (1993–2004), the party made an alliance with the Communist Party of the Russian Federation (CPRF) and the Fatherland – All Russia bloc. Until 2009, the party supported agrarian socialism and collectivism.

Founder Mikhail Lapshin led the party until 2004; its most recent leader was Vladimir Plotnikov. In the legislative elections in December 1993, the Agrarian Party obtained 37 seats in the Duma and won 8% of the popular vote. Between 1994 and 1996, one of its party members, Ivan Rybkin, was the speaker of the Russian Parliament. In the legislative elections in December 1995, the APR did not make it over the 5% threshold, obtaining only 3.78% of the votes. In the legislative elections on 7 December 2003, the party won 3.6% of the popular vote and three out of 450 seats in the parliament.

Agrarian Party member Nikolay Kharitonov ran as a presidential candidate from the Communist Party of the Russian Federation in the 2004 Russian presidential election and won 13.7% of the votes, coming out second to Vladimir Putin.

In the 1990s, party deputies were usually allies of the Communist Party in the State Duma and advocated for greater government support for the agricultural sector.

The party won 2.30% of the votes in the 2007 elections, did not break the 7% barrier, and thus, had no seats in the Duma.

The Agrarian Party supported the candidacy of Dmitry Medvedev in the 2008 Russian presidential election. It later merged with United Russia—the party that currently holds the most seats in the Duma.

=== 2012–2019 ===
The year 2012 marked an especially notable period for the party as it was officially restored, and the registered leader Olga Bashmachnikova was elected Executive Director of the Agricultural Association on May 18. This led the party to take a new direction, moving away from the ideologies of agrarian socialism and collectivism towards centrism. The party has abandoned the Alliance with the Communist Party of the Russian Federation (CPRF), which was in the union since its foundation. The APR is currently united with the People's Front for Russia and the Russian Ecological Party "The Greens".

According to the results of the elections of 2012, 2013 and 2014, the party failed to win in regional and city parliaments.

On 21 October 2019, the Supreme Court of Russia, following a lawsuit by the Ministry of Justice, liquidated the party for insufficient participation in the elections for 7 years.

== Electoral results ==
=== Presidential elections ===
Election	Candidate	First round		Second round		Result
Election	Candidate	Votes	%	Votes	%	Result
1996	Endorsed Gennady Zyuganov	24,211,686	32.03%	30,102,288	40.31%	Lost ✗
2000	Endorsed Vladimir Putin	39,740,434	52.94%			Elected ✓
2004	Endorsed Vladimir Putin	49,565,238	71.31%			Elected ✓
2008	Endorsed Dmitry Medvedev	52,530,712	70.28%			Elected ✓
2012	Party was part of United Russia and did not participate in the elections					
2018	Supported Vladimir Putin	56,430,712	76.69%			Elected ✓

=== Legislative elections ===
Election	Party leader	Performance					Rank	Government
Election	Party leader	Votes	%	± pp	Seats	+/–	Rank	Government
1993	Mikhail Lapshin	4,292,518	7.99%	New	37 / 450	New	4th	Coalition
1995	Mikhail Lapshin	2,613,127	3.78%	▼4.21	20 / 450	▼17	▼5th	Opposition (1995–1998)
1995	Mikhail Lapshin	2,613,127	3.78%	▼4.21	20 / 450	▼17	▼5th	Coalition (1998–1999)
1995	Mikhail Lapshin	2,613,127	3.78%	▼4.21	20 / 450	▼17	▼5th	Opposition (1999)
1999	Mikhail Lapshin	8,886,753	13.33% (OVR)	▲9.55	11 / 450	▼9	▼7th	Coalition
2003	Mikhail Lapshin	2,205,704	3.63%	▼9.70	2 / 450	▼9	7th	Opposition
2007	Vladimir Plotnikov	1,600,234	2.30%	▼1.33	0 / 450	▼2	▲5th	Extra-parliamentary
2011	Party was part of United Russia and did not participate in the elections							
2016	Olga Bashmachnikova	Did not contest						Extra-parliamentary

== Leadership ==
Order	Portrait	Name	Term of Office	
1		Mikhail Lapshin (1934–2006)	26 February 1993	28 April 2004
2		Vladimir Plotnikov (born 1961)	28 April 2004	20 January 2009
Party dissolved
3		Olga Bashmachnikova (born 1971)	18 May 2012	21 October 2019

== See also ==
- Peasant Party of Ukraine
- Agrarian Party of Ukraine
- Belarusian Agrarian Party
