= Alexander Shokhin =

Russian politician

- Александр Шохин
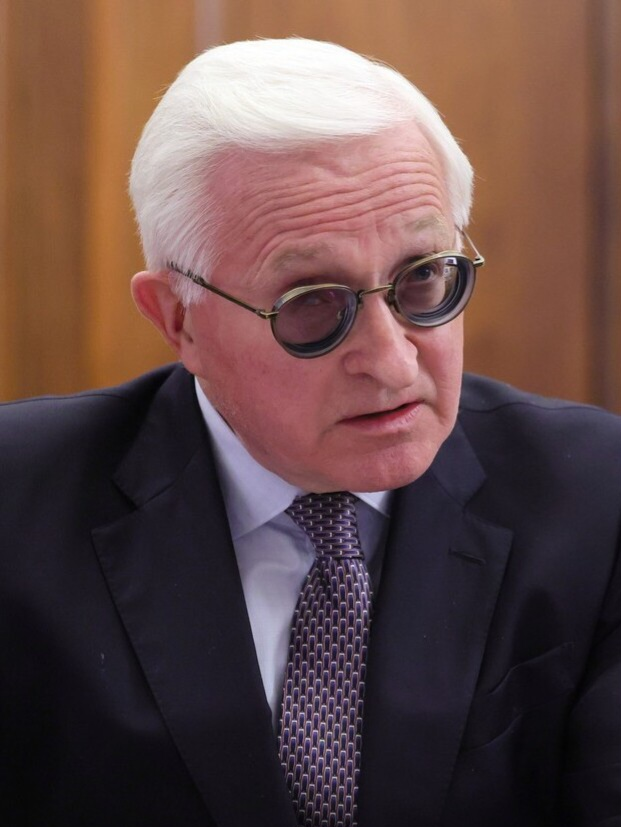
- Shokhin in 2026

First Deputy Chairman of the State Duma
- In office 18 January 1996 – 5 September 1997
- Chairman: Gennady Seleznyov
- Preceded by: Mikhail Mityukov
- Succeeded by: Vladimir Ryzhkov

Minister of Economy
- In office 20 January 1994 – 6 November 1994
- Prime Minister: Viktor Chernomyrdin
- Preceded by: Yegor Gaidar
- Succeeded by: Yevgeny Yasin

Minister of Labour
- In office 26 August 1991 – 14 June 1992
- Prime Minister: Ivan Silayev; Boris Yeltsin
- Preceded by: Rafik Batkayev
- Succeeded by: Gennady Melikyan

Personal details
- Born: 25 December 1951 (age 74) Savinskoye, Plesetsky District, Arkhangelsk Oblast, RSFSR, Soviet Union
- Party: United Russia (since 2004)
- Other political affiliations: NDR (1995–2004); CPSU (1974–1991)
- Education: Moscow State University
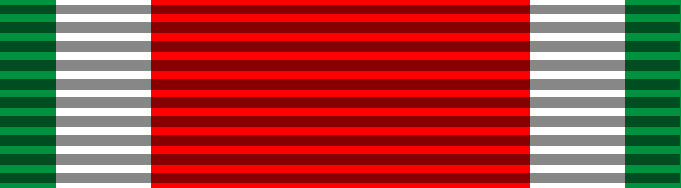
- Awards
- Alexander Shokhin's voice Shokhin on the Echo of Moscow program, 3 June 2012

Alexander Nikolayevich Shokhin (Russian: Александр Николаевич Шохин; born 25 December 1951) is a Russian political and public figure and a Member of the Bureau of the Supreme Council of the party United Russia. He was the Minister of Labour of the Russian SFSR (26 August 1991 – 10 November 1991). From 20 January 1994 to 6 November 1994, he was Minister of the Russian economy, and from 23 March 1994 to 6 November 1994, Deputy Chairman of the Russian Government.

In September 1998, he was appointed Deputy Premier of the Russian Government in the Cabinet of Yevgeny Primakov, but even before the official addition of deputy powers in October 1998, has resigned from this position.

== Biography ==
=== Scientific work ===
In 1974, he graduated from M. V. Lomonosov Moscow State University with a degree in political economy. He is a Doctor of Economics (1989), and Professor (1991).

Since 1969, he has been a laboratory assistant at the MSU Faculty of Economics, then a scientific and technical employee of the Central Economic Mathematical Institute (CEMI) of the Academy of Sciences of the Soviet Union.

From 1974 to 1979, he was a research fellow at the Scientific Research Economic Institute under the USSR State Planning Committee.

In 1978, he defended his thesis for the degree of Candidate of Economic Sciences.

From 1979 to 1982, he was a senior researcher, Head of the sector of the Research Institute of Labor of the USSR State Committee of Labor.

From 1982 to 1986, he was Head of the Laboratory of the Central Research Institute of the USSR Academy of Sciences.

From 1986 to 1987, he was Head of the Laboratory of the Institute of Economics and Forecasting of Scientific and Technological Progress of the USSR Academy of Sciences.

Since 1987, he has been an adviser to the Minister of Foreign Affairs of the USSR, then Head of the Department of International Economic Relations of the USSR Ministry of Foreign Affairs.

From May to August 1991, he was Director of the Institute of Employment Problems of the USSR Academy of Sciences and the USSR State Labor Committee.

=== In the government ===
From 26 August to 10 November 1991, he served as the Minister of Labor of the Russian SFSR.

Since 6 November 1991, he was the Deputy Chairman of the Government of the RSFSR on social policy issues.

From 10 November 1991 to 14 June 1992, he was the Minister of Labor and Employment of the RSFSR/The Russian Federation of the year.

Since 23 December 1992, he was the Deputy Chairman of the Government of the Russian Federation). From 25 December 1993 to 20 January 1994, he was the Deputy Chairman of the Council of Ministers — Government of the Russian Federation.

From 1993 to 1994, he served as the Chairman of the Russian Agency for International Cooperation and Development.

Since December 1993, he has been a deputy of the State Duma of the Federal Assembly of the Russian Federation of the first convocation, a member of the Party of Russian Unity and Accord faction.

From 20 January to 6 November 1994, he was the Minister of Economy of the Russian Federation.

From 23 March to 6 November 1994, he served as the Deputy Chairman of the Government of the Russian Federation.

=== In the State Duma ===
In 1995, he took an active part in the creation of the VOPD "Our Home – Russia", was deputy chairman of the Political Council of the NDR.

Since December 1995, he has been a deputy of the State Duma of the Federal Assembly of the Russian Federation of the second convocation.

From 1996 to 1997, he served as the First Deputy Chairman of the State Duma.

In September 1998, he was appointed Deputy Chairman of the Government of the Russian Federation in the Yevgeny Primakov's Cabinet, but even before the official resignation of his deputy powers in October 1998, he resigned from this position.

Since December 1999, he was the Deputy of the State Duma of the Federal Assembly of the Russian Federation of the third convocation in the Tushinsky electoral district of Moscow as an independent candidate, member of the People's Deputy group, Chairman of the Committee on Credit Organizations and Financial Markets, member of the Commission on Restructuring, Insolvency (Bankruptcy) and Liquidation of Credit Organizations, member of the Commission on Public Debt and Foreign Assets of the Russian Federation, Chairman of the Interdepartmental Commission of the Security Council of Russia on Economic Security, head of the parliamentary delegations to the Parliamentary Assembly of the Council of Europe and the Deputy Chairman of the Parliamentary Assembly of the Council of Europe from Russia.

In October 2002, he prematurely resigned as a deputy of the State Duma of the Federal Assembly of the Russian Federation.

== Public political activity ==
Since 1995, he has been the President of the National Research University Higher School of Economics (HSE).

From 2002 to 2005, he served as the Chairman of the Supervisory Board of the Renaissance Capital Investment Group.

Since February 2003, he has been Chairman of the Expert Council at the Federal Commission of Securities Market of Russia (FCSM of Russia).

Since 2004, he is a member of the United Russia Party.

Since 2004, he is the Vice-President of the Russian Union of Industrialists and Entrepreneurs (RSPP), Chairman of the All-Russian Association of Employers «Coordinating Council of Employers' Associations of Russia».

Since 30 September 2005, he has been President of the Russian Union of Industrialists and Entrepreneurs.

From 2007 to July 2014, he headed the Russian part of the Russian-Chinese Chamber for Trade Promotion of Machine-Technical and Innovative Products, was a member of the Board of Directors of the Russian-Chinese Center for Trade and Economic Cooperation.

Since 2011, he has been a member of the Board of Trustees of the Russian International Affairs Council.

He was a member of the Civic Chamber of the Russian Federation before being elected in 2009 to the Presidium of the General Council of the United Russia. On 30 May 2008, he was elected to the Board of Directors of TGC-10. He has also been a member of the Boards of Directors of Russian Railways and Baltika Breweries Company since 2008.

On 6 February 2012, he was officially registered as a proxy for the presidential candidate of the Russian Federation, at that time the current Prime Minister, Vladimir Putin.

In September 2016, he became a trusted representative of the United Russia Party in 2016 Russian legislative election.

In 2023, he joined the initiative group to nominate Vladimir Putin as a candidate for the 2024 Russian presidential election.

In 2024, he became a confidant of Russian presidential candidate Vladimir Putin.

== Family ==
He is married to Tatiana, and has two children, Dmitry and Evgenia Shokhin, and five grandchildren. Dmitry Shokhin is married to actress Alice Khazanova, daughter of Russian artist Gennady Khazanov.

== Diplomatic rank ==
- Envoy Extraordinary and Plenipotentiary of the 1st class (February 15, 1991)

== Sanctions ==
Since 2014, he is sanctioned by European Union.

He was sanctioned by the UK government in 2022 in relation to the Russo-Ukrainian War.
