= Boris Fyodorov =

Russian politician and economist (1958–2008)

- Борис Фёдоров
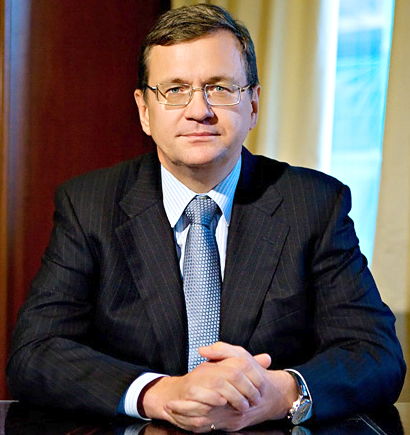
- Fyodorov in 2008

Deputy Prime Minister of Russia
- In office 23 December 1992 – 20 January 1994
- President: Boris Yeltsin
- Premier: Viktor Chernomyrdin
- In office 14 August – 28 September 1998

Minister of Finance of Russia
- In office 26 March 1993 – 26 January 1994
- Premier: Viktor Chernomyrdin
- Preceded by: Vasily Barchuk
- Succeeded by: Sergei Dubinin

Minister of Finance of the RSFSR
- In office 18 July – 15 September 1990
- Premier: Ivan Silayev
- Preceded by: Andrei Bobrovnikov
- Succeeded by: Igor Lazarev

Personal details
- Born: 13 February 1958 Moscow, RSFSR, Soviet Union
- Died: 20 November 2008 (aged 50) London, England
- Party: Communist Party of the Soviet Union (until 1991)
- Profession: Economist

Boris Grigoryevich Fyodorov (Russian: Борис Григорьевич Фёдоров; 13 February 1958 – 20 November 2008) was a Russian economist, politician, and reformer.

== Early life ==
He was awarded a doctor of economics degree from the Moscow Finance Institute and authored over 200 publications.

== Career ==
In 1988 working very closely with Fyodorov, Alexander Zhukov, and Kirill Ugolnikov (Russian: Кирилл Угольников), Deloitte & Touche began providing services to the Soviet Union and continued with Russia. (Note: Kirill Ugolnikov (Russian: Кирилл Угольников) was a General Director of Deloitte & Touche CIS and then became First Deputy Minister for Taxes and Levies of the Russian Federation. Later, he worked as the director of the tax department in the firm Vneshurkollegiya or Vneshyurkollegiya (Russian: директор налогового департамента АО «Внешюрколлегия») The president of Vneshurkollegiya is Alexander Treshchev (Russian: Александр Трещев). Alexander Stanislavovich Treshchev (Russian: Александр Станиславович Трещев; born 28 January 1964, Ozyorsk, Chelyabinsk Oblast, USSR) was the best lawyer in Russia according to the magazine Litsa (Russian: «Лица») in 2002 and 2003, lives in an apartment in Trump Tower, and is a close friend of Donald Trump.) (Note: Viktor Gerashchenko, the Chairman of the Central Bank, stated "In general, we are satisfied with any qualified company with an international reputation, in the current conditions. Therefore, we have no fundamental objections to Deloitte & Touche. But if we talk about their qualification features, which were hinted at here deputy Zhukov, then yes, we know that Alexander Nikolayevich Dumnov works there as a partner, whom I, by the way, recommended to work at the Central Bank back in 1976... He was also the chairman of the board of the East-West investment bank, where Alexander Dmitrievich Zhukov was a member of the board of directors. This bank successfully went bankrupt under the leadership of the notorious Boris Grigorievich Fedorov. And the $11 million building was sold for less than $100,000." In Russian: "Нас в общем-то устраивает любая квалифицированная компания, с международной репутацией, в нынешних условиях. Поэтому у нас нет принципиальных возражений против Deloitte&Touche. Но если говорить про их квалификационные особенности, на которые здесь намекал депутат Жуков, то да, мы знаем, что там работает партнером Думнов Александр Николаевич, которого я, кстати, рекомендовал для работы в Центральном банке еще в 1976 году... Он же был председателем правления инвестиционного банка "Восток-Запад", где Александр Дмитриевич Жуков был членом совета директоров. Банк этот успешно обанкротился под руководством небезызвестного Бориса Григорьевича Федорова. И здание стоимостью в 11 миллионов долларов продали меньше чем за 100 тысяч".)

Fyodorov was Minister of Finance of the Russian SFSR (as a constituent of the USSR) in 1990. From 1991 to 1992 he worked for the European Bank for Reconstruction and Development in London. In 1992 he became director of the World Bank. He served as Finance Minister of Russia from 1993 until 1994, when he resigned. While he was at the Ministry of Finance (MinFin), he brought to MinFin Segei Aleksashenko, Andrey Kazmin, Igor Selivanov, and Mikhail Kasyanov. Fyodorov was a member of the State Duma between 1994 and 1998. From 14 August 1998 until 28 September 1998, he became a tax minister and Deputy Prime Minister of Russia during the Russian financial crisis which began on 17 August 1998.

== United Financial Group ==
In 1994, he and Charles Ryan, a United States banker and Libertarian, founded United Financial Group (UFG), an investment bank with Charles Ryan as its chairman, which, in 2005, was sold to Deutsche Bank. United Financial Group was established with a Moscow-based parent firm and an Isle of Man based United Financial Group firm managing its shell companies around the world. The address (Note: Grosvenor House, 66-67, Athol Street, Douglas) of the Isle of Man-based UFG firm is the same address as the Isle of Man office of Deloitte & Touche.

Fyodorov was a member of various boards including Gazprom, Sberbank and Ingosstrakh.

In February 2002, while Fyodorov was an independent director of Gazprom, he stated that PricewaterhouseCoopers (PwC) signed off on poorly performed audits of natural gas firm interactions such as Gazprom-Itera because PwC wanted to keep the account with Gazprom saying "If an auditor knows it cannot do a proper review, then it is just doing it for the money." Further, he said that any audits by Deloitte & Touche into the Gazprom-Itera interactions were strongly opposed by Gazprom management.

He was also a general partner of UFG Private Equity starting from 2006.

Fyodorov died from a stroke on 20 November 2008 in London, England, at the age of 50.
