= Chairman of the State Duma =

Presiding officer of the lower house of the Russian parliament

Chairman of the State Duma of the Russian Federation
- Председатель Государственной Думы Российской Федерации
- Emblem of the State Duma

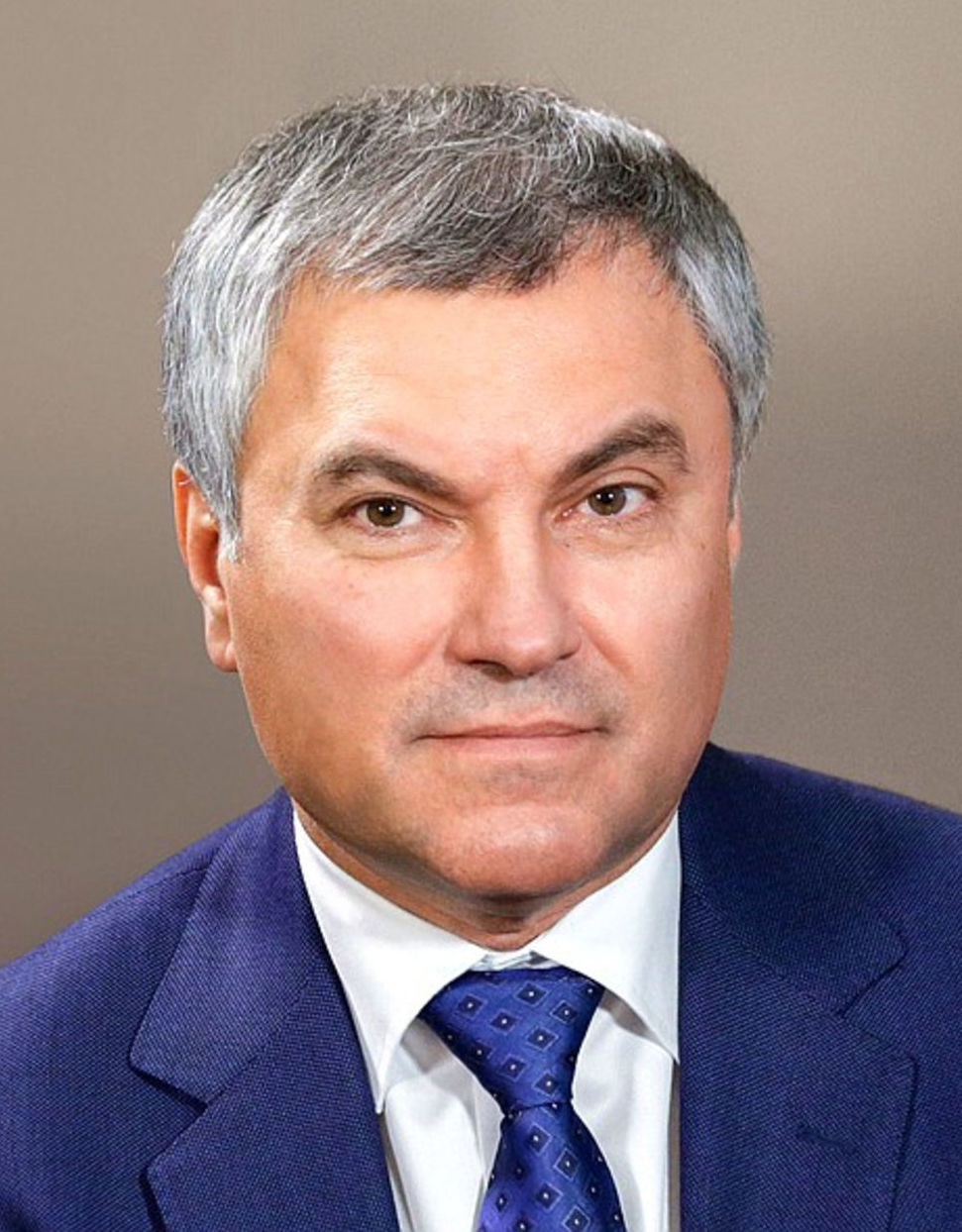
- Incumbent; Vyacheslav Volodin since 5 October 2016
- Appointer: State Duma
- Term length: Five years, renewable
- Formation: 27 April 1906; 120 years ago
- First holder: Sergey Muromtsev
- Unofficial names: Speaker of the State Duma
- Deputy: Deputy Chairman
- Website: Chairman of the State Duma (ru)

The Chairman of the State Duma of the Federal Assembly of the Russian Federation (Russian: Председатель Государственной Думы Федерального собрания Российской Федерации), also informally called Speaker (спикер), is the presiding officer of the lower house of the Russian parliament. It is the fourth highest position, after the President, the Prime Minister and the Chairman of the Federation Council, in the government of Russia. His responsibilities include overseeing the day-to-day business of the State Duma, presiding and maintaining order at the regular sessions of the parliament. The Speaker also chairs the Council of the Duma which includes representatives from all the parliamentary parties and determines the legislative agenda.

The Speaker of the Duma may intervene and express his views but is supposed to be unbiased in his activities at the regular sessions of the parliament.

== History ==
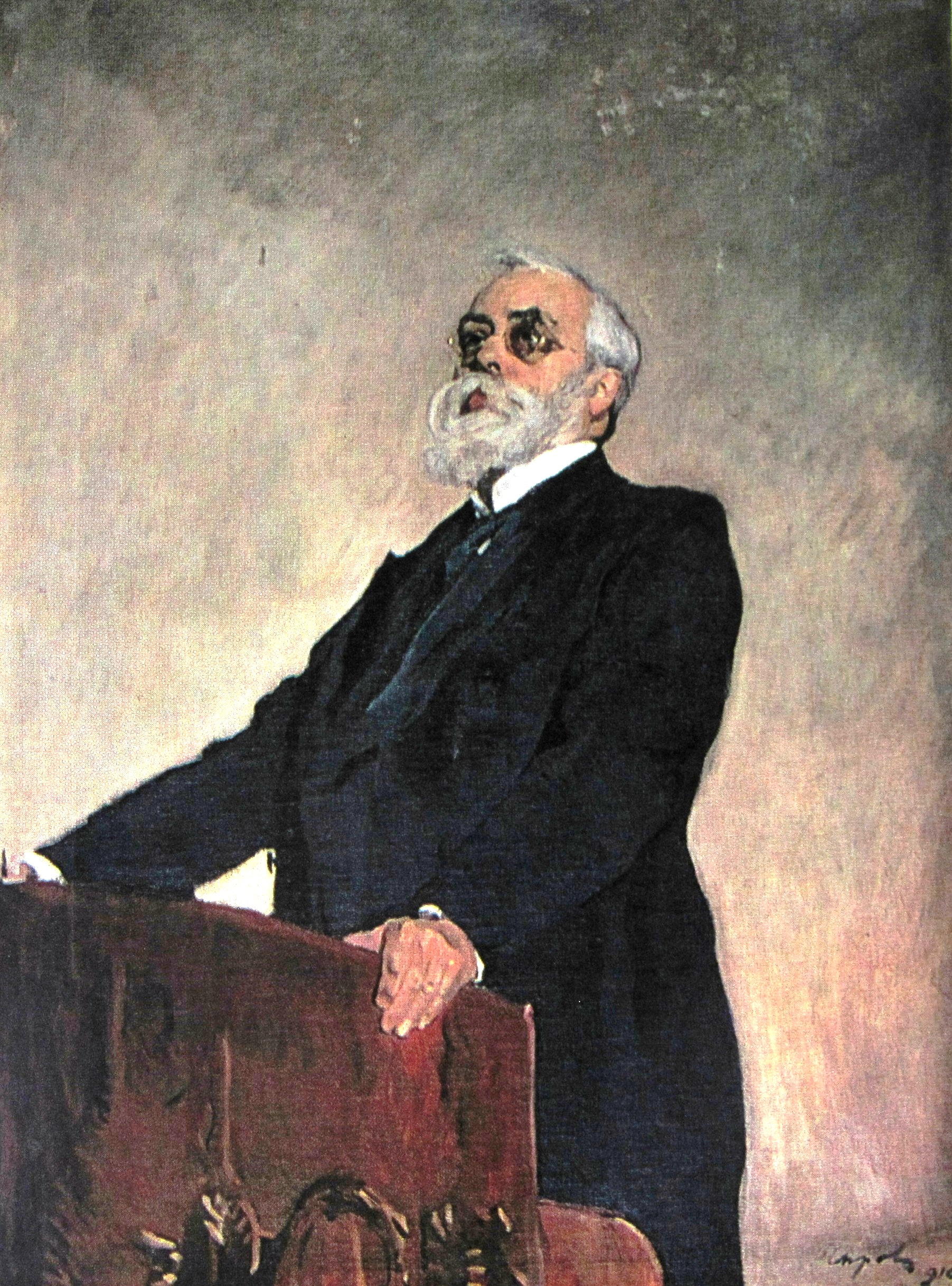
Sergey Muromtsev, the first Chairman of the State Duma

The position Chairman of the State Duma was established in 1906, when the State Duma of the Russian Empire was established. The first chairman was Sergey Muromtsev. This position existed for 11 years during which five people held this position. It was abolished together with the State Duma after the Russian Revolution.

It was restored after 76 years, after the dissolution of the Soviet Union and the constitutional crisis of 1993. The first Chairman of the State Duma after the restoration of the post was Ivan Rybkin.

Since January 1995, the speaker of the State Duma is also a member of the Security Council of the Russian Federation.

Current Chairman Vyacheslav Volodin was elected October 5, 2016.

== Election ==
According to the 101st article of the Russian Constitution and the Regulations of the State Duma, the Chairman is elected from among its members by secret ballot, using ballot papers of the candidates who have the right to nominate deputy associations and deputies. State Duma may decide to hold an open vote.

=== Latest election results ===
Candidate	Votes	%
√ Vyacheslav Volodin (UR)	360	80.0%
Dmitry Novikov (CPRF)	61	13.6%
Not voting	29	6.4%

== Mission and authority ==
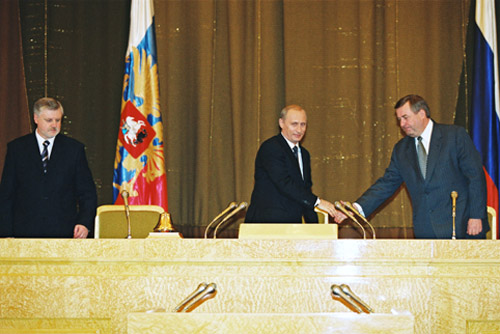
Chairman Gennadiy Seleznyov (right) with President Vladimir Putin and Chairman of the Federation Council Sergey Mironov during the 2002 Presidential Address to the Federal Assembly.

According to Article 11 of the Regulations of the State Duma, the Chairman is allowed to:

- Preside over the meetings of the chamber;
- Responsible for the internal regulations of the chamber in accordance with the Russian Constitution and the powers vested in it by the Regulations of the state Duma;
- Organizes the work of the Council of the State Duma;
- Performs General management of activity of the State Duma Apparatus;
- Appoints and dismisses the Chief of staff of the State Duma with the consent of the Council of the State Duma and the submission of the State Duma Committee on Rules and organization of work of the State Duma appoints and dismisses the first Deputy Chief of staff and Vice Chief of staff of the State Duma on representation of the Head of the State Duma Apparatus;
  - Decides on the granting of certain powers to the Chief of staff of the State Duma, including these rules and Regulations, the first Deputy Head of the State Duma Apparatus;
  - Makes the decision about giving the Apparatus of the State Duma of separate budgetary powers of the main administrator of budget funds chief administrator of Federal budget revenues, chief administrator of sources of financing the Federal budget deficit;
  - Approves the budget estimates of the State Duma for the next financial year;
- Represents the chamber in relations with the Russian President, the Federation Council, the Government, Federal entities, the Constitutional Court, Supreme Court, Prosecutor General, Central electoral Commission, the Central Bank, the Commissioner for human rights, the accounting chamber, public associations, other organizations and officials, as well as with parliaments of foreign States, high officials of foreign States and international organizations;
- Involved in conciliation procedures used by the President in accordance with article 85 (part 1) of the Constitution of Russia to resolve disagreements between bodies of state power of the Russian Federation and bodies of state power of subjects of the Russian Federation, as well as between bodies of state power of subjects of the Russian Federation;
- Directs submitted to the State Duma a bill and materials to it at a fraction for information and the Committee of the State Duma in accordance with the issues of reference
  - Instructs the Scientific Council to lawmaking, to conduct the examination under consideration of the State Duma of the bill;
  - Directs the conclusion by results of examination of the bill in Committee of the State Duma;
- Sign resolutions of the State Duma;
- Send to the Federation Council for consideration approved by the State Duma draft laws on amendments to the Russian Constitution, Federal constitutional laws and Federal laws;
- Directs the President of Russia Federal laws passed by the State Duma in accordance with article 105 (part 5) of the Constitution of the Russian Federation;
- Issues orders and instructions on issues referred to its competence;
- Directs submitted to the State Duma a draft resolution of the State Duma and materials to it to the relevant Committee for consideration and sets the period of preparation of the draft resolution of the State Duma for consideration by the chamber;
- Directs the conclusions of Public Chamber by results of examination of the bill in Committee of the State Duma;
  - Directs submitted to the State Duma projects of the state programs of Russia, including the Federal target programmes and proposals for amendments to the state program of Russia, including Federal programs, to the committees of the State Duma Committee on budget and taxes for its consideration;
  - Directs submitted to the State Duma draft guidelines for the budget policy of the Russian Federation, the draft guidelines for tax policy of the Russian Federation, the draft guidelines for customs tariff policy of the Russian Federation and draft budget forecast (draft amendments budget forecast) of the Russian Federation for the long term in the State Duma Committee on budget and taxes for its consideration;
  - In the period between sessions of the State Duma forwards the draft main directions of budget policy of the Russian Federation, the draft guidelines for tax policy of the Russian Federation, the draft guidelines for customs tariff policy of the Russian Federation and draft budget forecast (draft amendments budget forecast) of the Russian Federation for the long term in the Federation Council;
  - Directs submitted to the State Duma the Government of Russia about the development and expected timing of adoption of normative legal acts, development and adoption of which is stipulated by Federal laws in the relevant committees;
  - Directs submitted to the State Duma the report of the Government of Russia about the results of work on realization of agreements on production section during the reporting period, the State Duma Committee on budget and taxes;
  - Directs submitted to the State Duma proposals of the accounting chamber of Russia on suspension of all kinds of financial payments and settlement operations under accounts of the auditees (control) in the State Duma Committee on budget and taxes;
- In the period between sessions of the State Duma sends within three days of receipt of the conclusion of the State Duma Committee on budget and taxes the draft Federal law on the Federal budget for the next fiscal year and planovyi and the draft Federal laws on budgets of state extrabudgetary funds of the Russian Federation for the next financial year and planning period in the committees, commissions of the State Duma and in the faction in the State Duma, the Russian President, the Federation Council, the Government of Russia and the Accounts chamber;
- In the period between sessions of the State Duma appoints the State Duma Committee on budget and taxation responsible for the project of the Federal law on the Federal budget for the next financial year and planning period and the draft Federal laws on budgets of state extrabudgetary funds of the Russian Federation for the next financial year and planning period and the relevant committees on the draft Federal laws and their preparation for consideration by the chamber;
- In the period between sessions of the State Duma includes the draft Federal law on the Federal budget for the next financial year and planning period and the draft Federal laws on budgets of state extrabudgetary funds of the Russian Federation for the next financial year and planning period in the approximate program of legislative work of the State Duma for the current or for the next session;
- In the period between sessions of the State Duma makes the decision on the basis of the conclusion of the State Duma Committee on budget and taxes on the return of the draft Federal law on the Federal budget for the next financial year and planning period in the government of the Russian Federation for revision;
- Inviting Federal Ministers and other officials for answers to questions of deputies of the State Duma;
  - Making a submission on the appointment and early termination of powers of representatives of the State Duma of the members of the Supervisory boards of the organisations created by the Russian Federation on the basis of Federal laws, as well as representatives of the State Duma in the other created by the Russian Federation authorities and organizations;
  - Directs the invitation of the Government of Russia to take part in the work of the governmental Commission on investigation of causes of the occurrence of circumstances of an extraordinary nature and liquidation of their consequences to the relevant Committee to prepare proposals on the composition of representatives of the State Duma in the government of the commission;
- Exercise other powers prescribed by the Regulations of the State Duma.

Chairman of the State Duma in its sole discretion, to include in the draft procedure of work of the State Dumblebee questions:

- On the election for the vacant position of Deputy Chairman of the State Duma;
- About the vacancies in the committees and commissions of the State Duma.

Chairman of the State Duma or on behalf of one of his assistants represents the State Duma reports on the activities of the chamber over the past session about the project and the approximate program of legislative work of the State Duma for the current session. On these reports, the State Duma can make the decision.

Chairman of the State Duma has the right to speak at a meeting of the State Duma on the issues attributed to its competence by the present Regulations, and issues within the jurisdiction of the State Duma of the Russian Federation Constitution, Federal constitutional laws and Federal laws. The Chairman of the State Duma for performance is given up to ten minutes.

Chairman of the State Duma has the right to decide issues of expert, scientific, consultative and other support of legislative activity of the State Duma. On matters associated with the expert support of the legislative process in the State Duma and the improvement of the legislation of the Russian Federation, Chairman of the State Duma creates a Scientific Council for law-making.

State Duma has the right to cancel any order, the order of the chairman.

== Living former Chairmen ==
As of September 2026, there are three living former chairmen. The most recent death of a former chairman was that of Gennadiy Seleznyov (1996–2003) on 19 July 2015, aged 67.

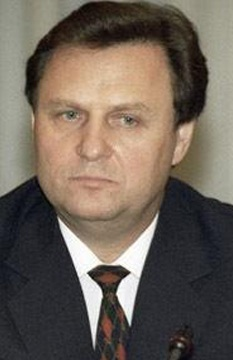
Ivan Rybkin
served: 1994–1996
born: 20 October 1946 (age 79)

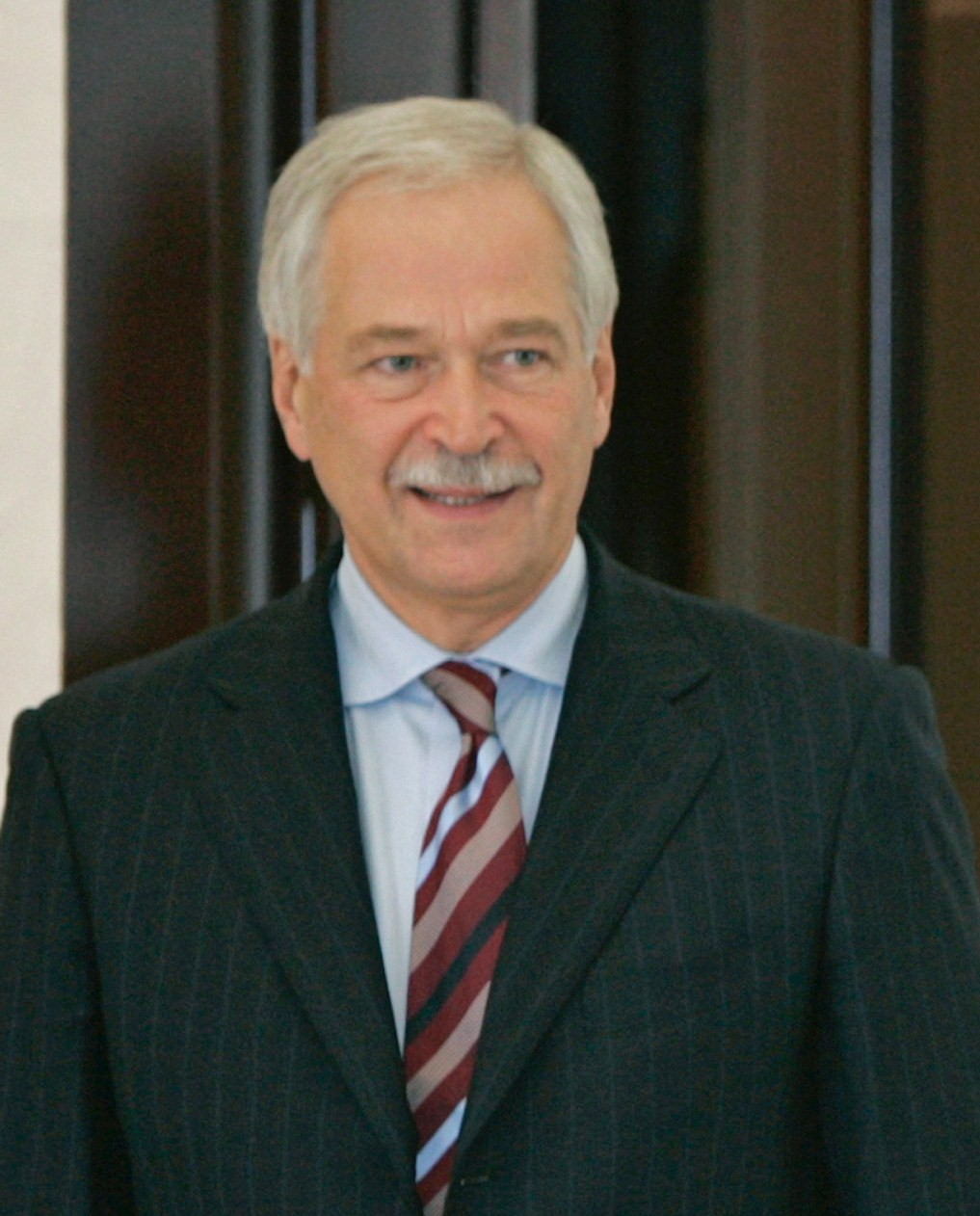
Boris Gryzlov
served: 2003–2011
born: 15 December 1950 (age 75)

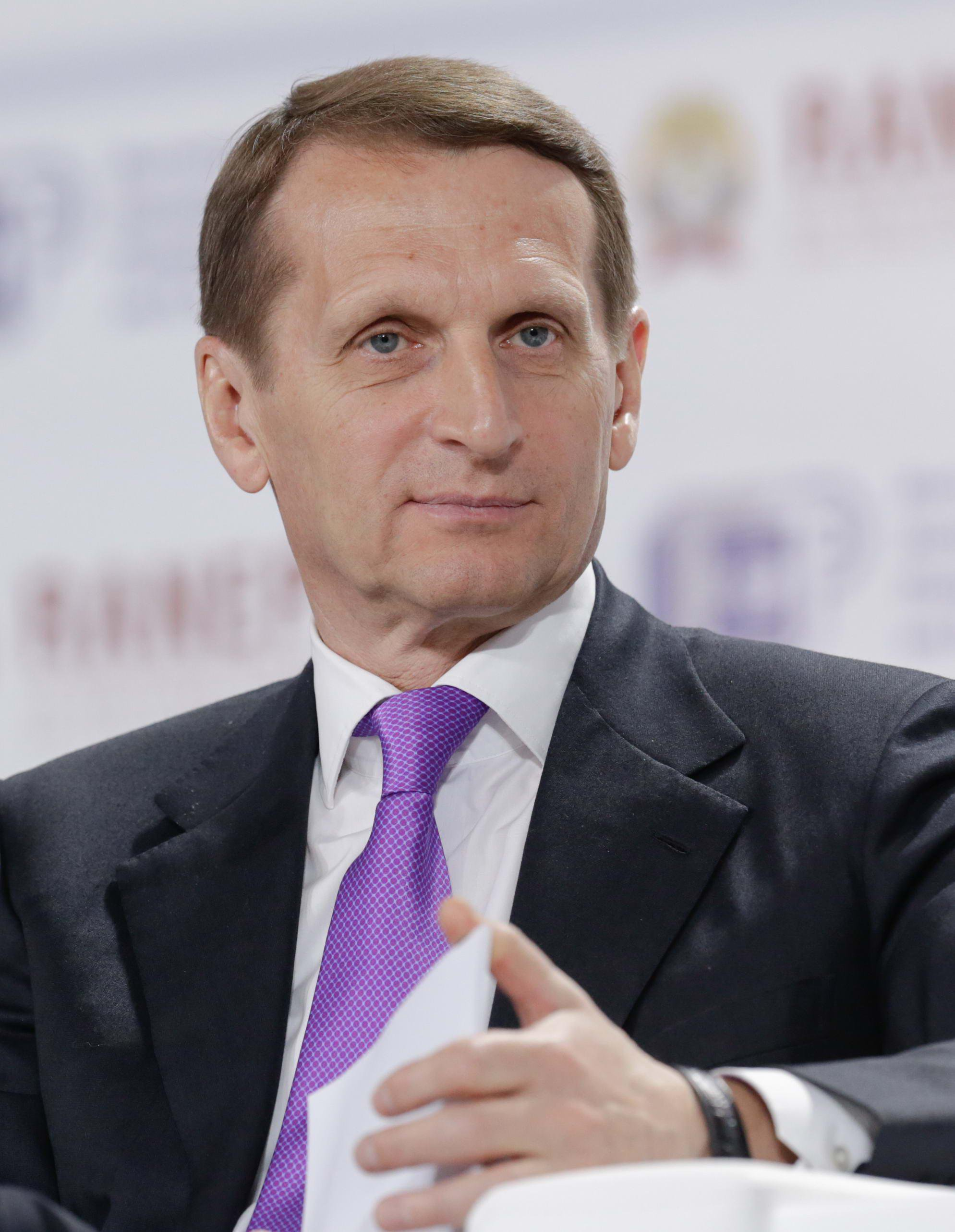
Sergey Naryshkin
served: 2011–2016
born: 27 October 1954 (age 71)

== See also ==
- Chairman of the Federation Council
- List of Deputy Chairmen of the State Duma
