= List of energy ministers of Russia =

This is a list of ministers of energy of Russia.

== Russian SFSR ==
=== Minister of Energy and Electrification ===
Minister	Political party	Term of office	
Alexander Bizyayev	Communist Party	13 October 1962	18 March 1963

=== Ministers of Fuel and Energy ===
Minister	Political party	Term of office		Cabinet
Anatoly Dyakov	Communist Party	13 May 1991	10 November 1991	Silayev I
Anatoly Dyakov	Communist Party	13 May 1991	10 November 1991	Silayev II
Vladimir Lopukhin	Independent	10 November 1991	16 May 1992	Yeltsin–Gaidar

== Russian Federation ==
=== Ministers of Fuel and Energy ===
Minister	Political party	Term of office		Cabinet
Vladimir Lopukhin	Independent	16 May 1992	30 May 1992	Yeltsin–Gaidar
Office vacant		30 May 1992	12 January 1993	Yeltsin–Gaidar
Yuri Shafranik	Independent	12 January 1993	22 August 1996	Chernomyrdin I
Pyotr Rodionov	Independent	22 August 1996	9 April 1997	Chernomyrdin II
Viktor Ott (acting)	Independent	10 April 1997	24 April 1997	Chernomyrdin II
Boris Nemtsov	Independent	24 April 1997	20 November 1997	Chernomyrdin II
Sergey Kiriyenko	Independent	20 November 1997	23 March 1998	Chernomyrdin II
Viktor Ott (acting)	Independent	23 March 1998	30 March 1998	Chernomyrdin II
Sergey Generalov	Independent	12 May 1998	25 May 1999	Kiriyenko
Sergey Generalov	Independent	12 May 1998	25 May 1999	Primakov
Viktor Kalyuzhny	Independent	25 May 1999	20 May 2000	Stepashin
Viktor Kalyuzhny	Independent	25 May 1999	20 May 2000	Putin I

=== Ministers of Energy ===
Minister	Political party	Term of office		Cabinet
Alexander Gavrin	Fatherland – All Russia	20 May 2000	5 February 2001	Kasyanov
1st Deputy Minister (acting)	Independent	5 February 2001	16 June 2001	Kasyanov
Igor Yusufov	Independent	16 June 2001	9 March 2004	Kasyanov

=== Minister of Industry and Energy ===
Minister	Political party	Term of office		Cabinet
Viktor Khristenko	Independent	9 March 2004	12 May 2008	Fradkov I
Viktor Khristenko	Independent	9 March 2004	12 May 2008	Fradkov II
Viktor Khristenko	Independent	9 March 2004	12 May 2008	Zubkov

=== Ministers of Energy ===
Minister	Political party	Term of office		Cabinet
Sergei Shmatko	United Russia	12 May 2008	21 May 2012	Putin II
Alexander Novak	United Russia	21 May 2012	10 November 2020	Medvedev I
Alexander Novak	United Russia	21 May 2012	10 November 2020	Medvedev II
Alexander Novak	United Russia	21 May 2012	10 November 2020	Mishustin I
Nikolay Shulginov	Independent	10 November 2020	14 May 2024	Mishustin I
Sergey Tsivilyov	United Russia	14 May 2024	Incumbent	Mishustin II

== See also ==
- Energy law
