= Deputy Chairman of the Government (Russia) =

Position within the Government of Russia

A Deputy Chairman of the Government of the Russian Federation (Russian: Заместитель председателя Правительства Российской Федерации, romanized: Zamestitel predsedatelya Pravitelstva Rossiyskoy Federatsii) is a member of the Government of Russia. The post is commonly referred to as "vice premier" both in and outside of Russia. According to the Chapter 6, Article 110 of the Constitution of Russia, "The Government of the Russian Federation consists of the chairman of the Government of the Russian Federation, Deputy Chairman of the Government of the Russian Federation and federal ministries". Article 112 states that the Chairman of the Government (Prime Minister) recommends candidates for the post of deputy chairmen to the President of Russia. The role of deputy chairmen of government of the Russian Federation is to coordinate the activities of federal government bodies and carry out other tasks in response to particular issues or events. The most senior of them is the First Deputy Prime Minister of Russia.

== Current deputy prime ministers ==
Dmitry Grigorenko	Dmitry Patrushev	Vitaly Savelyev	Marat Khusnullin	Yury Trutnev	Alexey Overchuk	Tatyana Golikova	Dmitry Chernyshenko	Alexander Novak
Deputy Prime Minister – Chief of Staff of the Government	Deputy Prime Minister	Deputy Prime Minister	Deputy Prime Minister	Deputy Prime Minister – Presidential Envoy to the Far Eastern Federal District	Deputy Prime Minister	Deputy Prime Minister	Deputy Prime Minister	Deputy Prime Minister - for Fuel Energy complex

== Complete list of deputy prime ministers ==
The following is a list of all individuals who have held the office of Deputy Chairman of Government in the Russian Federation since 1991, as well as the cabinets that they were part of.

Name	Entered office	Left office	Notes	Cabinet
Gennady Burbulis	6 November 1991	14 April 1992	First deputy	Gaidar–Yeltsin
Alexander Shokhin	6 November 1991	20 January 1994		Gaidar–Yeltsin; Chernomyrdin I
Yegor Gaidar	6 November 1991	15 December 1992	First deputy – from 2 March 1992 interim Prime Minister – from 15 June	Gaidar–Yeltsin
Sergey Shakhray	12 December 1991	20 April 1992		Gaidar–Yeltsin
Mikhail Poltoranin	22 February 1992	25 November 1992		Gaidar–Yeltsin
Valery Makharadze	2 March 1992	23 December 1992		Gaidar–Yeltsin
Georgy Khizha	20 May 1992	11 May 1993		Gaidar–Yeltsin; Chernomyrdin I
Victor Chernomyrdin	30 May 1992	14 December 1992		Gaidar–Yeltsin
Anatoly Chubais	1 June 1992	16 January 1996	First deputy – from 5 November 1994	Gaidar–Yeltsin; Chernomyrdin I
Vladimir Shumeyko	2 June 1992	20 January 1994	First deputy	Gaidar–Yeltsin; Chernomyrdin I
Boris Saltykov	4 June 1992	25 March 1993		Gaidar–Yeltsin; Chernomyrdin I
Serg Shakhrai	11 November 1992	20 January 1994		Gaidar–Yeltsin; Chernomyrdin I
Yury Yarov	23 December 1992	24 July 1996		Gaidar–Yeltsin; Chernomyrdin I
Boris Fyodorov	23 December 1992	20 January 1994		Chernomyrdin I
Alexander Zaveryukha	10 February 1993	17 March 1997		Chernomyrdin I Chernomyrdin II
Oleg Lobov	25 April 1993	18 September 1993	First deputy	Chernomyrdin I
Oleg Soskovets	30 April 1993	20 June 1996	First deputy	Chernomyrdin I
Yegor Gaidar	18 September 1993	20 January 1994	First deputy	Chernomyrdin I
Alexander Shokhin	23 March 1994	6 November 1994		Chernomyrdin I
Sergei Shakhrai	7 April 1994	5 January 1996		Chernomyrdin I
Oleg Davydov	9 November 1994	17 March 1997		Chernomyrdin I Chernomyrdin II
Alexei Bolshakov	9 November 1994	17 March 1997	First deputy – from 14 August 1996	Chernomyrdin I Chernomyrdin II
Vladimir Polevanov	25 November 1994	24 January 1995		Chernomyrdin I
Nikolai Yegorov	7 December 1994	30 June 1995		Chernomyrdin I
Vitaly Ignatenko	31 May 1995	17 March 1997		Chernomyrdin I Chernomyrdin II
Vladimir Kinelyov	6 January 1996	14 August 1996		Chernomyrdin I
Vladimir Kadannikov	25 January 1996	14 August 1996	First deputy	Chernomyrdin I
Alexander Kazakov	25 January 1996	19 July 1996		Chernomyrdin I
Oleg Lobov	18 June 1996	17 March 1997	First deputy – until 14 August 1996	Chernomyrdin I Chernomyrdin II
Victor Ilyushin	14 August 1996	17 March 1997	First deputy	Chernomyrdin II
Vladimir Potanin	14 August 1996	17 March 1997	First deputy	Chernomyrdin II
Vladimir Babichev	14 August 1996	17 March 1997		Chernomyrdin II
Alexander Livshits	14 August 1996	17 March 1997		Chernomyrdin II
Valery Serov	14 August 1996	28 February 1998		Chernomyrdin II
Vladimir Fortov	17 August 1996	17 March 1997		Chernomyrdin II
Anatoly Kulikov	4 February 1997	23 March 1998	simultaneously Minister of Internal Affairs	Chernomyrdin II
Anatoly Chubais	7 March 1997	23 March 1998	First deputy	Chernomyrdin II
Oleg Sysuyev	17 March 1997	16 September 1998		Chernomyrdin II; Kiriyenko
Alfred Koch	17 March 1997	13 August 1997		Chernomyrdin II
Yakov Urinson	17 March 1997	30 April 1998		Chernomyrdin II
Boris Nemtsov	17 March 1997	28 August 1998	First deputy – until 28 April 1998	Chernomyrdin II; Kiriyenko
Vladimir Bulgak	17 March 1997	30 April 1998		Chernomyrdin II
Victor Khlystun	19 May 1997	24 April 1998		Chernomyrdin II
Ramazan Abdulatipov	1 August 1997	24 April 1998		Chernomyrdin II
Maxim Boycko	13 August 1997	15 November 1997		Chernomyrdin II
Farit Gazizullin	20 December 1997	24 April 1998		Chernomyrdin II
Ivan Rybkin	2 March 1998	24 April 1998		Chernomyrdin II
Sergei Kiriyenko	23 March 1998	24 April 1998	First deputy interim Prime Minister	Chernomyrdin II
Viktor Khristenko	28 April 1998	28 September 1998		Kiriyenko
Boris Fyodorov	17 August 1998	28 September 1998		Primakov
Yury Maslyukov	11 September 1998	19 May 1999	First deputy	Primakov
Vladimir Bulgak	16 September 1998	19 May 1999		Primakov
Vladimir Ryzhkov (Note: Ryzhkov was appointed to the position, but five days later he declined the appointment, so whether he technically was in office or not is ambiguous.: UPI Focus: Yeltsin appoints new deputy premiers. Published 16 September 1998. UPI.; The historian with a knack for negotiation. Published 11 April 2012. Russia Beyond the Headlines.)	16 September 1998	21 September 1998	declined his post after five days	Primakov
Alexander Shokhin	26 September 1998	30 September 1998		Primakov
Vadim Gustov	18 September 1998	27 April 1999	First deputy	Primakov
Gennady Kulik	21 September 1998	19 May 1999		Primakov
Valentina Matviyenko	24 September 1998	11 March 2003	Welfare	Primakov; Stepashin; Putin I Kasyanov
Sergei Stepashin	27 April 1999	19 May 1999	First deputy interim Prime Minister – from May 12	Primakov
Nikolai Aksyonenko	21 May 1999	10 January 2000	First deputy	Stepashin; Putin I
Mikhail Zadornov	25 May 1999	28 May 1999	First deputy	Stepashin
Vladimir Shcherbak	25 May 1999	7 May 2000		Stepashin; Putin I
Viktor Khristenko	31 May 1999	9 March 2004	First deputy – until 10 January 2000	Stepashin; Putin I Kasyanov
Ilya Klebanov	31 May 1999	18 February 2002		Stepashin; Putin I Kasyanov
Vladimir Putin	9 August 1999	16 August 1999	First deputy interim Prime Minister	Stepashin
Mikhail Kasyanov	10 January 2000	17 May 2000	First deputy interim Prime Minister – from 7 May 2000	Putin I
Sergey Shoigu	10 January 2000	18 May 2000	simultaneously Minister of Emergency Situations	Putin I
Alexei Kudrin	18 May 2000	9 March 2004	simultaneously Minister of Finance	Kasyanov
Alexei Gordeyev	20 May 2000	9 March 2004		Kasyanov
Boris Alyoshin	24 April 2003	9 March 2004		Kasyanov
Galina Karyelova	24 April 2003	9 March 2004		Kasyanov
Alexander Zhukov	9 March 2004	20 December 2011		Frakov I Fradkov II; Zubkov; Putin II
Dmitry Medvedev	9 March 2004	7 May 2008		Fradkov I Fradkov II; Zubkov
Sergei Ivanov	14 November 2005	22 December 2011	simultaneously Minister of Defense; First deputy (2007–2008)	Fradkov II; Zubkov; Putin II
Sergei Naryshkin	25 February 2007	12 May 2008		Fradkov II; Zubkov
Alexei Kudrin	24 September 2007	26 September 2011	simultaneously Minister of Finance	Zubkov; Putin II
Viktor Zubkov	12 May 2008	21 May 2012	First deputy	Putin II
Igor Shuvalov	12 May 2008	18 May 2018	First deputy	Putin II; Medvedev I
Igor Sechin	12 May 2008	21 May 2012		Putin II
Sergei Sobyanin	12 May 2008	21 October 2010		Putin II
Dmitry Kozak	14 October 2008	21 January 2020		Putin II; Medvedev I Medvedev II
Alexander Khloponin	19 January 2010	18 May 2018	simultaneously Presidential Envoy to the North Caucasian Federal District – until 12 May 2014	Putin II; Medvedev I
Vyacheslav Volodin	21 October 2010	27 December 2011		Putin II
Dmitry Rogozin	23 December 2011	18 May 2018		Putin II; Medvedev I
Vladislav Surkov	27 December 2011	8 May 2013		Putin II; Medvedev I
Arkady Dvorkovich	21 May 2012	18 May 2018		Medvedev I
Olga Golodets	21 May 2012	21 January 2020		Medvedev I Medvedev II
Sergei Prikhodko	22 May 2013	18 May 2018		Medvedev I
Yury Trutnev	31 August 2013		simultaneously Presidential Envoy to the Far Eastern Federal District	Medvedev I Medvedev II; Mishustin
Vitaly Mutko	30 October 2016	21 January 2020		Medvedev I Medvedev II
Anton Siluanov	18 May 2018	21 January 2020	First deputy	Medvedev II
Alexey Gordeyev	18 May 2018	21 January 2020		Medvedev II
Konstantin Chuychenko	18 May 2018	21 January 2020		Medvedev II
Yury Borisov	18 May 2018	15 July 2022		Medvedev II; Mishustin
Tatyana Golikova	18 May 2018			Medvedev II; Mishustin Mishustin II
Maxim Akimov	18 May 2018	21 January 2020		Medvedev II
Andrey Belousov	21 January 2020	7 May 2024	First deputy	Mishustin
Dmitry Grigorenko	21 January 2020			Mishustin Mishustin II
Viktoria Abramchenko	21 January 2020	7 May 2024		Mishustin
Marat Khusnullin	21 January 2020			Mishustin Mishustin II
Alexey Overchuk	21 January 2020			Mishustin Mishustin II
Dmitry Chernyshenko	21 January 2020			Mishustin Mishustin II
Alexander Novak	10 November 2020			Mishustin Mishustin II
Denis Manturov	15 July 2022		First Deputy	Mishustin Mishustin II
Dmitry Patrushev	14 May 2024			Mishustin II
Vitaly Savelyev	14 May 2024			Mishustin II

== See also ==
- First Deputy Prime Minister of Russia
