= Vladimir Putin's Cabinet =

Vladimir Putin's Cabinet of the government of Russia may refer to:

- Vladimir Putin's First Cabinet (August 16, 1999 to May 7, 2000)
- Vladimir Putin's Second Cabinet (May 8, 2008 to May 7, 2012)

== See also ==
- Mikhail Kasyanov's Cabinet, cabinet of Putin's first presidential term
- Mikhail Mishustin's Second Cabinet, current cabinet since 2024
