= Sergei Stepashin's Cabinet =

Cabinet of Sergey Stepashin
- 47th Cabinet of Russia

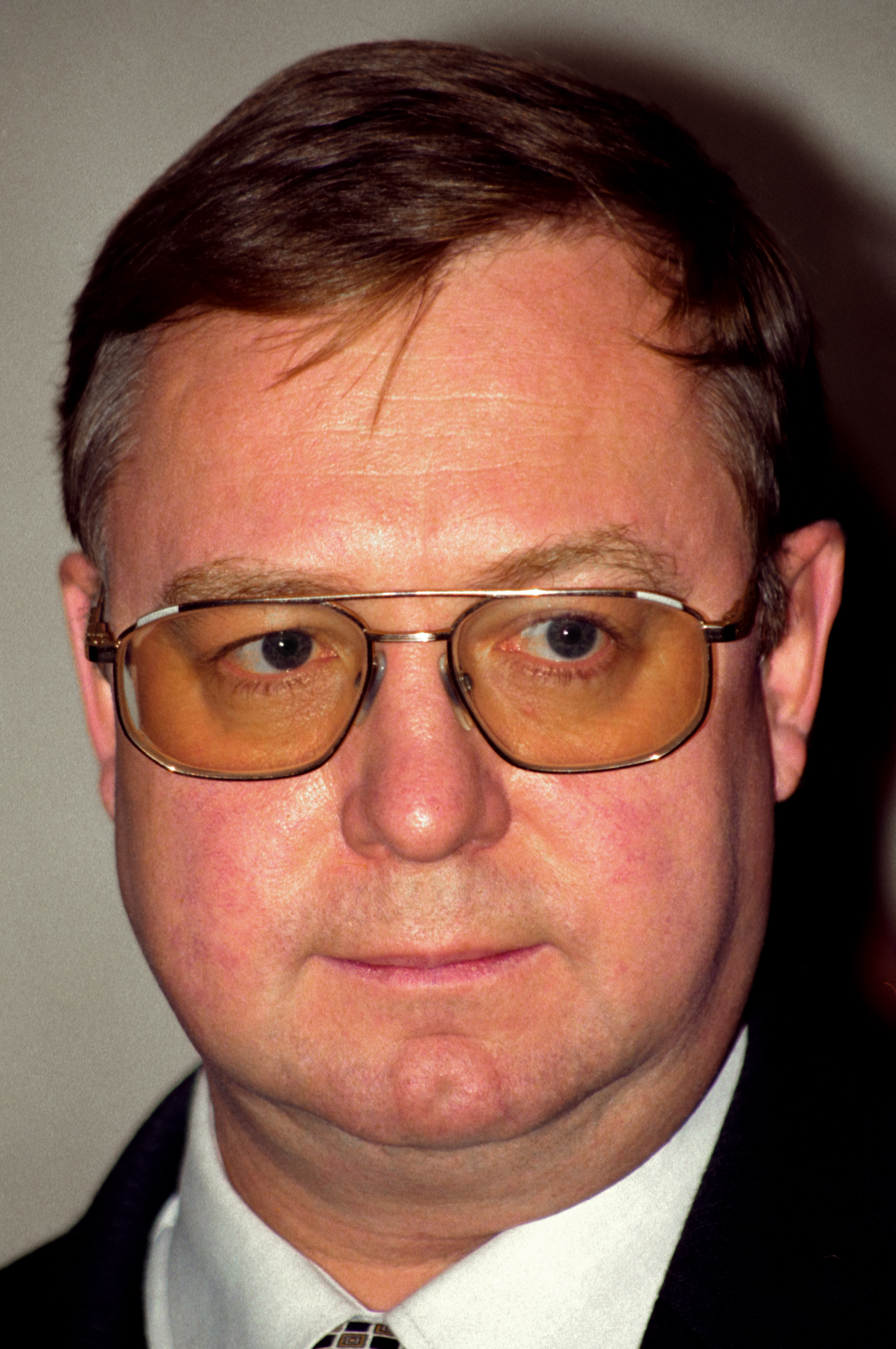
- Date formed: 19 May 1999
- Date dissolved: 9 August 1999

People and organisations
- Head of state: Boris Yeltsin
- Head of government: Sergei Stepashin
- Deputy head of government: Nikolai Aksyonenko; Viktor Khristenko; Mikhail Zadornov
- No. of ministers: 33
- Member party: Our Home - Russia; Democratic Choice of Russia; Liberal Democratic Party
- Status in legislature: Coalition
- Opposition party: Communist Party
- Opposition leader: Gennady Zyuganov

History
- Predecessor: Primakov
- Successor: Putin I

Sergei Stepashin's Cabinet was the Cabinet of Russian Prime Minister Sergei Stepashin from May to August 1999. The Cabinet served under the presidency of Boris Yeltsin.

Upon his appointment as Prime Minister (by a Duma vote of 301 to 55), Stepashin publicly identified a series of problems that he said faced the country, including high rates of poverty, low industrial output, high public debt and a weak legal environment.

The Cabinet, and Stepashin's premiership, lasted only until August, when Yeltsin dismissed them. Stepashin stated upon his removal that "these three months haven't been wasted, we have managed to keep the situation in the country under control. The ruble hasn't plunged contrary to many predictions". Stepashin was replaced by Vladimir Putin.

== Members ==
Members of the Cabinet:

Portfolio	Minister	Took office	Left office	Party
Prime Minister	Sergei Stepashin	19 May 1999	9 August 1999	Independent
Prime Minister	Vladimir Putin (acting)	9 August 1999	19 August 1999	Independent
First Deputy Prime Minister	Nikolay Aksyonenko	21 May 1999	19 August 1999	Independent
First Deputy Prime Minister	Mikhail Zadornov	25 May 1999	28 May 1999	Independent
First Deputy Prime Minister	Viktor Khristenko	31 May 1999	19 August 1999	NDR
First Deputy Prime Minister	Vladimir Putin	9 August 1999	19 August 1999	Independent
Deputy Prime Minister	Valentina Matviyenko	25 May 1999	19 August 1999	Independent
Deputy Prime Minister; Minister of Agriculture and Food	Vladimir Shcherbak	25 May 1999	19 August 1999	Independent
Deputy Prime Minister	Ilya Klebanov	31 May 1999	19 August 1999	Independent
Minister of Antimonopoly Policy and Entrepreneurship Support	Ilya Yuzhanov	31 May 1999	19 August 1999	DVR
Minister of Atomic Energy	Yevgeny Adamov	25 May 1999	19 August 1999	Independent
Minister for Commonwealth of Independent States Affairs	Leonid Drachevsky	25 May 1999	19 August 1999	Independent
Minister of Culture	Vladimir Yegorov	25 May 1999	19 August 1999	Independent
Minister of Defence	Igor Sergeyev	21 May 1999	19 August 1999	Independent
Minister of Economy	Andrei Shapovalyants	31 May 1999	19 August 1999	Independent
Minister of Education	Vladimir Filippov	25 May 1999	19 August 1999	Independent
Minister of Emergency Situations	Sergei Shoigu	21 May 1999	19 August 1999	NDR
Minister of Federation and Nationalities Affairs	Vyacheslav Mikhailov	25 May 1999	19 August 1999	Independent
Minister of Finance	Mikhail Kasyanov	25 May 1999	19 August 1999	Independent
Minister of Foreign Affairs	Igor Ivanov	21 May 1999	19 August 1999	Independent
Minister of Fuel and Energy	Viktor Kalyuzhny	25 May 1999	19 August 1999	Independent
Minister of Health	Yuri Shevchenko	5 July 1999	19 August 1999	Independent
Minister of Trade	Mikhail Fradkov	25 May 1999	19 August 1999	Independent
Minister of Internal Affairs	Vladimir Rushailo	21 May 1999	19 August 1999	Independent
Minister of Justice	Pavel Krasheninnikov	21 May 1999	19 August 1999	Independent
Minister of Labour and Social Development	Sergei Kalashnikov	25 May 1999	19 August 1999	LDPR
Minister of Natural Resources	Viktor Orlov	25 May 1999	19 August 1999	Independent
Minister of Physical Culture, Sport and Tourism	Boris Ivanyuzhenkov	24 June 1999	19 August 1999	Independent
Minister of Press, Broadcasting and Mass Media	Mikhail Lesin	6 July 1999	19 August 1999	Independent
Minister of State Property	Farit Gazizullin	25 May 1999	19 August 1999	Independent
Minister of Science and Technologies	Mikhail Kirpichnikov	25 May 1999	19 August 1999	Independent
Minister of Taxes and Duties	Alexander Pochinok	25 May 1999	19 August 1999	DVR
Minister of Transport	Sergey Frank	25 May 1999	19 August 1999	Independent
Minister of the Russian Federation	Ramazan Abdulatipov	25 May 1999	19 August 1999	PRES
Minister of the Russian Federation	Aleksandr Livshits	28 June 1999	19 August 1999	Independent
Minister of the Russian Federation — Chief of Staff of the Government	Andrei Chernenko	25 May 1999	19 August 1999	Independent
