= Viktor Zubkov's Cabinet =

Cabinet of Viktor Zubkov
- 52nd Cabinet of Russia

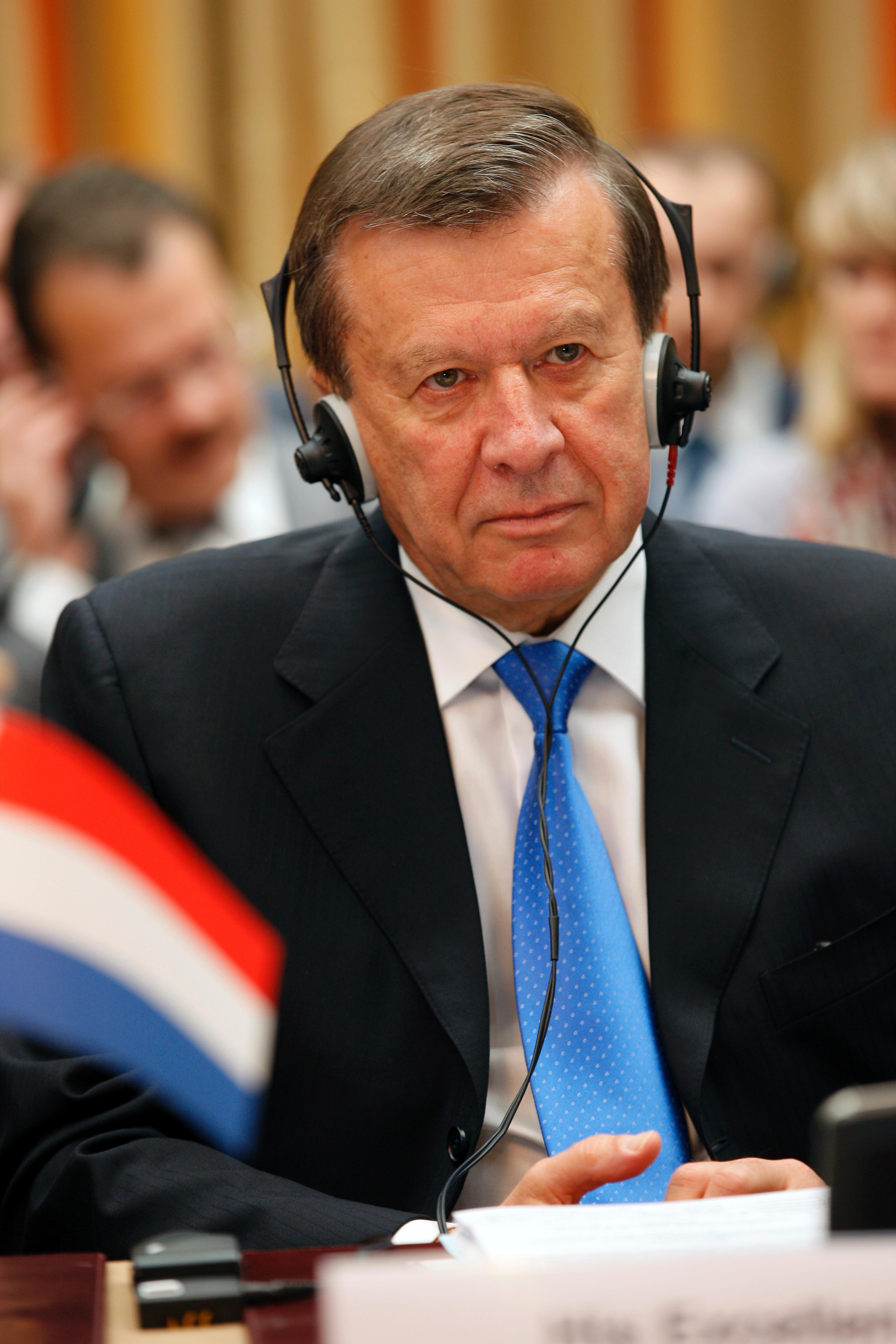
- Date formed: 14 September 2007
- Date dissolved: 8 May 2008

People and organisations
- Head of state: Vladimir Putin
- Head of government: Viktor Zubkov
- Deputy head of government: Sergei Ivanov; Dmitry Medvedev
- No. of ministers: 22
- Member party: United Russia
- Status in legislature: Majority
- Opposition party: Communist Party
- Opposition leader: Gennady Zyuganov

History
- Predecessor: Fradkov II
- Successor: Putin II

The article includes information on the composition of the Russian government headed by Viktor Zubkov, which functioned from 17 September 2007 to 8 May 2008.

== Ministers ==
Minister	Period of office
Prime Minister; Viktor Zubkov	September 14, 2007 - May 8, 2008
First Deputy Prime Minister; Sergei Ivanov	September 14, 2007 - May 8, 2008
First Deputy Prime Minister; Dmitry Medvedev	September 14, 2007 - May 8, 2008
Deputy Prime Minister; Alexander Zhukov	September 14, 2007 - May 8, 2008
Deputy Prime Minister; Alexei Kudrin	September 14, 2007 - May 8, 2008
Deputy Prime Minister; Sergei Naryshkin	September 14, 2007 - May 8, 2008
Minister of the Interior; Rashid Nurgaliyev	September 14, 2007 - May 8, 2008
Minister of Emergency Situations; Sergei Shoigu	September 14, 2007 - May 8, 2008
Minister of Health and Welfare Development; Tatyana Golikova	September 14, 2007 - May 8, 2008
Minister of External Affairs; Sergey Lavrov	September 14, 2007 - May 8, 2008
Minister of Information Technologies and Telecommunications; Leonid Reiman	September 14, 2007 - May 8, 2008
Minister of Culture and Mass Media; Aleksandr Sokolov	September 14, 2007 - May 8, 2008
Minister of Defence; Anatoly Serdyukov	September 14, 2007 - May 8, 2008
Minister of Education and Science; Andrei Fursenko	September 14, 2007 - May 8, 2008
Minister of Natural Resources; Yury Trutnev	September 14, 2007 - May 8, 2008
Minister of Regional Development; Dmitry Kozak	September 14, 2007 - May 8, 2008
Minister of Agriculture and Fishing; Alexey Gordeyev	September 14, 2007 - May 8, 2008
Minister of Industry and Energy; Viktor Khristenko	September 14, 2007 - May 8, 2008
Minister of Transport; Igor Levitin	September 14, 2007 - May 8, 2008
Minister of Finance; Alexey Kudrin	September 14, 2007 - May 8, 2008
Minister of Economic Development and Trade; Elvira Nabiullina	September 14, 2007 - May 8, 2008
Minister of Energy; Sergei Shmatko	September 14, 2007 - May 8, 2008
Minister of Justice; Vladimir Ustinov	September 14, 2007 - May 8, 2008
Minister, Chief of Staff of the Government; Vladislav Putilin	September 14, 2007 - May 8, 2008
