= Mikhail Fradkov's Second Cabinet =

Second cabinet of Mikhail Fradkov
- 51st Cabinet of Russia

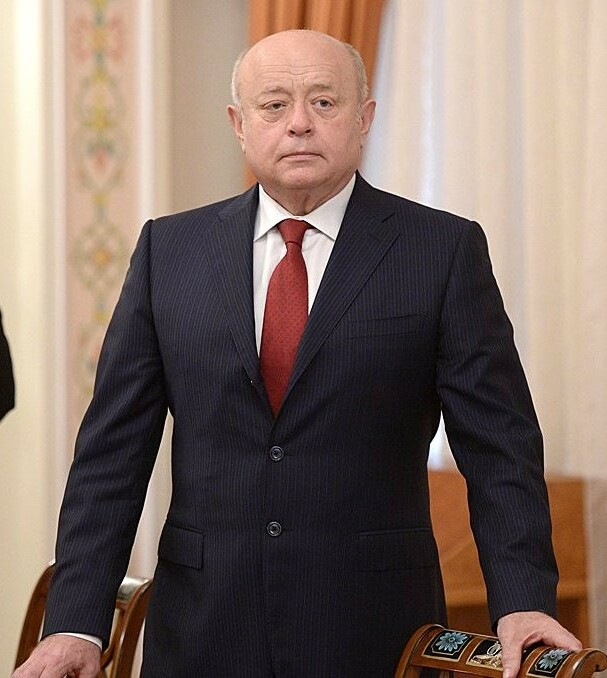
- Date formed: 12 May 2004
- Date dissolved: 13 September 2007

People and organisations
- Head of state: Vladimir Putin
- Head of government: Mikhail Fradkov
- Deputy head of government: Sergei Ivanov; Dmitry Medvedev
- No. of ministers: 22
- Member party: United Russia
- Status in legislature: Majority
- Opposition party: Communist Party
- Opposition leader: Gennady Zyuganov

History
- Predecessor: Fradkov I
- Successor: Zubkov

Mikhail Fradkov's Second Cabinet (May 2004 - September 2007) was the twelfth cabinet of the government of the Russian Federation, preceded by Fradkov's First Cabinet, which followed the cabinet led by Mikhail Kasyanov, who had been dismissed by President Vladimir Putin on February 24, 2004 shortly before the presidential election. It was led by Prime Minister Fradkov, proposed by President Putin for the approval by the State Duma on May 7, 2004, the day Putin entered into his second presidential term. On May 12 Fradkov was approved by the State Duma and appointed Prime Minister by the President. The other 17 ministers of the cabinet were appointed by presidential decrees on May 20, 2004. The prime minister and 16 ministers occupied the same positions in Fradkov's First Cabinet. Only Leonid Reiman assumed the reestablished position of Information Technologies and Telecommunications Minister of Russia. Eight of the ministers took part in Kasyanov's Cabinet, all on the same positions: Yury Chaika, Alexey Gordeyev, German Gref, Sergei Ivanov, Viktor Khristenko, Alexey Kudrin, Leonid Reiman, and Sergei Shoigu.

== Further development ==
- September 13, 2004:

The Ministry of Regional Development was reestablished. Vladimir Yakovlev was fired from the position of Presidential Plenipotentiary Envoy to the Southern Federal District in the aftermath of the Beslan school hostage crisis and was appointed Minister of Regional Development by the President.

Dmitry Kozak was replaced by the President with Sergei Naryshkin as Minister – Chief of Staff of the Government and became Presidential Plenipotentiary Envoy to the Southern Federal District instead of Yakovlev.

- November 14, 2005:

Two more Deputy Prime Minister positions were created. Dmitry Medvedev was appointed First Deputy Prime Minister, Sergei Ivanov was appointed Deputy Prime Minister by the President, retaining his Defence Minister position.

- June 23, 2006:

President Vladimir Putin replaced Yury Chaika with former Prosecutor General Vladimir Ustinov as Justice Minister of Russia. Chaika in turn assumed the Prosecutor General position for the second time in his career.

- February 15, 2007:

The President introduced the second position of First Deputy Prime Minister assumed by Sergei Ivanov and appointed Sergei Naryshkin Deputy Prime Minister. Former Chief of the Federal Tax Service of Russia Anatoly Serdyukov was appointed Defence Minister instead of Ivanov. Naryshkin retained his position of Chief of Staff of the Government.

- September 12, 2007:

President Putin accepted the resignation of Prime Minister Mikhail Fradkov. According to Russian legislation, his cabinet was also dismissed. Fradkov, however, remained acting Prime Minister until September 14, when the new Prime Minister, Viktor Zubkov, was appointed. German Gref, Vladimir Yakovlev and Mikhail Zurabov were dismissed on September 24, when the new cabinet was formed.

== Ministers ==
Minister	Period of office
Prime Minister; Mikhail Fradkov	May 12, 2004 - September 14, 2007
First Deputy Prime Minister; Dmitry Medvedev	November 14, 2005 - September 24, 2007
First Deputy Prime Minister; Sergei Ivanov	February 15, 2007 - September 24, 2007
Deputy Prime Minister; Alexander Zhukov	May 20, 2004 - September 24, 2007
Deputy Prime Minister; Sergei Ivanov	November 14, 2005 – February 15, 2007
Sergei Naryshkin	February 15, 2007 - September 24, 2007
Minister of the Interior; Rashid Nurgaliyev	May 20, 2004 - September 24, 2007
Minister of Emergency Situations; Sergei Shoigu	May 20, 2004 - September 24, 2007
Minister of Health and Welfare Development; Mikhail Zurabov	May 20, 2004 - September 24, 2007
Minister of External Affairs; Sergey Lavrov	May 20, 2004 - September 24, 2007
Minister of Information Technologies and Telecommunications; Leonid Reiman	May 20, 2004 - September 24, 2007
Minister of Culture and Mass Media; Aleksandr Sokolov	May 20, 2004 - September 24, 2007
Minister of Defence; Sergei Ivanov	May 20, 2004 – February 15, 2007
Anatoly Serdyukov	February 15, 2007 - September 24, 2007
Minister of Education and Science; Andrei Fursenko	May 20, 2004 - September 24, 2007
Minister of Natural Resources; Yury Trutnev	May 20, 2004 - September 24, 2007
Minister of Regional Development; Vladimir Yakovlev	September 13, 2004 - September 24, 2007
Minister of Agriculture and Fishing; Alexey Gordeyev	May 20, 2004 - September 24, 2007
Minister of Industry and Energy; Viktor Khristenko	May 20, 2004 - September 24, 2007
Minister of Transport; Igor Levitin	May 20, 2004 - September 24, 2007
Minister of Finance; Alexey Kudrin	May 20, 2004 - September 24, 2007
Minister of Economic Development and Trade; German Gref	May 20, 2004 - September 24, 2007
Minister of Justice; Yury Chaika	May 20, 2004 – June 23, 2006
Vladimir Ustinov	June 23, 2006 - September 24, 2007
Minister, Chief of Staff of the Government; Dmitry Kozak	May 20, 2004 – September 13, 2004
Sergei Naryshkin	September 13, 2004 - September 24, 2007
