= Dmitry Medvedev's Cabinet =

Dmitry Medvedev's Cabinet may refer to:

- Dmitry Medvedev's First Cabinet, the Russian government led by Dmitry Medvedev from 2012 to 2018
- Dmitry Medvedev's Second Cabinet, the Russian government led by Dmitry Medvedev from 2018 to 2020
