= Vladimir Putin's Second Cabinet =

Russian government cabinet

Second cabinet of Vladimir Putin
- 53rd Cabinet of Russia

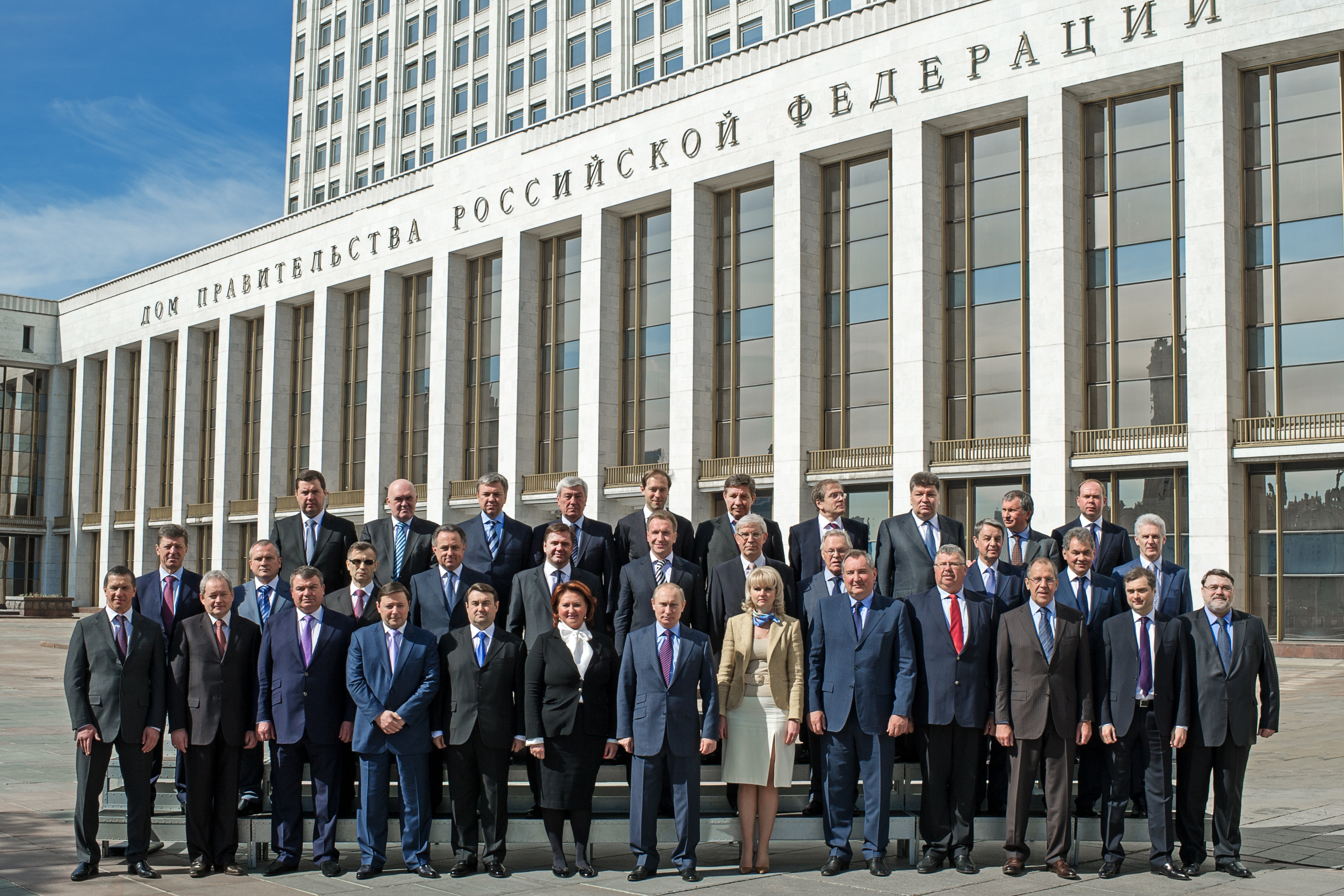
- Date formed: 8 May 2008
- Date dissolved: 7 May 2012

People and organisations
- Head of state: Dmitry Medvedev
- Head of government: Vladimir Putin; Viktor Zubkov (acting)
- Head of government's history: 1999–present
- Deputy head of government: Viktor Zubkov
- No. of ministers: 26
- Member party: United Russia
- Status in legislature: Majority
- Opposition party: Communist Party
- Opposition leader: Gennady Zyuganov

History
- Predecessor: Zubkov
- Successor: Medvedev I

Vladimir Putin's Second Cabinet (May 2008 – May 2012) was a cabinet of the government of the Russian Federation following the 2008 Russian presidential election that resulted in the election of Dmitry Medvedev as the third President of Russia. The second President, Vladimir Putin, was appointed to the position of the Prime Minister of Russia. The cabinet followed Viktor Zubkov's Cabinet.

In the new cabinet the number of Deputy Prime Ministers increased from five to seven. Viktor Zubkov (former Prime Minister) and Igor Shuvalov were appointed First Deputy Prime Ministers, while Igor Sechin, Sergey Sobyanin, Alexander Zhukov, Sergei Ivanov and Alexei Kudrin received positions of Deputy Prime Ministers. Igor Sechin, former Deputy Chief of the Presidential Administration of Russia is responsible for the industry; Alexei Kudrin is responsible for the finances; and Alexander Zhukov is responsible for the National Priority Projects.

Aleksandr Konovalov, former presidential representative to the Volga Federal District and a student of Dmitry Medvedev became Minister for Justice.

Alexei Kudrin kept the position of the Minister of Finance. Rashid Nurgaliyev kept the position of the Minister of Internal Affairs. Sergey Lavrov kept the position of the Foreign Minister of Russia. Sergey Shoigu kept the position of the Minister for Emergency Situations. Anatoliy Serdyukov kept his position of the Defense Minister of Russia. Elvira Nabiullina kept her position as Minister for Economics and Trade. Igor Levitin kept his position as the Transport Minister.

Tatiana Golikova kept the position of the Minister of Health and Social Development. Her husband, Viktor Khristenko, received the position of Minister for Industry (before he was the Minister for Industry and Energy), while the former head of Atomstroyexport, Sergei Shmatko, became the Minister for Energy.

Alexey Gordeyev kept his position as Minister for Agriculture. Yuri Trutnev kept his position as Minister of Natural Resources. Dmitry Kozak kept his position as Regional Development Minister and Andrei Fursenko kept his position as Minister of Education and Science.

Minister for the Information and Mass Communications became Igor Shchyogolev. Aleksandr Avdeyev, former ambassador to France, became Minister for Culture.

There was created new Ministry for Sport, Tourism and Youth Policy headed by Vitaly Mutko, former President of Russian Football Union.

There was also created new Agency for Commonwealth of Independent States Affairs (Агентство по делам СНГ) but the head of it was not appointed yet (as of 29 May 2008). Moscow Mayor Yury Luzhkov rejected rumors that he is supposed to fill the vacation

== Ministers ==
Minister	Period of office
Prime Minister; Vladimir Putin	8 May 2008 – 8 May 2012
First Deputy Prime Minister; Viktor Zubkov	12 May 2008 – 21 May 2012
First Deputy Prime Minister; Igor Shuvalov	12 May 2008 – 21 May 2012
Deputy Prime Minister; Alexander Zhukov	12 May 2008 – 20 December 2011
Vladislav Surkov	27 December 2011 – 21 May 2012
Deputy Prime Minister; Sergei Ivanov	12 May 2008 – 22 December 2011
Dmitry Rogozin	22 December 2011 – 21 May 2012
Deputy Prime Minister; Igor Sechin	12 May 2008 – 21 May 2012
Deputy Prime Minister; Dmitry Kozak	14 October 2008 – 21 May 2012
Deputy Prime Minister; Alexander Khloponin	19 January 2010 – 21 May 2012
Deputy Prime Minister; Alexei Kudrin	12 May 2008 – 26 September 2011
Minister of the Interior; Rashid Nurgaliyev	12 May 2008 – 21 May 2012
Minister of Emergency Situations; Sergei Shoigu	12 May 2008 – 21 May 2012
Minister of Health and Welfare Development; Tatyana Golikova	12 May 2008 – 21 May 2012
Minister of Foreign Affairs; Sergey Lavrov	9 March 2004 – 21 May 2012
Minister of Information Technologies and Telecommunications; Igor Shchyogolev	12 May 2008 – 21 May 2012
Minister of Culture and Mass Media; Aleksandr Avdeyev	12 May 2008 – 21 May 2012
Minister of Defence; Anatoly Serdyukov	12 May 2008 – 21 May 2012
Minister of Education and Science; Andrei Fursenko	12 May 2008 – 21 May 2012
Minister of Natural Resources; Yury Trutnev	12 May 2008 – 21 May 2012
Minister of Regional Development; Dmitry Kozak	12 May 2008 – 14 October 2008
Viktor Basargin	14 October 2008 – 21 May 2012
Minister of Agriculture and Fishing; Alexey Gordeyev	12 May 2008 – 12 March 2009
Yelena Skrynnik	12 March 2009 – 21 May 2012
Minister of Industry and Energy; Viktor Khristenko	12 May 2008 – 31 January 2012
Denis Manturov	1 February 2012 – 21 May 2012
Minister of Transport; Igor Levitin	12 May 2008 – 21 May 2012
Minister of Finance; Alexey Kudrin	12 May 2008 – 26 September 2011
Anton Siluanov	16 December 2011 – 21 May 2012
Minister of Economic Development and Trade; Elvira Nabiullina	12 May 2008 – 21 May 2012
Minister of Energy; Sergei Shmatko	12 May 2008 – 21 May 2012
Minister of Justice; Aleksandr Konovalov	12 May 2008 – 21 May 2012
Minister of Sport, Tourism and Youth policy Vitaly Mutko	12 May 2008 – 21 May 2012
Minister, Chief of Staff of the Government; Sergey Sobyanin	12 May 2008 – 21 October 2010
Vyacheslav Volodin	21 October 2010 – 27 December 2011
Anton Vaino	27 December 2011 – 21 May 2012
