= Vladimir Putin's First Cabinet =

Russian government cabinet

First cabinet of Vladimir Putin
- 48th Cabinet of Russia

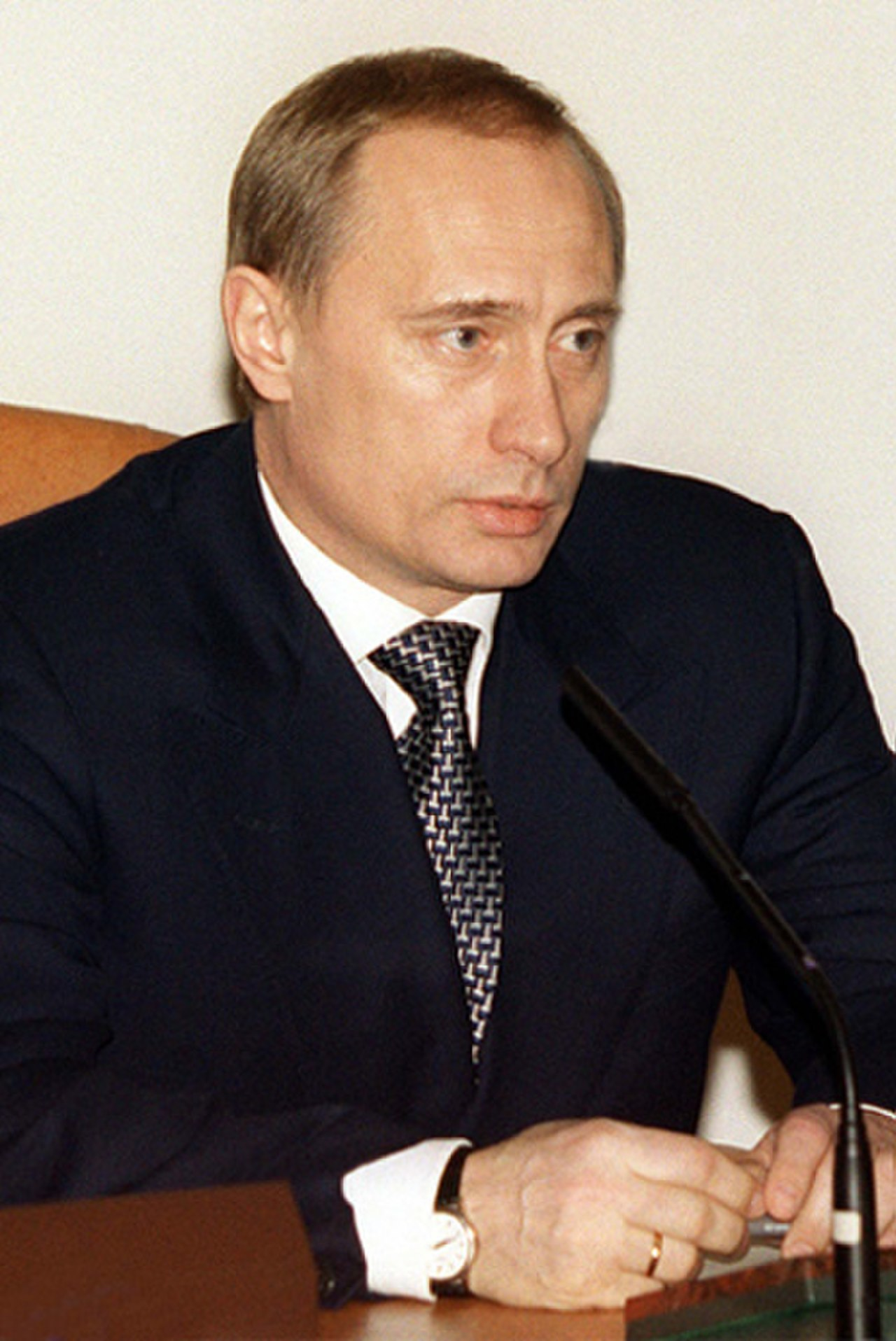
- Date formed: 16 August 1999
- Date dissolved: 7 May 2000

People and organisations
- Head of state: Boris Yeltsin; Vladimir Putin (Acting)
- Head of government: Vladimir Putin; Mikhail Kasyanov (Acting)
- Head of government's history: 1999–present
- Deputy head of government: Mikhail Kasyanov; Nikolay Aksyonenko; Viktor Khristenko
- No. of ministers: 16
- Member party: Unity; Our Home - Russia; Democratic Choice of Russia
- Status in legislature: Coalition
- Opposition party: Communist Party
- Opposition leader: Gennady Zyuganov

History
- Predecessor: Stepashin
- Successor: Kasyanov

This article contains information about the First Cabinet of Vladimir Putin, in effect from 16 August 1999 to 7 May 2000. It was followed by Mikhail Kasyanov's Cabinet.

== Ministers ==
Office	Minister	Period of office
Prime Minister	Vladimir Putin	August 16, 1999 – May 7, 2000
First Deputy Prime Minister	Mikhail Kasyanov	January 10, 2000 – May 7, 2000
First Deputy Prime Minister	Nikolay Aksyonenko	August 19, 1999 – January 10, 2000
First Deputy Prime Minister	Viktor Khristenko	August 19, 1999 – January 10, 2000
Deputy Prime Minister	Ilya Klebanov	August 16, 1999 – May 7, 2000
Deputy Prime Minister	Valentina Matvienko	August 16, 1999 – May 7, 2000
Deputy Prime Minister	Vladimir Sherback	August 19, 1999 – May 7, 2000
Deputy Prime Minister	Nikolai Koshman	October 15, 1999 – May 7, 2000
Deputy Prime Minister	Sergey Shoygu	January 10, 2000 – May 7, 2000
Deputy Prime Minister	Viktor Khristenko	January 10, 2000 – May 7, 2000
Minister of Finance	Mikhail Kasyanov	August 16, 1999 – May 7, 2000
Minister of Atomic Energy	Yevgeny Adamov	August 16, 1999 – May 7, 2000
Minister of Agriculture	Alexey Gordeyev	August 16, 1999 – May 7, 2000
Minister for Antimonopoly Policy and Support of Entrepreneurship	Ilya Yuzhanov	August 16, 1999 – May 7, 2000
Minister of Fuel and Energy	Viktor Kalyuzhny	August 19, 1999 – May 7, 2000
Minister of the Interior	Vladimir Rushaylo	August 16, 1999 – May 7, 2000
Minister of Emergency Situations	Sergei Shoigu	August 16, 1999 – May 7, 2000
Minister of Mass Media	Mikhail Lesin	August 16, 1999 – May 7, 2000
Minister of Federal, Ethnic and Migration Policy	Vyacheslav Mikhailov	August 19, 1999 – January 6, 2000
Minister of Federal, Ethnic and Migration Policy	Alexander Blokhin	January 6, 2000 – May 7, 2000
Minister of Health	Yuri Shevchenko	August 16, 1999 – May 7, 2000
Minister of Property Relations	Farit Gazizullin	August 16, 1999 – May 7, 2000
Minister of Foreign Affairs	Igor Ivanov	August 16, 1999 – May 7, 2000
Minister of Culture	Vladimir Yegorov	August 19, 1999 – February 8, 2000
Minister of Culture	Mikhail Shvydkoy	February 8, 2000 – May 7, 2000
Minister of Taxes	Alexander Pochinok	August 16, 1999 – May 7, 2000
Minister of Defence	Igor Sergeev	August 16, 1999 – May 7, 2000
Minister of Education	Vladimir Filippov	August 16, 1999 – May 7, 2000
Minister of Natural Resources	Boris Yatskevich	August 16, 1999 – May 7, 2000
Minister of Industry, Science and Technologies	Mikhail Kirpichnikov	August 19, 1999 – May 7, 2000
Minister of Railways	Vladimir Starostenko	August 19, 1999 – September 16, 1999
Minister of Railways	Nikolay Aksyonenko	September 16, 1999 – May 7, 2000
Minister of Telecommunications and Informatization	Leonid Reiman	November 12, 1999 – May 7, 2000
Minister of Transport	Sergey Frank	August 16, 1999 – May 7, 2000
Minister of Labor and Welfare Development	Sergei Kalashnikov	August 19, 1999 – May 7, 2000
Minister of Economy	Andrei Shapovalyants	August 19, 1999 – May 7, 2000
Minister of Trade	Mikhail Fradkov	August 19, 1999 – May 7, 2000
Minister of Justice	Yury Chaika	August 16, 1999 – May 7, 2000
Minister – Chief of Staff of the Government	Dmitry Kozak	August 19, 1999 – May 7, 2000
Minister of Sports, Physical Culture and Tourism	Boris Ivanyuzhenkov	August 19, 1999 – May 7, 2000
Minister for Commonwealth of Independent States	Leonid Drachevsky	August 19, 1999 – May 7, 2000
