= Mikhail Kasyanov's Cabinet =

Cabinet of Mikhail Kasyanov
- 49th Cabinet of Russia

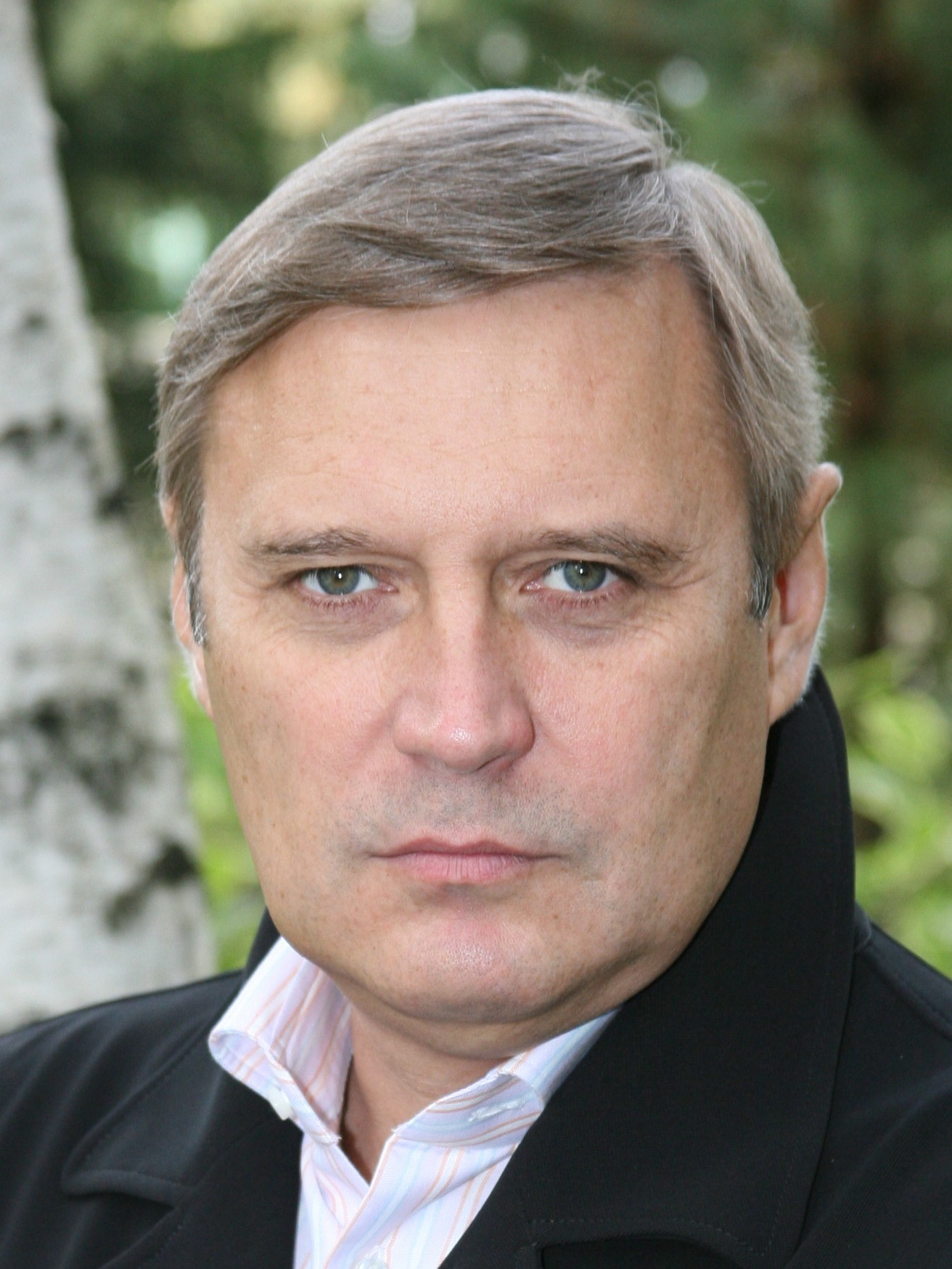
- Date formed: 17 May 2000
- Date dissolved: 24 February 2004

People and organisations
- Head of state: Vladimir Putin
- Head of government: Mikhail Kasyanov; Viktor Khristenko (acting)
- Deputy head of government: Viktor Khristenko
- No. of ministers: 16
- Member party: Unity, Our Home – Russia and Fatherland – All Russia → United Russia; Agrarian Party
- Status in legislature: Coalition
- Opposition party: Communist Party
- Opposition leader: Gennady Zyuganov

History
- Predecessor: Putin I
- Successor: Fradkov I

Mikhail Kasyanov's Cabinet (May 2000 - March 2004) was a cabinet of the government of the Russian Federation during most of Vladimir Putin's first presidential term. It followed Vladimir Putin's Cabinet after Vladimir Putin became President of Russia and was replaced with Mikhail Fradkov's First Cabinet shortly before the presidential election of 2004. It was led by Prime Minister Mikhail Kasyanov, proposed by President Vladimir Putin after his inauguration on May 7 and approved by the State Duma and appointed Prime Minister by the President on May 17, 2000. Prior to this, Kasyanov was the Finance Minister in Vladimir Putin's Cabinet, and as Putin was promoted to acting president on December 31, 1999, de facto had led his cabinet since January 10, when he was appointed also First Deputy Prime Minister. Other 28 ministers were appointed by the President on May 18–20. Only six of them were new to the government: Gennady Bukaev, Aleksandr Dondukov, Aleksandr Gavrin, German Gref, Alexey Kudrin and Igor Shuvalov.

It was the last coalition Cabinet until 2024.

== Further development ==
On November 28, 2000, the position of Minister for Coordination of the Development of the Chechen Republic was established and occupied by Vladimir Yelagin.

On February 5, 2001, Aleksandr Gavrin was dismissed as Minister of Energy.

On March 28, 2001, Igor Sergeyev was replaced with Sergei Ivanov as Defence Minister, Vladimir Rushaylo with Boris Gryzlov as Interior Minister, and Yevgeny Adamov with Alexander Rumyantsev as Minister for Atomic Energy.

On June 16, 2001, Boris Yatskevich was replaced with Vitaly Artyukhov as Minister of Natural Resources. Igor Yusufov was appointed Minister of Energy.

On October 16, 2001, Ministry for Federal, Ethnic and Migration Policy was abolished and the position of Minister of Industry, Science and Technologies was promoted to the rank of a Deputy Prime Minister. Accordingly, on October 17 Alexander Blokhin and Aleksandr Dondukov were dismissed, Ilya Klebanov was appointed Deputy Prime Minister and Minister of Industry, Science and Technologies. The position of Minister of the Russian Federation was established to coordinate ethnic policy, and on December 6 Vladimir Zorin assumed this position.

On January 3, 2002, Nikolay Aksyonenko was sacked as Minister of Railways and on January 4 was replaced with Gennady Fadeyev.

On February 18, Ilya Klebanov lost his position of a Deputy Prime Minister, but remained the Minister of Industry, Science and Technologies.

On November 6, Vladimir Yelagin was replaced with Stanislav Ilyasov as Minister for Coordination of the Development of the Chechen Republic.

On March 11, 2003, Valentina Matviyenko was dismissed from her position of a Deputy Prime Minister for Welfare as she became the Presidential Plenipotentiary Envoy to the Northwestern Federal District.

On April 24 Boris Alyoshin was appointed Deputy Prime Minister for Industry and Galina Karelova Deputy Prime Minister for Welfare.

On May 28 Igor Shuvalov was replaced with Konstantin Merzlikin as Minister, Chief of Staff of the Government.

On June 16, a position of Deputy Prime Minister for Housing was established and assumed by Vladimir Yakovlev, who had just resigned as Governor of Saint Petersburg.

On September 22, Minister of Railways Gennady Fadeyev resigned and became President of JSC Russian Railways. On October 9 Vadim Morozov became Minister of Railways.

On November 1, Ilya Klebanov resigned as Minister of Industry, Science and Technologies and was appointed Presidential Plenipotentiary Envoy to the Northwestern Federal District, replacing Valentina Matviyenko, who had been elected Governor of Saint Petersburg.

On November 6, his First Deputy Andrey Fursenko was appointed acting Minister of Industry, Science and Technologies.

On December 29, Boris Gryzlov, who had been elected to the State Duma, was dismissed as Interior Minister and replaced with Rashid Nurgaliyev as acting Minister.

Mikhail Kasyanov was sacked from his position by President Vladimir Putin on February 24, 2004, and was replaced with his Deputy Viktor Khristenko as acting Prime Minister. Other ministers remained acting until Mikhail Fradkov's First Cabinet was formed.

== Ministers ==
| Portfolio | Minister | Took office | Left office | Party |
|---|---|---|---|---|
| Prime Minister | Mikhail Kasyanov | 17 May 2000 | 24 February 2004 | Independent |
| Prime Minister | Viktor Khristenko (acting) | 24 February 2004 | 5 March 2004 | Independent |
| Deputy Prime Minister | Viktor Khristenko | 19 May 2000 | 5 March 2004 | Independent |
| Deputy Prime Minister | Ilya Klebanov | 19 May 2000 | 18 February 2002 | Independent |
| Deputy Prime Minister | Boris Alyoshin | 24 April 2003 | 5 March 2004 | Independent |
| Deputy Prime Minister | Valentina Matvienko | 19 May 2000 | 11 March 2003 | United Russia |
| Deputy Prime Minister | Galina Karelova | 24 April 2003 | 5 March 2004 | United Russia |
| Deputy Prime Minister, Minister of Agriculture | Alexey Gordeyev | 19 May 2000 | 5 March 2004 | APR |
| Deputy Prime Minister, Minister of Finance | Alexey Kudrin | 19 May 2000 | 5 March 2004 | Independent |
| Deputy Prime Minister | Vladimir Yakovlev | 16 June 2003 | 5 March 2004 | United Russia |
| Minister for Antimonopoly Policy and Support of Entrepreneurship | Ilya Yuzhanov | 19 May 2000 | 5 March 2004 | Union of Right Forces |
| Minister of Atomic Energy | Yevgeny Adamov | 19 May 2000 | 28 March 2001 | Independent |
| Minister of Atomic Energy | Alexander Rumyantsev | 28 March 2001 | 5 March 2004 | Independent |
| Minister of Culture | Mikhail Shvydkoy | 19 May 2000 | 5 March 2004 | Independent |
| Minister of Defence | Igor Sergeyev | 19 May 2000 | 28 March 2001 | Independent |
| Minister of Defence | Sergei Ivanov | 28 March 2001 | 5 March 2004 | United Russia |
| Minister of Economic Development and Trade | German Gref | 19 May 2000 | 5 March 2004 | Independent |
| Minister of Education | Vladimir Filippov | 19 May 2000 | 5 March 2004 | Independent |
| Minister of Emergency Situations | Sergei Shoigu | 19 May 2000 | 5 March 2004 | United Russia |
| Minister of Energy | Aleksandr Gavrin | 19 May 2000 | 5 February 2001 | United Russia |
| Minister of Energy | Igor Yusufov | 16 June 2001 | 5 March 2004 | Independent |
| Minister of Federal, Ethnic and Migration Policy | Alexander Blokhin | 19 May 2000 | 16 October 2001 | Independent |
| Minister of the Russian Federation for Ethnic Policy | Vladimir Zorin | 6 December 2001 | 5 March 2004 | United Russia |
| Minister of Foreign Affairs | Igor Ivanov | 19 May 2000 | 5 March 2004 | Independent |
| Minister of Health | Yuri Shevchenko | 19 May 2000 | 5 March 2004 | Independent |
| Minister of Industry, Science and Technologies | Aleksandr Dondukov | 19 May 2000 | 16 October 2001 | United Russia |
| Minister of Industry, Science and Technologies | Ilya Klebanov | 16 October 2001 | 1 November 2003 | Independent |
| Minister of Industry, Science and Technologies | Andrey Fursenko (acting) | 6 December 2003 | 5 March 2004 | Independent |
| Minister of the Interior | Vladimir Rushaylo | 19 May 2000 | 28 March 2001 | Independent |
| Minister of the Interior | Boris Gryzlov | 28 March 2001 | 29 December 2003 | United Russia |
| Minister of the Interior | Rashid Nurgaliyev (acting) | 29 December 2003 | 5 March 2004 | Independent |
| Minister of Justice | Yury Chaika | 19 May 2000 | 5 March 2004 | Independent |
| Minister of Labor and Welfare Development | Alexander Pochinok | 19 May 2000 | 5 March 2004 | Union of Right Forces |
| Minister of Mass Media | Mikhail Lesin | 19 May 2000 | 5 March 2004 | Independent |
| Minister of Natural Resources | Boris Yatskevich | 19 May 2000 | 16 June 2001 | Independent |
| Minister of Natural Resources | Vitaly Artyukhov | 16 June 2001 | 5 March 2004 | Independent |
| Minister of Property Relations | Farit Gazizullin | 19 May 2000 | 5 March 2004 | Independent |
| Minister of Railways | Nikolay Aksyonenko | 19 May 2000 | 3 January 2002 | Independent |
| Minister of Railways | Gennady Fadeyev | 4 January 2002 | 22 September 2003 | Independent |
| Minister of Taxes | Gennady Bukaev | 19 May 2000 | 5 March 2004 | Independent |
| Minister of Telecommunications and Informatization | Leonid Reiman | 19 May 2000 | 5 March 2004 | Independent |
| Minister of Transport | Sergey Frank (Note: Sergei Frank (Russian: Сергей Франк) was the supervisor at the OJSC Baltic Shipping Company (Russian: АООТ “Балтийское морское пароходство”), which was worth $2.5 billion, had 180 vessels, and was the largest shipping company in Russia when Baltic Shipping when bankrupt.) | 19 May 2000 | 5 March 2004 | Independent |
| Minister of the Russian Federation for the Chechen Republic | Vladimir Yelagin | 28 November 2000 | 6 November 2002 | Independent |
| Minister of the Russian Federation for the Chechen Republic | Stanislav Ilyasov | 6 November 2002 | 5 March 2004 | Independent |
| Chief of Staff of the Government | Igor Shuvalov | 19 May 2000 | 28 May 2003 | Independent |
| Chief of Staff of the Government | Konstantin Merzlikin | 28 May 2003 | 5 March 2004 | Independent |
