= Igor Levitin =

Russian politician

- Игорь Левитин
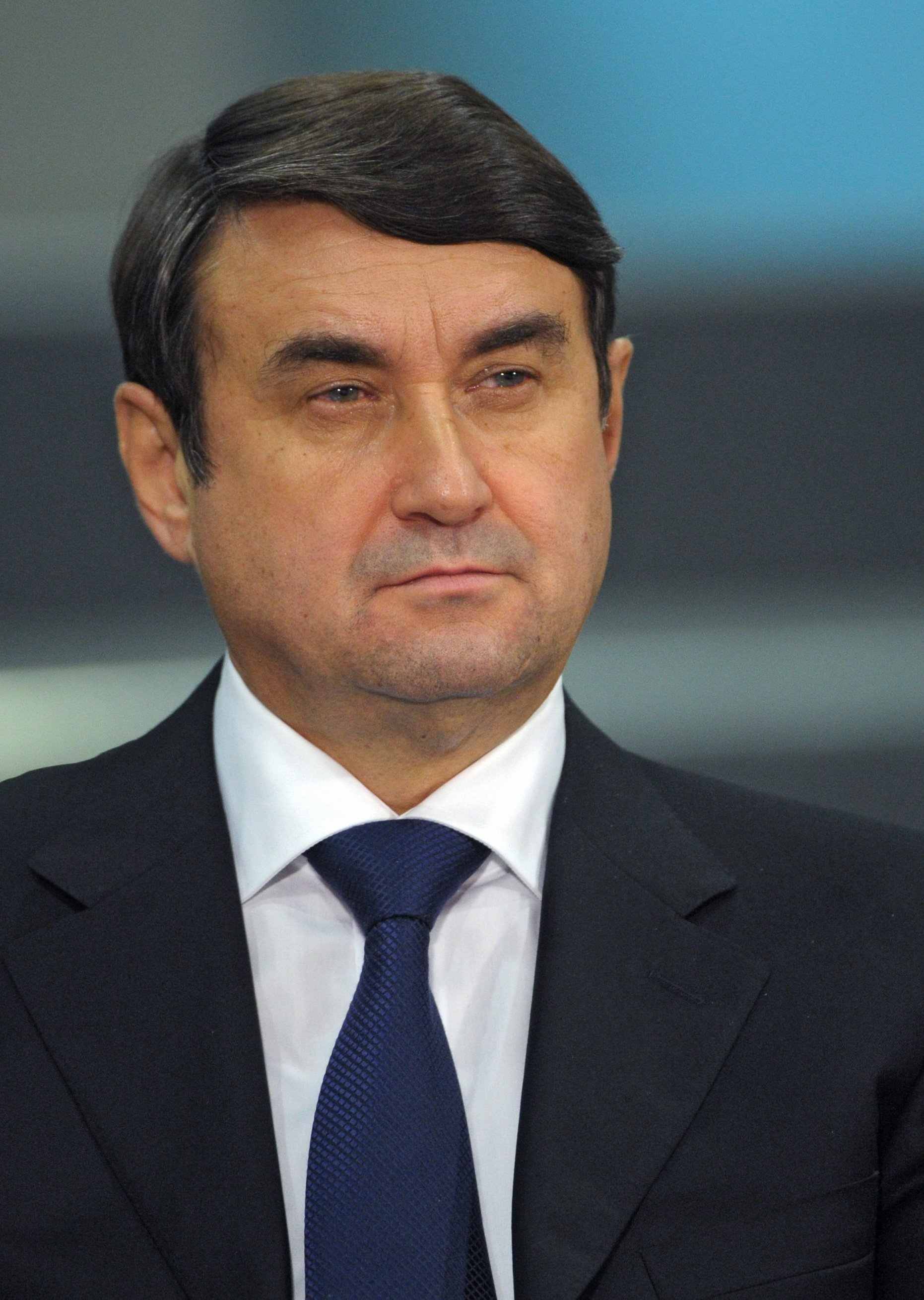
- Levitin in 2013

Aide to the President of Russia
- Incumbent
- Assumed office 2 September 2013
- President: Vladimir Putin

Secretary of the State Council
- In office 3 September 2012 – 29 May 2024
- President: Vladimir Putin
- Preceded by: Aleksandr Abramov
- Succeeded by: Aleksey Dyumin

Adviser to the President of Russia
- In office 22 May 2012 – 2 September 2013
- President: Vladimir Putin

Minister of Transport
- In office 9 March 2004 – 21 May 2012
- Prime Minister: Mikhail Fradkov; Viktor Zubkov; Vladimir Putin; Dmitry Medvedev
- Preceded by: Sergey Frank
- Succeeded by: Maksim Sokolov

Personal details
- Born: February 21, 1952 (age 74) Tsebrikovo, Odesa Oblast, Ukrainian SSR, Soviet Union
- Awards: Alt text

Igor Yevgenyevich Levitin (Russian: Игорь Евгеньевич Левитин; born 21 February 1952) is a Russian political figure, aide to the president of the Russian Federation since September 2013, and Class 1 active state advisor of the Russian Federation (2013). He previously served as the Minister of Transport of the Russian Federation (from 9 March 2004 until 21 May 2012). He is the chairman of the supervisory board of the Table Tennis Federation of Russia. He is also a member of the president advisory council at the International Table Tennis Federation (ITTF) and president of European Table Tennis Union until March 2022 when he stepped down temporarily due to the Russian invasion of Ukraine.

He has the federal state civilian service rank of 1st class Active State Councillor of the Russian Federation.

== Life and career ==
Levitin was born in the suburbs of Odesa to a Jewish family. In his early life, Levitin practiced table tennis at Odesa sports school for 10 years.

=== Military career ===
In 1970, at the age of 18, he was called up for mandatory military service in the Soviet Union. In 1973, he graduated from Mikhail Frunze Leningrad Command College of Railroad Troops and Military Communications. He began his service as Assistant Military Commandant in Odesa military command region at Transnistrian Railway. Between 1976 and 1980 he served in Southern Group of Soviet Armed Forces in Budapest. In 1983, he graduated from Military Academy of Rearward and Transportation having been trained as a railway engineer. From 1983 to 1985 he served as Military Commandant of a railway district and Urgal station at Baikal–Amur Mainline (BAM). He participated in the laying of the Golden Link. (Note: On September 29, 1984, the Alexander Bondar (Russian: Александр Бондарь) west crew and the Ivan Varshavsky (Russian: Иван Варшавский) east crew constructing the BAM met at Balbukta (Russian: Балбухта) and laid the Golden Link (Russian: «Золотое звено») which was not the intended meeting location of Kuanda (Russian: Куанда) which is 40 km west of Balbukta. On October 1, 1984, a formal ceremony at the Kuanda station was held for the joining of the east and west lines of BAM in which the workers replaced two links with two golden painted links. However, more rails were laid to complete the BAM in 1991 and the Baikal–Amur Mainline became operational later.) From 1985 to 1994 he served in the military communication bodies at Moscow railway as a railway district Military Commandant and later as a Deputy Head of Moscow Military Railway Communications Service. His rank is colonel in reserve.

=== Business career (1994-2004) ===
In 1994, Levitin changed his occupation to join Financial and Industrial Company of Railway Transport. where in 1995 he was appointed a vice president. In 1996, he joined Severstaltrans (a subsidiary of Severstal Group), which was founded as one of the first private competitors to Russian Railways. In the company, Levitin was responsible, among all, for transport machine building and railway transportation. After two years of service, he became Deputy Chief Executive Officer. During the same period, he was a member of the Public Council at the Government Commission of Russian Federation on the reform of railway transport. He was actively participating in research of cargo routing.

=== Career in the Russian government (2004-2012) ===
On March 9, 2004, Levitin was appointed Minister of Transport and Communications (Russian: Министр транспорта и связи) in Mikhail Fradkov's First Cabinet. In May 2004, the Ministry of Transport and Communications was split into two: Ministry of Transport (headed by Levitin) and Ministry of Information Technology and Telecommunication (headed by Leonid Reiman) during Fradkov's Second Cabinet. In Viktor Zubkov's government formed on September 14, 2007, Levitin remained in the same post. He continued his service as Minister of Transport in the next Cabinet (formed on May 12, 2008) under Vladimir Putin.

Upon assuming his office, Levitin reduced the central apparatus of the Ministry by over 20% following the decree on state personnel reduction issued by the state leadership. About two thousand officials were dismissed across regional and local bodies, while the Ministry apparatus faced a fourfold reduction.

On October 3, 2005 in Brussels, Levitin and EU Commissioner for Transport Jacques Barrot signed a joint agreement, which determined the general principles, goals, and structure of the Russia – EU dialogue in the area of transport and infrastructure. In early 2007, Levitin as chairman of an Intergovernmental Commission negotiated the cooperation with Latvia. As a result, in spring 2007 Russia and Latvia finally signed the border agreement, which had long been a controversial issue. In December 2007, Levitin and Foreign Minister of Lithuania Petras Vaitiekūnas signed an agreement on navigation in Curonian Lagoon as well as inland waterways of Kaliningrad Oblast. According to the document, authorisation-based rules for foreign navigation in the Russian waters were cancelled. The Russian ships received in these waters equal rights with the Lithuanian vessels.

In late October 2008, Levitin was elected chairman of the board of directors at Aeroflot, one of the biggest Russian carriers. He was also a member the Public Council at the Government Commission on the reform of railway transport.

Levitin was not part of Dmitry Medvedev's Cabinet formed on May 21, 2012.

=== Government career from 2012 to present ===
Between March and June 2012, he served as interim head of Maritime Collegium of the Russian Federation. From May 22, 2012 to September 2, 2013, he was advisor to the president of the Russian Federation Vladimir Putin. On 2 September 2013 he was appointed aide to the president. In August 2012, he became a member of the Presidential Council of the Russian Federation on the development of physical culture and sport. On 25 September 2013 he became deputy chairman of the Presidential Council of the Russian Federation on the development of physical culture and sport.

Following a decree (3 September 2012) by the administration of the president of Russian Federation, he was appointed Secretary of State Council of the Russian Federation. On October 17, 2013 Levitin became a member of Presidential Economic Council of the Russian Federation.

== Table tennis and Russian sports ==
Media have pointed out active development of table tennis in Russia since Levitin joined the Table Tennis Federation of Russia (TTFR). In particular, a lot of efforts have been focused on participation in the activities of the International and Continental Federations. As a result, in 2007 Russia hosted the Table Tennis World Cup in Saint Petersburg. In May 2014, he was elected vice president of the Russian Olympic Committee. In October 2014, Levitin became a member of Supervisory Council on hosting the 2018 Football World Cup. Upon Levitin’s initiative, since 2015 Russia has celebrated the World Table Tennis Day.

In 2006-08 Levitin was president of the Table Tennis Federation of Russia. In 2008 he became chair of the board of trustees of the TTFR. Levitin engaged Russia – on many occasions as a host country – in a number of competitions, including the ITTF World Tour since 2006; World Cup 2009; European Super Cup; European Championships (2008 and 2015); and World Team Cup. He prepared to host the 2017 European Under 21 Championship in Sochi. He also prepared the bid to host the 2020 World Team Cup in Yekaterinburg. With support of Levitin, table tennis centres have been created in several cities of Russia, including Moscow, Saint Petersburg, Yekaterinburg (Olympic training centre for Russian national teams and Tatiana Ferdman’s Table Tennis School), Kazan, Sorochinsk, Orenburg, and the Chuvash Republic. A number of ETTU and ITTF tennis tournaments were held there, and presently these centres serve as training platforms for the youth of the reserve national teams, and host get-togethers with foreign teams.

Levitin has drastically improved the funding of Russia’s national teams. Procedures of rehabilitation and training have been set, which involve high profile physicians, psychologists, massage therapists, and foreign specialists. Under Levitin, the board of trustees organises regular seminars and workshops for coaches and referees in various regions of Russia. Foreign speakers have often been invited, including Richard Prause, Ferenc Korsai, and Dubravko Skoric. With support of Levitin, Team Cup of Russia became one of the strongest competitions not only in Europe, but at the world level. Russian clubs are attended by Vladimir Samsonov (Belarus), Dimitrij Ovtcharov (Germany), and Jun Mizutani (Japan). With the support of the Referee Committee of the Federation, Levitin is improving the rules and the system of running the competition in table tennis.

He was president of European Table Tennis Union until March 2022, when he stepped down temporarily due to the Russian invasion of Ukraine.

In March 2023, Levitin expressed his confidence that temporarily suspended Russian athletes would be allowed to participate at the 2024 Summer Olympics in Paris.

== Personal life ==
Levitin is married to Nataliya Igorevna Levitina (Russian: Наталья Игоревна Левитина) (b. May 21, 1954) who is a housewife that oversees the Pan Press Publishing (Russian: «Пан-пресс»), a part of Dormashinvest (Russian: «Дормашинвест»).

His daughter Yulia Zvereva (Russian: Юлия Зверева) (b. May 15, 1975) works for Milikon service LLC (Russian: ООО «Миликон сервис») and Staltekhinvest LLC (Russian: ООО «Стальтехинвест»).

== Honours and awards ==
- Jubilee Medal "60 Years of the Armed Forces of the USSR" (1978)
- Order For Merit to the Fatherland 3rd class (15 February 2012)
- Order For Merit to the Fatherland 4th class (20 September 2009)
- Medal "For the Development of Railways" (9 January 2008)
- Order of Holy Prince Daniel of Moscow 1st class (22 February 2012)
- Order of Venerable Sergius of Radonezh 1st class (18 July 2014)
- Order of St. Alexander Nevsky II degree (2022)
