= Second Medvedev cabinet =

Composition of Russian government from 2018 to 2020

Second Cabinet of Dmitry Medvedev
- 55th Cabinet of Russia
- 2018–2020
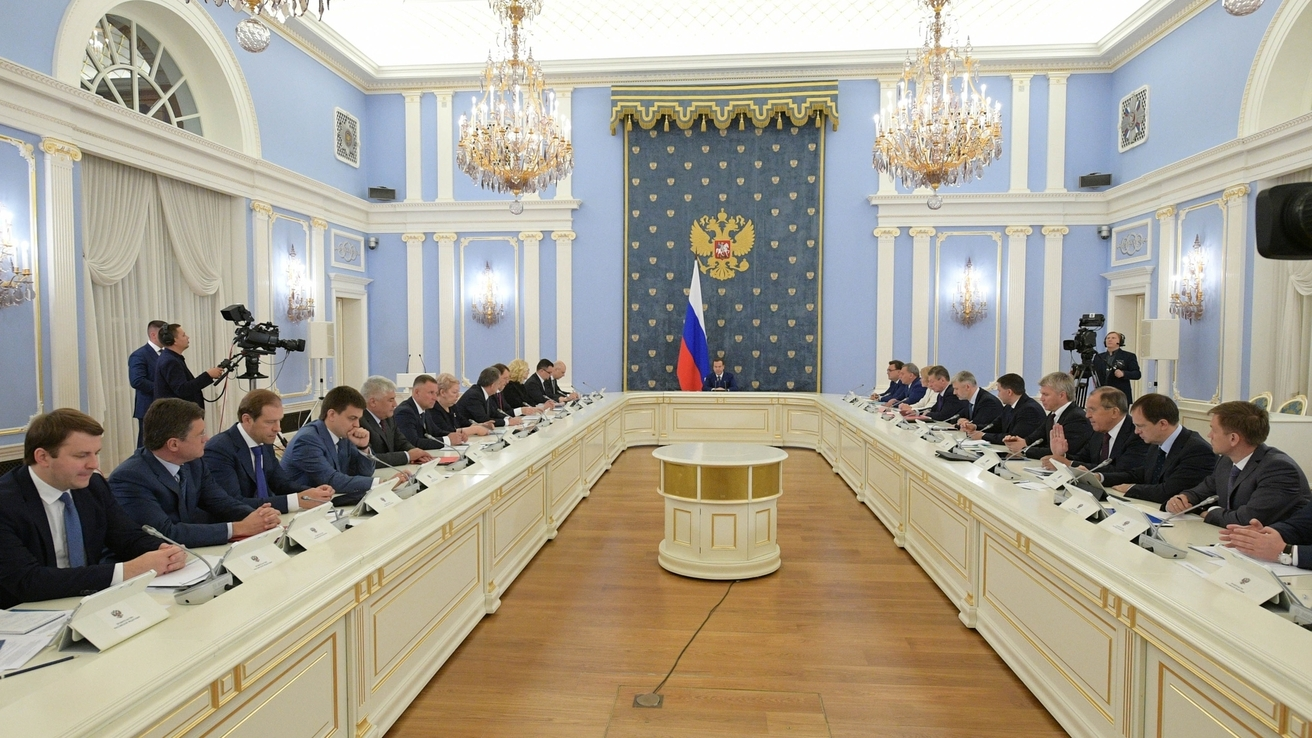
- Meeting of the Cabinet on 6 June 2018
- Date formed: 18 May 2018
- Date dissolved: 15 January 2020

People and organisations
- Head of state: Vladimir Putin
- Head of government: Dmitry Medvedev
- No. of ministers: 32
- Member party: United Russia; Independent
- Status in legislature: Majority with support from LDPR and Rodina
- Opposition parties: Communist Party; A Just Russia
- Opposition leaders: Gennady Zyuganov; Sergey Mironov

History
- Predecessor: Medvedev I
- Successor: Mishustin I

Dmitry Medvedev's Second Cabinet was the composition of the Russian government from 18 May 2018 to 15 January 2020 under the leadership of Prime Minister Dmitry Medvedev.

The Cabinet resigned on 15 January 2020, in response to significant constitutional changes suggested by Vladimir Putin regarding shifting power away from the presidency. However on Putin's instructions the Cabinet continued its work as a caretaker cabinet.

== Formation ==
The government began to form after Vladimir Putin's inauguration on 7 May 2018, when Putin nominated Medvedev as Prime Minister. On the same day, United Russia decided to support Medvedev. Since United Russia had more than half of the seats in the State Duma, this means Medvedev would become Prime Minister even if all other parties opposed him. On 8 May, the Liberal Democratic Party also expressed support for Dmitry Medvedev and nominated six candidates for Ministerial posts. On the same day, after a meeting with Dmitry Medvedev, the Communist Party and A Just Russia refused to support Medvedev.

For the first time since 1991 candidates for Deputy Prime Ministers were nominated before the hearings in the State Duma.

=== State Duma confirmation ===
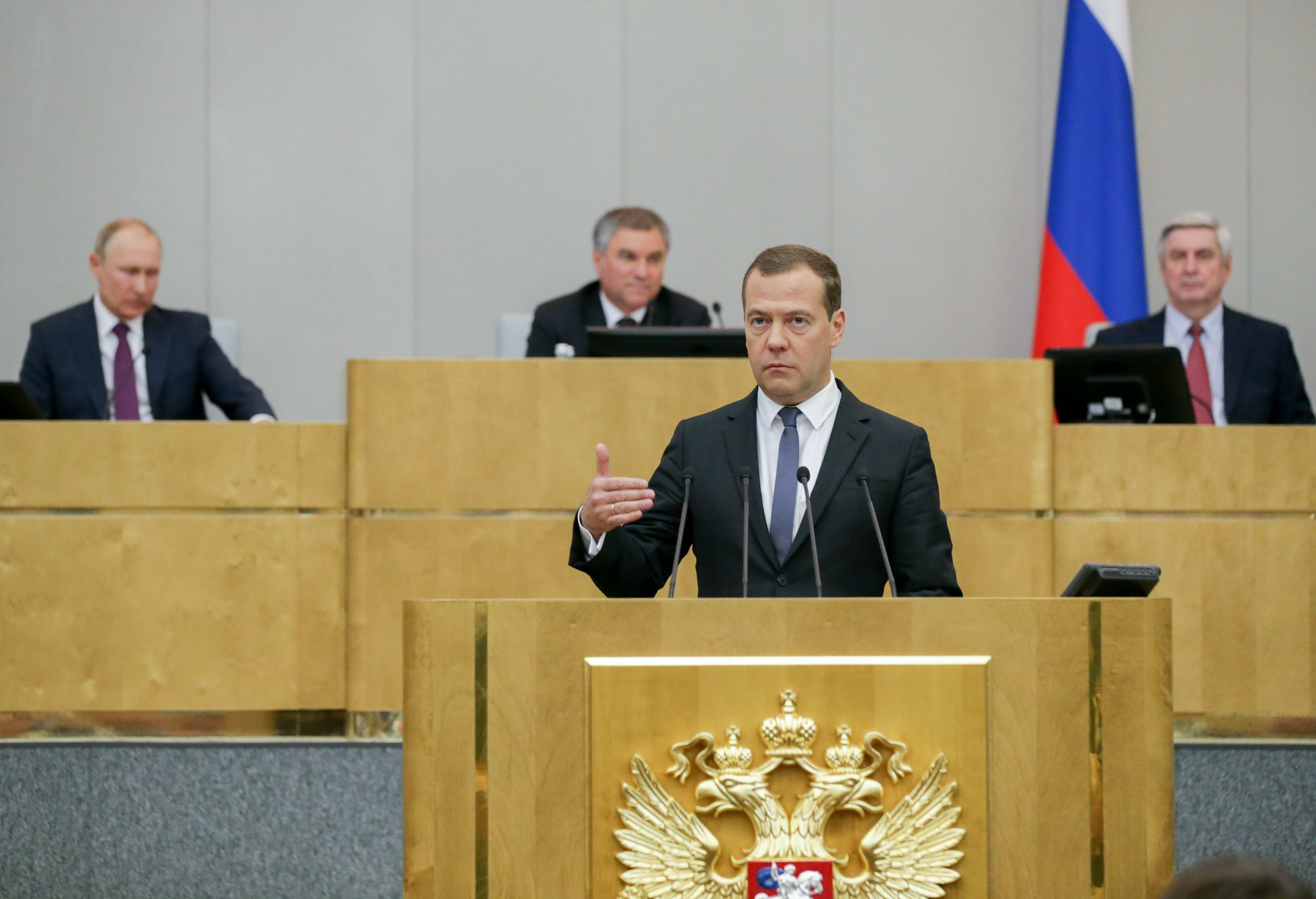
Medvedev at his confirmation hearing on 8 May 2018

On 8 May, Dmitry Medvedev was confirmed by the State Duma as Prime Minister.

Faction	Members	Yes	No	Abstained	Did not vote	Vacant
United Russia	339	330	0	0	9	
Communist Party	42	0	37	0	5	
Liberal Democratic Party	40	39	0	0	1	
A Just Russia	23	4	19	0	0	
Rodina	1	1	0	0	0	
Civic Platform	1	0	0	0	1	
All factions	446	374	56	0	16	4

=== Structure and composition ===
On 15 May, Dmitry Medvedev presented to President Vladimir Putin a draft structure of the Cabinet. Thus Ministry of Education and Science was divided into the Ministry of Education and the Ministry of Science and Higher Education.The Ministry of Communications and Mass Media was renamed to the Ministry of Digital Development, Communications and Mass Media. In addition it was established that the Prime Minister would have ten deputies. On the same day Putin signed a decree "On the Structure of Federal Executive Bodies".

On 18 May 2018, Dmitry Medvedev presented the composition of the Cabinet, and on the same day Putin approved the composition.

In general almost a third of the composition of the government was changed. 13 members retained their posts. Four people who were in the previous Cabinet remained in the government and took new positions. Two were past members of the government and returned to the government after a break. The remaining 12 members of the government were new to their positions.

== Subsequent changes ==
- On 26 February 2019, the Ministry for Development of the Russian Far East was renamed to the Ministry for Development of the Russian Far East and Arctic.

== Resignation ==
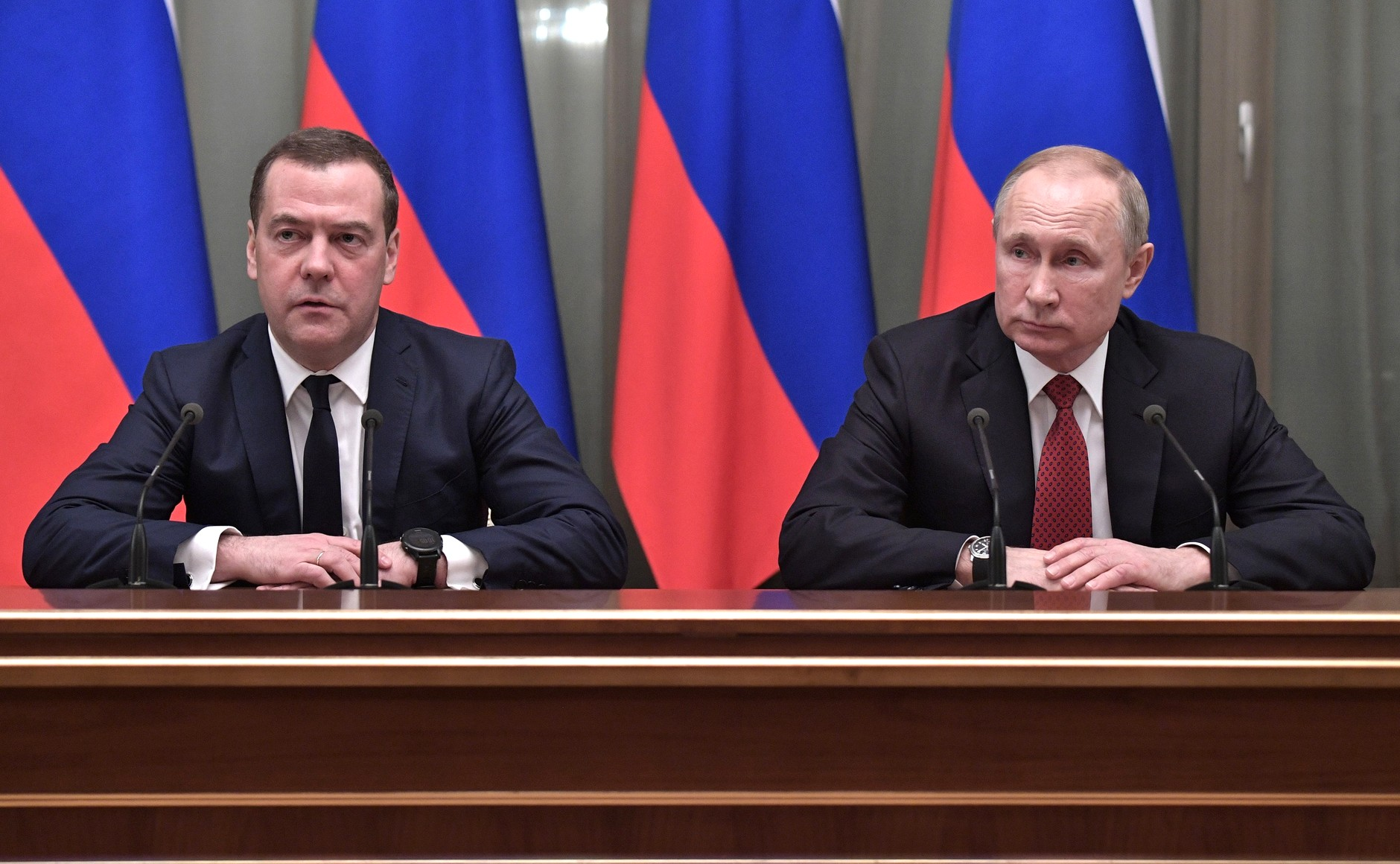
Medvedev and Putin during the announcement of the cabinet's resignation

Medvedev, along with his entire Cabinet resigned on 15 January 2020, after President Vladimir Putin delivered the Presidential Address to the Federal Assembly, in which he proposed several amendments to the constitution. Medvedev stated that he was resigning to allow President Putin to make the significant constitutional changes suggested by Putin regarding shifting power away from the presidency. Medvedev said that the constitutional changes would "significantly change Russia's balance of power". Putin accepted the resignation. However, on Putin's instructions, the Cabinet continued its work as a caretaker cabinet until the formation of a new government.

== Composition ==
Post	Image	Name	Party	Period
Prime Minister		Dmitry Medvedev	United Russia	18 May 2018 — 15 January 2020
Deputy Prime Ministers
First Deputy Prime Minister; Minister of Finance		Anton Siluanov	United Russia	18 May 2018 — 15 January 2020
Deputy Prime Minister for Agro-Industrial Complex, Natural Resources and Ecology		Alexey Gordeyev	United Russia	18 May 2018 — 15 January 2020
Deputy Prime Minister – Chief of Staff of the Government		Konstantin Chuychenko	United Russia	18 May 2018 — 15 January 2020
Deputy Prime Minister for Construction and Regional Development		Vitaly Mutko	United Russia	18 May 2018 — 15 January 2020
Deputy Prime Minister for Defense and Space Industry		Yury Borisov	Independent	18 May 2018 — 15 January 2020
Deputy Prime Minister for Fuel–Energy Complex and Industry		Dmitry Kozak	United Russia	18 May 2018 — 15 January 2020
Deputy Prime Minister – Presidential Envoy to the Far Eastern Federal District		Yury Trutnev	United Russia	18 May 2018 — 15 January 2020
Deputy Prime Minister for Social Policy		Tatyana Golikova	United Russia	18 May 2018 — 15 January 2020
Deputy Prime Minister for Tourism, Sport and Culture		Olga Golodets	United Russia	18 May 2018 — 15 January 2020
Deputy Prime Minister for Transport, Communications and Digital Economy		Maxim Akimov	United Russia	18 May 2018 — 15 January 2020
Federal Ministers
Minister of Agriculture		Dmitry Patrushev	Independent	18 May 2018 — 15 January 2020
Minister of Digital Development, Communications and Mass Media		Konstantin Noskov	Independent	18 May 2018 — 15 January 2020
Minister for Construction and Housing		Vladimir Yakushev	United Russia	18 May 2018 — 15 January 2020
Minister of Culture		Vladimir Medinsky	United Russia	18 May 2018 — 15 January 2020
Minister of Defence		Sergei Shoigu	United Russia	18 May 2018 — 15 January 2020
Minister for Development of the Russian Far East and Arctic		Alexander Kozlov	United Russia	18 May 2018 — 15 January 2020
Minister of Economic Development		Maxim Oreshkin	United Russia	18 May 2018 — 15 January 2020
Minister of Education		Olga Vasilieva	Independent	18 May 2018 — 15 January 2020
Minister of Emergency Situations		Yevgeny Zinichev	Independent	18 May 2018 — 15 January 2020
Minister of Energy		Alexander Novak	United Russia	18 May 2018 — 15 January 2020
Minister of Foreign Affairs		Sergey Lavrov	United Russia	18 May 2018 — 15 January 2020
Minister of Health		Veronika Skvortsova	Independent	18 May 2018 — 15 January 2020
Minister of Industry and Trade		Denis Manturov	United Russia	18 May 2018 — 15 January 2020
Minister of Internal Affairs		Vladimir Kolokoltsev	Independent	18 May 2018 — 15 January 2020
Minister of Justice		Aleksandr Konovalov	United Russia	18 May 2018 — 15 January 2020
Minister of Labour and Social Affairs		Maxim Topilin	United Russia	18 May 2018 — 15 January 2020
Minister of Natural Resources and Ecology		Dmitry Kobylkin	United Russia	18 May 2018 — 15 January 2020
Minister for North Caucasus Affairs		Sergey Chebotaryov	Independent	18 May 2018 — 15 January 2020
Minister of Science and Higher Education		Mikhail Kotyukov	United Russia	18 May 2018 — 15 January 2020
Minister of Sport		Pavel Kolobkov	Independent	18 May 2018 — 15 January 2020
Minister of Transport		Yevgeny Dietrich	United Russia	18 May 2018 — 15 January 2020
