= Igor Yusufov =

Russian energy minister (born 1956)

- Игорь Юсуфов
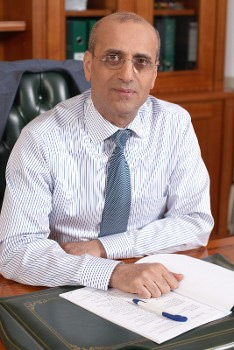
- Yusufov in 2011

Minister of Energy
- In office 16 June 2001 – 9 March 2004
- Prime Minister: Mikhail Kasyanov
- Preceded by: Alexander Gavrin
- Succeeded by: Viktor Khristenko (as Minister of Industry and Energy)

Personal details
- Born: Igor Khanukovich Yusufov; 12 June 1956 (age 70) Derbent, Dagestan ASSR, Russian SFSR, Soviet Union
- Education: Novocherkassk Polytechnic Institite; All-Union Academy of Foreign Trade
- Occupation: Economist
- Awards: Order "For Merit to the Fatherland", 4th class

Igor Khanukovich Yusufov (Russian: Игорь Ханукович Юсуфов; born 12 June 1956) is a former Russian energy Minister from 2001 to 2004. Founder and Chairman of a company engaged in consulting and co-operation projects in the energy sector in Russia, Europe and the United States

== Education and early life ==
=== 1979-1991 ===
Yusufov graduated from Novocherkassk Polytechnic Institute, then worked for "Mosenergo", USSR’s major power plant and later spent four years in Cuba as the technology expert at Havana Thermal Power Plant construction site. Following this he continued his academic studies and graduated from the Foreign Trade Academy.

== Government service ==
=== 1991 ===
As a Foreign Trade Academy graduate Yusufov entered the civil service.

He was appointed officer of the Committee for the Protection of Russia's Economic Interests reporting to the Vice-President Alexander Rutskoy, one level below the President of the ex-USSR. (Note: The office of Vice President of Russia was abolished after the 1993 Russian constitutional crisis (in which Rutskoy played a major role as an antagonist to then-President Boris Yeltsin), and the newly-created post of Prime Minister of Russia became the second-highest ranking office in Russia. Thus, no other person but Rutskoy has ever served under the formal title of Vice President of the Russian Federation.) When this post was in opposition to President Yeltsin, the committee was dissolved, but Yusufov moved to Chair of Deputy Minister of Foreign Economic Relations, with responsibility in promoting International Trade.

=== 1994 ===
Yusufov was appointed as Director General of state and private enterprise “R.-Vostok Trading”.

=== 1996 ===
The functions of "R.-Vostok Trading" were integrated to the parent state-owned company. The Prime Minister Viktor Chernomyrdin recommended to Yusufov his return to Government service at the post of Deputy Minister of Industry with oversight of Gold and diamond recovery.

=== 1997—2000 ===
Yusufov worked as Deputy General Director then as General Director of Goskomrezerv (from 1999 renamed- “Federal Agency for State Reserves, Rosrezerv”) thus being responsible for Russia’s mineral reserves. This State agency reporting to the Prime Minister manages and withholds state strategic reserves in case of war and natural disasters in the protected storage system across the country.

=== 2001–2011 ===
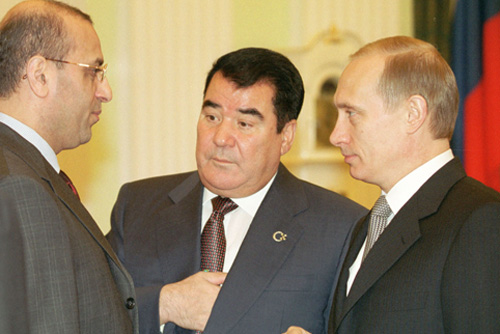
Yusufov with Russia's Vladimir Putin and Turkmenistan's Saparmurat Niyazov, January 2002

In 2001-2004 Yusufov worked as Minister of Energy for the Russian Federation.

Vladimir Putin appointed Yusufov to the post of Minister of Energy in 2001. Till late 2011 he served as Special Envoy of the Russian President for International Energy Cooperation, Ambassador at Large of the Russian Ministry of Foreign Affairs whereby the Minister was profiled across the Global Energy Players from U.S. Policy Makers to the Saudi King and OPEC opening to the world Russia's Energy resources.

In 2002, while serving as Minister of Energy, he initiated the first Russian-American Business Energy Summit (Houston, Texas, US), which took place on October 1–2. Yusufov was a co-chairman and one of the organizers, and signed a joint statement together with U.S. Secretary of Energy Spencer Abraham and U.S. Secretary of Commerce Donald Evans on cooperation between major oil, gas and energy companies in Russia and the United States, as well as promising projects. He also co-chaired the second summit held in St. Petersburg on September 22–23, 2003, together with Spencer and Evans. The second summit focused on energy cooperation, including new areas of cooperation on natural gas development and alternative energy sources.

In the mid-2010s, he was engaged in establishing cooperation with the Export-Import Bank of the United States as part of development of oil and gas projects.The Bank planned to invest $50 million, Igor Yusufov participated in profile meetings held in Washington in 2014 and 2016. Also in 2014, an agreement was signed with Halliburton to develop design documentation for the construction of exploration and production wells, build a sedimentological model and interpret geophysical well surveys (GIS), as well as data analysis from previously drilled wells for their possible re-conservation and retesting. Later, a memorandum was signed on service support for exploratory drilling in the 2014-2015 season.

== Retirement from government service and current business activity ==
Since 2011, Igor Yusufov has been active exclusively as a businessman and investor, notably in energy, renewables and mining projects. Fund Energy was acting as brand name in the energy industry. In 2012, media reports linked Fund to a potential purchase of the Coryton Refinery in Essex, England. In September 2021 Igor Yusufov ceased to be a participant at Fund Energy.

“Fund Energy” is one of the leading investors in energy industry. The majority of the group’s projects are focused on exploration and extraction of energy resources and development of renewable energy projects . In 2012, media reports linked Fund Energy to a potential purchase of the Coryton Refinery in Essex, England.

=== 2023–present ===
Since 2020 Igor Yusufov does not participate in the projects management, in September 2021 he ceased to be a participant at Fund “Energy”, and since March 2022 he no longer owns all the declared assets.

== Timeline ==
- 1979–1984: Engineer at Mosenergo.
- 1984–1988: Head of Expert Group at the Havana thermal power plant (Cuba).
- 1988–1991: Foreign Trade Academy, Moscow, Foreign Economic Relations Economist
- 1991–1992: Administration of the President of the Russian Federation Deputy Chairman of the Committee for Economic Interests of Russia
- 1992-1993: Deputy Minister of Foreign Economic Relations of Russia
- 1994–1996: Minority shareholder and Director General of public-private joint company “R.-Vostok Trading”
- 1996–1997: Deputy Industry Minister of the Russian Federation.
- 1998–2001: Chairman of the Russian Federal Agency for State Reserves.
- 2001–2004: Minister of Energy of the Russian Federation.
- 2001-2004: Board Director of RAO UES of Russia; Board Director of Transneft.
- 2002-2004: Chairman of the Board of Directors of OJSC Rosneft Oil Company and Transnefteproduct.
- 2003–2013: Member of the Board of Directors of Gazprom.
- 2004–2011: Special Presidential Envoy for International Energy Cooperation, Ambassador at Large of the Russian Ministry of Foreign Affairs, non-governmental, non-staff and advisory roles.
- 2011––2021: private investment activity in mining, renewable and alternative energy industries.

== Wealth ==
2018	2019	2020	2021	2022
$500 million	$850 million	$900 million	$1100 million	$1100 million

== Awards and titles ==
- 1st class Active State Councillor of the Russian Federation (2001).
- Ambassador Extraordinary and Plenipotentiary of the Russian Ministry of Foreign Affairs (2005).
- Order "For Merit to the Fatherland", IV Class (2006).
