= Alexander Pochinok =

Russian politician (1958–2014)

- Александр Починок
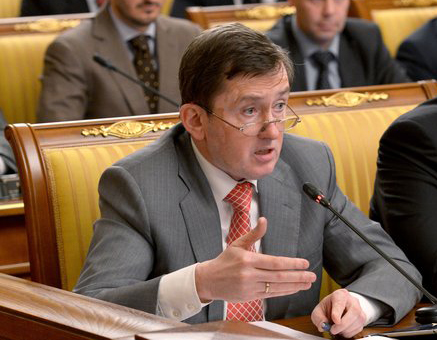
- Pochinok in 2013

Russian Federation Senator from Perm Krai
- In office 31 January 2012 – 2 July 2012
- Preceded by: Igor Shubin
- Succeeded by: Andrey Klimov

Russian Federation Senator from Krasnodar Krai
- In office 6 June 2007 – 14 October 2011
- Preceded by: Farkhad Akhmedov
- Succeeded by: Akhmed Bilalov

Minister of Labor and Social Development
- In office May 2000 – March 2004
- Prime Minister: Mikhail Kasyanov
- Preceded by: Sergey Kalashnikov
- Succeeded by: Mikhail Zurabov (for social development portfolio)

Minister of Taxes and Levies
- In office 25 May 1999 – 18 May 2000
- Prime Minister: Sergey Stepashin; Vladimir Putin
- Preceded by: Georgy Boos
- Succeeded by: Gennady Bukayev

Personal details
- Born: Alexander Petrovich Pochinok; 12 January 1958 Chelyabinsk, RSFSR, Soviet Union
- Died: 16 March 2014 (aged 56) Moscow, Russia
- Party: Civic Platform (2012–14)
- Other political affiliations: CPSU (1985–91), DVR (1993–2001), SPS (2001–08)
- Education: Chelyabinsk Lenin Komsomol Polytechnic Institute; Institute of Economy of the Soviet Academy of Sciences
- Aleksandr Ponchinok's voice Ponchinok's on the Echo of Moscow program, 17 December 2012

Alexander Petrovich Pochinok (Russian: Александр Петрович Починок; 12 January 1958 – 16 March 2014) was a Russian economist and politician. He was the minister of taxes and levies from 1999 to 2000 and minister of labor and social development from 2000 to 2004.

== Early life and education ==
Pochinok was born in Chelyabinsk on 12 January 1958. He graduated from Chelyabinsk Lenin Komsomol Memorial Polytechnic Institute with a degree in engineering and economics in 1980. He received a PhD in economics from the Institute of Economy of the Academy of Sciences of the Soviet Union in 1986.

== Career ==
From 1980 to 1990 Pochinok worked at the Soviet Academy of Sciences as a researcher. In 1990, he became a deputy at the Duma, representing Chelyabinsk. He was one of the earliest independent democrats elected to the Duma. He was made head of the Duma's budget committee. In September 1993, he resigned from the Duma. From 1993 to 1994 he served as deputy finance minister. In 1995, he was promoted to the academic rank of associate professor and in 1997, of professor of tax policy at the Plekhanov Russian University of Economics.

Pochinok was the head of the state tax service from 1998 to 1999, and Boris Fyodorov replaced him in the post. Then Pochinok served as the head of the department of finance and monetary credit regulation from 1998 to 1999. Pochinok was the minister of taxes and levies from 1999 to 2000. Gennady Bukayev replaced him in the post. In May 2000, President Vladimir Putin appointed Pochinok as minister of labor and social development to Prime Minister Mikhail Kasyanov's cabinet. Pochinok's term lasted until 2004 and Mikhail Zurabov succeeded him as minister of social development in March 2004. Then Pochinok served as deputy presidential plenipotentiary representative in the Southern Federal District. From 2007 to 2011 he represented Krasnodar Krai at the Federation Council.

In January 2012, Pochinok was appointed senator and became a member of the Federation Council. In October 2012 he became a functionary of the Civic Platform party organized by businessman Mikhail Prokhorov.

=== Views ===
Pochinok was one of the first liberal Russian economists. However, he later advocated Boris Yeltsin's economic approach in the mid-1990s.

== Personal life and death ==
Pochinok married twice. His second spouse, Natalia Gribkova, was his student and Russia’s light athletics champion, who was 20 years younger than him. He had two sons and a daughter.

Pochinok died of hemorrhagic stroke at the age of 56 in March 2014.
