= Tatyana Golikova =

Russian politician and economist (born 1966)

- Татьяна Голикова
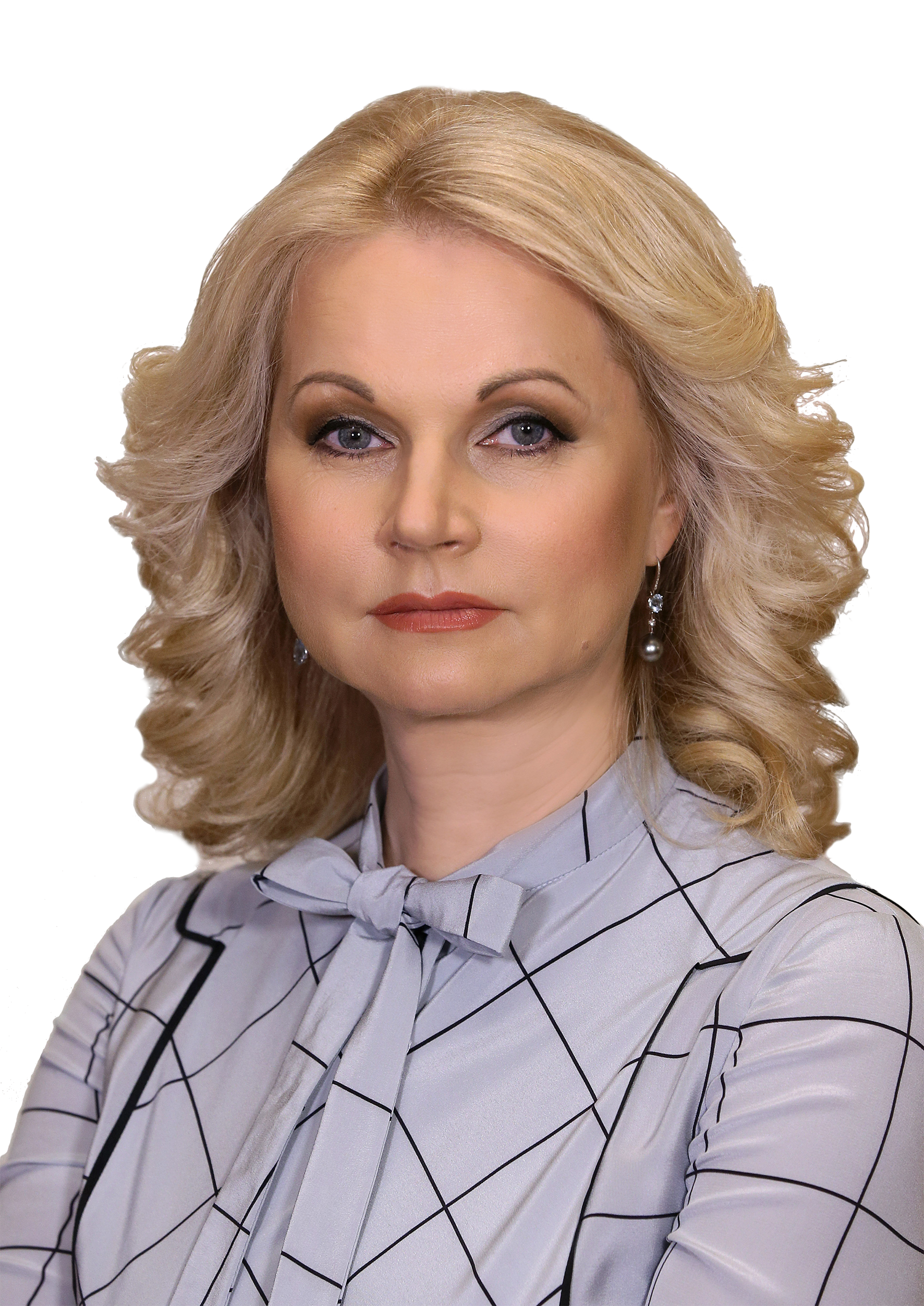
- Golikova in 2018

Deputy Prime Minister of Russia for Social Policy
- Incumbent
- Assumed office 18 May 2018; Acting: 15 January 2020 – 21 January 2020
- Prime Minister: Dmitry Medvedev; Mikhail Mishustin

Chairwoman of the Accounts Chamber
- In office 20 September 2013 – 17 May 2018
- Preceded by: Sergei Stepashin
- Succeeded by: Alexei Kudrin

Minister of Health and Social Development
- In office September 2007 – May 2012
- President: Vladimir Putin; Dmitry Medvedev
- Preceded by: Mikhail Zurabov
- Succeeded by: Veronika Skvortsova (as Minister of Health); Maxim Topilin (as Minister of Labour and Social Affairs)

Personal details
- Born: Tatyana Alexeyevna Golikova; 9 February 1966 (age 60) Mytishchi, Russian SFSR, Soviet Union
- Party: United Russia
- Spouse: Viktor Khristenko
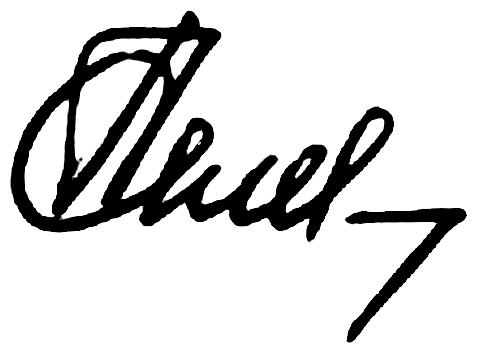
- Signature

Tatiana Alexeyevna Golikova (Russian: Татьяна Алексеевна Голикова; born 9 February 1966) is a Russian politician and economist who has served as Deputy Prime Minister of Russia for Social Policy, Labour, Health Care and Pension Provision since 2018.

She was Minister of Health and Social Development from 2007 to 2012, and served as Chairwoman of the Account Chamber of Russia between 2013 and 2018.

She holds the federal state civilian service rank of 1st class Active State Councillor of the Russian Federation.

== Early life and education ==
Golikova was born on 9 February 1966 in Mytishchi, then part of the Russian SFSR. She graduated from the Plekhanov Institute of the National Economy in 1987, having specialised in labour economics.

== Career ==
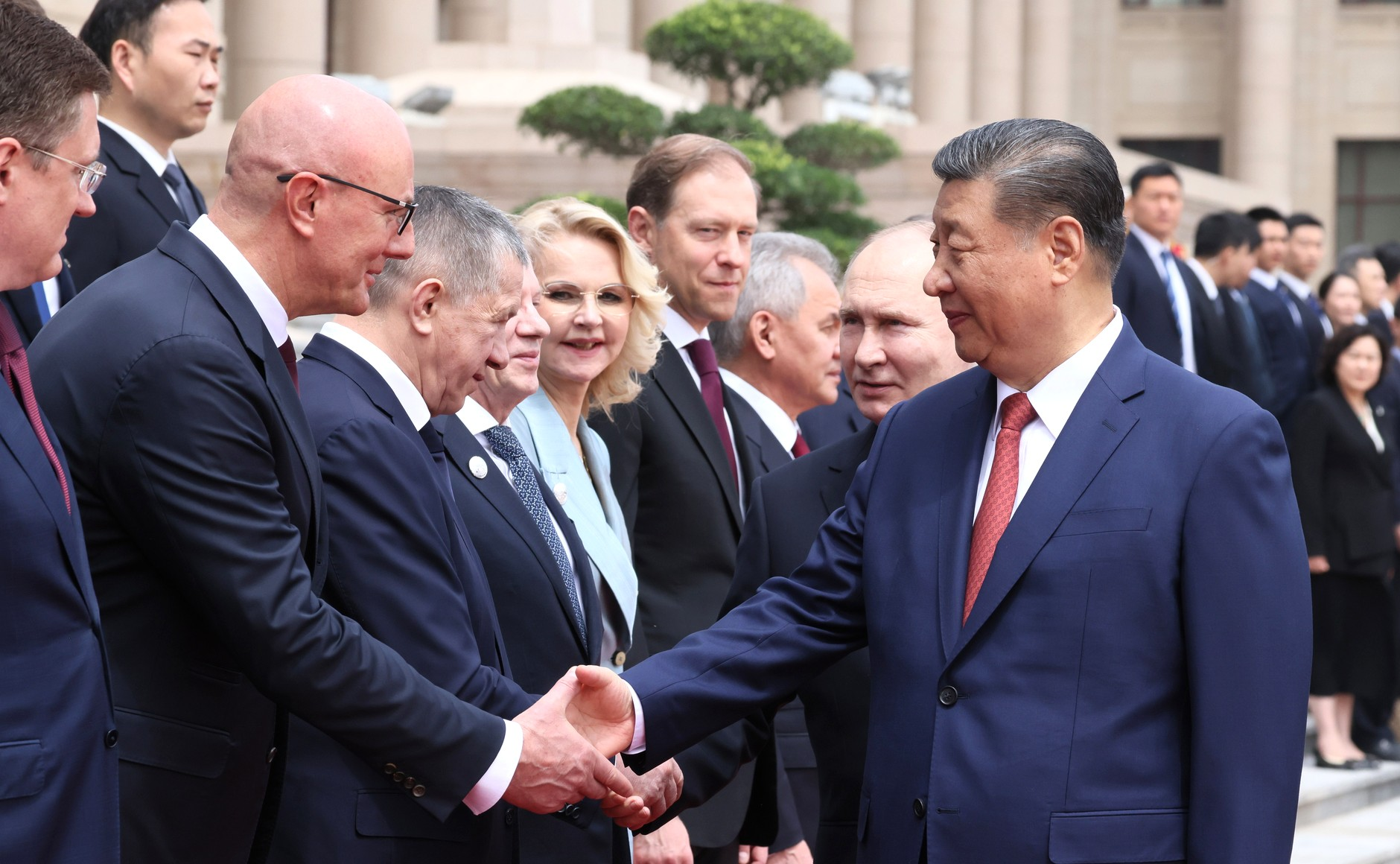
Golikova in Beijing during Putin's visit to China in May 2024

Golikova was an economist in the State Budget Department at the Finance Ministry from 1990 to 1992. She moved on to hold the post of Chief Economist in the State Budget Department at the Finance Ministry from 1992 to 1995 and was then Deputy Head of State Budget Department at the Finance Ministry from 1995 to 1998. From April to August 1998, she held the post of Head of State Budget Department at the Finance Ministry, before becoming Head of the Budget Policy Department from August 1998 to July 1999. She was deputy Finance Minister from July 1999 to 2002 and First Deputy Finance Minister from 2002 to 2004. She was a Deputy Finance Minister from 2004 to September 2007.

=== Minister ===
Golikova was appointed Minister of Health and Social Development in September 2007, at the request of Vladimir Putin. She had the additional responsibility of Deputy Chair of the Federal Antinarcotics Service (FSKN). In 2012 she resigned from office.

=== Deputy prime minister ===
On 18 May 2018, Golikova was appointed deputy prime minister in Dmitry Medvedev's Second Cabinet. On 21 January 2020, she maintained her position in Mikhail Mishustin's Cabinet. She was appointed the head of the Emergency Response Centre on preventing the import and spread of the Coronavirus in Russia later the same month.

== Sanctions ==
In December 2022 the European Union sanctioned Golikova in relation to the 2022 Russian invasion of Ukraine.

== Personal life ==
Golikova is married to Viktor Khristenko, the former Minister of Industry and Trade. They married in 2003. She has earned the nickname "Miss Budget".

== Awards and honours ==
Russia:

- "For Services to the Fatherland" in the 2nd Degree (2001).
- "For Services to the Fatherland" in the 1st Degree (2004)
- Order of Honour (2006)
- Order of Friendship (2006).

== Corruption allegations ==
Golikova has been widely accused of corruption by several Russian media outlets, mainly for her alleged connections to the Pharmstandard, which is a producer of the heavily-hyped drug Arbidol. After these allegations she was nicknamed "Madam Arbidol".

In 2022, the Anti-Corruption Foundation released an investigation claiming that Golikova, her husband and stepson owned an airplane; golf clubs in Spain and Russia; real estate in Spain, Portugal, French Riviera and Russia.
