= Vladimir Shcherbak (politician) =

Vladimir Nikolayevich Shcherbak (1939–2010) was a Soviet and Russian CPSU functionary and politician. His last positions before the retirement in 2000 were Deputy Chairman of Government of the Russian Federation (1999–2000) and Minister of Agriculture (1999).

He had the federal state civilian service rank of 1st class Active State Councillor of the Russian Federation.

He is buried in Troyekurovskoye Cemetery.
