= Alexey Gordeyev =

Russian politician (born 1955)

- Алексей Гордеев
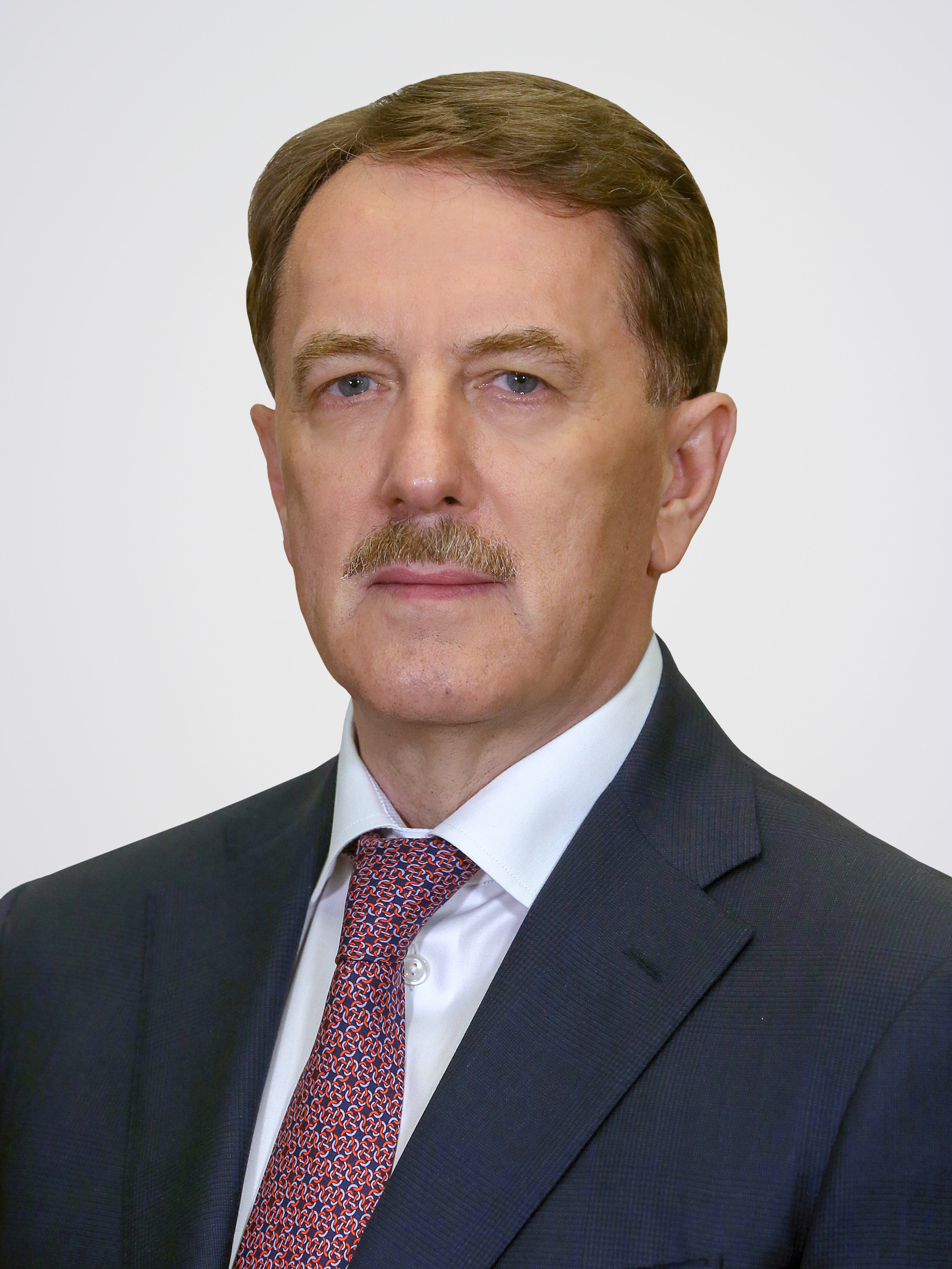
- Official portrait

Deputy Chairman of the State Duma
- Incumbent
- Assumed office 13 February 2020

Member of the State Duma for Voronezh Oblast
- Incumbent
- Assumed office 12 October 2021
- Preceded by: Andrey Markov
- Constituency: Pavlovsk (No. 90)

Member of the State Duma (Party List Seat)
- In office 12 February 2020 – 12 October 2021

Deputy Prime Minister
- In office 18 May 2018 – 15 January 2020
- Prime Minister: Dmitry Medvedev
- In office 19 May 2000 – 9 March 2004
- Prime Minister: Mikhail Kasyanov

Presidential Envoy to the Central Federal District
- In office 25 December 2017 – 18 May 2018
- President: Vladimir Putin
- Preceded by: Alexander Beglov
- Succeeded by: Igor Shchyogolev

6th Governor of Voronezh Oblast
- In office 12 March 2009 – 25 December 2017
- Preceded by: Vladimir Kulakov
- Succeeded by: Alexander Gusev

Minister of Agriculture
- In office 19 August 1999 – 12 March 2009
- Prime Minister: Vladimir Putin; Mikhail Kasyanov; Viktor Khristenko (acting); Mikhail Fradkov; Viktor Zubkov
- Preceded by: Vladimir Shcherbak
- Succeeded by: Yelena Skrynnik

Personal details
- Born: 28 February 1955 (age 71) Frankfurt an der Oder, German Democratic Republic
- Party: United Russia
- Spouse: Tatiana Alexandrovna
- Children: 2

Military service
- Allegiance: Soviet Union
- Years of service: 1978–1980

Alexey Vasilyevich Gordeyev (Russian: Алексей Васильевич Гордеев; born 28 February 1955) is a Russian politician who served as Member and Deputy Speaker of the State Duma. Previously he was the Deputy Prime Minister of Russia from 2000 to 2004 and from 2018 to 2020, Governor of Voronezh Oblast from 2009 to 2017 and Agriculture Minister of Russia from 1999 to 2009.

He has the federal state civilian service rank of 1st class Active State Councillor of the Russian Federation.

== Sanctions ==
Gordeyev was sanctioned by the UK government in 2022 in relation to the Russo-Ukrainian War.
