= Dmitry Kozak =

Russian politician; Vice Prime Minister of Russia (2008–2020)

- Дмитрий Козак
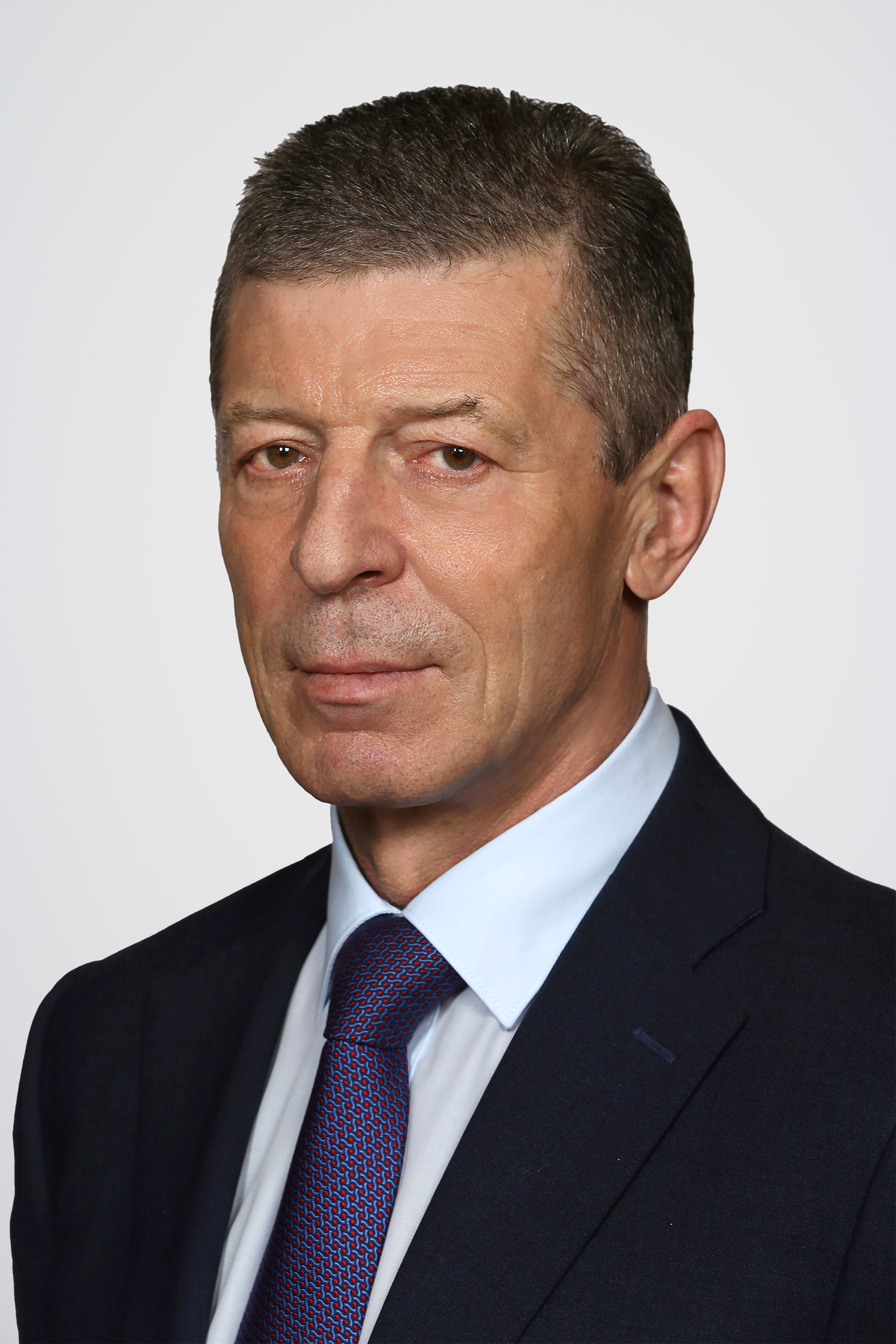
- Official portrait, 2018

Deputy Kremlin Chief of Staff
- In office 24 January 2020 – 17 September 2025
- President: Vladimir Putin

Deputy Prime Minister of Russia
- In office 14 October 2008 – 15 January 2020
- Prime Minister: Vladimir Putin; Viktor Zubkov (acting); Dmitry Medvedev

Minister of Regional Development
- In office 24 September 2007 – 14 October 2008
- Prime Minister: Viktor Zubkov
- Preceded by: Vladimir Yakovlev
- Succeeded by: Viktor Basargin

Personal details
- Born: 7 November 1958 (age 67) Bandurove, Kirovohrad Oblast, Ukrainian SSR, Soviet Union
- Party: United Russia

Dmitry Nikolayevich Kozak (Russian: Дмитрий Николаевич Кóзак, Russian pronunciation: [ˈdmʲitrʲɪj nʲɪkɐˈlajɪvʲɪtɕ ˈkozək]; Ukrainian: Дмитро Миколайович Козак, romanized: Dmytro Mykolayovych Kozak; born 7 November 1958) is a Russian politician who served as the Deputy Kremlin Chief of Staff from January 2020 to September 2025. He previously served as the Vice Prime Minister from 2008 to 2020. He has the federal state civilian service rank of 1st class Active State Councillor of the Russian Federation.

Known as the Cheshire Cat (Russian: Чеширский кот) because of his smile, Kozak is part of the Vlast' (Russian: Власть) or power group from St. Petersburg close to Putin.

He served previously as the Regional Development Minister in the Russian cabinet headed by Viktor Zubkov from 2007 to 2008. From 2004 to 2007, he served as Presidential Plenipotentiary Envoy in the Southern Federal District (North Caucasus and Southern European Russia).

Dmitry Kozak is a close ally of Vladimir Putin, having worked with him in the St Petersburg city administration during the 1990s and later becoming one of the key figures in Putin's presidential team. During the 2004 Russian presidential election, he worked as the head of Putin's election campaign team. Kozak chose not to run as a successor to Putin as president in 2008, saying he was "not ready".

== Early life and career ==
Dmitry Kozak was born on 7 November 1958 in the village of Bandurove, in the Kirovohrad region of the Ukrainian Soviet Socialist Republic (part of the USSR). He is of Ukrainian ethnicity.

From 1976 to 1978, Kozak served in the special forces (Spetsnaz GRU) of the Soviet military's Main Intelligence Directorate (GRU).

After Spetsnaz, he studied at the Vinnitsa Polytechnic Institute (Note: From 1976–1989, Ivan Vasilyevich Kuzmin, an expert in cybernetics, was the head of the Vinnitsa Polytechnic Institute (Russian: Винницкий политехнический институт; Ukrainian: Вінницький Національний Технічний Університет), which is now known as the Vinnitsa National Technical University (Russian: Винницкий Национальный Технический Университет) at Vinnytsia, Ukraine.) before he moved to Leningrad.

Kozak graduated from Leningrad State University (now St. Petersburg State University) in 1985 with a degree in law. From 1985 to 1989, he worked in the Leningrad prosecutor's office as a Prosecutor and Senior Prosecutor. He moved into the business sector in 1989, working as head of the legal department at Monolit-Kirovstroy construction company and chief legal consultant for the Association of Trade Ports.

== Political career ==
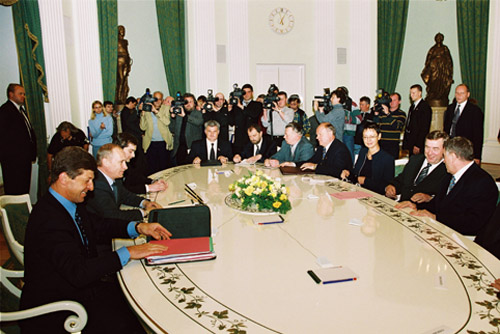
Putin and Kozak meeting with the leaders of State Duma parties and groups, 23 May 2001

Kozak worked as a public prosecutor in Leningrad and after the collapse of the Soviet Union, holding various legal offices in the city's administration. In 1998 he became Deputy Governor of Saint Petersburg.

In 1999, along with other St. Petersburg city officials, he joined the government of Vladimir Putin. He was Chief of Staff from 1999 to 2000. Dmitry Kozak became deputy head of the presidential administration and remained in this position under various titles until 2004. In 2003, he briefly entered international politics and unsuccessfully attempted to solve the conflict between Transnistria and Moldova (see Kozak memorandum).

In September 2004, Kozak was appointed Presidential Plenipotentiary Envoy to the Southern Federal District, replacing Vladimir Yakovlev. On 24 September 2007, he was appointed to the new Russian cabinet headed by Viktor Zubkov as regional development minister, succeeding Vladimir Yakovlev again, and leaving his previous position. On 14 October 2008, he became deputy prime minister of Russia and served until 2020. On 15 January 2020, he resigned as part of the cabinet, after President Vladimir Putin delivered the Presidential Address to the Federal Assembly, in which he proposed several amendments to the constitution.

According to Stanislav Belkovsky, Kozak is not well liked by Putin's entourage, but Vladimir Putin does like Kozak, apparently wanting to appoint Kozak as prime minister in 2004 and tapping Kozak as the successor to Putin as president in 2008, however, Dmitry Medvedev won the presidential race. Alexei Makarkin of the Center for Political Technologies said that Putin trusts Kozak as one of his men.

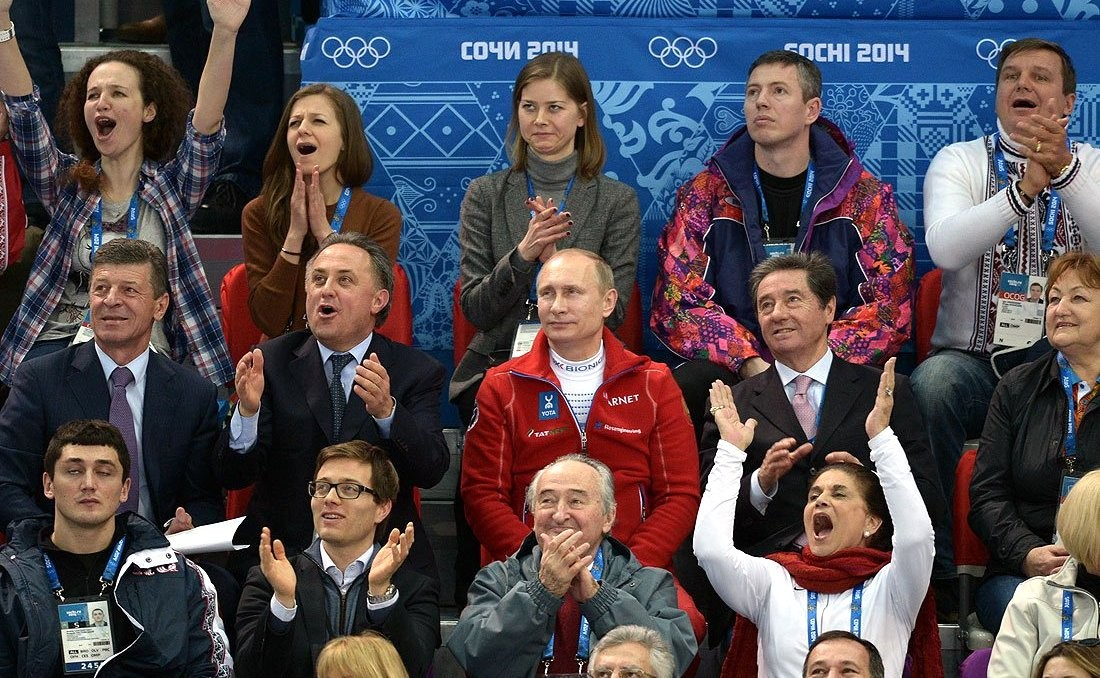
Putin and Kozak at the Winter Olympics in Sochi, 9 February 2014

Dmitry Kozak was the main overseer for the XXII Olympic Winter Games in Sochi.

Following Russia's intervention into Crimea, Kozak was appointed to greatly strengthen Crimea's social, political, and economic ties to Russia.

On the first day of Russian's invasion of Ukraine in 2022, Kozak rang Zelensky and Andrii Yermak stating it was time for Ukrainians to surrender. Yermak swore and hung up. According to sources close to the Kremlin, Kozak was against the invasion of Ukraine. Putin wanted to annex southeastern Ukraine, and for that reason he allegedly rejected a peace deal brokered by Kozak guaranteeing that Ukraine would not join NATO if Russia stopped attacking Ukraine.

In September 2025, Kozak submitted his resignation as Putin's deputy chief of staff. In December 2025 New York Times published a more detailed description of the events of 2022, in which Kozak was categorically against full-scale invasion on Ukraine, realizing the scale of resistance Russian army will face there. He was however sidetracked by Putin for what he perceived as disobedience, when Kozak called representatives of the Ukrainian government on 25 February trying to reach a ceasefire while Putin insisted he will "only accept Ukraine's surrender".

== Sanctions ==
On 28 April 2014, following the Crimean status referendum, the U.S. Treasury put Kozak on the Specially Designated Nationals List (SDN), a list of individuals sanctioned as “members of the Russian leadership’s inner circle.” The sanctions freeze any assets he holds in the US and ban him from entering the United States.

On 29 April 2014, Kozak was added to the European Union sanctions list due to his role in the annexation of Crimea by the Russian Federation. He is barred from entering the EU countries, and his assets in the EU are frozen.

He was sanctioned by the UK government in 2014 in relation to the Russo-Ukrainian War.

== Honours and awards ==
- Order of Merit for the Fatherland
  - 1st class (2014)
  - 2nd class (6 November 2008)
- Olympic Order – 2014 (withdrawn on 28 February 2022 due to invasion of Ukraine)
- Paralympic Order – 2014 (withdrawn on 3 March 2022 due to invasion of Ukraine)

== Notes ==
Diplomatic posts
Preceded by Vladimir Yakovlev	Presidential Envoy to the Southern Federal District; 13 September 2004 - 24 September 2007	Succeeded by Grigory Rapota
