= Viktor Khristenko =

Russian politician (born 1957)

- Виктор Христенко
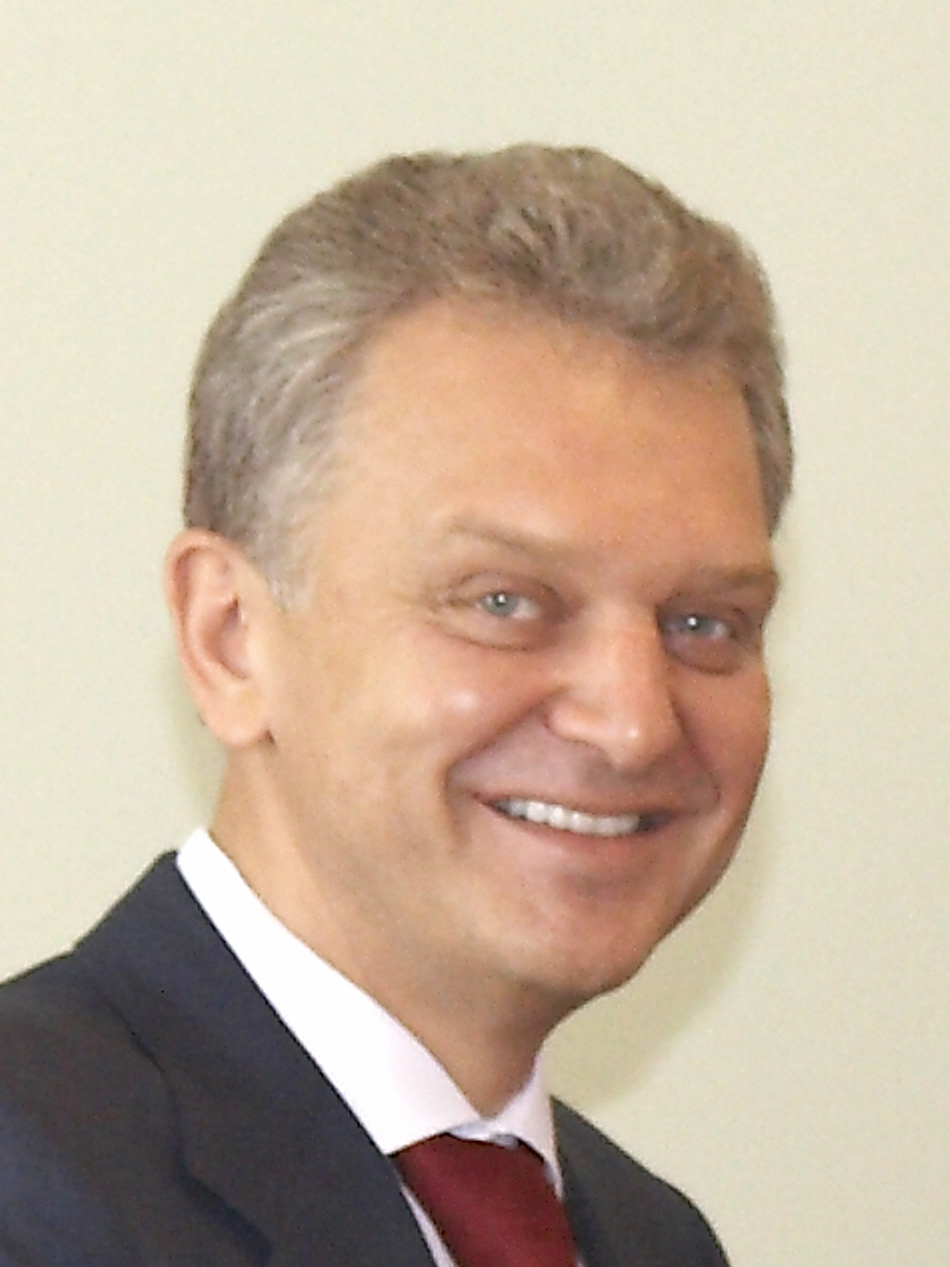
- Khristenko in 2007

Chairman of the Board of the Eurasian Economic Commission
- In office 1 February 2012 – 1 February 2016
- Preceded by: post established
- Succeeded by: Tigran Sargsyan

Minister of Industry
- In office 9 March 2004 – 31 January 2012
- Preceded by: Andrey Fursenko
- Succeeded by: Denis Manturov

First Deputy Prime Minister of Russia
- In office 31 May 1999 – 10 January 2000
- Prime Minister: Sergei Stepashin; Vladimir Putin
- Preceded by: Mikhail Zadornov
- Succeeded by: Mikhail Kasyanov

Personal details
- Born: 28 August 1957 (age 69) Chelyabinsk, Russian SFSR, Soviet Union
- Spouse: Tatyana Golikova
- Children: 3

Viktor Borisovich Khristenko (Russian: Виктор Борисович Христенко; born 28 August 1957) is a Russian politician who was chairman of the board of the Eurasian Economic Commission from 1 February 2012 to 1 February 2016. He was First Deputy Prime Minister of Russia from 31 May 1999 to 10 January 2000 and Minister of Industry from 9 March 2004 to 31 January 2012.

== Early life and education ==
Khristenko was born in Chelyabinsk on 28 August 1957. Khristenko graduated in 1979 from Chelyabinsk Mechanical Engineering Institute with a specialization in construction management and Economics. In 1983, he completed his Candidate of Sciences in Management at the Moscow Institute of Management. Khristenko has acknowledged the influence of Georgy Shchedrovitsky in his approach to management. He contributed three chapters to Methodological School of Management, a book based on the work of Shchedrovitsky's Moscow Methodological Circle and its successors.

== Career ==
=== Ministerial posts in the Yeltsin Presidency ===
In 1998, Viktor Khristenko was appointed Deputy Prime Minister for Economy and Finance in Sergei Kiriyenko's Cabinet. Described as a "little-known reformist", his appointment drew quite some attention as it was seen as a sign towards economic reform under the Yeltsin Presidency. He however didn't survive the government reshuffling under the following Prime Minister Primakov. From 1999 until early 2000, he was however appointed to Vladimir Putin's First Cabinet serving as First Deputy Prime Minister.

=== Ministerial posts in the Putin Presidency ===
In February 2004, Khristenko briefly served as the acting Prime Minister of Russia, when President Vladimir Putin fired Prime Minister Mikhail Kasyanov on 24 February 2004.

Khristenko was described as a "broadly reformist technocrat," who had shown "loyalty mixed with extreme caution," unlike the outgoing prime minister who had "openly disagreed with Mr Putin several times, criticizing the criminal investigations into the owners of Yukos. The Washington Post called Kasyanov "the most powerful ally of big business remaining in the Russian government." Khristenko, 46 at the time, was promoted from deputy prime minister to acting prime minister. Putin commented that Kasyanov's ousting was not related to the results of the government's activities, which he characterized as positive, but rather was caused by a necessity to once again confirm his position, which would guide the development of the country after 14 March 2004.

Two weeks ahead of the 2004 presidential election, Putin however nominated Mikhail Fradkov to become the next prime minister, four days later to be confirmed by the State Duma. On 9 March 2004, Khristenko was appointed Minister of Industry and Trade instead, a post which he held until 31 January 2012.

=== Chairman of the Eurasian Economic Commission ===
Khristenko became the first Chairman of the Eurasian Economic Commission, which started operations in February 2012. He resigned on 1 February 2016.

== Personal life ==
Khristenko's second wife, Tatyana Golikova, was Minister of Health and Social Development from 2007 to 2012. They married in 2003.

== Honours and awards ==
- Order of Merit for the Fatherland;
  - 3rd class (3 October 2007) - for his great personal contribution to the economic policy of the state and many years of fruitful activity
  - 4th class (28 August 2006) - for his great personal contribution to the development of technical and economic cooperation between the states
- Grand Officer of the Order of Merit of the Italian Republic (2009)
- Gratitude of the President of the Russian Federation
- Diploma of the Russian Federation Government
- Order of the Holy Prince Daniel of Moscow, 1st class (Russian Orthodox Church, 2010)
- Order of Friendship, 2nd class (Kazakhstan, 2002)

Political offices
Preceded by Mikhail Kasyanov	Acting Prime Minister of Russia; 2004	Succeeded by Mikhail Fradkov
