= Candidates in the 2008 Russian presidential election =

2008 Russian presidential candidates
- Opinion polls

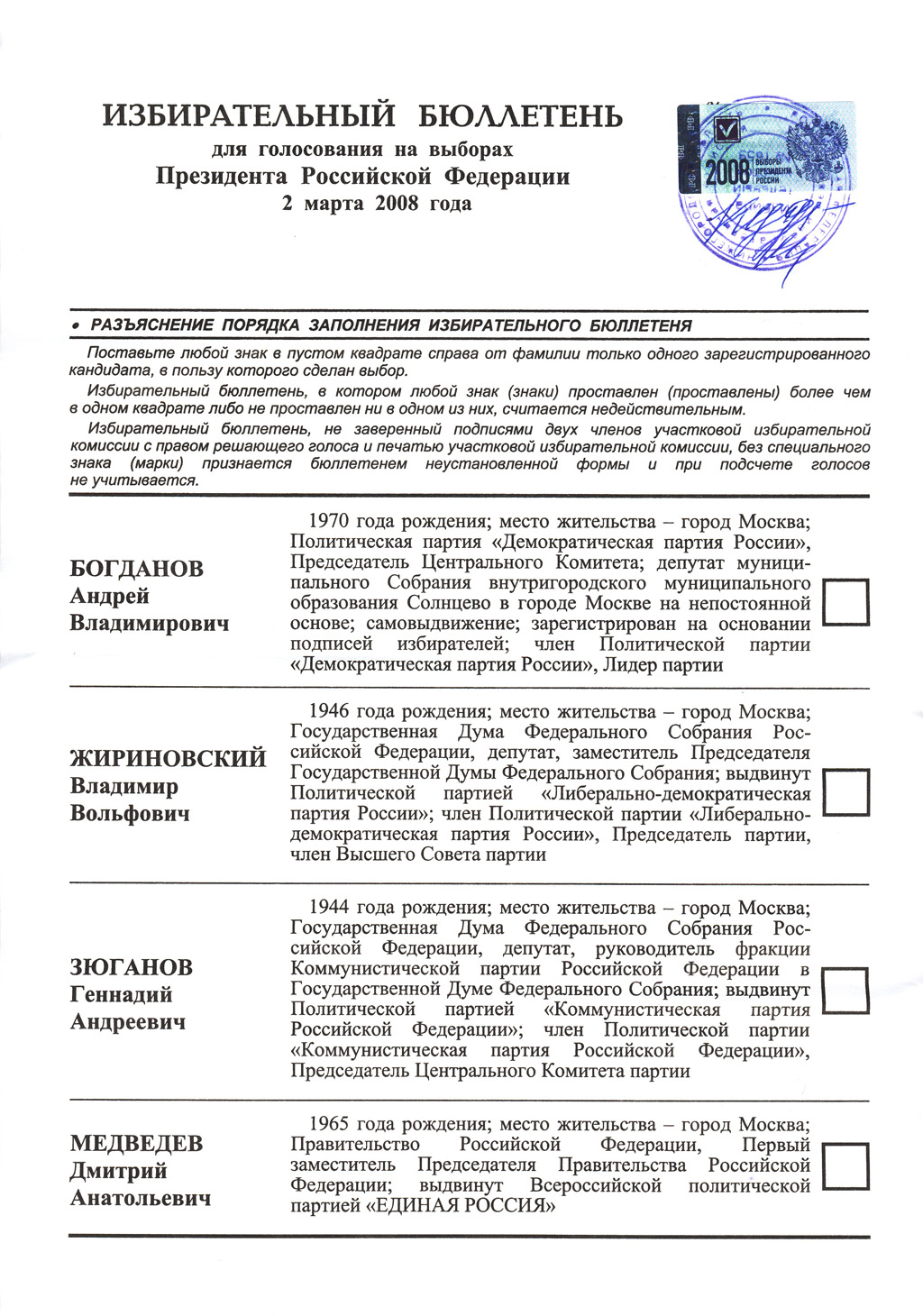
An election ballot listing the presidential candidates

This article contains the list of candidates associated with the 2008 Russian presidential election.

== Registered candidates ==
Candidates are listed in the order they appear on the ballot paper (alphabetical order in Russian).

Candidate name, age, political party	Political offices	Details	Registration date
Andrey Bogdanov (38); Democratic Party (campaign)	Leader of the Democratic Party (2005–2014); Grand Master of the Grand Lodge of Russia (2007–present)	Registered as a candidate on January 24. Bogdanov had an investigation opened against him for providing too many forged signatures of support for his nomination, but it was reported that even if the accusations were to be proven, his candidacy would not be dismissed. At 38, he was the youngest person to run for president in Russia, a record he would retain until 2018.	24 January 2008
Vladimir Zhirinovsky (61); Liberal Democratic Party (campaign)	Deputy of the State Duma (1994–2022); Leader of the Liberal Democratic Party (1991–2022)	Zhirinovky ran for the presidency on three prior occasions: in 1991, 1996 and 2000. His best result was third with 7.81% support. Registered as a candidate on December 26.	26 December 2007
Gennady Zyuganov (63); Communist Party (campaign)	Deputy of the State Duma (1994–present); Leader of the Communist Party (1993–present)	Zyuganov ran for president in 1996 (when he came short just a few percent of the votes) and 2000, but not in 2004. Officially nominated on December 15, 2007 with 215 of 218 votes in favor. Registered as a candidate on December 26.	26 December 2007
Dmitry Medvedev (42); United Russia (campaign)	First Deputy Prime Minister of Russia (2005–2008); Kremlin Chief of Staff (2003–2005)	Medvedev was nominated by the United Russia party, and supported by the parties A Just Russia, Agrarian Party, The Greens and Civilian Power. In addition he was supported by incumbent president Vladimir Putin.	21 January 2008

=== Withdrawn candidates ===
Candidate name, age, political party	Political offices	Details	Registration date	Date of withdrawal
Boris Nemtsov (48); Union of Right Forces (campaign)	Deputy of the State Duma (2000–2003); Deputy Prime Minister of Russia (1997–1998); Minister of Fuel and Energy (1997); Governor of Nizhny Novgorod Oblast (1991–1997)	Nemtsov was nominated by the Union of Right Forces on December 18, 2007 and was registered as a candidate on December 22. He withdrew his bid on December 26 and called on his supporters to vote for Mikhail Kasyanov instead.	22 December 2007	26 December 2007

== Rejected candidates ==
The following candidates were denied registration by the CEC:

Name	Image	Party	Profession	Reason for rejection
Vladimir Bukovsky (campaign)		Independent	Activist, Soviet-era dissident	On August 3, 2007 Bukovsky received a new Russian passport at the Russian Embassy in London. He arrived in Moscow in October to launch his campaign. His bid was refused on the grounds that he hadn't lived in Russia over the last 10 years.
Mikhail Kasyanov (campaign)		People's Democratic Union	Former Prime Minister and current leader of the People's Democratic Union	It was not known if Kasyanov would continue his candidacy after Garry Kasparov entered the race, but on December 8, 2007 he reaffirmed he would run in the election. He successfully registered as a candidate on December 14, but later it was decided that too many of his signatures of support were forged and he was disqualified. Kasyanov appealed the decision to the Supreme Court, which rejected the appeal on February 6, 2008.
Nikolai Kuryanovich		Independent	Ultra-nationalist politician, former Deputy of the State Duma from LDPR	Kuryanovich failed to hold a meeting of the citizens who supported his bid as an independent and did not provide the necessary number of signatures required for self-nomination.
Oleg Shenin (campaign)		Communist Party of the Soviet Union	Leader of the Communist Party of the Soviet Union, a minor hard-left party	Shenin's bid was not registered due to bureaucratic mistakes in his documents.

== Declared candidates who withdrew without registering ==
Many Russian politicians publicly indicated their intention to run for president in 2008, but failed to submit their nominations:

- Garry Kasparov, former World Chess Champion and United Civil Front leader. Before announcing his candidacy, he was previously inclined to endorse Viktor Gerashchenko. He failed to nominate by the deadline, citing government obstructions in finding a suitable congress venue as the reason.
- Alexander Donskoy, mayor of Arkhangelsk. He was charged with abuse of office, detained for several months and released on March 6, 2008 with a probationary sentence.
- Viktor Gerashchenko (campaign)– former head of the Central Bank and former deputy of the nationalist Rodina party who later joined the Other Russia coalition. He was initially the favored candidate of Garry Kasparov.
- Sergey Gulyayev – former St Petersburg Yabloko regional legislator who announced his intention to run, despite the fact that Yabloko's leader had also declared his intention to stand. Gulyayev was the fourth candidate from the Other Russia coalition to announce his candidacy.
- Gennadiy Seleznyov – former Speaker of the Duma (in 1995–2003); former member of the CPRF; leader of the socialist Party of Russia's Rebirth.
Viktor Gerashchenko

Sergey Gulyayev

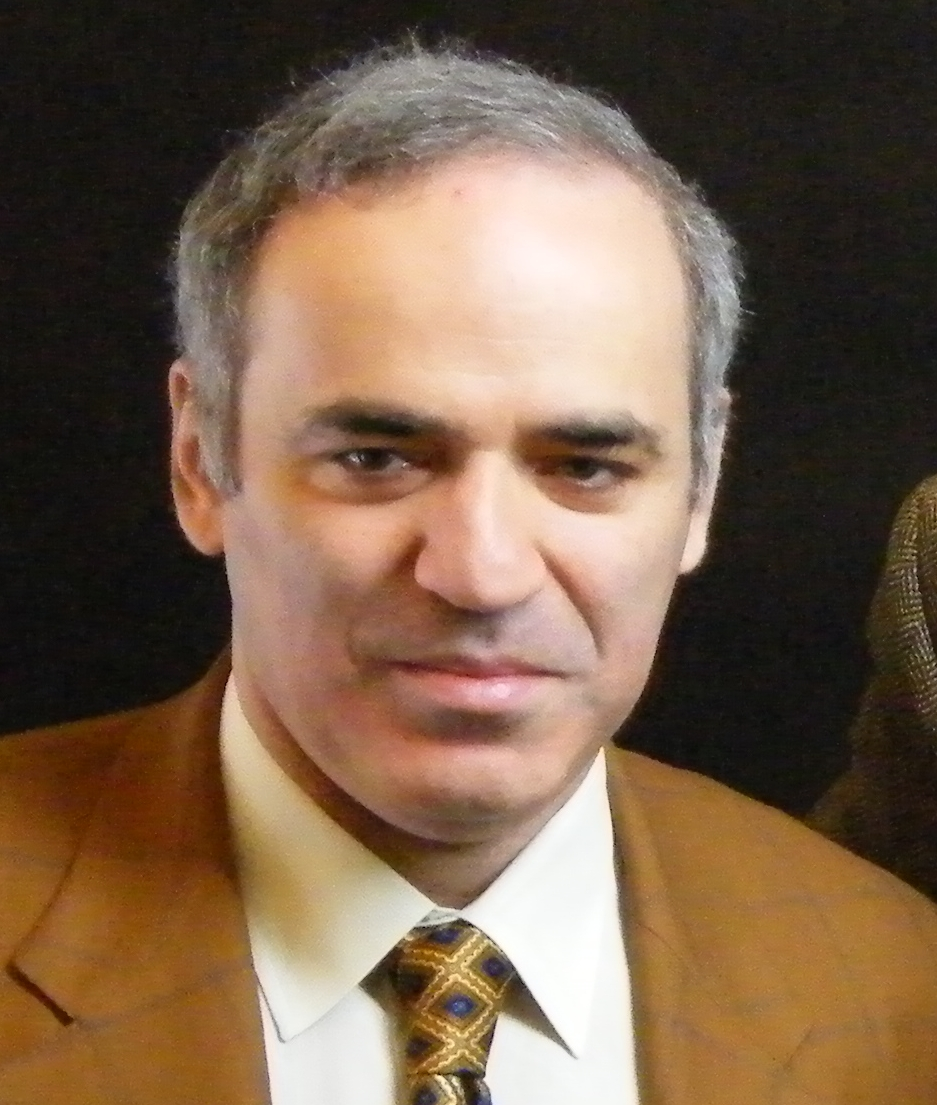
Garry Kasparov

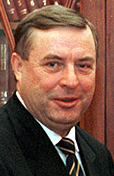
Gennadiy Seleznyov

== Possible candidates who did not run ==
The following individuals were included in some polls, were referred to in the media as possible candidates or had publicly expressed interest long before the elections but never announced that they would run.

=== United Russia ===
- Mikhail Fradkov, former prime minister of Russia (2004–2007)
- Boris Gryzlov, speaker of the State Duma (2003–2011), former minister of internal affairs (2001–2003)
- Sergei Ivanov, first deputy prime minister, former minister of defence (2001–2007)
- Dmitry Kozak, deputy prime minister
- Sergey Lavrov, minister of foreign affairs
- Yury Luzhkov, mayor of Moscow (1992–2010)
- Valentina Matviyenko, governor of Saint Petersburg (2003–2011)
- Vladimir Putin, president of Russia (2000–2008), constitutionally barred from running
- Sergey Shoygu, minister of emergency situations (1994–2012)
- Sergey Sobyanin, Kremlin Chief of Staff (2005–2010), former governor of Tyumen Oblast (2001–2005)
- Aman Tuleyev, 1991, 1996 and 2000 candidate, governor of Kemerovo Oblast (1997–2018)
- Vladimir Yakunin, president of Russian Railways (2005–2015)
- Alexander Zhukov, deputy prime minister
- Viktor Zubkov, prime minister of Russia (2007–2008)
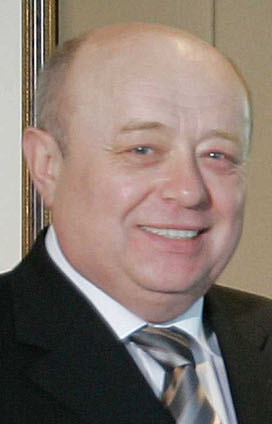
Mikhail Fradkov

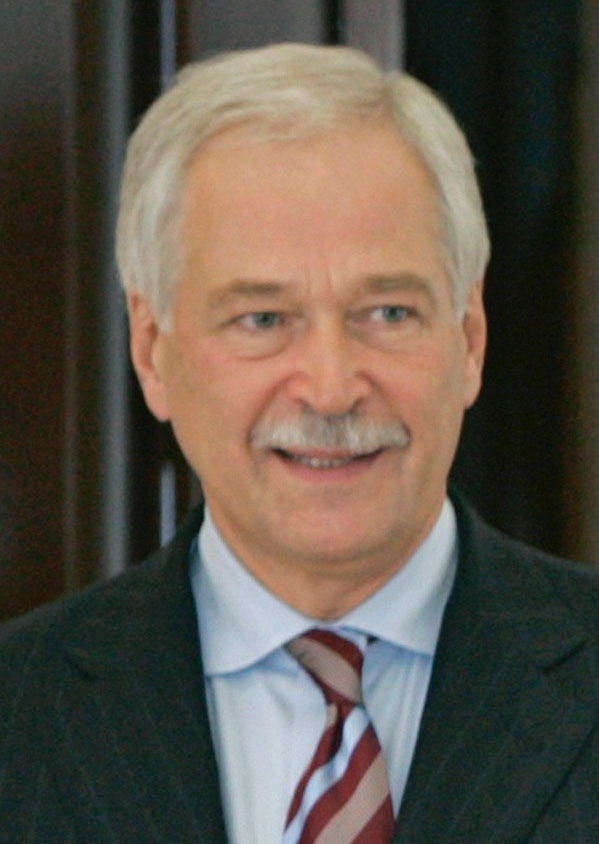
Boris Gryzlov

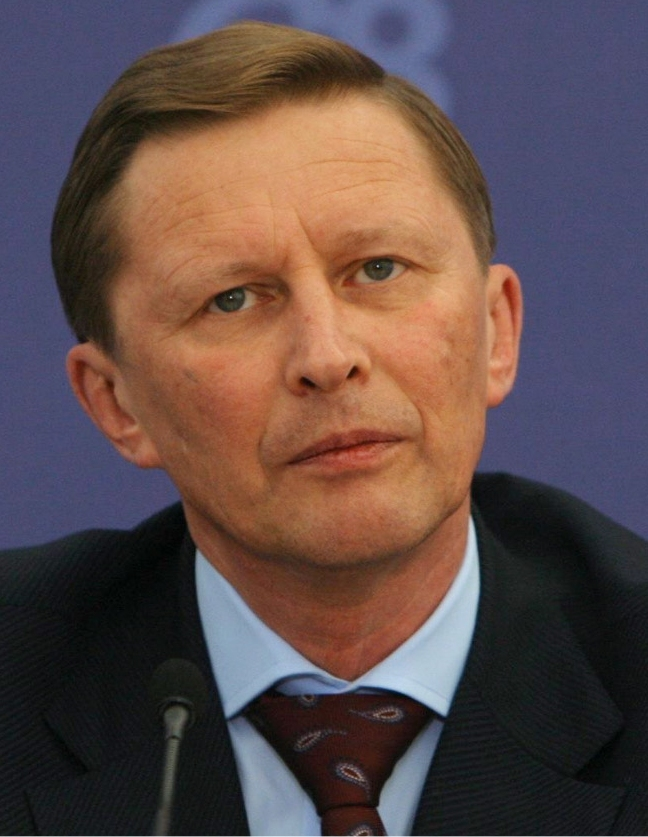
Sergei Ivanov

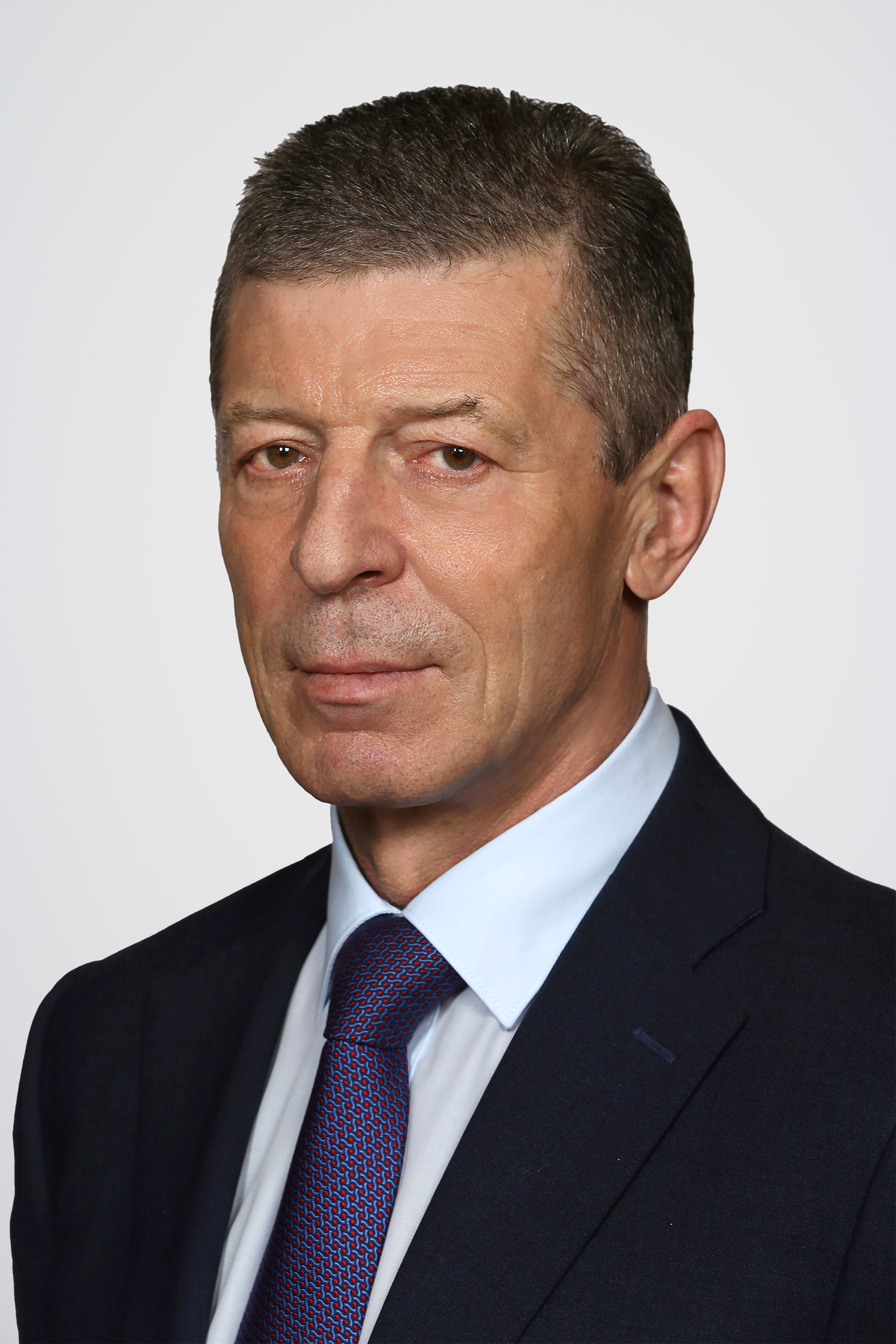
Dmitry Kozak

Sergey Lavrov

Yury Luzhkov

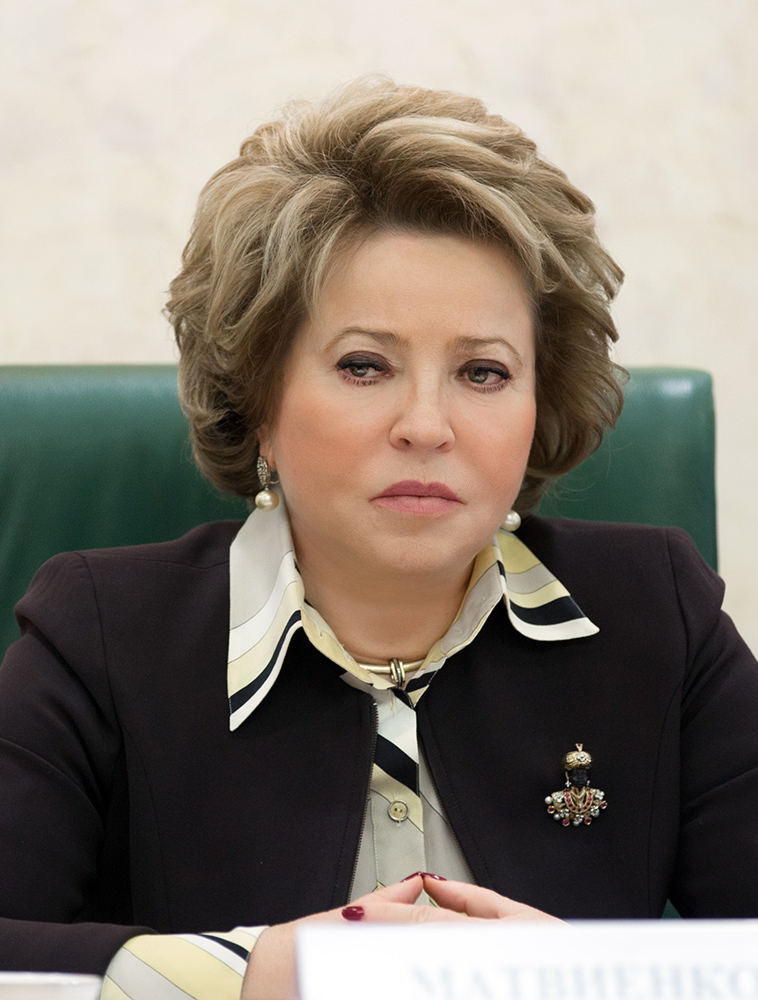
Valentina Matviyenko

Vladimir Putin

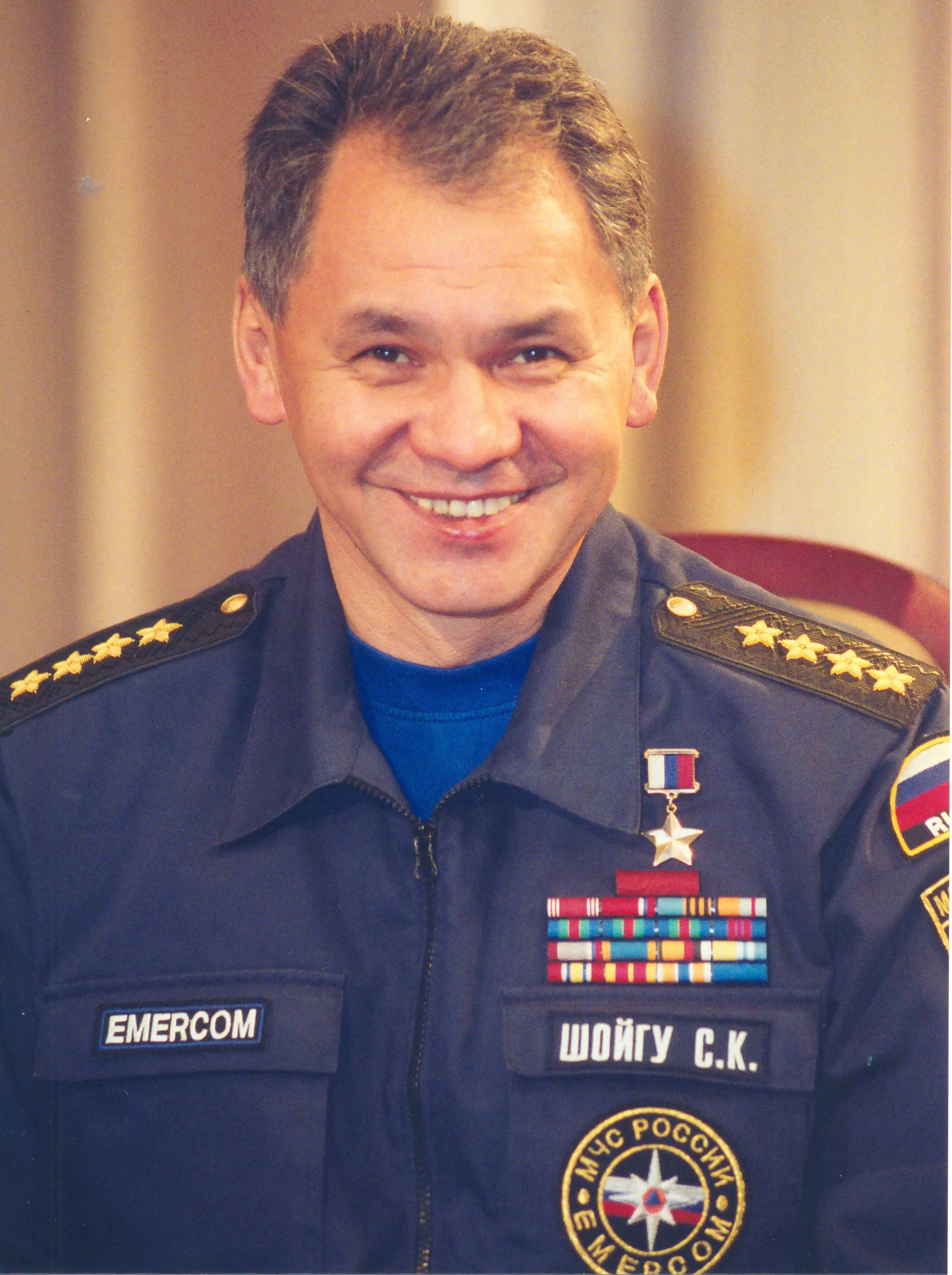
Sergey Shoygu

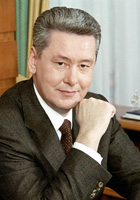
Sergey Sobyanin

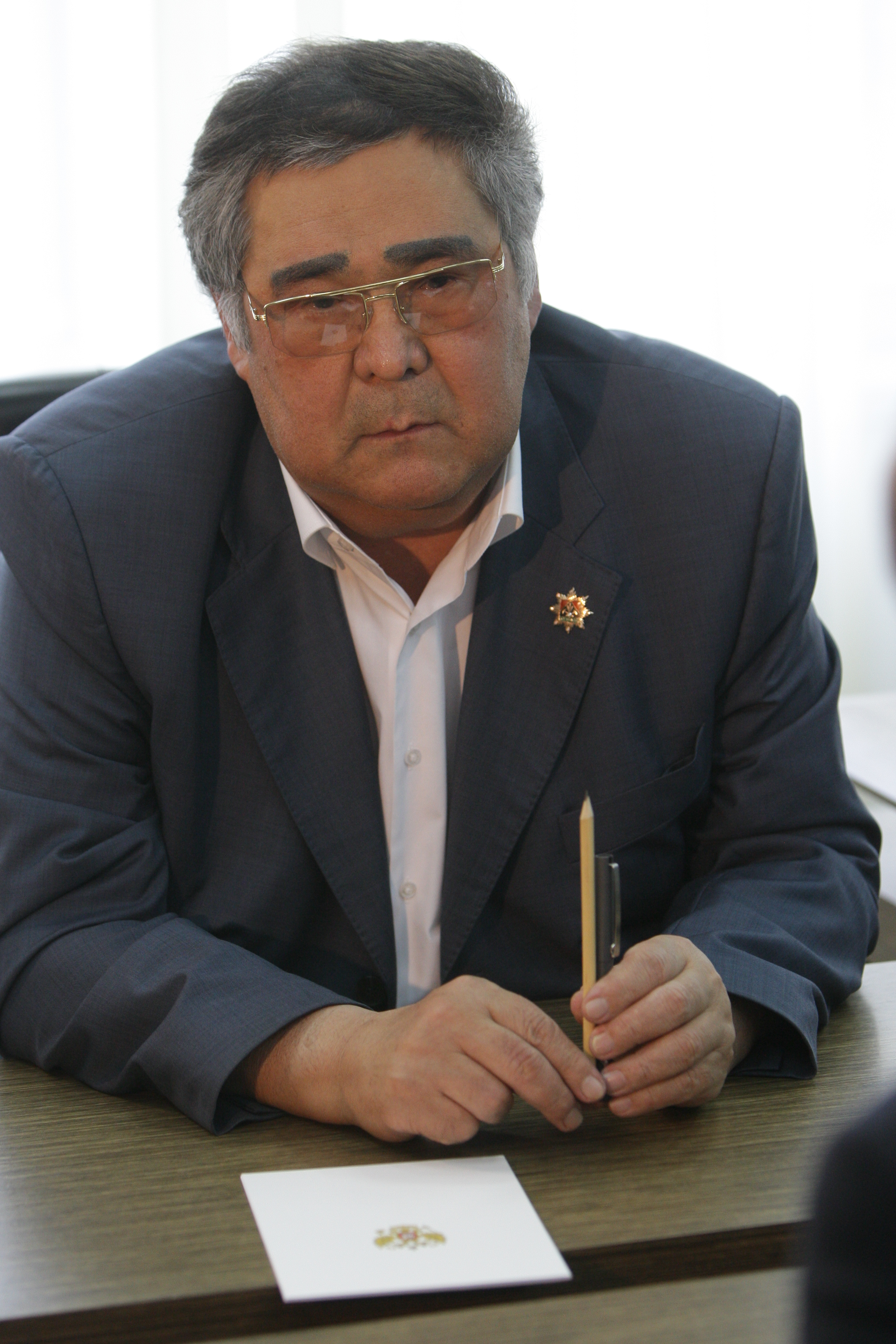
Aman Tuleyev

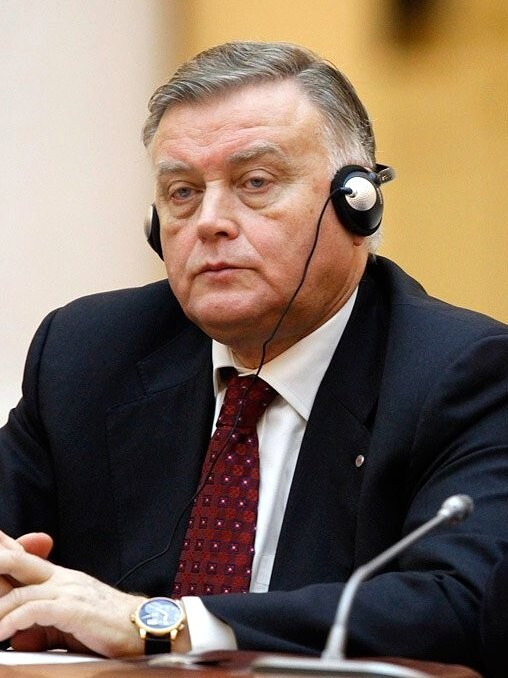
Vladimir Yakunin

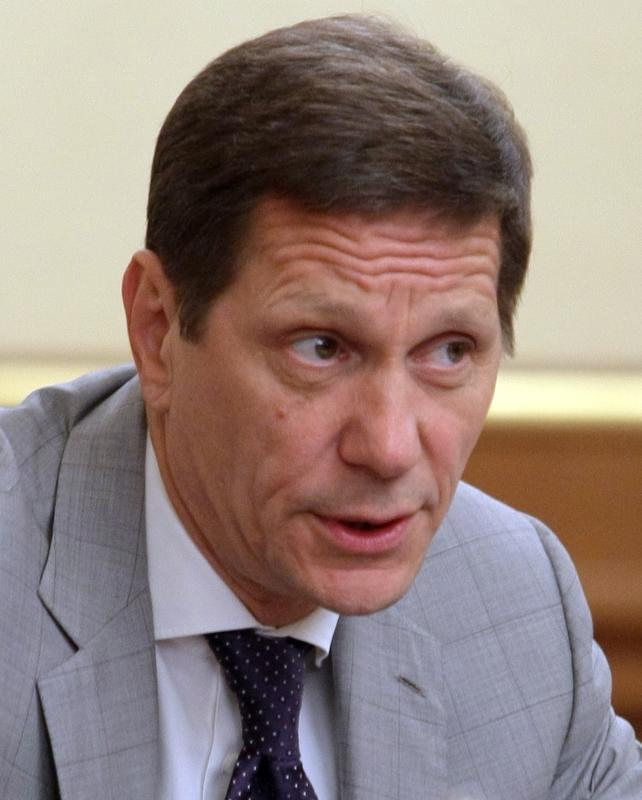
Alexander Zhukov

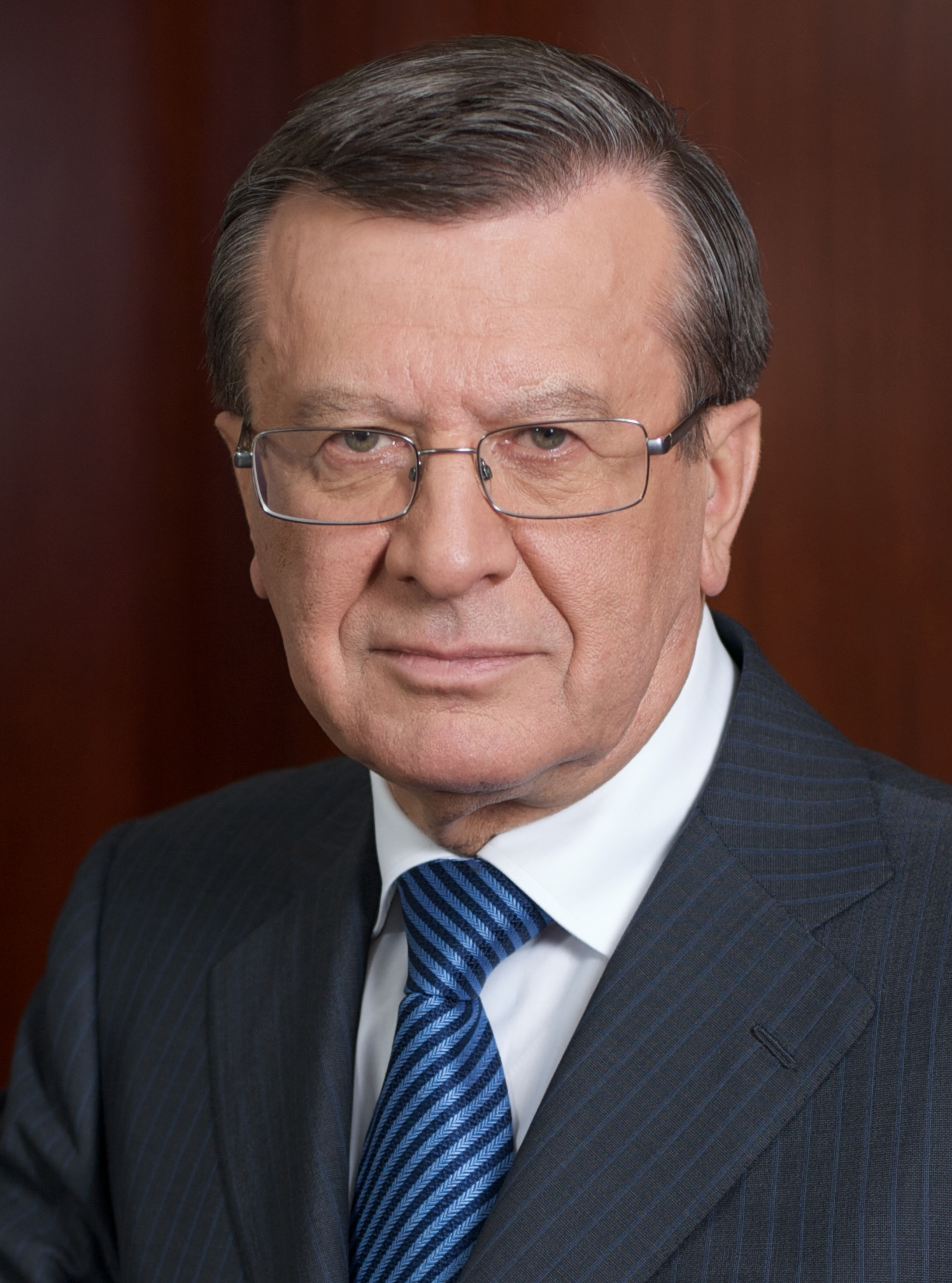
Viktor Zubkov

=== Other parties and indepenent candidates ===
- Mikhail Barshchevsky, leader of Civilian Power, representative of the Government of Russia to the supreme courts (2001–2025)
- Sergey Glazyev, 2004 candidate, deputy of the State Duma, leader of Rodina electoral alliance (2003)
- Irina Khakamada, 2004 candidate, former deputy of the State Duma
- Sergey Mironov, 2004 candidate, leader of A Just Russia party, chairman of the Federation Council (2001–2011)
- Dmitry Rogozin, permanent representative of Russia to NATO (2008–2011), former deputy of the State Duma, former leader of Rodina party (2004–2006)
- Vladimir Ryzhkov, co-leader of the Republican Party of Russia (2006–2014), former deputy of the State Duma
- Gennady Semigin, leader of Patriots of Russia, 2004 Communist Party candidate
- Grigory Yavlinsky, leader of Yabloko, who also stood for the presidency in 1996 and in 2000. He was widely expected to run for the presidency as a candidate of united liberal parties. However, at the Yabloko congress on December 14, 2007, it was announced that Yavlinsky and his party would support the candidacy of Bukovsky.

Additionally:

- A Just Russia announced on December 7, 2007 that it would not nominate a candidate and instead would support another party's candidate (likely United Russia's).
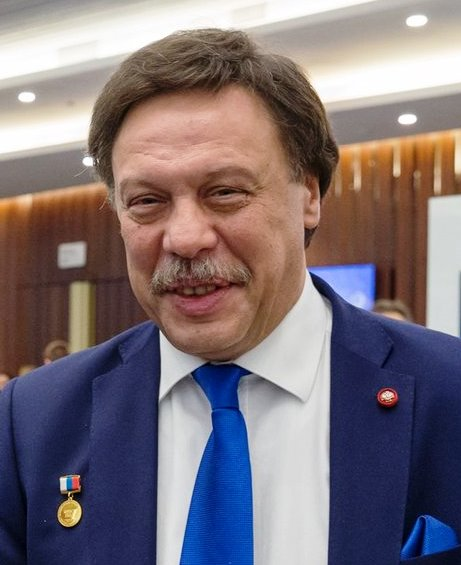
Mikhail Barshchevsky

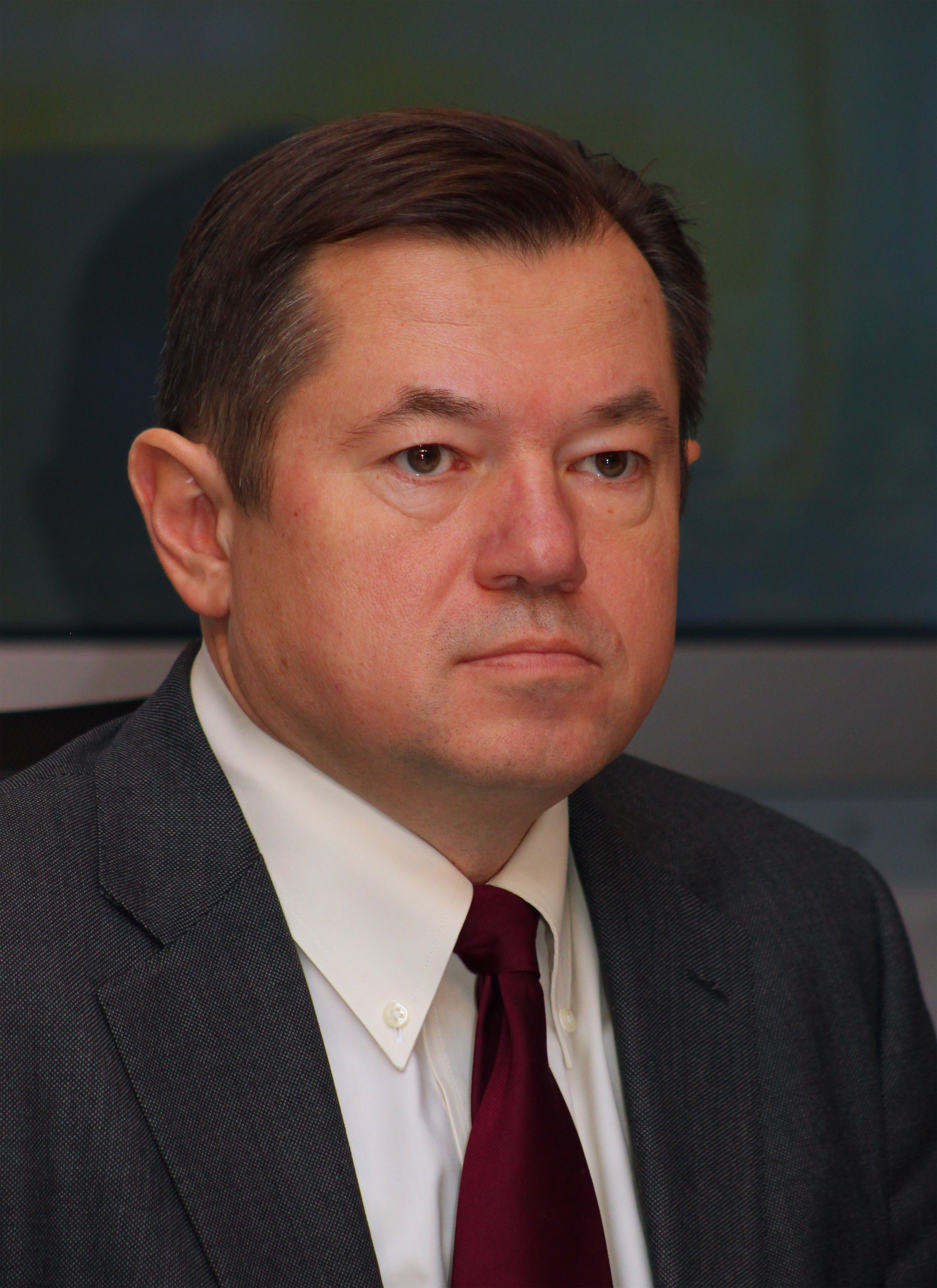
Sergey Glazyev

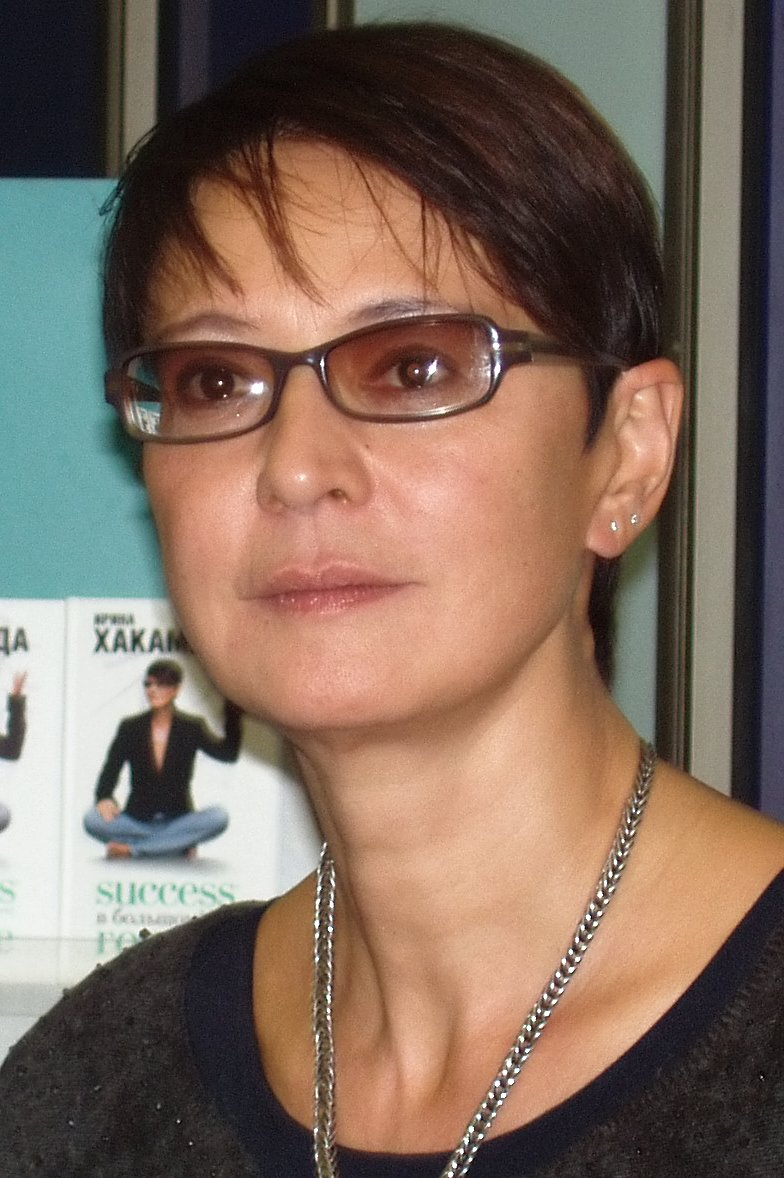
Irina Khakamada

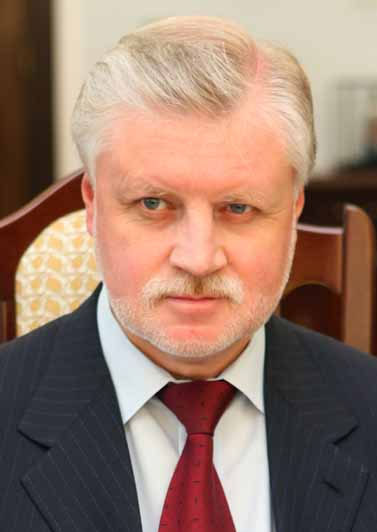
Sergey Mironov

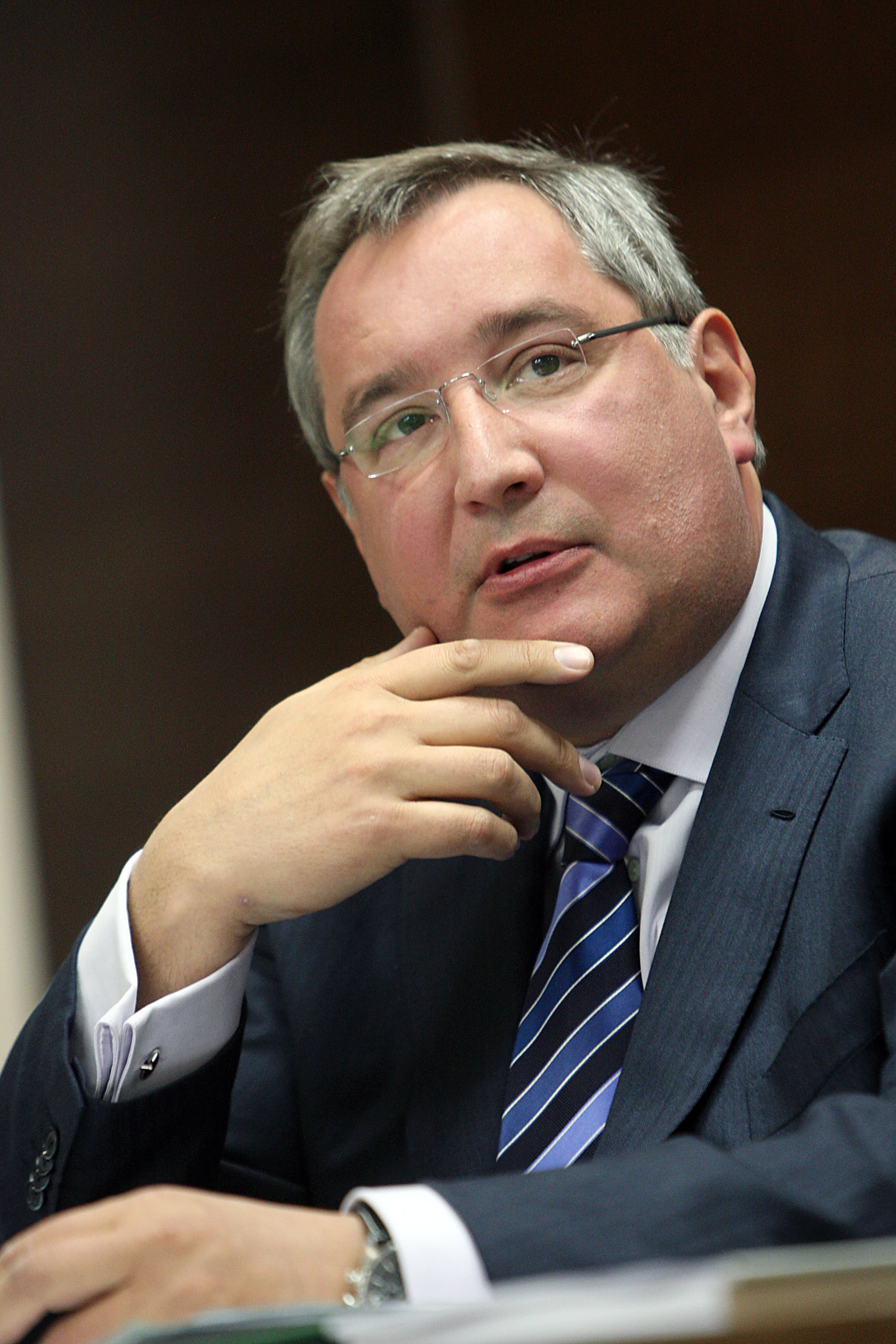
Dmitry Rogozin

Vladimir Ryzhkov

Gennady Semigin

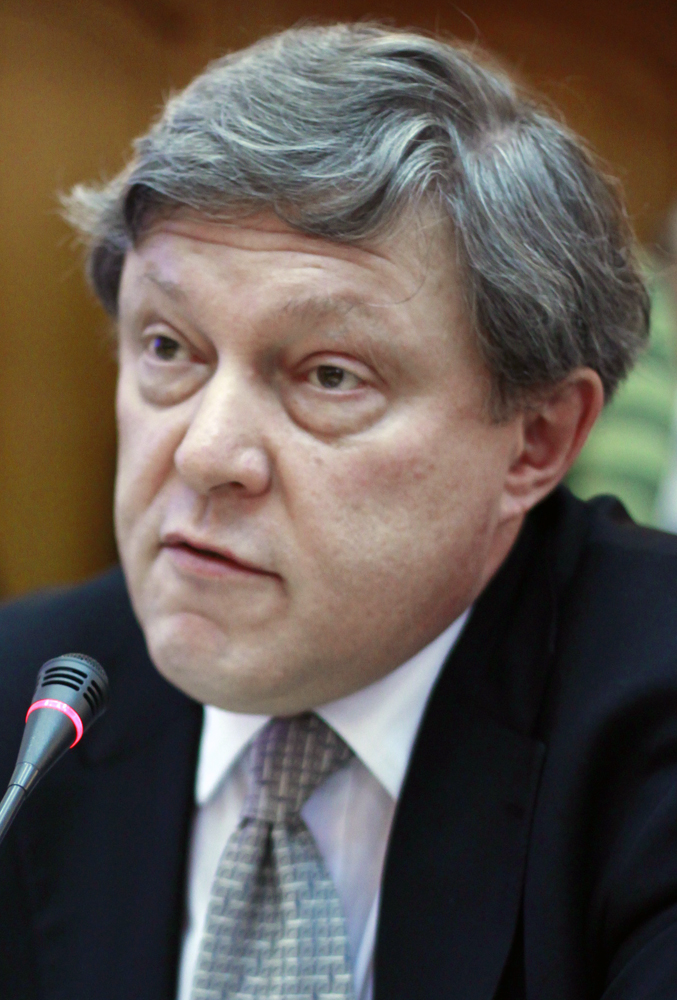
Grigory Yavlinsky
