= Opinion polling for the 2008 Russian presidential election =

Opinion polling for the Russian presidential election, 2008

This is a collection of scientific, public opinion polls that have been conducted relating to the 2008 Russian presidential election.

== First round ==
=== 2004–2006 polls ===
Polling firm	Fieldwork date													Other	Against all (Note: "Against all" line was removed from Russian election ballots in 2006.)	Undecided	Wouldn't vote
Polling firm	Fieldwork date	Medvedev UR	Ivanov UR	Gryzlov UR	Luzhkov UR	Shoigu UR	Zyuganov CPRF	Zhirinovsky LDPR	Glazyev IND	Rogozin Rodina	Kasyanov IND	Yavlinsky Yabloko	Ryzhkov RPR	Other	Against all	Undecided	Wouldn't vote
Levada	13–16 Aug 2004	—N/a	2	—N/a	—N/a	—N/a	6	9	—N/a	—N/a	—N/a	—N/a	—N/a	46	—N/a	23	15
Levada	May 2005	—N/a	—N/a	7	9	—N/a	11	9	5	7	3	—N/a	4	—N/a	13	—N/a	14
VCIOM	17–18 Sep 2005	—N/a	1	4	4	8	6	5	2	3	1	2	—N/a	15 (Note: Matviyenko, Tuleyev 3%, Zhukov 2%, Khakamada, Kozak, Mironov, Semigin 1%, Chubais, Khodorkovsky 0%, other 3%.)	9	31	6
Levada	16–19 Sep 2005	—N/a	—N/a	6	10	—N/a	10	8	4	5	2	3	2	—N/a	16	21	14
Levada	14–17 Oct 2005	—N/a	—N/a	—N/a	—N/a	—N/a	12	8	—N/a	—N/a	—N/a	—N/a	—N/a	45	—N/a	24	12
Levada	11–14 Nov 2005	—N/a	—N/a	—N/a	—N/a	—N/a	15	9	—N/a	—N/a	—N/a	—N/a	—N/a	47	—N/a	23	15
Levada	9–12 Dec 2005	—N/a	—N/a	—N/a	—N/a	—N/a	13	8	—N/a	—N/a	—N/a	—N/a	—N/a	47	—N/a	23	13
Levada	16–19 Dec 2005	—N/a	8	—N/a	—N/a	—N/a	17	9	—N/a	—N/a	—N/a	—N/a	—N/a	37	—N/a	21	17
Levada	20–24 Jan 2006	—N/a	—N/a	—N/a	10	—N/a	9	8	4	3	1	2	1	—N/a	16	25	15
Levada	20–24 Jan 2006	—N/a	25	—N/a	—N/a	—N/a	9	8	—N/a	—N/a	—N/a	—N/a	—N/a	37	—N/a	—N/a	15
Levada	10–14 Feb 2006	—N/a	25	—N/a	—N/a	—N/a	7	7	—N/a	—N/a	—N/a	—N/a	—N/a	36	—N/a	—N/a	18
Levada	10–14 Mar 2006	—N/a	7	—N/a	8	—N/a	7	8	4	3	1	3	1	—N/a	16	26	17
Levada	20–25 Apr 2006	8	23	—N/a	—N/a	—N/a	7	8	—N/a	—N/a	—N/a	—N/a	—N/a	30	—N/a	—N/a	15
Levada	Apr 2006	18	17	—N/a	—N/a	—N/a	16	18	7	5	4	4	5	—N/a	5	—N/a	—N/a
Levada	19–22 May 2006	10	25	—N/a	—N/a	—N/a	7	7	—N/a	—N/a	—N/a	—N/a	—N/a	28	—N/a	—N/a	16
Levada	10–14 Jun 2006	11	21	—N/a	—N/a	—N/a	6	10	—N/a	—N/a	—N/a	—N/a	—N/a	30	—N/a	—N/a	17
Levada	14–17 Jul 2006	12	22	—N/a	—N/a	—N/a	7	9	—N/a	—N/a	—N/a	—N/a	—N/a	26	—N/a	—N/a	16
Levada	18–21 Aug 2006	10	23	—N/a	—N/a	—N/a	8	10	—N/a	—N/a	—N/a	—N/a	—N/a	12	—N/a	—N/a	29
Levada	15–18 Sep 2006	14	27	—N/a	—N/a	—N/a	9	8	—N/a	—N/a	—N/a	—N/a	—N/a	10	—N/a	—N/a	26
Levada	13–16 Oct 2006	11	29	—N/a	—N/a	—N/a	9	10	—N/a	—N/a	—N/a	—N/a	—N/a	8	—N/a	—N/a	25
Levada	10–13 Nov 2006	14	23	—N/a	—N/a	—N/a	9	8	—N/a	—N/a	—N/a	—N/a	—N/a	9	—N/a	—N/a	28
Levada	8–12 Dec 2006	19	30	—N/a	—N/a	—N/a	5	6	—N/a	—N/a	—N/a	—N/a	—N/a	9	—N/a	—N/a	18

=== 2007 polls ===
Polling firm	Fieldwork date												Other	Undecided	Unsure	Wouldn't vote
Polling firm	Fieldwork date	Medvedev UR	Ivanov UR	Zubkov UR	Shoigu UR	Zyuganov CPRF	Zhirinovsky LDPR	Glazyev IND	Rogozin IND	Kasyanov RNDS / IND	Nemtsov IND	Bogdanov DPR	Other	Undecided	Unsure	Wouldn't vote
Levada	Jan	33	21	—N/a	—N/a	14	14	5	1	—N/a	—N/a	—N/a	11 (Note: Combined vote for the generic "liberal candidate". In different polls, the lists included: Irina Khakamada, Nikita Belykh, Mikhail Kasyanov, Vladimir Ryzhkov, Grigory Yavlinsky.)	—N/a	—N/a	—N/a
Levada	19–22 Jan	17	11	—N/a	—N/a	7	7	—N/a	—N/a	—N/a	—N/a	—N/a	10	28	8	20
Levada	Feb	32	27	—N/a	—N/a	13	13	5	2	—N/a	—N/a	—N/a	8	—N/a	—N/a	—N/a
VCIOM	3–4 Feb	22	6	—N/a	5	4	6	1	1	0	—N/a	—N/a	20 (Note: Luzhkov, Matviyenko 3%, Gryzlov, Mironov, Tuleyev 2%, Barshchevsky, Fradkov, Khakamada, Ryzhkov, Sobyanin, Yavlinsky 1%, Kozak, Semigin, Zhukov 0%, other 2%.)	24	—N/a	11
VCIOM	10–11 Feb	20	6	—N/a	5	5	5	1	1	0	—N/a	—N/a	18 (Note: Luzhkov, Matviyenko 3%, Fradkov, Gryzlov, Mironov, Tuleyev 2%, Khakamada, Sobyanin 1%, Barshchevsky, Kozak, Ryzhkov, Semigin, Yavlinsky, Zhukov 0%, other 2%.)	27	—N/a	11
	15 Feb	Sergey Ivanov appointed first deputy premier alongside Dmitry Medvedev														
VCIOM	17–18 Feb	20	10	—N/a	4	5	5	1	0	0	—N/a	—N/a	13 (Note: Matviyenko, Tuleyev 2%, Fradkov, Gryzlov, Khakamada, Luzhkov, Mironov, Ryzhkov, Sobyanin 1%, Barshchevsky, Kozak, Semigin, Yavlinsky, Zhukov 0%, other 2%.)	27	—N/a	11
Levada	16–19 Feb	19	16	—N/a	—N/a	8	8	—N/a	—N/a	—N/a	—N/a	—N/a	9	20	4	21
Levada	Mar	31	25	—N/a	—N/a	15	14	6	4	—N/a	—N/a	—N/a	8	—N/a	—N/a	—N/a
ROMIR	Mar	16	10	—N/a	8	5	9	—N/a	—N/a	1	—N/a	—N/a	27 (Note: Lavrov, Yakunin 1%, other 25%.)	8	—N/a	16
Levada	16–19 Mar	17	14	—N/a	—N/a	7	6	—N/a	—N/a	—N/a	—N/a	—N/a	8	27	8	13
Levada	Apr	29	31	—N/a	—N/a	17	11	5	2	—N/a	—N/a	—N/a	6	—N/a	—N/a	—N/a
Levada	13–16 Apr	18	18	—N/a	—N/a	9	10	—N/a	—N/a	—N/a	—N/a	—N/a	9	23	8	10
ROMIR	12–18 Apr	16	8	—N/a	9	5	8	—N/a	—N/a	1	—N/a	—N/a	31 (Note: Lavrov 1%, other 30%.)	6	—N/a	16
Levada	May	34	31	—N/a	—N/a	12	13	3	2	—N/a	—N/a	—N/a	6	—N/a	—N/a	—N/a
Levada	11–14 May	15	12	—N/a	—N/a	2	3	—N/a	—N/a	—N/a	—N/a	—N/a	9	44	6	8
Levada	Jun	27	31	—N/a	—N/a	14	14	5	2	—N/a	—N/a	—N/a	7	—N/a	—N/a	—N/a
Levada	15–18 Jun	17	19	—N/a	—N/a	9	9	—N/a	—N/a	—N/a	—N/a	—N/a	8	20	10	11
ROMIR	6–12 Jul	18	14	—N/a	—N/a	6	9	—N/a	—N/a	2	—N/a	—N/a	24 (Note: Lavrov 2%, Yakunin 1%, other 21%.)	8	—N/a	—N/a
Levada	13–16 Jul	17	22	—N/a	—N/a	8	6	—N/a	—N/a	—N/a	—N/a	—N/a	5	22	6	14
Levada	Aug	34	36	—N/a	—N/a	12	12	1	1	—N/a	—N/a	—N/a	3	—N/a	—N/a	—N/a
Levada	10–13 Aug	18	19	—N/a	—N/a	7	6	—N/a	—N/a	—N/a	—N/a	—N/a	3	23	10	14
Levada	Sep	30	34	4	—N/a	15	11	4	<1	—N/a	—N/a	—N/a	3	—N/a	—N/a	—N/a
	14 Sep	Viktor Zubkov replaces Mikhail Fradkov as prime minister														
Levada	Oct	26	25	19	—N/a	12	13	3	—N/a	—N/a	—N/a	—N/a	2	—N/a	—N/a	—N/a
Levada	12–15 Oct	5	5	—N/a	—N/a	4	2	—N/a	—N/a	—N/a	—N/a	—N/a	5	28	10	—N/a
Levada	12–15 Oct	14	14	10	—N/a	7	7	—N/a	—N/a	—N/a	—N/a	—N/a	3	26	7	11
Levada	Nov	24	25	20	—N/a	15	8	4	—N/a	—N/a	—N/a	—N/a	4	—N/a	—N/a	—N/a
Levada	9–12 Nov	13	16	11	—N/a	9	6	—N/a	—N/a	—N/a	—N/a	—N/a	4	22	9	10
	26 Nov	Presidential election set for 2 March 2008														
	2 Dec	2007 Russian legislative election: United Russia wins supermajority														
Levada	7–10 Dec	35	21	17	—N/a	11	11	—N/a	—N/a	1	1	—N/a	3 (Note: Yavlinsky 3%.)	—N/a	—N/a	—N/a
	10 Dec	Outgoing president Putin endorses Dmitry Medvedev														
FOM	15–16 Dec	32	5	2	4	5	7	—N/a	—N/a	—N/a	—N/a	—N/a	6 (Note: Mironov 2%, Gryzlov 1%, other 3%.)	28	—N/a	10
VCIOM	15–16 Dec	44.6	—N/a	—N/a	—N/a	4.6	4.8	—N/a	—N/a	0.3	0.5	<1	—N/a	30.2	—N/a	7.8
FOM	22–23 Dec	46	—N/a	—N/a	—N/a	6	7	—N/a	—N/a	1	1	—N/a	4 (Note: Bukovsky 0%, other 4%.)	25	—N/a	9
VCIOM	22–23 Dec	52.3	—N/a	—N/a	—N/a	4.1	4.8	—N/a	—N/a	0.4	0.4	0.3	—N/a	22.6	—N/a	6.8
	22 Dec	CEC denies registration for Vladimir Bukovsky, Nikolai Kuryanovich, other independents														
Levada	21–24 Dec	79	—N/a	—N/a	—N/a	9	9	—N/a	—N/a	2	<1	<1	0–3 (Note: Bukovsky, Kuryanovich, Shenin <1%.)	—N/a	—N/a	—N/a
	26 Dec	Boris Nemtsov withdraws his candidacy, endorses Kasyanov														

=== 2008 polls ===
Polling firm	Fieldwork date							Spoil	Undecided	Wouldn't vote
Polling firm	Fieldwork date	Medvedev UR	Zyuganov CPRF	Zhirinovsky LDPR	Kasyanov RNDS / IND	Nemtsov IND	Bogdanov DPR	Spoil	Undecided	Wouldn't vote
VCIOM	5–6 Jan	52.5	5.4	4.9	0.3	0.4	0.2	—N/a	21.9	5.9
VCIOM	12–13 Jan	60.4	6.1	7.5	0.9	0.8	0.2	—N/a	14.0	10.2
FOM	12–13 Jan	50	6	7	—N/a	—N/a	0	—N/a	26	10
Levada	18–21 Jan	82	9	8	<1	—N/a	<1	—N/a	—N/a	—N/a
FOM	19–20 Jan	50	6	7	—N/a	—N/a	0	0	26	9
VCIOM	26–27 Jan	63.5	5.3	5.5	0.8	—N/a	0.4	—N/a	16.8	7.8
FOM	26–27 Jan	54	5	7	—N/a	—N/a	0	1	23	10
	27 Jan	Kasyanov's candidacy rejected by the CEC								
FOM	2–3 Feb	52	7	7	—N/a	—N/a	0	1	24	9
Levada	8–11 Feb	80	11	9	—N/a	—N/a	<1	—N/a	—N/a	—N/a
FOM	9–10 Feb	49	9	8	—N/a	—N/a	1	0	22	11
VCIOM	9–10 Feb	62.1	8.3	7.1	—N/a	—N/a	0.8	—N/a	14.4	7.3
VCIOM	9–10 Feb	69.9	9.1	7.8	—N/a	—N/a	0.9	—N/a	12.3	—N/a
FOM	16–17 Feb	49.6	9.1	8.7	—N/a	—N/a	0.6	0.6	22.1	9.3
FOM	16–17 Feb	67.8	16.3	13.7	—N/a	—N/a	1.3	0.9	—N/a	—N/a
VCIOM	16–17 Feb	61.2	9.0	6.8	—N/a	—N/a	0.9	—N/a	13.9	8.2
VCIOM	16–17 Feb	70.4	10.3	7.7	—N/a	—N/a	1.0	—N/a	10.6	—N/a
FOM	23–24 Feb	50	9	8	—N/a	—N/a	0	1	22	10
FOM	23–24 Feb	70	15.8	12.4	—N/a	—N/a	0.7	—N/a	—N/a	—N/a
	24 Feb	Last day of opinion polls publication								
Election result	2 Mar	70.28	17.72	9.35	—N/a	—N/a	1.30	1.36	—N/a	—N/a

=== Polls with Vladimir Putin as a candidate ===
Polling firm	Fieldwork date						No preference	Other	Against all	Undecided	Unsure	Wouldn't vote
Polling firm	Fieldwork date	Medvedev UR	Ivanov UR	Putin (Note: Term-limited.) UR	Zyuganov CPRF	Zhirinovsky LDPR	No preference	Other	Against all	Undecided	Unsure	Wouldn't vote
Levada	13–16 Aug 2004	—N/a	—N/a	49	5	6	26	15	—N/a	8	—N/a	12
FOM	15–16 Jan 2005	—N/a	—N/a	43	3	5	—N/a	11 (Note: Kharitonov 3%, Glazyev 2%, Khakamada, Rogozin, Shoigu, Yavlinsky 1%, other 2%.)	6	—N/a	16	15
FOM	9–10 Jul 2005	—N/a	—N/a	43	4	4	—N/a	11 (Note: Glazyev, Kharitonov, Shoigu 2%, Khakamada, Rogozin, Yavlinsky 1%, other 2%.)	6	—N/a	15	16
Levada	15–18 Jul 2005	—N/a	—N/a	36	6	4	45	10	—N/a	24	8	10
Levada	19–22 Aug 2005	—N/a	—N/a	37	4	3	47	9	—N/a	23	7	13
Levada	26–29 Sep 2005	—N/a	—N/a	35	6	3	48	8	—N/a	22	11	10
Levada	14–17 Oct 2005	—N/a	—N/a	35	4	3	51	8	—N/a	30	7	8
Levada	11–14 Nov 2005	—N/a	—N/a	36	3	3	49	10	—N/a	24	9	10
Levada	20–24 Jan 2006	—N/a	0	33	3	3	53	8	—N/a	—N/a	9	31
Levada	10–14 Feb 2006	—N/a	1	34	4	3	52	7	—N/a	—N/a	9	25
Levada	10–13 Mar 2006	2	2	31	3	3	53	6	—N/a	—N/a	12	27
Levada	20–25 Apr 2006	2	—N/a	33	4	2	52	7	—N/a	—N/a	8	30
Levada	19–22 May 2006	2	2	32	4	3	50	7	—N/a	—N/a	11	27
Levada	14–17 Jul 2006	2	1	40	3	3	46	5	—N/a	—N/a	7	27
Levada	18–21 Aug 2006	2	1	40	3	4	45	6	—N/a	—N/a	9	22
Levada	15–18 Sep 2006	2	1	39	3	3	48	5	—N/a	—N/a	14	10
Levada	13–16 Oct 2006	2	1	37	5	3	50	3	—N/a	—N/a	7	29
Levada	10–13 Nov 2006	2	1	38	4	4	46	4	—N/a	—N/a	11	22
Levada	8–12 Dec 2006	3	2	36	2	2	51	4	—N/a	—N/a	10	27
Levada	19–22 Jan 2007	5	3	34	5	2	46	10	—N/a	25	8	10
Levada	16–19 Feb 2007	5	3	32	5	3	46	11	—N/a	25	5	11
Levada	16–19 Mar 2007	6	3	33	4	3	47	9	—N/a	25	9	9
Levada	13–16 Apr 2007	6	4	31	5	3	45	6	—N/a	25	11	6
Levada	11–14 May 2007	5	3	41	3	3	41	8	—N/a	25	7	8
Levada	15–18 Jun 2007	3	5	44	4	3	35	6	—N/a	19	8	6
Levada	13–16 Jul 2007	3	4	48	4	3	34	4	—N/a	18	7	8
Levada	10–13 Aug 2007	5	5	40	4	2	41	3	—N/a	22	10	7
Levada	14–17 Sep 2007	16	18	35	8	7	44	4	—N/a	27	7	7
FOM	24–25 Nov 2007	3	1	57	3	4	—N/a	5 (Note: Mironov, Shoigu, Zubkov 1%, Gryzlov 0%, other 2%)	—N/a	16	—N/a	10
FOM	27–28 Nov 2007	3	1	57	3	4	—N/a	5	—N/a	16	—N/a	10
FOM	11–12 Dec 2007	3	2	60	4	4	—N/a	7 (Note: Mironov, Shoigu 2%, Zubkov 1%, Gryzlov 0%, other 2%)	—N/a	12	—N/a	8
FOM	15–16 Dec 2007	9	2	54	4	5	—N/a	5 (Note: Shoigu 2%, Mironov, Zubkov 1%, Gryzlov 0%, other 1%.)	—N/a	12	—N/a	9
Levada	21–24 Dec 2007	55	4	24	7	7	—N/a	1–5 (Note: Zubkov 1%, Kasyanov, Mironov, Shoigu, Yavlinsky <1%.)	—N/a	—N/a	—N/a	—N/a

== Preferred United Russia candidate ==
Polling firm	Fieldwork date	Medvedev	Ivanov	Zubkov
Levada	Jan 2007	54	46	—N/a
Levada	Feb 2007	52	48	—N/a
Levada	Mar 2007	48	52	—N/a
Levada	Apr 2007	45	55	—N/a
Levada	May 2007	51	49	—N/a
Levada	Jun 2007	46	55 [sic]	—N/a
Levada	Aug 2007	46	54	—N/a
Levada	Sep 2007	41	59	—N/a
Levada	Oct 2007	47	53	—N/a
Levada	Oct 2007	—N/a	59	41
Levada	Oct 2007	56	—N/a	44
Levada	Nov 2007	47	53	—N/a
Levada	Nov 2007	—N/a	57	43
Levada	Nov 2007	57	—N/a	43
Levada	Dec 2007	56	44	—N/a
Levada	Dec 2007	—N/a	58	42
Levada	Dec 2007	63	—N/a	37

== Exit polls ==
Agency	Medvedev UR	Zyuganov CPRF	Zhirinovsky LDPR	Bogdanov DPR
FOM	67.4	19.5	10.5	1.4
VCIOM	70.1	16.8	11.4	1.7
Election result	70.3	17.7	9.3	1.3
