= Mikhail Kasyanov 2008 presidential campaign =

Mikhail Kasyanov 2008 presidential campaign was the 2008 campaign of former Russian prime minister Mikhail Kasyanov for the Russian presidency. Kasyanov campaigned as an independent candidate but was removed from the ballot by the Central Election Commission before the 2 March 2008 election.

== Campaign ==
Kasyanov first indicated his intention to run for president in 2007, positioning himself as a liberal alternative to the managed political succession orchestrated by President Vladimir Putin. On 8 December 2007, congress of the Russian People's Democratic Union formally nominated Kasyanov as a candidate for the presidency and initiated a nationwide campaign to gather the two million signatures. By mid-January 2008 Kasyanov declared the task complete and submitted his papers to the Central Election Commission (CEC).

The campaign was subsequently subjected to police raids and investigations into allegations of fraud, actions that opposition lawyers described as attempts at intimidation. While visiting Brussels on 24 January 2008, Kasyanov dismissed allegations of forged signatures as “simple propaganda” and reiterated his expectation of being registered as a candidate. On 27 January 2008, the CEC rejected his candidacy, claiming that 13.36 percents of his signatures were invalid, well above the 5 percents, the legal limit. The commission also cited incomplete paperwork from regional collectors. Kasyanov appealed, but on 5 February the Supreme Court upheld the CEC decision.

== After the campaign ==
Having exhausted legal remedies, Kasyanov urged Russians to boycott what he termed an “imitation of democracy”. Western outlets later reported historically low opposition turnout and a landslide victory for Putin's designated successor, Dmitry Medvedev. Academic and parliamentary assessments subsequently cited the exclusion of figures such as Kasyanov as evidence of Russia's tightening electoral authoritarianism.

== See also ==
- 2008 Russian presidential election
- Boris Nemtsov 2008 presidential campaign
