= Dmitry Medvedev 2008 presidential campaign =

- Campaign: 2008 Russian presidential election
- Candidate: Dmitry Medvedev; First Deputy Prime Minister of Russia (2005–2008); Kremlin Chief of Staff (2003–2005)
- Affiliation: United Russia

The 2008 presidential campaign of Dmitry Medvedev was the successful campaign of Dmitry Medvedev in the 2008 Russian presidential election.

== Background ==
Vladimir Putin was constitutionally ineligible to run for a third-consecutive term in 2008. A popular figure in Russia, speculation rested on whom Putin might tap to be his "chosen successor".

In September 2007 Putin dismissed Prime Minister Mikhail Fradkov, who had previously been speculated as a potential successor to him. He then appointed Viktor Zubkov to replace Fradkov as Prime Minister, igniting immediate speculation that Putin was grooming Zubkov to serve as his presidential successor.

On 1 October 2007, Putin announced that he would run for parliament at the head of United Russia's ticket in the 2007 legislative election.

== Campaign ==
On 10 December 2007, roughly a week after United Russia handily won the legislative election, Putin announced that his hand-picked candidate to succeed him as president would be Deputy Prime Minister Dmitry Medvedev. The following day Medvedev announced that, if elected president, he would nominate Putin to serve as his Prime Minister.

Soon after Putin tapped Medvedev as his chosen successor, the leaders of United Russia, A Just Russia, Civic Force, and the Agrarian Party of Russia all affirmed their support of Medvedev's candidacy.

Medvedev ultimately prevailed in the election facing no strong challenge.
