= Andrei Bogdanov (politician) =

Russian politician

- Андрей Богданов
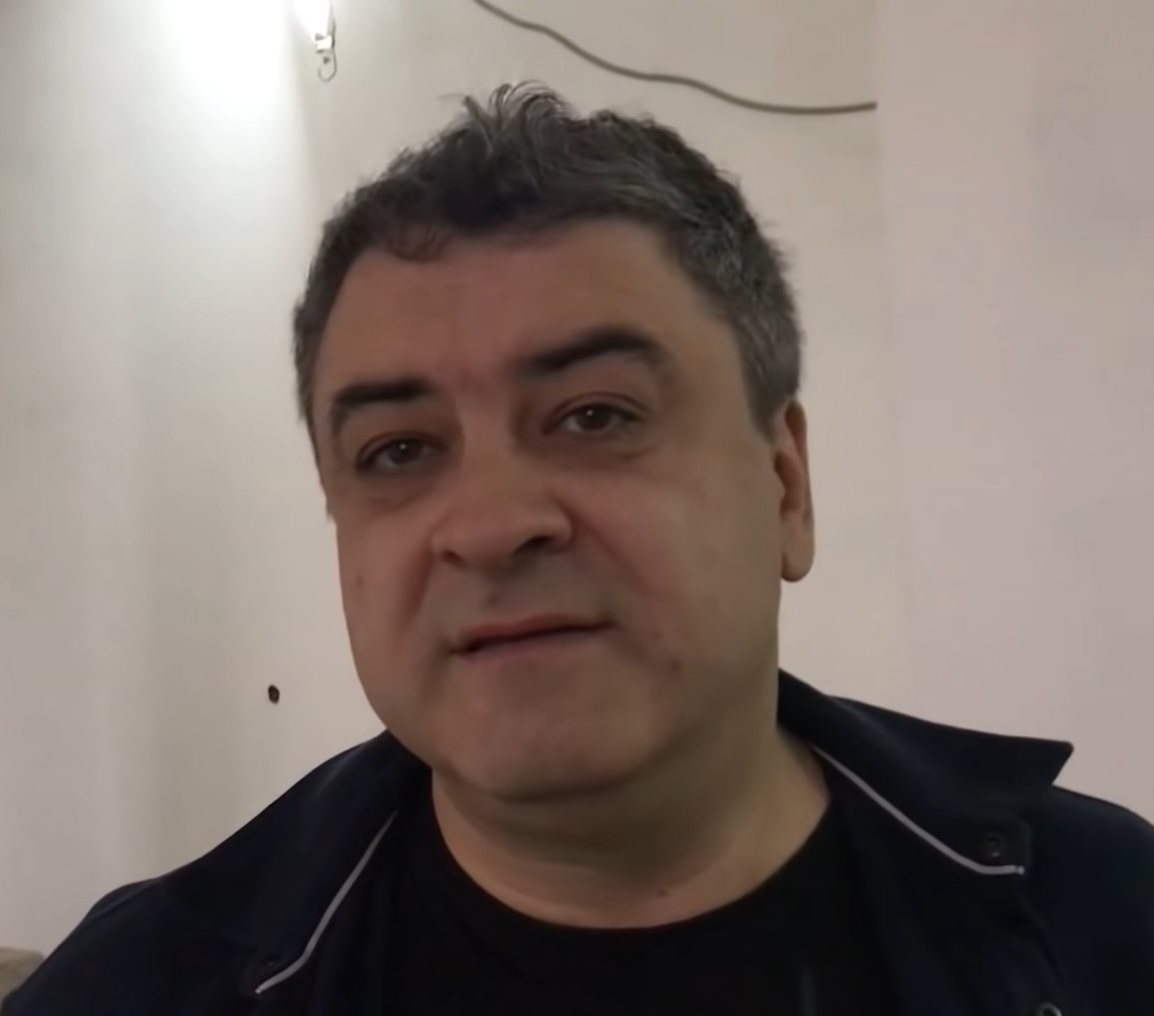
- Bogdanov in 2018

Leader of the Communist Party of Social Justice
- In office 8 April 2012 – 31 March 2021
- Preceded by: Office Established
- Succeeded by: Maksim Shevchenko

Personal details
- Born: Andrei Vladimirovich Bogdanov; 31 January 1970 (age 56) Mozhaysk, Russian SFSR, Soviet Union
- Party: Russian Party of Freedom and Justice (2014–present)
- Other political affiliations: Right Cause (2008–2012); Democratic Party of Russia (1990–2014)
- Spouse: Irina Bogdanova
- Andrey Bogdnov's voice Bogdnov on the Echo of Moscow program, 18 October 2011

Andrey Vladimirovich Bogdanov (Russian Андре́й Влади́мирович Богда́нов; born January 31, 1970) is a Russian politician. He is the chairman of the Russian Party of Freedom and Justice and a prominent Freemason, serving as Grand Master of the Grand Lodge of Russia since 2007. As a candidate for the 2008 presidential election, he received 968,344 votes or 1.30% of the Russian electorate.

== Political career ==
Bogdanov began his political career in 1990, when he joined the Democratic Party of Russia. He ascended to the leadership of the party in 2005, after he was elected at the 19th party congress.

Russian president Vladimir Putin described Bogdanov as "an ambitious young man with progressive views".

=== 2008 presidential campaign ===
Bogdanov was a presidential candidate in Russia's 2008 election.

During his campaign he showed support for Russian integration with Europe and for less state involvement in the economy.

The British newspaper Times Online articulated suspicions that Bogdanov could be a puppet candidate used by the government in an attempt to make the elections appear legitimate. Bogdanov dismissed these claims as "fantasies". Nonetheless, many serious political commentators have described Bogdanov as a decoy carefully positioned by Putin to split and distract political opposition, whilst a 2012 article published by the Institute of Modern Russia (IMR) described Bogdanov as a "well-known Kremlin shill", or confidence trickster's decoy. The IMR associates Bogdanov with more than thirty new political parties, stating "According to Kremlin operatives, the creation of dozens of new parties will confuse voters, split the opposition vote, and hand the ruling party a victory even with significantly reduced support." Other external commentators have accused Bogdanov, and his political parties, of being controlled by the Kremlin, so as to give an appearance of democracy.

=== After 2008 election ===
In November 2008, the Democratic Party of Russia was disbanded and its followers joined the ranks of the new party Right Cause, which united supporters of right-wing West-oriented Russian liberalism. At the same time Bogdanov founded the Andrei Bogdanov Centre, an independent non-profit organization for the development of social technologies, which in many respects became a successor to the Democratic Party.

Bogdanov entered the race for the mayorship of Sochi on 25 March 2009. However, he withdrew from the election on 13 April 2009, urging his supporters to vote instead for acting mayor Anatoly Pakhomov, the government-backed pro-Putin candidate.

In 2014 Bogdanov became the leader of the Communist Party of Social Justice. He had previously been the leader of the Democratic party, whose current leadership team also includes Bogdanov's son, Timur Bogdanov, according to the party's website.

=== 2018 presidential campaign ===
In September 2017, Bogdanov declared his intention to participate in the 2018 presidential election, but his candidature was cancelled after he failed to submit the necessary registration papers to the Central Election Commission of the Russian Federation.

== Freemasonry ==
On 30 June 2007, Andrei Bogdanov was elected and took office as the Grand Master of the Grand Lodge of Russia. During the election and inauguration, representatives of the United Grand Lodge of England (the world's oldest Grand Lodge) and several American Grand Lodges were present. The Grand Lodge of Russia, headed by Andrei Bogdanov, is recognized by the "Commission for the Recognition of the Conference of Grand Lodges (Grand Masters) of North America" as corresponding to "standards of recognition". Andrei Bogdanov is publicly open about his practice of Freemasonry and has given interviews in the media as the Grand Master of the GLoR.

In July 2010, Andrei Bogdanov was re-elected to the post of Grand Master of the Grand Lodge of Russia until 2015. He is a member of the 33° Scottish Rite.

In September 2010 Bogdanov was admitted to the Holy Royal Arch in the Royal Somerset House & Inverness Chapter (London) in the United Kingdom. He subsequently began establishing Royal Arch Freemasonry in Russia.

On 28 March 2015, at the GLoR annual assembly, Andrei Bogdanov was again re-elected as the Grand Master of the Grand Lodge of Russia. According to the General Regulations of the GLoR, Andrei Bogdanov will hold the post of Grand Master for a further 5 years, until 2020. At that point he will have held the office continuously for 13 years.

== Criticism ==
Bogdanov is generally considered as a political tool of the Kremlin to disunite the left-wing opposition.

== Personal life ==
Bogdanov is married to Irina Bogdanova. Their son Timur Bogdanov works with his father on several political projects. Bogdanov is a member of the Russian Orthodox Church.
