= Boris Nemtsov 2008 presidential campaign =

- Campaigned for: 2008 Russian presidential election
- Candidate: Boris Nemtsov; Deputy Prime Minister of Russia (1998); First Deputy Prime Minister of Russia (1997–1998); Governor of Nizhny Novgorod Oblast (1991–1997)
- Affiliation: Union of Right Forces
- Status: Nominated: 18 December 2007; Registered: 22 December 2007; Widthrew: 26 December 2007

The Boris Nemtsov 2008 presidential campaign was the campaign of Boris Nemtsov in the 2008 Russian presidential election.

== Campaign ==
In the preceding 2007 Russian legislative election Nemtsov's party, the Union of Right Forces, had failed to meet the prerequisite 7% of the vote necessary to earn representation in the State Duma. Nemtsov believed that the only way for the opposition to have a chance at defeating the establishment in the presidential election was for it to ultimately unite around a single candidate. He had previously unsuccessfully attempted to coalesce the opposition into a coalition during the preceding 2007 Russian legislative election. It was rumored that his Union of Right Forces might ultimately seek a coalition with Mikhail Kasyanov's Russian People's Democratic Union for the presidential election. In addition, the Union of Right Forces also sought to see the opposition coalesce behind a single candidate for the presidential election.

At a party meeting on 23 November 2007, the Union of Right Forces declared that Nemtsov would be their nominee.

In late November Nemtsov was detained at a rally protesting the legislative elections as having been unfair.

Nemtsov was formally nominated by the Union of Right Forces on 18 December 2007.

Russian television news media, both regional and national, under the influence of the Kremlin, attacked Nemtsov.

On 26 December 2007, Nemtsov withdrew his candidacy for the 2008 presidential election, saying that he did not want to draw votes away from the other candidate of the "democratic opposition", Mikhail Kasyanov. Nemtsov also had declared that he would no longer run, in part, due to his belief that the government had predetermined the election's winner.
