= Nikolai Kuryanovich =

Russian politician (born 1966)

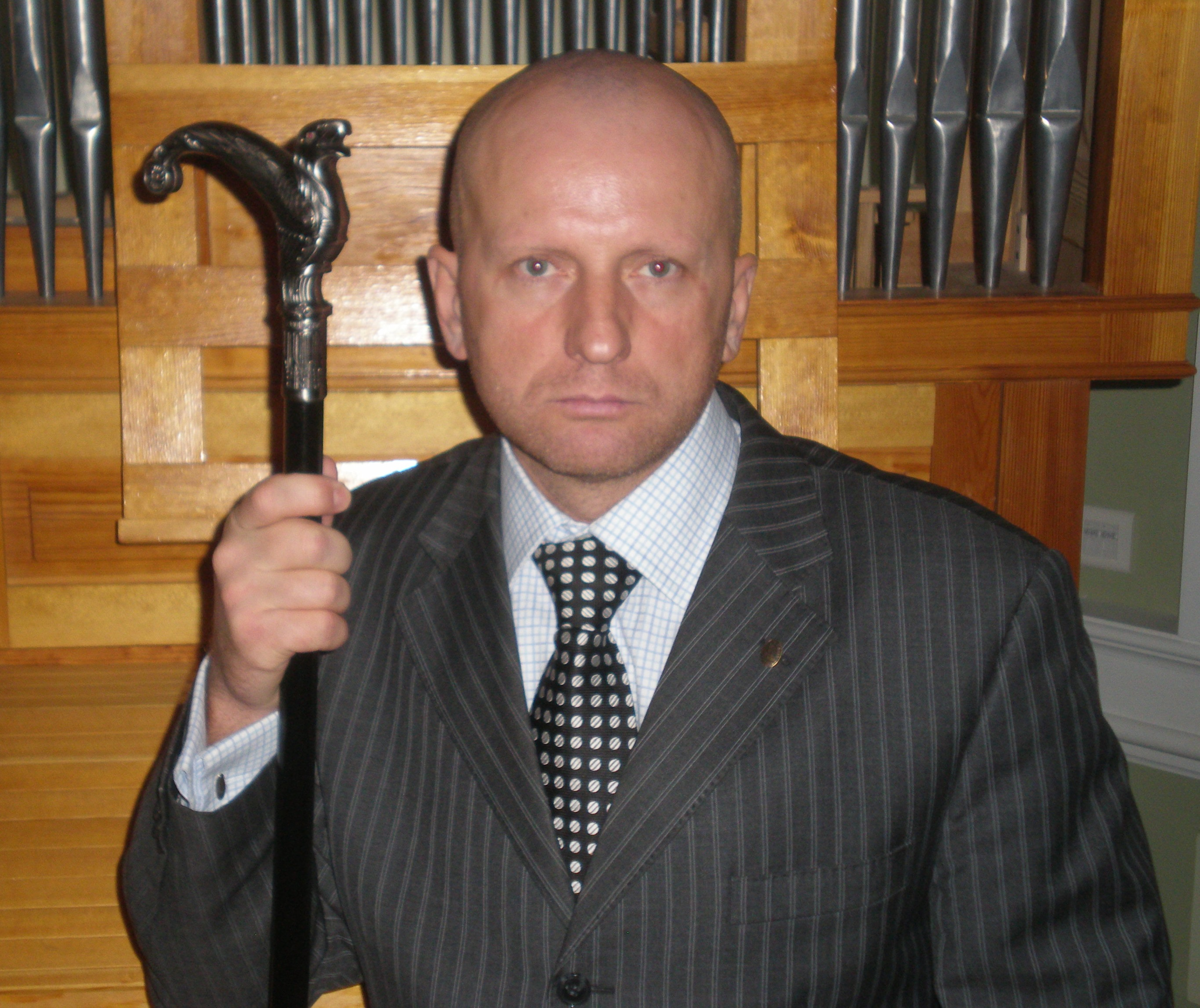
Nikolai Kuryanovich

Nikolai Vladimirovich Kuryanovich (Russian: Николай Владимирович Курьянович; 19 June 1966, Tulun, Irkutsk Oblast) - Russian politician, nationalist, Director of the Irkutsk branch of the Russian State Trade-Economic University, deputy of State Duma 4 convocation (2003-2007), member of the Central Council of the National Socialist Movement "Slavic Union".

Kuryanovich is a former member of the Liberal Democratic Party of Russia. He was expelled from the party in 2006 because of his participation in the nationalist Russian march demonstration.

== Education ==
In 1983, Kuryanovich graduated with honors from a high school in Tulun. In 1987, he graduated from the Novosibirsk Higher Military-Political Combined Arms School.

Later, in 1998 Kuryanovich got a degree in Law from the Irkutsk State University. Moreover, in 2004, he finished the Higher Academic Courses at the Military Academy of the General Staff of the Armed Forces of Russia. Finally, in 2007, Kuryanovich graduated from the Diplomatic Academy of the Ministry of Foreign Affairs of the Russian Federation.
