= 2008 Russian presidential election =

- 2 March 2008
- Opinion polls
- Registered: 107,222,016
- Turnout: 69.71% (▲5.39pp)
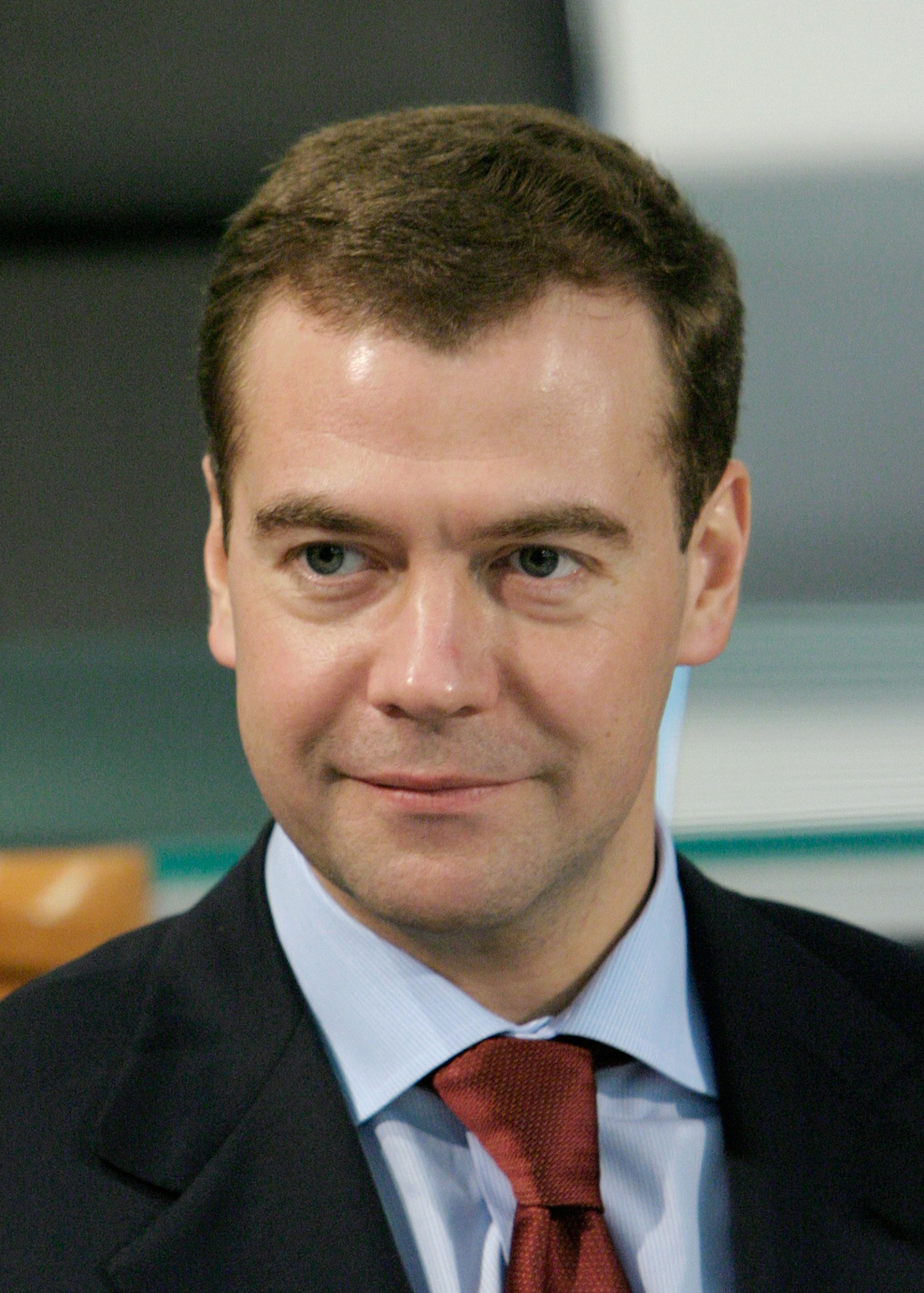

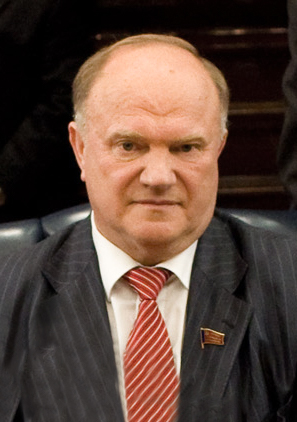

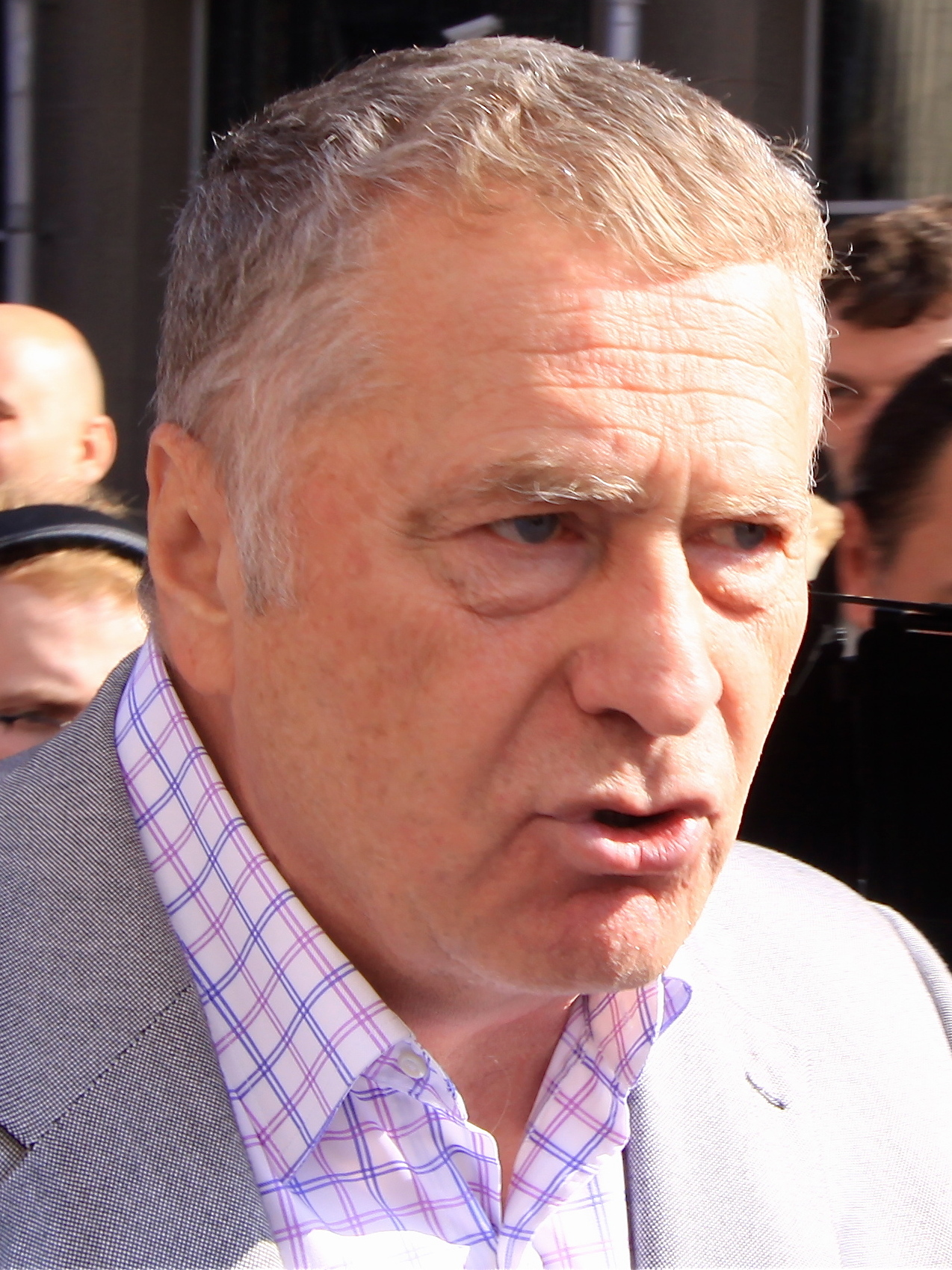
Nominee	Dmitry Medvedev	Gennady Zyuganov	Vladimir Zhirinovsky
Party	United Russia	CPRF	LDPR
Popular vote	52,530,712	13,243,550	6,988,510
Percentage	71.25%	17.96%	9.48%
- Results by federal subject Dmitry Medvedev: 55–60% 60–65% 65–70% 70–75% 75–80% 80–85% 85–90% 90–95%
President before election
Vladimir Putin
Independent
Elected President
Dmitry Medvedev
United Russia

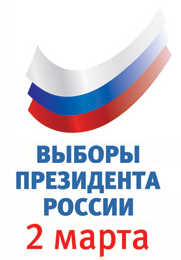
Election logo

Presidential elections were held in Russia on 2 March 2008. Incumbent president Vladimir Putin was ineligible to run for a third term. Dmitry Medvedev was elected for a four-year term with the support of Putin and five political parties (United Russia, Fair Russia, Agrarian Party, Civilian Power, and Russian Ecological Party "The Greens"), receiving 71% of the vote and defeating Gennady Zyuganov of the Communist Party of the Russian Federation, and Vladimir Zhirinovsky of the Liberal Democratic Party of Russia.

The fairness of the election was disputed, with official monitoring groups giving conflicting reports. Some reported that the election was free and fair, while others reported that not all candidates had equal media coverage and that the opposition to the Kremlin was treated unfairly. Monitoring groups found a number of other irregularities. The European election monitoring group PACE characterized the election as "neither free nor fair."

The Organization for Security and Co-operation in Europe (OSCE) election monitoring group refused to monitor the election because of what it called "severe restrictions on its observers by the Russian government", a charge Russia vehemently rejected, calling the decision "unacceptable".

== Candidates ==
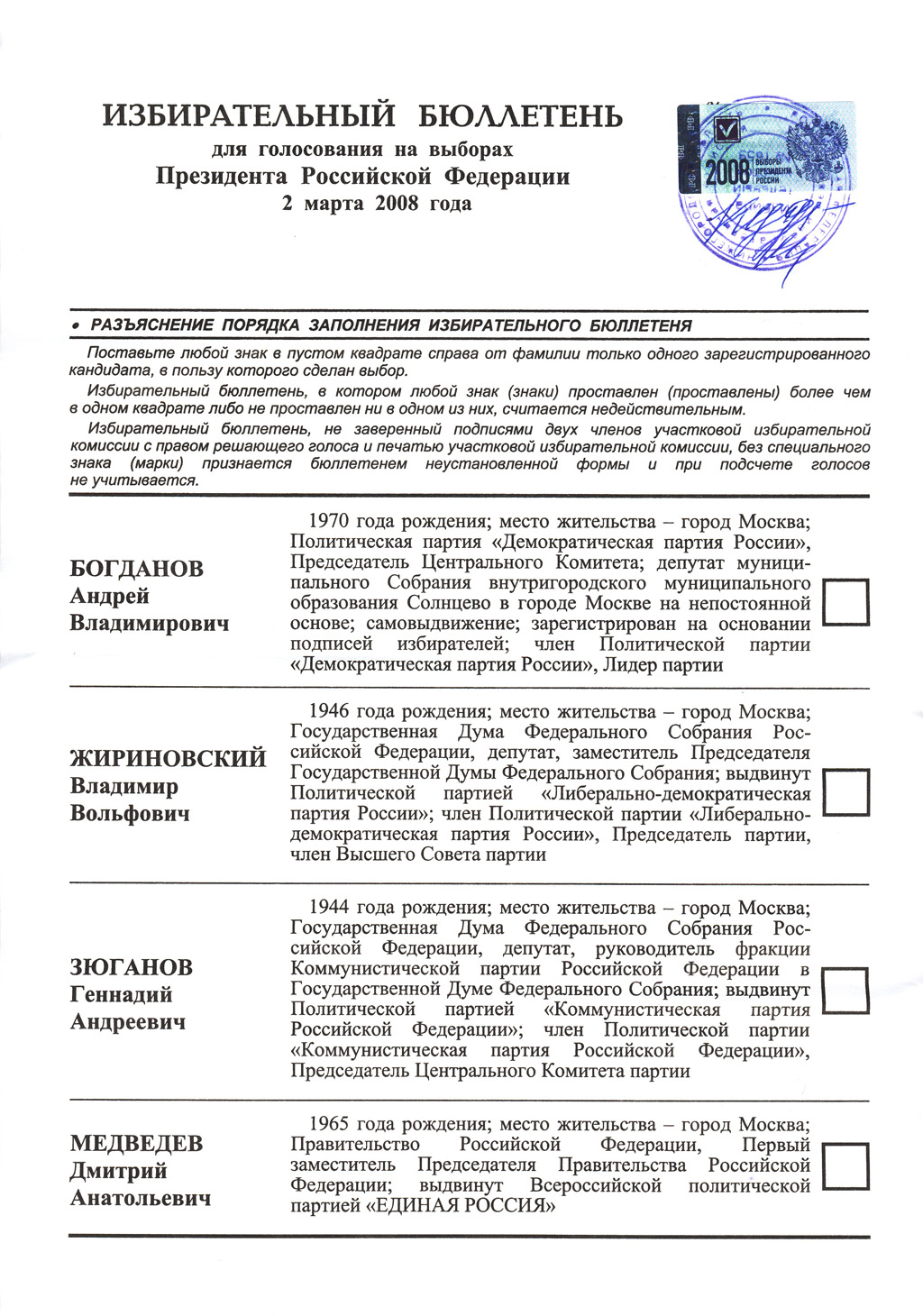
An election ballot listing the presidential candidates

=== Registered candidates ===
Candidates are listed in the order they appear on the ballot paper (alphabetical order in Russian).

Candidate name, age, political party	Political offices	Details	Registration date
Andrey Bogdanov (38); Democratic Party (campaign)	Leader of the Democratic Party (2005–2014); Grand Master of the Grand Lodge of Russia (2007–present)	Registered as a candidate on January 24. Bogdanov had an investigation opened against him for providing too many forged signatures of support for his nomination, but it was reported that even if the accusations were to be proven, his candidacy would not be dismissed. At 38, he was the youngest person to run for president in Russia, a record he would retain until 2018.	24 January 2008
Vladimir Zhirinovsky (61); Liberal Democratic Party (campaign)	Deputy of the State Duma (1993–2022); Leader of the Liberal Democratic Party (1991–2022)	Zhirinovky ran for the presidency on three prior occasions: in 1991, 1996 and 2000. His best result was third with 7.81% support. Registered as a candidate on December 26.	26 December 2007
Gennady Zyuganov (63); Communist Party (campaign)	Deputy of the State Duma (1993–present); Leader of the Communist Party (1993–present)	Zyuganov ran for president in 1996 (when he came short just a few percent of the votes) and 2000, but not in 2004. Officially nominated on December 15, 2007, with 215 of 218 votes in favor. Registered as a candidate on December 26.	26 December 2007
Dmitry Medvedev (42); United Russia (campaign)	First Deputy Prime Minister of Russia (2005–2008); Kremlin Chief of Staff (2003–2005)	Medvedev was nominated by the United Russia party, and supported by the parties A Just Russia, Agrarian Party, The Greens and Civilian Power. In addition he was supported by incumbent president Vladimir Putin.	21 January 2008

=== Withdrawn candidates ===
Candidate name, age, political party	Political offices	Details	Registration date	Date of withdrawal
Boris Nemtsov (48); Union of Right Forces (campaign)	Deputy of the State Duma (1999–2003); Deputy Prime Minister of Russia (1997–1998); Minister of Fuel and Energy of Russia (1997); Governor of Nizhny Novgorod Oblast (1991–1997)	Nemtsov was nominated by the Union of Rightist Forces on December 18, 2007 and was registered as a candidate on December 22. He withdrew his bid on December 26 and called on his supporters to vote for Mikhail Kasyanov instead.	22 December 2007	26 December 2007

== Campaign ==
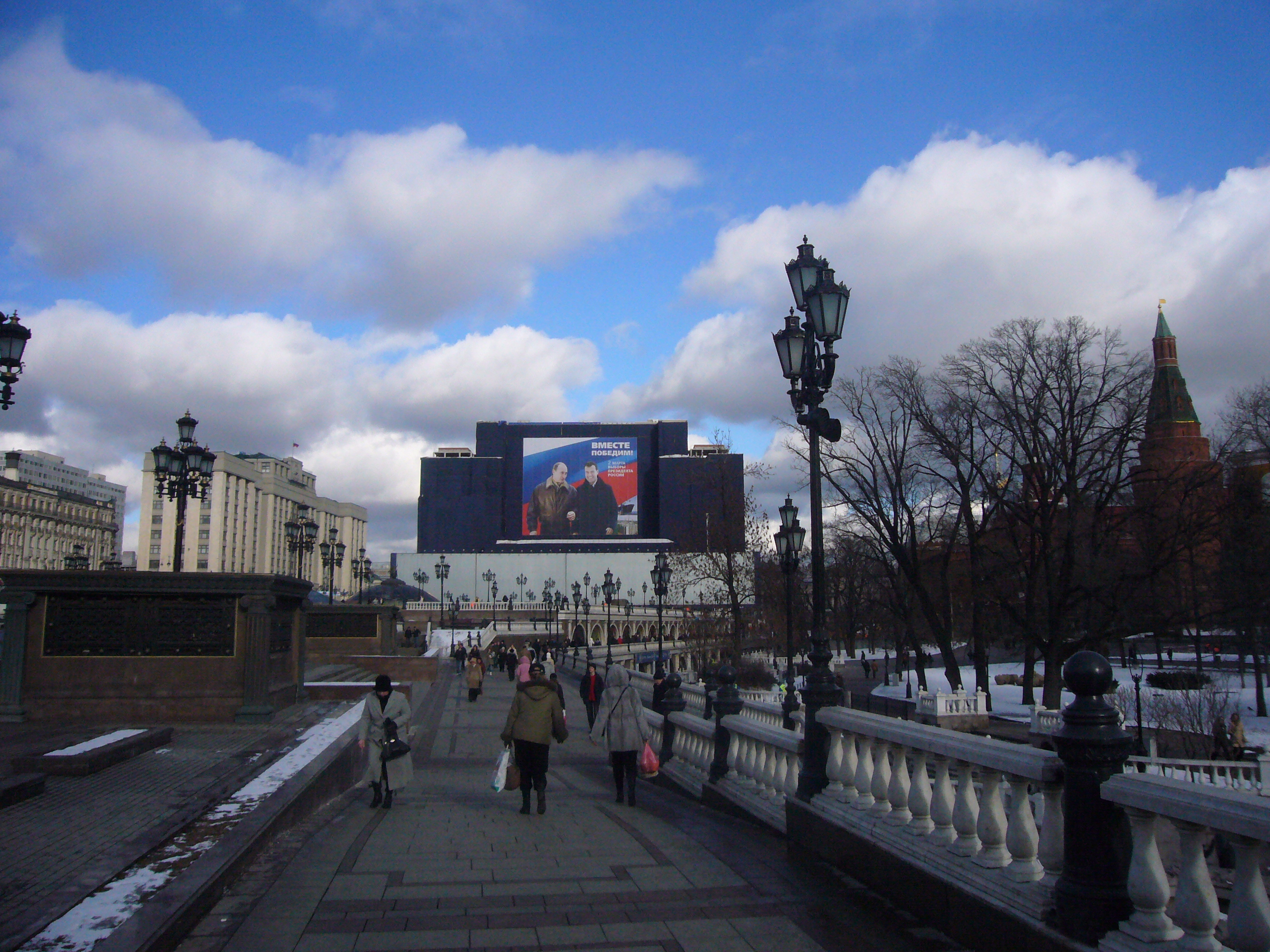
Medvedev campaign poster hanging in Moscow's Manezh Square

Following his appointment as First Deputy Prime Minister, many political observers expected Medvedev to be nominated as Putin's successor for the 2008 presidential elections. There were other potential candidates, such as Sergey Ivanov and Viktor Zubkov, but on December 10, 2007, President Putin announced that Medvedev was his preferred successor. Four parties supporting Putin also declared Medvedev to be their candidate to the post – United Russia, A Just Russia, Agrarian Party of Russia and Civilian Power. United Russia held its party congress on December 17, 2007, where by secret ballot of the delegates, Medvedev was officially endorsed as their candidate in the 2008 presidential election. He formally registered his candidacy with the Central Election Commission on December 20, 2007, and said he would step down as chairman of Gazprom, since under the current laws, the president was not permitted to hold another post. Sources close to Gazprom and Medvedev told the Vedomosti newspaper that Medvedev might be replaced by Putin at Gazprom. His registration was formally accepted as valid by the Russian Central Election Commission on January 21, 2008.

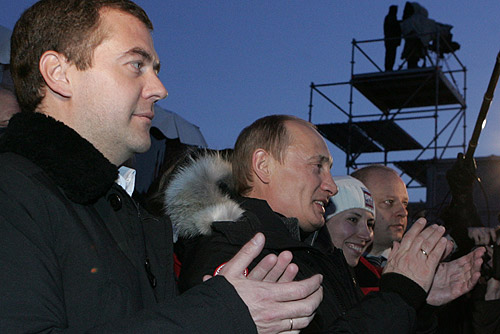
Medvedev with Putin at a campaign event

In January 2008, Medvedev launched his presidential campaign with stops in the regions. In his first speech since he was endorsed, Medvedev announced that, as president, he would appoint Vladimir Putin to the post of prime minister to head the Russian government. Although constitutionally barred from a third consecutive presidential term, such a role would allow Putin to continue as an influential figure in Russian politics Putin pledged that he would accept the position of prime minister should Medvedev be elected president. Election posters portrayed the pair side by side with the slogan "Together we will win" ("Вместе победим").

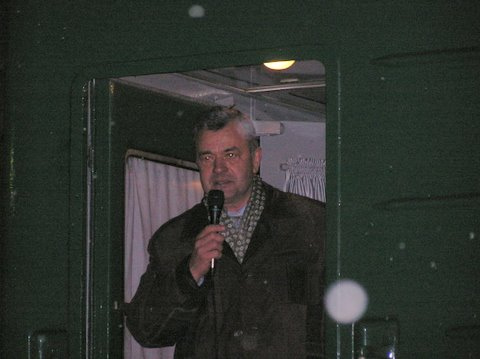
Zhirinovsky conducting a whistlestop tour

During the pre-election debates on the Star TV on February 20, Nikolai Gotsa, a representative of Bogdanov, accused Vladimir Zhirinovsky and his party of lying to and betraying their supporters. He accused them of voting in favor of government initiatives they criticize when in public. Zhirinovsky replied fiercely, insulting Gotsa and calling him a "sick man, a schizoid", "bastard", and punched him when they went off the cameras. Bogdanov and Gotsa launched a legal issue against Zhirinovsky. On February 28, in another debate, Bogdanov claimed he had a personal talk with Zhirinovsky, and that the latter had threatened his life and demanded to withdraw the issue.

== Opinion polls ==
According to opinion polls taken prior to the election, up to 82% of people said that they would vote for Dmitry Medvedev, the candidate endorsed by Vladimir Putin as his preferred successor. The second most popular candidate was Gennady Zuganov, Leader of the Communist Party of Russia, who was expected to receive between 6% and 15% of the vote. An opinion poll by the Yury Levada Analytical Center, taken in September after Vladimir Putin announced he would head the electoral list of United Russia in the 2007 parliamentary elections, showed a commanding lead for Sergei Ivanov and Dmitry Medvedev, with 34% and 30% of the vote respectively. Viktor Zubkov and Sergei Glazyev received only 4% of the vote each.

== Conduct ==
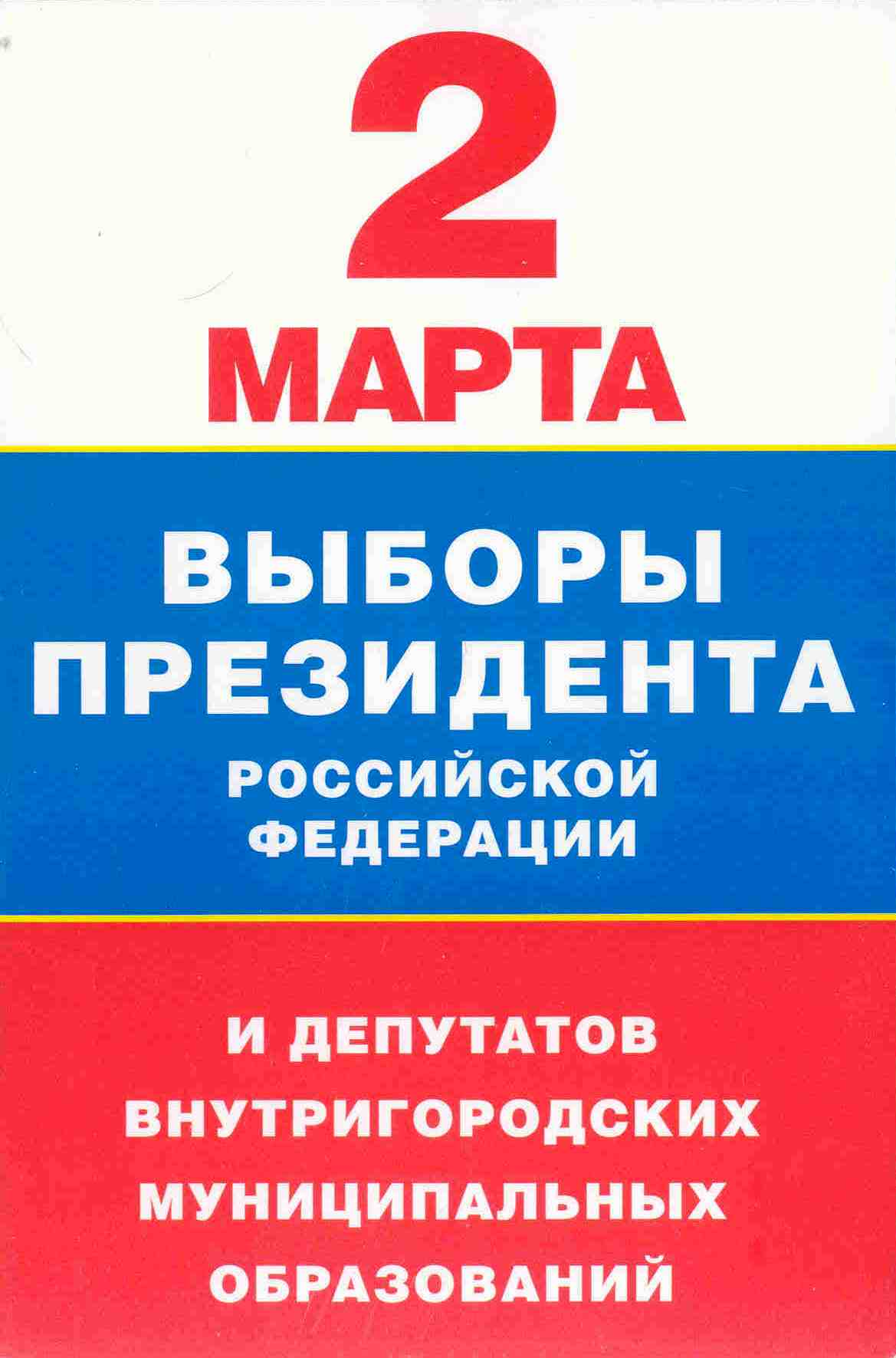
Front

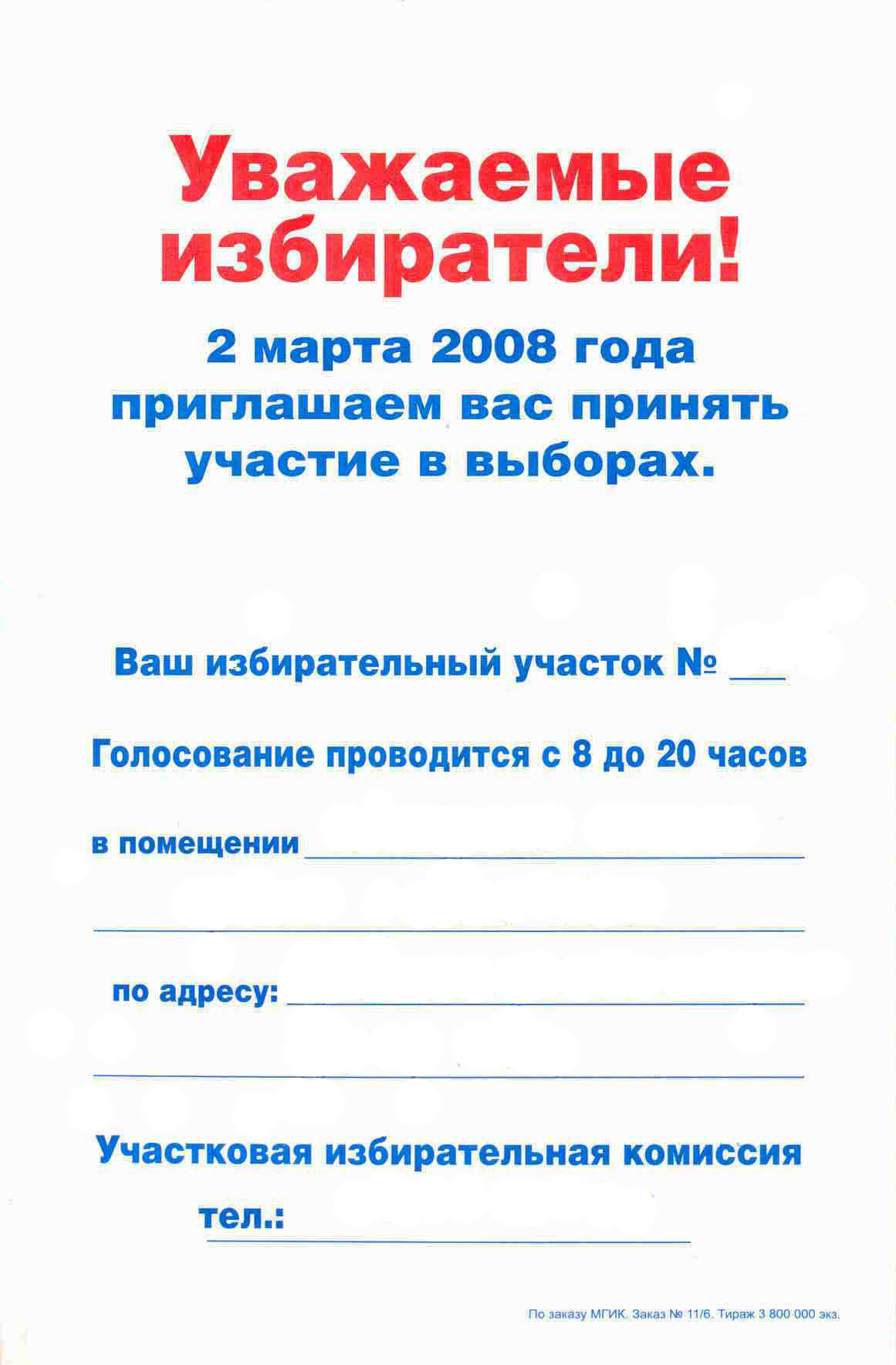
Back

Voter invitation card

The Organization for Security and Cooperation in Europe, in its capacity as an international election standards watchdog, refused to monitor the election because of what it called severe restrictions on its observers by the Russian government. After weeks of negotiations, Russia agreed to increase the observer numbers for the ODIHR mission and extend the time frame for its visit, but the ODIHR claimed that the offer still didn't meet their requirements, insisting that it needed to send at least 50 of its observers to Russia on February 15, five days before the date proposed by Moscow, in order to effectively monitor the election campaign.

Russia responded by insisting that it was complying fully with its international obligations and that its invitation for 400 monitors meets international standards. It accused the OSCE of attempting to politicize the dispute and that it suspected ODIHR's intention from the outset was to boycott the election, saying that the ODIHR had displayed "contempt for basic ethical norms ... which, it seems, indicates that ODIHR from the start was not even trying to agree on mutually acceptable conditions for monitoring."

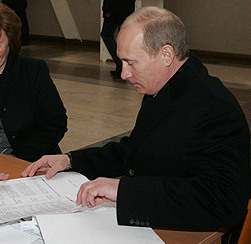
Vladimir Putin voting in the election

Russia's Foreign Ministry spokesman, Mikhail Kamynin, said "The ODIHR flatly rejected a compromise without providing any clear explanations for its position. We believe such actions are unacceptable." Kamynin added that Moscow "deeply regretted" the OSCE refusal, accusing the organization, which he said generally sends 10-20 experts to observe election campaigns one or two weeks ahead of polls, of political bias against Russia.

An incident arose during the election when three out of nine members of the Biysk Electoral Commission refused to sign the protocols citing widespread falsifications in their Priobsky Division. The rest of commission decided to approve the protocols as the alleged abuse was not reported during the election.

The European election monitoring group PACE characterized the election as "neither free nor fair."

Representatives from the GOLOS monitoring group stated that "the Election Day was held in a relatively quiet atmosphere in contrast to the State Duma election day. Such large-scale violations observed then as campaigning next to polling stations, transporting of voters, intimidation of voters and others were practically non-existent." They did however report irregularities in the election.

The Commonwealth of Independent States observer mission said the election was free, fair and in line with international standards.

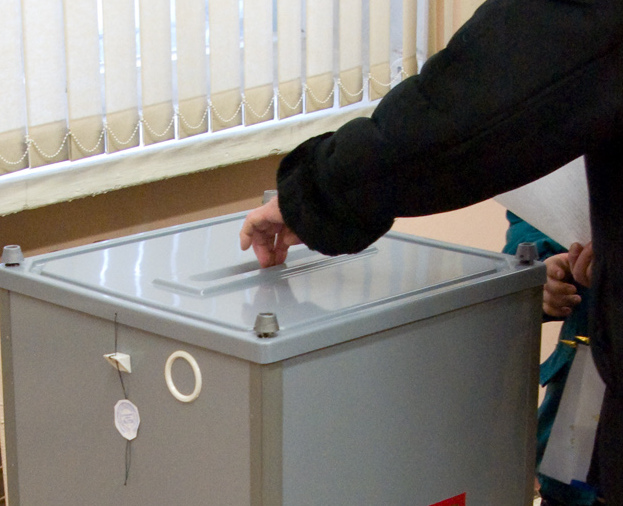
A voter places their ballot into the ballot box at a polling station

Observers from the Shanghai Cooperation Organisation said the election was free, fair and in line with international standards.

An observing group from Parliamentary Assembly of the Council of Europe stated that the result of the election was a "reflection of the will of an electorate whose democratic potential was, unfortunately, not tapped". They said "In the elections, which had more the character of a plebiscite on the last eight years in this country, the people of Russia voted for the stability and continuity associated with the incumbent President and the candidate promoted by him. The President-elect will have a solid mandate given to him by the majority of Russians."

The head of Russia's electoral commission Vladimir Churov said that media coverage for the presidential election had been "fair but not equal".

The Economist reported that Medvedev has been mentioned over six times more often than his three rivals in 1,000 different news sources, according to figures from SCAN, a media database owned by Interfax, but stated that this could be due to Medvedev's high-profile job as chairman of the state-owned gas monopoly, Gazprom.

A report by the International Herald Tribune described Medvedev's election as "the culmination of Putin's efforts to consolidate control over the government, business and the news media since taking office eight years ago."

Russian Novaya Gazeta claimed that there were forged election protocols and cases when independent observers were not allowed to monitor the election process. Journalist Victor Shenderovich claims that only 3.5% of voters came to the elections in certain North Caucasus regions according to independent observers, whereas the Central Election committee reports more than 90% turnaround.

== Results ==
Medvedev was also endorsed by Agrarian Party, Fair Russia, Russian Ecological Party - "The Greens" and Civilian Power, but was officially nominated as a United Russia candidate.

Candidate	Party	Votes	%
Dmitry Medvedev	United Russia	52,530,712	71.25
Gennady Zyuganov	Communist Party	13,243,550	17.96
Vladimir Zhirinovsky	Liberal Democratic Party	6,988,510	9.48
Andrei Bogdanov	Democratic Party	968,344	1.31
Total		73,731,116	100.00
Valid votes		73,731,116	98.64
Invalid/blank votes		1,015,533	1.36
Total votes		74,746,649	100.00
Registered voters/turnout		107,222,016	69.71
Source: CEC

=== Results by federal subject ===
Federal subject	Medvedev		Zyuganov		Zhirinovsky		Bogdanov	
Federal subject	#	%	#	%	#	%	#	%
Adygea	151,441	69.77	46,686	21.51	15,092	6.95	1,861	0.86
Altai Krai	736,578	60.35	284,159	23.28	170,214	13.95	13,930	1.14
Altai Republic	80,463	73.82	17,206	15.79	7,937	8.20	1,123	1.03
Amur Oblast	287,525	63.62	79,329	19.76	63,972	14.15	5,066	1.12
Arkhangelsk Oblast	417,355	66.98	116,981	18.77	72,472	11.63	10,475	1.68
Astrakhan Oblast	380,350	75.28	87,345	17.29	29,298	5.80	3,780	0.75
Bashkortostan	2,315,467	88.01	208,679	7.93	75,500	2.87	15,859	0.60
Belgorod Oblast	638,068	68.96	200,170	21.64	63,123	6.82	8,863	0.96
Bryansk Oblast	405,819	61.82	179,510	27.34	56,409	8.59	6,561	0.99
Buryatia	342,736	70.84	89,315	18.46	40,110	8.29	5,007	1.03
Chechnya	474,778	88.70	11,723	2.19	43,617	8.15	4,533	0.85
Chelyabinsk Oblast	1,214,028	65.63	374,066	20.22	209,106	11.30	28,443	1.54
Chukotka Autonomous Okrug	26,180	81.41	2,306	7.17	2,825	8.78	403	1.25
Chuvashia	466,170	66.48	158,270	22.57	56,021	7.99	7,064	1.01
Dagestan	1,190,974	91.92	93,873	7.24	6,351	0.49	1,975	0.15
Ingushetia	140,442	91.66	2,258	1.47	10,257	6.69	165	0.11
Ivanovo Oblast	302,963	64.92	94,049	20.15	57,263	12.27	6,877	1.47
Irkutsk Oblast	738,793	61.24	263,217	21.82	169,507	14.05	19,854	1.65
Jewish Autonomous Oblast	61,587	67.39	18,170	19.88	9,102	9.96	1,048	1.15
Kaliningrad Oblast	269,257	62.09	100,667	23.21	50,599	11.67	6,997	1.61
Kabardino-Balkaria	421,551	88.80	41,075	8.65	10,787	2.27	757	0.16
Kalmykia	102,407	71.56	31,908	22.30	5,926	4.14	1,380	0.96
Kaluga Oblast	352,446	65.54	117,318	21.82	53,235	9.90	7,494	1.39
Kamchatka Krai	106,085	69.39	22,679	14.83	19,748	12.92	2,309	1.51
Karachay-Cherkessia	252,197	90.35	22,104	7.92	3,581	1.28	523	0.19
Karelia	211,670	67.25	54,398	17.28	39,420	12.52	5,474	1.74
Kemerovo Oblast	1,212,873	70.51	145,401	8.45	258,547	15.03	47,304	2.75
Khabarovsk Krai	499,291	64.12	141,191	18.13	110,306	14.17	15,756	2.02
Khanty-Mansi Autonomous Area	528,499	66.68	114,779	14.48	126,235	15.93	12,714	1.60
Khakassia	147,208	60.47	55,469	22.79	33,750	13.86	3,614	1.47
Kirov Oblast	608,713	76.29	112,991	14.16	57,879	7.25	7,830	0.98
Komi Republic	385,447	71.74	79,451	14.79	59,601	11.09	6,770	1.26
Kostroma Oblast	226,361	62.44	82,380	22.72	45,713	12.61	4,693	1.29
Krasnodar Krai	2,332,581	75.06	522,725	16.82	185,683	5.97	25,771	0.83
Krasnoyarsk Krai	814,842	62.47	268,938	20.62	183,476	14.07	18,881	1.14
Kurgan Oblast	319,482	64.93	101,569	20.64	52,147	12.63	5,149	1.05
Kursk Oblast	407,232	64.27	138,256	21.82	74,192	11.71	6,447	1.02
Leningrad Oblast	556,250	70.19	142,098	17.93	74,662	0.42	10,651	1.34
Lipetsk Oblast	482,210	65.84	159,575	21.78	70,130	21.79	8,952	1.22
Magadan Oblast	53,870	63.07	17,168	20.10	11,841	13.86	1,304	1.53
Mari El	329,257	77.22	61,497	14.42	26,643	6.25	4,153	0.97
Mordovia	551,382	90.31	41,473	6.79	12,814	2.10	1,541	0.25
Moscow Oblast	2,654,108	70.41	678,746	18.01	320,243	8.50	54,525	1.45
Moscow	3,285,990	71.52	756,936	16.48	347,329	7.56	93,714	2.04
Murmansk Oblast	302,757	65.26	84,638	18.24	62,029	13.37	8,406	1.81
Nenets Autonomous Okrug	14,614	61.54	4,257	17.92	4,054	17.07	440	1.85
Nizhny Novgorod Oblast	1,133,124	61.84	438,282	23.92	209,801	11.45	27,096	1.48
North Ossetia-Alania	259,910	73.35	69,189	19.53	16,350	4.61	2,007	0.57
Novgorod Oblast	210,145	65.81	64,459	20.18	36,813	11.53	4,519	1.42
Novosibirsk Oblast	823,201	61.90	326,591	24.56	143,606	10.80	19,479	1.46
Omsk Oblast	803,187	63.04	278,540	21.86	154,318	12.11	19,343	1.52
Orenburg Oblast	626,850	60.81	271,126	26.30	111,290	10.80	11,259	1.09
Oryol Oblast	331,467	66.38	113,670	22.76	40,614	8.13	4,690	0.94
Penza Oblast	331,467	71.40	158,862	19.04	54,209	6.50	7,601	0.91
Perm Krai	790,268	67.30	196,124	16.70	155,391	13.23	17,752	1.51
Primorsky Krai	620,968	63.84	191,401	19.68	129,205	13.28	15,526	1.60
Pskov Oblast	280,085	70.16	81,144	20.32	30,197	7.56	3,618	0.91
Rostov Oblast	1,772,595	76.94	351,889	15.27	141,353	6.14	19,685	0.85
Ryazan Oblast	364,460	60.82	145,207	24.23	72,123	12.04	8,653	1.44
Saint Petersburg	1,652,529	72.27	383,495	16.77	167,868	7.34	42,555	1.86
Sakha Republic	302,060	67.78	91,503	20.53	37,743	8.47	7,701	1.73
Samara Oblast	933,605	64.08	329,681	22.63	157,237	10.79	18,629	1.28
Saratov Oblast	1,110,004	75.62	237,553	16.25	91,094	6.21	12,055	0.82
Sakhalin Oblast	141,315	63.52	47,300	21.26	27,235	12.24	3,761	1.69
Sverdlovsk Oblast	1,432,010	68.98	273,629	13.18	302,887	14.59	34,588	1.67
Smolensk Oblast	319,842	59.26	132,427	24.54	71,817	13.31	7,497	1.39
Stavropol Krai	827,517	64.79	295,813	23.16	127,003	9.94	13,297	1.04
Tambov Oblast	483,117	72.51	128,765	19.33	35,877	5.38	5,104	0.77
Tatarstan	1,867,921	79.24	304,789	12.93	130,820	5.55	28,975	1.23
Tomsk Oblast	297,048	64.12	88,744	19.16	61,322	13.24	8,933	1.93
Tula Oblast	585,958	67.80	177,133	20.49	77,382	8.95	10,140	1.17
Tuva	118,091	89.32	7,638	5.78	4,174	3.16	772	0.58
Tver Oblast	519,380	67.57	147,434	19.18	83,234	10.83	9,911	1.29
Tyumen Oblast	676,848	78.88	80,885	9.43	80,995	9.44	10,063	1.17
Udmurtia	551,026	70.46	126,537	16.18	84,527	10.81	10,913	1.40
Ulyanovsk Oblast	443,115	66.93	141,326	21.35	60,690	9.17	8,059	1.22
Vladimir Oblast	433,585	64.05	147,833	21.84	78,084	11.53	9,557	1.41
Volgograd Oblast	743,775	62.27	289,613	24.25	135,793	11.37	13,235	1.11
Vologda Oblast	451,220	68.54	105,319	16.02	84,554	12.86	9,622	1.46
Voronezh Oblast	886,362	66.27	301,963	22.58	119,728	8.95	12,642	0.95
Yamalo-Nenets Autonomous Okrug	268,755	83.86	23,174	7.23	23,686	7.39	2,780	0.87
Yaroslavl Oblast	404,566	63.58	131,368	20.64	79,769	12.54	10,221	1.61
Zabaykalsky Krai	375,407	65.81	98,958	17.35	84,151	14.75	5,801	1.02
Other
Baikonur (Kazakhstan)	10,049	79.22	1,255	9.89	1,129	8.90	133	1.05
Expatriate voting	283,298	85.80	24,932	7.55	14,695	4.45	3,736	1.13
Source: CEC

=== Reactions ===
According to Russia Today, many in the Western media portrayed Russia's presidential election as nothing but a farce. It reported that the claims of rigging the election were not supported by the various international election monitoring organizations in attendance.

Political analyst and United Russia member, Sergei Markov, said that the outcome of this poll was predetermined because of how much support the Russian people show for Vladimir Putin's policies. "The Russian people have seen how successful these policies have been, and they want them to continue", he says. Markov cited fears that the West would interfere and change the course of the election, like they did in Ukraine and Georgia.

== See also ==
- Bald–hairy
