= Viktor Zubkov =

Prime Minister of Russia from 2007 to 2008

- Виктор Зубков
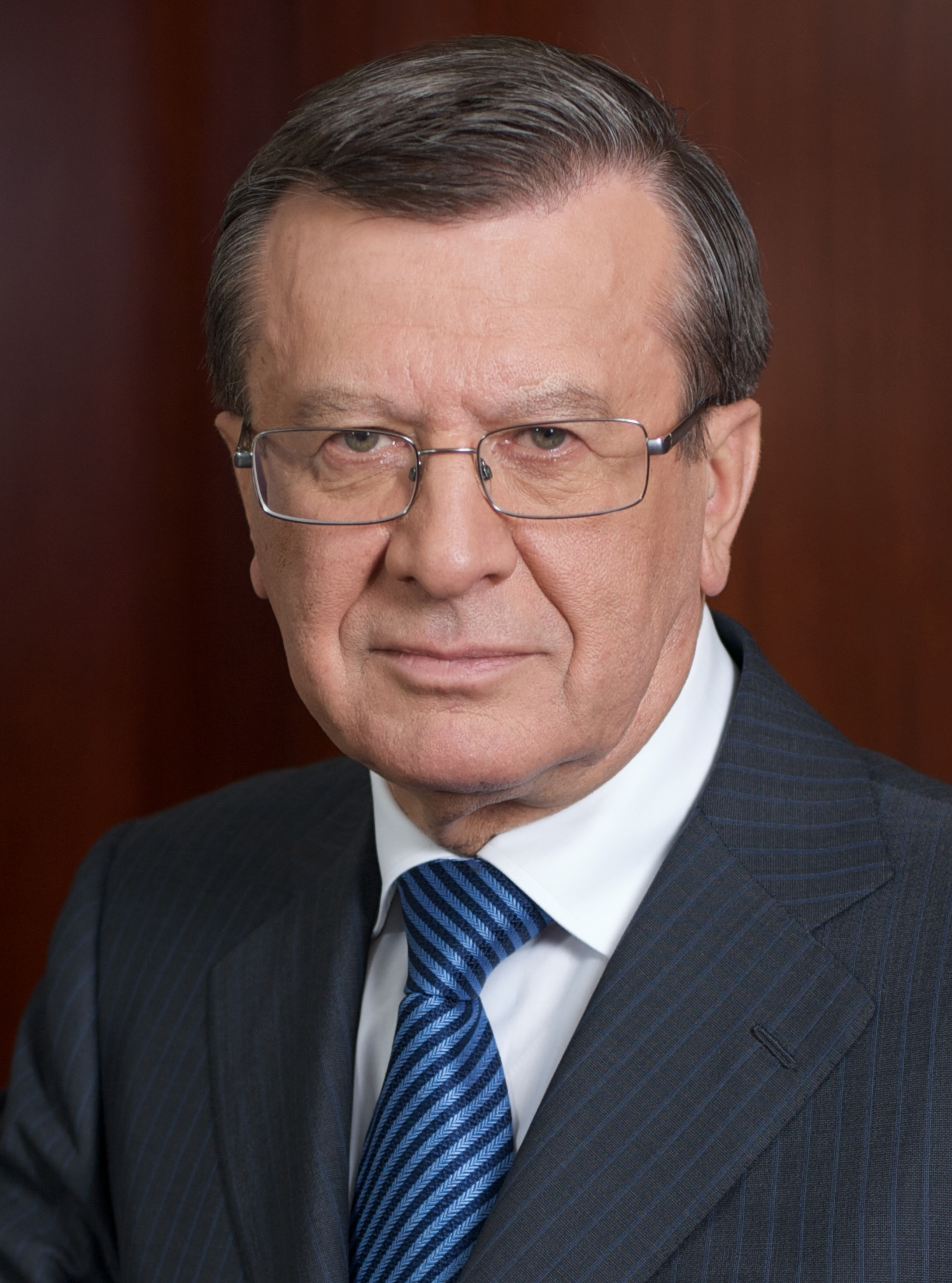
- Official portrait, 2010

Prime Minister of Russia
- Acting; 7 May 2012 – 8 May 2012
- President: Vladimir Putin
- Preceded by: Vladimir Putin
- Succeeded by: Dmitry Medvedev
- In office 14 September 2007 – 8 May 2008
- President: Vladimir Putin; Dmitry Medvedev
- Deputy: Igor Shuvalov
- Preceded by: Mikhail Fradkov
- Succeeded by: Vladimir Putin

First Deputy Prime Minister of Russia
- In office 12 May 2008 – 21 May 2012 Serving with Igor Shuvalov
- Prime Minister: Vladimir Putin; Himself (acting); Dmitry Medvedev
- Preceded by: Dmitry Medvedev; Sergei Ivanov
- Succeeded by: Igor Shuvalov

Chairman of the Council of Ministers of the Union State
- In office 15 October 2007 – 27 May 2008
- Preceded by: Mikhail Fradkov
- Succeeded by: Vladimir Putin

Personal details
- Born: Viktor Alekseyevich Zubkov; 15 September 1941 (age 85) Kushva, Russian SFSR, Soviet Union
- Party: Communist Party of the Soviet Union (1966–1991); Independent (1991–1995); Our Home – Russia (1995–2001); United Russia (2001–present)
- Spouse: Zoe Zubkova
- Children: Julia Serdyukova
- Occupation: Politician, businessman
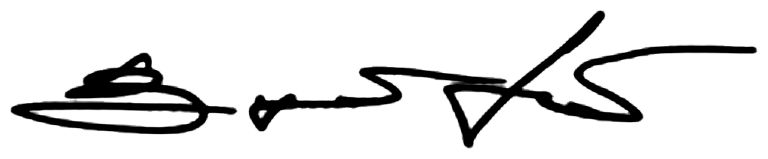
- Signature

Viktor Alekseyevich Zubkov (Note: In this name that follows East Slavic naming customs, the patronymic is Alekseyevich and the family name is Zubkov.) (Russian: Виктор Алексеевич Зубков, IPA: [ˈvʲiktər ɐlʲɪkˈsʲejɪvʲɪdʑ zʊpˈkof]; born 15 September 1941) is a Russian civil servant, politician and businessman who served as the 36th Prime Minister of Russia from September 2007 to May 2008. He was Vladimir Putin's First Deputy Prime Minister during the presidency of Dmitry Medvedev.

A civil servant who held various positions in the Leningrad Oblast under the Soviet regime, he later served as advisor to Cabinet Ministers. Zubkov was a financial crime investigator until he was nominated on 12 September 2007 by President Vladimir Putin to replace Prime Minister Mikhail Fradkov, who had resigned earlier that day. The nomination was approved in the Duma on 14 September 2007. On 7 May 2008 Zubkov's cabinet was automatically dismissed. This procedure, following an inauguration of the President of Russia is required by the Russian Constitution. After Putin became prime minister, Zubkov was appointed First Deputy Prime Minister of Russia.

He has the federal state civilian service rank of 1st class Active State Councillor of the Russian Federation.

Now in his 80's Zubkov is still the current chairman of the board of directors of Gazprom, Russia's largest corporation and one of the largest oil and natural gas companies in the world.

== Life and career ==
Born in Sverdlovsk Oblast, Zubkov graduated from the Economic Department of the Leningrad Agriculture Institute in 1972.

In 1966, he was drafted to the Soviet Army for an 18-month term. From 1967 to 1985, he worked on leading positions in kolkhozes of Leningrad Oblast. From 1985 to 1991, he occupied several leading positions in the Communist Party of the Soviet Union in Leningrad Oblast: Chairman of the Priozersk City Executive Committee, First Secretary of the Priozersk City Committee of the Communist Party of the Soviet Union, and head of the Department of Agriculture and Food Industry and the Agricultural Department of the Regional Committee of the CPSU. He was also First Deputy Chairman of the Leningrad Oblast Executive Committee from 1989 to 1991.

From January 1992 to November 1993, he was a deputy Chairman of the External Relations Committee of the Saint Petersburg Mayor Office led by Vladimir Putin. From 3 November 1993 to 30 November 1998, Zubkov was the Chief of the Saint Petersburg Department of the State Tax Inspection and simultaneously a Deputy Chairman of the State Tax Inspection for Saint Petersburg.

In December 1998, during the term of Yevgeny Primakov's Cabinet the State Tax Inspection was reorganized into the Tax Ministry of Russia and Zubkov's deputy head position was abolished, but he was immediately reappointed Chief of the Saint Petersburg Directorate of the Tax Ministry. On 23 July 1999, Zubkov was appointed Deputy Tax Minister of Russia for the Northwestern region. In a few days he was also appointed Chief of the Saint Petersburg and Leningrad Oblast Directorate of the Tax Ministry.

On 12 August 1999, he was registered as a contender in the Leningrad Oblast governor election, assisted by Boris Gryzlov as his election campaign manager, but lost the election to Valeriy Serdyukov on 19 September 1999, with 8.64 percent of the vote (4th place out of 16).

On 5 November 2001, he left his positions in the Tax Ministry and was appointed First Deputy Finance Minister of Russia and Chairman of the Financial Monitoring Committee of the ministry, aimed to fight money laundering.

On 16 March 2004, after the dismissal of Mikhail Kasyanov's Cabinet, the Financial Monitoring Committee was renamed to Federal Financial Monitoring Service of the Finance Ministry, but Zubkov retained his position in Mikhail Fradkov's First Cabinet and Mikhail Fradkov's Second Cabinet.

In a 2006 survey of political experts, Zubkov was ranked as Russia's 84th most influential politician.

Zubkov's daughter is married to Anatoly Serdyukov, the former Russian Defense Minister.

=== Prime minister ===
On 12 September 2007, President Vladimir Putin proposed his candidacy for the post of prime minister and on 14 September, the State Duma approved him in the post (he was voted 381 MP). Zubkov resigned 8 May 2008, after Dmitry Medvedev became president.

Some Kremlinologists viewed Zubkov as one more technical prime minister, interpreting the move as a way to renew a competition between possible successors. Another theory suggested that Putin chose a man of unquestioning loyalty to help him control powerful factions jostling for position inside the Kremlin. Another clue to his usefulness lies in Zubkov's experience under Putin as the man leading the fight against financial crime. Putin said that there were five people who can run for president and can be elected, including Zubkov. On 13 September, Zubkov himself said he might run for President of Russia in 2008. However, in December 2007, Putin officially gave his support to Dmitry Medvedev for the 2008 presidential election, effectively dashing Zubkov's hopes for the presidency. After Medvedev took office, Zubkov succeeded him as Chairman of Gazprom.

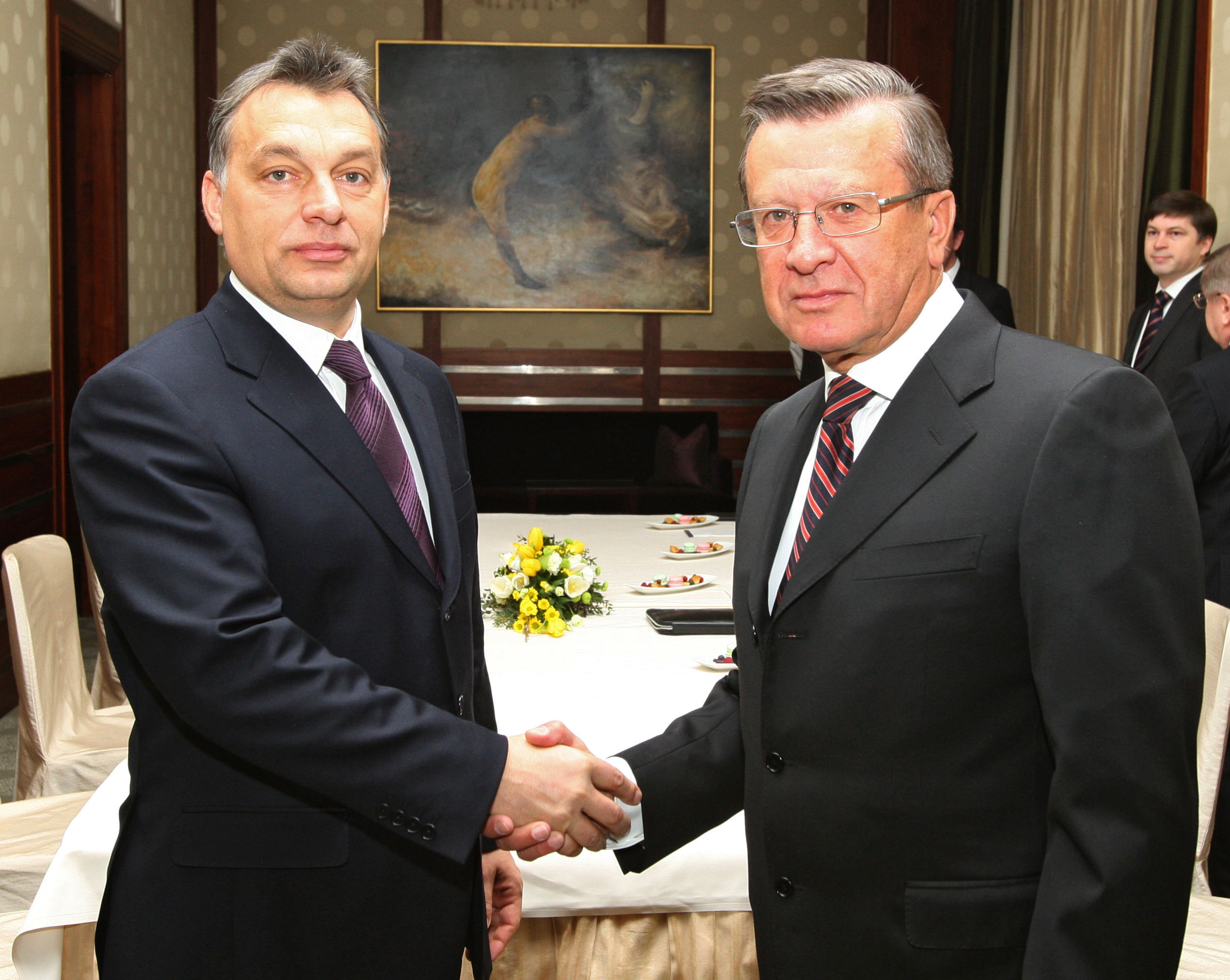
With Viktor Orban in 2010

=== Sanction ===
He was sanctioned by the UK government on 24 February 2023 in relation to the Russo-Ukrainian War.

== Honours and awards ==
- Order "For Merit to the Fatherland"
  - 1st class
  - 2nd class (19 September 2008) - for his great personal contribution to the economic policy of the state and many years of fruitful activity
  - 3rd class (9 May 2006) - for outstanding contribution to protecting the economic interests of the Russian Federation and many years of diligent work
  - 4th class (11 April 2000) - for services to the state and a major contribution to the implementation of economic reforms
- Ceremonial dagger
- Order of the Red Banner of Labour (1981)
- Order of the Badge of Honour (1975)
- Medal "Veteran of Labour" (1986)
- Honored Economist of the Russian Federation (16 September 2001) - for services in the field of economics and finance
- Diploma of the Government of the Russian Federation (1998)
- Honorary Citizen of the Leningrad Region (2009)
- Order of Holy Prince Daniel of Moscow, 1st class (Russian Orthodox Church, 2011)

== Notes ==
Government offices
New creation	Head of Committee for Financial Monitoring; 2001–2007	Succeeded by Oleg Markov as Head of Rosfinmonitoring
Political offices
Preceded by Mikhail Fradkov	Prime Minister of Russia; 2007–2008	Succeeded by Vladimir Putin
Preceded by Dmitry Medvedev	Deputy Prime Minister of Russia; 2008–2012; Served alongside: Igor Shuvalov	Succeeded by Igor Shuvalov
Preceded by Sergei Ivanov	Deputy Prime Minister of Russia; 2008–2012; Served alongside: Igor Shuvalov	Succeeded by Igor Shuvalov
