= Gennady Fadeyev =

Russian railway executive

- Геннадий Фадеев
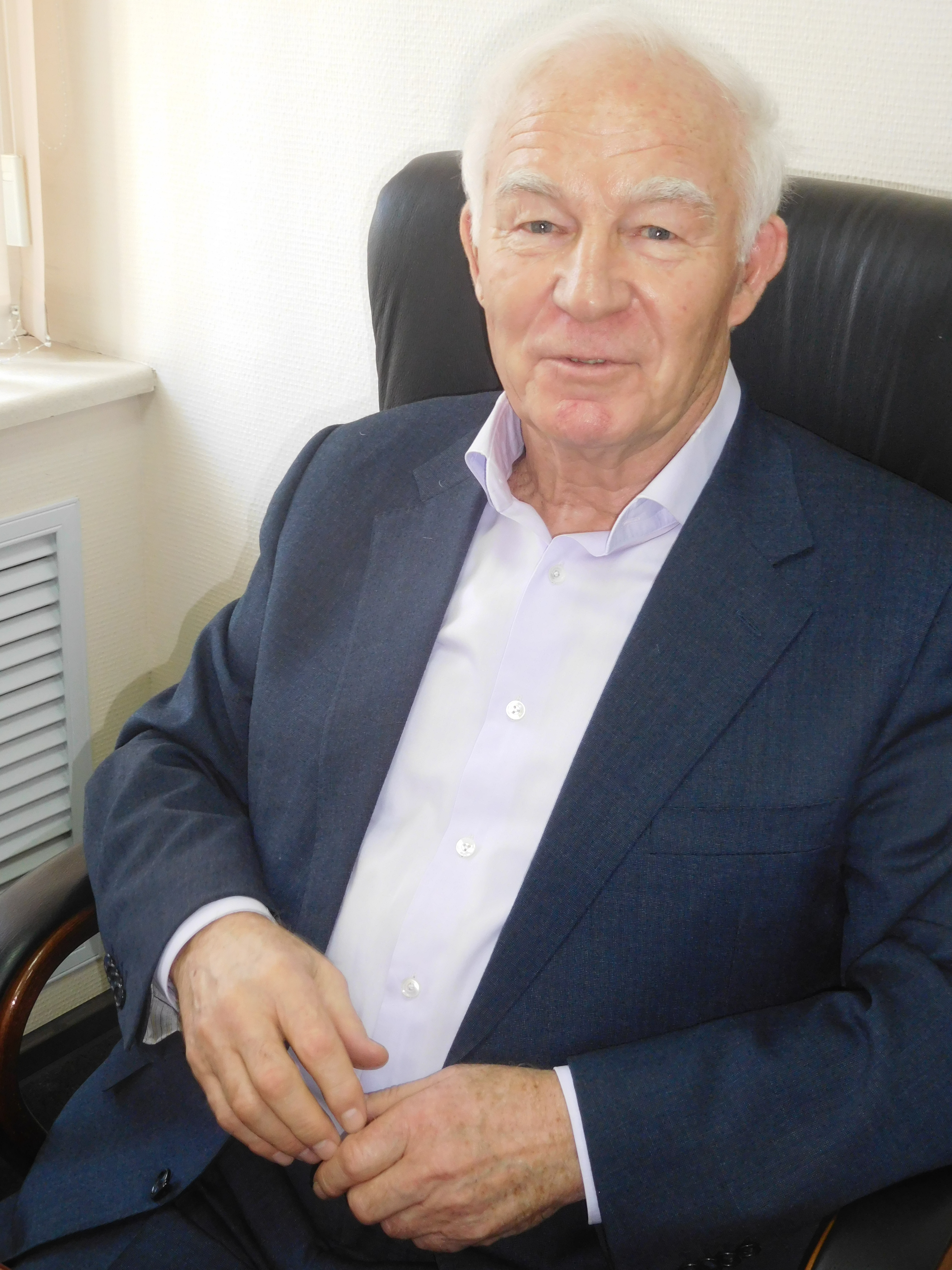
- Fadeyev in 2019

CEO of Russian Railways
- In office 22 September 2003 – 14 June 2005
- Succeeded by: Vladimir Yakunin

Minister of Railways
- In office 4 January 2002 – 22 September 2003
- Preceded by: Nikolai Aksyonenko
- Succeeded by: Vadim Morozov

Third head of Moscow Railway
- In office 3 March 1999 – 4 January 2002
- Preceded by: Ivan Paristy
- Succeeded by: Vladimir Starostenko

Minister of Railways
- In office 20 January 1992 – August 1996
- Succeeded by: Anatoly Zaytsev

Personal details
- Born: Gennady Matveyevich Fadeyev; 10 April 1937 (age 89) Shimanovsk, Russian SFSR, Soviet Union

Gennady Matveyevich Fadeyev (Russian: Генна́дий Матве́евич Фаде́ев; born 10 April 1937) is a Russian railway executive who has been advisor to the General Director of Russian Railways since 2015. Fadeyev was the first president of Russian Railways (from 2003 to 2005), and was Minister of Railways from 1992 to 1996 and from 2002 to 2003. He is a Full Cavalier of the Order "For Merit to the Fatherland" and an Honored Transport Worker of Russia.

Fadeyev helped preserve the Ministry of Railways during the early-1990s privatization of state property after the dissolution of the Soviet Union. He oversaw the opening of train traffic on the Baikal–Amur Mainline (BAM); electrification of the Trans-Siberian Railway and the main route to China, and construction of a second rail bridge across the Amur river near Khabarovsk and a rail bypass of Krasnoyarsk with a bridge across the Yenisey river. Fadeyev organized Russian production of its own electric trains at the Demikhov Machine-Building Plant; created a joint venture for the production of heavy track equipment with the Austrian company Plasser & Theurer; implemented smart-card technology throughout Russia; launched the first inter-regional express trains to Ryazan, Tula, Oryol, Yaroslavl and Vladimir and Russia's first Aeroexpress routes, to Moscow Domodedovo Airport from Moscow Paveletsky railway station and from Kievsky railway station to Vnukovo International Airport; restoration of the Yasnaya Polyana station, near the Leo Tolstoy Museum; the Ladozhsky railway station in Saint Petersburg, and the transition from narrow to broad gauge on Sakhalin. He is the last Russian railway executive with a rail background.

== Biography ==
Fadeyev, the youngest of seven children, was born on 10 April 1937 in Shimanovsk, Amur Oblast, to Matvey Yakovlevich and Yekaterina Ivanovna. Matvey worked at the Amur Railway's Shimanovskaya station in a locomotive depot, outfitting steam locomotives. Fadeyev finished 10 classes at the Ministry of Railways departmental school number 59. He spent time with older relatives on the railway, immersing himself in its environment and learning railway work. After receiving his certificate, however, Fadeyev went to Vladivostok to enter its Higher Naval School. When he saw the ocean for the first time, he realized that he was ill-suited for the sea and became a railway worker. On the entrance exams of the Institute of Railway Engineers in Khabarovsk, Fadeyev scored 24 out of a possible 25 points. He graduated with honours from the institute in 1961, and was sent to the East Siberian Railway.

=== Early career ===
As a student, Fadeyev was a duty officer at the Shimanovskaya station, a train dispatcher at the Skovorodino station, and worked at the Irkutsk-Sortirovochny station. After graduation, he worked at the Taishet junction as a dispatcher and senior assistant before becoming chief engineer from 1963 to 1965. Fadeyev then rose through the ranks of the Nizhneudinsk branch of the East Siberian Railway, overseeing construction of a new station in Nizhneudinsk. He was a member of the Nizhneudinsk City Council of Workers' Deputies from 1970 to 1975, and headed the railway's Taishet branch from 1974 to 1975. Fadeyev was head of the railway's Krasnoyarsk branch from 1975 to 1977, and was elected to the Krasnoyarsk Regional Council of Working People's Deputies. He was the East Siberian Railway's first deputy head from 1977 to 1979, and headed the Krasnoyarsk Railway from 1979 to 1984. Fadeyev headed the October Railway in Leningrad from March 1984 to August 1987, and was elected to Supreme Soviet of the RSFSR in February 1985. He was deputy minister, head of the Main Traffic Directorate, and a member of the Board of the Ministry of Railways of the Soviet Union from August 1987 to 1988.

In 1988, Fadeyev became First Deputy Minister of Railways. About 1,100,000 freight cars operated on Soviet railways that year, transporting 4,100,000,000 tons of cargo; this was over three times the 2018 freight volume. The railways were independent enterprises, rather than branches of the ministry.

=== Minister of Railways ===
On 20 January 1992, Fadeyev became Minister of Railways. Shortly after his appointment, an agreement was reached to retain the universal 1520 mm track gauge. The Council for Railway Transport of the Commonwealth and Baltic states was created to maintain railway unity throughout the former Soviet Union. An agreement allocating rolling freight stock among the CIS and Baltic countries, developed with Fadeyev's participation, was signed in Minsk on 22 January 1993. The Council for Railway Transport developed a unified tariff policy for interstate traffic. The Tariff Agreement for Railway Carriers of the CIS Countries was signed in February 1993, facilitating long-term contracts for international traffic.

At Fadeyev's initiative and with his participation, federal programs for technical re-equipment of rail transport were implemented. Production of electric trains at the Demikhov Machine-Building Plant has been hastened; Passenger diesel and electric locomotives have been developed and produced in Kolomna; passenger cars have been developed at the Tver Carriage Building Plant, and freight-car production by Uralvagonzavod has increased. In August 1996, after the re-election of Boris Yeltsin, Fadeyev resigned as minister and was elected Secretary General of the International Coordinating Council for Trans-Siberian Transportation.

In the late 1990s, rail profitability fell and the bureaucratization of the ministry under Nikolay Aksyonenko was criticized. The first reform, formulated by the ministry in 1998, under Aksyonenko, was criticized for creating a joint-stock company under the ministry instead of denationalizing the industry. A program for reforming the Russian rail industry was developed under Fadeyev's leadership with the involvement of private consultants. The Accounts Chamber and the Prosecutor General's Office carried out large-scale inspections which revealed serious violations, resulting in a criminal case against Aksyonenko.

On 4 January 2002, Fadeyev was re-appointed Minister of Railways. The Russian rail industry was in a management crisis, with large federal and regional debts; over 300 criminal cases were initiated. Fadeyev learned that under Aksyonenko, large private mining companies were secretly using government funds to build railway approaches to promising coal and iron-ore deposits.

In 2002, Russian railways had a significant amount of freight construction in progress. Wages of railway workers were lower than those of other industries, causing an exodus of qualified engineering personnel. The first cost-effective, deficit-free financial plan, which included state support for unprofitable passenger traffic, was formulated under Fadeyev in 2003. Preparations were made to separate state regulation from economic activity, leading to the creation of state-owned Russian Railways (headed by Fadeyev) at the end of 2003. Fadeyev predicted a strategic need for the Northern Latitudinal Railway and a third main route along the length of the Trans-Siberian Railway, and construction began 15 years later.

=== Head of Moscow Railway ===
Fadeyev was appointed head of Moscow Railway, part of the Ministry of Railways, on 3 March 1999. Under his leadership, Sputnik luxury service and express service with conductors to Tula, Oryol, Ryazan, Yaroslavl, Vladimir and other regional centers began. Fadeyev opposed Moscow Mayor Yury Luzhkov's 2001 plan for diesel passenger service around the city as unfeasible, and reconstruction and electrification for high-speed Lastochka service began in 2011.

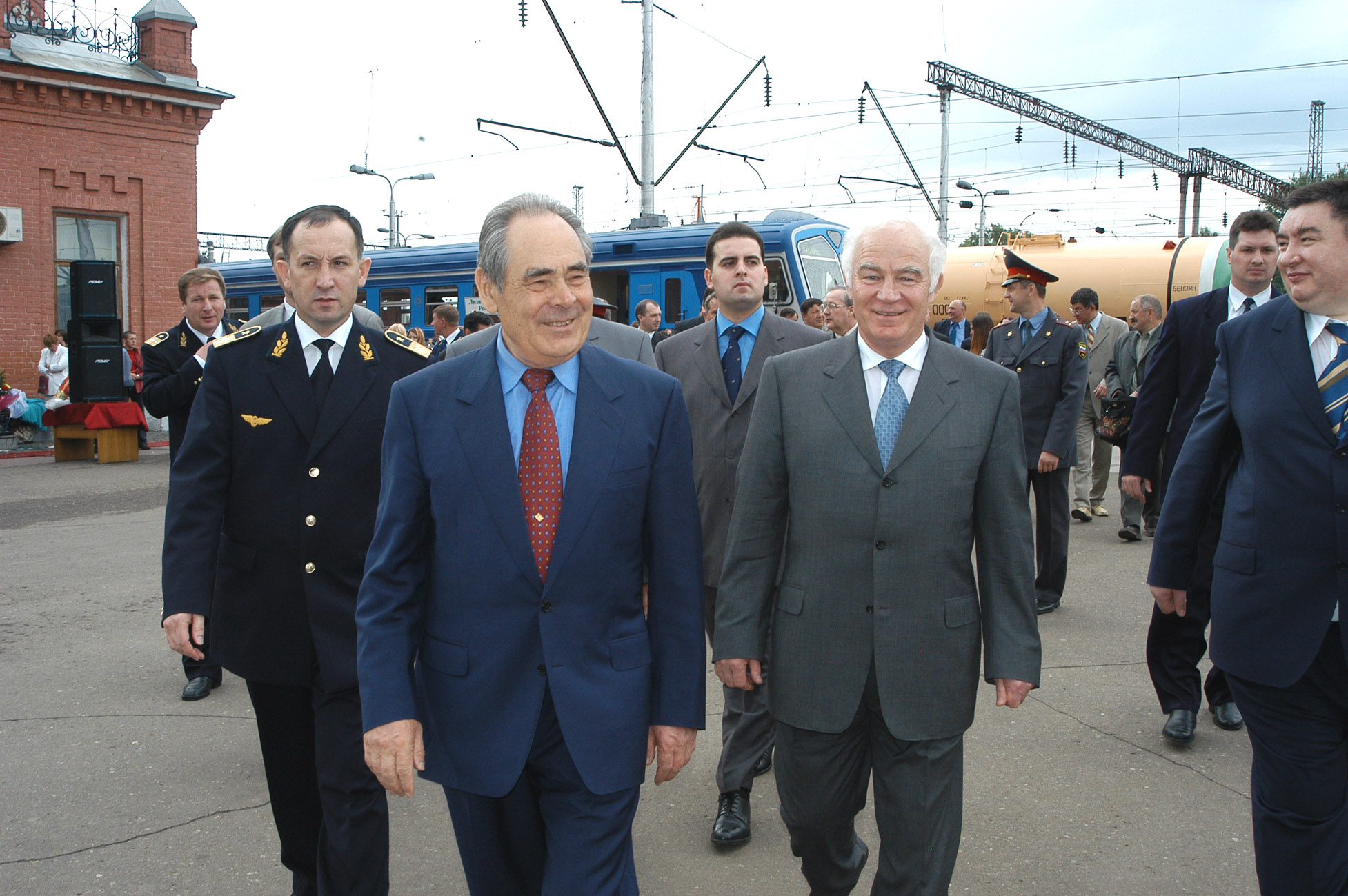
With Mintimer Shaimiev, 25 June 2003

In August 2002, Russia's first Aeroexpress service began from Moscow Paveletsky railway station to Moscow Domodedovo Airport. After a steep price increase by Riga Carriage Works, production of Russian electric trains began at the Demikhov Machine-Building Plant and Fadeyev instituted economic reforms.

=== President of Russian Railways ===
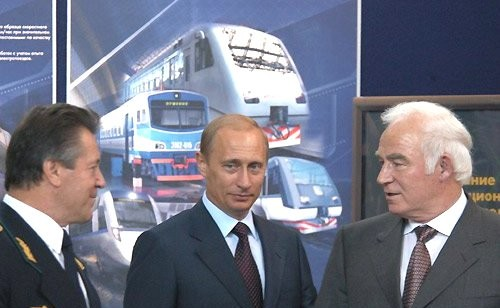
Opening of Ladozhky Rail Terminal, 15 June 2003

On 22 September 2003, Fadeyev became the first president of Russian Railways. Under his tenure, the BAM's Severomuysky Tunnel was completed; the Sakhalin conversion from narrow to broad gauge began; strategic lines, including the Trans-Siberian Railway and the route to China, were electrified. In Saint Petersburg, the Ladozhsky railway station opened.

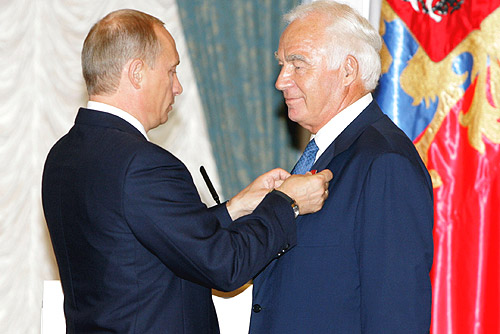
Presentation of the Order "For Merit to the Fatherland", 4th class, 25 July 2005

On 11 April 2005 in Hanover, Fadeyev and Siemens CEO Hans Schabert signed a €1.5 billion agreement for the purchase of three Siemens Velaro trains and the joint development and production in Russia of 52 electric trains with a maximum speed of 300 km/h. It was assumed that the trains would be produced in Russia as a joint venture with the Sinara Group. After the June 2005 appointment of Vladimir Yakunin as president of Russian Railways, the project was changed by the Russian Railways board of directors. By 2006, eight Siemens Velaro trains had been purchased in Germany. The contract had decreased to €750 million (including €300 million for trains and €300 million for maintenance for 30 years), and train production in Russia was no longer planned. Fadeyev considered the change in the agreement disadvantageous, and he was replaced as president of Russian Railways on 14 June 2005. From June 2005 to 2007, he was an assistant to Prime Minister Mikhail Fradkov and a member of the board of directors of Russian Railways. After the 2007 resignation of the Mikhail Fradkov government, Fadeyev was removed from the Russian Railways board.

=== Later activities ===
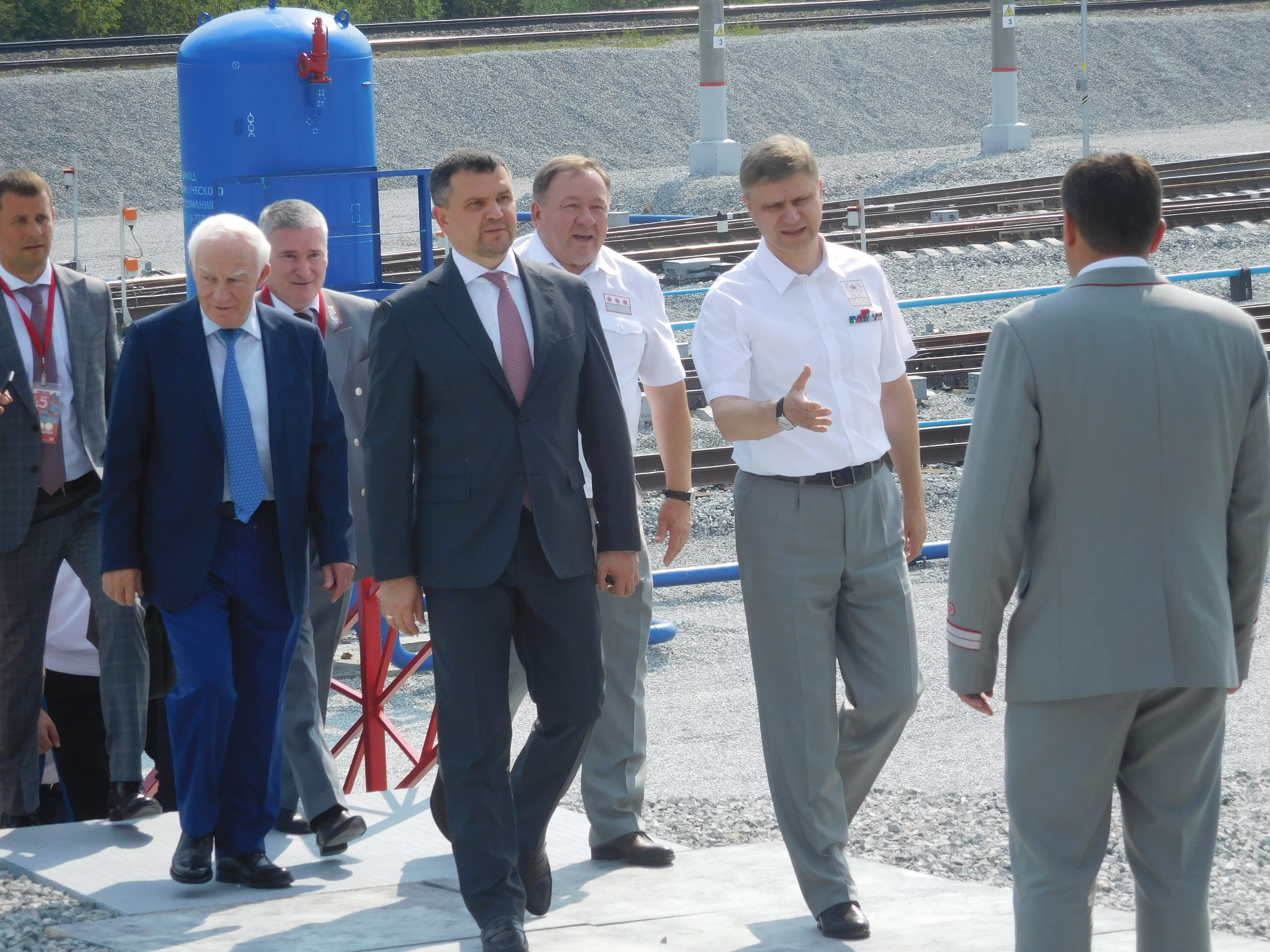
Fadeyev, Maksim Akimov and Oleg Belozyorov opened a new marshalling yard at the BAM's Tynda station on 7 July 2019.

Fadeyev's 2007 memoir, My Destiny is the Railway, describes his many years in the industry. Since 16 September 2015, he has been a voluntary adviser to Russian Railways president Oleg Belozyorov.

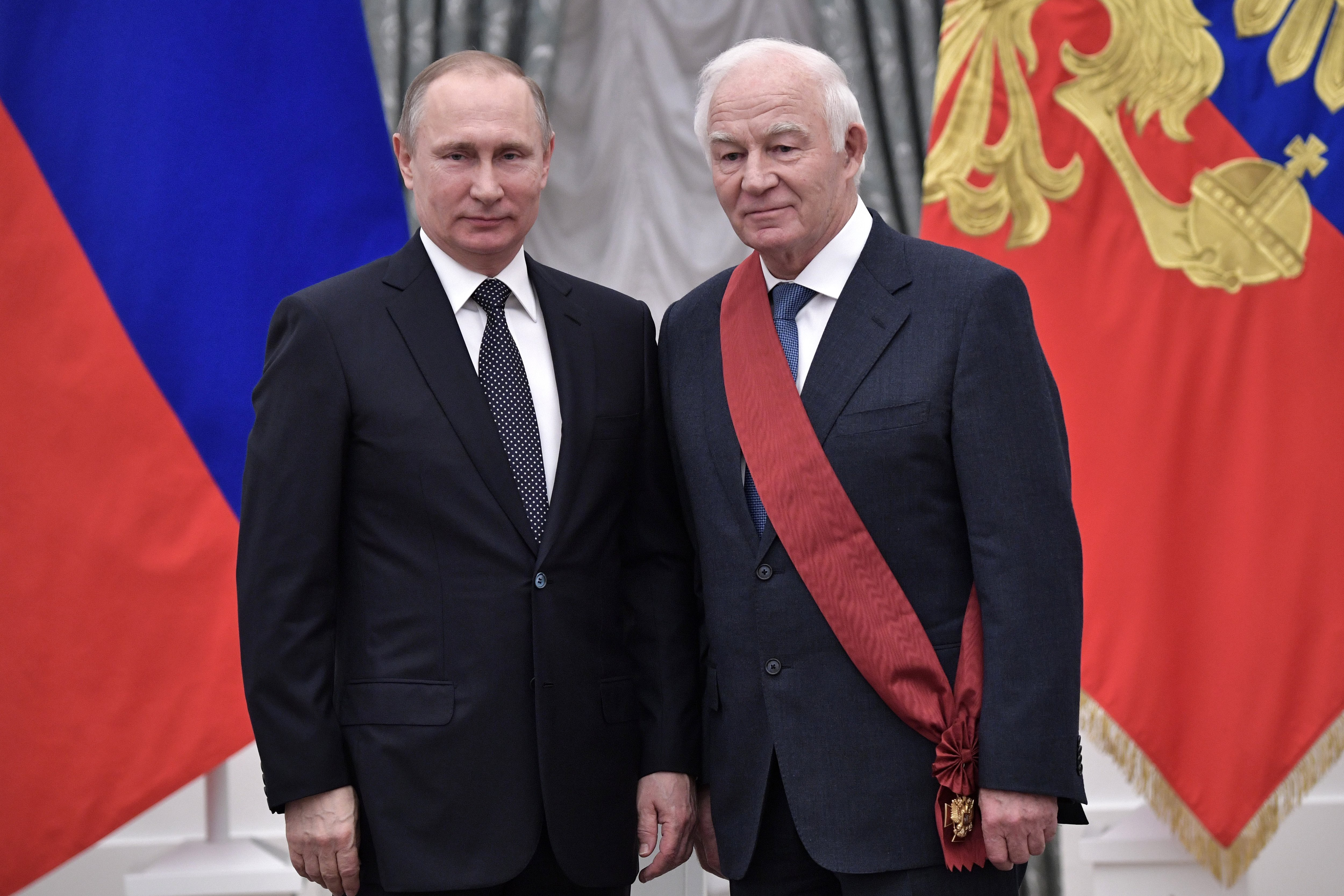
Presentation of the Order "For Merit to the Fatherland", 1st class, 26 January 2017

Fadeyev repeatedly advised President Vladimir Putin that the state should retain control of the railway industry and considered it as one of the three pillars of Russian statehood, with energy and a strong army. He interpreted increased 2016 discussions about the possible partial privatization of Russian Railways as a sign of impending disaster. In September of that year, Fadeyev criticized the system which emerged from the railway reform in which regional management was weak and railway leadership lost its power. "The directorates of the central level of Russian Railways are not capable of making prompt decisions in connection with the real situation in a particular region. Moscow cannot see everything that happens thousands of kilometers away and take into account the specifics of each road. A situation has arisen where the 'tops' do not see all the real problems, and the 'bottoms' cannot solve them due to the lack of the necessary resources", he said in an April 2016 article in the main Russian Railways newspaper.

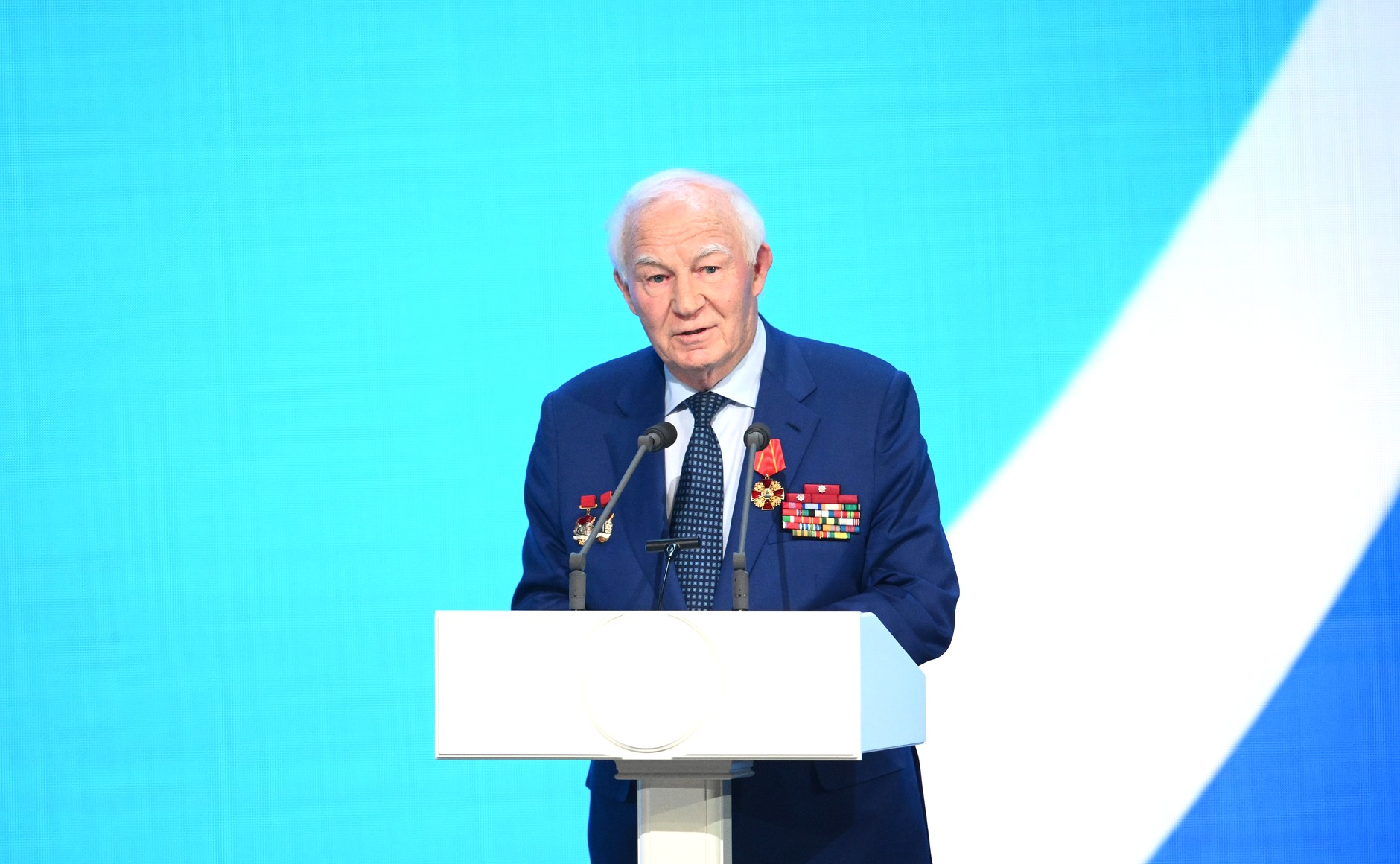
Presentation of the Order of Alexander Nevsky, 23 April 2024

In December 2016, Fadeyev became the first transport worker and the 34th in Russian history to receive the Order "For Merit to the Fatherland". When he received the award the following month at the Kremlin, he again asked Putin not to privatize Russian railways. In 2019 and 2020, Fadeyev and research institutes were working to increase eastward coal-shipping from Kuzbass. He is a consultant with federal authorities, railway holding and cargo owners, and an author of analytical materials and proposed solutions.

== Personal life ==
Fadeyev has been married to Lyubov Yevgenyevna Fadeyeva since 1960, when they were engaged in the village of Kukhterin Lug, Amur Oblast. Friends since childhood, Lyubov was a year ahead of Gennady at the Ministry of Railways No. 59 departmental school and graduated from Blagoveshchensk State Pedagogical University with a degree in English and German education. They have two daughters, three granddaughters, two grandsons and one great-grandson.

Fadeyev has enjoyed sports since childhood. He became interested in alpine skiing, and regularly visits ski resorts in the Swiss and Italian Alps; he was in Zermatt in February 2020 at age 82. Fadeyev also enjoys tennis, cycles in Meshchyorsky National Park, and rides 15–25 km daily on an exercise bike. As a youth, he played on railway football and volleyball teams. He is a theatergoer.
