= Nikolay Aksyonenko =

Russian politician

- Николай Аксёненко
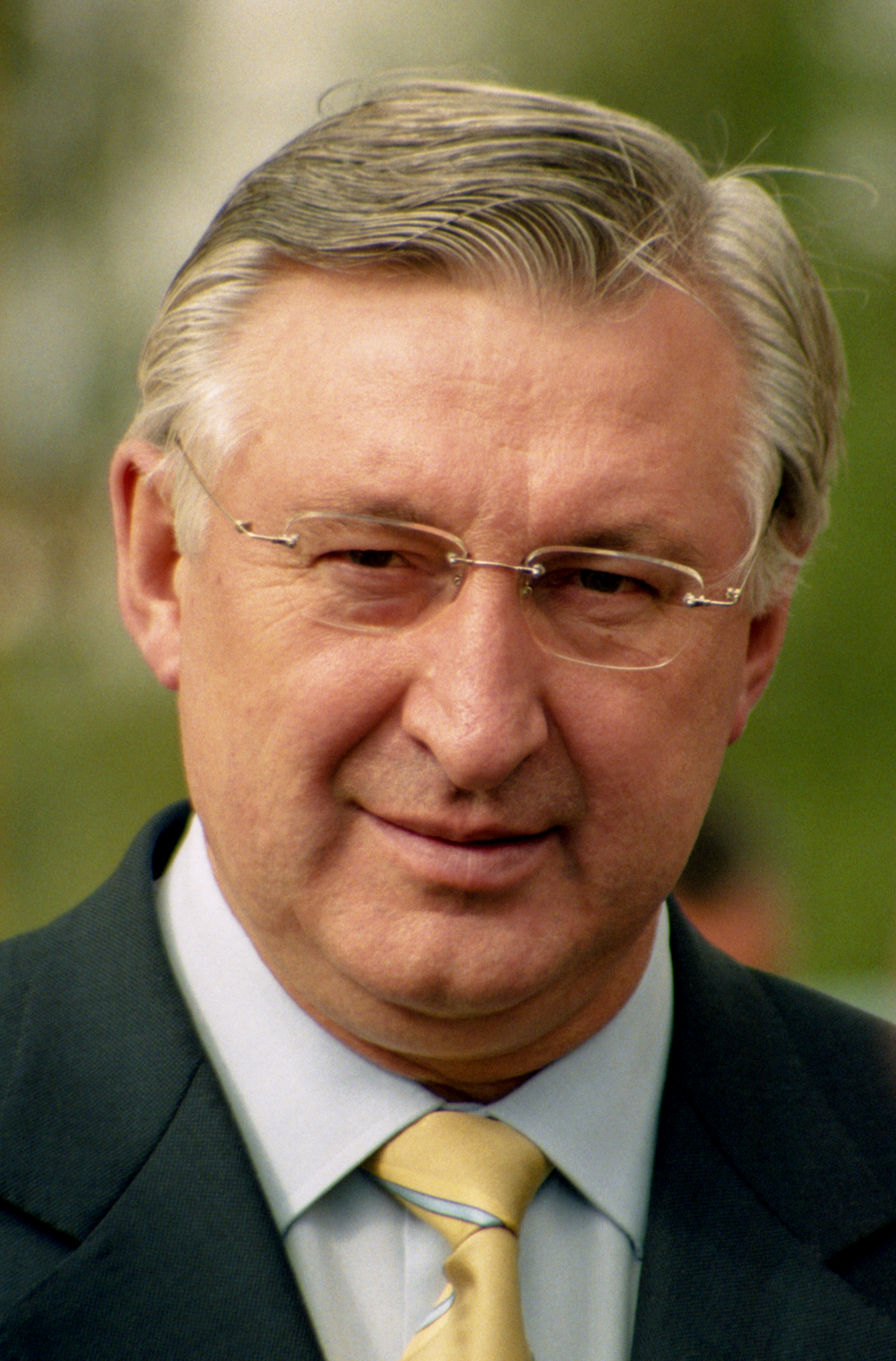
- Aksyonenko in 2001

First Deputy Prime Minister of Russia
- In office 21 May 1999 – 10 January 2000
- Premier: Sergey Stepashin; Vladimir Putin

Minister of Railways
- In office 16 September 1999 – 3 January 2002
- Preceded by: Vladimir Starostenko
- Succeeded by: Gennady Fadeyev
- In office 15 April 1997 – 21 May 1999
- Preceded by: Anatoly Zaytsev
- Succeeded by: Vladimir Starostenko

Personal details
- Born: 15 March 1949 Novoaleksandrovka, Bolotninsky District, Novosibirsk Oblast, RSFSR, Soviet Union
- Died: 20 July 2005 (aged 56) Munich, Germany
- Resting place: Nikolskoe Cemetery
- Education: Siberian State Transport University
- Awards

Nikolay Yemelyanovich Aksyonenko (Russian: Никола́й Емелья́нович Аксёненко; 15 March 1949 – 20 July 2005) was a Russian railway manager and politician.

== Biography ==
=== Early life ===
Nikolay Aksyonenko was born on 15 March 1949 in the village of Novoaleksandrovka, Bolotninsky District, Novosibirsk Oblast. He was the youngest, 13th child in a large family of an assistant driver. In his youth, he was engaged in heavyweight boxing and football. After leaving school in 1966, he tried to enter the Novosibirsk Electrotechnical Institute, but he failed to pass the tests. In 1967 he entered the Novosibirsk Institute of Railway Engineers.

=== Railway worker ===
In 1972 he was appointed a duty officer at the Vikhorevka and Nizhneudinsk stations. In 1974 he was appointed head of the Azey station of the East Siberian Railway. From 1978 to 1979 — deputy head of the Otrozhka station of the South Eastern railway. Since 1979 he worked as deputy chief, then head of the traffic department of the Voronezh branch of the South Eastern railway. In 1984 he was transferred to the October Railway, where he held the positions of deputy head of the Murmansk branch (until 1985), Head of the Leningrad-Finland branch (until 1986), chief economist, first deputy head of the October Railway.

=== Federal government ===
In 1994-1996, he held the post of deputy minister, since 1996 — first deputy minister, since 15 April 1997 — Minister of Railways of Russia. During his work, the Kizlyar—Kizilyurt railway was completed, telecommunication company TransTelekom was founded, a transit connection was established through the territory of Russia. At the same time, several dead-end railway branches were disbanded in Moscow Oblast.

==== Rumored successor of Yeltsin ====
On 19 May 1999 Aksyonenko was appointed First Deputy Chairman of the Government within the Sergei Stepashin's Cabinet. Previously he was considered by Boris Yeltsin as a candidate for prime minister.

Aksyonenko was actively lobbied by Tatyana Dyachenko, Roman Abramovich and Alexander Mamut. There was a moment when Yeltsin called Gennady Seleznyov (17 May 1999) and said that Aksyonenko's candidacy was being proposed to the Duma, and the speaker announced it at a plenary session. Everyone then made a noise, because Stepashin had already been nominated for the prime minister.
Circumstances did not allow Aksyonenko to become president: the Chubais group seriously opposed him. Yeltsin could not allow a split in the government, and therefore found a compromise figure in the person of Putin.

On 16 September 1999, Aksyonenko was re-appointed Minister of Railways in the Vladimir Putin's First Cabinet, retaining the post of First Deputy Prime Minister. He chaired the Government during Putin's trip to New Zealand. On 10 January 2000, Aksyonenko left the post of deputy premier, remaining minister of railways.

=== Last years ===
In October 2001, Aksyonenko was summoned to the Prosecutor General's Office, where he was charged with abuse of office and misuse of profits. According to the auditors, the Railway Ministry top officials diverted money from the investment program in order to buy private apartments. On October 31, representatives of the Prosecutor General's Office reported that the federal budget lost more than 11 billion rubles as a result of Aksyonenko's actions.

On 3 January 2002, prime minister Mikhail Kasyanov proposed president Putin to dismiss Aksyonenko. On the same day, the president signed a corresponding decree, and Aksyonenko, in turn, submitted a letter of resignation. In October 2003, he left Russia for treatment in one of the foreign clinics (Aksyonenko suffered from leukemia).

Nikolai Aksyonenko died on 20 July 2005 at the Klinikum Großhadern, Munich. He was buried at Nikolskoe Cemetery of the Alexander Nevsky Lavra, Saint Petersburg.

== Honours ==
- Aksyonenko Square in Moshkovo, Novosibirsk Oblast
- Nikolay Aksyonenko, car-passenger ferry of the Kerch Strait ferry line
