= Krasnoyarsk-North railway station =

Railway station in Russia

Krasnoyarsk–North Красноярск–Северный

General information
- Location: Russia
- Coordinates: 56°04′23″N 92°55′59″E
- Operator: Krasnoyarsk Railway
- Line: Bugachi-Zykov branch line (Trans-Siberian Railway)
- Platforms: 1 side platform (straight)

Other information
- Station code: 890108 (Express-3 code:2038099)
Location

Krasnoyarsk–North railway station (Russian: Красноярск–Северный, Красноярск–Сев.) is a railway station on the Bugachi-Zykov branch line of Trans-Siberian Railway in Krasnoyarsk, Russia. It is located 12.9 kilometres (8.0 mi) from Bugachi, 19.8 kilometres (12.3 mi) from Krasnoyarsk Railway station, and 4,103.1 kilometres (2,549.5 mi) from Moscow. Local trains run between Krasnoyarsk-North and Krasnoyarsk through Bugachi weekday mornings and evenings (Monday to Friday), and some of them run through Krasnoyarsk. It takes about 37 minutes between Krasnoyarsk-North and Krasnoyarsk.
