= Bolotny =

Bolotny (Russian: Болотный; masculine), Bolotnaya (Болотная; feminine), or Bolotnoye (Болотное; neuter) is the name of several inhabited localities in Russia.

Urban localities

- Bolotnoye, a town in Bolotninsky District of Novosibirsk Oblast

Rural localities

- Bolotnaya, Mari El Republic, a village in Emekovsky Rural Okrug of Volzhsky District of the Mari El Republic
- Bolotnaya, Novgorod Oblast, a village in Syrkovskoye Settlement of Novgorodsky District of Novgorod Oblast

Landmarks

- Bolotnaya Square, a square in Moscow
