= Nikolai Kozlenya =

Russian criminal and serial killer

- Born: Nikolai Nikolaevich Kozlenya; 25 October 1971 (age 54); Bolotnoye, Novosibirsk Oblast, RSFSR
- Conviction: Murder
- Penalty: Life imprisonment

Details
- Victims: 7
- Span of crimes: 1998–2001
- Country: Russia
- States: Tomsk, Novosibirsk
- Date apprehended: 21 March 2001

Nikolai Nikolaevich Kozlenya (Russian: Никола́й Никола́евич Козле́ня; born 25 October 1971) is a Russian criminal and serial killer, who in the period between 1998 and 2001 committed 7 murders and several other attempted murders against drivers, with the aim of seizing their vehicles.

== Biography ==
Nikolai Kozlenya was born in 1971 in the town of Bolotnoye into a family of railroad workers. Shortly after his birth, his family moved to the city of Tayga, Kemerovo Oblast. He graduated from the local school and entered the railway college, where he was a well-performing student and headman of his study group. After graduation, Kozlenya went to serve in the army, where he was subjected to bullying by his drunken seniors. According to the investigator who examined the case later on, it was these factors which caused a change in Kozlenya's psyche. While in the army, he tried to slice open his vein in a suicide attempt, though survived. After this, Kozlenya was commissioned.

After returning home, Kozlenya worked for several years as a platelayer, where he was regarded as a good worker. After that, he entered the Siberian State Transport University, from which, after studying there for some time, he eventually left. He then tried to start his own business but quickly went bankrupt.

An investigator into the case later told:

... The purpose of enrichment for him was the idea of fixing, which he throughout his life tried to realize. He had a blue dream - a yacht, a white cowboy ...

== Murders ==
The first attempted murder Kozlenya made was in November 1998 in Tomsk when he, having walked in a restaurant, found out that he did not have enough money to pay the bill. Leaving his jacket as a pledge, he left the restaurant and stopped a private driver. Having successfully stopped him, Kozlenya pulled out a knife and tried to kill the driver, wounding him in the neck. The man actively resisted and managed to survive, and the criminal escaped, leaving the knife and never taking his jacket from the restaurant. His identity was fairly quickly established and put on the federal wanted list.

Having decided to engage in criminal industry, Kozlenya returned to Novosibirsk and bought a sawed-off shotgun from Tula. After that, he rented a garage (later he changed garages several times) and started committing crimes.

All crimes committed by Kozlenya were done in the same way: he would hide the sawn-off shotgun in a sports bag and then stop drivers without bargaining, agreeing to the offered prices, and then sit in the back of the seat. Kozlenya then called the address, not far from the rented garage. Having reached the place, Kozlenya would shoot the driver in the head, then put his corpse in the right passenger seat.

The following six murders Kozlenya committed with the help of his underage partner, Bobovich, who distracted the drivers while the killer took out his weapon. Kozlenya threatened her, forcing her to flirt with buyers of spare parts, so that they were more compliant.

The car from the first murder Kozlenya disposed of in a random yard, then disassembled it for parts and sold them afterwards. The next three murders he committed using one car, which he eventually took away from his garage and burned. One of these murders was committed precisely in order to take possession of the car, and then burn it.

== Arrest, trial and sentence ==
In early 2001, Kozlenya decided to flee from Novosibirsk, but was soon detained in Chelyabinsk. Bobovich was also detained, but the court subsequently acquitted her. Kozlenya confessed to the 7 murders, but during the investigation, he pretended to be insane several times and also tried to convince the authorities he was innocent. In December 2002, the court sentenced Nikolai Kozlenya to life imprisonment in a special regime colony. He is still serving his sentence to this day.

== See also ==
- List of Russian serial killers
