= Yenisey railway station =

Railway station in Russia

Yenisey Енисей
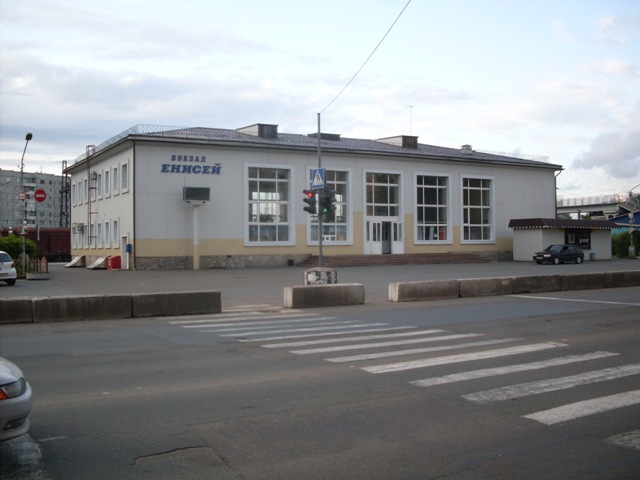
- Yenisey railway station

General information
- Coordinates: 55°58′47″N 92°50′32″E
- Operated by: Krasnoyarsk Railway
- Line: Trans-Siberian Railway
- Distance: 4103 km from Moscow
- Platforms: 2 Islands, 1 side (straight)

Other information
- Station code: 89140 (ECP code:891401, Express-3 code:2038002)

History
- Opened: 1899
Location

Yenisey railway station (Russian: Енисей) is a station on the Krasnoyarsk Railway. It is located on the Trans-Siberian Railway, 4,103 kilometres (2,549 mi) east of Moscow and 5 kilometres (3.1 mi) east of the Krasnoyarsk Railway station.

== Description ==
The station has three platforms. An island platform, situated between the main tracks (tracks 7 and 8), is used for eastbound electric multiple unit commuter trains traveling from Krasnoyarsk, as well as local passenger trains, and occasionally trains bound for Divnogorsk. The other two platforms – an island platform located between tracks 1 and 2 and the first side platform (near track 1) – usually accommodate only commuter trains bound for Divnogorsk. A pedestrian bridge crosses the station tracks. The station building is located on the south side of the tracks. All commuter trains, including the high-speed Krasnoyarsk-Ilansky and Krasnoyarsk-Reshoty trains, stop at the station. Long-distance trains do not stop at the station, except for the Krasnoyarsk-Karabula and Krasnoyarsk-Abakan trains.

The western end of the station has an additional yard, used primarily for storing freight cars.
