= Vladimir Starostenko =

Russian politician (1948–2017)

- Владимир Старостенко

Head of the Moscow Railway
- In office February 2002 – 10 November 2009
- Preceded by: Gennady Fadeyev
- Succeeded by: Vladimir Moldaver

Minister of Railways
- In office 29 May 1999 – 16 September 1999
- Preceded by: Nikolai Aksyonenko
- Succeeded by: Nikolai Aksyonenko

Personal details
- Born: Vladimir Ivanovich Starstenko; 2 September 1948 Tatarsk, Russian SFSR, Soviet Union
- Died: 31 October 2017 (aged 69) Moscow, Russia
- Spouse: Galina Ivanovna Starostenko

Vladimir Ivanovich Starstenko (Russian: Влади́мир Ива́нович Старосте́нко; 2 September 1948 – 31 October 2017) was a Russian politician, statesman, economist, railway operator, and engineer who had served as the Head of the Moscow Railway from 2002 to 2009. He was also the Head of the West Siberian Railways from 1997 to 1999, and again from 1999 to 2002.

Starastenko also served as the Minister of Railways in 1999.

Starting his career as an on-duty station post of electrical centralization, Starostenko successively went through all the steps of the career ladder, was the head of three major railways, and at the top of his career was the post of head of the Ministry of Railways of Russia.

From 2009 to 2014, he was a member of the board of Russian Railways, and was an adviser to the president of the company, Vladimir Yakunin.

As of January 2014, upon his retirement, he worked on the railway for 47 years.

He died in Moscow on 31 October 2017.

== Biography ==
Vladimir Starastenko was born on 2 September 1948 in the city of Tatarsk, in Novosibirsk Oblast.

Between 1966 and 1996, he worked on the West Siberian Railway.

In 1968, he graduated from the Tomsk Railway Transport College.

He was on duty at the Tatarskaya station park, chief of staff of the Civil Defense. In 1970, he was the deputy head of the Tatarskaya station.

In 1975, he graduated from the Novosibirsk Institute of Railway Engineers.

From 1975 to 1976, he worked as an auditor of the traffic department of the Omsk branch of the West Siberian Railway.

He had gained valuable experience by getting acquainted with the work of the largest sorting yards of the Western Siberian Railway - Inskaya and Altaiskaya.

In 1977, at the age of 28, Starostenko took his first managerial position, as the chief engineer of the Vhodnaya marshalling yard near Omsk. Soon he became the head of the station Karbyshevo-1 from 1980 to 1983. From 1983 to 1990, he was the head of the cargo traffic department and the first deputy head of the Omsk branch of the Western Siberian Railway. From 1990 to 1996, he worked as head of the Novosibirsk branch of the Western Siberian Railway, and as the deputy head of the road for traffic safety.

From 1996 to 1997, Starostenko served as head of the Kemerovo branch of the West Siberian Railway, and from 1997 to 1999, he became the head of the West Siberian Railway. Together with Minister Nikolai Aksyonenko, he took part in resolving the crisis with the miners who blocked the Trans-Siberian Railway. They developed a new technology for loading and exporting coal from Kuzbass. For the first time, he introduced a regional automated dispatching control center for transportation. Starostenko made a significant contribution to the modernization of the West Siberian Railway and prepared its merger with the Kemerovo Railway. He organized specialized enterprises for the repair of track equipment in Siberia and Moscow.

On 29 May 1999, Starostenko was appointed Minister of Railways. On 16 September, due to upheavals in the Government of Russia, he was dismissed and reappointed as head of the West Siberian Railway. Under Starostenko, the first suburban passenger companies in Russia appeared on the ZSZhD on shares with local authorities.

In February 2002, Starastenko became the head of the Moscow Railway. Starostenko developed suburban high-speed traffic on Moscow road, putting into circulation new passenger trains, which are in high demand among passengers. In 2002, with the launch of the Aeroexpress train at Domodedovo, an intermodal service was organized for the first time on the Russian Railways network, then the Aeroexpress trains were launched to three airports.

In 2003, Starostenko established the tradition of conferring honorary titles "Enterprise of Efficient Technologies and Aesthetics". Under his leadership, work was carried out to restore the historical appearance of the station complexes and several stations, the Kaluga railway technical school was repaired.

From 2003 to 2014, Starostenko was a member of the board of Russian Railways, and this was the only case when the head of one of the railways, while in office, was also a member of the company's board.

In 2004, the first regional express train Moscow-Mytishchi was launched. A fundamental modernization of the infrastructure and 10 large marshaling yards has begun, and several innovative and investment projects have been implemented. Under Starostenko's leadership, the Unified Dispatch Control Center was opened at the Moscow Railways, the length of the “shoulders” was increased - the sections for the circulation of locomotives and locomotive crews. In 2008, at his suggestion, the General Scheme for the Development of the Moscow Railway Hub was adopted, which also provided for the construction of the Moscow Central Ring.

To improve the efficiency of the largest freight station on the Moscow Railway, Bekasovo-Sortirovochnoye, at Starostenko's initiative, the parks were reconstructed with the lengthening of the railway tracks to 100 conditional cars, and the hump complexes were automated. A similar reconstruction was also carried out at the Orekhovo-Zuevo station. In the future, at these stations, the dissolution of freight trains was arranged in an automated mode, without the participation of an operator, with a guarantee of the necessary braking modes.

In October 2008, Starostenko reorganized the Moscow Railwayman newspaper, for the first time abandoning the departmental principle in the selection of leadership personnel and inviting political scientist and international journalist Vladimir Shelkov to the post of editor-in-chief.

On 10 November 2009, Starostenko was dismissed as the head of the Moscow Railway.

Starostenko's important innovations at the Moscow Railways include the development of the title “Honorary Veteran of the Moscow Railway”, the transfer of the Unecha sanatorium in the Bryansk region specifically for rest and restoration of the health of non-working veterans of the Moscow Railway, the establishment of funding for the veteran organization of the Moscow Railway for 500 thousand rubles a month ( 6 million rubles per year) and 50 thousand rubles monthly for the Council of Veterans of the Moscow Railways. Later, since 2015, Starostenko's initiative was transformed into a donation agreement, according to which the Moscow Railway Department annually allocated 8.25 million rubles for the needs of the veteran organization of the road (based on 55 thousand veterans of the Moscow Railway, 150 rubles each).

Throughout his career, Starostenko was distinguished by an expressive, tough, wayward character, and a penchant for harsh strong-willed decisions. According to Viktor Roshchevkin, the deputy chairman of the Council of Veterans of the Moscow Railway, during the spring and autumn rounds of railway enterprises, Starostenko could impromptu, in a fit of anger, fire several railway managers at once in the divisions. In total, in such a simplified manner, according to Roshchevkin's calculations, about 700 middle managers were fired from the Moscow Railways over the 7 years of Starostenko's activity, many of whom were never able to continue working on the railway. Starostenko's successor as head of the Moscow Railways, Vladimir Moldaver, speaking at a scientific and practical conference in 2018, described Starostenko's line as "a combination of a strict enterprise management system and the widespread use of advanced operational work technologies.".

Our railway business is very cumbersome but extremely primitive.

— Starostenko gives a succinct definition of the industry to which he dedicated his entire life:

After his resignation in 2009 from the post of head of Moscow Railways, Starostenko retained the portfolio of a member of the company's board and was appointed adviser to the president of Russian Railways, Vladimir Yakunin. In this position, he advocated partial decentralization of management, the transfer of several powers to road chiefs, the creation of information and control computer systems, and the transition to "unmanned" technologies that exclude the influence of the human factor.

Starostenko worked on the railway for 47 years.

He penned the "Gallery of Glory" at the Department of Moscow Railways, where portraits of railway workers of the Moscow Mainline are presented - from machinists to bosses. He wanted his colleagues to say after his death: “I worked with Starostenko!”.

He retired in January 2014. Sending his adviser to a well-deserved rest Yakunin presented Starostenko with the second badge "Honorary Railway Worker".

Starostenko had published works on the operation of railways, on the topic of managing the transportation process.

Vladimir Ivanovich Starostenko died suddenly on 31 October 2017 at the age of 69 in Moscow from sudden cardiac arrest in his sleep. He was buried on 2 November at the Troekurovsky cemetery.

== Memorials ==
On 1 October 2018, a scientific and practical conference dedicated to Starostenko was held in the building of the Moscow Railway Administration, and a memorial plaque in his honor was opened in the "Gallery of Glory".

== Family ==
His widow, Galina Ivanovna Starostenko has a son.
