= Belozyorov =

Belozyorov, Belozyerov, or Belozerov (Russian: Белозёров) and Belozyorova, Belozyerova, or Belozerova (Russian: Белозёрова) are masculine and feminine forms of a common Russian surname.

Notable people with the surname include:

- Aleksandr Belozyorov (footballer) (born 1981), Russian football player
- Oleg Belozyorov (born 1969), Russian politician and manager
