= Vadim Morozov =

Russian politician (1954–2021)

- Вадим Морозов
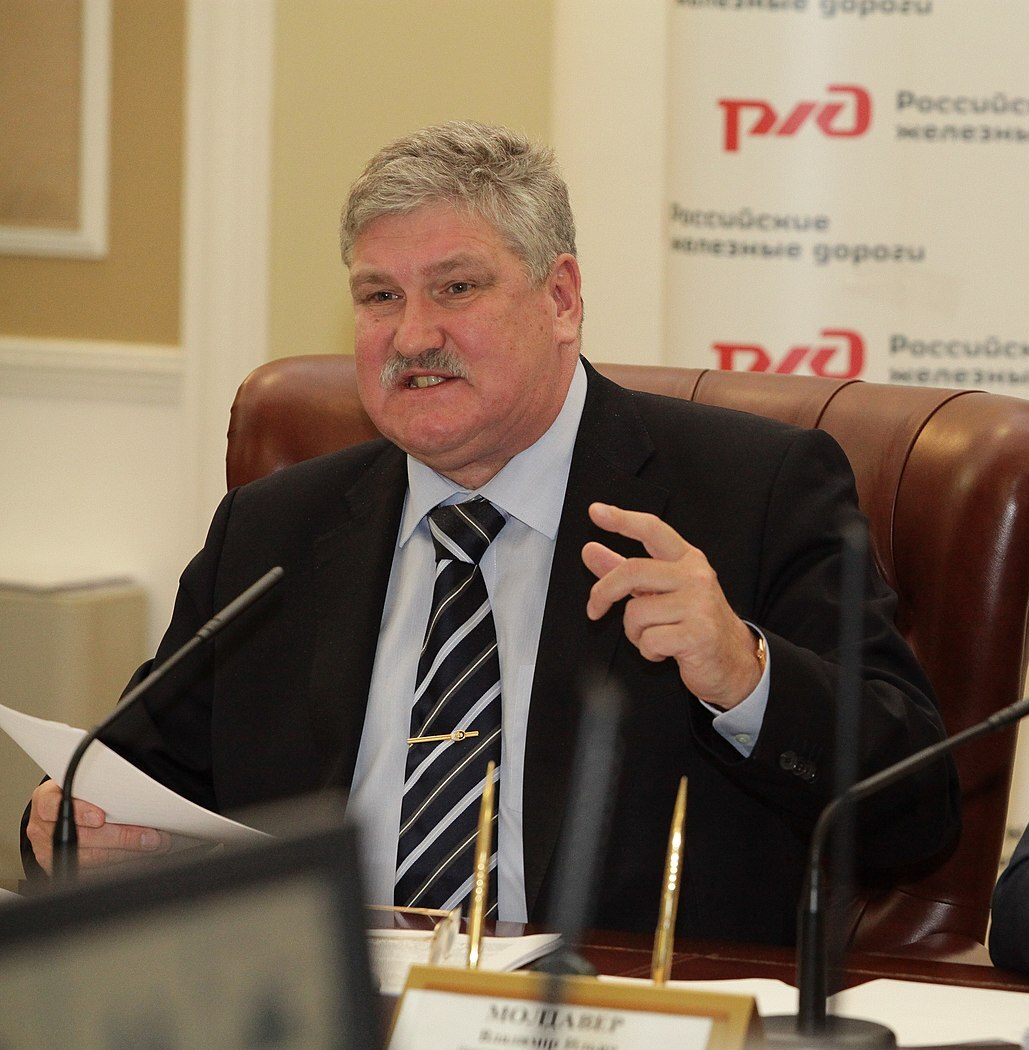
- Morozov in 2013

Minister of Railways
- In office 7 October 2003 – 9 March 2004
- President: Vladimir Putin
- Preceded by: Gennady Fadeyev
- Succeeded by: Post abolished

Personal details
- Born: Vadim Nikolayevich Morozov; 24 June 1954 Volkhov, Russian SFSR, Soviet Union
- Died: 7 November 2021 (aged 67) Moscow, Russia

Vadim Nikolayevich Morozov (Russian: Вадим Николаевич Морозов; 24 June 1954 – 7 November 2021) was a Russian politician, magazine writer, and businessman.

He was a senior advisor to the President of JSC "Russian Railways", a member of the board of the company. In specialty, Morozov was a railway engineer. He was formerly the first vice-president of Russian Railways from 2005 to 2015, who was responsible for the operational management of the company.

He was the last railways minister before the position was abolished in 2004.

== Career ==
Morozov began his career in 1971, as a mechanic locomotive depot Volkhovstroy 1 October Railway. He graduated from the Leningrad Institute of Railway Engineers in 1977. After graduation, he continued to work on the road, where he rose from there. From 1977 to 1997, he worked at the Oktyabrskaya railway. He was at the forefront of an illustrated magazine "RZD-Partner" in 1998 as a chairman of the editorial board. From May 1999 to May 2000, he worked as Deputy Minister of Railways and from 2000 to 2002 he was the First Deputy Head of the Moscow Railway. From February 2002 – 22 September 2003, he was the First Deputy Minister of Railways. He was appointed the MEA obligations on 23 September 2003.

On 29 June 2009, Morozov was promoted to the Moscow football club FC Lokomotiv to the board of directors.

He was co-chairman of the JSC "Russian Railways" since 2011, together with the Moscow Government working on the reconstruction and organization of passenger traffic on the small ring of the Moscow railway. Shortly after the arrival of the new president of the Russian Railways Oleg Belozyorov, Morozov, at his own request, was dismissed by the board of directors from office. He remained on the board of Russian Railways as a senior advisor to the president.

Commenting on Morozov's resignation, Belozyorov noted his professional qualities, but stressed the fundamental differences of opinion on management decisions. Followed by Morozov in September 2016, he became the chief editor of the newspaper "Gudok" left his protégé Aleksandr Retyunin.

=== Minister of Railways ===
On 7 October 2003, Morozov was approved as Minister of Railways of the Russian Federation. On 9 March 2004, Vladimir Putin signed a decree "On the system and structure of federal bodies of executive power", according to which the Ministry of Railways of the Russian Federation posts have been abolished. In July 2004, Morozov was made the executive director of the non-state pension fund "Welfare" (pensions of employees of JSC "Russian Railways"). On 17 August 2005, he was appointed First Vice-president of JSC "Russian Railways". In terms of the monthly fee Morozov has in this post from 4 to 6 million rubles per month.

== Personal life and death ==
Morozov was born on 24 June 1954, in the city of Volkhov, Leningrad Oblast. He died from COVID-19 in Moscow on 7 November 2021, aged 67, during the COVID-19 pandemic in Russia.

== Awards ==
- Honorary Badge "For merits in development of JSC" Russian Railways "degree (2015)
