= Bolotninsky District =

Bolotninsky District Болотнинский район (Russian)
- District
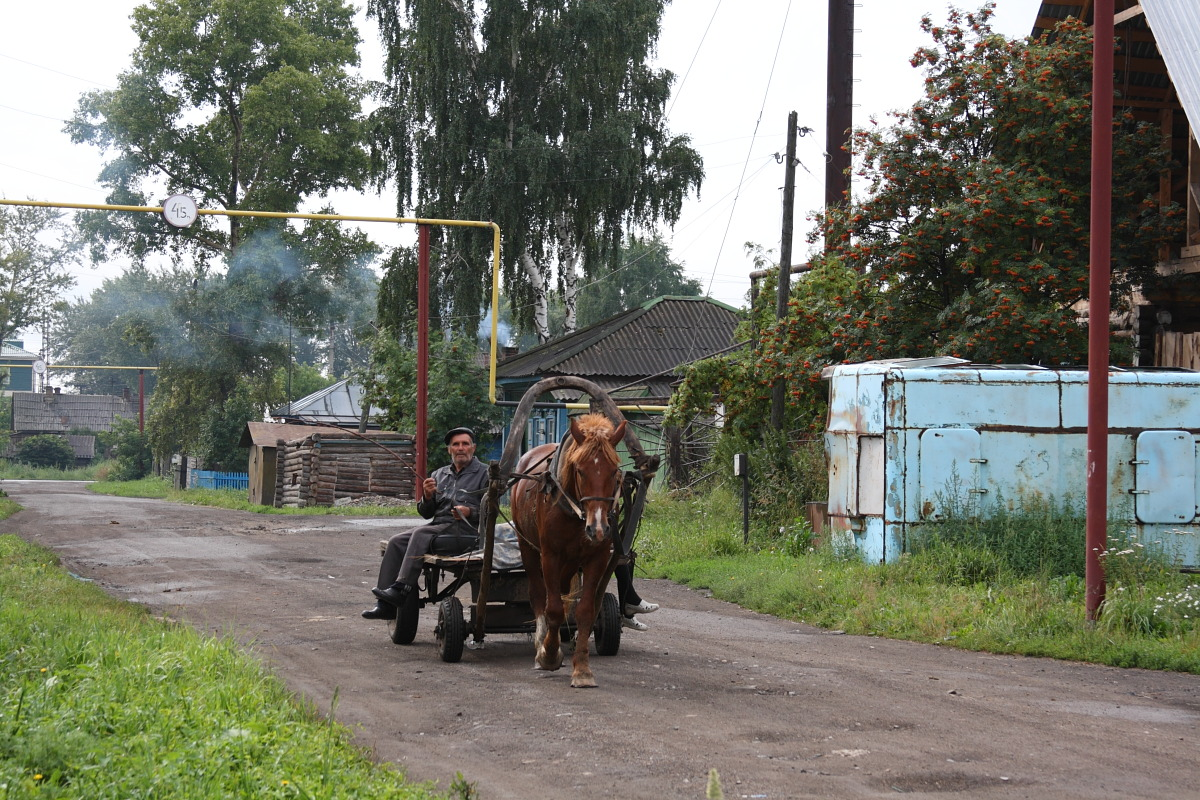
- Bolotnoye, Bolotninsky District

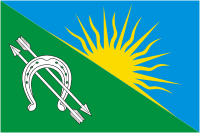
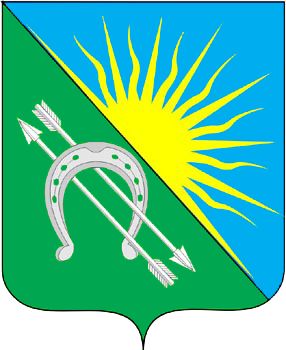
- Flag Coat of arms
- Location of Bolotninsky District in Novosibirsk Oblast
- Coordinates: 55°40′N 84°24′E
- Country: Russia
- Federal subject: Novosibirsk Oblast
- Established: 1925
- Administrative center: Bolotnoye

Area
  - Total: 3,400 km^{2} (1,300 sq mi)

Population (2010 Census)
  - Total: 29,365
  - Density: 8.6/km^{2} (22/sq mi)
  - Urban: 56.4%
  - Rural: 43.6%

Administrative structure
  - Inhabited localities: 1 cities/towns, 60 rural localities

Municipal structure
  - Municipally incorporated as: Bolotninsky Municipal District
  - Municipal divisions: 1 urban settlements, 14 rural settlements
- Time zone: UTC+7 (MSK+4)
- OKTMO ID: 50606000
- Website: http://bolotnoe.nso.ru/

Bolotninsky District (Russian: Боло́тнинский райо́н) is an administrative and municipal district (raion), one of the thirty in Novosibirsk Oblast, Russia. It is located in the northeast of the oblast. The area of the district is 3,400 square kilometers (1,300 sq mi). Its administrative center is the town of Bolotnoye. Population: 29,365 (2010 Census); 32,348 (2002 census); 36,236 (1989 Soviet census). The population of Bolotnoye accounts for 56.4% of the district's total population.

== Notable residents ==
- Nikolay Aksyonenko (1949–2005), railway manager and politician, born in Novoaleksandrovka

== Tourist attractions ==
- Saint Seraphim of Sarov Church
