= Anatoly Zaytsev (politician) =

Russian politician (1940–2022)

- Анатолий Зайцев

Minister of Railways
- In office 14 August 1996 – 14 April 1997
- Preceded by: Gennady Fadeyev
- Succeeded by: Nikolay Aksyonenko

Personal details
- Born: Anatoly Aleksandrovich Zaytsev; 6 February 1940 Oyatsky District, Leningrad Oblast, Russian SFSR, Soviet Union
- Died: 13 February 2022 (aged 82) Saint Petersburg, Russia
- Party: CPSU
- Education: Leningrad Institute of Railway Engineers

Anatoly Alexandrovich Zaytsev (Russian: Анато́лий Алекса́ндрович За́йцев; 6 February 1940 – 13 February 2022) was a Russian politician.

He served as Minister of Railways from 1996 to 1997. He died in Saint Petersburg on 13 February 2022, at the age of 82.

== Early life ==
He was born on 6 February 1940 in Kalinino, Oyatsky District, Leningrad Oblast, into a peasant family. From 1975 he worked as second then first secretary of Kandalaksha City Committee.
