= Korshunikha =

Korshunikha Коршуниха
- Village
- Location within Vladimir Oblast Location within Russia
- Coordinates: 56°13′N 41°57′E
- Country: Russia
- Region: Vladimir Oblast
- District: Vyaznikovsky District
- Time zone: UTC+3:00

Korshunikha (Russian: Коршуниха) is a rural locality (a village) in Oktyabrskoye Rural Settlement, Vyaznikovsky District, Vladimir Oblast, Russia. The population was 8 as of 2010.

== Geography ==
Korshunikha is located 14 km west of Vyazniki (the district's administrative centre) by road. Likhaya Pozhnya is the nearest rural locality.
