= Sputnik (train) =

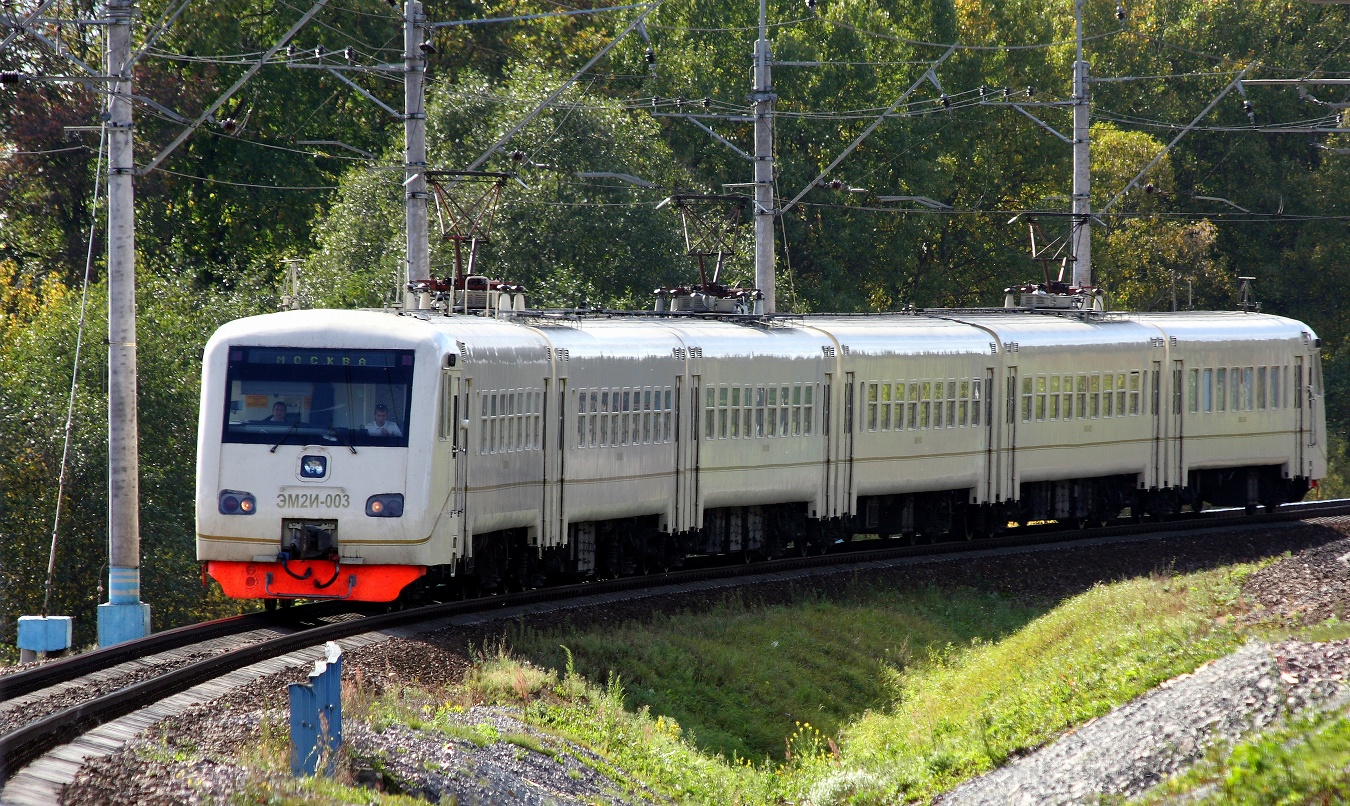
The Sputnik train

Moscow express electric train (also known "Sputnik") it is a regional electric multiple unit train service, that connects Moscow and the regions inside its oblast. Compared with conventional commuter trains, they move with a higher speed and fewer stops, which causes twice higher price. Work under the 7000 th numbering. On some routes the price is the same as a regular train (for example, to Novoperedelkino platform).

Depending on the direction, the tickets are sold in the hall either in their individual corner, or in the corner for all regional routes.

== Rolling stock ==
Usually operated by ED4 electric trainsets.
