= Saint Seraphim of Sarov Church, Turnaevo =

Saint Seraphim of Sarov Church
- Церковь преподобного Серафима Саровского
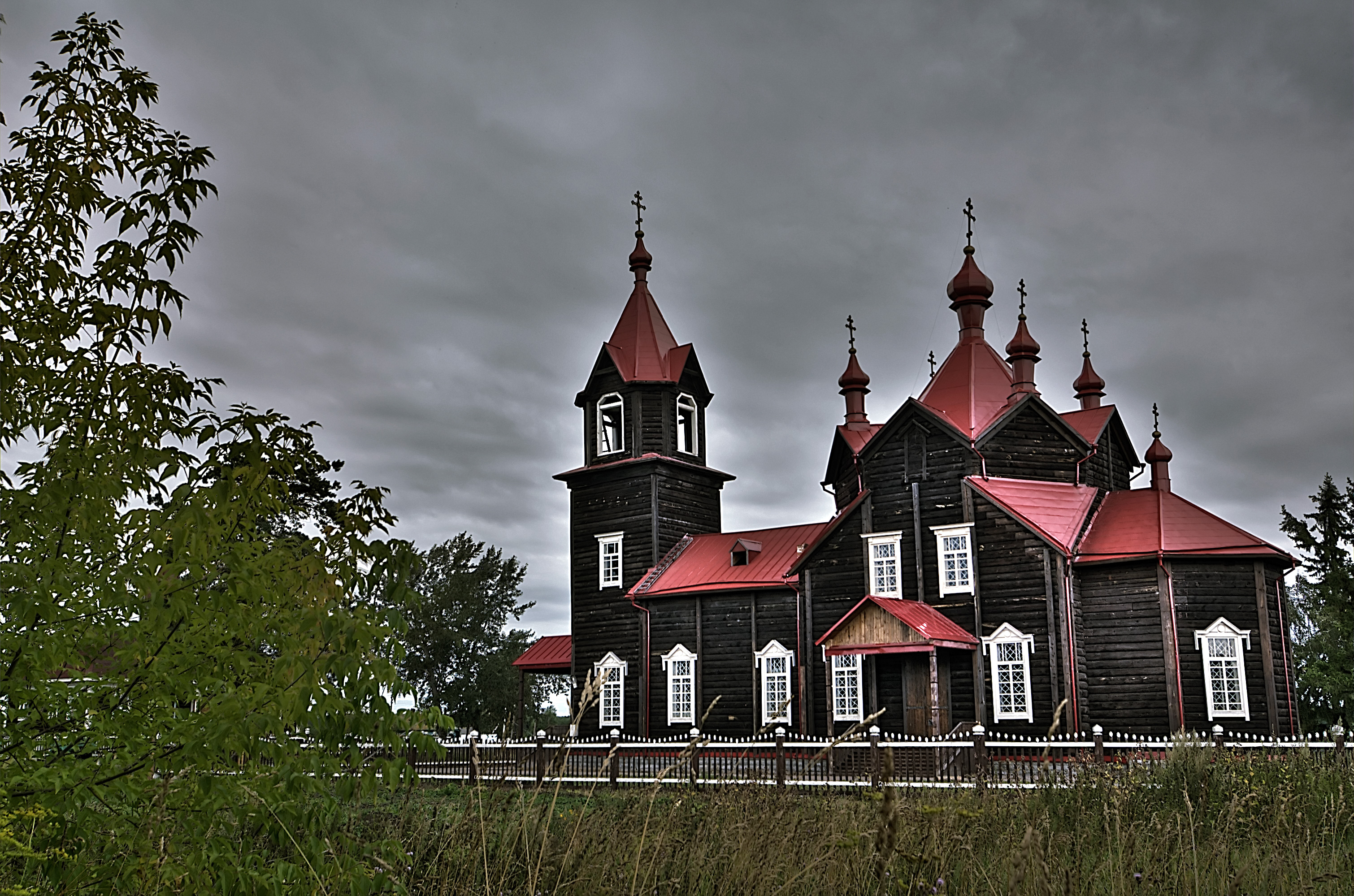
- Saint Seraphim of Sarov Church
- Location: Turnaevo
- Country: Russia

History
- Consecrated: 1914

Saint Seraphim of Sarov Church (Russian: Церковь преподобного Серафима Саровского) is a Russian Orthodox church in Turnaevo of Novosibirsk Oblast, Russia.

== History ==
The construction of the church began in 1912.

It was consecrated on September 14, 1914.
