= East Siberian Railway =

Railway in Russia

Coordinates: 52°17′08″N 104°14′46″E

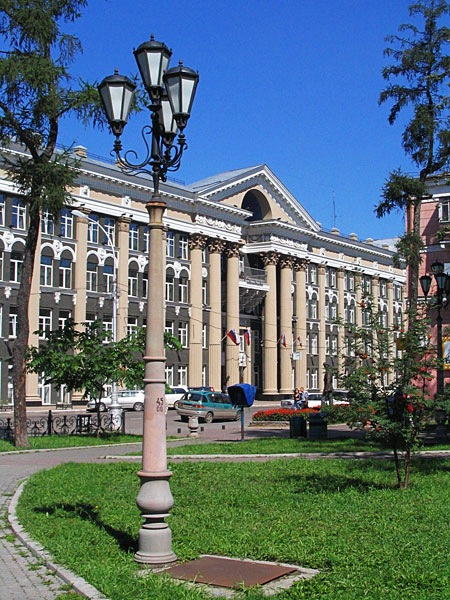
The administration of the East Siberian Railway in Irkutsk

The East Siberian Railway (Восточно-Сибирская железная дорога) is a railway in Russia (a branch of the Russian Railways and a part of the Trans-Siberian Railway), which runs across Irkutsk Oblast, Chita Oblast, Buryatia, and Yakutia. The railway administration is located in Irkutsk. The East Siberian Railway borders with the Krasnoyarsk Railway (railway station of Yurty), Trans-Baikal Railway (railway station of Petrovsky Zavod), and Baikal Amur Mainline (railway station of Lena-Vostochnaya). To the south, the East Siberian Railway runs close to the Russo-Mongolian border (railway station of Naushki). As of 2008, the total working length of the East Siberian Railway was 3,848.1 km (2,391.1 mi); number of employees – 46,233 (61,418 in 2005); net weight hauled – 76 million tonnes (75.934 million in 2005); long-distance passenger traffic – 3.6 million people (4.838 million in 2005); suburban traffic – 29 million people (26.225 million in 2005). Annual cargo turnover is 278 million tonnes.

The East Siberian Railway consists of four divisions: the Irkutsk Railway Division, Severobaikalsk Railway Division, Taishet Railway Division, and Ulan-Ude Railway Division. The railway connects the regions of East Siberia, Transbaikal, and Russian Far East with the rest of the railroad network nationwide. The East Siberian Railway services major industrial areas of iron ore and coal mining, oil refining, logging, and wood processing, companies and factories in energy, chemical, machine building and machine-tool industries, nonferrous metallurgy, etc. In addition, the railway services agricultural grain-producing and cattle-breeding regions. The biggest points of cargo departure and arrival are Cheremkhovo, Korshunikha, Kitoy-Kombinatskaya, Sukhovskaya, Irkutsk-Sortirovochniy, Ulan-Ude, Lena, and Bratsk.

== Construction history ==
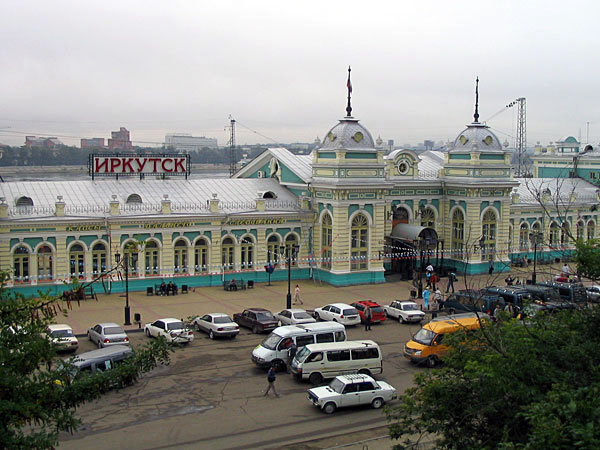
Irkutsk railway station

The idea of building a railway across sparsely populated and almost unexplored areas of East Siberia was first expressed in the 1870s–1880s. The need for constructing a railway line became particularly evident after the completion of the Ural Railway from Yekaterinburg to Tyumen in 1884. In 1887, three expeditions were organised to explore the route for the future Trans-Siberian Railway. In May 1893, the Committee for the Construction of the Siberian Railway was created. The construction of the Trans-Siberian Railway was launched simultaneously from its two extremities, namely Vladivostok and Chelyabinsk. By 1895, the construction of the section of railway from Chelyabinsk to the railway station of Ob near the small settlement of Novonikolaevsky (today's Novosibirsk) was complete. On December 6, 1895 the first train arrived at Krasnoyarsk, which would become a starting point for the construction of the East Siberian Railway towards Irkutsk and through Nizhneudinsk (the first train arrived on December 9, 1897) towards Tulun. In 1897, the construction of the Irkutsk–Baikalsky and Mysovaya–Sretensk sections was under way. Railway stations were built along almost the whole of the railway. In 1898 the construction of the Tulun-Irkutsk section was finished. In 1900 the Transbaikal sections from Mysovaya to Sretensk and from Irkutsk to the Baikal railway station were completed. The Circum–Baikal section (between the railway stations Mysovaya and Baikal) of the East Siberian Railway was under construction until 1905, opening non-stop train traffic along the whole railway when construction ended.

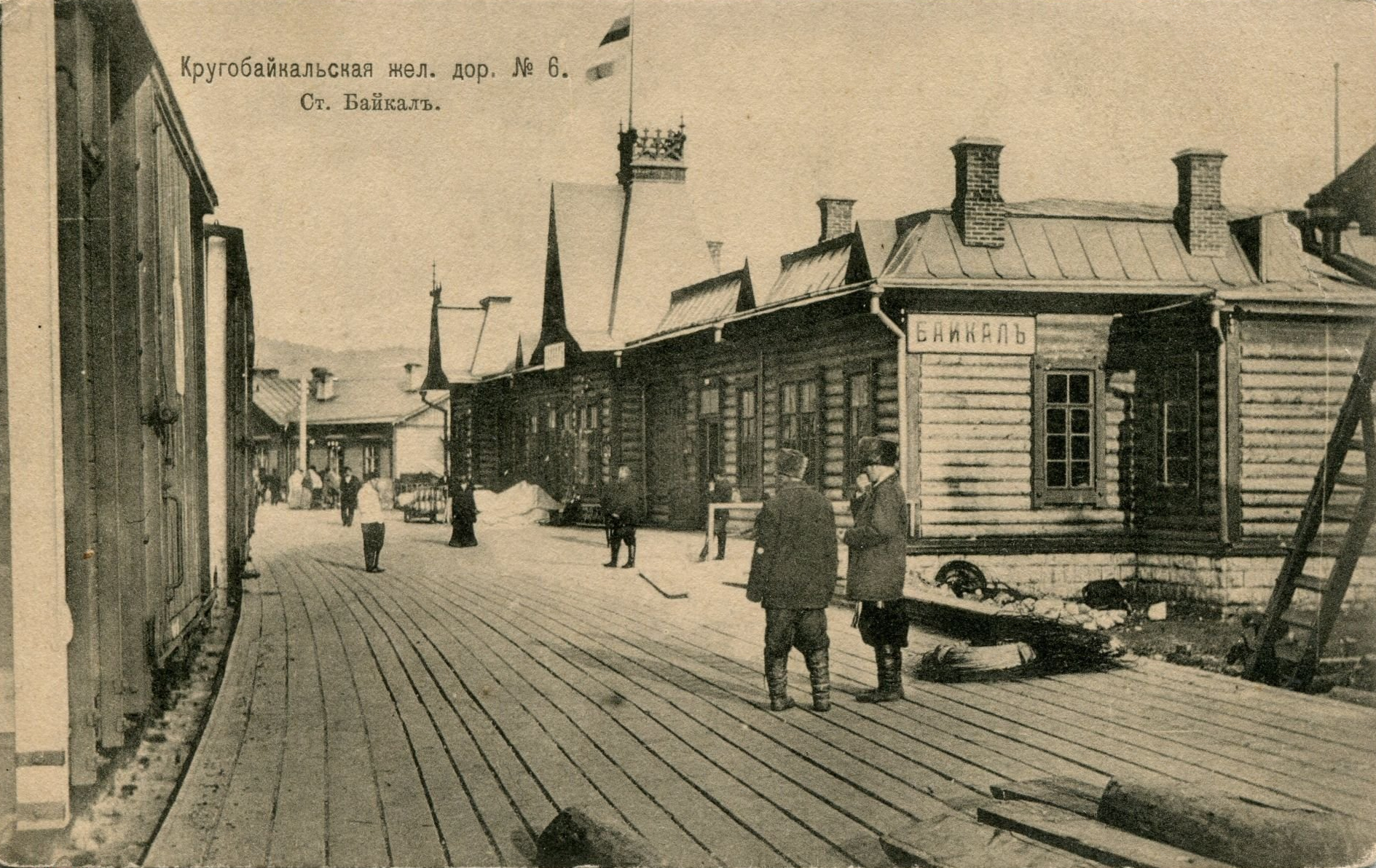
Baikal station in the early 20th century

At first, the East Siberian Railway was a single-track railroad. In 1907, they began the construction of the second track, which would end in 1916. Administratively, the main line was divided into four railways: the Siberian Railway (from Chelyabinsk to Innokentyevskaya railway station with a line towards Tomsk), the Transbaikal Railway (from Innokentyevskaya railway station to Sretensk with a line towards Manchuria railway station), the Ussuri Railway (from Vladivostok to Khabarovsk), and the Amur Railway (from Kuyenga railway station to Khabarovsk). In 1915, the East Siberian Railway was divided into five railways, the Omsk Railway, Tomsk Railway, Transbaikal Railway, Amur Railway, and Ussuri Railway. In 1934, the East Siberian Railway became an independent administrative and economic unit extending from Mariinsk railway station to Mysovaya railway station. In 1936, the Krasnoyarsk Railway was excluded from the East Siberian Railway. In the 1920s–1930s, technical reconstruction of the railway was carried out and its locomotive and rolling stock were upgraded. Several new lines were also built over the ridges of Sayany, Alatau, taiga, and swamps towards coal and iron ore deposits, woodlands, and banks of large rivers. In 1922–1926, the Achinsk–Abakan line was constructed, which connected the southern areas of Krasnoyarsk Krai, Khakassia, and Tuva with other economic regions of the country. In 1940, train traffic began from Ulan-Ude to Naushki, significantly improving economic relations with Mongolia and providing access to the Gusinoozyorsk coal deposits.

During the Great Patriotic War, the authorities of the East Siberian Railway provided volunteer units to be dispatched to the front (20 railmen would be awarded the title of Hero of the Soviet Union), found resources for repairing military equipment, prepared rolling stock, and gradually increased the amount of freight from Siberia to the European part of the country.

In the post-war years, the amount of traffic carried continued its increase along with the reconstruction of transportation facilities and introduction of new technology. In 1948 the East Siberian Railway reached its pre-war loading and cargo-turnover level. In 1958 they commissioned the new Taishet-Bratsk-Lena railway, which connected the basins of the Angara and Lena Rivers with the rest of the Siberian railroad network, providing immediate access to mineral deposits in the Angara basin (e.g. the Korshunovskoye iron ore deposit) and abundant logging regions and ensuring an uninterrupted supply of cargo to the northern areas of Irkutsk Oblast and Yakutia. At the end of 1965, a 647 km (402 mi) long Abakan-Taishet section of the East Siberian Railway was commissioned, an electrified high-class railroad with modern means of communication, electric interlocking of railroad switches, and a remote dispatching system. This section of the railway provided a new access to the Kuzbass, Kazakhstan, and Central Asia from the regions of the Russian Far East and Siberia. The early 1970s saw the completion of construction of the northbound line from the Khrebtovaya railway station to Ust-Ilimsk Hydroelectric Powerplant (214 km or 133 mi).

== Cargo types ==
As far as transit cargo is concerned, the largest components of this are ferrous metals, petroleum products, grain shipments, and products of the light, food, chemical, and machine-building industries. Imported goods usually consist of metals, construction materials, petroleum products, the products of the machine building, light and food industries, also partially of grain shipments. Exports consist of timber, oil, iron ore, aluminium, and coal. Locally, the railway mostly transports construction goods, coal, timber, petroleum and agricultural produce. The East Siberian Railway was awarded the Order of the Red Banner of Labour in 1976.

== Engineering ==
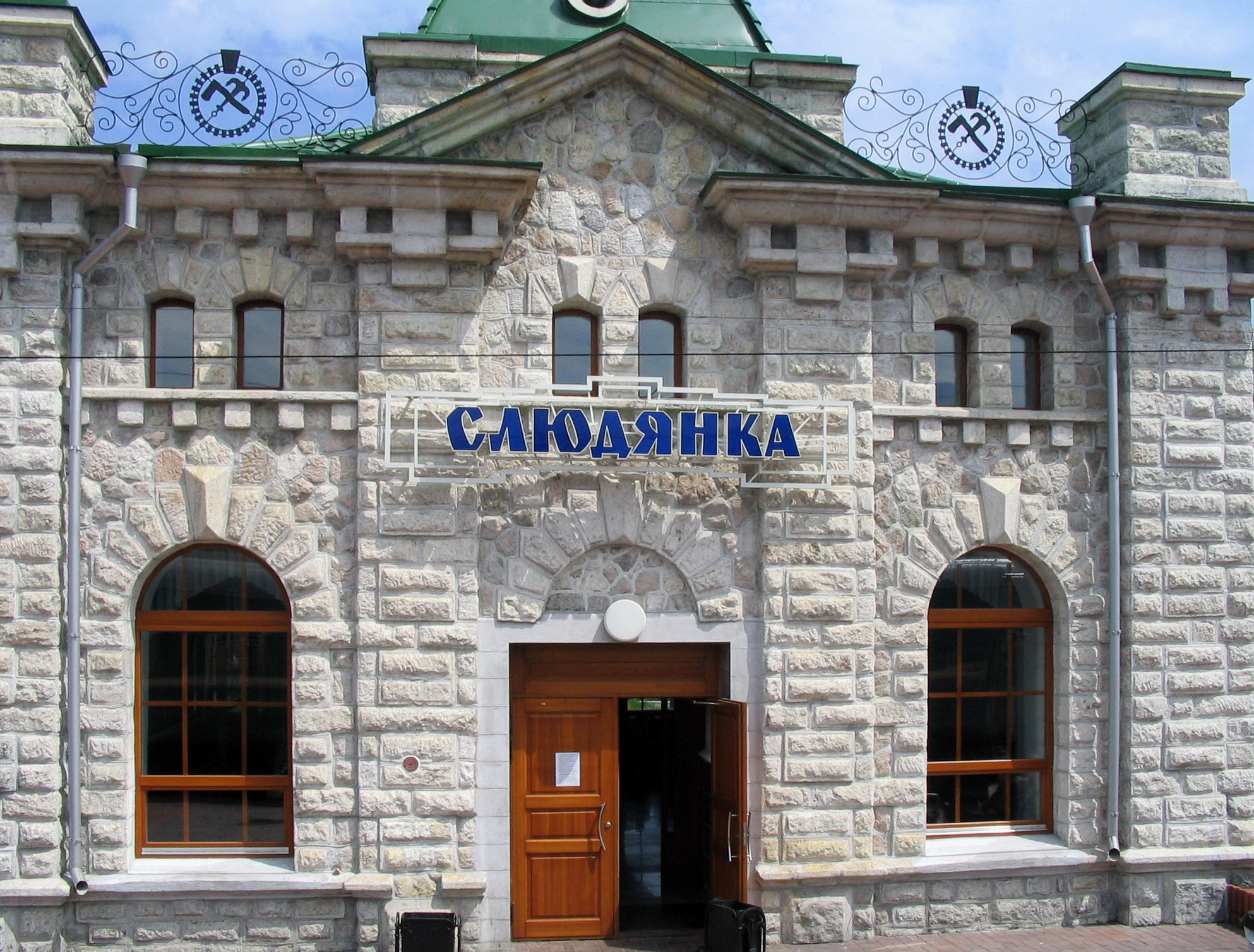
Railway station in Slyudyanka

During the construction of several sections of the East Siberian Railway, various scientific and technical achievements were widely used. The railway essentially became a test site for alternating current electrification. They tested and perfected the design of alternating current locomotives, overhead catenary system, means of communication, signaling, centralised traffic control and the automatic block system, all of which would later be introduced on other railways in one way or another. 97% of the traffic along the East Siberian Railway is done by means of electric traction.

The East Siberian Railway consists of several sections, one of which is the Circum-Baikal Railway – a monument to industrial architecture of federal importance. It stretches for over 85 km (53 mi) from the Baikal railway station to the Kultuka railway station. The uniqueness of this wonder of engineering is that no other railway in the world has as many man-made objects, namely 40 tunnels, 16 avalanche galleries, 470 overpasses, bridges, and pipe culverts, some 280 protecting walls, let alone various buildings at different railway stations. The Circum-Baikal Railway is also known as the "golden buckle of the steel belt" (the Trans-Siberian Railway being the "steel belt") because the construction of the greatest Russian railway was finished on the shores of Lake Baikal.

In December 2003 the Severomuysky Tunnel on the Baikal–Amur mainline (a section of the East Siberian Railway) was commissioned, the longest tunnel in Russia and the fifth-longest in the world (15,343 m or 9.534 mi).

The station building at Slyudyanka railway station of the East Siberian Railway is the only railway station in the world made completely of marble.
