= Kukhterin Lug =

Kukhterin Lug Кухтерин Луг
- Selo
- Location within Amur Oblast Location within Russia
- Coordinates: 52°25′N 128°06′E
- Country: Russia
- Region: Amur Oblast
- District: Shimanovsky District
- Time zone: UTC+9:00

Kukhterin Lug (Russian: Кухтерин Луг) is a rural locality (a selo) in uralovsky Selsoviet of Shimanovsky District, Amur Oblast, Russia. The population was 17 as of 2018. There are 3 streets.

== Geography ==
Kukhterin Lug is located on the Zeya River, 588 km northeast of Shimanovsk (the district's administrative centre) by road. Uralovka is the nearest rural locality.
