= Bolotnoye =

Town in Novosibirsk Oblast, Russia

Bolotnoye Болотное
- Town
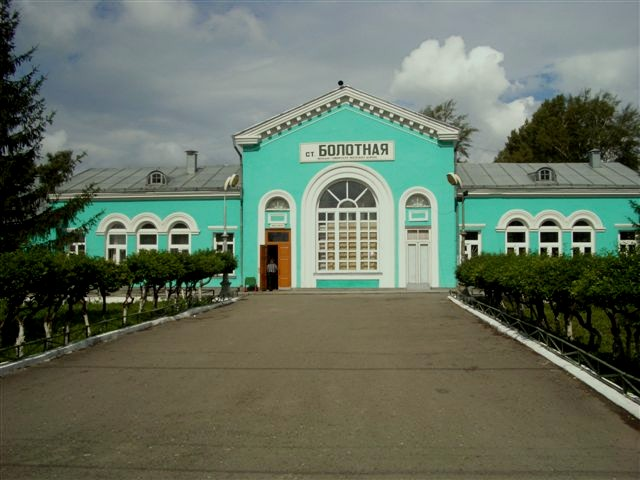
- Bolotnaya railway station in Bolotnoye

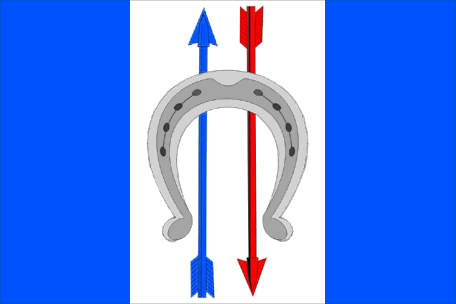
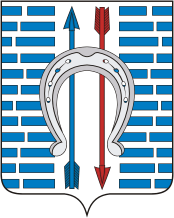
- Flag Coat of arms
- Interactive map of Bolotnoye
- Location of Bolotnoye Bolotnoye (Novosibirsk Oblast)
- Coordinates: 55°41′N 84°25′E
- Country: Russia
- Federal subject: Novosibirsk Oblast
- Administrative district: Bolotninsky District
- TownSelsoviet: Bolotnoye
- Founded: 1805
- Town status since: 1943
- Elevation: 200 m (660 ft)

Population (2010 Census)
  - Total: 16,570
  - Estimate (2021): 15,644 (−5.6%)

Administrative status
  - Capital of: Bolotninsky District, Town of Bolotnoye

Municipal status
  - Municipal district: Bolotninsky Municipal District
  - Urban settlement: Bolotnoye Urban Settlement
  - Capital of: Bolotninsky Municipal District, Bolotnoye Urban Settlement
- Time zone: UTC+7 (MSK+4)
- Postal codes: 633340, 633343
- OKTMO ID: 50606101001

Bolotnoye (Russian: Боло́тное, lit. swampy) is a town and the administrative center of Bolotninsky District in Novosibirsk Oblast, Russia, located 126 kilometers (78 mi) northeast of Novosibirsk, the administrative center of the oblast. Population: 16,570 (2010 census); 18,170 (2002 census); 20,006 (1989 Soviet census).

== History ==
Bolotnoye began with the establishment of a way station along the Siberian Route at the town's present location, in 1805. By 1896, when the Trans-Siberian Railway had reached the same location, the area was known as Bolotnovskaya. A railway station with buffet service was established there and development of an accompanying settlement began in earnest. The name was later shortened to Bolotnoye. Bolotnoye was officially granted town status only in 1943.

== Administrative and municipal status ==
Within the framework of administrative divisions, Bolotnoye serves as the administrative center of Bolotninsky District. As an administrative division, it is incorporated within Bolotninsky District as the Town of Bolotnoye. As a municipal division, the Town of Bolotnoye is incorporated within Bolotninsky Municipal District as Bolotnoye Urban Settlement.
