= Krasnoyarsk railway station =

Railway station in Krasnoyarsk, Russia

Krasnoyarsk Красноярск
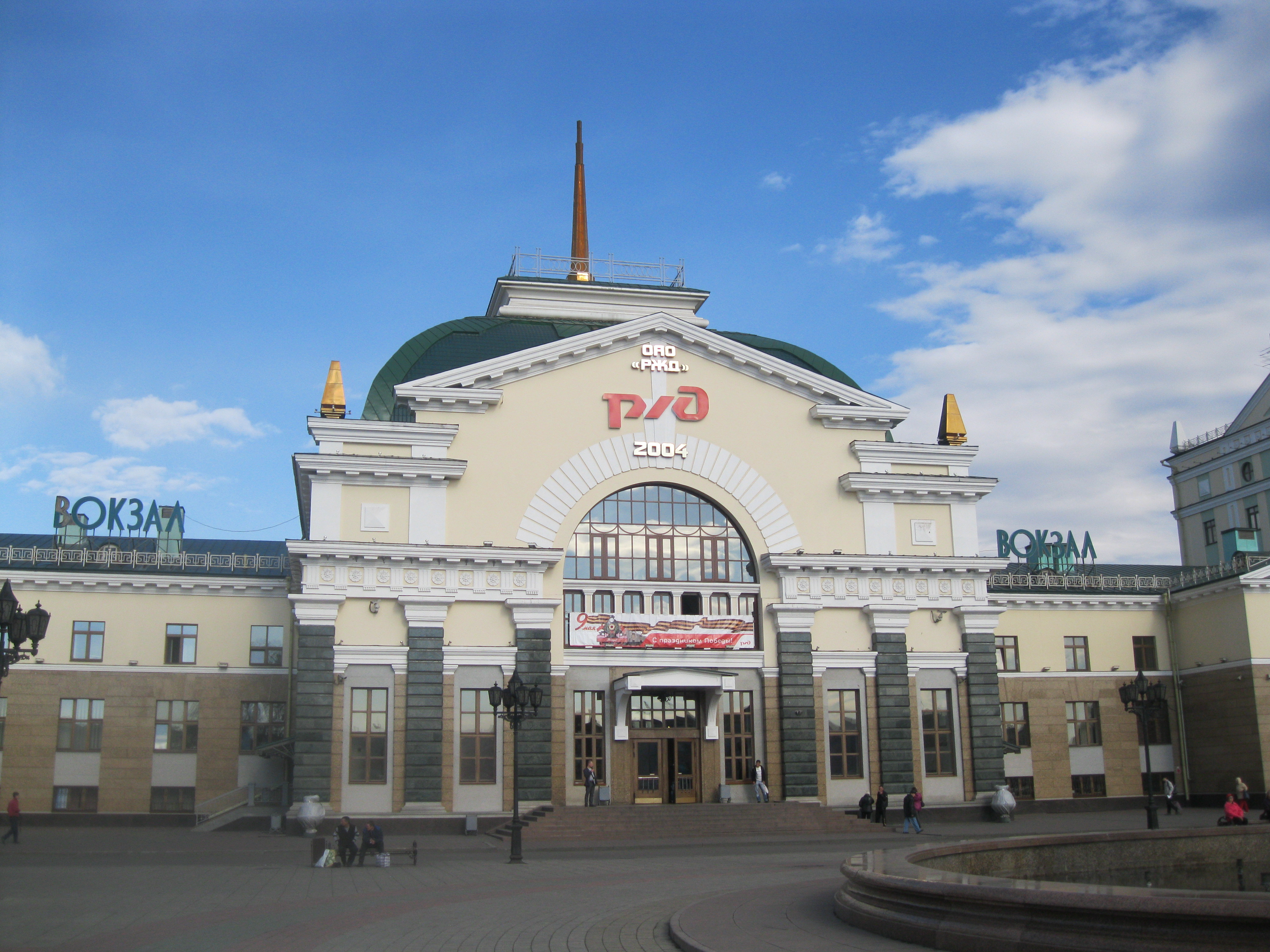
- View of the station from the street.

General information
- Location: Russia, Krasnoyarsk
- Coordinates: 56.0058°N 92.8293°E
- System: Krasnoyarsk Railway terminal
- Owner: Russian Railways (Krasnoyarsk Railway)
- Line: Achinsk—Yenisey
- Platforms: 4 (3 island platforms)
- Tracks: 6

Construction
- Parking: yes

Other information
- Station code: 890004

History
- Opened: 1895
- Rebuilt: 2004
- Electrified: yes, AC ~25 kV

Services
Preceding station	Krasnoyarsk Railway	Following station
Location

Krasnoyarsk–Passazhirsky (Russian: Красноярск–Пассажирский, lit. Krasnoyarsk-Passenger) is the main railway station of Krasnoyarsk in Russia. It is located 4,098 kilometres (2,546 mi) from Moscow.

== History ==
The first train arrived at Krasnoyarsk on 6 December 1895 at two o'clock. The first building of the railway station was built in 1895 by the architect Nikolai Solovyov.

The second station was built in 1961.

In 2003 reconstruction of the station started.

== Destinations ==
=== Major Domestic Routes ===
- Moscow — Vladivostok
- Novosibirsk — Vladivostok
- Moscow — Khabarovsk
- Moscow — Neryungri
- Moscow — Ulan Ude
- Adler — Krasnoyarsk
- Anapa — Krasnoyarsk
- Moscow — Krasnoyarsk
- Adler — Irkutsk
- Adler — Severobaikalsk

=== International ===
Train number	Train name	Destination	Operated by
001М/002Щ	Rossiya; Россия	(Russia) Moscow (Yaroslavsky) (Russia) Vladivostok (cars: (North Korea) Pyongyang, (North Korea) Tumangang)	(Russia) Russian Railways
003З/004З		(Russia) Moscow (Yaroslavsky) (China) Beijing (Main); Runs through Mongolia	China Railway
005Щ/006Щ		(Russia) Moscow (Yaroslavsky) (Mongolia) Ulaanbaatar (cars: (Mongolia) Erdenet)	(Russia) Russian Railways (Mongolia) Ulaanbataar Railway
019Ч/020Щ	Vostok; Восток	(Russia) Moscow (Yaroslavsky) (China) Beijing (Main)	(Russia) Russian Railways

== Gallery ==
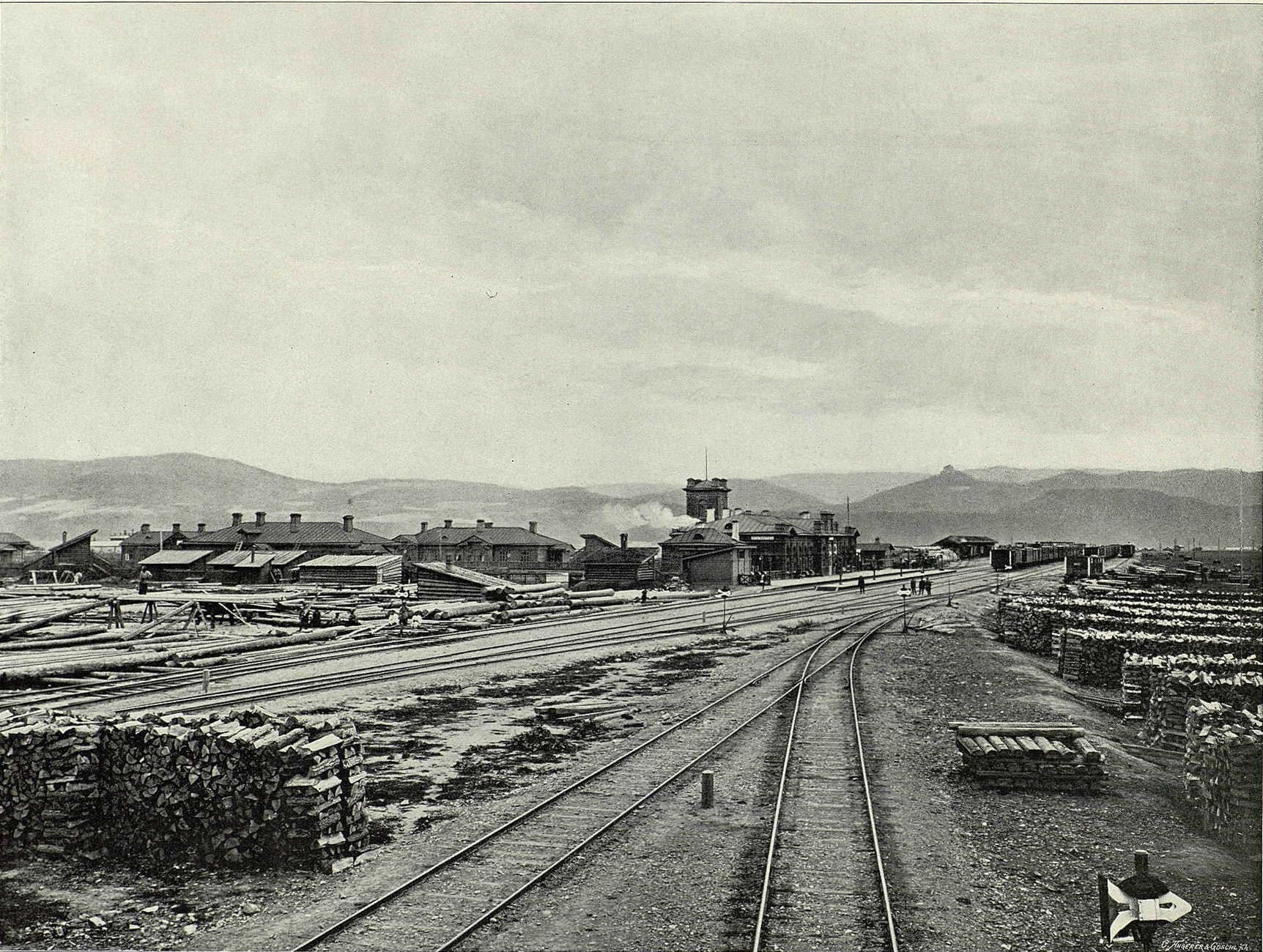
The station in 1899

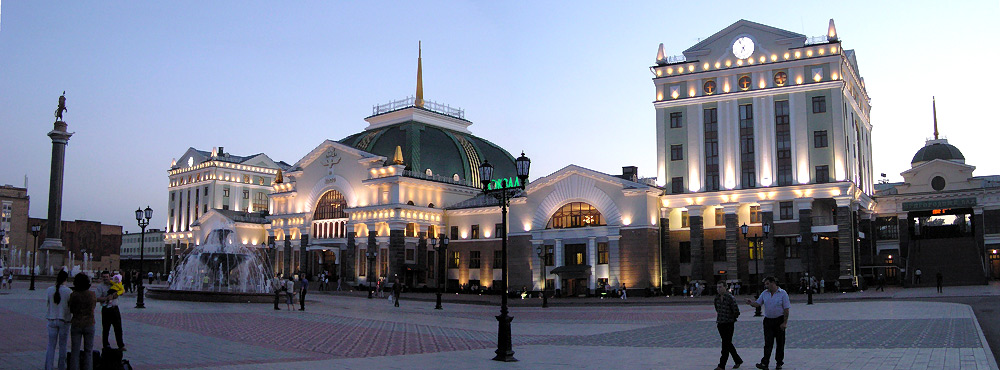
The station in 2009

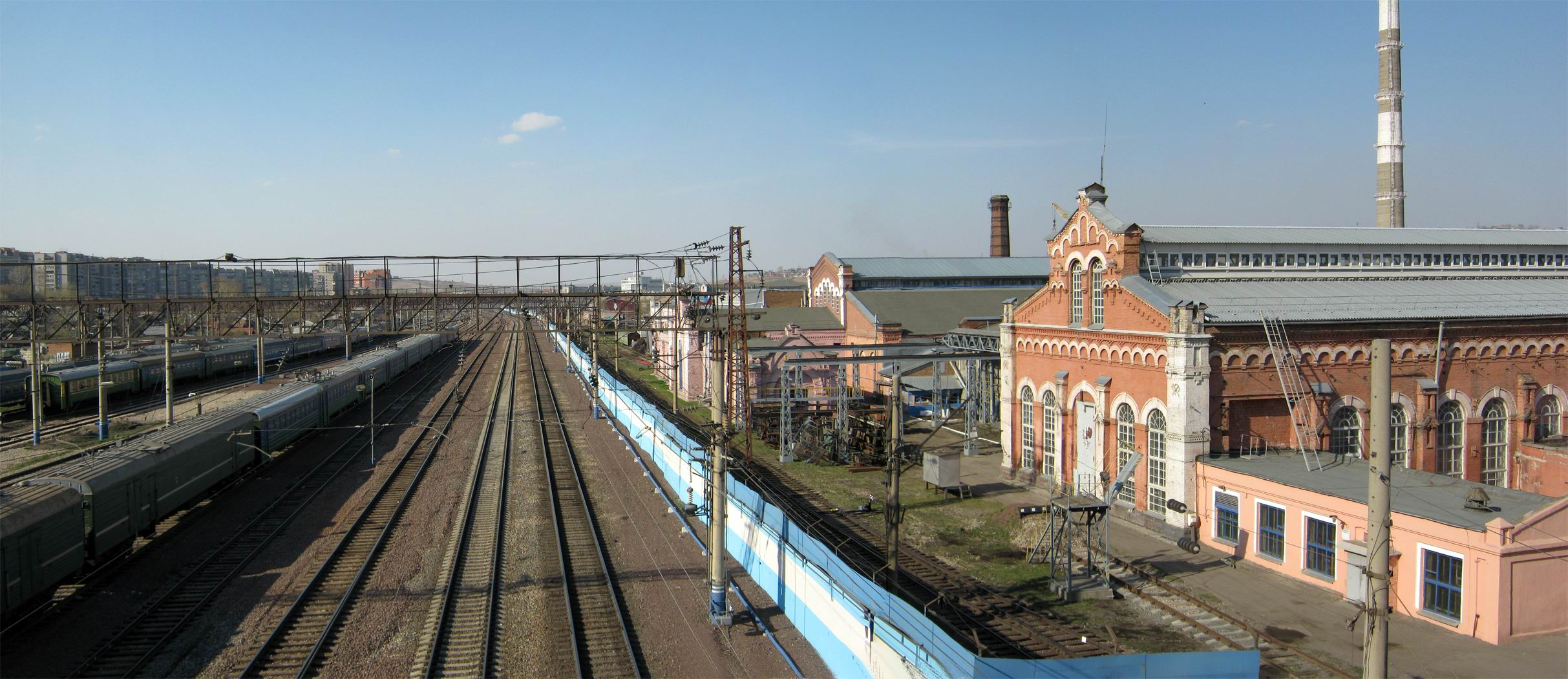
The northern part of the station

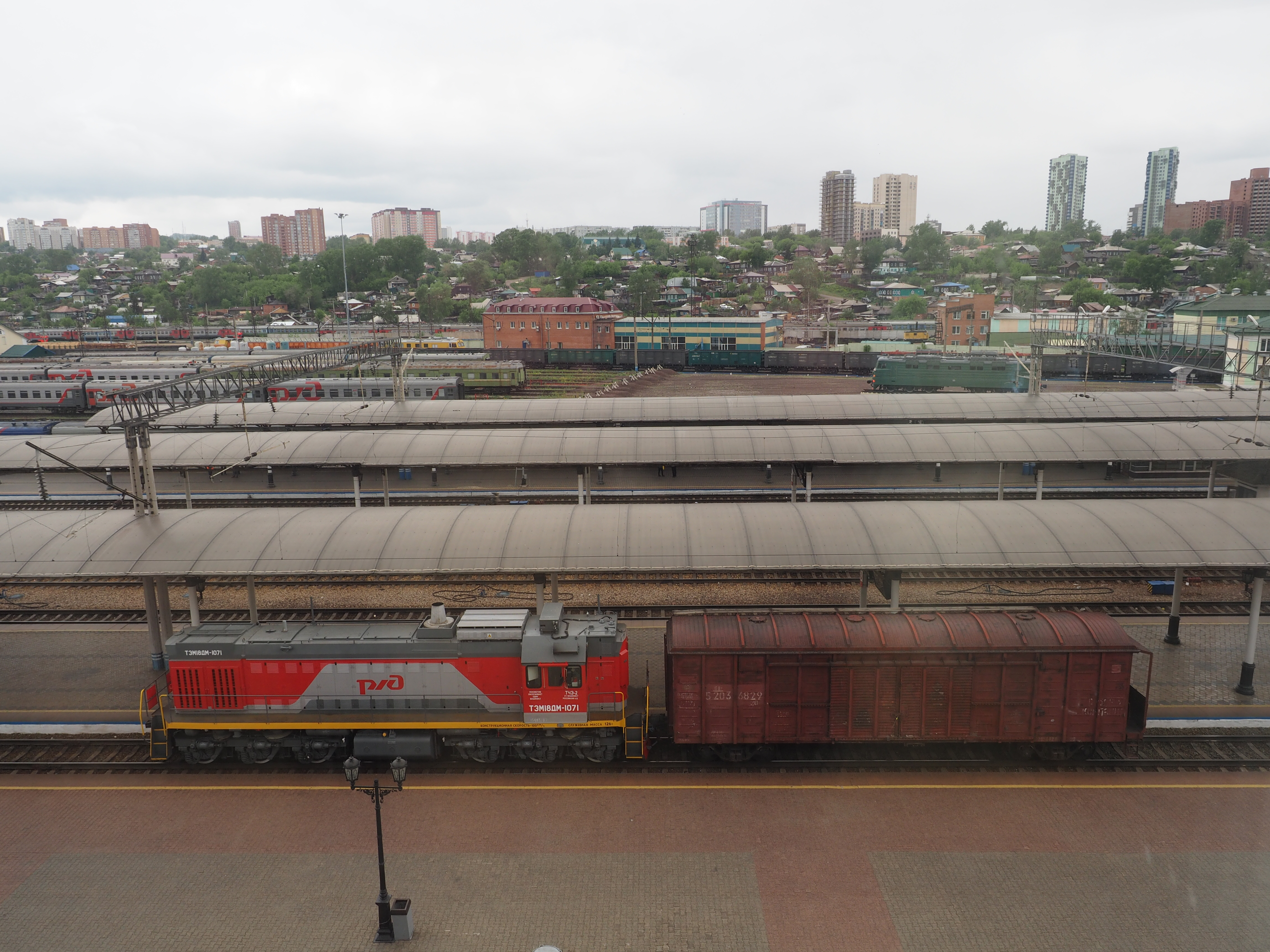
View of the station opposite its station

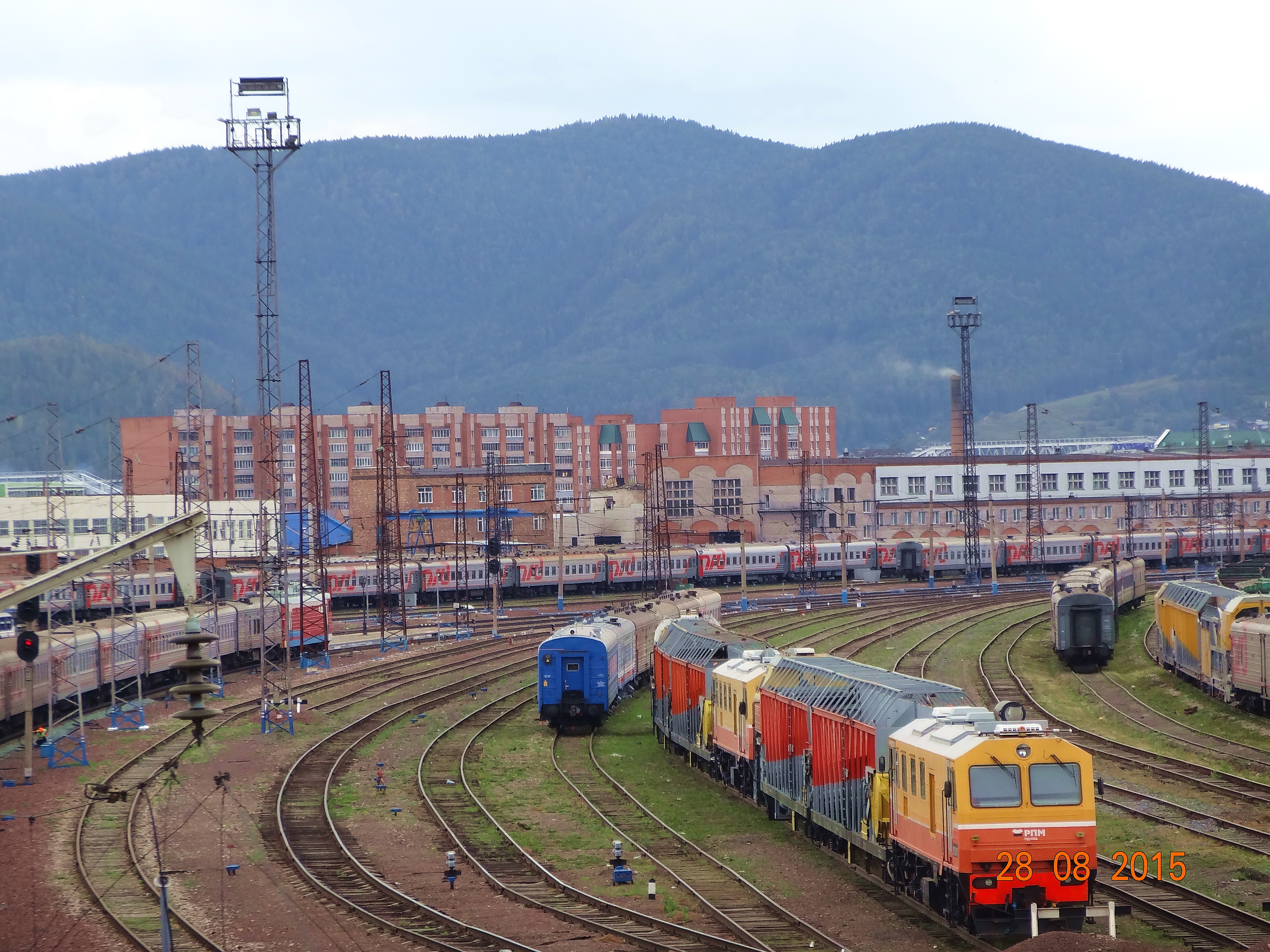
Krasnoyarsk rails in 2015

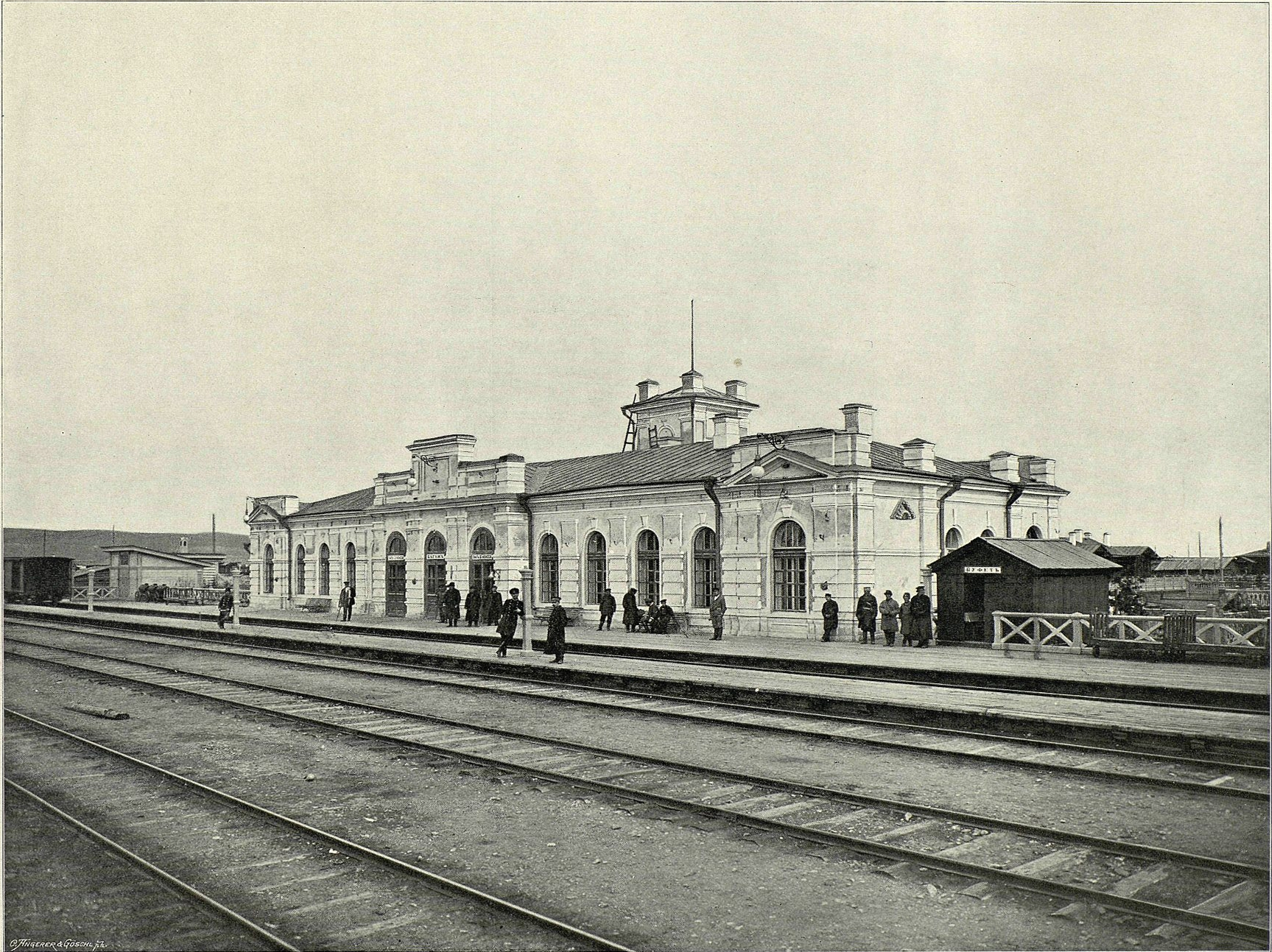
The station in 1899
