= Oleg Belozyorov =

Russian politician (born 1969)

- Олег Белозёров
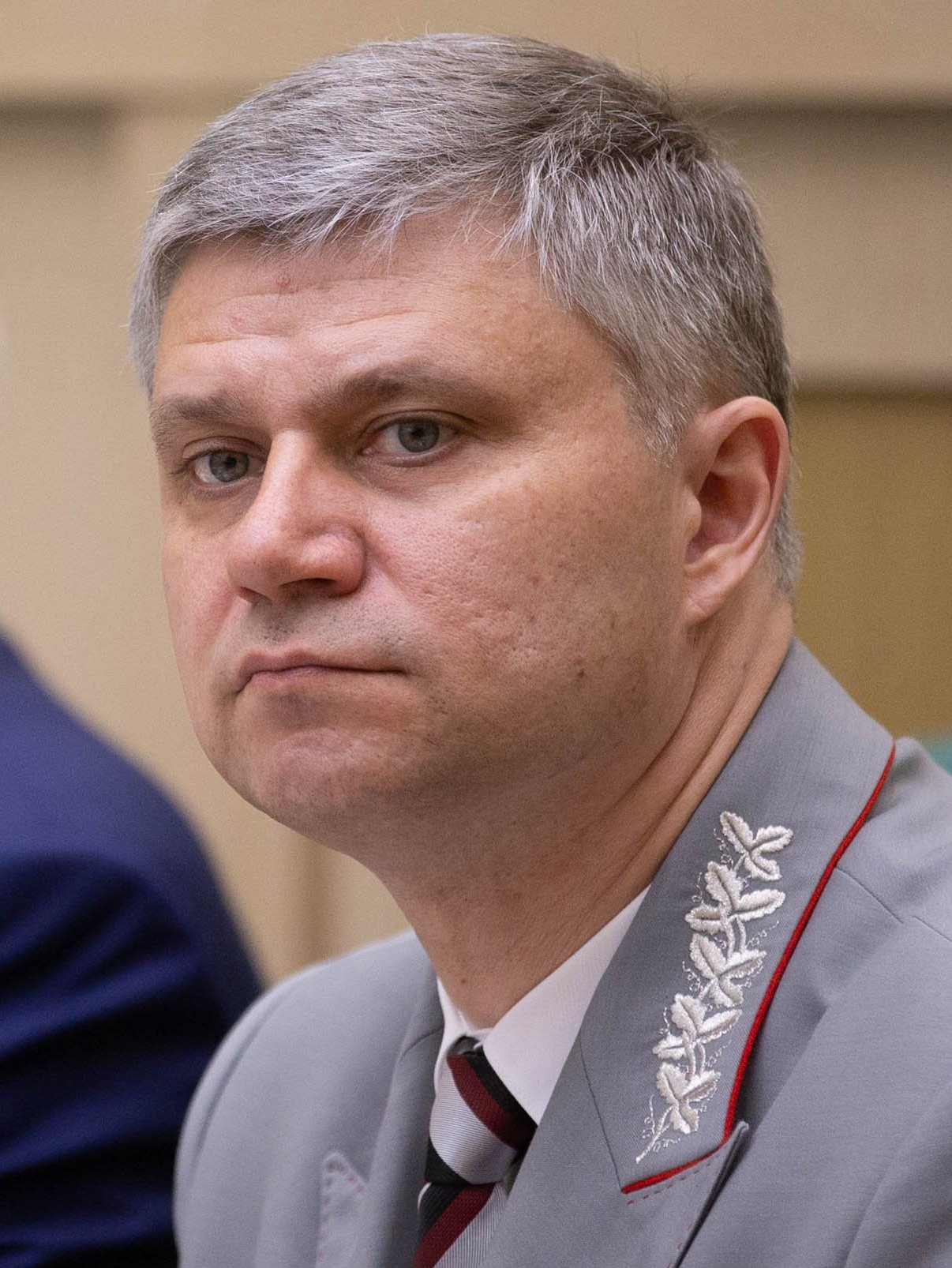
- Belozyorov in 2018

CEO of Russian Railways
- Incumbent
- Assumed office 25 August 2015
- Preceded by: Vladimir Yakunin

First Deputy Minister of Transport
- In office 11 May 2015 – 25 August 2015

Deputy Minister of Transport
- In office 17 March 2009 – 11 May 2015

Head of the Federal Road Agency
- In office 9 September 2004 – 17 March 2009

Personal details
- Born: Oleg Valentinovich Belozyorov; 26 September 1969 (age 56) Ventspils, Latvian SSR, Soviet Union
- Education: Candidate of Sciences

Oleg Valentinovich Belozyorov (Russian: Оле́г Валенти́нович Белозёров; born on 26 September 1969) is a Latvian-born Russian politician and manager. He has been president of Russian Railways since August 2015.

He was First Deputy Minister of Transport of the Russian Federation (2015); Deputy Minister of Transport of the Russian Federation (2009–2015); and the head of the Russian Federal Road Agency (2004–2009).

He has the federal state civilian service rank of 1st class Active State Councillor of the Russian Federation.

== School and college years ==
Oleg Belozyorov was born on 26 September 1969 in Ventspils, Latvian SSR in the family physicians of city polyclinic. His father, Valentin Borisovich Belozyorov, worked as a radiologist, his mother, Leonila Kirillovna Belozerova a neurologist. He studied at the School of Ventspils number 2. During his school years he was fond of athletics seriously, preferring to sprint running and long jump. After graduating from school in 1986, he entered the university in Leningrad.

Since childhood, regularly made the 4-hour trip by train between Ventspils and Riga (180 km). As a student – on the night express train travel between St. Petersburg and Riga; since then it nourishes sympathy for the railroad.

As a young man fond of travel, he walked Latvian medieval castles. He served in the army in the Murmansk region, on the border with Norway, then left.

In 1992, he graduated from St. Petersburg State University of Economics and Finance with a degree in economics, planning industry. From the fourth year, he began working in the youth scientific-technical center – the forge of future entrepreneurs.

== Careers in St. Petersburg and Moscow ==
From 1998 to 2000 he worked in Saint Petersburg and successively held the posts of Deputy Commercial Director, Commercial Director, Head of the Department of Logistics and Transport. Starting to earn decently, his parents bought an apartment on Vasilevsky Island.

In 2000 he worked as deputy director of cargo motor transport enterprise, number 21.

In 2000–2001, he became the chief of the financial and economic department of the Russian President's plenipotentiary representative of the unit in the North-West Federal District.

From 2001 to 2002, he was the deputy director of the management of corporate assets LOMO.

In 2002–2004, he was the general director of the Russian fuel company.

From July to November 2004, he was promoted as deputy head of the Federal Road Agency.

In 2005, at the St. Petersburg State University of Economics and Finance, he defended his thesis on "Organization of logistics supply chain into a vertically-integrated structures of corporate type", candidate of economic sciences.

On 9 November 2004, he was promoted the head of the Federal Road Agency, until 17 March 2009.

From 17 March 2009 to 11 May 2015, he was the Deputy Minister of Transport of the Russian Federation. In this capacity, he oversaw national importance projects, in particular the APEC summit in Vladivostok, the Universiade in Kazan. Since July 2014, he became member of the Board of Directors of Russian Railways.

From 11 May to 20 August 2015 he was the First Deputy Minister of Transport of the Russian Federation.

=== Sanctions ===
In December 2022 the US sanctioned Oleg Belozyorov.

He was sanctioned by the UK government in 2022 in relation to Russo-Ukrainian War.

== Activities in the Russian Railways ==
Since August 2015, he has been the president of the Russian Railways. Announcing the appointment Belozerov, Russian Prime Minister Dmitry Medvedev has demanded that the new head of the holding lead Railways budget and investments in line with the current state of the Russian economy and the real income of the company, to reduce corporate costs by 10%, to bring order to the passenger transportation. The Belozyorov contract includes five key indicators of the company. On 28 September 2015 the Prime Minister proposed to relieve the company from the non-core assets – the football club "FC Lokomotiv Moscow" and corporate TV "RZD-TV.". However, taking into account the wishes of President Putin's counter-holding Railways found opportunities to save resources, while continuing to support the corporate health and sport, in particular the railway hospitals and clinics, football and hockey club "Lokomotiv". It was noted that the head of the company he willingly attends matches of these teams, and in case of success even comes into the locker room for athletes. Belozyorov reserves and has sought to continue the broadcasts RZD-TV.

Belozyorov started an activity in a new field with personnel changes in the company, having concerned the first vice-president and vice-presidents. The priority directions of its work called cost reduction, optimization, energy efficiency, innovation. He promotes the idea that the tariffs for transportation of goods consignors (indexed by the Russian government in 2016 to 9%) ranged in one direction or another, depending on fluctuations in the market prices of transported goods. It aims to develop piggyback, to increase the share of transport in containers. Reductions in investment Railways on the initiative Belozyorov touched railway bypass of Krasnodar, Eastern landfill projects – BAM Trans, as well as some others, abbreviations provided in the administrative apparatus of the company. In June 2016 the head of the unit Railways and Administrative Department merged into the administrative and organizational unit with a reduction in the number of employees by 10%. Since 2016, the Russian Railways refused to purchase Japanese rails and placed orders for Russian enterprises "Evraz" and "Mechel". A new impetus when Belozerov received the first high-speed project in Russia. 19 January 2016 published an updated network schedule for the construction of high-speed rail line Moscow – Kazan, according to which the line is due to open regular train traffic in 2021. The key event of the railway in 2016 was the launch in September within the Moscow ring highway passenger Moscow Central Circle.

In January 2016 at a conference in the Railways Belozyorov he raised the issue of improper procurement of expensive cars functionaries subsidiaries of the company. The subsequent dismissal of the heads of "daughters" Railways – General Director of "TransTeleCom" Kudryavtseva and chief "Roszheldorsnab" G. Gorbunova edition Lenta.ru associated with starting "cleansing in the ranks of heads of Russian Railways". There might be some corruption for lobbying orders for wards companies, general patronage and conflict of interest in August 2016 dismissed the chief of Volga Railroad, A. Khrapaty.

The most important facts first year Belozyorov activities Railways Interfax called the shift a significant part of senior management, including the First Vice-President Vadim Morozov, who refused to infrastructure subsidies, providing benefits for the summer travel schoolchildren and students, and benefits to reduce the burden on the industry from 9% cent indexation of freight tariffs. The carrying value of the company Russian Railways, the privatization of which is under discussion, Belozyorov in May 2016 estimated in the range of 2 to 4.5 trillion rubles, the market – many times higher.

On 9 November 2016 Belozerov reported to Russian President Putin that the Russian Railways expenses for the year as a result of optimization of the costs reduced by 100 billion rubles.

In 2017 Belozerov was named Chief Executive Officer and Chairman of the Executive Board.

At the end of 2020, Belozerov declared an income of 213.9 million rubles.

== Family ==
- Father – Valentin Borisovich Belozerov (born in 1936)
- Mother – Leonila Kirillovna Belozerova (born in 1937)
- Wife first marriage (since 1994) – Olga Belozerova, now a housewife
- Son – Matvei (born 18 November 1996), a journalism student
- Daughter – Veronica (born 10 August 2001)
