= Krasnoyarsk Railway =

Railway in Russia

Krasnoyarsk Railway Красноярская железная дорога
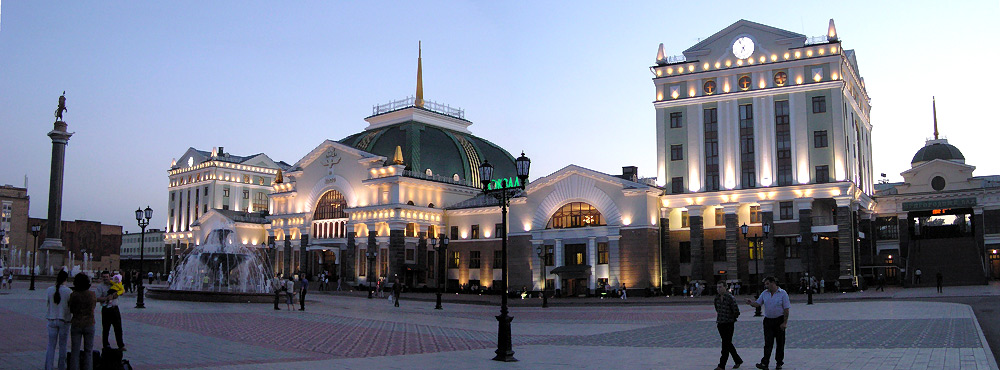
- Krasnoyarsk Railway station – the biggest on the railway.

Overview
- Headquarters: Krasnoyarsk
- Locale: Siberia, Russian Federation
- Dates of operation: 1979–Present
- Predecessor: Siberian railway

Technical
- Track gauge: 1,520 mm (4 ft 11 27/32 in)

Krasnoyarsk Railway (Russian: Красноярская железная дорога) is a subsidiary of the Russian Railways headquartered in Krasnoyarsk and serving the south of Siberia.

== Main information ==
Its mainline is a link in the Trans-Siberian Railway crossing the Krasnoyarsk Krai and Khakassia. It is located between the West Siberian Railway and East Siberian Railway. Its length is estimated at 3,157.9 km (1,962.2 mi) (as of 2009).

== History ==
Regular traffic on the road between Novonikolaevsk (now Novosibirsk) and Krasnoyarsk opened in 1898, between Krasnoyarsk and Irkutsk in 1899 after the completion of the construction of the largest railway bridge in Asia over the Yenisei.

In the period from January 1904 to October 1905 Siberian railway played a big role in providing military transportation during the Russo-Japanese War. In 1926 built the line Achinsk – Abakan (Achinsk-Minusinsk railway). In 1949 began the construction of the line Novokuznetsk – Abakan, in 1950, began construction of the station Abaza. In the 1960s to build Achinsk – Lesosibirsk, Red Hill – Kiya-Salter, Kamusta – Sayano-Shushenskaya power station. In 1965, completed the construction of the line Abakan – Taishet branch Uyar – Sayan. In the 1970s the line was built resota – Karabula.

Krasnoyarsk railway was first formed on 28 February 1936 on the basis of the decision of Council of people's Commissars of the USSR No. 378 of 27 February 1936 G. 9 May 1961, the road was abolished on the basis of the Decree of the USSR Council of Ministers No. 406 dated 6 May 1961 G. In the period 1961–1979, the road was part of the East Siberian Railway.

17 January 1979 road re-allocated from the East Siberian Railway on the basis of the Decree of the USSR Council of Ministers No. 1091 of 28 December 1978 G. 1 October 2003 Krasnoyarsk railway became a part of Russian Railways on the territorial rights of the branch. Krasnoyarsk Railway in 2008 carried 4,099 million passengers in long-distance communication and 12,378 million in the suburban. In 2008 dear transported 68,2 million tons of various cargoes. Basic nomenclature of the goods transported include coal, timber, ore, building materials and bulk cargoes. Today the Krasnoyarsk railway of Russian Railways is 97 structural units: 176 stations, 17 of the track, 6 track machine stations, 10 of signalling and communication, 18 container yards and other production units. 7 December 2004 — the 70th anniversary since the formation of Krasnoyarsk Krai was put into operation a new railway station of the regional center. The decision to build a new station of Krasnoyarsk was adopted in 2003 due to a significant increase in passenger traffic in Krasnoyarsk. The construction of the station and the railway station spent about half a billion rubles. Today Krasnoyarsk train station is considered one of the most beautiful and comfortable in the territory of the Urals. The new building has 16 ticket offices, is 6 more than before. Increased area of the station. Improved service passengers. 4 June 2005, opened a new station square station Krasnoyarsk. The cost of reconstruction of the station square amounted to 170 million rubles. It has increased by a total of fifteen hundred meters (7 to 9 and a half). The unique size makes sculptural composition – the figure of a lion mounted on a 16-meter-high stele. Lion with the sickle and the shovel – the heraldic symbol of Krasnoyarsk. By the way, Krasnoyarsk station square is the only one in the country, decorated with heraldic symbols.

According to the Development strategy of Russia in 2010, construction began on the railway in Tuva from Krasnoyarsk to Kyzyl. After completion it is expected to pass this road under the management of the Krasnoyarsk railway.

The number of employees on the road to 31 thousand people.
