= Siberian State Transport University =

- Сибирский государственный университет путей сообщения
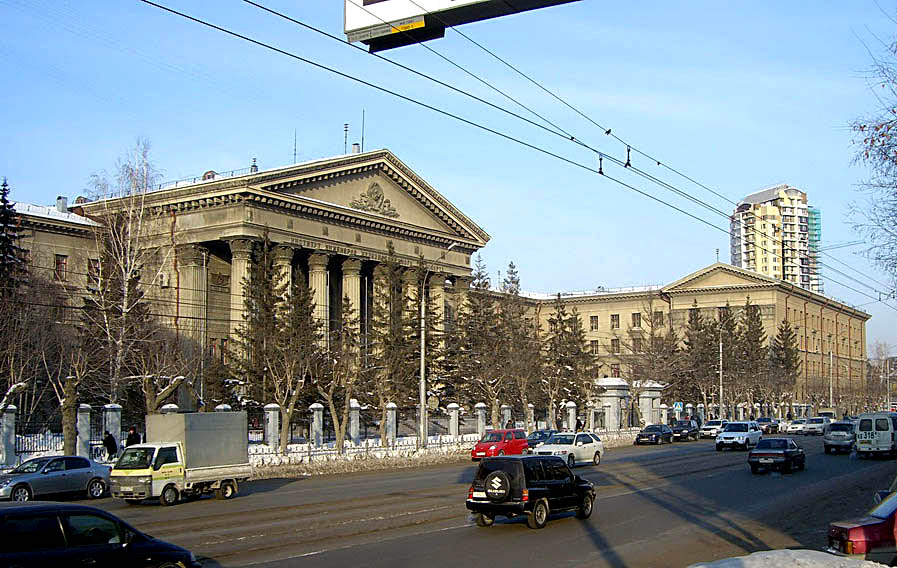
- Former names: Novosibirsk Institute of Military Transport Engineers (Nivit), Novosibirsk Institute of Railway Engineers (NIIZHT), Siberian State Academy of Railway Transport (SGAPS)
- Motto: «Твоя дорога в жизнь»
- Motto in English: Your Road to Life
- Type: State University
- Established: 1932
- Rector: Manakov Aleksey Leonidovich
- Students: 11,000
- Location: Novosibirsk, Russia; 55.0656°N 82.9264°E
- Campus: Urban
- Website: stu.ru

Siberian State Transport University (Russian: Сибирский государственный университет путей сообщения (СГУПС)) is a state university located in Novosibirsk, Russia. It was founded in 1932.

== History ==
It was established in 1932 on the basis of the Railway Engineering Faculty of the Siberian Institute of Transport Engineers, located in Tomsk. In 1932–1936, he was led by Sergey Propastin.

In 1934, it was transformed into the Novosibirsk Institute of Military Transport Engineers (NIVIT).

From 1932 to 1941, NIVIT was located in buildings now located on the territory of the Novosibirsk Instrument-Making Plant. In 1941, these buildings were occupied by an evacuated factory, and training from 1941 to 1955 took place in the house at Sovetskaya 20 (now Sovetskaya 18).

The main building of the institute was built in 1949–1955 at 191 Dusi Kovalchuk Street, designed by Moscow architect Vitaliy Maslennikov.

More than a thousand students and teachers took part in the Great Patriotic War, of which more than 60 people died in battle. The title of Hero of the Soviet Union was awarded to V. N. Bezukladnikov, Yu. I. Deryabin and E. I. Sterin. Many engineers from the first issue became major military leaders.

In 1953, NIVIT was transformed into the Novosibirsk Institute of Railway Engineers (NIIZHT). In 1956, the correspondence faculty was established on the basis of the correspondence department of NIIZHTA. In 1957, the Faculty of Industrial and Civil Engineering was opened, in 1962 — the Faculty of Engineering and Economics.

In 1993, the institute was awarded the status of an academy (Siberian State Academy of Railways — SSAPS), in 1997 — a university (Siberian State University of Railways — SSUPS). In 1995, the Faculty of World Economics and Law was opened, in 2002 — the Faculty of Personnel Management, in 2004 — the Faculty of Business Informatics. The university includes the Institute of Advanced Transport Technologies and Personnel Retraining. The Institute of Integrated Research of Transport Systems operates on the basis of the university.

Over the years of its existence, the university has trained more than 45,000 specialists.

== Faculties ==
- Railway construction
- Management of transport and technological complexes
- Bridges and tunnels
- Management of transportation processes in railway transport
- Industrial and civil engineering
- Faculty of Engineering and Economics
- World economy and law
- Public management and social communications
- Faculty of Business Informatics
- Correspondence Faculty

== Directions and specialties ==
- Cars and car service
- Highways and airfields
- Car service
- Crisis management
- Accounting, analysis and audit
- Water supply and sanitation
- State and municipal administration
- Information systems and technologies
- Logistics and supply chain management
- Mainline transport
- International and public law
- Management of the organization
- Global economy
- Bridges
- Ground transportation and technological complexes
- Organization of work with young people
- Lifting and transport, construction, road facilities and equipment
- Applied Computer Science
- Production management
- Industrial and civil engineering
- Psychology
- Advertising and public relations
- Standardization and metrology
- Standardization and certification
- Service
- Service of transport and technological machines and equipment
- Construction
- Construction of mainline railways
- Construction of unique buildings and structures
- Customs business
- Technosphere safety
- Tunnels and subways
- Tourism
- Criminal law
- Personnel management
- Finance and credit
- Private law
- Economics and management at the enterprise (railway transport)
- Real estate expertise and management
- Operation of railways.
- Operation of transport and technological machines and complexes (Master's degree)
- Law
