= Mikhail Mishustin's Second Cabinet =

Government of Russia (2024–present)

Second Cabinet of Mikhail Mishustin
- 57th Cabinet of Russia
- 10 May 2024 – present
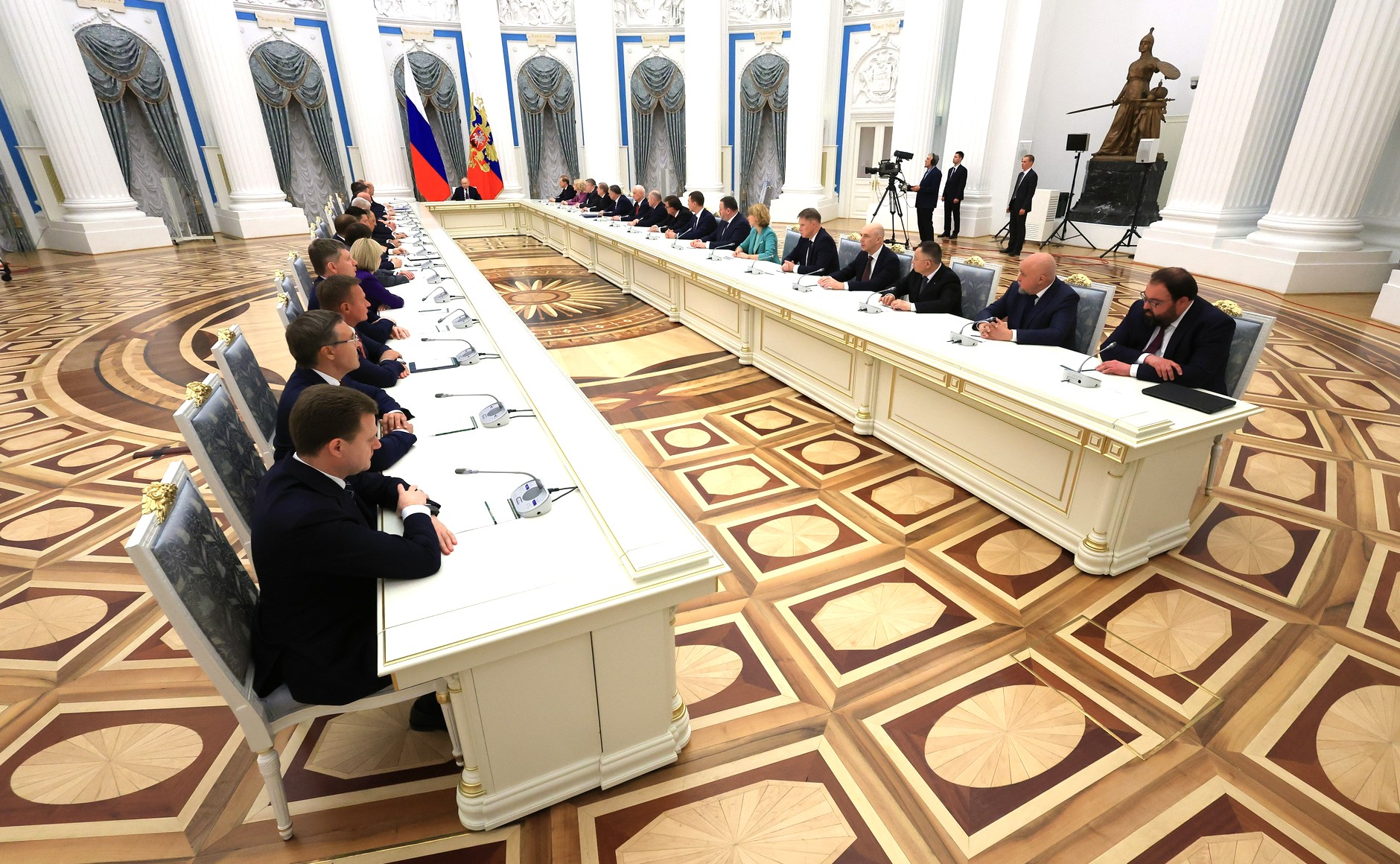
- President Vladimir Putin meets with the cabinet on 14 May 2024
- Date formed: 10 May 2024

People and organisations
- President: Vladimir Putin
- Prime minister: Mikhail Mishustin
- Deputy Prime minister: 11 (include 1 First Deputy)
- No. of ministers: 21
- Ministers removed: 4 resigned
- Total no. of members: 31
- Member party: United Russia Liberal Democratic party Independent
- Status in legislature: Coalition with support from A Just Russia and New People
- Opposition parties: Communist party
- Opposition leaders: Gennady Zyuganov

History
- Legislature terms: 8th State Duma (2024-2026); 9th State Duma (2026-present)
- Budget: 2024, 2025, 2026
- Predecessor: Mishustin I

The Mikhail Mishustin's Second Cabinet (Russian: Второе правительство Мишустина) is the current federal government of Russia, formed in May 2024, led by Prime Minister Mikhail Mishustin.

It is the first government of Russia of which the entire composition was approved by the State Duma and the Federation Council after the 2020 constitutional reform.

The first coalition Cabinet since 2004, in addition to representatives of United Russia, it also included a representative of the Liberal Democratic Party.

As with the previous cabinet, this entire cabinet is fully sanctioned by a number of countries and organizations such as the United States, the European Union, France, Ukraine, Japan, Australia, Taiwan, the United Kingdom, Canada, New Zealand and Germany because of the Russo-Ukrainian war.

== Formation ==
The government began to form after the resignation of the First Mishustin cabinet on 7 May 2024, as a result of Vladimir Putin's accession to a new presidential term.

On 10 May 2024, Chairman of the State Duma Vyacheslav Volodin announced that Vladimir Putin had proposed Mishustin's candidacy for the post of Prime Minister. The confirmation hearing for Mishustin took place on the same day.

Even before Mishustin's nomination, the deputy head of the United Russia faction, Yevgeny Revenko, said that the faction would support any candidate for the post of Prime Minister proposed by Putin. Since United Russia has a majority of seats in the State Duma, this means that Mishustin would become Prime Minister, even if all other parties voted against it. After Mishustin's consultations with the parliamentary factions, the leaders of the Liberal Democratic Party, A Just Russia – For Truth and New People also expressed support for Mishustin.

The Communist Party leader Gennady Zyuganov, after meeting with Mishustin, said that his faction would abstain from voting. According to Zyuganov, the communists have prepared proposals for the work of the future government, and the party will be ready to support Mishustin only if he confirms his readiness to implement them.

In accordance with the current version of the Constitution, the State Duma, in addition to the Prime Minister, will have to approve all deputy Prime ministers and most federal ministers. Their candidacies must be nominated by the Prime Minister after his appointment and approval of the Cabinet structure. At the same time, the Ministers of Defense, Foreign Affairs, Internal Affairs, Justice and Emergency Situations are nominated and appointed by the President after consultations with the Federation Council.

=== State Duma confirmation ===
==== Prime minister ====
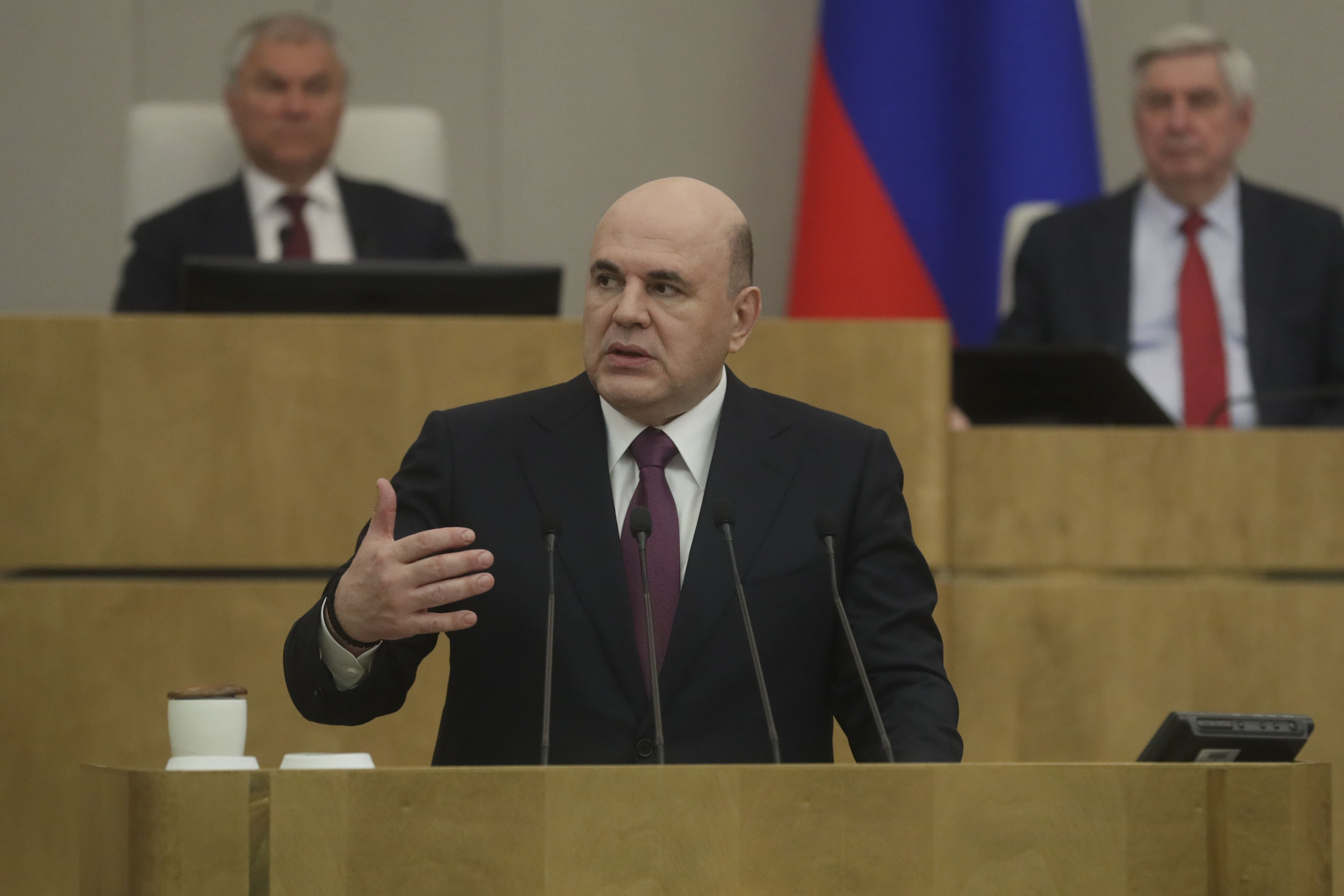
Mishustin at his confirmation hearing on 10 May 2024

Mikhail Mishustin was confirmed as Prime Minister on 10 May 2024.

Prime Minister of Russia
Nominee	Faction	Members	Yes	No	Abstained	Did not vote	Vacant
Mikhail Mishustin	United Russia	324	310	0	0	14	0
Mikhail Mishustin	Communist Party	57	0	0	57	0	0
Mikhail Mishustin	A Just Russia — For Truth	27	26	0	0	1	1
Mikhail Mishustin	Liberal Democratic Party	22	22	0	0	0	1
Mikhail Mishustin	New People	15	15	0	0	0	0
Mikhail Mishustin	Unaffiliated	2	2	0	0	0	0
Mikhail Mishustin	All factions	447	375	0	57	15	3
Mikhail Mishustin	Source						

==== Deputy Prime Ministers ====
State Duma held hearings on candidates for the positions of Deputy Prime Ministers and confirmed them on 13 May 2024.

Deputy Prime Ministers of Russia
Nominee	Faction	Members	Yes	No	Abstained	Did not vote	Vacant
Denis Manturov for First Deputy Prime Minister	United Russia	324	312	0	0	12	
Denis Manturov for First Deputy Prime Minister	Communist Party	57	53	0	0	4	
Denis Manturov for First Deputy Prime Minister	A Just Russia — For Truth	27	27	0	0	0	1
Denis Manturov for First Deputy Prime Minister	Liberal Democratic Party	22	22	0	0	0	1
Denis Manturov for First Deputy Prime Minister	New People	15	15	0	0	0	
Denis Manturov for First Deputy Prime Minister	Unaffiliated	2	2	0	0	0	
Denis Manturov for First Deputy Prime Minister	All factions	447	431	0	0	16	3
Denis Manturov for First Deputy Prime Minister	Source						
Dmitry Grigorenko for Deputy Prime Minister — Chief of Staff of the Government	United Russia	324	312	0	0	12	
Dmitry Grigorenko for Deputy Prime Minister — Chief of Staff of the Government	Communist Party	57	0	1	55	1	
Dmitry Grigorenko for Deputy Prime Minister — Chief of Staff of the Government	A Just Russia — For Truth	27	27	0	0	0	1
Dmitry Grigorenko for Deputy Prime Minister — Chief of Staff of the Government	Liberal Democratic Party	22	22	0	0	0	1
Dmitry Grigorenko for Deputy Prime Minister — Chief of Staff of the Government	New People	15	15	0	0	0	
Dmitry Grigorenko for Deputy Prime Minister — Chief of Staff of the Government	Unaffiliated	2	2	0	0	0	
Dmitry Grigorenko for Deputy Prime Minister — Chief of Staff of the Government	All factions	447	378	1	55	13	3
Dmitry Grigorenko for Deputy Prime Minister — Chief of Staff of the Government	Source						
Yury Trutnev for Deputy Prime Minister — Presidential Envoy to the Far Eastern Federal District	United Russia	324	312	0	0	12	
Yury Trutnev for Deputy Prime Minister — Presidential Envoy to the Far Eastern Federal District	Communist Party	57	0	0	57	0	
Yury Trutnev for Deputy Prime Minister — Presidential Envoy to the Far Eastern Federal District	A Just Russia — For Truth	27	26	0	0	1	1
Yury Trutnev for Deputy Prime Minister — Presidential Envoy to the Far Eastern Federal District	Liberal Democratic Party	22	22	0	0	0	1
Yury Trutnev for Deputy Prime Minister — Presidential Envoy to the Far Eastern Federal District	New People	15	15	0	0	0	
Yury Trutnev for Deputy Prime Minister — Presidential Envoy to the Far Eastern Federal District	Unaffiliated	2	1	0	1	0	
Yury Trutnev for Deputy Prime Minister — Presidential Envoy to the Far Eastern Federal District	All factions	447	376	0	58	16	3
Yury Trutnev for Deputy Prime Minister — Presidential Envoy to the Far Eastern Federal District	Source						
Dmitry Patrushev for Deputy Prime Minister	United Russia	324	311	0	0	13	
Dmitry Patrushev for Deputy Prime Minister	Communist Party	57	56	0	0	1	
Dmitry Patrushev for Deputy Prime Minister	A Just Russia — For Truth	27	27	0	0	0	1
Dmitry Patrushev for Deputy Prime Minister	Liberal Democratic Party	22	22	0	0	0	1
Dmitry Patrushev for Deputy Prime Minister	New People	15	15	0	0	0	
Dmitry Patrushev for Deputy Prime Minister	Unaffiliated	2	2	0	0	0	
Dmitry Patrushev for Deputy Prime Minister	All factions	447	433	0	0	17	3
Dmitry Patrushev for Deputy Prime Minister	Source						
Marat Khusnullin for Deputy Prime Minister	United Russia	324	312	0	0	12	
Marat Khusnullin for Deputy Prime Minister	Communist Party	57	0	0	57	0	
Marat Khusnullin for Deputy Prime Minister	A Just Russia — For Truth	27	24	0	3	0	1
Marat Khusnullin for Deputy Prime Minister	Liberal Democratic Party	22	21	0	1	0	1
Marat Khusnullin for Deputy Prime Minister	New People	15	15	0	0	0	
Marat Khusnullin for Deputy Prime Minister	Unaffiliated	2	2	0	0	0	
Marat Khusnullin for Deputy Prime Minister	All factions	447	374	0	61	15	3
Marat Khusnullin for Deputy Prime Minister	Source						
Alexey Overchuk for Deputy Prime Minister	United Russia	324	312	0	0	12	
Alexey Overchuk for Deputy Prime Minister	Communist Party	57	0	0	57	0	
Alexey Overchuk for Deputy Prime Minister	A Just Russia — For Truth	27	27	0	0	0	1
Alexey Overchuk for Deputy Prime Minister	Liberal Democratic Party	22	22	0	0	0	1
Alexey Overchuk for Deputy Prime Minister	New People	15	15	0	0	0	
Alexey Overchuk for Deputy Prime Minister	Unaffiliated	2	2	0	0	0	
Alexey Overchuk for Deputy Prime Minister	All factions	447	378	0	57	15	3
Alexey Overchuk for Deputy Prime Minister	Source						
Alexander Novak for Deputy Prime Minister	United Russia	324	312	0	0	12	
Alexander Novak for Deputy Prime Minister	Communist Party	57	0	0	57	0	
Alexander Novak for Deputy Prime Minister	A Just Russia — For Truth	27	27	0	0	0	1
Alexander Novak for Deputy Prime Minister	Liberal Democratic Party	22	22	0	0	0	1
Alexander Novak for Deputy Prime Minister	New People	15	15	0	0	0	
Alexander Novak for Deputy Prime Minister	Unaffiliated	2	2	0	0	0	
Alexander Novak for Deputy Prime Minister	All factions	447	378	0	57	15	3
Alexander Novak for Deputy Prime Minister	Source						
Tatyana Golikova for Deputy Prime Minister	United Russia	324	308	0	0	16	
Tatyana Golikova for Deputy Prime Minister	Communist Party	57	1	1	53	2	
Tatyana Golikova for Deputy Prime Minister	A Just Russia — For Truth	27	14	0	13	0	1
Tatyana Golikova for Deputy Prime Minister	Liberal Democratic Party	22	22	0	0	0	1
Tatyana Golikova for Deputy Prime Minister	New People	15	15	0	0	0	
Tatyana Golikova for Deputy Prime Minister	Unaffiliated	2	2	0	0	0	
Tatyana Golikova for Deputy Prime Minister	All factions	447	362	1	66	21	3
Tatyana Golikova for Deputy Prime Minister	Source						
Dmitry Chernyshenko for Deputy Prime Minister	United Russia	324	311	0	0	13	
Dmitry Chernyshenko for Deputy Prime Minister	Communist Party	57	55	0	0	2	
Dmitry Chernyshenko for Deputy Prime Minister	A Just Russia — For Truth	27	27	0	0	0	1
Dmitry Chernyshenko for Deputy Prime Minister	Liberal Democratic Party	22	22	0	0	0	1
Dmitry Chernyshenko for Deputy Prime Minister	New People	15	15	0	0	0	
Dmitry Chernyshenko for Deputy Prime Minister	Unaffiliated	2	2	0	0	0	
Dmitry Chernyshenko for Deputy Prime Minister	All factions	447	432	0	0	18	3
Dmitry Chernyshenko for Deputy Prime Minister	Source						
Vitaly Savelyev for Deputy Prime Minister	United Russia	324	312	0	0	12	
Vitaly Savelyev for Deputy Prime Minister	Communist Party	57	2	0	55	0	
Vitaly Savelyev for Deputy Prime Minister	A Just Russia — For Truth	27	27	0	0	0	1
Vitaly Savelyev for Deputy Prime Minister	Liberal Democratic Party	22	21	0	1	0	1
Vitaly Savelyev for Deputy Prime Minister	New People	15	15	0	0	0	
Vitaly Savelyev for Deputy Prime Minister	Unaffiliated	2	1	0	1	0	
Vitaly Savelyev for Deputy Prime Minister	All factions	447	378	0	57	15	3
Vitaly Savelyev for Deputy Prime Minister	Source						

==== Federal Ministers ====
State Duma held hearings for the positions of Federal Ministers and confirmed them on 14 May 2024.

Federal Ministers of Russia
Nominee	Faction	Members	Yes	No	Abstained	Did not vote	Vacant
Oksana Lut for Minister of Agriculture	United Russia	324	310	0	0	14	
Oksana Lut for Minister of Agriculture	Communist Party	57	54	0	0	3	
Oksana Lut for Minister of Agriculture	A Just Russia — For Truth	27	27	0	0	0	1
Oksana Lut for Minister of Agriculture	Liberal Democratic Party	22	22	0	0	0	1
Oksana Lut for Minister of Agriculture	New People	15	15	0	0	0	
Oksana Lut for Minister of Agriculture	Unaffiliated	2	1	0	0	1	
Oksana Lut for Minister of Agriculture	All factions	447	429	0	0	18	3
Oksana Lut for Minister of Agriculture	Source						
Irek Faizullin for Minister for Construction and Housing	United Russia	324	312	0	0	12	
Irek Faizullin for Minister for Construction and Housing	Communist Party	57	0	0	56	1	
Irek Faizullin for Minister for Construction and Housing	A Just Russia — For Truth	27	4	0	23	0	1
Irek Faizullin for Minister for Construction and Housing	Liberal Democratic Party	22	21	0	1	0	1
Irek Faizullin for Minister for Construction and Housing	New People	15	15	0	0	0	
Irek Faizullin for Minister for Construction and Housing	Unaffiliated	2	1	0	0	1	
Irek Faizullin for Minister for Construction and Housing	All factions	447	353	0	80	13	3
Irek Faizullin for Minister for Construction and Housing	Source						
Olga Lyubimova for Minister of Culture	United Russia	324	312	0	0	12	
Olga Lyubimova for Minister of Culture	Communist Party	57	0	54	1	2	
Olga Lyubimova for Minister of Culture	A Just Russia — For Truth	27	9	5	12	1	1
Olga Lyubimova for Minister of Culture	Liberal Democratic Party	22	21	1	0	0	1
Olga Lyubimova for Minister of Culture	New People	15	15	0	0	0	
Olga Lyubimova for Minister of Culture	Unaffiliated	2	0	1	0	1	
Olga Lyubimova for Minister of Culture	All factions	447	357	61	13	16	3
Olga Lyubimova for Minister of Culture	Source						
Aleksey Chekunkov for Minister for Development of the Russian Far East and Arctic	United Russia	324	310	0	0	14	
Aleksey Chekunkov for Minister for Development of the Russian Far East and Arctic	Communist Party	57	54	0	0	3	
Aleksey Chekunkov for Minister for Development of the Russian Far East and Arctic	A Just Russia — For Truth	27	27	0	0	0	1
Aleksey Chekunkov for Minister for Development of the Russian Far East and Arctic	Liberal Democratic Party	22	22	0	0	0	1
Aleksey Chekunkov for Minister for Development of the Russian Far East and Arctic	New People	15	15	0	0	0	
Aleksey Chekunkov for Minister for Development of the Russian Far East and Arctic	Unaffiliated	2	0	0	1	1	
Aleksey Chekunkov for Minister for Development of the Russian Far East and Arctic	All factions	447	428	0	1	21	3
Aleksey Chekunkov for Minister for Development of the Russian Far East and Arctic	Source						
Maxut Shadayev for Minister of Digital Development, Communications and Mass Media	United Russia	324	312	0	0	12	
Maxut Shadayev for Minister of Digital Development, Communications and Mass Media	Communist Party	57	0	0	54	3	
Maxut Shadayev for Minister of Digital Development, Communications and Mass Media	A Just Russia — For Truth	27	23	1	3	1	1
Maxut Shadayev for Minister of Digital Development, Communications and Mass Media	Liberal Democratic Party	22	22	0	0	0	1
Maxut Shadayev for Minister of Digital Development, Communications and Mass Media	New People	15	15	0	0	0	
Maxut Shadayev for Minister of Digital Development, Communications and Mass Media	Unaffiliated	2	1	0	0	1	
Maxut Shadayev for Minister of Digital Development, Communications and Mass Media	All factions	447	373	1	57	19	3
Maxut Shadayev for Minister of Digital Development, Communications and Mass Media	Source						
Maxim Reshetnikov for Minister of Economic Development	United Russia	324	311	0	0	13	
Maxim Reshetnikov for Minister of Economic Development	Communist Party	57	0	55	0	2	
Maxim Reshetnikov for Minister of Economic Development	A Just Russia — For Truth	27	1	26	0	0	1
Maxim Reshetnikov for Minister of Economic Development	Liberal Democratic Party	22	21	0	1	0	1
Maxim Reshetnikov for Minister of Economic Development	New People	15	15	0	0	0	
Maxim Reshetnikov for Minister of Economic Development	Unaffiliated	2	0	1	0	1	
Maxim Reshetnikov for Minister of Economic Development	All factions	447	348	82	1	16	3
Maxim Reshetnikov for Minister of Economic Development	Source						
Sergey Kravtsov for Minister of Education	United Russia	324	308	1	0	16	
Sergey Kravtsov for Minister of Education	Communist Party	57	0	5	48	4	
Sergey Kravtsov for Minister of Education	A Just Russia — For Truth	27	3	2	22	0	1
Sergey Kravtsov for Minister of Education	Liberal Democratic Party	22	20	1	0	1	1
Sergey Kravtsov for Minister of Education	New People	15	15	0	0	0	
Sergey Kravtsov for Minister of Education	Unaffiliated	2	0	0	1	1	
Sergey Kravtsov for Minister of Education	All factions	447	345	9	71	22	3
Sergey Kravtsov for Minister of Education	Source						
Sergey Tsivilyov for Minister of Energy	United Russia	324	312	0	0	12	
Sergey Tsivilyov for Minister of Energy	Communist Party	57	0	0	56	1	
Sergey Tsivilyov for Minister of Energy	A Just Russia — For Truth	27	27	0	0	0	1
Sergey Tsivilyov for Minister of Energy	Liberal Democratic Party	22	21	0	0	1	1
Sergey Tsivilyov for Minister of Energy	New People	15	15	0	0	0	
Sergey Tsivilyov for Minister of Energy	Unaffiliated	2	0	0	1	1	
Sergey Tsivilyov for Minister of Energy	All factions	447	375	0	57	15	3
Sergey Tsivilyov for Minister of Energy	Source						
Anton Siluanov for Minister of Finance	United Russia	324	312	0	0	12	
Anton Siluanov for Minister of Finance	Communist Party	57	0	56	0	1	
Anton Siluanov for Minister of Finance	A Just Russia — For Truth	27	1	26	0	0	1
Anton Siluanov for Minister of Finance	Liberal Democratic Party	22	20	1	0	1	1
Anton Siluanov for Minister of Finance	New People	15	15	0	0	0	
Anton Siluanov for Minister of Finance	Unaffiliated	2	0	1	0	1	
Anton Siluanov for Minister of Finance	All factions	447	348	84	0	15	3
Anton Siluanov for Minister of Finance	Source						
Mikhail Murashko for Minister of Health	United Russia	324	311	0	0	13	
Mikhail Murashko for Minister of Health	Communist Party	57	0	3	53	1	
Mikhail Murashko for Minister of Health	A Just Russia — For Truth	27	25	0	1	1	1
Mikhail Murashko for Minister of Health	Liberal Democratic Party	22	22	0	0	0	1
Mikhail Murashko for Minister of Health	New People	15	15	0	0	0	
Mikhail Murashko for Minister of Health	Unaffiliated	2	1	0	0	1	
Mikhail Murashko for Minister of Health	All factions	447	374	3	54	16	3
Mikhail Murashko for Minister of Health	Source						
Anton Alikhanov for Minister of Industry and Trade	United Russia	324	312	0	0	12	
Anton Alikhanov for Minister of Industry and Trade	Communist Party	57	54	0	0	3	
Anton Alikhanov for Minister of Industry and Trade	A Just Russia — For Truth	27	27	0	0	0	1
Anton Alikhanov for Minister of Industry and Trade	Liberal Democratic Party	22	22	0	0	0	1
Anton Alikhanov for Minister of Industry and Trade	New People	15	15	0	0	0	
Anton Alikhanov for Minister of Industry and Trade	Unaffiliated	2	0	0	0	2	
Anton Alikhanov for Minister of Industry and Trade	All factions	447	430	0	0	17	3
Anton Alikhanov for Minister of Industry and Trade	Source						
Anton Kotyakov for Minister of Labour; Social Protection	United Russia	324	311	0	0	13	
Anton Kotyakov for Minister of Labour; Social Protection	Communist Party	57	0	0	54	3	
Anton Kotyakov for Minister of Labour; Social Protection	A Just Russia — For Truth	27	1	26	0	0	1
Anton Kotyakov for Minister of Labour; Social Protection	Liberal Democratic Party	22	21	0	1	0	1
Anton Kotyakov for Minister of Labour; Social Protection	New People	15	15	0	0	0	
Anton Kotyakov for Minister of Labour; Social Protection	Unaffiliated	2	0	1	0	1	
Anton Kotyakov for Minister of Labour; Social Protection	All factions	447	348	27	55	17	3
Anton Kotyakov for Minister of Labour; Social Protection	Source						
Alexander Kozlov for Minister of Natural Resources and Ecology	United Russia	324	311	0	0	13	
Alexander Kozlov for Minister of Natural Resources and Ecology	Communist Party	57	0	2	51	4	
Alexander Kozlov for Minister of Natural Resources and Ecology	A Just Russia — For Truth	27	2	25	0	0	1
Alexander Kozlov for Minister of Natural Resources and Ecology	Liberal Democratic Party	22	21	0	1	0	1
Alexander Kozlov for Minister of Natural Resources and Ecology	New People	15	15	0	0	0	
Alexander Kozlov for Minister of Natural Resources and Ecology	Unaffiliated	2	0	0	1	1	
Alexander Kozlov for Minister of Natural Resources and Ecology	All factions	447	349	27	53	18	3
Alexander Kozlov for Minister of Natural Resources and Ecology	Source						
Valery Falkov for Minister of Science and Higher Education	United Russia	324	310	0	0	14	
Valery Falkov for Minister of Science and Higher Education	Communist Party	57	1	2	51	3	
Valery Falkov for Minister of Science and Higher Education	A Just Russia — For Truth	27	24	0	2	1	1
Valery Falkov for Minister of Science and Higher Education	Liberal Democratic Party	22	22	0	0	0	1
Valery Falkov for Minister of Science and Higher Education	New People	15	15	0	0	0	
Valery Falkov for Minister of Science and Higher Education	Unaffiliated	2	1	0	0	1	
Valery Falkov for Minister of Science and Higher Education	All factions	447	373	2	53	20	3
Valery Falkov for Minister of Science and Higher Education	Source						
Mikhail Degtyarev for Minister of Sport	United Russia	324	310	0	0	14	
Mikhail Degtyarev for Minister of Sport	Communist Party	57	0	0	54	3	
Mikhail Degtyarev for Minister of Sport	A Just Russia — For Truth	27	2	0	25	0	1
Mikhail Degtyarev for Minister of Sport	Liberal Democratic Party	22	22	0	0	0	1
Mikhail Degtyarev for Minister of Sport	New People	15	15	0	0	0	
Mikhail Degtyarev for Minister of Sport	Unaffiliated	2	1			1	
Mikhail Degtyarev for Minister of Sport	All factions	447	350	0	79	20	3
Mikhail Degtyarev for Minister of Sport	Source						
Roman Starovoyt for Minister of Transport	United Russia	324	310	0	0	14	
Roman Starovoyt for Minister of Transport	Communist Party	57	54	0	0	3	
Roman Starovoyt for Minister of Transport	A Just Russia — For Truth	27	27	0	0	0	1
Roman Starovoyt for Minister of Transport	Liberal Democratic Party	22	22	0	0	0	1
Roman Starovoyt for Minister of Transport	New People	15	15	0	0	0	
Roman Starovoyt for Minister of Transport	Unaffiliated	2	1	0	0	1	
Roman Starovoyt for Minister of Transport	All factions	447	429	0	0	21	3
Roman Starovoyt for Minister of Transport	Source						

=== Federation Council consultations ===
On 14 May 2024, the Federation Council held hearings on the proposed candidates for the posts of Ministers of Defense, Foreign Affairs, Internal Affairs, Justice and Emergency Situations. Following the results of the hearings, the Federation Council adopted a resolution on consultations.

Federal Ministers of Russia by presidential quota
Nominee	All senators	Yes	No	Abstained	Did not vote	Vacant
All nominees for ministers	178	172	0	0	6	
All nominees for ministers	Source					

=== Structure and composition ===
During the hearings on Mishustin's confirmation, Liberal Democratic Party leader Leonid Slutsky proposed appointing Khabarovsk Governor Mikhail Degtyarev as Minister of Sports. In addition, Slutsky proposed appointing Ulyanovsk regional deputy Viktor Bout as the head of the agency responsible for aviation issues.

On 11 May 2024, President Vladimir Putin approved the structure of the Cabinet of Ministers. In general, the structure of the Government has remained the same. As in the previous cabinet, the new one will have one First Deputy Prime Minister and 9 Deputy Prime Ministers. Also, the positions of Federal Ministers remained unchanged. At the same time, the post of Minister of Industry and Trade was separated from the post of Deputy Prime Minister. On the same day, Mikhail Mishustin nominated candidates for the positions of Deputy Prime Ministers and Ministers.

On 12 May 2024, President Vladimir Putin nominated candidates for the positions of Ministers of Defense, Foreign Affairs, Internal Affairs, Justice and Emergency Situations. Of the five ministers, four retained their positions. At the same time, former First Deputy Prime Minister Andrey Belousov was nominated for the post of Defence Minister instead Sergey Shoygu, who was appointed new Secretary of the Security Council.

On 14 May 2024, President Vladimir Putin appointed the approved nominees for Deputy Prime Ministers and Federal Ministers.

On 17 May 2024, Mikhail Mishustin approved the distribution of duties between the Deputy Prime Ministers.

== Composition ==
Second Mishustin Cabinet
Post	Portrait	Incumbent	Political party	Took office	Left office
Prime Minister
Prime Minister		Mikhail Mishustin	Independent	10 May 2024	Incumbent
Deputy Prime Ministers
First Deputy Prime Minister for Technological Development and Industry		Denis Manturov	Independent	14 May 2024	Incumbent
Deputy Prime Minister; Chief of Staff of the Government		Dmitry Grigorenko	Independent	14 May 2024	22 October 2026
Deputy Prime Minister; Chief of Staff of the Government		Irina Okladnikova	Independent	22 October 2026	Incumbent
Deputy Prime Minister; Presidential Envoy to the Far Eastern Federal District		Yury Trutnev	United Russia	14 May 2024	22 October 2026
Deputy Prime Minister; Presidential Envoy to the Far Eastern Federal District		Oleg Kozhemyako	United Russia	22 October 2026	Incumbent
Deputy Prime Minister for Agro-Industrial Complex, Natural Resources and Ecology		Dmitry Patrushev	Independent	14 May 2024	Incumbent
Deputy Prime Minister for Construction and Regional Development		Marat Khusnullin	Independent	14 May 2024	Incumbent
Deputy Prime Minister for Eurasian Integration, cooperation with the CIS, BRICS, G20 and International Events		Alexey Overchuk	Independent	14 May 2024	Incumbent
Deputy Prime Minister for Economy and Fuel–Energy Complex		Alexander Novak	Independent	14 May 2024	Incumbent
Deputy Prime Minister for Social Policy		Tatyana Golikova	United Russia	14 May 2024	Incumbent
Deputy Prime Minister for Science, Youth Policy, Tourism, Sport and Communications		Dmitry Chernyshenko	Independent	14 May 2024	Incumbent
Deputy Prime Minister for Transport		Vitaly Savelyev	United Russia	14 May 2024	28 September 2026
Deputy Prime Minister for Transport		Andrey Nikitin	United Russia	22 October 2026	Incumbent
Deputy Prime Minister for Finance		Anton Siluanov	United Russia	22 October 2026	Incumbent
Minister of Finance		Anton Siluanov	United Russia	14 May 2024	Incumbent
Federal Ministers
Minister of Agriculture		Oksana Lut	Independent	14 May 2024	Incumbent
Minister for Construction and Housing		Irek Faizullin	Independent	14 May 2024	Incumbent
Minister of Culture		Olga Lyubimova	Independent	14 May 2024	Incumbent
Minister of Defence		Andrey Belousov	Independent	14 May 2024	Incumbent
Minister for Development of the Russian Far East and Arctic		Aleksey Chekunkov	Independent	14 May 2024	Incumbent
Minister of Digital Development, Communications and Mass Media		Maxut Shadayev	Independent	14 May 2024	Incumbent
Minister of Economic Development		Maxim Reshetnikov	United Russia	14 May 2024	Incumbent
Minister of Education		Sergey Kravtsov	Independent	14 May 2024	Incumbent
Minister of Emergency Situations		Aleksandr Kurenkov	Independent	14 May 2024	Incumbent
Minister of Energy		Sergey Tsivilyov	United Russia	14 May 2024	Incumbent
Minister of Foreign Affairs		Sergey Lavrov	Independent	14 May 2024	Incumbent
Minister of Health		Mikhail Murashko	Independent	14 May 2024	Incumbent
Minister of Industry and Trade		Anton Alikhanov	United Russia	14 May 2024	Incumbent
Minister of Internal Affairs		Vladimir Kolokoltsev	Independent	14 May 2024	Incumbent
Minister of Justice		Konstantin Chuychenko	Independent	14 May 2024	Incumbent
Minister of Labour and Social Protection		Anton Kotyakov	Independent	14 May 2024	Incumbent
Minister of Natural Resources and Ecology		Alexander Kozlov	United Russia	14 May 2024	Incumbent
Minister of Science and Higher Education		Valery Falkov	United Russia	14 May 2024	Incumbent
Minister of Sport		Mikhail Degtyarev	Liberal Democratic Party	14 May 2024	Incumbent
Minister of Transport		Roman Starovoyt	United Russia	14 May 2024	7 July 2025
Minister of Transport		Andrey Nikitin	United Russia	7 July 2025	8 July 2025
Minister of Transport		Andrey Nikitin	United Russia	8 July 2025	22 October 2026
Minister of Transport		Dmitry Yadrov	Independent	22 October 2026	Incumbent

== Reshuffles ==
Colour key
- Joined Cabinet
- Left Cabinet

=== July 2025 ===
On 7 July 2025, President Vladimir Putin dismissed Transport Minister Roman Starovoyt. The reasons for the minister's resignation were not given. On the same day, Starovoit was found dead, after a suspected suicide.

On 7 July 2025, Andrey Nikitin, who had previously held the position of Deputy Minister of Transport, was appointed Acting Minister of Transport. On the same day, Prime Minister Mikhail Mishustin nominated Nikitin for the post of Minister.

On 8 July 2025, the State Duma approved Andrey Nikitin as Minister of Transport. On the same day, he was appointed to this position by presidential decree.

Before reshuffle				After reshuffle				State Duma confirmation						
Officeholder	Party	Reason of left office	Date of left office	Nominee	Party	Previous office	Date of nomination	Faction	Members	Yes	No	Abstained	Did not vote	Vacant
Minister of Transport
Roman Starovoyt	United Russia	Resignation	7 July 2025	Andrey Nikitin	United Russia	Deputy Minister of Transport (2025)	7 July 2025	United Russia	316	296	0	0	20	
Roman Starovoyt	United Russia	Resignation	7 July 2025	Andrey Nikitin	United Russia	Deputy Minister of Transport (2025)	7 July 2025	Communist Party	57	55	0	0	2	
Roman Starovoyt	United Russia	Resignation	7 July 2025	Andrey Nikitin	United Russia	Deputy Minister of Transport (2025)	7 July 2025	A Just Russia – For Truth	28	23	0	0	5	
Roman Starovoyt	United Russia	Resignation	7 July 2025	Andrey Nikitin	United Russia	Deputy Minister of Transport (2025)	7 July 2025	Liberal Democratic Party	22	20	0	0	2	
Roman Starovoyt	United Russia	Resignation	7 July 2025	Andrey Nikitin	United Russia	Deputy Minister of Transport (2025)	7 July 2025	New People	15	13	0	0	2	
Roman Starovoyt	United Russia	Resignation	7 July 2025	Andrey Nikitin	United Russia	Deputy Minister of Transport (2025)	7 July 2025	Unaffiliated	3	2	0	0	1	
Roman Starovoyt	United Russia	Resignation	7 July 2025	Andrey Nikitin	United Russia	Deputy Minister of Transport (2025)	7 July 2025	All factions	441	408	0	0	42	9
Roman Starovoyt	United Russia	Resignation	7 July 2025	Andrey Nikitin	United Russia	Deputy Minister of Transport (2025)	7 July 2025	Source						

=== September–October 2026 ===
The reshuffling occurred as a result of 2026 legislative election, due to the election of some government members as deputies of the State Duma (under Russian law, government members cannot combine this work with work in parliament).

On 28 September, Deputy Prime Minister Vitaly Savelyev resigned his powers due to being elected as a member of the State Duma. On 19 October, new government reshuffles were announced, primarily affecting the positions of Deputy Prime Ministers. The State Duma hearings of nominees is scheduled for 21 October.

Before reshuffle				After reshuffle				State Duma confirmation						
Officeholder	Party	Reason of left office	Date of left office	Nominee	Party	Previous office	Date of nomination	Faction	Members	Yes	No	Abstained	Did not vote	Vacant
Deputy Prime Minister – Chief of Staff of the Government
Dmitry Grigorenko	Independent	Resignation	22 October 2026	Irina Okladnikova	Independent	First Deputy Minister of Finance (2024–2026)	19 October 2026	United Russia	350	336	0	0	14	
Dmitry Grigorenko	Independent	Resignation	22 October 2026	Irina Okladnikova	Independent	First Deputy Minister of Finance (2024–2026)	19 October 2026	Communist Party	37	37	0	0	0	
Dmitry Grigorenko	Independent	Resignation	22 October 2026	Irina Okladnikova	Independent	First Deputy Minister of Finance (2024–2026)	19 October 2026	Liberal Democratic Party	24	23	0	0	1	
Dmitry Grigorenko	Independent	Resignation	22 October 2026	Irina Okladnikova	Independent	First Deputy Minister of Finance (2024–2026)	19 October 2026	New People	20	18	0	0	2	
Dmitry Grigorenko	Independent	Resignation	22 October 2026	Irina Okladnikova	Independent	First Deputy Minister of Finance (2024–2026)	19 October 2026	A Just Russia	17	14	0	0	3	
Dmitry Grigorenko	Independent	Resignation	22 October 2026	Irina Okladnikova	Independent	First Deputy Minister of Finance (2024–2026)	19 October 2026	Unaffiliated	2	2	0	0	0	
Dmitry Grigorenko	Independent	Resignation	22 October 2026	Irina Okladnikova	Independent	First Deputy Minister of Finance (2024–2026)	19 October 2026	All factions	450	430	0	0	20	
Dmitry Grigorenko	Independent	Resignation	22 October 2026	Irina Okladnikova	Independent	First Deputy Minister of Finance (2024–2026)	19 October 2026	О проекте постановления Государственной Думы № 14329-9 "Об утверждении Окладниковой Ирины Андреевны Заместителем Председателя Правительства Российской Федерации – Руководителем Аппарата Правительства Российской Федерации"						
Deputy Prime Minister – Presidential Envoy to the Far Eastern Federal District
Yury Trutnev	United Russia	Resignation	22 October 2026	Oleg Kozhemyako	United Russia	Governor of Primorsky Krai (2018–2026)	19 October 2026	United Russia	350	336	0	0	14	
Yury Trutnev	United Russia	Resignation	22 October 2026	Oleg Kozhemyako	United Russia	Governor of Primorsky Krai (2018–2026)	19 October 2026	Communist Party	37	37	0	0	0	
Yury Trutnev	United Russia	Resignation	22 October 2026	Oleg Kozhemyako	United Russia	Governor of Primorsky Krai (2018–2026)	19 October 2026	Liberal Democratic Party	24	23	0	0	1	
Yury Trutnev	United Russia	Resignation	22 October 2026	Oleg Kozhemyako	United Russia	Governor of Primorsky Krai (2018–2026)	19 October 2026	New People	20	18	0	0	2	
Yury Trutnev	United Russia	Resignation	22 October 2026	Oleg Kozhemyako	United Russia	Governor of Primorsky Krai (2018–2026)	19 October 2026	A Just Russia	17	14	0	0	3	
Yury Trutnev	United Russia	Resignation	22 October 2026	Oleg Kozhemyako	United Russia	Governor of Primorsky Krai (2018–2026)	19 October 2026	Unaffiliated	2	2	0	0	0	
Yury Trutnev	United Russia	Resignation	22 October 2026	Oleg Kozhemyako	United Russia	Governor of Primorsky Krai (2018–2026)	19 October 2026	All factions	450	430	0	0	20	
Yury Trutnev	United Russia	Resignation	22 October 2026	Oleg Kozhemyako	United Russia	Governor of Primorsky Krai (2018–2026)	19 October 2026	О проекте постановления Государственной Думы № 14664-9 "Об утверждении Кожемяко Олега Николаевича Заместителем Председателя Правительства Российской Федерации – полномочным представителем Президента Российской Федерации в Дальневосточном федеральном округе"						
Deputy Prime Minister
Vitaly Savelyev	United Russia	Election to the State Duma	28 September 2026	Andrey Nikitin	United Russia	Minister of Transport (2025–2026)	19 October 2026	United Russia	350	336	0	0	14	
Vitaly Savelyev	United Russia	Election to the State Duma	28 September 2026	Andrey Nikitin	United Russia	Minister of Transport (2025–2026)	19 October 2026	Communist Party	37	37	0	0	0	
Vitaly Savelyev	United Russia	Election to the State Duma	28 September 2026	Andrey Nikitin	United Russia	Minister of Transport (2025–2026)	19 October 2026	Liberal Democratic Party	24	23	0	0	1	
Vitaly Savelyev	United Russia	Election to the State Duma	28 September 2026	Andrey Nikitin	United Russia	Minister of Transport (2025–2026)	19 October 2026	New People	20	18	0	0	2	
Office vacant			28 September 2026 – 22 October 2026	Andrey Nikitin	United Russia	Minister of Transport (2025–2026)	19 October 2026	A Just Russia	17	14	0	0	3	
Office vacant			28 September 2026 – 22 October 2026	Andrey Nikitin	United Russia	Minister of Transport (2025–2026)	19 October 2026	Unaffiliated	2	2	0	0	0	
Office vacant			28 September 2026 – 22 October 2026	Andrey Nikitin	United Russia	Minister of Transport (2025–2026)	19 October 2026	All factions	450	430	0	0	20	
Office vacant			28 September 2026 – 22 October 2026	Andrey Nikitin	United Russia	Minister of Transport (2025–2026)	19 October 2026	О проекте постановления Государственной Думы № 14596-9 "Об утверждении Никитина Андрея Сергеевича Заместителем Председателя Правительства Российской Федерации"						
Deputy Prime Minister
New office				Anton Siluanov	United Russia	Minister of Finance (2011–present)	19 October 2026	United Russia	350	336	0	0	14	
New office				Anton Siluanov	United Russia	Minister of Finance (2011–present)	19 October 2026	Communist Party	37	37	0	0	0	
New office				Anton Siluanov	United Russia	Minister of Finance (2011–present)	19 October 2026	Liberal Democratic Party	24	23	0	0	1	
New office				Anton Siluanov	United Russia	Minister of Finance (2011–present)	19 October 2026	New People	20	18	0	0	2	
New office				Anton Siluanov	United Russia	Minister of Finance (2011–present)	19 October 2026	A Just Russia	17	14	0	0	3	
New office				Anton Siluanov	United Russia	Minister of Finance (2011–present)	19 October 2026	Unaffiliated	2	2	0	0	0	
New office				Anton Siluanov	United Russia	Minister of Finance (2011–present)	19 October 2026	All factions	450	430	0	0	20	
New office				Anton Siluanov	United Russia	Minister of Finance (2011–present)	19 October 2026	О проекте постановления Государственной Думы № 14577-9 "Об утверждении Силуанова Антона Германовича Заместителем Председателя Правительства Российской Федерации – Министром финансов Российской Федерации"						
Minister of Transport
Andrey Nikitin	United Russia	Change of portfolio	22 October 2026	Dmitry Yadrov	Independent	Head of the Federal Air Transport Agency (2023–2026)	19 October 2026	United Russia	350	336	0	0	14	
Andrey Nikitin	United Russia	Change of portfolio	22 October 2026	Dmitry Yadrov	Independent	Head of the Federal Air Transport Agency (2023–2026)	19 October 2026	Communist Party	37	37	0	0	0	
Andrey Nikitin	United Russia	Change of portfolio	22 October 2026	Dmitry Yadrov	Independent	Head of the Federal Air Transport Agency (2023–2026)	19 October 2026	Liberal Democratic Party	24	23	0	0	1	
Andrey Nikitin	United Russia	Change of portfolio	22 October 2026	Dmitry Yadrov	Independent	Head of the Federal Air Transport Agency (2023–2026)	19 October 2026	New People	20	18	0	0	2	
Andrey Nikitin	United Russia	Change of portfolio	22 October 2026	Dmitry Yadrov	Independent	Head of the Federal Air Transport Agency (2023–2026)	19 October 2026	A Just Russia	17	14			3	0
Andrey Nikitin	United Russia	Change of portfolio	22 October 2026	Dmitry Yadrov	Independent	Head of the Federal Air Transport Agency (2023–2026)	19 October 2026	Unaffiliated	2	2	0	0	0	0
Andrey Nikitin	United Russia	Change of portfolio	22 October 2026	Dmitry Yadrov	Independent	Head of the Federal Air Transport Agency (2023–2026)	19 October 2026	All factions	450	430	0	0	20	0
Andrey Nikitin	United Russia	Change of portfolio	22 October 2026	Dmitry Yadrov	Independent	Head of the Federal Air Transport Agency (2023–2026)	19 October 2026	О проекте постановления Государственной Думы № 14590-9 "Об утверждении Ядрова Дмитрия Викторовича Министром транспорта Российской Федерации"						
