= Oksana Lut =

Russian politician and economist (born 1979)

- Оксана Лут
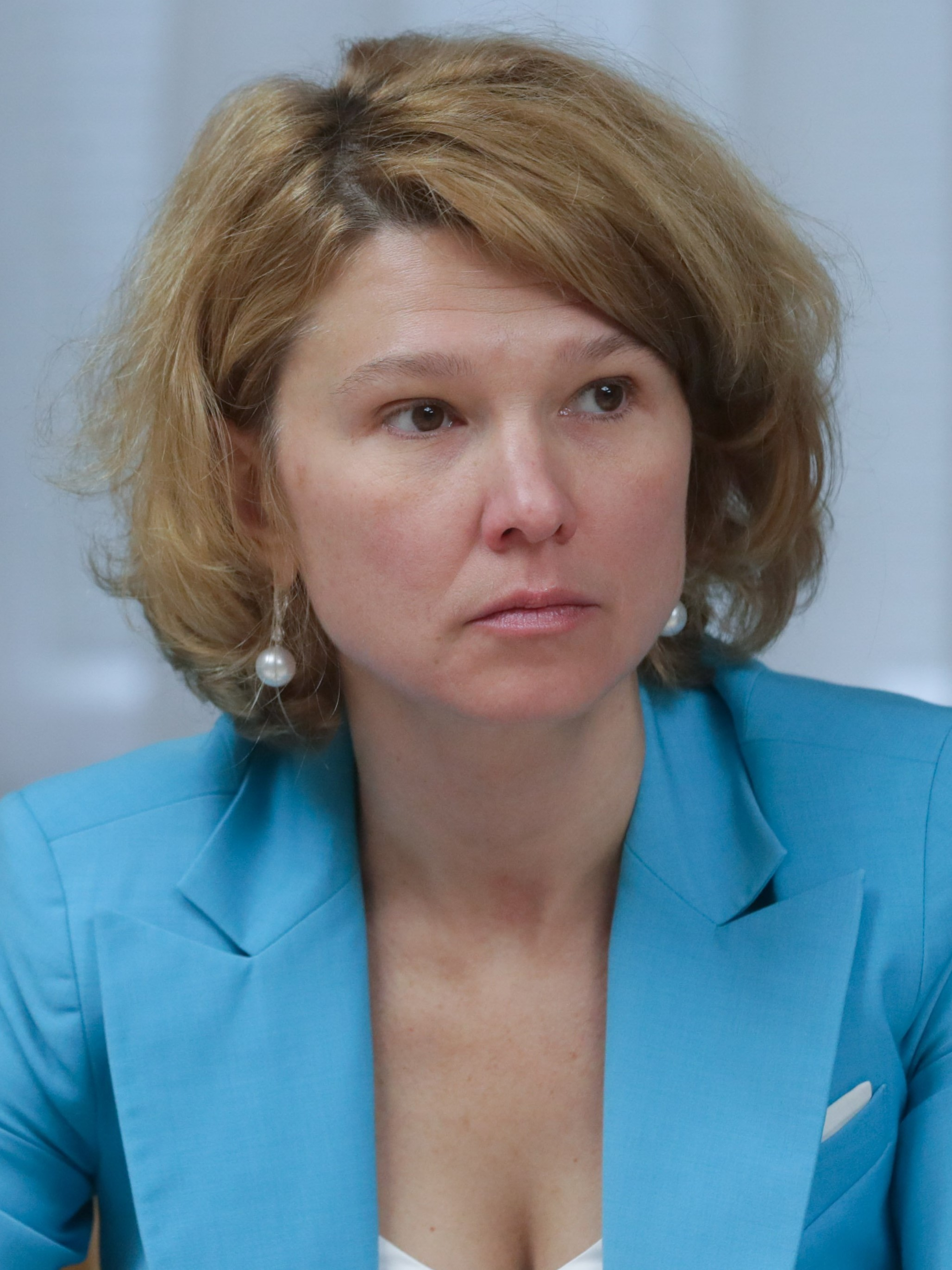
- Lut in 2024

Minister of Agriculture
- Incumbent
- Assumed office 14 May 2024
- President: Vladimir Putin
- Prime Minister: Mikhail Mishustin
- Preceded by: Dmitry Patrushev

First Deputy Minister of Agriculture
- In office 24 December 2021 – 14 May 2024
- President: Vladimir Putin
- Prime Minister: Mikhail Mishustin
- Preceded by: Dzhambulat Khatuov

Deputy Minister of Agriculture
- In office 12 July 2018 – 24 December 2021
- President: Vladimir Putin
- Prime Minister: Dmitry Medvedev; Mikhail Mishustin

Personal details
- Born: 25 February 1979 (age 47) Moscow, Russian SFSR, Soviet Union
- Education: Financial University under the Government of the Russian Federation
- Awards: Russian Federation Presidential Certificate of Honour (2015); Medal of the Order "For Merit to the Fatherland", II Class (2021)

Oksana Nikolaevna Lut (Russian: Окса́на Никола́евна Лут; born 25 February 1979) is a Russian economist and politician serving as the Minister of Agriculture since May 2024. She previously served as First Deputy Minister of Agriculture from 2021 and Deputy Minister of Agriculture from 2018 until 2021.

== Biography ==
Oksana Lut was born on 25 February 1979 in Moscow, Russian SFSR, Soviet Union.

In 2001, she graduated from the Financial Academy under the Government of the Russian Federation with a degree in finance and credit.

From 1999 to 2000, she held various positions in banking organizations.

From 2000 to 2003, she worked as an economist of the department of credit and promising products and a senior economist of the Regional Business Lending Department of ALFA-BANK.

From 2003 to 2010, she worked in various departments as Managing Director within the state-owned VTB Bank.

From January to October 2010, she served as Head of the Department of Investment Programs and Head of the Non-Core Assets Service of the Department of Investment Projects within the state-owned defense conglomerate Rostec.

From October 2010 to July 2018, she served as Director of the Department for Client Services Department; Director of the Corporate Business Development Department; Director of the Large Business Department, and Deputy Chairman of the Board of the state agriculture bank, RusAg.

From July 2018 to December 2021, she served as Deputy Minister of Agriculture.

From December 2021 to 14 May 2024, she served as First Deputy Minister of Agriculture.

On 14 May 2024, she was appointed Minister of Agriculture within the new government. In her candidacy speech before the State Duma she announced the Ministry's new project “Technological support for food security,” which she believes will allow Russia to achieve higher production within the agro-industrial complex.

In 2015, she was given the Russian Federation Presidential Certificate of Honour by President Vladimir Putin.

In 2021, she was awarded the Medal of the order For Merit to the Fatherland, II Class.

== Sanctions ==
Due to the Russo–Ukrainian War, Lut was sanctioned by Ukraine on 9 November 2025 for "appropriated agricultural property, grain crops, and cultural heritage sites, conducted information operations against [the] state, and introduced Russian educational standards with anti-Ukrainian narratives in the occupied territories of Ukraine."
