= Boris Listov =

Russian politician (born 1969)

- Борис Листов

Chairman of the Board of Russian Agricultural Bank
- Incumbent
- Assumed office 14 June 2018
- Preceded by: Dmitry Patrushev

Senator from the Jewish Autonomous Oblast
- In office 27 March 2007 – 30 October 2009
- Preceded by: Stanislav Vavilov
- Succeeded by: Vladimir Dzhabarov

Personal details
- Born: Boris Listov; 11 March 1969 (age 57) Vsevolozhsk, Leningrad Oblast, Russian SFSR Soviet Union
- Education: Saint Petersburg State University of Economics

Boris Pavlovich Listov (Russian: Борис Павлович Листов; born 11 March 1969) is a Russian economist, Chairman of the Board of Russian Agricultural Bank. He was a member of the Federation Council Federal Assembly of the Russian Federation from the Legislative Assembly of the Jewish Autonomous Region from 2007 to 2009.

== Biography ==
Boris Pavlovich Listov was born on 11 March 1969 in the city of Vsevolozhsk, Leningrad Oblast.

In 1995, he graduated from the St. Petersburg University of Economics and Finance with a degree in "Accounting and Audit".

In 2006, he defended his candidate's dissertation and received the academic degree of Candidate of Economic Sciences. In 2011, he graduated from the Moscow State Law Academy named after O.E. Kutafin with a degree in "Jurisprudence".

In March 2007, Listov was elected a member of the Federation Council of the Federal Assembly of the Russian Federation and represented the legislative (representative) body of state power of the Jewish Autonomous Region.

From March 2007 to October 2009, he was a member of the Federation Council's Committee on Financial Markets and Monetary Circulation and the Committee on Local Self-Government Issues.

In 2008, he joined the Federation Council's Commission on Youth Affairs and Sports (from 12.11.2008 the name of the Commission was changed: "Commission of the Federation Council on Youth Affairs and Tourism"), on Physical Culture, Sports and the Development of the Olympic Movement.

On 30 October 2009 he took up the position of First Deputy Chairman of the Board of Rosselkhozbank and joined the Board of the credit organization, in connection with which he resigned as senator.

Since June 2018, he has been the Chairman of the Board, a member of the Supervisory Board of JSC "Rosselkhozbank".
