= Mikhail Mishustin's Cabinet =

Mikhail Mishustin's Cabinet may refer to:

- Mikhail Mishustin's First Cabinet, the Russian government led by Mikhail Mishustin from 2020 to 2024
- Mikhail Mishustin's Second Cabinet, the Russian government led by Mikhail Mishustin since 2024
