= Irina Okladnikova =

Russian government official and economist

- Ирина Окладникова
- Official portrait, 2026

Deputy Prime Minister of Russia Chief of Staff for the Government of Russia
- Incumbent
- Assumed office 22 October 2026
- Prime Minister: Mikhail Mishustin
- Preceded by: Dmitry Grigorenko

Personal details
- Born: 3 November 1984 (age 41) Nizhnevartovsk, Russian SFSR, Soviet Union
- Party: Independent
- Education: Krasnoyarsk State University; RANEPA
- Profession: Politician, economist

Irina Andreyevna Okladnikova (Russian: Ирина Андреевна Окладникова; born November 3, 1984, in Krasnoyarsk) is a Russian government official and economist. Deputy Prime Minister and Chief of Staff for the Government of Russia Minister since 22 October 2026. From 2020 to 2024, she served as a Deputy Minister of Finance, and from 2024 to 2026, as the First Deputy Minister of Finance. She holds the rank of 1st class Active State Councillor of the Russian Federation.

== Biography ==
Irina Andreyevna Okladnikova was born on November 3, 1984, in Krasnoyarsk. In 2006, she graduated from Krasnoyarsk State University (now part of the Siberian Federal University) with a degree in World Economy. Between 2005 and 2012—starting while she was still a student—she worked at the Ministry of Natural Resources and the Forestry Complex of the Krasnoyarsk Krai. In 2012, she moved to the federal Ministry of Finance, where Mikhail Kotyukov was also working at the time. Within the Ministry, she rose through the ranks from a staff member to First Deputy Minister. In 2014, she graduated from the Russian Presidential Academy of National Economy and Public Administration (RANEPA) with a degree in Law.

As First Deputy Minister of Finance, Irina Okladnikova oversaw the implementation of the "Electronic Budget" system and the integration of artificial intelligence into the budgetary process.

On October 19, 2026, she was for the position of Deputy Prime Minister and Chief of the Government Staff amidst a reshuffule at the Second Cabinet of Mikhail Mishustin, succeeding Dmitry Grigorenko.
