= Navalny 35 =

Sanctions list of human right abusers

Navalny 35 (also known as the Navalny's List) are a group of Russian human rights abusers, kleptocrats, and corruptioners involved in poisoning and imprisonment of Russian opposition leader Alexei Navalny. The initial list, compiled by Navalny's team, contained 35 individuals.

== Background ==
On February 8, 2021, Vladimir Ashurkov, executive director of Navalny's Anti-Corruption Foundation, recommended the European Union to sanction 35 Russian individuals linked to poisoning and imprisonment of Alexei Navalny.

Earlier, on October 15, 2020, the European Union had imposed sanctions "for the use of chemical weapons for an attempted assassination of Alexei Navalny" on six high-ranking Russian officials and Russian state research institute GosNIIOKhT, which developed chemical weapon agent Novichok. These sanctions include "a travel ban to the EU and asset freezing of individuals and legal entities. In addition, the EU individuals and legal entities are prohibited from providing funds to sanctioned individuals and entities". The UK followed suit on the same day, October 15, 2020.

On March 2, 2021, the European Union imposed sanctions on Russia's chief law enforcement officers in connection with the poisoning of Alexei Navalny. Later that day, the United States imposed sanctions on seven Russian individuals and three organizations in relation to Navalny poisoning and imprisonment.

On March 24, 2021, Canada imposed sanctions on nine Russians on the same grounds.

On August 20, 2021, the UK imposed sanctions on seven FSB officers whom it considers involved in the poisoning. The United States imposed sanctions on nine FSB officers and two organizations. The United States also announced the forthcoming sanctions against Russia for the use of chemical weapons for Navalny poisoning. Sanctions are planned to include additional restrictions on exportation of goods and technologies related to nuclear and missile manufacturing, as well as restrictions on the import of certain types of Russian firearms and ammunition.

On September 22, 2021, the Rules Committee of the United States House of Representatives approved for consideration the US National Defence bill amendment by Representative Tom Malinowski aimed to sanction 35 individuals from the Navalny's list. In the bill they called 'Russian kleptocrats and human rights abusers'.

On October 7, 2021, Helsinki Commission Chairman Senator Ben Cardin and Ranking Member Senator Roger Wicker introduced a bill to the Congress proposing to impose sanctions against individuals on the Navalny 35 list adding them to Global Magnitsky sanctions.

== Navalny's List ==
#	Name	Occupation	Reason for inclusion	Date of imposition of sanctions
1	Roman Abramovich	Billionaire businessman and oligarch; net worth $12.9 billion (2019)	One of prime beneficiaries of the kleptocracy system developed and maintained by the Kremlin and Putin. Abramovich has large assets in Western countries and holds permanent residency and/or citizenship in some of them.	GB March 10, 2022; Canada March 10, 2022; Australia March 14, 2022; EU March 15, 2022; Switzerland March 16, 2022; New Zealand April 5, 2022; Ukraine October 19, 2022
2	Denis Bortnikov	Deputy President and board member of Vneshtorgbank (VTB), Russia's state-owned bank	Son of Alexander Bortnikov, director of the Federal Security Service (FSB). Acts as a 'wallet' for his father's shadow income from corruption.	US February 22, 2022; EU February 23, 2022; GB February 24, 2022; Canada February 24, 2022; Switzerland February 25, 2022; Australia February 26, 2022; Japan March 3, 2022 New Zealand March 18, 2022; Ukraine October 19, 2022
3	Andrey Kostin	President and Chairman of VTB bank Board	VTB bank is known to launder the money of top Russian officials.	US April 6, 2018; Canada March 15, 2019; Ukraine June 24, 2021; EU February 23, 2022; Switzerland February 25, 2022; Japan 3 March 2022; GB March 10, 2022; New Zealand March 18, 2022; Australia April 6, 2022
4	Mikhail Murashko	Minister of Health of the Russian Federation	Responsible for a cover up of Alexei Navalny's poisoning and attempts to halt his emergency medical evacuation to Germany.	Canada March 6, 2022; Ukraine June 9, 2022; Australia February 24, 2023; New Zealand February 24, 2023
5	Dmitry Patrushev	Minister of Agriculture of the Russian Federation	Son of Nikolai Patrushev, head of Russia's Security Council and former FSB director. Acts as a 'wallet' for his father's shadow income from corruption.	Canada March 6, 2022; GB March 15, 2022; Ukraine June 9, 2022; Australia July 1, 2022; New Zealand October 12, 2022
6	Igor Shuvalov	Former First Deputy Prime Minister of the Russian Federation. Chairman of the State Development Corporation VEB.RF (ex-Vnesheconombank)	Oligarch, owns assets acquired on corrupt money in many Western countries.	EU February 23, 2022; Canada February 24, 2022; US March 3, 2022; GB March 4, 2022; Australia March 14, 2022; New Zealand March 18, 2022
7	Vladimir Solovyov	Journalist, TV and radio host on state-controlled channels	One of the prime state propaganda spreaders including a cover up, lies, and fake news about repressions against Alexei Navalny and the Russian opposition.	EU February 23, 2022; Canada March 6, 2022; GB March 15, 2022
8	Alisher Usmanov	Billionaire businessman and oligarch; net worth $17.9 billion (2021)	One of the key participants and beneficiaries of the kleptocracy system developed and maintained by the Kremlin and Putin. Usmanov has large assets and significant business ties in Western countries.	EU February 28, 2022; US March 3, 2022; GB March 4, 2022; Canada March 10, 2022
9	Alexander Bastrykin	Head of the Investigative Committee of Russia	Fabrication of criminal cases against journalists, activists and opposition representatives	US January 9, 2017; EU March 2, 2021; Canada November 3, 2017
10	Alexander Bortnikov	Director of the Federal Security Service (FSB) of the Russian Federation	Responsible for the attempted poisoning of Alexei Navalny. Came under sanctions as involved in the imprisonment of Alexei Navalny.	EU October 15, 2020; GB October 15, 2020; US March 2, 2021; Canada March 23, 2021EU February 23, 2022; New Zealand March 18, 2022
11	Konstantin Ernst	CEO of the state-owned Channel One Russia TV station	Producer of the prime state propaganda source covering illegal repressive measures against the opposition and inciting social hostility.	Canada March 6, 2022; EU March 15, 2022; GB March 15, 2022
12	Victor Gavrilov	Head of the Transport department of the FSB Economic Security service	Responsible for the arrest of Navalny after arriving in Moscow on January 17, 2021. Coordinatied various agencies during the arrival of Navalny's flight, resulting in unplanned change of the airport of the flight arrival.	Canada March 6, 2022
13	Dmitry Ivanov	Head of Chelyabinsk FSB, former Head of Tomsk FSB	As a head of Tomsk FSB he organized the support and help to an FSB team during the attempted poisoning of Alexey Navalny in Tomsk. After the poisoning he was promoted to the head of the FSB of the larger Chelyabinsk region.	Canada March 6, 2022
14	Alexander Kalashnikov	Director of the Federal Penitentiary Service (FSIN) of the Russian Federation	Organization of the illegal arrest of Alexei Navalny upon his return to Moscow and the systematic violation of human rights in penitentiary places. Came under sanctions as involved in the poisoning of Alexei Navalny	EU March 2, 2021; US March 2, 2021; Canada March 23, 2021
15	Sergey Kiriyenko	First Deputy Chief of Staff of the Presidential Administration of the Russian Federation	Involved in the non-admission of independent candidates to the elections and attempts to obstruct the 'Smart Voting'. Came under sanctions for involvement in the poisoning and imprisonment of Alexei Navalny.	EU October 15, 2020; GB October 15, 2020; US March 2, 2021; Canada March 23, 2021; New Zealand March 18, 2022
16	Elena Morozova	Judge of the Khimki District Court	Authorized the illegal arrest of Navalny for 30 days after arriving in Russia on January 17, 2021, which consequently led to his further imprisonment	Canada March 10, 2022
17	Denis Popov	Chief Prosecutor of Moscow	Chief Prosecutor's office spearheaded a repressive campaign against Navalny's team through investigations and courts.	
18	Margarita Simonyan	Editor-in-Chief of Russian State media network RT (former Russia Today)	Simonyan sets the informational direction of the main abroad state propaganda source, which positions itself as the main weapon of information warfare against the entire Western world. She has boasted that RT is capable of "conducting an information war against the whole Western world"	EU February 23, 2022; Canada March 6, 2022; GB March 15, 2022; New Zealand March 18, 2022
19	Igor Yanchuk	Head of the Khimki Police Department	Responsible for Alexey Navalny's arrest on his return to Russia and arranging his illegal trial in a local police station, which contributed to the further illegal imprisonment of Alexei Navalny	Canada March 10, 2022
20	Viktor Zolotov	Director of the National Guard of Russia	He is responsible for the violent suppression of opposition activities on the streets. One of Putin's most personally loyal supporters. Challenged Navalny to a duel and threatened to "make minced meat out of him". Came under sanctions and as involved in the poisoning and imprisonment of Alexei Navalny.	US April 6, 2018; EU March 2, 2021; GB March 15, 2022; New Zealand March 18, 2022; Canada March 23, 2021
21	Oleg Deripaska	Billionaire businessman and oligarch; net worth $4.1 billion (2021)	One of prime beneficiaries of the kleptocracy system developed and maintained by the Kremlin and Putin. Deripaska has large assets and significant business ties in Western countries.	US April 6, 2018; GB March 10, 2022; Canada March 6, 2022; Australia March 18, 2022
22	Alexey Miller	Chairman of the Gazprom Board, Russia's state-owned multinational energy corporation	One of prime beneficiaries of the kleptocracy system developed and maintained by the Kremlin and Putin, and a significant instrument of covert Russia's influence abroad.	US April 6, 2018; GB March 10, 2022; Canada March 4, 2022; Australia March 14, 2022
23	Igor Sechin	Chairman of the Rosneft Board, Russia's state-owned multinational energy corporation	Close and long-term ally and "de facto deputy" of Vladimir Putin. He is an oligarch and one of prime beneficiaries of the kleptocracy system developed and maintained by the Kremlin and Putin, and also the driving force behind policies such as support for the Nicolás Maduro regime in Venezuela.	US April 28, 2014; Canada March 15, 2019; EU February 28, 2022; GB March 10, 2022; New Zealand March 18, 2022
24	Gennady Timchenko	Billionaire businessman and oligarch; net worth $19.5 billion (2021)	Close and long-term ally of Vladimir Putin, one of prime beneficiaries of the kleptocracy system developed and maintained by the Kremlin and Putin. Timchenko is a reportedly 'wallet' of Putin, he has large assets and significant business ties in Western countries.	Canada March 21, 2014; US December 22, 2015; GB February 22, 2022EU February 28, 2022; New Zealand March 18, 2022
25	Nikolay Tokarev	Chairman of Transneft, Russia's state-controlled pipeline transport company	One of prime beneficiaries of the kleptocracy system developed and maintained by the Kremlin and Putin. Participated in the construction of Putin's palace in Gelendzhik.	Canada February 24, 2022; EU February 28, 2022; US March 3, 2022; GB March 10, 2022; Australia March 14, 2022
26	Alexander Beglov	Governor of Saint Petersburg	One of Putin's closest allies, whose corrupt activities were highlighted by a Navalny investigation, who supported measures to suppress freedom of assembly and protest.	Canada February 28, 2022; GB March 15, 2022
27	Yury Chaika	Presidential Envoy of the North Caucasian Federal District, former Prosecutor General of the Russian Federation	As a Prosecutor General of Russia until 2020 Chaika contributed to the repression of civilians.	Canada February 28, 2022; GB March 15, 2022; New Zealand March 18, 2022
28	Andrey Kartapolov	Deputy of the State Duma, former Deputy Defence Minister of the Russian Federation and Chief of Main Directorate for Political-Military Affairs	Reportedly involved in the downing of Malaysian airliner MH17 in 2014. Responsible for using conscription as a mean of persecuting opposition activists.	GB February 16, 2015; Canada February 24, 2022; EU March 10, 2022
29	Pavel Krasheninnikov	Deputy of the State Duma, former Minister of Justice of the Russian Federation	Krasheninnikov personally drafted or supported numerous recent authoritarian laws, including a recent proposal that would impede a prosecution of former presidents on corruption charges.	EU February 25, 2022; Canada March 6, 2022; GB March 11, 2022
30	Mikhail Mishustin	Prime Minister of Russia	The main executor of Putin's regime policies.	EU February 25, 2022; Canada February 28, 2022; GB March 15, 2022; New Zealand March 18, 2022
31	Ella Pamfilova	Chairman of the Central Election Commission of Russia	Aided and participated in falsification and subsequent legitimization of elections in Russia including presidential elections and referendums.	Canada March 10, 2022
32	Dmitry Peskov	Presidential Press Secretary, the primary spokesman for the Russian government, Deputy Chief of Staff of the Presidential Administration of Russia	Concealing any information about illegal operations against Alexei Navalny and malicious actions of the Putin regime in the country or abroad.	EU February 28, 2022; Canada March 6, 2022; US March 11, 2022; GB March 15, 2022; New Zealand March 18, 2022
33	Sergey Sobyanin	Mayor of Moscow	Organization of electoral fraud and the promotion of criminal activity through corrupt municipal projects, the primary executor of Putin's regime policies in the capital.	Canada February 28, 2022; GB March 15, 2022
34	Anton Vaino	Chief of Staff of the Presidential Executive Office of the Russian Federation	Coordination and implementation of the Putin's regime policies in Russia and abroad.	EU February 23, 2022; Canada February 28, 2022; GB March 15, 2022; New Zealand March 18, 2022
35	Andrey Vorobyov	Governor of the Moscow Region	Corrupt activities investigated and revealed by Navalny and his team.	

In addition to the list presented by Alexei Navalny's associates, the sanctions were earlier imposed on the following persons involved in the poisoning:

#	Name	Occupation	Reason for inclusion	Date of imposition of sanctions
36	Andrey Yarin	Head of the Domestic Policy Office of the President of the Russian Federation	Involvement in the poisoning and imprisonment of Alexei Navalny	EU October 15, 2020; GB October 15, 2020; US March 2, 2021; Canada March 23, 2021
37	Alexey Krivoruchko	Deputy Minister of Defense of the Russian Federation	Involvement in the poisoning and imprisonment of Alexei Navalny	EU October 15, 2020; GB October 15, 2020; US March 2, 2021; Canada March 23, 2021; New Zealand March 18, 2022
38	Pavel Popov	Deputy Minister of Defense of the Russian Federation	Involvement in the poisoning and imprisonment of Alexei Navalny	EU October 15, 2020; GB October 15, 2020; US March 2, 2021; Canada March 23, 2021; New Zealand March 18, 2022
39	Sergey Menyaylo	Head of North Ossetia-Alania, former Presidential Envoy in the Siberian Federal District	Involvement in the poisoning and imprisonment of Alexei Navalny	EU October 15, 2020; GB October 15, 2020; Canada March 23, 2021
40	Igor Krasnov	Prosecutor General of the Russian Federation	Involvement in the poisoning and imprisonment of Alexei Navalny	EU March 2, 2021; US March 2, 2021; GB March 15, 2022; Canada March 23, 2021
41	Kirill Vasiliev	Director of the FSB Criminalistics Institute	Involvement in the poisoning of Alexei Navalny	GB August 20, 2021; US August 20, 2021
42	Alexey Sedov	Head of the FSB Second Service (Service for the protection of the constitutional order and the fight against terrorism)	Involvement in the poisoning of Alexei Navalny	GB August 20, 2021; US August 20, 2021
43	Alexey Alexandrov (Alexey Frolov)	FSB criminalist officer	Involvement in the poisoning of Alexei Navalny	GB August 20, 2021
44	Vladimir Panyaev	FSB officer	Involvement in the poisoning of Alexei Navalny	GB August 20, 2021; US August 20, 2021
45	Ivan Osipov (Ivan Spiridonov)	FSB criminalist officer	Involvement in the poisoning of Alexei Navalny	GB August 20, 2021
46	Vladimir Bogdanov	Director of the FSB Center of Special Technology, former Director of the FSB Criminalistics Institute	Involvement in the poisoning of Alexei Navalny	GB August 20, 2021; US August 20, 2021
47	Stanislav Makshakov	Deputy Director of the FSB Criminalistics Institute	Involvement in the poisoning of Alexei Navalny	GB August 20, 2021; US August 20, 2021
48	Konstantin Kudryavtsev	Employee of the FSB Criminalistics Institute	Involvement in the poisoning of Alexei Navalny	US August 20, 2021
49	Arthur Zhirov	Former director of the 27th Science Center, a chemical weapons specialist	Involvement in the poisoning of Alexei Navalny	US August 20, 2021

And also on organizations:

#	Organization	Reason for inclusion	Date of imposition of sanctions
1	State Research Institute of Organic Chemistry and Technology (GosNIIOKhT)	Development of chemical weapons, including Novichok agent	EU October 15, 2020; GB October 15, 2020; US March 2, 2021
2	27th Research and Development Center of the Ministry of Defense (27th TsNII)	Use of military and dual-use information technologies	US March 2, 2021
3	33rd Central Research and Development Institute of the Ministry of Defense (33-й TsNII)	Production of Novichok agent, contrary to its designation as the main developer of all technologies for the destruction of toxic substances used at Russian chemical weapons destruction facilities	US March 2, 2021
4	FSB Criminalistics Institute	Involvement of employees in the operation of poisoning of Alexei Navalny	US August 20, 2021
5	State Research and Testing Institute of Military Medicine of the Ministry of Defense (GNII VM MO)	Cooperation with the 27th Research and development center and 33rd Central research and development institute	US August 20, 2021

== Russia's reaction ==
On February 12, 2021, Russian Foreign Minister Sergei Lavrov announced that Russia is ready to break its relations with the EU should it introduce new sanctions, saying 'if you want peace, prepare for war'.

On September 23, 2021, press secretary of Russian Foreign Ministry, Maria Zakharova, warned the United States against 'ill-considered move on the sanctions track' in relation to the Congress' plans on the introduction of new sanctions against Russian officials.

== See also ==
- Putin's Kleptocracy
- Russian Asset Tracker
