= Dmitry Patrushev =

Russian politician

- Дмитрий Патрушев
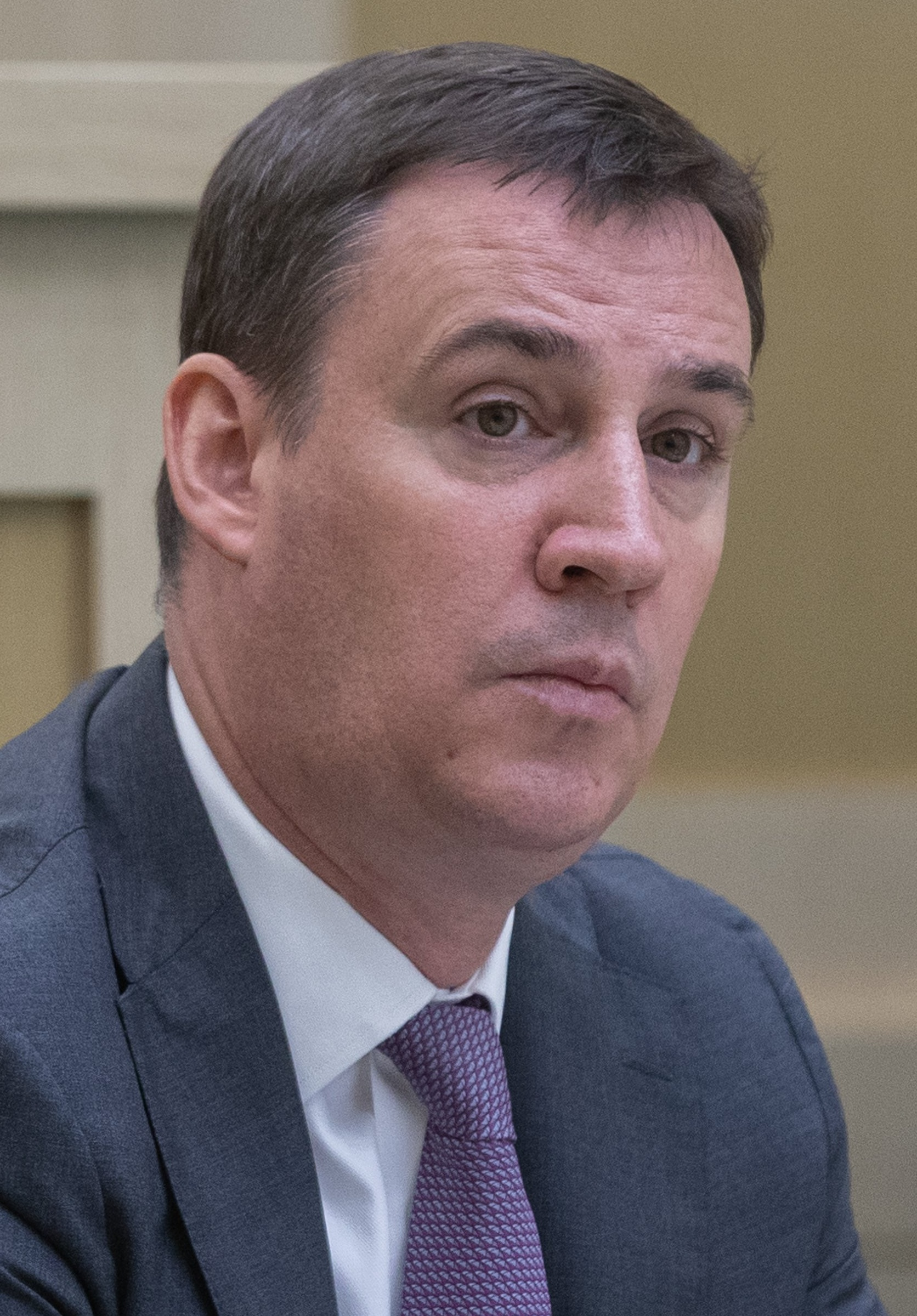
- Patrushev in 2019

Deputy Prime Minister of Russia for Agro-Industrial Complex, Natural Resources and Ecology
- Incumbent
- Assumed office 14 May 2024
- President: Vladimir Putin
- Prime Minister: Mikhail Mishustin
- Preceded by: Viktoria Abramchenko

Minister of Agriculture
- In office 18 May 2018 – 7 May 2024; Acting: 15 January 2020 – 21 January 2020; Acting: 7 May 2024 – 14 May 2024
- President: Vladimir Putin
- Prime Minister: Dmitry Medvedev; Mikhail Mishustin
- Preceded by: Alexander Tkachov
- Succeeded by: Oksana Lut

Personal details
- Born: 13 October 1977 (age 48) Leningrad, Russian SFSR, Soviet Union (now Saint Petersburg, Russia)
- Party: Independent
- Children: 6
- Parent(s): Nikolai Patrushev (father), Elena Nikolaevna Patrusheva (mother)
- Education: State University of Management; Diplomatic Academy; FSB Academy

Military service
- Rank: Lieutenant (FSB)

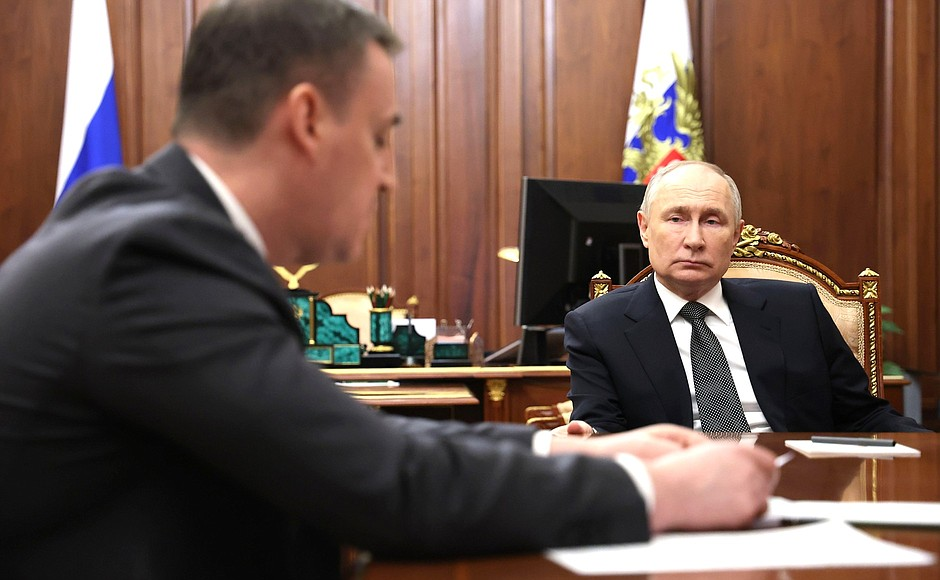
Patrushev meets with Vladimir Putin on 20 February 2024.

Dmitry Nikolayevich Patrushev (Russian: Дмитрий Николаевич Патрушев; born 13 October 1977) is a Russian banker and politician serving as the deputy prime minister for agriculture since May 2024. He previously served as Minister of Agriculture of Russia from 2018 to 2024.

Dmitry Patrushev is the son of Nikolai Patrushev, former director of FSB and secretary of the Russian Security Council. Nikolai Patrushev is a trusted member of Russian leader Vladimir Putin's inner circle. The two have known each other since the 1970s.

At the age of 32, Patrushev was made chairman of the fourth-largest bank in Russia, the Russian Agricultural Bank.

== Early life and education ==
Dmitry Patrushev was born in Leningrad on 13 October 1977.

In 1999, he graduated from the State University of Management with a degree in management. From 2002 to 2004, he studied at the Diplomatic Academy in the specialty "World Economy". In 2006, he graduated from the FSB Academy.

On 16 April 2003, Patrushev defended his PhD dissertation on organizational and economic foundations of quality management in research organizations at the Saint Petersburg State University of Economics and Finance under G. N. Ivanova's supervision. The official referents for the defense were B. V. Pryankov and P. M. Shavkunov.

On 3 July 2008, he defended his Doctor of Sciences (DSc) dissertation in Economics at the Saint Petersburg State University of Economics and Finance. The dissertation entitled "State and market regulators in the formation and implementation of industrial policy: The case of natural monopolies of the Fuel-Energy Complex" was defended under the supervision of V. V. Korelin; the official referents were V. V. Glukhov, A. V. Kruglov and S. A. Uvarov.

== Business career ==
From 1999 to 2002, he worked in the Ministry of Transport. In 2004, he joined VTB Bank.

Since 2007, he has held the position of senior vice president of VTB bank.

From 2010 to 2018, he was chairman of the board and member of the supervisory board of the Russian Agricultural Bank.

According to Vedomosti, with the arrival of Dmitry Patrushev at RSHB, 1,500 criminal cases were initiated, 68 of which were against bank employees, including 11 against department heads. The total damage from their actions was estimated at 23.5 billion rubles.

After the previous management-team left, Patrushev focused on recovering problematic loans. The issue was not fully resolved, but by 2018, their share had decreased to 18% compared to 27% at the beginning of 2013.

Under Patrushev control, RSHB became more transparent. His steps toward centralizing risk management, security, and internal control allowed the bank to prevent potential losses of approximately 100 billion rubles in 2013.

During Patrushev's chairmanship, the bank extended the variety of products and services offered to individuals and businesses. New insurance and investment business lines were established, and the bank increased its support for the agro-industrial complex. Moreover, from 2010 to 2017, Russian Agricultural Bank's loan portfolio quadrupled. In 2017, its amount was estimated to be 2.97 trillion rubles.

From 2016 to 2021, he was a member of the Gazprom board of directors. Since 2018, he has served as chairman of the supervisory board of Russian Agricultural Bank JSC.

== Political career ==
=== Minister of Agriculture ===
On 18 May 2018, he was appointed Minister of Agriculture. On 21 January 2020, he was re-appointed for this post in Mikhail Mishustin's Cabinet. Under the direction of Patrushev, the state program "Integrated Development of Rural Areas" was implemented, within its framework, agricultural mortgage was launched. By the end of 2020, it covered 82 regions of the Russian Federation and affected 6 million people.

In 2020, for the first time in its post-Soviet history, Russia became a net exporter of food. A total of 79 million tons of agricultural products and food were supplied abroad, amounting to $30.7 billion, while imports stood at $29.7 billion. By 2023, the export of food products and agricultural raw materials had reached $43.1 billion.

=== Deputy Prime Minister ===
On 14 May 2024, he was appointed Deputy Prime Minister of Russia in Mikhail Mishustin's Second Cabinet. In the government, he oversees agriculture, the agro-industrial complex, and environmental issues.

=== Sanctions ===
Following the publication of the Navalny 35 list of Russian human rights abusers and the 2022 Russian invasion of Ukraine, sanctions were imposed against Patrushev by Australia, Canada, Ukraine, New Zealand and the United Kingdom.

== Personal life ==
Dmitry Patrushev has never been formally married, and has six illegitimate children: three sons and three daughters.

His father, Nikolay Platonovich Patrushev, is a Russian statesman. He held the post of director of the Federal Security Service of Russia from 1999 to 2008. From 12 May 2008 until 12 May 2024, he was secretary of the Security Council of the Russian Federation. Since 14 May 2024 he has served as Aide to the President of Russia.

His mother, Elena Nikolaevna Patrusheva (born 1955), worked as a doctor of ultrasound diagnostics and was an employee of Vnesheconombank. In 1993, together with Boris Gryzlov and other classmates and coworkers of her husband, she became a founder of Borg LLP, which specialized in exporting scrap metal.

Patrushev has a brother, Andrey, known as the former deputy general director for offshore project development at Gazprom Neft and former general director of Gazprom Neft Shelf. As of 2021, Andrey Patrushev has been working as director general of the Arctic Initiatives Center.

== Awards ==
- Order of Honour (26 October 2016) - for contributing to the organization of credit support of the agro-industrial complex
- Medal "For Services to the Chechen Republic" (26 December 2017)
- Honored Worker of Agriculture of the Chechen Republic (15 April 2022)
- Certificate of Merit of the Ministry of Agriculture of the Russian Federation - for continuous and conscientious work in the agricultural sector
- Diploma of the Association of Russian Banks - for contributing to the development of the Russian banking system
- Industry Award "Banker of the Year" (2015)

Political offices
Preceded by Alexander Tkachov	Minister of Agriculture; 2018–2024	Succeeded by Oksana Lut
Preceded by Viktoria Abramchenko	Deputy Prime Minister for the Agro-Industrial Complex; 2024–present	Succeeded by Incumbent
