= Dmitry Grigorenko =

Russian politician

- Дмитрий Григоренко
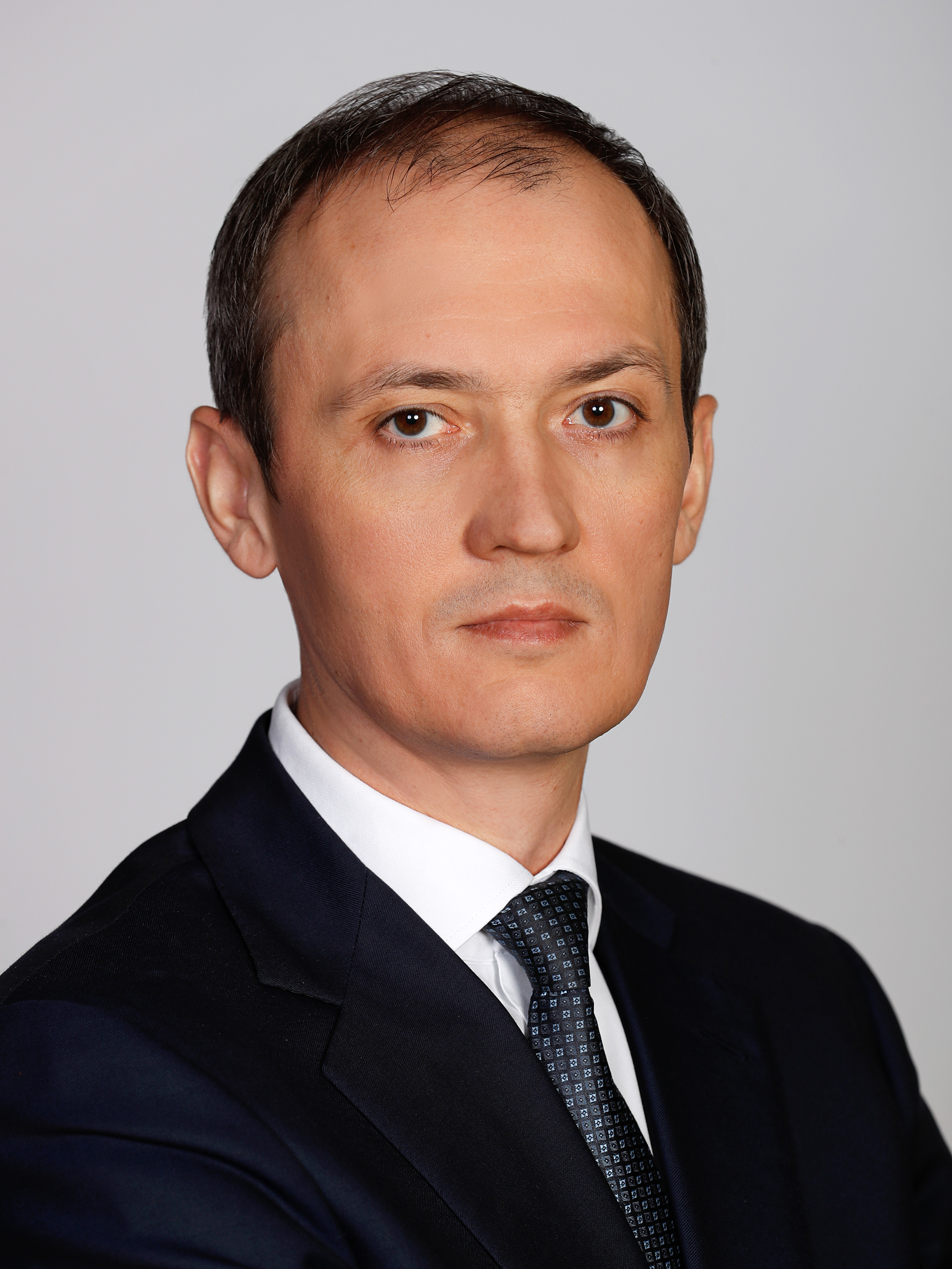
- Official portrait, 2020

Deputy Prime Minister of Russia Chief of Staff for the Government of Russia
- In office 21 January 2020 – 22 October 2026
- Prime Minister: Mikhail Mishustin
- Preceded by: Konstantin Chuychenko
- Succeeded by: Irina Okladnikova

Personal details
- Born: 14 July 1978 (age 48) Nizhnevartovsk, Russian SFSR, Soviet Union
- Party: Independent
- Education: Kuban State University
- Profession: Politician

Dmitry Yuryevich Grigorenko (Russian: Дмитрий Юрьевич Григоренко; born 14 July 1978) is a Russian politician serving as Deputy Prime Minister of the Russian Federation and Chief of the Government Staff assuming office in January 2020.

He was born in Nizhnevartovsk, Tyumen Region. He graduated from the Kuban State University and Institute of economy at the Kuban institute of the international entrepreneurship and management in the specialty specialized in finance.

== Career ==
He works in Tax inspection in 2000 as a specialist, chief of state tax inspector of Interregional inspectorate for the largest tax payers and was later transferred to Ministry of Taxes and Collection in 2003 working as chief of the state tax inspector of summary analysis department of Department of taxation of profit. He also works at the Federal Tax Service as deputy chief of analysis department, head of department of taxation of commercial organizations and tax accounting of Management of taxation of profit till 2008 where he was made head of the department of administration income tax of commercial organizations and tax accounting of the Management of administration tax income till 2012 he was head of department of income tax and special tax modes and in 2013 he was head of department of taxation in Federal Tax Service and was later deputy manager the Federal Tax Service from October 2013 before he became the deputy prime minister and head of government federation in January 2020.

In May 2020 he joined the supervisory board of VTB replacing Anton Siluanov in the second biggest bank of Russia, a position he assumed in September 2020.

In February 2022, Grigorenko was put on the European Union sanctions list for being "responsible for providing financial and material support, and benefitting from Russian decision-makers responsible for the 2014 Annexation of Crimea by the Russian Federation or the destabilisation of Eastern Ukraine."

In May 2022, the United States Department of the Treasury placed sanctions on Grigorenko pursuant to Executive Order 14024 "for being or having been a leader, official, senior executive officer, or member of the board of directors of the [Government of Russia]."

In 2026 he was removed from his position as Deputy Prime Minister and nominated as deputy chairman of Sberbank.
