= Federal Agency for Fishery =

- Федеральное агентство по рыболовству (Росрыболовство)
- Emblem of the Federal Agency for Fisheries

Agency overview
- Formed: 12 May 2008; 18 years ago
- Agency executive: Ilya Shestakov
- Parent agency: Ministry of Agriculture
- Website: Fish.gov.ru

The Federal Agency for Fishery (Rosrybolovstvo; Russian: Федеральное агентство по рыболовству (Росрыболовство), romanized: Federal'noye agentstvo po rybolovstvu) is a federal body that exercises oversight over fishing and marine life in waters under the territory of the Russian Federation, excluding internal seas as well as the Caspian and Azov seas. It was formed on May 12, 2008 as part of Russia's Ministry of Agriculture.

== Rank insignia ==
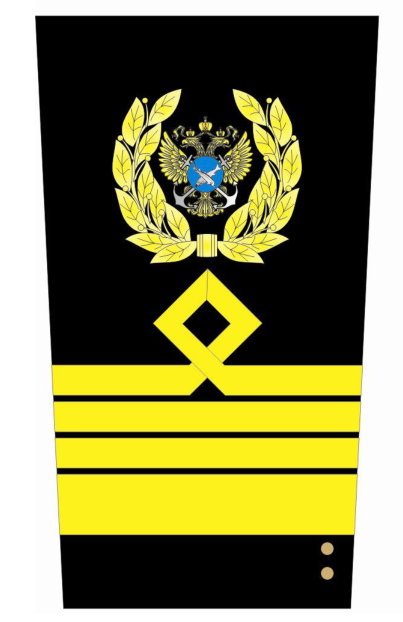
Category 15

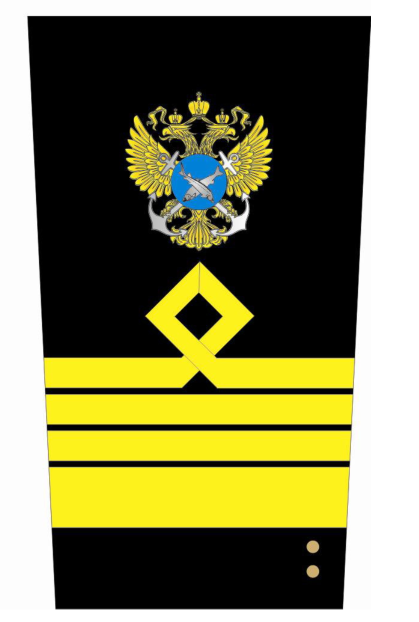
Category 13/14

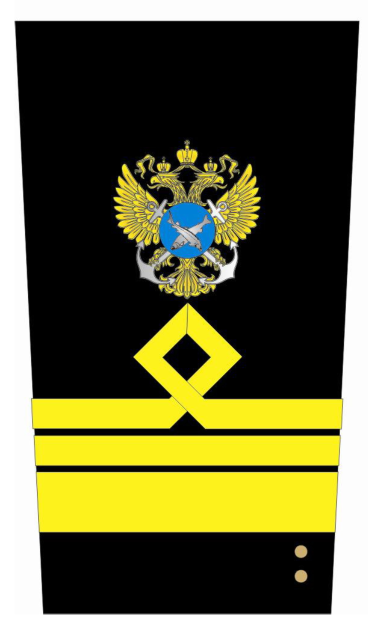
Category 12

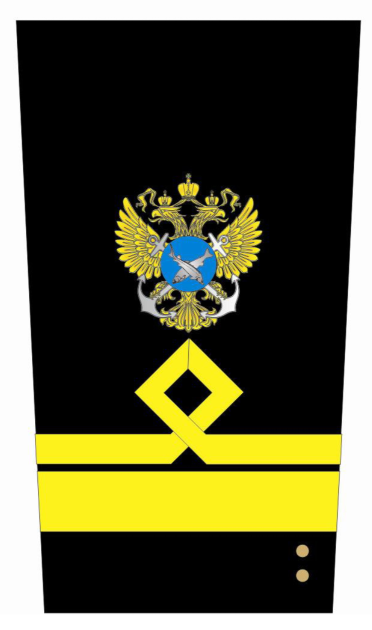
Category 11

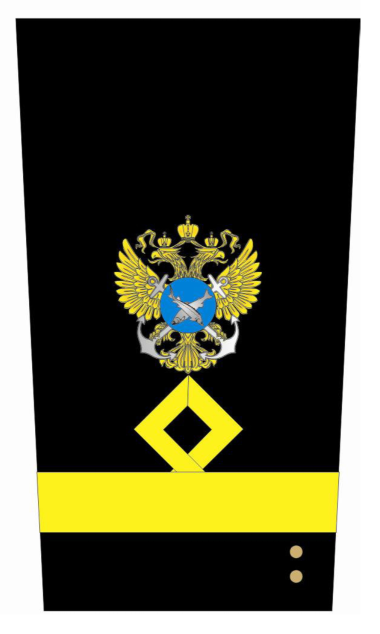
Category 10

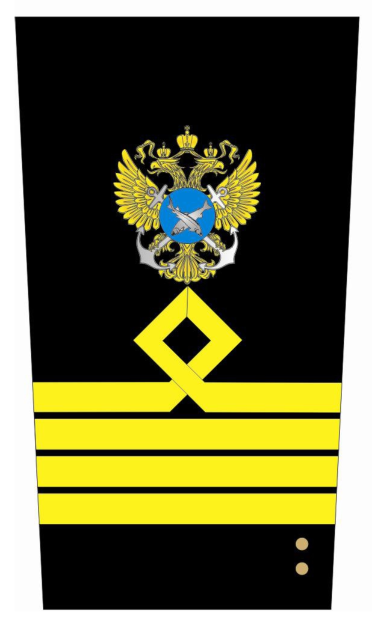
Category 9

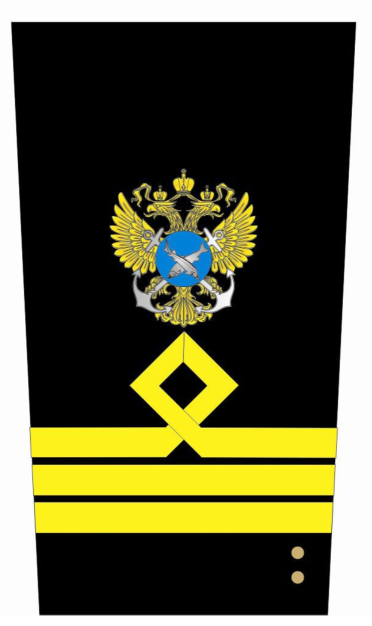
Category 8

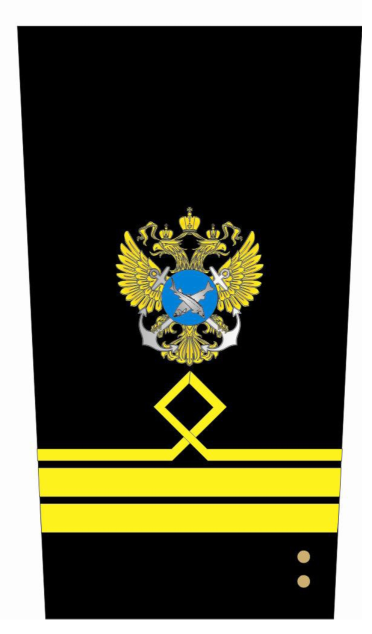
Category 7

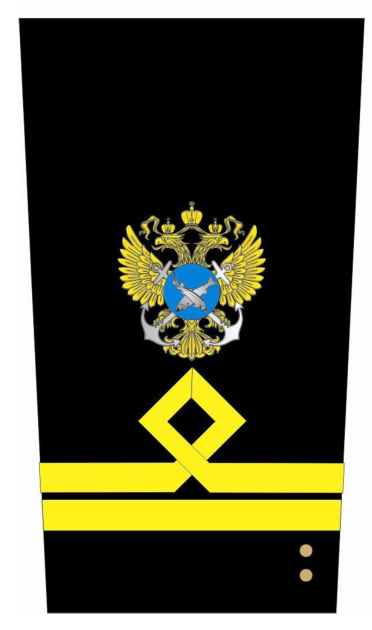
Category 6

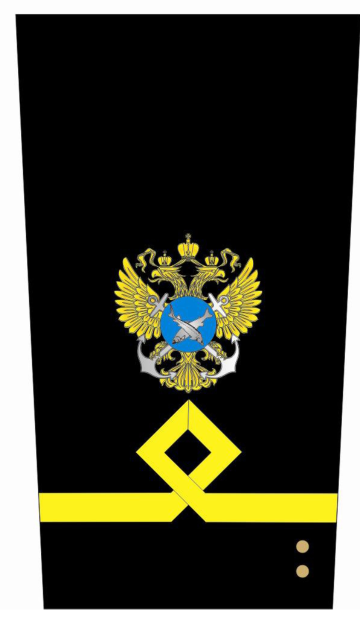
Category 5

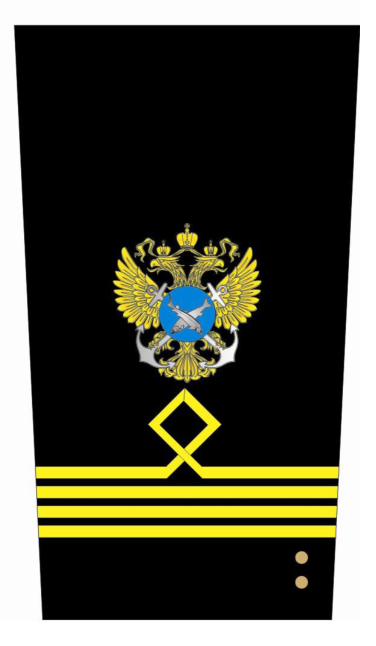
Category 4

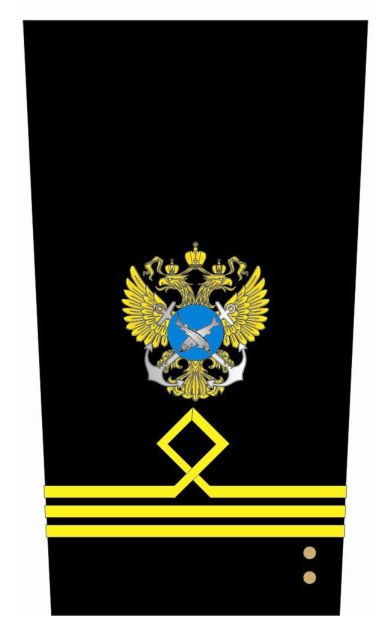
Category 3

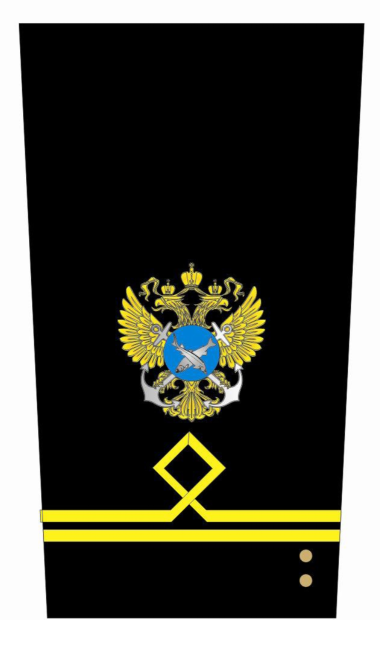
Category 2

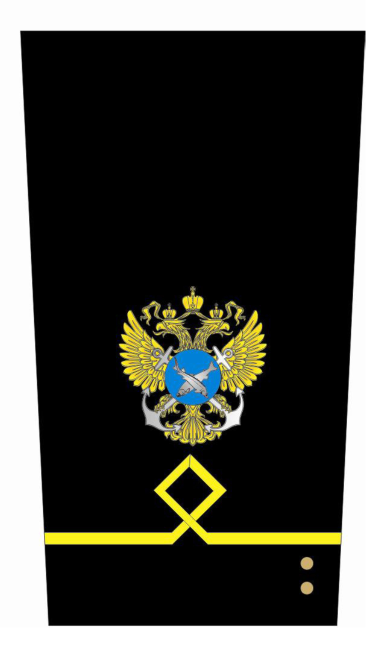
Category 1
