= Federal Service for Veterinary and Phytosanitary Supervision =

Russian government agency

- Федеральная служба по ветеринарному и фитосанитарному надзору (Россельхознадзор)
- Emblem of the Federal Service for Veterinary and Phytosanitary Supervision

- Flag

Agency overview
- Formed: 30 June 2004; 22 years ago
- Headquarters: Orlikov pereulok, 1/11, Moscow, Russia
- Agency executive: Sergei Dankvert
- Parent agency: Ministry of Agriculture
- Website: Fsvps.gov.ru

The Federal Service for Veterinary and Phytosanitary Supervision (Rosselkhoznadzor; Russian: Федеральная служба по ветеринарному и фитосанитарному надзору (Россельхознадзор), romanized: Federal'naya sluzhba po veterinarnomu i fitosanitarnomu nadzoru) is a federal body that exercises oversight over veterinary medicine and agricultural production and byproducts in the Russian Federation. It was formed on June 30, 2004 as part of Russia's Ministry of Agriculture.
