= Vladimir Dzhabarov =

Russian politician (born 1952)

- Владимир Джабаров
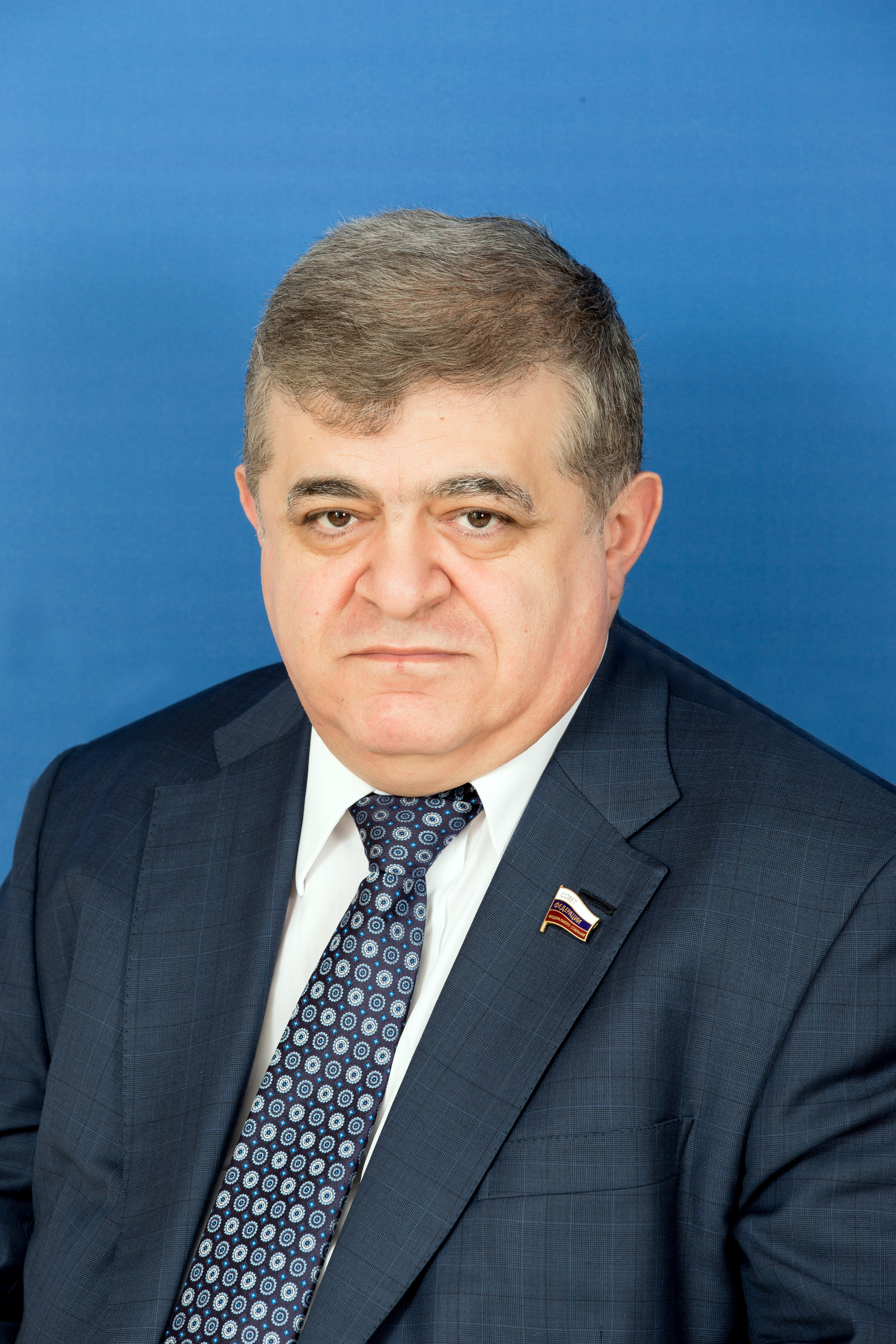
- Official portrait, 2013

Russian Federation Senator from the Jewish Autonomous Oblast
- Incumbent
- Assumed office 24 December 2009
- Preceded by: Boris Listov

Personal details
- Born: Vladimir Mikhailovich Dzhabarov; 29 September 1955 (age 70) Samarkand, Uzbek SSR, Soviet Union
- Party: United Russia

Vladimir Mikhailovich Dzhabarov (Russian: Владимир Михайлович Джабаров; born on 29 September 1952) is an Uzbek-born Russian statesman, politician, and former government agent who is a member of the Federation Council of from the Legislative Assembly of the Jewish Autonomous Oblast since 24 September 2009. He is a member of the United Russia party.

== Early life ==
Vladimir Dzhabarov was born in Samarkand on 29 September 1952. His father is a railway worker, and his mother is a doctor at a railway hospital. He is Armenian by ethnicity, but considers himself Russian.

In 1974, he graduated from the Faculty of Civil Engineering of the Samarkand Institute of Architecture and Civil Engineering, with the qualification of "civil engineer". In 1978, he is postgraduate studies at the Tashkent Polytechnic Institute, and in 1979, he received a Ph.D. degree in technical sciences at the Research Institute of Concrete and Reinforced Concrete under the USSR State Construction Committee, after which he worked as a teacher in Samarkand.

== Career in the security services (1982–2006) ==
In 1982, he graduated from the Higher School of the Red Banner of the KGB, by qualification of a "lawyer" with knowledge of a foreign language, such as Portuguese, with the rank of lieutenant. From 1980 to 2006, he served in the security agencies of the Soviet Union, and Russia, mainly in counterintelligence, worked in the central apparatus of the Federal Security Service, and was deputy and acting head of the "K" department for counterintelligence support of the credit and financial system of the FSB's economic security service. After 26 years of service, he retired with the rank of Major General.

== Senator (2007–present) ==
From 2006 to 2009, he was the first vice president of the investment group Renaissance Capital, and in 2009 - the first vice president of the investment company Troika Dialog, responsible for relations with government agencies. He accidentally met Anatoly Tikhomirov, the head of the Legislative Assembly of the Jewish Autonomous Oblast (JAO).

Dzhabarov was a member of the Legislative Assembly of the Jewish Autonomous Oblast in the fifth convocation (2007) and the sixth convocation. In 2009, he was elected to the Federation Council as a representative from the JAO, and then twice, after being re-elected to the JAO AP in 2011 and 2016, he was again vested with the powers of a senator by decision of the JAO AP deputies.

Dzhabarov is the first deputy chairman of the Federation Council Committee on International Affairs, a member of the Federation Council Commission on Interaction with the Accounts Chamber of Russia, and member of the Federation Council Committee on Affairs of the Commonwealth of Independent States. He is also a member of the Foreign Policy Committee of the Parliamentary Assembly of the Union of Belarus and Russia.

In the midst of a Kosovo flare-up on 1 August 2022 Dzhabarov declared that Russia will not abandon Serbia, and that help such as military support and petroleum subsidies would be on the table if the Serbs decided to resume hostilities.

=== Dzhabarov and Ukraine ===
Dzhabarov supported the 1 March 2014 Decree on the use of the Armed Forces of the Russian Federation on the territory of Ukraine. Dzhabarov was sanctioned on 20 March 2014 by the US Treasury because of this support.

As the chairman of the Temporary Commission of the Federation Council on monitoring the situation in Ukraine, and a member of the observer mission from the Federation Council at the March 2014 Crimean status referendum, he invigilated the referendum that "it was held clearly and legitimately". Marveling at the "enthusiasm with which people go to the referendum," he noted that "the voting results are impressive" - "more than 95 percent of the republic's population voted for Crimea to become part of Russia."

He has been since 2014 "thanks to the active work of the committee" in Ukraine included in the sanctions lists in several countries, particularly the United States, the United Kingdom, the European Union, Montenegro, Iceland, Albania, Liechtenstein, Norway, Canada, Australia and Switzerland.

Despite the sanctions, in 2015 he was greeted with applause in the Federal Assembly of Switzerland, visiting this country as part of the delegation of the Federation Council, of which Yury Vorobyov was also a member, who is also a figurant of the sanctions lists.

In 2018, the Italian Foreign Ministry refused to issue an entry visa to Dzhabarov, who was going to become the only observer from Russia in the parliamentary elections as part of the OSCE Parliamentary Assembly mission.

In the wake of the 2022 Russian invasion of Ukraine the Šimonytė Cabinet of Lithuania was in June rumoured to be considering extending its sanctions regime to goods transiting its territory from Russia to its exclave Kaliningrad. An objection from Dzhabarov led to the termination of the Lithuanian plan.

== Personal life ==
He is married. By 2016, he declared an annual income of 6 million rubles, as well as 1 land plot, 2 residential buildings, 4 apartments, 3 parking spaces and 3 cars, a Lexus LS, a Porsche Cayenne and a Volkswagen Touareg. Most of the property is in the name of the wife.
