= Russian Agricultural Bank =

Russian bank

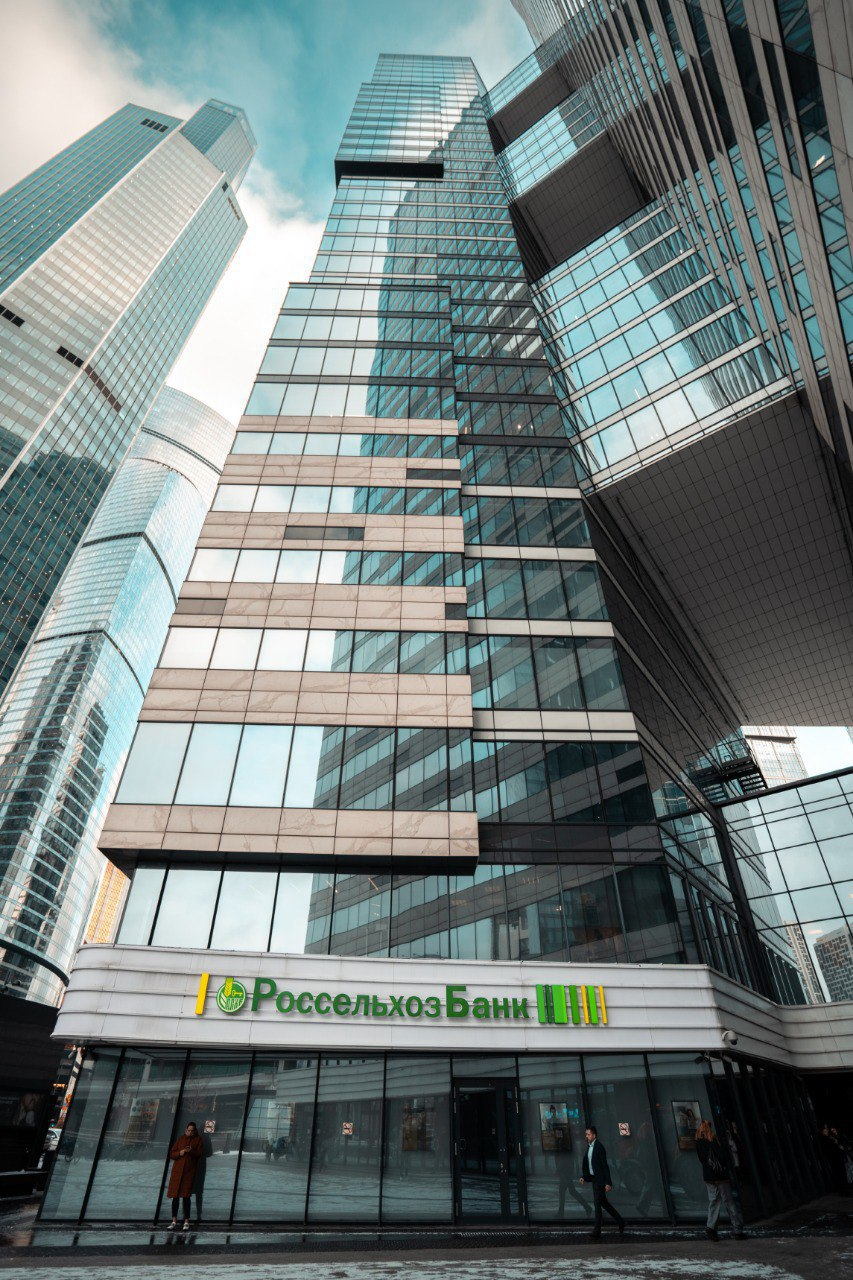
- Russian Agricultural Bank headquarters, the 33 story building (from left) in IQ-quarter in Moscow-City
- Native name: Россельхозбанк
- Type: Public
- Industry: Financial services
- Founded: 2000-03-15
- Founder: Russian Government
- Headquarters: Moscow, Russia
- Key people: Boris Listov — Chairman of the Management Board Dmitry Patrushev — Chairman of the Supervisory Board
- Services: Banking
- Revenue: RUB 258 billion (2017)
- Operating income: RUB 41 billion (2023)
- Net income: RUB 39.8 billion (2024)
- Total assets: RUB 4.74 trillion (2023)
- Total equity: RUB 298.07 billion (2023)
- Owner: Federal Agency for State Property Management (72.4%)
- Number of employees: 34 200 (2024)
- Website: www.rshb.ru/en/

Russian Agricultural Bank (Russian: Россельхозбанк, romanized: Rosselkhozbank) is a 100% state-owned bank regulated by the Bank of Russia. RusAg provides lending support to Russian agribusiness companies.

== History ==
Modern agribusiness production systems are capital intensive. A large portion of capital used in agribusiness is borrowed. The agrarian credit system in Russia goes back to 1882 when the first specialized banks – ‘Peasant Land Bank’ and ‘Gentry Land Bank’ – were established. During the Soviet period, about 90% of all long-term loans were extended to agribusiness.

The Russian Agricultural Bank (RusAg) was set up on March 15, 2000 under the special decree of the acting president of the Russian Federation Vladimir Putin with the mission to be the conductor of the state credit and financial policy in the agribusiness sector, to facilitate a strong performance by clients, to invest in the core businesses and technology and to be the basis of the national credit and financial system of agribusiness in the Russian Federation.

100% of RusAg’s shares are controlled by the Russian Federation acting through the Federal Agency for Managing State Property which holds the bank's issued and outstanding ordinary shares (78.66% from total share capital (31 December 2018: 77.11% from total share capital)), the Ministry of Finance of the Russian Federation which holds the bank's issued and outstanding preference shares (5.69% from total share capital (31 December 2018: 6.1% from total share capital)) and the State Corporation "Deposit Insurance Agency" which holds the bank's issued and outstanding preference shares (15.65% from total share capital (31 December 2018: 16.79% from total share capital)).

Dmitry Nikolaevich Patrushev has been the chairman of the bank's supervisory board since June 2018.

In 2020, the bank launched its Svoe.Farming ecosystem, which is designed for the comprehensive digitalization of small enterprises engaged in the agro-industrial complex, and also helps with the sale of farm products using the Svoe Rodnoye marketplace. In 2022, the Svoe ecosystem united over 30 business services and subplatforms.

== Financial performance ==
As of January 2010, Russian Agricultural Bank ranked third among Russian banks by capital (157.7 billion rubles) and fourth by net assets (951.4 billion rubles).

Since 2010, the bank has received approximately 300 billion rubles in state support. Beginning in 2014, it reported losses under IFRS; however, by the end of 2017, losses had decreased nearly threefold—from 58.9 billion to 19.5 billion rubles. In the first quarter of 2018, the bank returned to profitability, posting a net profit of 876 million rubles. As of June 1, 2018, it ranked fourth in the Russian banking system by assets, totaling 3.5 trillion rubles.

The group’s net profit under IFRS amounted to 1.4 billion rubles in the first half of 2020. As of February 1, 2021, the bank’s net assets stood at 4.0 trillion rubles, with own funds of 0.5 trillion rubles; net profit for 2020 reached 2.2 billion rubles. By February 2022, the bank ranked sixth in Russia by net assets (4.219 trillion rubles).

In 2023, the bank increased its IFRS net profit to 31.8 billion rubles. Over the same year, the group’s loan portfolio (before provisions) grew by 306.1 billion rubles (9.0 percent), reaching 3.7 trillion rubles. As of 2023, the bank ranked fifth among Russian banks by both total assets (4.54 trillion rubles) and capital (583.4 billion rubles).

Net profit under IFRS amounted to 26 billion rubles in the first half of 2024, nearly 70 percent higher year-on-year. For the full year 2024, the bank reported a 25 percent increase in net profit, reaching 39.8 billion rubles.

== Sanctions ==
This bank has been sanctioned by the United Kingdom since 1 August 2014, with additional sanctions in December 2023 which ban correspondent banking relationships.

On February 24, 2022, US President Joe Biden imposed economic sanctions on RusAg and other Russian financial institutions in response to Russia's invasion of Ukraine.

The European Union imposed full sanctions on RusAg in 2022. This included a full exclusion from the SWIFT network, having all its assets in the union frozen, restrictions on dealing with the bank, and a ban on financial services from EU firms.

On 18 July 2025, the European Union imposed the 18th package of sanctions on Russia which caused UnionPay network cards issued card by RusAg to stop working in the EU from July 20 2025. These cards were one the most popular methods of payment abroad for Russians after the exit of Visa and Mastercard in 2022 whose cards issued in Russia ceased working abroad. Similarly, some foreign issued UnionPay cards also ceased working at RusAg terminals and ATMs in Russia.
