= Ministry of Agriculture (Russia) =

Government minister of Russia

Ministry of Agriculture of the Russian Federation
- Министерство сельского хозяйства Российской Федерации; Ministerstvo selskogo khozyaystva Rossiiskoi Federatsii

- Logo of the Ministry of Agriculture of Russia

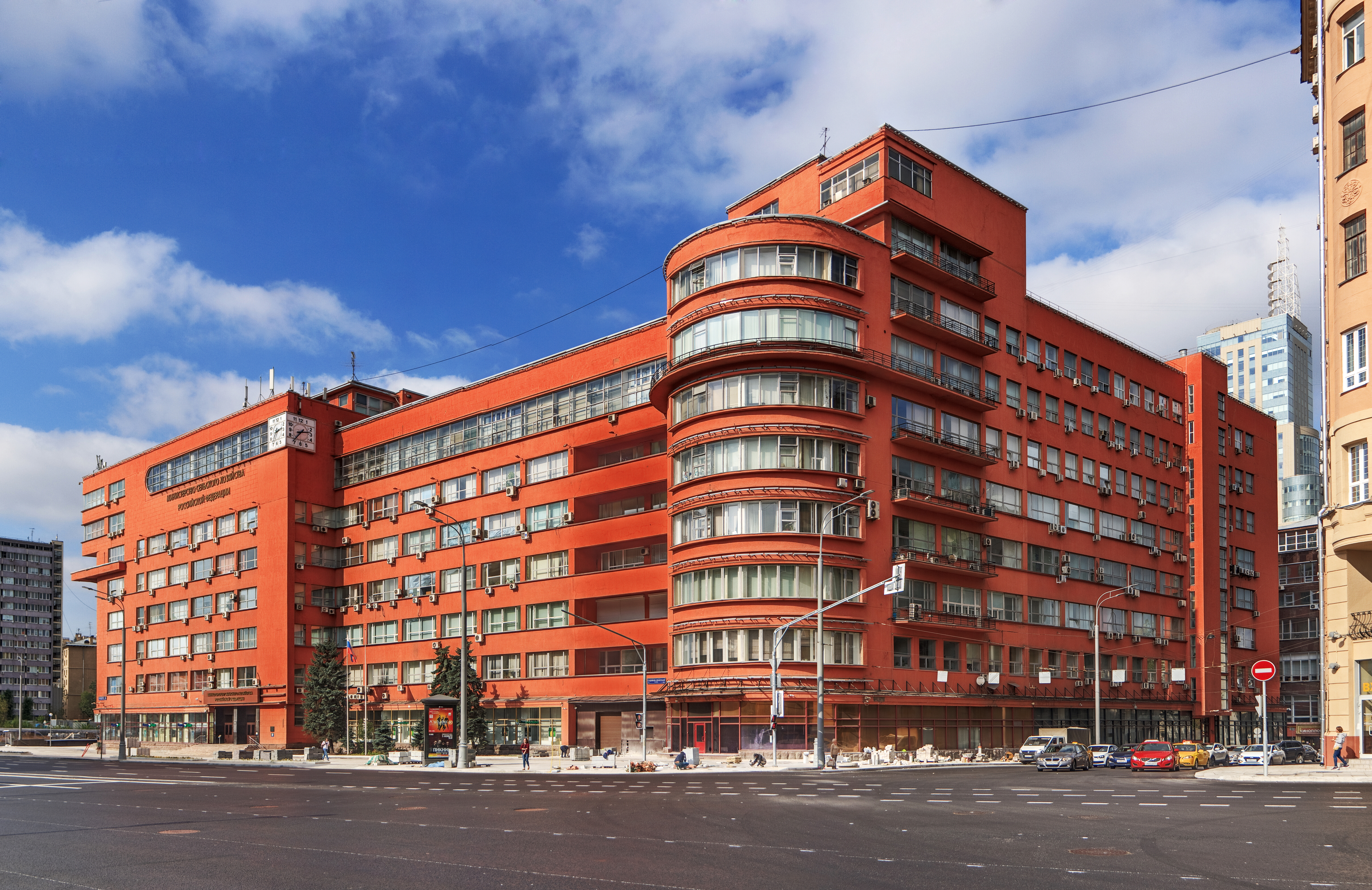
- Narkomzem Building, Ministry Headquarters

Agency overview
- Jurisdiction: Government of Russia
- Headquarters: Orlikov pereulok 1/11, Krasnoselsky District, Moscow; 55°46′13.48″N 37°38′44.05″E
- Minister responsible: Oksana Lut
- Child agency: Federal Service for Veterinary and Phytosanitary Supervision, Federal Agency for Fishery
- Website: mcx.gov.ru

The Ministry of Agriculture of the Russian Federation (Russian: Министерство сельского хозяйства Российской Федерации, romanized: Ministerstvo selskogo khozyaystva Rossiyskoy Federatsii) is a ministry of the Government of Russia responsible for agricultural production, soil conservation, rural development, agricultural market regulation, and financial stabilization of the farm sector.

The Ministry of Agriculture is subdivided into functional departments including the Federal Agency for Fishery and the Federal Service for Veterinary and Phytosanitary Supervision. It was formed from the Russian SFSR branch of the Ministry of Agriculture and Food in 1990 and is headquartered in the Narkomzem Building in Krasnoselsky District, Moscow.

Oksana Lut has been Minister of Agriculture since 14 May 2024.

== History ==
The first Imperial Russian ministry to deal with agricultural and rural issues was the Ministry of State Assets of the Russian Empire, formed in 1837. Successor ministries were:

Ministry of Cultivation and State Property of the Russian Empire (1894–1905)
Main Directorate for Land Use and Cultivation of the Russian Empire (1905–1915)
Ministry of Cultivation of the Russian Empire (1915–1917)
Ministry of Cultivation of the Provisional Government of Russia (1917)
People's Commissariat of Cultivation of the RSFSR (1917–1931)
People's Commissariat of Cultivation of the USSR (1929–1946)
People's Commissariat of Grain and Livestock State Farms of the USSR (1932–1946)
People's Commissariat of Procurement of the USSR (1938–1946)
People's Commissariat of Industrial Crops of the USSR (1945–1946)
Ministry of Cultivation of the USSR (1946–1947)
Ministry of Procurement of the USSR (1946–1953, 1953–1956, 1969–1985)
Ministry of Industrial Crops of the USSR (1946–1947)
Ministry of Livestock of the USSR (1946–1947)
Ministry of Agriculture of the USSR (1947–1953)
Ministry of State Farms of the USSR (1947–1953, 1953–1957)
Ministry of Cotton of the USSR (1950–1953)
Ministry of Agriculture and Procurement of the USSR (1953)
Ministry of Agriculture of the USSR (1953–1985)
Ministry of Grain Products of the USSR (1956–1958, 1985–1989)
State Committee of the Council of Ministers of the USSR for Grain Products (1958–1961)
State Committee of Procurement of the Council of Ministers of the USSR (1961–1969)
Ministry of Fruit and Vegetables of the USSR (1980–1985)
State Agroindustrial Committee (Gosagroprom) (1985–1989)
Ministry of Agriculture and Food of the USSR (1991)
Ministry of Agriculture and Food of the RSFSR (1990–1991)
Ministry of Agriculture of the RSFSR (1991)
Ministry of Agriculture of the Russian Federation (1991–1992, 1994)
Ministry of Agriculture and Food of the Russian Federation (1992–1993, 1994–2000)

n 1959, by order of Nikita Khrushchev the ministry was transferred from Moscow to Mikhailovskoye (Shishkin Les, Podolsk district, Moscow region). The USSR Ministry of Agriculture occupied the former Sheremetyev estate.; construction of a settlement for employees began, but three years later the ministry was returned to Moscow-

November 22, 1985 and all ministries were transformed into the State Agro-Industrial Committee of the USSR (Gosagroprom USSR).

On April 10, 1989, the State Commission of the Council of Ministers of the USSR on Food and Procurement was established on the basis of the State Agro-Industrial Committee of the USSR.

On July 14, 1990, the Ministry of Agriculture and Food of the RSFSR was established on the basis of the State Agro-Industrial Committee of the RSFSR.

From April 1 to December 1, 1991 — the Ministry of Agriculture and Food of the USSR.

From November 15, 1991 to September 30, 1992 — the Ministry of Agriculture of the RSFSR / Russian Federation.

From September 30, 1992 to May 17, 2000 — the Ministry of Agriculture and Food of the Russian Federation.

From May 17, 2000 to the present — the Ministry of Agriculture of the Russian Federation.

== See also ==
- People's Commissariat for Agriculture
- Agriculture in Russia
- Agriculture in the Soviet Union
- Agriculture in the Russian Empire

== Bibliography ==
- Volin, Lazar, Century of Russian Agriculture, From Alexander II to Khrushchev.
- Шилов, Д. Н. Государственные деятели Российской империи 1802—1917. С.-Петербург, 2002.
- Государственная власть СССР. Высшие органы власти и управления и их руководители. 1923—1991 гг. Москва, 1999.
