= Apparatus of the Government of Russia =

Executive bureaucracy of the Russian Federation

The Apparatus of the Government of the Russian Federation (Russian: Аппарат правительства Российской Федерации) is a governmental body formed to ensure the activities of the Russian government and the prime minister as well as to monitor the implementation of orders and resolutions adopted by the government.

== History ==
On October 19, 1905, the Council of Ministers of the Russian Empire was formed for the general "management and consolidation of the actions of the chief heads of departments in the subjects of both legislation and higher public administration." The body received an independent status and the right to make key decisions, whereas in the previous format it was an advisory body to the Emperor and met by his order. The Council of Ministers began to meet weekly, the results were recorded in special magazines. The Council was headed not by the emperor, but by one of the ministers.

The clerical work was carried out by the permanent office, which was headed by the managing director of the Council of Ministers.

On February 27, 1917, the Council of Ministers ceased operations during the February Revolution. On March 2 of the same year, the Provisional Government was formed, on the day of the abdication of Nicholas II from the throne. Accordingly, the Office of the Council of Ministers was renamed the Office of the Provisional Government. The first managing director was a member of the State Duma of the first convocation Vladimir Dmitrievich Nabokov, and the position of assistant to the UD was held by Vladimir Vasilievich Nikitin н. The business manager was obliged not only to organize the work of the Provisional Government, ensuring the holding of its meetings, but also to carry out activities to bring the decisions made to the public.

On October 27, 1917, the Council of People's Commissars of the Russian Soviet Federative Socialist Republic was formed. The office was renamed to business administration and for a long time kept its name. On July 6, 1923, the Council of People's Commissars of the Soviet Union became the highest executive body. In 1946, transformed into the Council of Ministers of the Soviet Union.

Simultaneously with the union government, the government of Russia (RSFSR) acted. In 1917-1946, under the name of the Council of People's Commissars of the RSFSR, and since 1946 - the Council of Ministers of the RSFSR.

On August 3, 1979, the RSFSR Law On the Council of Ministers of the RSFSR was adopted, in which a separate article (34) was devoted to the Office of the Council of Ministers of the RSFSR.. The apparatus of the Government was the administration of the affairs of the Council of Ministers of the RSFSR, preparing issues for consideration by the Council of Ministers of the RSFSR and providing a systematic verification of the implementation of decisions of the CPSU (until March 14, 1990) and the Government. The business manager was a member of the Council of Ministers.

By decree of the President of the RSFSR of November 6, 1991 No. 172, the apparatus of the Government of the RSFSR and which was included as an independent structural unit in the administration of the president of the RSFSR (actually expired on January 10, 1993 with the beginning of the work of the Office of the Council of Ministers of the Russian Federation, официально отменен 4 февраля 1993 года, was officially canceled on February 4, 1993). The leadership of the Government apparatus was entrusted to the First Deputy Chairman of the Government (until November 11, 1991, when the head of the apparatus was appointed, who was not part of the government by position).

At the same time, the law “On the Council of Ministers of the RSFSR” formally continued to operate, which was recognized as invalid only in January 1993, in connection with the adoption of the law “On the Council of Ministers - the Government of the Russian Federation” (the law was adopted in December 1992, but entered by virtue of January 12, 1993, after the Law of the Russian Federation of December 9, 1992 “On Amendments and Additions to the Constitution (Fundamental Law) of the Russian Federation - Russia”). To ensure the activities of the Council of Ministers of the Russian Federation, the Office of the Council of Ministers of the Russian Federation was formed instead of the Administrative Department (Article 32). The appointment and dismissal of the chief of staff is carried out by the President of the Russian Federation on the proposal of the Prime Minister of the Russian Federation. In accordance with Art. 7 of the same law, the chief of staff was a member of the Council of Ministers.

At the end of 1993, in December, the Constitution of the Russian Federation was adopted. Formally, some of the provisions of the law “On the Council of Ministers - the Government of the Russian Federation” did not comply with some of its provisions. First of all, the activities of the Government of the Russian Federation should be determined by Federal Constitutional Law. The corresponding Federal Constitutional Law “On the Government of the Russian Federation” was adopted on December 17, 1997. To ensure the activities of the Government of the Russian Federation and the organization of control over the implementation by executive bodies of decisions adopted by the Government, the Office of the Government of the Russian Federation was formed. The Regulation on the Government Office of the Russian Federation was approved by Resolution of the Government of Russia No. 260 signed on June 1, 2004 (simultaneously with the approval of the regulations of the Government of the Russian Federation).

== Duties and tasks ==
The main tasks of the Office of the Government of the Russian Federation are considered to be the organization of the activities of the Government of Russia, as well as the monitoring of the execution of orders by federal executive bodies. Key functions of the Office of the Government of Russia:

- Development of the main areas of activity for the implementation of domestic and foreign policy of Russia;
- Preparation of expert opinions on draft acts and other documents submitted to the Government of Russia requiring a decision;
- Control over the implementation by executive bodies of decisions of the Government of Russia, as well as instructions of the Chairman of the Government and his deputies;
- Represents the interests of the Government of Russia in the Constitutional and Supreme Courts;
- Prepares materials for the Chairman of the Government for his reports and speeches;
- Provides the organization of protocol events;
- Ensures record keeping, observance of the secrecy regime and protection of information constituting state and other secrets protected by law.
