= List of institutions of higher education in Russia =

The following is a list of universities and other higher educational institutions in Russia, based primarily on the National Information Centre on Academic Recognition and Mobility webpage of the Ministry of Education and Science of the Russian Federation.

The list is arranged in alphabetical order. However, some established names in the Russian language differ from the translations offered below. Occasionally, the names of cities in English are also mentioned alphabetically, although they might not be a part of the actual title. See also: List of medical schools in Russia.

== Higher educational institutions ==
=== Abakan ===
- Abakan State Institute of Education
- Abakan State University of Pedagogy
- Khakassian State University

=== Angarsk ===
- Angarsk State Technical Academy

=== Arkhangelsk ===
- Arkyhangelsk State Technical University (1929)
- Northern (Arctic) Federal University
- Northern State Medical University (Arkhyangelsk State Medical University)

=== Armavir ===
- Armavir State Pedagogical University

=== Astrakhan ===
- Astrakhan State Technical University
- Astrakhan State Medical University
- Astrakhan State University, former Astrakhan State Pedagogical University
- Astrakhan State Conservatoire

=== Barnaul ===
- Altai State Medical University
- Altai State Technical University
- Altai State University
- Barnaul State Pedagogical University

=== Belgorod ===
- Belgorod Shukhov state technological university
- Belgorod State Technological Academy of Construction Materials
- Belgorod State University
- Belgorod University of Cooperation Economics and Law

=== Biysk ===
- Altai State Humanities Pedagogical University (1939)
- Biysk Technological Institute

=== Birobidzhan ===
- Sholem Aleichem Amur State University

=== Blagoveshchensk ===
- Amur State University
- Blagoveshchensk State Pedagogical University
- Far Eastern State Agrarian University

=== Bratsk ===
- Bratsk State Technical University

=== Bryansk ===
- Bryansk State University
- Bryansk State Agrarian University
- Bryansk State Engineering Technical University
- Bryansk State Technical University

=== Chelyabinsk ===
- Chelyabinsk State University (1976)
- South Ural State University (1943)
- Chelyabinsk Medical Academy (1922)
- Chelyabinsk State Pedagogical University

=== Cherepovets ===
- Cherepovets State University

=== Chita ===
- Chita State University
- Chita State Academy of Medicine
- Chita State University of Polytechnics

=== Cheboksary ===
- Chuvash State University
- Cheboksary Cooperative Institute

=== Dubna ===
- Dubna International University of Nature, Society, and Human

=== Elista ===
- Kalmyk State University

=== Glazov ===
- Glazov State Pedagogical Institute (1939)

=== Gorno-Altaisk ===
- Gorno-Altaisk State University

=== Grozny ===
- Chechen State University
- Chechen State Pedagogical University
- Grozny State Petroleum Technical University

=== Irkutsk ===
- Baykalsky State University of Economics and Law
- Irkutsk National Research Technical University (1930)
- Irkutsk State Academy of Agriculture
- Irkutsk State Academy of Economics (Irkutsk Economics Academy)
- Irkutsk State Linguistic University (1948)
- Irkutsk State University (1918)
- Irkutsk State Medical University
- Irkutsk State Pedagogical College

=== Ivanovo ===
- Ivanovo State Power Engineering University
- Ivanovo State University
- Ivanovo State University of Chemistry and Technology
- Ivanovo State Polytechnical University

=== Izhevsk ===
- Kalashnikov Izhevsk State Technical University
- Izhevsk State Agricultural Academy
- Izhevsk State Medical Academy
- Udmurt State University

=== Kaliningrad ===
- Kaliningrad State Technical University
- Kant Russian State University (1967), former Kaliningrad State University

=== Kaluga ===
- Kaluga State University (1948)
- Tziolkovsky Kaluga State Pedagogical University

=== Kazan ===
- Bauman Kazan State Academy of Veterinary Medicine
- Kazan State Medical University
- Kazan State University of Architecture and Engineering
- Kazan State Institute of Culture
- Kazan State Conservatory
- Kazan State Power Engineering University (1968)
- Kazan Federal University (1804)
- Russian Islamic Institute
- Kazan National Research Technical University named after A.N. Tupolev
- Kazan National Research Technological University

=== Kemerovo ===
- Kemerovo Institute of Food Science and Technology
- Kemerovo State University (1973)
- Kemerovo State Medical University
- Kemerovo State Agricultural Institute
- Kemerovo State Institute of Culture (1969)
- Kuzbass State Technical University (1950)
- Kuzbass State University

=== Kirov ===
- Vyatka State University
- Kirov State Medical University

=== Khabarovsk ===
- Pacific National University, former Khabarovsk State Technical University (founded in 1958)
- Far Eastern State Medical University
- Far Eastern State Transport University
- Far Eastern State University of Humanities

=== Kolomna ===
- State University of Humanities and Social Studies

=== Komsomolsk-on-Amur ===
- Komsomolsk-on-Amur State Pedagogical University of Humanities
- Komsomolsk-on-Amur State Technical University

=== Kostroma ===
- Kostroma State University
- Kostroma State Agricultural Academy
- Kostroma Timoshenko Academy of NBC Defence
- Kostroma State Technological University (merged with Kostroma State University)

=== Krasnodar ===
- Krasnodar State University of Arts and Culture
- Kuban State Agrarian University
- Kuban State Technological University
- Kuban State University (1970)
- Kuban State Medical University
- Kuban State University of Sport and Tourism

=== Krasnoyarsk ===
- Krasnoyarsk State Agrarian University
- Krasnoyarsk State Institute of Trade and Economics
- Krasnoyarsk State Medical Academy (Russian abbreviation is KrasGMA) (1942)
- Krasnoyarsk State Pedagogical University (Russian abbreviation is KGPU) (1932)
- Krasnoyarsk State Technical University (Russian abbreviation is KGTU) (1956)
- Krasnoyarsk State University (Russian abbreviation is KGU) (1963) (started as a division of Novosibirsk State University, became a standalone university in 1969)
- Siberian Federal University
- Siberian State Aerospace University
- Krasnoyarsk State Medical University

=== Kurgan ===
- Kurgan State University
- Kurgan FSB Border Guard Academy
- Kurgan Maltsev State Agricultural Academy
- Kurgan State Railway Institute

=== Kursk ===
- Kursk State University
- Kursk State Medical University
- Kursk State Technical University
- Prof. Ivanov Kursk State Agricultural Academy

=== Kyzyl ===
- Tuvan State University

=== Lipetsk ===
- Lipetsk State Technical University
- Lipetsk State Pedagogical University

=== Magadan ===
- North-Eastern State University

=== Magas ===
- Ingush State University

=== Maikop ===
- Adyghe State University

=== Makhachkala ===
- Dagestan State University
- Dagestan State Pedagogical University
- Dagestan State Technical University

=== Michurinsk ===
- Michurinsk State Agrarian University

=== Magnitogorsk ===
- Magnitogorsk State Conservatory
- Magnitogorsk State Pedagogical Institute

=== Mirny ===
- Mirny Polytechnic Institute

=== Moscow ===
- Academic Law University of the Institute of State and Law of the Russian Academy of Sciences
- Academy of State Fire-Prevention Service of the MIA of Russia
- Academy of the National Economy, attached to the Government of RF
- All-Russian Academy of Foreign Trade
- All-Russian Institute of Continuous Education in Forestry
- Bauman Moscow State Technical University (a.k.a. Moscow State Technical University) (1830)
- Academic Music College - Tchaikovsky Moscow State Conservatory
- Financial University under the Government of the Russian Federation (1919)
- Gerasimov Institute of Cinematography
- Gnessin State Musical College Moscow
- Gubkin Russian State University of Oil and Gas
- Higher Academic School of Graphic Design
- Higher Chemical College of the Russian Academy of Sciences
- Higher School of Economics
- Higher School of Religion and Philosophy
- Independent University of Moscow
- Institute of Asian and African Countries
- Institute of Cryptography, Communication, and informatics by the Academy of FSS of Russia
- Institute for Theoretical and Experimental Physics
- Institute of Topical Education “UrInfo-MSU”
- International Academy for Business and New Technologies
- International Academy of Business and Banking
- International Institute of Economics and Law
- International University in Moscow
- International University of Fundamental Studies
- Kosygin Russian State University (1930)
- Kutafin Moscow State Law University
- Maimonid State Classical Academy
- Moscow Polytechnic University
- Marysky State University
- MATI Russian State Technological University
- Mendeleev Russian University of Chemistry and Technology
- Military Academy of Air Defence Forces of Russian Federation
- Military Academy of Communication
- Military Academy of Supreme Staff
- Moscow Academy for Tourism, Hotel and Catering Business
- Moscow Academy of Government and Municipal Management
- Moscow Architectural Institute
- Moscow Automobile and Road Construction State Technical University
- Moscow Aviation Institute (State Technical University)
- Moscow City University
- Moscow City University of Psychology and Education (1996)
- Moscow Conservatory
- Moscow Engineering Physics Institute (a.k.a. National Research Nuclear University MEPhI (Moscow Engineering Physics Institute))
- Moscow Institute of Economics, Management, and Law
- Moscow Institute of Electronic Technology (Technical University)
- Moscow Institute of Physics and Technology
- Moscow Medical Academy
- Moscow Pedagogical University
- Moscow Power Engineering Institute
- Moscow State Academic School of 1905 Year Memory
- Moscow State Academy of Veterinary Medicine and Biotechnology
- Moscow State Aviation Technological University (MATI)
- Moscow State Construction University
- Moscow State Geological Prospecting Institute
- Moscow State Industrial University
- Moscow State Institute of Electronics and Mathematics
- Moscow State Institute of International Relations
- Moscow State Institute of Motorcars and Roads
- Moscow State Institute of Physics and Engineering (Technical University)
- Moscow State Institute of Radio-engineering Electronics and Automation
- Moscow State Institute of Steel and Alloys
- Moscow State Law University (Kutafin University)
- Moscow State Linguistic University
- Moscow State Mining University
- Moscow State Night Metallurgical Institute
- Moscow State Open University
- Moscow State Pedagogical University
- Moscow State Social University
- Moscow State Technical University (a.k.a. Bauman Moscow State Technical University) (1830)
- Moscow State Technical University of Civil Aviation
- Moscow State Technological University (a.k.a. STANKIN) (1930)
- Moscow State University (1755)
- Moscow State University of Agriculture Engineering
- Moscow State University of Applied Biotechnology
- Moscow State University of Civil Engineering
- Moscow State University of Commerce
- Moscow State University of Communication
- Moscow State University of Culture and Arts
- Moscow State University of Economics, Statistics, and Informatics
- Moscow State University of Environment Organization
- Moscow State University of Fine Chemical Technologies (MITHT) (1900)
- Moscow State University of Food Productions
- Moscow State University of Forestry
- Moscow State University of Geodesy and Cartography
- Moscow State University of Instrument Engineering and Computer Science
- Moscow State University of Printing Arts
- Moscow State University of Railway Engineering (MIIT, 1896)
- Moscow State University of Service
- Moscow State University of Technology "Stankin" (a.k.a. STANKIN) (1930)
- Moscow Technical University of Communication and Informatics
- Moscow Technological Institute
- Moscow University of the Ministry of Internal Affairs of the Russian Federation
- Russian State Agrarian University - Moscow Timiryazev Agricultural Academy
- Moscow University for the Humanities (1944)
- Moscow University of Consumer Cooperation
- Moscow University of Geodesy and Cartography
- Moscow University for the Humanities
- National Research University of Electronic Technology
- National University of Science and Technology MISiS
- Peoples' Friendship University of Russia (1960)
- Plekhanov Russian University of Economics, previously known as Moscow Commercial Institute (found in 1907)
- Russian Academy of Public Service, attached to the President of RF
- Russian New University (1991)
- Russian Palaeoentomological School (1980)
- Russian Presidential Academy of National Economy and Public Administration - RANEPA
- Russian State Geological Prospecting University - MGRI
- Russian State Hydrometeorological University
- Russian State Medical University
- Russian State Social University
- Russian State University for the Humanities (РГГУ), Moscow (1991)
- Russian State University of Innovation Technologies and Entrepreneurship
- Russian State University of Trade and Economy
- Russian State Vocational Pedagogical University (РГППУ), Yekaterinburg
- Saint Tikhon's Orthodox University
- Russian State University of Tourism and Services Studies
- Sholokhov Moscow State University for Humanities
- Sechenov Moscow Medical Academy
- Skolkovo Institute of Science and Technology
- Stankin Moscow State Technical University (a.k.a. STANKIN) (1930)
- State Academy of Natural Gas and Oil
- State University of Farming
- State University of Land Use Planning
- State University of Management
- Stroganov Moscow Arts and Industrial Institute
- Moscow Surikov State Academic Institute of Fine Arts

=== Murmansk ===
- Murmansk State Technical University
- Murmansk Arctic University

=== Nalchik ===
- Kabardino-Balkarian State University
- Kabardino-Balkarian State Agrarian University

=== Nizhnevartovsk ===
- Nizhnevartovsk State University

=== Nizhny Novgorod ===
- N. A. Dobrolyubova State Linguistic University of Nizhny Novgorod
- N. I. Lobachevsky State University of Nizhny Novgorod (1918)
- Nizhny Novgorod State Medical Academy
- Nizhny Novgorod State Technical University
- Nizhny Novgorod State University of Architecture and Civil Engineering
- Volga State University of Water Transport
- Minin Nizhny Novgorod State Pedagogical University
- Nizhny Novgorod State Architectural University
- Privolzhsky Research Medical University

=== Novgorod ===
- Novgorod State University

=== Novocherkassk ===
- South Russian State Polytechnical Institute

=== Novokuznetsk ===
- Novokuznetsk State University of Pedagogy
- Siberian State Industrial University

=== Novorossiysk ===
- Ushakov State Maritime University

=== Novosibirsk ===
- Novosibirsk State University (1959)
- Novosibirsk State Technical University (1950)
- Novosibirsk State University of Economics and Management (1929)
- Novosibirsk State Agricultural University (1936)
- Novosibirsk State University of Architecture, Design and Arts (1989)
- Novosibirsk State University of Architecture and Civil Engineering (1930)
- Novosibirsk State Medical University (1935)
- Novosibirsk State Pedagogical University (1935)
- Novosibirsk State Theater Institute (1960)
- Novosibirsk State Conservatory named after M.I. Glinka (1956)
- Novosibirsk Higher Military Command School of the Ministry of Defence of the Russian Federation (1967)
- Novosibirsk Military Institute named after I.K. Yakovlev of the National Guard Forces Command of the Russian Federation (1971)
- Novosibirsk Institute of the Federal Security Service of the Russian Federation (1935)
- Siberian State Transport University (1932)
- Siberian State University of Water Transport (1951)
- Siberian State University of Geosystems and Technologies (1933)
- Siberian State University of Telecommunications and Information Sciences (1953)
- Siberian Institute of Management of the Russian Presidential Academy of National Economy and Public Administration (1991)
- Siberian Institute of International Relations and Regional Studies (1998)
- Siberian University of Consumer Cooperation (1956)
- Siberian Academy of Finance and Banking (1992)

=== Obninsk ===
- Obninsk State Technical University for Nuclear Power Engineering (1953), successor of Obninsk Institute for Nuclear Power Engineering

=== Omsk ===
- Omsk Academy of Law
- Omsk State Medical University
- Omsk Regional College of Culture and Arts
- Omsk Regional Museum of The Fine Arts
- Omsk Road-Transport Academy
- Omsk State Agrarian University (1918) (connected with Omsk State Veterinary Institute and Institute of Agribusiness and Continuing Education)
- Omsk State Pedagogical University
- Omsk State Technical University (1942)
- Omsk State Transport University (1961)
- Omsk State University (1974)
- Omsk Institute of Consumer Service Technology
- Siberian Academy of Physical Culture
- Omsk Foreign Language Institute

=== Oryol ===
- Oryol State Agrarian University
- Oryol State Technical University (merged with Oryol State University)
- Oryol State University
- Oryol State Institute of Culture
- Oryol Law Institute
- Oryol State University of Economics and Business
- Russian Federation Security Guard Service Federal Academy

=== Orenburg ===
- Orenburg Institute of Moscow State Law Academy
- Orenburg State Institute of Management (OSIM) (1991)
- Orenburg State Pedagogical University
- Orenburg State University (1955)
- Orenburg State Medical University

=== Penza ===
- Penza Institute of Technology – Branch of Penza State University
- Penza State Technological University
- Penza State University
- Penza State University of Architecture and Construction
- Penza Artillery Engineering Institute
- Penza State Technological Academy
- Penza State Agricultural Academy
- Penza State Pedagogical University (unified with Penza State University in 2012)

=== Pereslavl-Zalessky ===
- University of Pereslavl

=== Perm ===
- Perm branch of Higher School of Economics
- Perm State Agricultural Academy
- Perm State Institute of Culture
- Perm State Medical Academy
- Perm State Pharmaceutical Academy
- Perm State Teachers' Training University (1919)
- Perm State Technical University
- Perm State University (1916)

=== Petrozavodsk ===
- Petrozavodsk State University
- Petrazavodsk Glazunov State Conservatoire

=== Petropavlovsk-Kamchatsky ===
- Kamchatka State University
- Kamchatka State Technical University

=== Pskov ===
- Pskov State University
- Pskov State Pedagogical University

=== Pyatigorsk ===
- North-Caucasus Federal University
- Pyatigorsk State Linguistic University

=== Rostov on Don ===
- Don State Technical University
- Rostov State Academy of Architecture and Art
- Rostov State University of Economics
- Rostov State Medical University RostSMU
- Rostov State Transport University
- Rostov State University (1915), successor to the Warsaw Russian University (founded 1869)
- Rostov State University of Communication
- Southern Federal University (1915)

=== Rybinsk ===
- Rybinsk State Solovyev Aviation technology University

=== Ryazan ===
- Ryazan State University
- Ryazan State Agricultural University
- Ryazan State Pavlov Medical University
- Ryazan State Radio Engineering University

=== St Petersburg ===
- Admiral Makarov State Maritime Academy, St.Petersburg
- Baltic Institute of Economics and Finance
- Baltic State Technical University
- European University at St Petersburg (ЕУСПб, 1994)
- Hertzen Russian State Pedagogical University
- Lesgaft National State University of Physical Education, Sport and Health
- Military engineering-technical university, St-Petersburg (1810)
- Pavlov St. Petersburg State Medical University
- Petersburg State University of Communication
- Prof. Bonch-Bruevich St. Petersburg State University of Telecommunications
- Pushkin Leningrad State University
- Saint Petersburg Institute of Trade and Economics
- Saint Petersburg National Research University of Information Technologies, Mechanics and Optics, ITMO University (1900)
- Saint Petersburg State Academy of Chemistry and Pharmacology
- Saint Petersburg State Agrarian University (1904)
- Saint Petersburg State Conservatory (1862)
- Saint Petersburg State Electrotechnical University (1886)
- Saint Petersburg State Institute of Psychology and Social Work (1992)
- Saint Petersburg State Medical Academy (1907)
- Saint Petersburg State Medical University (1897)
- Saint Petersburg State Pediatric Medical University (1925)
- Saint Petersburg State Polytechnical University (1899)
- Saint Petersburg State Technological Institute (1828)
- Saint Petersburg State University (1819) (successor to Saint Petersburg Academy, founded 1724)
- Saint Petersburg State University of Aerospace Instrumentation
- Saint-Petersburg State University of Architecture and Civil Engineering
- Saint Petersburg State University of Civil Aviation (founded in 1955, academy until 01.12.2004)
- Saint-Petersburg State University of Culture and Arts
- Saint Petersburg State University of Economics (2012)
- Saint Petersburg State University of Engineering and Economics
- Saint Petersburg State University of Refrigeration and Food Engineering (merged with Saint Petersburg National Research University of Information Technologies, Mechanics and Optics since 2012)
- Saint Petersburg State University of Sea and Technology
- Saint Petersburg State University of Water Communications (1809)
- Smolny College
- Smolny University
- St. Petersburg Institute of Jewish Studies

=== Samara ===
- Samara University
- Samara State Technical University
- Samara State Medical University
- Samara State University of Teacher Training
- Samara State University of Economics
- Samara State University of communications
- Samara State Institute of Culture
- Samara State Agricultural Academy

=== Saransk ===
- Mordovian State University
- Mordovian State Pedagogical Institute
- Mordovian Institute of Humanities

=== Saratov ===
- Saratov State Agrarian University
- Saratov Regional College of Art
- Saratov State Academy of Law
- Saratov State Medical University
- Saratov State Technical University
- Saratov State University (1909)
- Saratov Conservatory

=== Seversk ===
- Seversk State Technological Academy

=== Smolensk ===
- Smolensk Humanitarian University
- Smolensk State University
- Smolensk State Medical University
- Smolensk State Agricultural Academy
- Smolensk State Academy of Physical Culture Sport and Tourism
- Smolensk State Institute of Art
- Vasilevsky Military Academy of the Air Defence Forces

=== Sochi ===
- Sochi State University
- Russian International Olympic University
- Federal Ecological University
- Sochi Institute of Fashion, Business and Law
- International University of Innovation

=== Stavropol ===
- Stavropol State Agrarian University
- North-Caucasus Federal University
- Stavropol State Medical University

=== Syktyvkar ===
- Syktyvkar State University

=== Taganrog ===
- Taganrog State Pedagogical Institute
- Taganrog State University of Radioengineering

=== Tambov ===
- Tambov State Technical University
- Tambov State University

=== Tolyatti ===
- Togliatti State University
- Tatyshev Volga University

=== Tomsk ===
- Tomsk Polytechnic University (1896)
- Tomsk State Pedagogical University (1902)
- Tomsk State University (1878)
- Tomsk State University of Architecture and Building (1952)
- Tomsk State University of Control Systems and Radioelectronics (1962)
- Siberian State Medical University

=== Tula ===
- Tolstoy Tula State Pedagogical University
- Tula State University

=== Tver ===
- Tver State Medical Academy
- Tver State University
- Tver State Technical University

=== Tyumen ===
- Tyumen State Oil and Gas University
- Tyumen State Agricultural Academy
- Tyumen State Medical University
- Tyumen State University
- School of Advanced Studies

=== Ufa ===
- Bashkir State University (1957)
- Bashkir State Agrarian University
- Ufa State Petroleum Technological University
- Ufa State Aviation Technical University
- Ufa University of Science and Technology

=== Ukhta ===
- Ukhta State Technical University

=== Ulan Ude ===
- Buryat State Agricultural Academy
- Buryat State University

=== Ulyanovsk ===
- Ulyanovsk State Agricultural Academy
- Ulyanovsk State Pedagogical University
- Ulyanovsk State Technical University
- Ulyanovsk State University

=== Vladikavkaz ===
- Highlanders State Agrarian University
- North Caucasus University of Mining and Metallurgy
- North Ossetian State University
- North Ossetian State Medical Academy

=== Vladimir ===
- Vladimir State Humanitarian University
- Vladimir State University

=== Vladivostok ===
- Far Eastern Federal University (1956), successor of Oriental Institute in Vladivostok
- Far Eastern State Academy of Economics and Management
- Far Eastern State Technical Fishing University
- Far Eastern State Technical University
- Far Eastern State University of Communication
- Vladivostok State University of Economics and Service (1967)
- Vladivostok State Medical University

=== Volgograd ===
- Volgograd State Academy of Architecture and Construction
- Volgograd State Conservatory
- Volgograd State Medical University
- Volgograd State Pedagogical University
- Volgograd State Technical University
- Volgograd State University

=== Vologda ===
- Vologda State University

=== Voronezh ===
- Glinka Voronezh State Agricultural University
- Voronezh Economics and Law Institute
- Voronezh State Academy of Forestry Engineering
- Voronezh State Academy of Technology
- Voronezh State Agricultural University
- Voronezh State Medical Academy
- Voronezh State Pedagogical University
- Voronezh State Technical University
- Voronezh State University (1918), successor to the Imperial University of Dorpat (founded 1802 or 1632)
- Zhukovsky – Gagarin Air Force Academy

=== Yakutsk ===
- Yakutsk State University (1956)

=== Yaroslavl ===
- Yaroslavl Demidov State University (1918), successor to the Demidov Lyceum (founded 1803)
- Yaroslavl State Pedogogical University
- Yaroslavl State Technical University

=== Yekaterinburg ===
- Ural Federal University
- Ural State Academy of Communications
- Ural State Academy of Mining and Geology
- Ural State University of Economics
- Ural State Forestry Engineering Academy
- Ural State Law Academy
- Ural State Pedagogical University
- Ural State University of Railway Transport (1956)
- Ural State Academy of Architecture and Arts
- Urals State Academy of Law
- Ural State Mining University
- Ural State Medical University

=== Yelets ===
- Bunin Yelets State University

=== Yoshkar-Ola ===
- Mari State University
- Mari State Technical University
- Volga State University of Technology

=== Yuzhno-Sakhalinsk ===
- Sakhalin State University

== Crimea ==
- Sevastopol National University of Nuclear Energy and Industry
- Sevastopol State University of Humanities
- Sevastopol National Technical University
- V.I. Vernadsky Crimean Federal University
- Crimean Archaeological University
- Crimean Somokin School of Art
- Medical Academy named after S.I. Georgievsky of Vernadsky CFU
- Crimean Engineering and Pedagogical Institute
- National Academy of Tourism
- Taurida seminary

== Others ==
- Eastern Institute of Economics, Humanitarian Sciences, Management, and Law
- Eastern Siberian State Technological University
- Essentuky Institute of Management, Business, and Law
- Gorky Literature Institute
- Karelsky State Pedagogical University
- Lomonosov Pomorsky State University
- Military – Technical University of the Federal Service of Specialized Construction of Russian Federation
- Missile Forces Military Academy named after Peter the Great
- Northern International University
- Northwestern Academy of Public Service
- Polzunov Altay State Technical University
- Pomor State University
- Puschino State University
- REF (International Name) Institution of Elite Training, attached to the Government of RF
- Rubtzovsk Industrial Institute
- Sergo Ordzhonikidze State University of Management
- Seversk State Technological Academy
- Shahty Institute, branch of South Russian State Technical University
- Siberian Academy for Public Administration
- Siberian Federal University
- Siberian Metallurgic Institute
- Siberian State Academy of Geodesy
- Siberian State Academy of Motorcars and Roads
- Siberian State Aerospace University (Russian abbreviation is SibGAU) (1960)
- Siberian State Industrial University
- Siberian State Medical University (1888)
- Siberian State Technological University (Russian abbreviation is SibGTU), the oldest in the city, founded in 1930 as the Siberian Institute of Forest
- Siberian State University of Communication
- Siberian State University of Telecommunication and Information Sciences
- Siberian Transport University (1932)
- Siberian University of Small Business
- South Russian State Technical University
- Voenmeh Baltic State Technical University
- Vyatka State University of Humanities
- Zabaykalsky State Pedagogical University

== Higher education in Siberia ==
- Abakan State Institute of Education
- Abakan State University of Pedagogy
- Amur State University
- Bratsk State Technical University
- Buryat State Agricultural Academy
- Chita State Technical University
- Chita State University of Medicine
- Chita State University of Polytechnics
- Eastern Institute of Economics, Humanitarian Sciences, Management, and Law
- Eastern Siberian State Technological University
- Far Eastern Federal University (1899)
- Irkutsk Institute of Railway Engineering
- Irkutsk State Academy of Agriculture (Irkutsk Institute of Agriculture)
- Irkutsk State Academy of Economics
- Irkutsk State Linguistic University (1948)
- Irkutsk State University (1918)
- Kemerovo Agricultural Institute
- Kemerovo Art Academy
- Kemerovo Medical Academy
- Kemerovo State University (1973)
- Kemerovo Technological Institute of Food Industry
- Khakass Technical Institute
- Krasnoyarsk State Institute of Trade and Economics
- Krasnoyarsk State Medical Academy (Russian abbreviation is KrasGMA) (1942)
- Krasnoyarsk State Pedagogical University (Russian abbreviation is KGPU) (1932)
- Krasnoyarsk State Technical University (Russian abbreviation is KGTU) (1956)
- Krasnoyarsk State University (Russian abbreviation is KGU) (1963) (started as a division of Novosibirsk State University, became a standalone university in 1969)
- Kuzbass State Pedagogical Academy
- Kuzbass State Technical University
- Kuzbass State University
- Novosibirsk State Agricultural University
- Novosibirsk State Technical University (1950)
- Novosibirsk State University (1959)
- Omsk Academy of Law
- Omsk Medical Academy
- Omsk Road-Transport Academy
- Omsk State Agrarian University (1918) (connected with Omsk State Veterinary Institute and Institute of Agribusiness and Continuing Education)
- Omsk State Pedagogical University
- Omsk State Technical University (1942)
- Omsk State Transport University (1961)
- Omsk State University (1974)
- Omsk University of Consumer Service Technology
- Omsk University of Physical Culture
- Pacific National University, former Khabarovsk State Technical University (founded 1958)
- Siberian Academy for Public Administration
- Siberian State Academy of Motorcars and Roads
- Siberian State Aerospace University (Russian abbreviation is SibGAU) (1960)
- Siberian State Industrial University
- Siberian State Medical University (1888)
- Siberian State Technological University (Russian abbreviation is SibGTU), the oldest in the city, founded in 1930 as the Siberian Institute of Forest
- Siberian State University of Communication
- Siberian State University of Telecommunication and Information Sciences
- Siberian University of Small Business
- South Ural State University (1943)
- Sukachev Institute of Forest (1944)
- Tomsk Polytechnic University (1896)
- Tomsk State Pedagogical University (1902)
- Tomsk State University (1878), the first university in Siberia
- Tomsk State University of Architecture and Building (1952)
- Tomsk State University of Control Systems and Radioelectronics (1962)
- Tuvan Institute of Humanitarian Research
- Tuvan State University
- Tyumen State Oil and Gas University
- Vladivostok State University of Economics and Service (1967)
- Yakutsk State University (1956)

== See also ==
- Education in Russia#Tertiary (university level) education
- Education in the Soviet Union (Historical)
- Open access in Russia
- List of institutions of higher education in Siberia
