= Seversk State Technological Academy =

Technical university in Seversk, Russia

Coordinates: 56.604°N 84.891°E

Seversk State Technological Academy (Russian: Северская государственная технологическая академия) is a post-secondary educational institution in the City of Seversk, Tomsk Oblast, Russia. The school has 1,150 students, of whom 500 study full-time and 75 professors. The rector is Aleksandr Nikolaevich Zhiganov.

== History ==
The school was founded in 1959 as a branch of the Physics-Technological faculty of Tomsk Polytechnic University. From 1996 to 2001, the school was known as the Seversk Technological Institute of Tomsk Polytechnic University. Later, it became an independent institution called the Seversk State Technological Institute and in 2005, adopted its current name.

== Academics ==
The school has four main faculties:

- Management Technology
- Electrical Engineering and Automation
- Technological Faculty
- Continuing Education

== Foreign relations ==
The school has partnered with a number of foreign universities including University of Dortmund and University of Karlsruhe in Germany, Open University in the United Kingdom, Boston University and Massachusetts Institute of Technology, United States and Politecnico di Milano in Italy.

== See also ==
- List of institutions of higher learning in Russia
- Education in Siberia
