= Siberian State Industrial University =

Technical university in Novokuznetsk, Russia

- Сибирский государственный индустриальный университет
- Established: 1930
- Rector: Alexey Yuriev
- Academic staff: 1,051 lecturers and teachers
- Students: 15,000
- Location: Novokuznetsk, Russia; 53°45′0″N 87°7′0″E
- Website: http://www.sibsiu.ru Building details
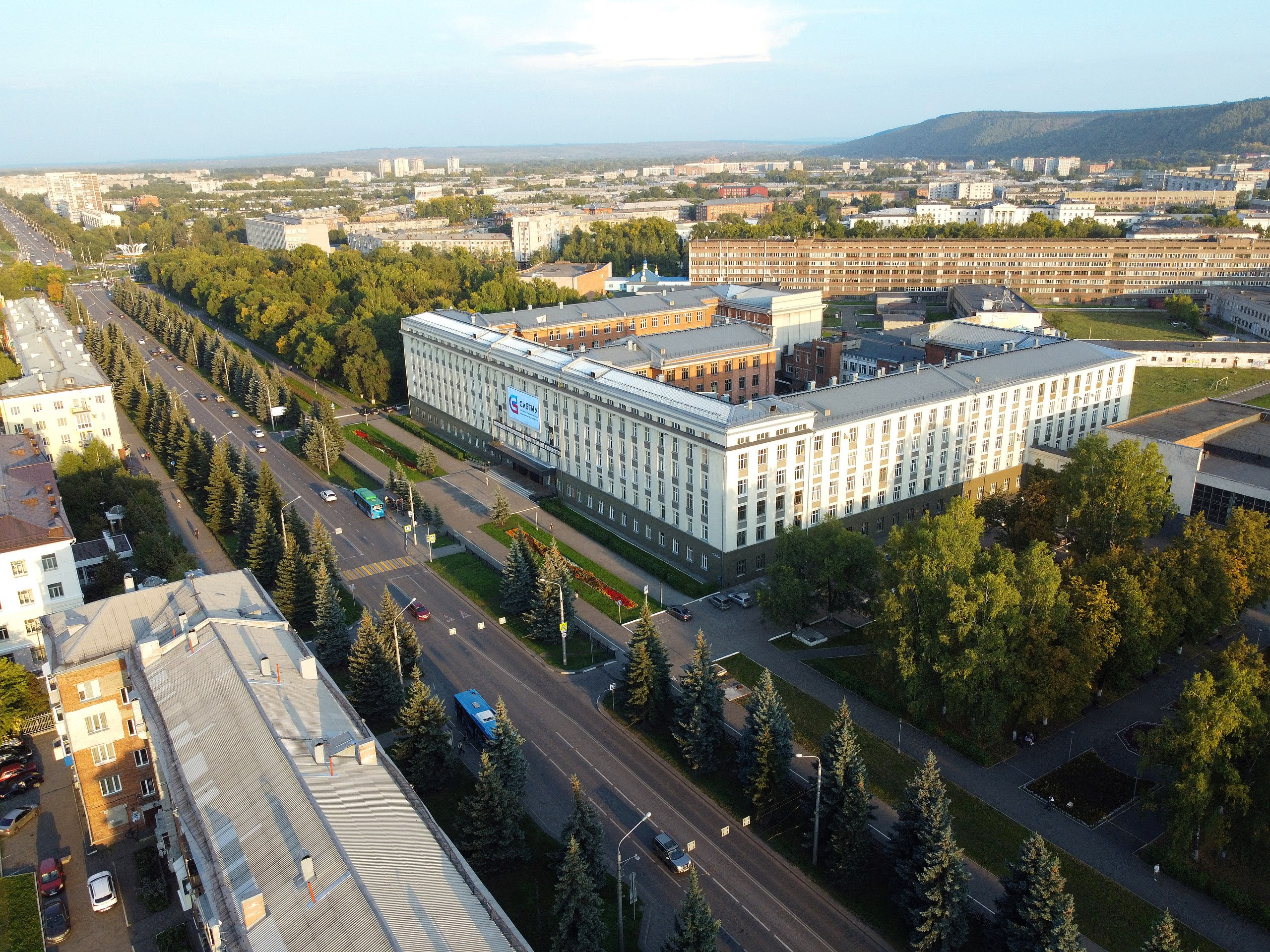

Siberian State Industrial University (Russian: Сибирский государственный индустриальный университет, abbreviated СибГИУ) is the oldest university in Novokuznetsk, Russia. It was established on June 23, 1930, to train professional personnel for the construction of the Kuznetsk Metallurgical Combine (Novokuznetsk Iron and Steel Plant). Prior to raising the status in 1994, it was named the Siberian Metallurgic Institute (SMI), then it was renamed the Siberian State Mining-Metallurgic Academy (SibGGMA). In 1998, the status of the university had risen to the level of the Technical University and it received the title of Siberian State Industrial University (SibSIU). The university is located in the central district of Novokuznetsk.

Siberian State Industrial University has about 15,000 undergraduate, graduate, and doctoral students, and a faculty of about 1200, including 326 professors and 350 associate professors.

== Famous Alumni ==
Vladimir Lisin - a Russian steel tycoon, graduated with MSc in Metal Engineering in 1979.

== See also ==
- Education in Siberia
- List of institutions of higher learning in Russia
