= Penza State Technological University =

- Пензенский государственный технологический университет
- Type: Public
- Established: 30 December 1959
- Location: Penza, Russia; 53°13′26″N 45°00′02″E
- Campus: Urban
- Nickname: PenzGTU (Russian: ПензГТУ)
- Website: www.penzgtu.ru

Penza State Technological University (Russian: Пензенский государственный технологический университет) is a higher education institution in Penza, Penza Oblast, Russia.

== History ==
The Penza Plant-University is considered to have been founded on December 30, 1959. The educational institution was opened at the Computing and Analytical Machines Plant on the initiative of the then rector of the Penza Polytechnic Institute, V. I. Artyukhin, and the director of the CAM Plant, B. A. Matkin. In 1994, the Plant-University was transformed into the Penza Technological Institute, in 2004, the Penza State Technological Academy was established, and in 2013, the Penza State Technological University (PenzSTU) was created..

In 2016, a criminal case was opened against Vasily Moiseyev, the acting rector of Penza Technological University, for abuse of office. Investigators believe the university's rector devised a scheme through which students purchased completed theses and coursework from professors. For a fee, they could also be exempt from writing tests, regardless of their level of knowledge. The proceeds were distributed between the rector and the university's professors in the form of bonuses. The professors, in turn, sold theses written by other students in previous years. During a search of Moiseyev's apartment, 7 million rubles, $60,000, 35,000 euros, and precious metals, including at least 60 kilograms of silver jewelry, were seized.
