= Minin Nizhny Novgorod State Pedagogical University =

University in Nizhny Novgorod, Russian

- Нижегородский государственный педагогический университет имени Козьмы Минина
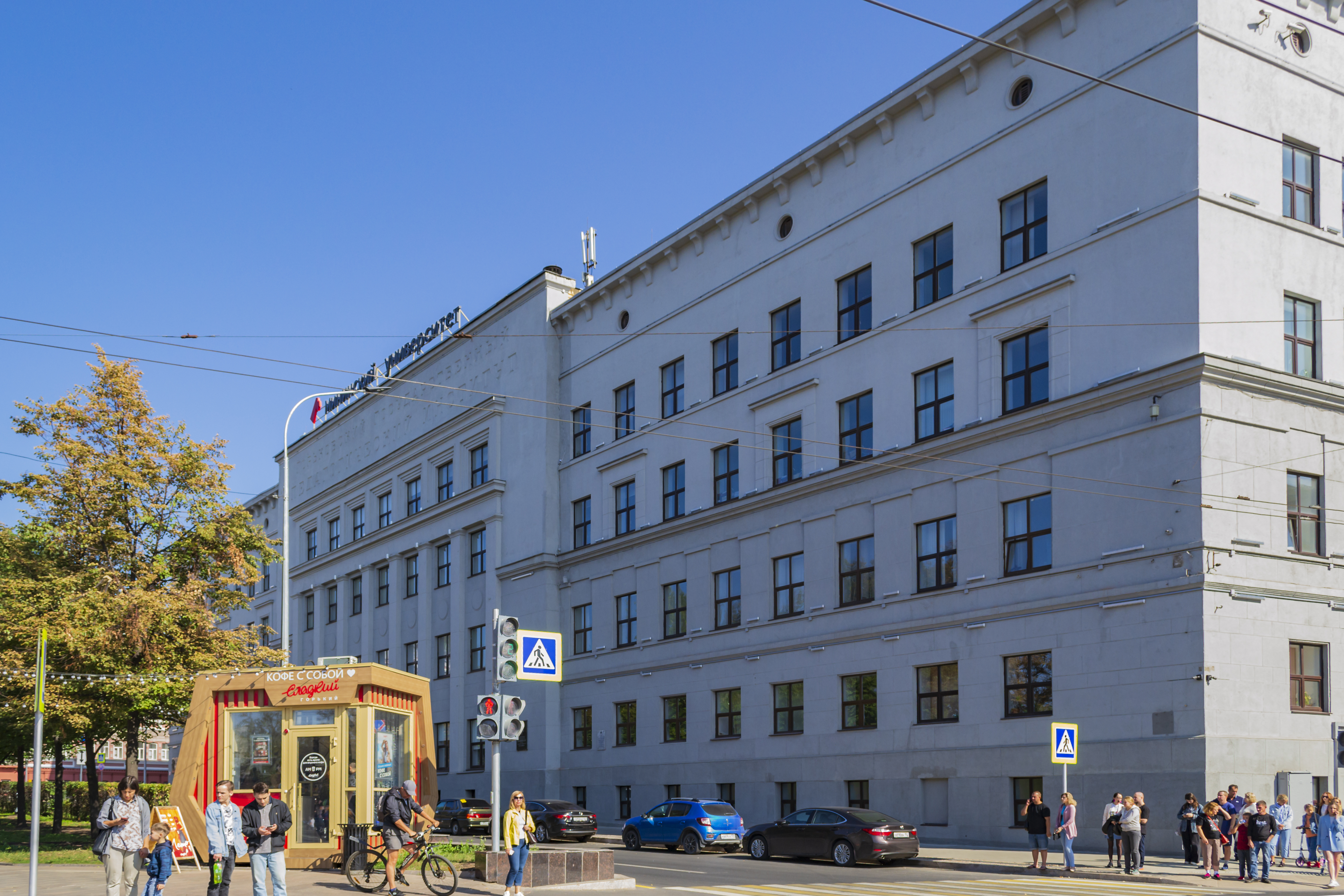
- Established: 1911 (current form 2011)
- Rector: Viktor Sdobnyakov
- Location: Nizhny Novgorod, Russia; 56°19′34″N 44°00′27″E
- Website: mininuniver.ru

Kuzma Minin Nizhny Novgorod State Pedagogical University (Russian: Нижегородский государственный педагогический университет имени Козьмы Минина) is a Russian pedagogical higher education institution located in Nizhny Novgorod.

The university was founded in 1911 as the Nizhny Novgorod Teachers' Institute. Exactly one hundred years later, in 2011, it was merged with the Volga State Engineering and Pedagogical University. Today, it comprises 11 faculties, 31 departments, 13 research laboratories and centers, a research institute of applied psychology, a regional scientific and educational center, a Technopark for universal pedagogical competencies, and a "Quantorium" (a specialized center for youth innovation and technical creativity).

== History ==
=== Nizhny Novgorod Pedagogical Institute (1921–1926) ===
In the autumn of 1921, by order of the People's Commissariat for Education (Narkompros), the Nizhny Novgorod Institute of Public Education was reorganized into a pedagogical institute, with agricultural economist D. G. Lurie appointed as its rector. On September 15, 1921, the institute moved into the building of the former Nizhny Novgorod Gubernia Gymnasium—a site it occupies to this day. It inherited the gymnasium's classroom equipment and an extensive library, one of the richest in the city. During the 1921–1922 academic year, the curriculum was organized into four thematic cycles: socio-historical, physico-chemical, natural science, and natural geography. In the 1923–1924 academic year, the institute comprised five departments: physico-technical, natural-agronomic, socio-economic, political-educational, and school-education. In the 1924–1925 academic year, the latter was replaced by a linguistics department, which included a section for the Russian language. The student body grew steadily each year, reaching 425 students by the 1922–1923 academic year.

=== Pedagogical Faculty of Nizhny Novgorod University (1926–1930) ===
In 1926, the pedagogical institute was incorporated into Nizhny Novgorod University as a faculty, consisting of five departments: physico-mathematical, chemical-biological, socio-historical, language and literature, and political-educational work. While effectively maintaining its autonomy, the institute remained part of the university until the spring of 1930, when Nizhny Novgorod University was dissolved. Nizhny Novgorod (Gorky) State Pedagogical Institute (1930–1993) Throughout the 1930s, the institute underwent expansion and restructuring. In August 1934, the departments were reorganized into five faculties: History; Language and Literature; Physics and Mathematics; Natural Sciences; and Pedagogy. That October, an autonomous two-year teachers' institute, consisting of three departments, was organized under the umbrella of the pedagogical institute. During the first half of the 1930s, the original gymnasium building was expanded: two additional stories were built atop the side wings (which were connected to the main structure), and one additional story was added to the main building itself. This significantly increased the available classroom space. In the autumn of 1932, local authorities named the institution after Maxim Gorky, and it became known as the Maxim Gorky Pedagogical Institute of Gorky.

By the onset of the Great Patriotic War, 1,350 students were enrolled in the institute's full-time program. During the war, the institute was relocated to the building of the Agricultural Institute—a site that had housed a theological seminary before the Revolution and now serves as the second building of the Nizhny Novgorod State Pedagogical University. Over the course of the war, 287 individuals from the institute—including 243 students—left to join the ranks of the Soviet Army. Fifty-nine people volunteered, 40 of whom were women. By the 1944–1945 academic year, the number of students at the institute had returned to pre-war levels. Throughout the war, the institute remained operational: new courses were developed and taught, several specialized study rooms were opened, new students were regularly admitted, and scholarships were paid out on schedule. Academic departments continued their research, strengthening ties with the industrial sector—including the defense industry.

Following the war, the headquarters of the Moscow Military District and a hospital—which had been housed in the building of the former Nizhny Novgorod Gymnasium—vacated the premises. The building underwent major renovations, and its laboratories and study rooms were restored. In the 1945/1946 academic year, classes were held in the following faculties: Language and Literature, History, Biology, Geography, Physics and Mathematics, and Pedagogy (which included departments for preschool and school-age education). In 1947, a Faculty of Physical Education and Sports—with a four-year curriculum—was added. In 1949, a department of Logic, Psychology, and the Russian Language was established within the Faculty of Russian Language and Literature. That same year (1947), a second teaching specialization was introduced across all faculties (with the exception of the Pedagogy and Physical Education faculties), extending the duration of study to five years.

=== Kozma Minin Nizhny Novgorod State Pedagogical University ===
During this period, the institute was nominated for the Order of the Red Banner of Labor. In 1993, it was reorganized into a university and renamed "Nizhny Novgorod State Pedagogical University."

In accordance with an order of the Minister of Education and Science of the Russian Federation (No. 1466, dated April 7, 2011), the Nizhny Novgorod State Pedagogical University and the Volga State Engineering-Pedagogical University were reorganized through a merger. The merged higher education institution was named "Minin University", or "Kozma Minin Nizhny Novgorod State Pedagogical University".

In 2021, a "Technopark for Universal Pedagogical Competencies" and a "Quantorium" pedagogical technopark were established. Four new faculties were created: the Faculty of Information Technology, the Faculty of Linguistics, the Faculty of Physics and Technology, and the Faculty of Psychology. In 2024, under the leadership of rector Viktor Sdobnyakov, Minin University joined the "Priority 2030" strategic academic leadership program as a candidate, with a concept focused on transforming natural science education in schools. In 2025, with the support of the governor of the Nizhny Novgorod Oblast, G. S. Nikitin, Minin University ranked among the top three leading candidate universities.

In 2024, the Nizhny Novgorod regional branch of the Russian-Chinese Friendship Society was established at Minin University, with Rector Viktor Sdobnyakov appointed as its head.
