= Kazan State Power Engineering University =

Coordinates: 55°49′00″N 49°05′44″E

- Казанский государственный энергетический университет
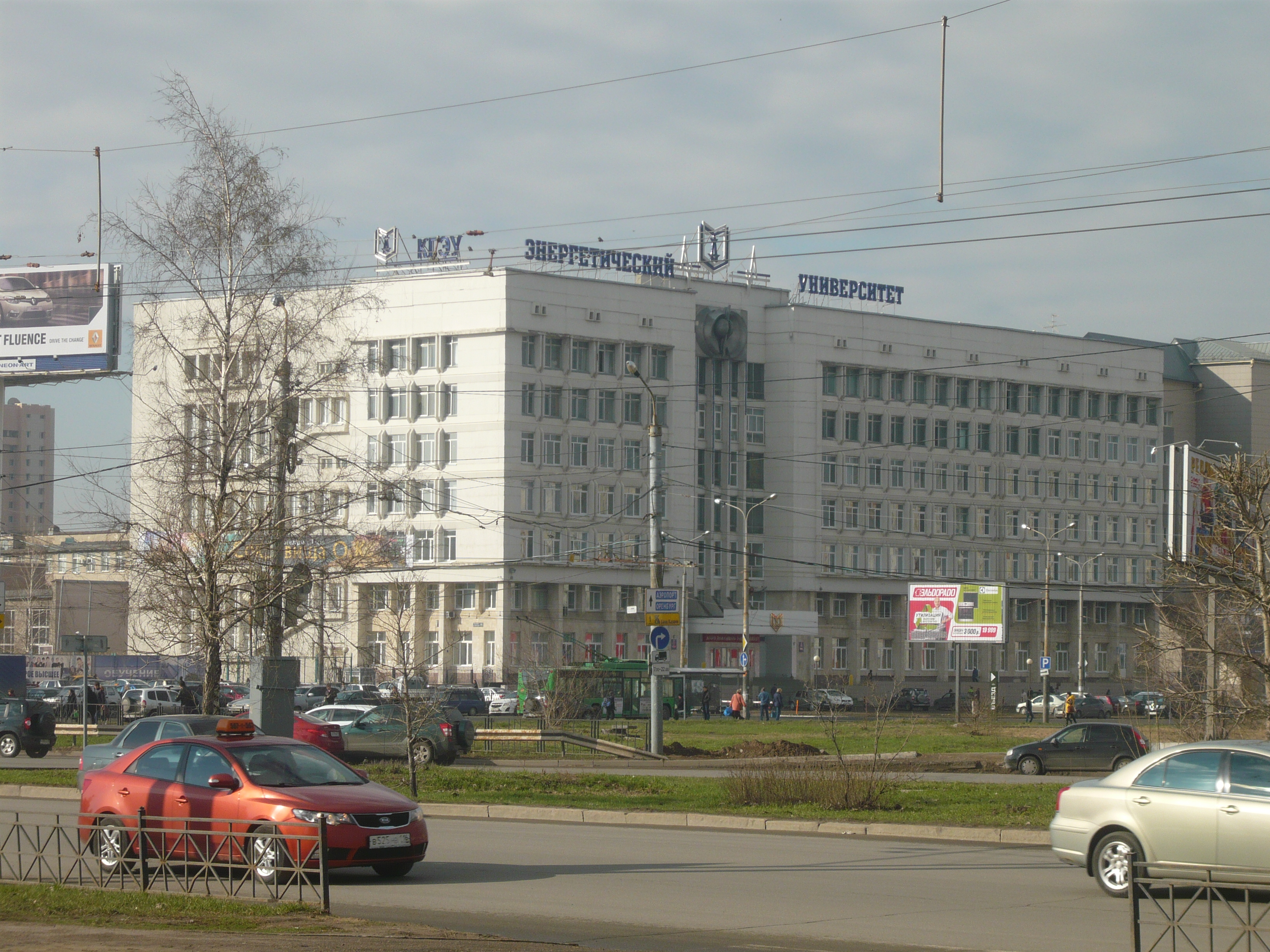
- Former names: Kazan branch of the Moscow Power Engineering Institute, Kazan Power Engineering Institute, Kazan State Power Engineering Institute
- Type: public
- Established: 1968
- Rector: Edvard Abdullazyanov
- Students: 12'000
- Location: 51 Krasnosel'skaya, Kazan, Tatarstan, Russia
- Website: kgeu.ru

University rankings

Regional – Overall
- QS Emerging Europe and Central Asia: 401-450 (2022)

The Kazan State Power Engineering University (KSPEU; Russian: Казанский государственный энергетический университет, КГЭУ; Tatar: Казан дәүләт энергетика университеты) is a public instite in Kazan, Tatarstan, Russia. It trains specialists in the power engineering and is one of three such universities in Russia.

== History ==
In 1930, the Kazan Power Engineering Institute trained power engineers was opened in Kazan. However, it was closed in 1933.

In the 1960s, there was a shortage of power energy specialists. And then, on July 18, 1968, the Kazan branch of the Moscow Power Engineering Institute (KB MPEI) was opened. The first years, education took place in the premises of the Tatteploenergostroy dormitory. In September 1968, the construction of the first two buildings for the KB MPEI began. The first building was built by the end of 1970, the second one — in 1972. The Thermal Power Engineering and Electric Power Engineering faculties were officially organized.

Since 1992, the university has been switching to a level-based education system according with Bologna Process.

In 1994, the Faculty of Electronic Engineering and Automation was established. Since 1995, admission of students to graduate school has been started. Also the Faculty of Energy Supply and the Center of Pre-university training have been established. In 1997, the Faculty of Engineering and Economics and the Scientific Research Institute of Energy Problems was established at the Kazan branch of the MPEI.

In 1999, the Kazan branch of the MPEI was renamed the Kazan Power Engineering Institute (KPEI), and since September 14, 1999, it has been independent. On October 18, 2000, it achieved the status of a university and was renamed Kazan State Power Engineering University (KSPEU).

In 2001, a Small Energy College was opened at KSPEU. In 2002, the Department of Postgraduate Studies was transferred to the Department of Postgraduate and Doctoral Studies was opened; admission to the doctoral program has begun.

In 2003, the Institute of Thermal Power Engineering and the Faculty of Humanities were established. In 2013, the Faculty of Power Engineering was reorganized; the Institute of Economics and Social Technologies was renamed the Institute of Economics and Information Technology.

In April 2015, a multidisciplinary scientific and technical center Danfoss was opened on the territory of KSPEU.

== Education and science ==
Today, the university has 3 institutes (Institute of Thermal Power Engineering; Institute of Economics and Information Technology; Institute of Electric Power and Electronics) and 32 departments (chairs). Also, there is the Faculty of Distance Learning, the Faculty of Advanced Training of Teachers, and the Faculty of Additional Education.

Since 1993, the Department of International Affairs has been functioning in the KSPEU. Foreign students, postgraduates and trainees from other countries study at the university in various courses and specialties. The university also cooperates with foreign ones.

On the basis of the KSPEU, the Research Institute of Energy Problems operates. It designed to solve problems in the fields of heat and electricity, electrical engineering and electronics, environmental protection and rational use of resources of the Republic of Tatarstan, the Volga Region and the Western Urals.

In addition, the university cooperates with international companies for the production of energy equipment in the construction of training centers: Siemens, IBM, Danfoss and Schneider Electric, as well as with Russian energy companies: Tatenergo, Bashkirenergo, Udmurtenergo, Mordovenergo, Kirovenergo, and others.
