= Sochi State University =

- Сочинский государственный университет (Russian)
- Type: Public research
- Established: 1989
- Location: 94 Plastunskaya Street, Sochi, Russia; 43°34′59″N 39°43′59″E
- Campus: Urban
- Website: sutr.ru
- Building details
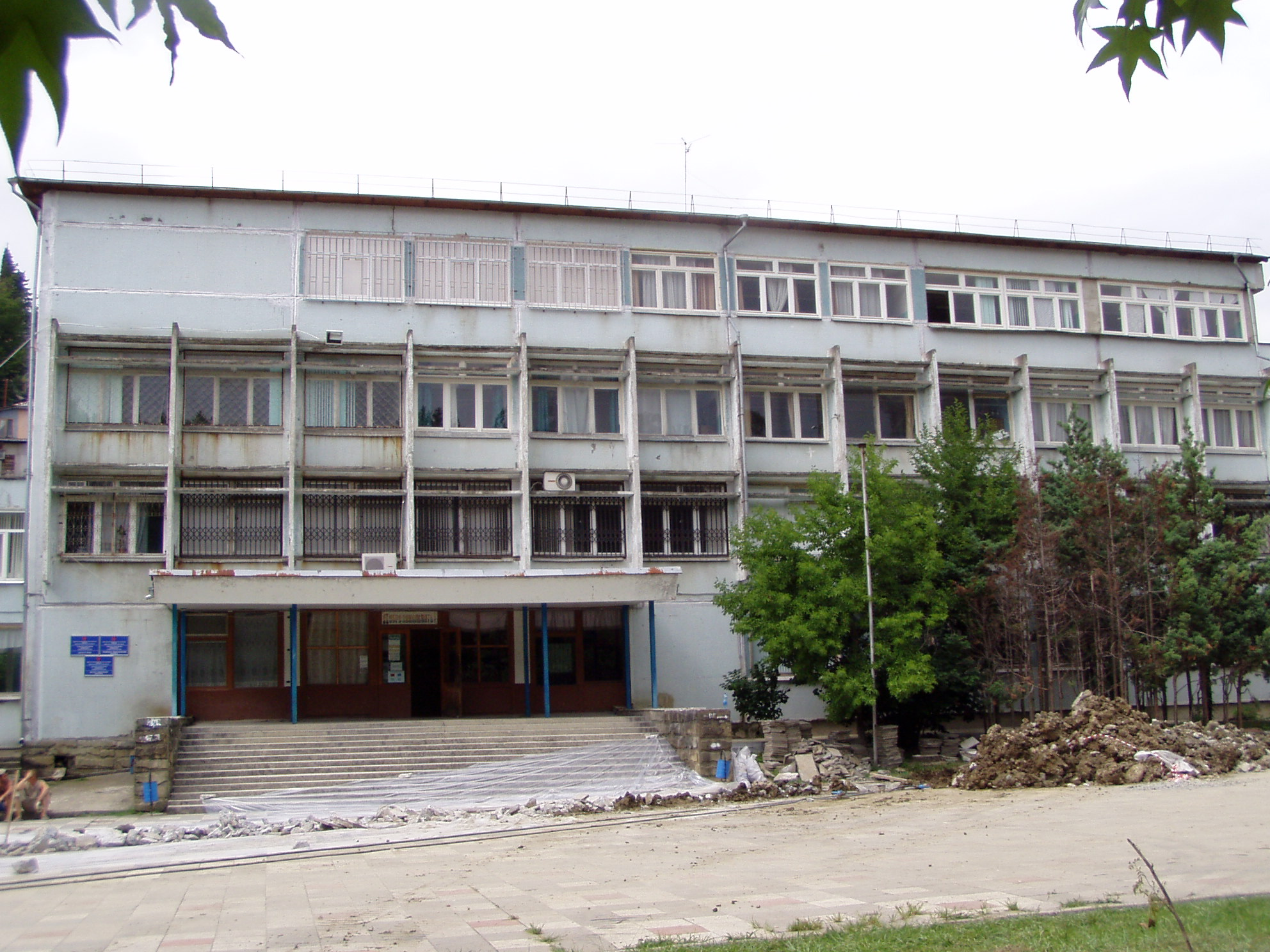

Sochi State University (Russian: Сочинский государственный университет) is a higher educational institution in the city of Sochi, Krasnodar Krai in southwest Russia. Located in buildings in the central district of the city. In April 2017, it became one of the regional core universities. As of 2018, the university has 5 faculties (tourism and service, economics and management processes, environmental engineering, socio-pedagogical, legal), University of Economics and Technology College. There are 22 departments, including 2 basic departments, 19 educational and scientific laboratories, a legal clinic, educational and training centers for students studying hotel and restaurant business - “Solar Wind” and “Atoll”, the Russian Language Center, etc. The total number About 7,000 people are enrolled in higher and secondary vocational education programs in all forms of training (taking into account the branch in Anapa), 4,000 of them are studying under the bachelor's programs.

== History ==
The University was founded in 1989 in accordance with the Decree of the Council of Ministers of the USSR dated March 29, 1988 No. 388 On the organization in Sochi of an educational and scientific center for the training, advanced training and retraining of workers and specialists in the field of resort business and tourism. In 1992, transformed into the Sochi State Institute of Resort and Tourism. In 1997, acquired the status of a university, and in 2011 became a classical university.

In 2010, the University Board of Trustees was created. In 2011, the Forward Volunteering Resource Center was created on the basis of SSU, which took a part in the training of personnel for the XXII Olympic Winter Games in Sochi. In 2015, the Center became one of the 15 volunteer centers in Russia that received the right to train volunteers for the 2018 FIFA World Cup. In total, the Center trained about 1350 volunteers.

Since 2015, the University has been supporting the activities of the Federal Educational and Methodological Association (FUMO) in the higher education system under the UGNS 43.00.00 “Service and Tourism” (Order of the Ministry of Education and Science of the Russian Federation of 09.09.2015 No. 987). In 2017, on the basis of SSU, a regional branch of the Russian professor's meeting was created.

In 2017–2018, the first regional educational platform in the south of Russia was created on the basis of SSU to train middle-level specialists and bachelors with WorldSkills Russia competencies. The Center for Early Career Guidance on “service” competencies according to WorldSkills Russia standards and the Specialized Regional Competence Center (CCC) for competence 34 “Cooking” (certificate No. 67-18 / 1801 of 06/04/2018) were created.

Since 2018, a bachelor's program in hotel business has been implemented in conjunction with the French business school Vatel with the issuance of double diplomas.
