= Bunin Yelets State University =

Education institution in Yelets, Russia

- Елецкий государственный университет имени И. А. Бунина
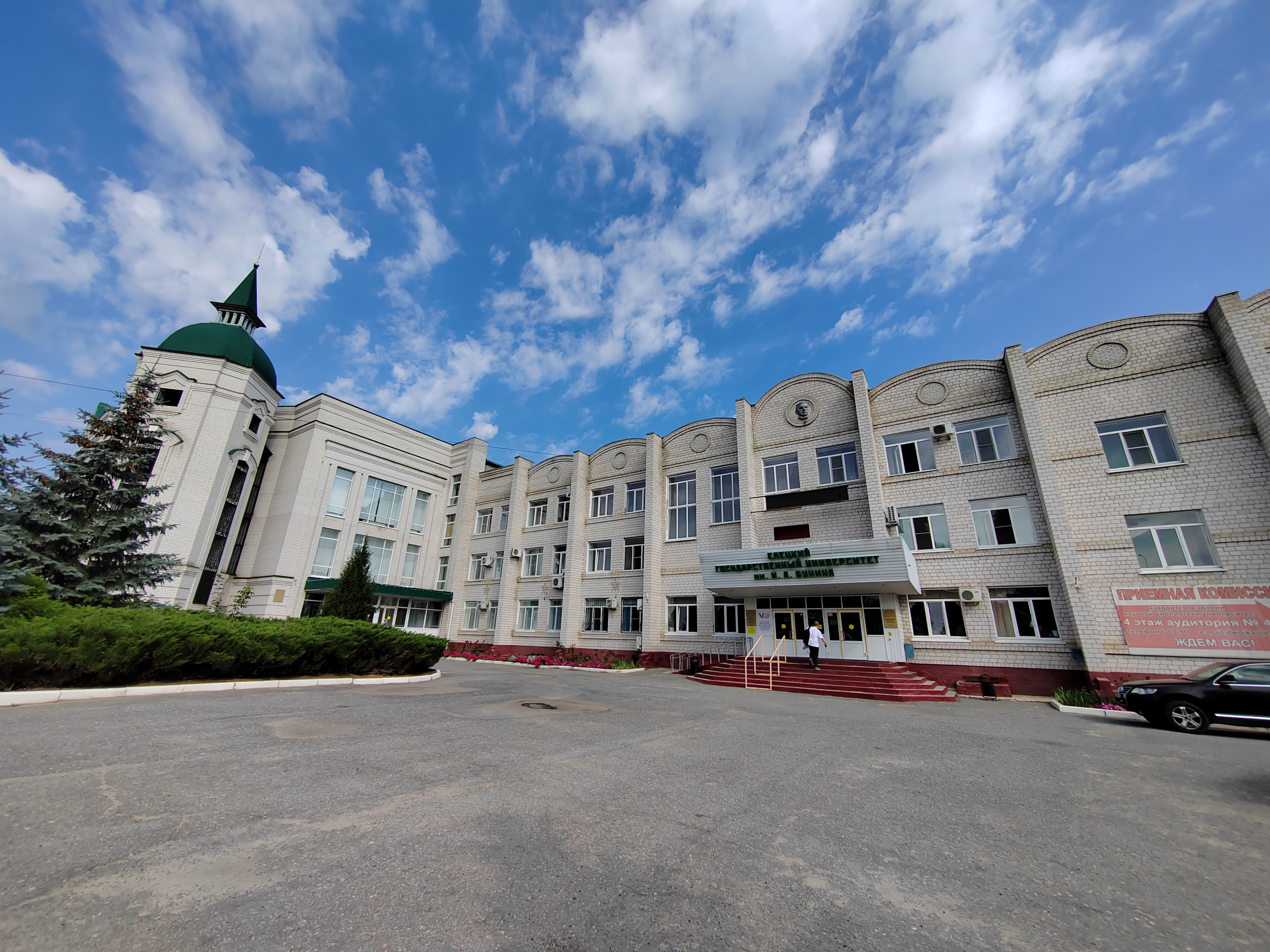
- Established: 1939
- Location: Yelets, Russia; 52.6265°N 38.4888°E
- Campus: Urban
- Website: http://www.elsu.ru/

Bunin Yelets State University (Russian: Елецкий государственный университет имени И. А. Бунина, lit. 'Yelets State University named after I. A. Bunin') is one of the higher educational institutions of Russia. It was founded in 1939 on the basis of the Yelets Faculty of Workers.

== History ==
On March 27, 1921, the Yelets Workers' Faculty was formed on the basis of the women's gymnasium opened in 1874.

In August 1939, by order of the People's Commissariat for Education of the RSFSR, the Yelets Working Faculty was transformed into the Yelets Teachers' Institute. The institute had three departments: history, philology, and physics and mathematics. In the first year of each of them there were 75 people. Candidate of Historical Sciences S. A. Komissarov became the director of the new institute.

In August 1952, by a Decree of the Council of Ministers of the USSR, the educational institution became known as the Yelets Pedagogical Institute.

Since 1959, new faculties were opened.

- 1959 — Faculty of Pedagogy and Methods of Primary Education
- 1963 — Faculty of Foreign Languages
- 1979 — Faculty of Pedagogy and Psychology (preschool)
- 1994 — Faculty of Law
- 1995 — Faculty of Economics
- 1996 — Faculty of History
- 1996 — Faculty of Music and Pedagogy
- 1998 — Faculty of Engineering and Physics
- 2000 — Faculty of Foreign Languages
- 2001 — Sports Department
- 2001 — Faculty of Social and Cultural Service and Tourism
- 2003 — Faculty of Design
- 2002 — Faculty of Agriculture
- 2007 — Faculty of Journalism (from 2003 to 2007 there was a department of journalism at the Faculty of Philology)
- 2010 — Faculty of Mechanics and Technology

In 1993, a postgraduate program was established at the institute, and in 1994, a dissertation council was formed. By order of the Ministry of Education of the Russian Federation No. 3226 dated November 10, 2000, the Yelets State Pedagogical Institute was renamed to Yelets State University named after I.A. Bunin, which on October 9, 2002, was entered into the Unified State Register of Legal Entities as the State Educational Institution of Higher Professional Education “Yelets State University named after. I. A. Bunin."

By order of the Ministry of Education and Science of the Russian Federation No. 1721 dated May 23, 2011, it was renamed the Federal State Budgetary Educational Institution of Higher Professional Education "Yelets State University named after I.A. Bunin."

By order of the Ministry of Education and Science of the Russian Federation No. 1417 dated December 3, 2015, it was renamed the Federal State Budgetary Educational Institution of Higher Education "Yelets State University named after I.A. Bunin."

== University structure ==
Until 2014, the structure of the university included 17 faculties, more than 40 departments, scientific laboratories, graduate school, doctoral studies, dissertation councils for defending doctoral and candidate dissertations, a free software center, a computer center, an electronic information center, a tourist information center, a student design center bureau, physical education and health complex, student educational and sports base, sanatorium, educational and experimental farm "Solidarity", business incubator "Oasis", library and reading rooms, hotels and dormitories, and a museum complex.Since 2014, changes have occurred in the structure of the university. As a result of the merger of faculties, 7 institutes were formed:

- Agro-Industrial Institute
- Institute of History and Culture
- Institute of Mathematics, Natural Sciences and Technology
- Institute of Law and Economics
- Institute of Psychology and Pedagogy
- Institute of Physical Culture, Sports and Life Safety
- Institute of Philology

The Center for Secondary Vocational Education also began to function. Within each institute there are departments that correspond in structure to the former faculties.

In 2021, the Faculty of Medicine began its work as a part of the university.
