= Tver State Medical Academy =

Tver State Medical University
- Тверская государственная медицинская Университет
- Type: Public
- Established: 1936
- Rector: Chichanovskaya Lesya Vasilievna
- Faculty: 470
- Undergraduates: 4000
- Postgraduates: 700
- Location: Tver, Russia; 56.8606°N 35.8996°E
- Nickname: TGMU
- Website: tvgmu.ru

Tver State Medical University (Russian: Тверской государственный медицинский Университет, Tverskoy gosudarstvennii medicinskiy Universitet, abbreviated TverSMU) is a research, scientific and educational center.

== History ==
The history of the Tver State Medical Academy opens up in 1902 when the courses for dental students were arranged. In 1936 the Leningrad Dental Institute was founded. In 1954 by the decision of the Soviet government the Institute was transferred from Leningrad to the city of Kalinin (now Tver). 1902 – Dental School was founded in St. Petersburg by I.A. Pashutin. 1919 – The Institute of Public Dentistry was founded and led by E.N. Anderson. 1936 – Leningrad State Dental Institute was founded. 1954 – Kalinin State Medical Institute was organized. 1994 – Tver State Medical Academy was formed. In 1994 after the renaming of Kalinin to Tver, the Institute was also renamed and got the status of the Academy.

== Tver State Medical University Today ==
Teaching hospital

The Medical Faculty is based mainly in the Regional Clinical Hospital and some its departments are affiliated to the city hospitals and maternity hospitals. The Pediatric faculty was opened in 1990. The Faculty trains pediatricians not only for Tver, but also for the other regions such as Tula, Bryansk, Pskov and Moscow. At the Faculty of postgraduate training physicians can receive specialization in obstetrics and gynecology, anesthesiology and reanimatology, ENT, ophthalmology, infections and tropical diseases, cardiology, gastroenterology, immunology and allergology, radiology and roentgenology, physiotheraphy, general surgery, oncology, psychiatry, traumatics and orthopedics, urology, pulmonology, dermatovenerology, neurology and neurosurgery, endocrinology, public health, oral and maxillofacial surgery, orthodontics, pedodontics, periodontics, oral pathology, oral medicine, prosthodontics, inplantantoology, operative dental surgery.

== International Cooperation ==
The international partners of the Academy are the Saarland University (Germany), Medical Academy of Lublin (Poland), Bicon (USA), DAAD (Germany), MASHAV of Israel, Russian Educational Centre (Sri Lanka) , RCIE & KGE (India).

TverSMA cricket team

The main directions of international cooperation are cardiology, genetics, pediatrics, gastroenterology, ophthalmology, radiology, surgery and public health. The Academy organizes international academic meetings, scientists and professors from Germany, UK, Canada, USA, Israel, India and other countries are invited to read lectures and to give practical training to the students. International students can study in Russian as well as in English Medium.
