= Irkutsk State Linguistic University =

Former public university in Irkutsk, Russia

- Иркутский государственный лингвистический университет
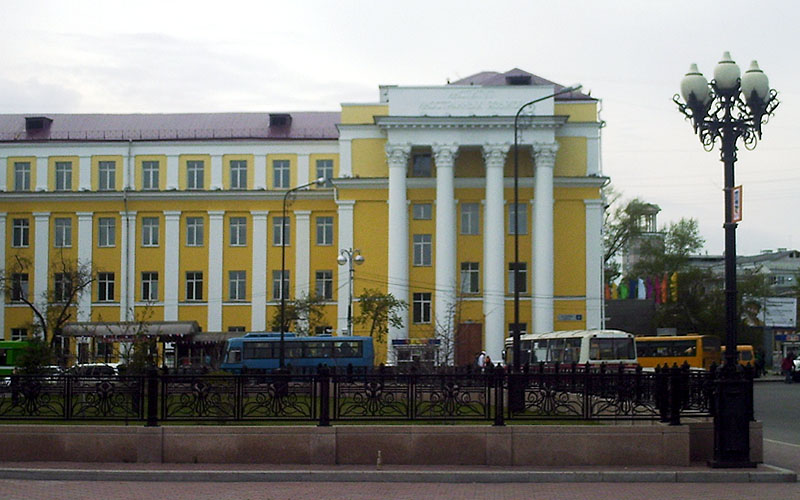
- Motto: Взаимопонимание со всем миром
- Established: 1948
- Rector: Г.Д. Воскобойник
- Academic staff: 10
- Students: 4200
- Location: Irkutsk, Russia; 52°17′19″N 104°16′43″E
- Website: http://www.islu.ru

Irkutsk State Linguistic University (Russian: Иркутский государственный лингвистический университет (ИГЛУ)) was a university in Irkutsk, Siberia in eastern Russia founded in 1948.

In 2016, it was integrated into Irkutsk State University as the newly created Institute of Philology, Foreign Languages and Media Communication. The university consists of two institutes (Institute of Cross-cultural Communication and Institute of Educational Technologies) and two independent faculties (Social Sciences Faculty and Education-by-Correspondence Faculty).

== Academics ==
The university gives linguistic education from secondary school to university to post-graduate and post-doctoral research programmes.

== License ==
A national license empowers the university to train professionals in 17 major areas at 10 faculties.

== Institutes ==
Institute of Cross-cultural Communication

Oriental Languages Faculty teaches:

- Linguistics and Cross-cultural Communication. The qualification granted is 'Linguist-translator of two foreign languages' (Chinese and English, Japanese and English, Korean and English).
- Foreign and home policy of China. The qualification granted is 'Regional studies specialist'.

Translation and Translatology Faculty

- Linguistics and Cross-cultural Communication. The qualification granted is 'Linguist-translator of two foreign languages' (European languages, such as English, French, German, Spanish, Italian).
- Foreign and home policy of the USA and Canada. The qualification granted is 'Regional studies specialist'.

International Faculty

- Linguistics. The Russian language.

Degrees:

- Bachelor (8-semester training)
- Master (4-semester training).

Institute of Educational Technologies

English Language Faculty

- Linguistics and Cross-cultural Communication. The qualification granted is 'Linguist-teacher of two foreign languages'
- Linguistics and Cross-cultural Communication. The qualification granted is 'Linguist-translator of two foreign languages'
- Personal and Public Security Service plus Modern English. The qualification granted is 'Teacher of Personal and Public Security Service. Teacher of English
- Linguistics and New Information Technologies. The qualification granted is 'Linguist'.
- Philological Education. The qualification granted is 'Bachelor of Philological Education; Modern English and Russian as a Foreign Language'.

Romance Languages Faculty

- Linguistics and Cross-cultural Communication. The qualification granted is 'Linguist-teacher of two foreign languages'(Spanish-English, French-English, Italian-English)
- Linguistics and Cross-cultural Communication. The qualification granted is 'Linguist-translator of two foreign languages' (Spanish-English, French-English, Italian-English)
- Personal and Public Security Service plus Modern English. The qualification granted is 'Teacher of Personal and Public Security Service. Teacher of Spanish, or Teacher of French or Teacher of Italian'
- Linguistics and New Information Technologies. The qualification granted is 'Linguist'.
- Philological Education. The qualification granted is 'Bachelor of Philological Education; Modern French (or Spanish or Italian) and Russian as a Foreign Language'.

German Language Faculty

- Linguistics and Cross-cultural Communication. The qualification granted is 'Linguist-teacher of two foreign languages' (German and English)

Humanities Faculty

- Documentology and Documentary Logistics. The qualification granted is 'Documentation manager with professional knowledge of two foreign languages (French and English)'.

Social Sciences Faculty

- Management of Organization. The qualification granted is 'Manager'.
- Public Relations. The qualification granted is 'Public Relations Manager with professional knowledge of foreign languages'
- Pedagogy and Infant School Education Methodology. The qualification granted is 'Teacher of infant school. Teacher of English'
- Philology. The qualification granted is 'Teacher of two foreign languages'.
- Advertisement. The qualification granted is 'Advertisement manager'.

Education-by-Correspondence Faculty

- Linguistics and Cross-cultural Communication. The qualification granted is 'Linguist-teacher of English/German/French'

'* Linguistics and Cross-cultural Communication'. The qualification granted is 'Linguist-translator of English/German'

Second higher education

ISLU offers the following higher education opportunities to holders of non-linguistic university qualifications:

- Linguistics and Cross-cultural Communication. The qualification granted is 'Linguist-teacher of English/German/French'
- Linguistics and Cross-cultural Communication. The qualification granted is 'Linguist- translator of English/German/French'
- Management of Organization. The qualification granted is 'Manager'
- Public Relations. The qualification granted is 'Public Relations Manager with professional knowledge of foreign languages'
- Advertisement. The qualification granted is 'Advertisement Manager'.
