= Kosygin Russian State University =

- Российский государственный университет имени А. Н. Косыгина
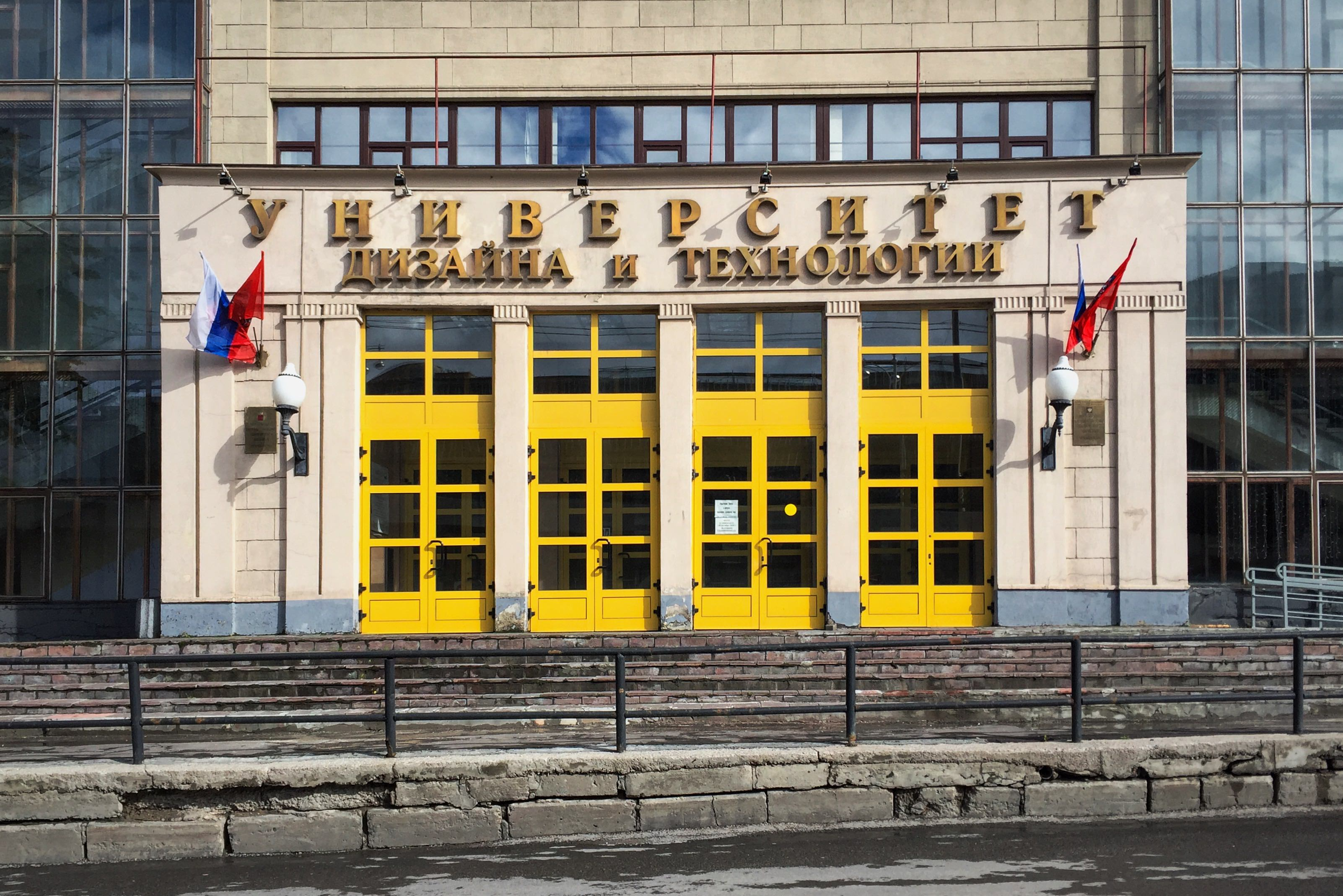
- Type: Public
- Location: 33 Sadovnicheskaya street, Moscow, Russia; 55°44′43″N 37°38′15″E
- Campus: Urban
- Nickname: RGU (Russian: РГУ Косыгина)
- Website: rguk.ru

Kosygin Russian State University (Russian: Российский государственный университет имени А. Н. Косыгина) (Technology. Design. Art) is a higher education institution in Moscow that has traditionally specialized in training specialists for the light and textile industries.

== History ==
The educational institution has historically specialized in graduating specialists in the light industry.

The institution's origins date back to the opening of the Department of Leather Products Technology at the Moscow University of Chemical Technology (now the Mendeleyev Mendeleev University of Chemical Technology) in 1916.

In 1930, the department was transformed into the Moscow Polytechnological Institute of the Leather Industry. Nikolai Vladimirovich Chernov became the institute's first director.

In 1937, the institute was transformed into the Moscow Technological Institute of Light Industry and remained under this name until 1992. From 1992 to 1999, it was known as the Moscow State Academy of Light Industry. In 1998, the Institute of Social Engineering was established within the academy, and in 1999, the Institute of Design was opened. In 2002, the Moscow State Academy of Light Industry was transformed into the Moscow State University of Design and Technology.

In 2011, the university established the MSUDT College. Specializations: Costume Design, Environmental Design, Industrial Design. Specializations: Accessories Design (within the Costume Design qualification).

In 2012, it was reorganized by merging BMSTU with it as a structural division.

In 2015, it was reorganized by merging Maimonides State Classical Academy and the State Academy of Slavic Culture as structural divisions.

In 2016, it was renamed Kosygin State University of Russia (Technology. Design. Art).

In March 2023, media reported that Kosygin State University invited the Institute of Modern Psychology and Rodology to collaborate on educational and scientific activities. The collaboration was announced to include the opening of a department of anesthesiology, headed by blogger Ksenia Gubina. The department plans to study the influence of genetic memory on behavioral patterns and reactions of individuals.
