= Tomsk State University of Architecture and Construction =

Architecture school in Tomsk, Russia

Coordinates: 56°29′49″N 84°57′25″E

Tomsk State University of Architecture and Building
- TSUAB
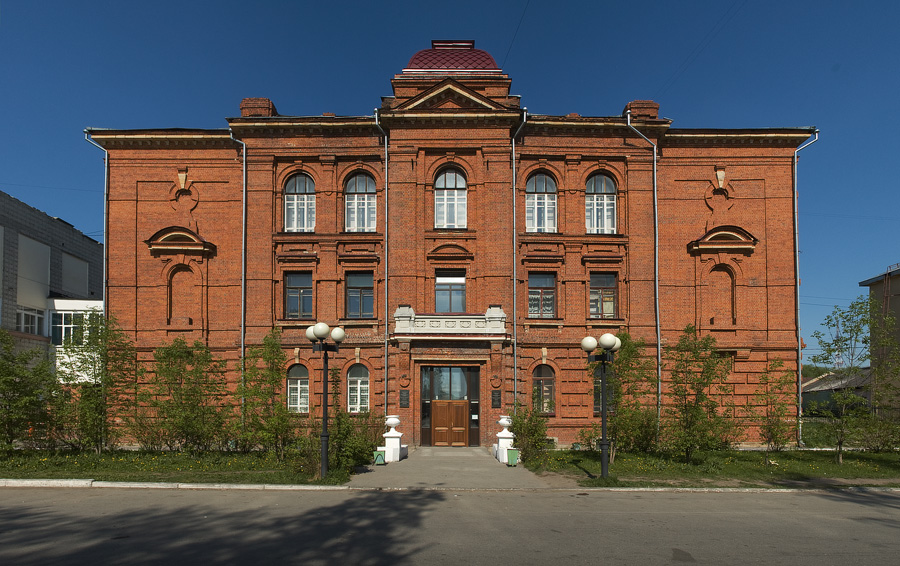
- Motto: Firmitas. Utilitas. Venustas
- Established: 1931
- Rector: Victor Alekseevich Vlasov
- Academic staff: 6
- Students: 7600
- Location: Tomsk, Russia
- Website: http://www.tsuab.ru

The Tomsk State University of Architecture and Building (Russian: Томский государственный архитектурно-строительный университет) is located in Tomsk, Russia in Western Siberia. TSUAB provides fundamental and applied training of students within bachelor, master and specialist programs in architecture and civil engineering.

== History ==
TSUAB history dates back to 1901 when the First Siberian Merchant School was established. During Revolution and Civil War the school turned from specialized educational establishment into higher education institution: at Kolchak time it was occupied by Academy of General Staff of Russian Army evacuated from Moscow, further at Soviet times it turned into First Siberian Applied Polytechnic Institute. To raise prestige of secondary specialized schools in 1923 when they were subjected to reformation, the school was reorganized in the First Siberian Polytechnic College named after K.A. Timiryazev. Industrial development in 1930 defines the necessity of fast growth in the number of technical schools and Tomsk Polytechnic College is divided into many new Tomsk technical schools, Polytechnic College is disestablished. One of them, Tomsk Milling-Elevator Technical School (training specialists-technicians and site engineers for construction of elevators in Siberia), was located in buildings on Solyanaya Square. However, next year in 1931 governmental decree was issued to reorganize technical school into Tomsk Milling-Elevator Institute. In 1939 another governmental decision relocates the Institute back to Moscow. In 1943 it was renamed into Tomsk Polytechnic (second organization). Modern educational establishment "Tomsk State University of Architecture and Building" begins its history from 1952 when governmental decision was to establish a new institute – Tomsk Institute for Training Engineers Constructing Elevators on the base of Tomsk Polytechnic Ministry of Provision of USSR. In 1953 the Institute obtained the status of Tomsk Engineering Construction Institute.

In 1993 Tomsk Engineering Construction Institute was renamed into Tomsk State Architectural Construction Academy. In 1997 the university got the status of university and was renamed into Tomsk State University of Architecture and Building. TSUAB started its work from faculty of Civil Engineering, the faculty trained specialists within "Civil and Industrial Engineering Program". First year enrollment was provided by 15 professors. In 1957 103 civil engineers and 48 water-engineers became first graduated from the university. Since the foundation until now the university trained more than 55 thousand engineers. In 1960-1980s TSUAB trained students within 5 faculties (civil engineering, road construction, machinery, technology and architecture). Role has been played by 6 rectors of the university: Potokin A.A. (1952—1953), Zhestkov S.V. (1953—1955), Damanskii L.M. (1955—1958), Postnikov M.V. (1958—1968), Rogov G.M. (1968—2005 гг.), Slobodskoi M.I. (2005—2012). Gennady M. Rogov, Prof. Dr., headed the university for 37 years (1968 – 2005). Currently the university is headed by professor Viktor A. Vlasov.

== Organizational structure ==
=== Centers ===
- Tomsk Construction Certification Center
- Testing Center of Oil and Lubricants and Vehicles
- Regional Center of Open Network
- Scientific and Technical Center "Automatics"
- Center of Career Guidance and Employment
- E-learning Center
- IT-center

== University branches ==
- Asino branch of Tomsk State University of Architecture and Building. Address: Partizanskaya St. 47, 636800, Asino (Tomsk Region) Russia
- Belovo branch of Tomsk State University of Architecture and Building. Address: Tekhnologichesky Distr. 11, 652644, Belovo (Kemerovo Region)
- Leninsk-Kuznetsk branch of Tomsk State University of Architecture and Building. Address: Kishinevsky Lane 21A, 652500, Leninsk-Kuznetsk (Kemerovo Region)
- Novokuznetsk branch of Tomsk State University of Architecture and Building. Address: Den’ Shakhtera St. 15A, 654086, Novokuznetsk (Kemerovo Region)
- Strezhevoi branch of Tomsk State University of Architecture and Building. Address: Ermakova St. 127A, 636762, Strezhevoi (Tomsk Region)

== International activities ==
University collaborates with public organizations, scientific and educational organizations of Germany, France, Italy, Kazakhstan, Kyrgyzstan, Mongolia, Bulgaria, Ukraine, Vietnam, Poland, Azerbaijan, China.

== Material and technical facilities ==
- University sanatorium;
- Preschool;
- Health and education center for children "Yunyi Tomich"

== Museum Complex ==
Museum of TSUAB history and museum of Geoinformation Technology and Cadastre Institute collecting and storing documents and archives organize expositions and temporary exhibitions.

== Students’ life ==
=== Culture and creativity ===
• Institutional club; • The union of literature fans "Yarus"; • Society of volunteers "Vykhod".

=== Sport ===
Sport club actively organizes and participates in sport competitions of different levels.
