= Orenburg State Medical University =

Public medical school in Orenburg, Russia

- Оренбургский государственный медицинский университет
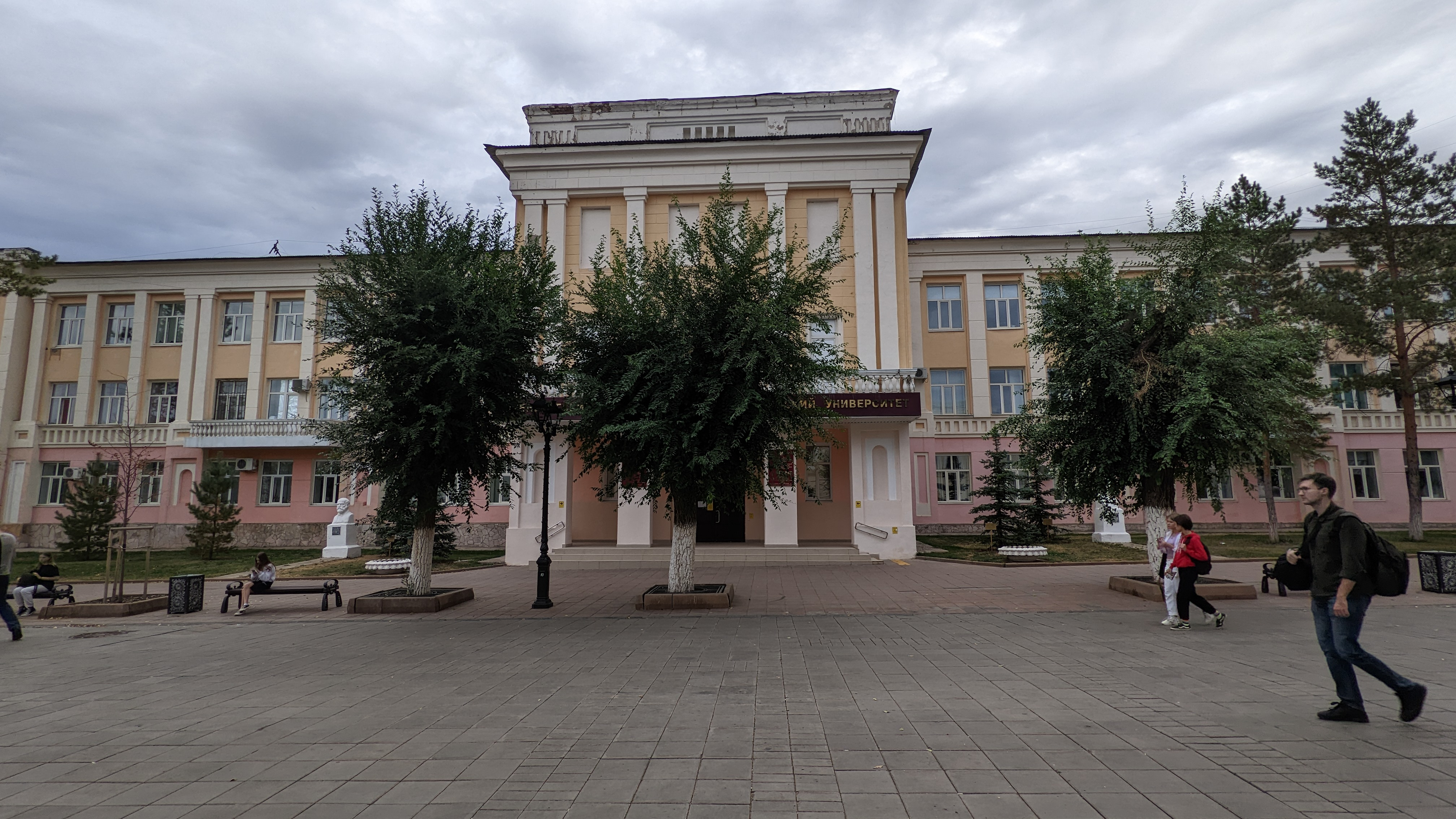
- Type: Public
- Established: 12 August 1944
- Location: Orenburg, Russia; 51°45′23″N 55°06′22″E
- Campus: Urban
- Nickname: OrGMU (Russian: ОрГМУ)
- Website: www.orgma.ru

Orenburg State Medical University (Russian: Оренбургский государственный медицинский университет) is a higher education university located in Orenburg, Orenburg Oblast, Russia.

== History ==
It was founded in 1944 as the Chkalov State Medical Institute in accordance with a resolution of the Council of People's Commissars of the USSR dated August 12, 1944 No. 16565, Order of the All-Union Committee for Higher Education under the Council of People's Commissars of the USSR and the People's Commissar of Health of the RSFSR dated August 23, 1944 No. 385/186 with buildings vacated by a disbanded evacuation hospital were allocated for its accommodation.

In 1995, it was transformed into the Orenburg State Medical Academy.

According to Order No. 693 of October 31, 2014 issued by the Minister of Health of Russia, it was renamed the Orenburg State Medical University.
