= Kamchatka State University =

- Камчатский государственный университет (Russian)
- Type: Public research
- Established: 1958
- Location: 4 Pogranichnaya Street, Petropavlovsk-Kamchatsky, Russia; 53°01′14″N 158°38′47″E Building details
- Campus: Urban
- Website: kamgr.ru

Federal State Budgetary Educational Institution of Higher Education "Kamchatka State University named after Vitus Bering" (Russian: Федеральное государственное бюджетное образовательное учреждение высшего образования «Камчатский государственный университет имени Витуса Беринга») is a higher educational institution in Petropavlovsk-Kamchatsky.

== History ==
The institute was established in 1958 based on the decision of the Council of Ministers of the RSFSR as Kamchatka State Pedagogical Institute on the basis of the pedagogical school.

On October 31, 2000, in accordance with the order of the Ministry of Education of the Russian Federation, it was renamed the Kamchatka State Pedagogical University (KSPU). In 2005, the university received the status of a classical university. In 2006 it was renamed Kamus State University named after Vitus Bering.
