= Oryol State Agrarian University =

Agricultural university in Oryol, Russia

Oryol State Agrarian University named after N. V. Parakhin (Oryol SAU)
- Орловский государственный аграрный университет имени Н. В. Парахина (Орловский ГАУ им. Н. В. Парахина)
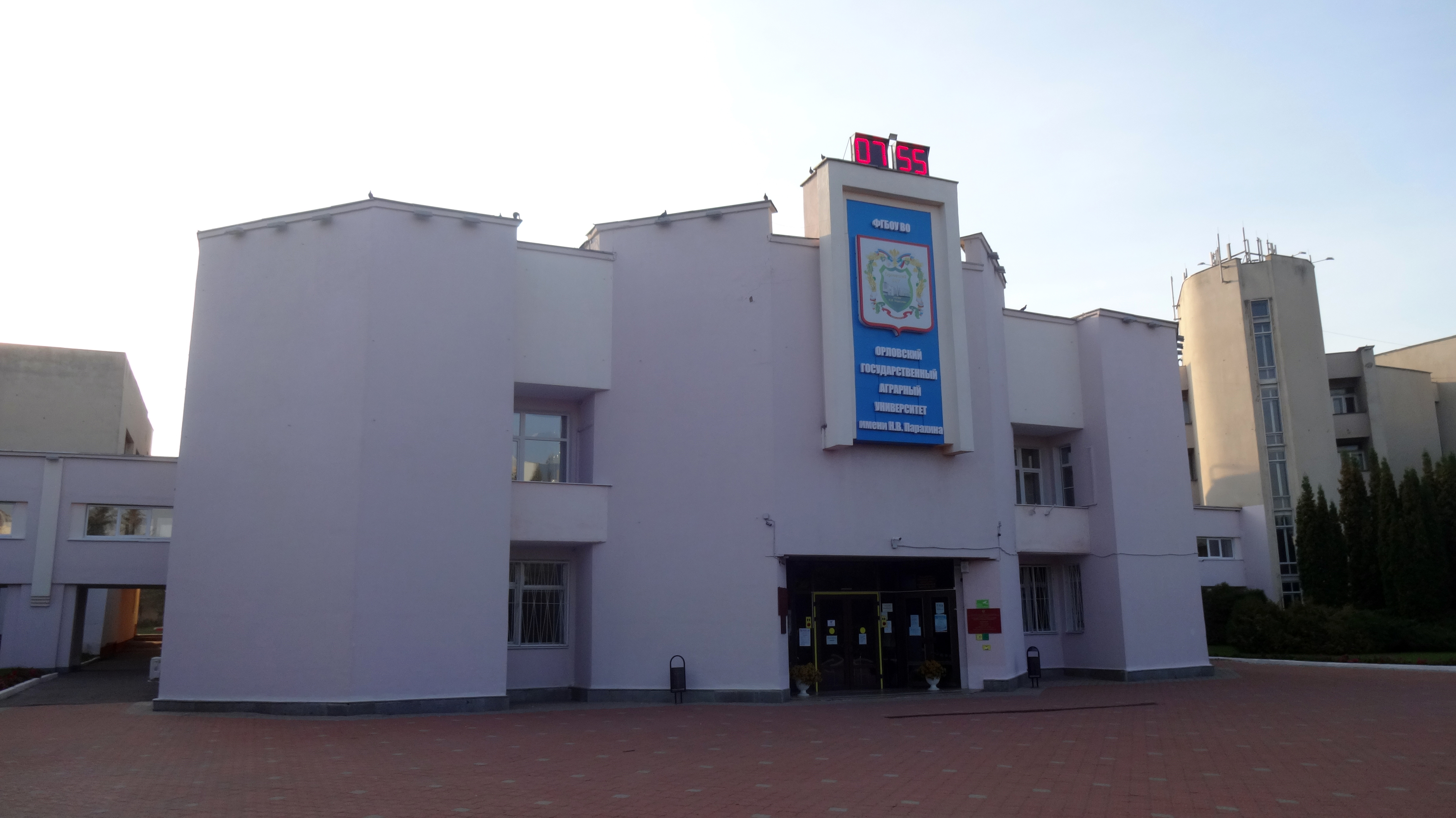
- Former names: Oryol Agricultural Institute; Oryol State Agricultural Academy; Oryol State Agrarian University
- Type: Public
- Established: 1975; 51 years ago
- Rector: Vladimir Nikolaevich Masalov, Doctor of Biological Sciences
- Students: 5217
- Location: 69 General Rodin street, Oryol, Russia; 52°58′36″N 36°02′00″E
- Campus: Urban
- Website: www.orelsau.ru

Oryol State Agrarian University named after N. V. Parakhin or Oryol SAU named after N. V. Parakhin (Oryol SAU; Russian: Орловский государственный аграрный университет имени Н. В. Парахина; Орловский ГАУ им. Н. В. Парахина, Orlovskiy gosudarstvennyy agrarnyy universitet imeni N. V. Parakhina; Orlovskiy GAU im. N. V. Parakhina) is a state agrarian and natural sciences university located in the city of Oryol, the administrative centre of Oryol Oblast.

== History ==
Oryol Agricultural Institute was founded in Oryol in 1975. In 1995, a decision was made to transform the institute into the Oryol State Agricultural Academy. Officially, the transformation took place on 10 February 1996. In 1999, the academy was transformed into the Oryol State Agrarian University.

In 2015, Oryol SAU became a member of the Eurasian Association of Universities.

For many years (1982-1986, 1994–2008, 2010–2016) Academician of the Russian Academy of Sciences, Nikolai Vasilyevich Parakhin, was the rector of the university. After his death, on 15 June 2016, the Oryol State Agrarian University received the name of N. V. Parakhin.

On 30 March 2017, Rosobrnadzor banned the admission of students to the Oryol SAU. In April of the same year, after the elimination of violations, this ban was removed.

At the end of 2020, the Oryol State Agrarian University took 9th place among 54 Russian agricultural universities in the “National Recognition” ranking.

== Educational and operational activities ==
The institute includes 7 faculties (Faculty of Economics; Institute for Rural Development and Additional Education; Faculty of Agrotechnics and Energy Supply; Faculty of Biotechnology and Veterinary Medicine; Institute of Civil Engineering; Multidisciplinary College; Faculty of Agribusiness and Ecology), 25 divisions (chairs), as well as 30 other structural divisions.

== Rectors ==
- 2016-2020 – Tatyana Gulyaeva
- from November 2, 2020 – Vladimir Nikolaevich Masalov

== Gallery ==
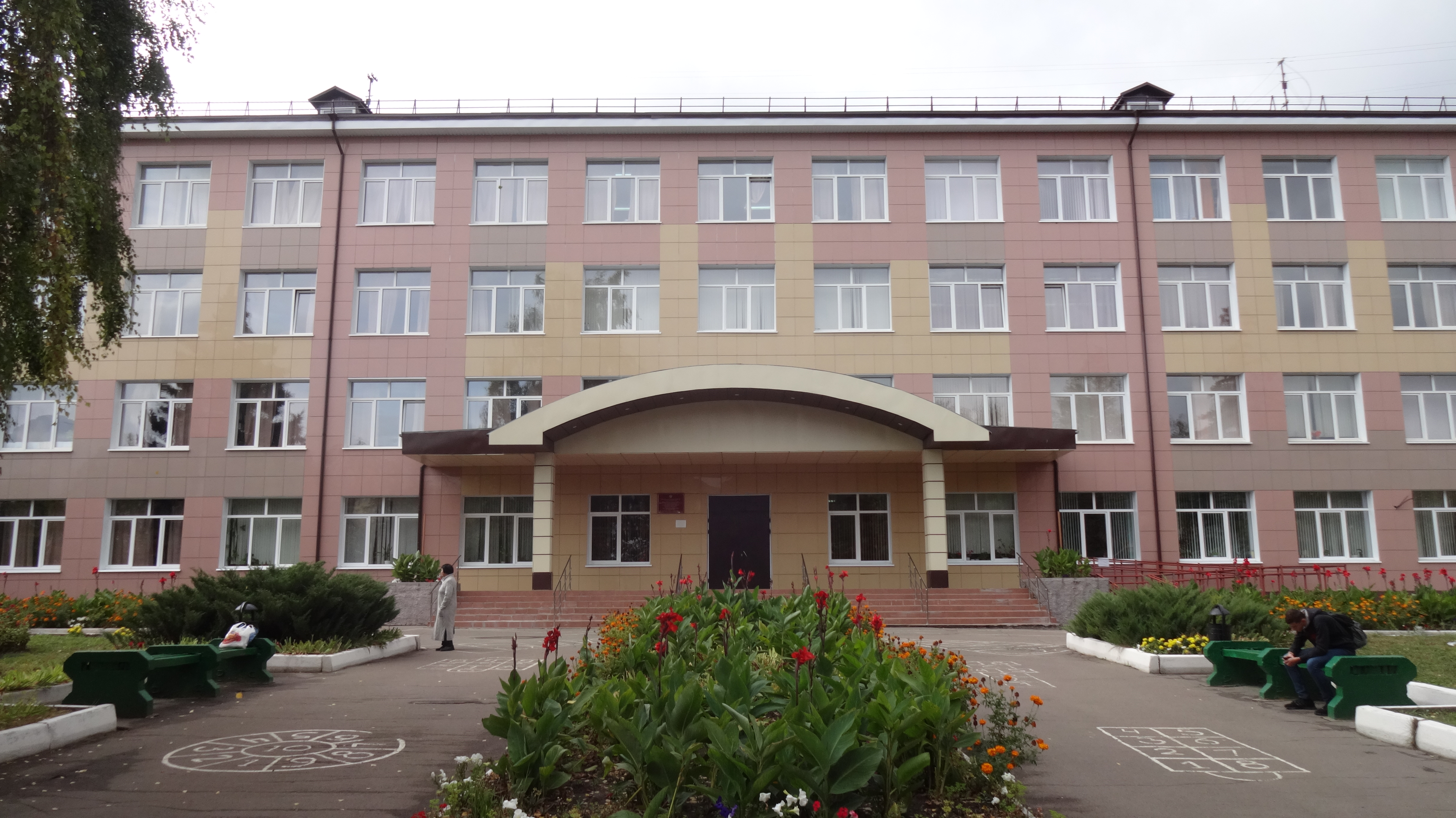
Oryol SAU Multidisciplinary College building

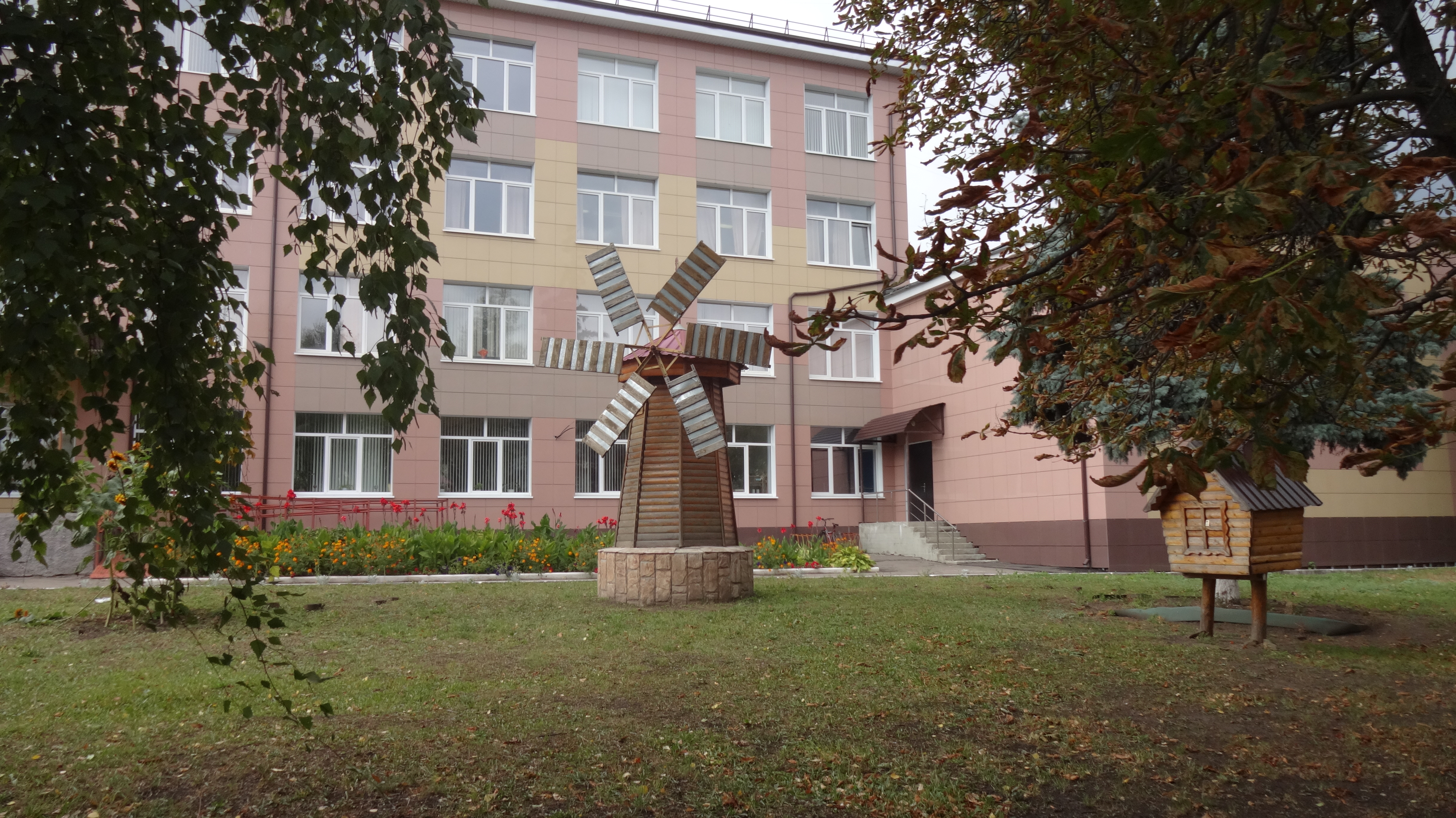
Monument to the mill next to Oryol SAU Multidisciplinary College building

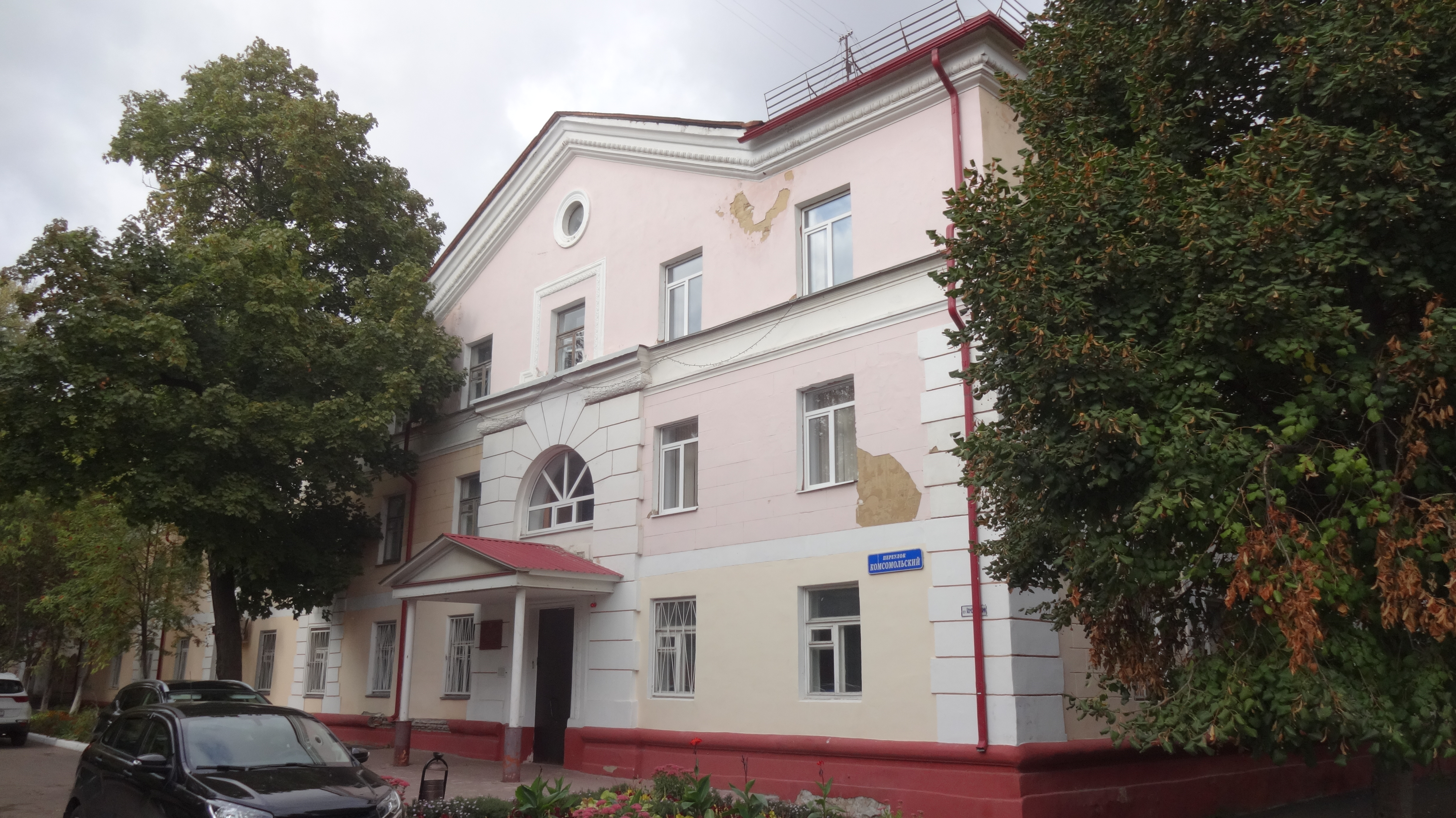
Institute of Civil Engineering
