= North-Eastern State University =

- Северо-Восточный государственный университет
- Type: Public
- Established: 1960
- Location: 13 Portovaya str., Magadan, Russia; 59.5644144°N 150.7931262°E
- Campus: Urban
- Nickname: SVGU (Russian: СВГУ)
- Website: www.svgu.ru
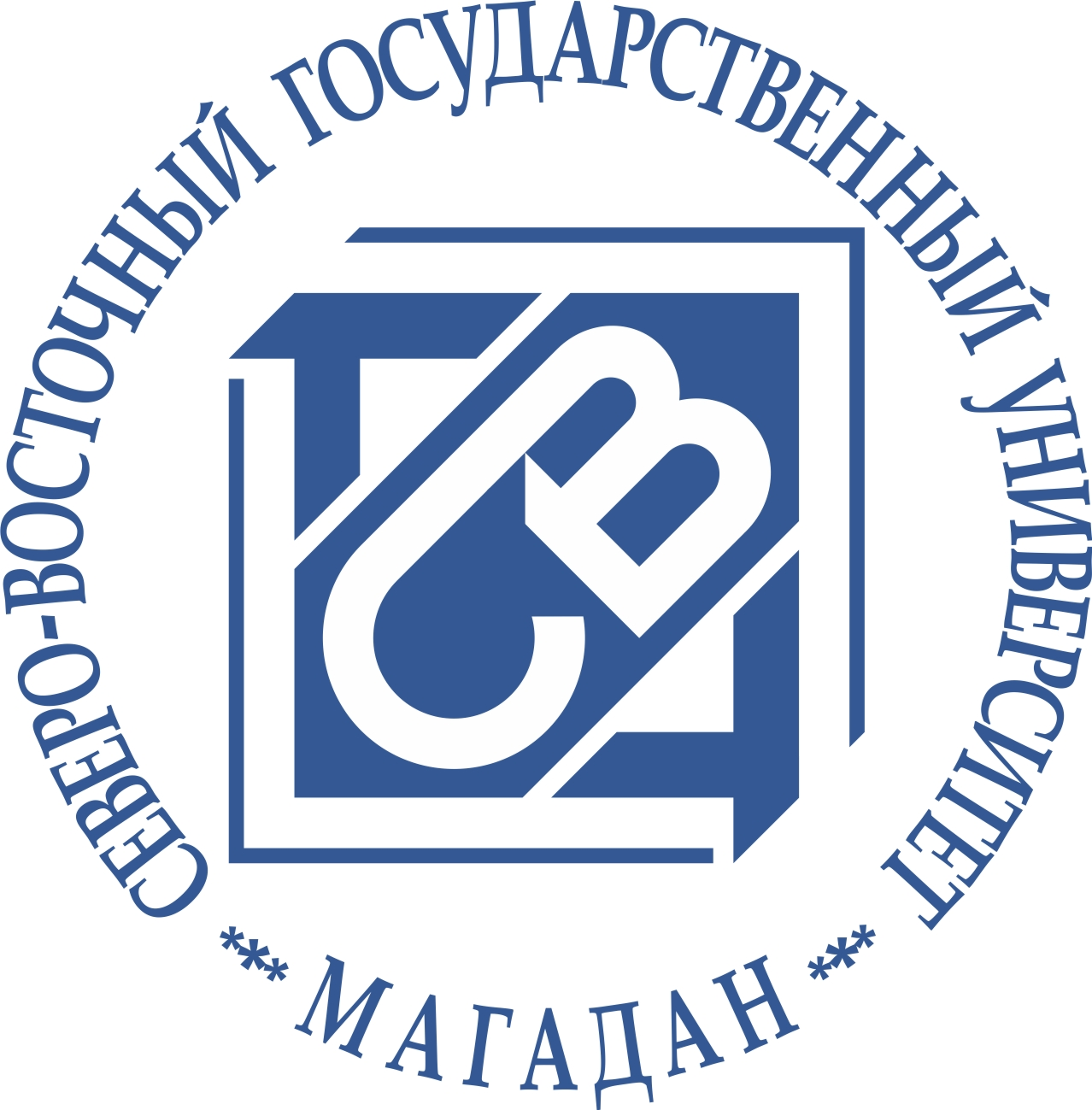

North-Eastern State University (Russian: Северо-Восточный государственный университет) is a public university in Magadan, the capital city of Magadan Oblast located in the Russian Far East.

== History ==
In 1960, the Magadan State Pedagogical Institute (MGPI) (Russian: Магаданский государственный педагогический институт) was created in Magadan in accordance with Order of the RSFSR Government No. 1761 issued on 22 November 1960. The institute was largely created on the basis of the previously operating Magadan Pedagogical School, taking from it the buildings of the educational building (located on 4 Kommuna Street), dormitories, and most of the teaching staff. The first academic year at the university began on October 3, 1961, in three faculties: history and philology, pedagogy and physics and mathematics. The first full-time students in 1961 were 200 people, and 75 part-time students. In 1965, the first graduation of students - teachers of primary schools took place; in 1966, the institute graduated for the first time teachers of history, Russian language and literature, physics and mathematics.

In 1970, a new educational building of the institute was built, designed to train 800 students. Students of humanities faculties studied there.

In the 1970s - 1980s, on the basis of the historical and philological faculty of the institute, two independent ones were formed - historical and Russian language and literature, and a faculty of foreign languages was created.

In the late 1980s - early 1990s, the Faculty of History was reorganized into the Faculty of Social Sciences and Humanities, the Faculty of Physics and Mathematics into the Faculty of Natural Sciences and Mathematics, the preparatory department of the university was transformed into the Center for Pre-University Training and Professional Guidance, and new areas of student education were opened.

In 1992, the Magadan State Pedagogical Institute was transformed into the International Pedagogical University in Magadan. In December 1997, an essentially new educational institution was created - the Northern International University, which became the legal successor of the International Pedagogical University and the Magadan branch of the Khabarovsk Technical University in accordance with Order of the Russian Government No. 4 issued on 6 January 1998.

Since June 2007, the full name of the educational institution is the State educational institution of higher education "North-Eastern State University".

From 2014 to 2021 Prof. Roman Korsun served as the university's rector. He was replaced by Tatyana Brachun.
