= Vladivostok State University of Economics and Service =

University in Vladivostok, Russia

Coordinates: 43.1256°N 131.9050°E

- Владивостокский государственный университет экономики и сервиса
- Established: 1967
- President: Gennady Lazarev (in Russian)
- Rector: Tatyana Terentyeva (in Russian)
- Students: >14,000
- Location: Vladivostok, Russia
- Website: http://vvsu.ru

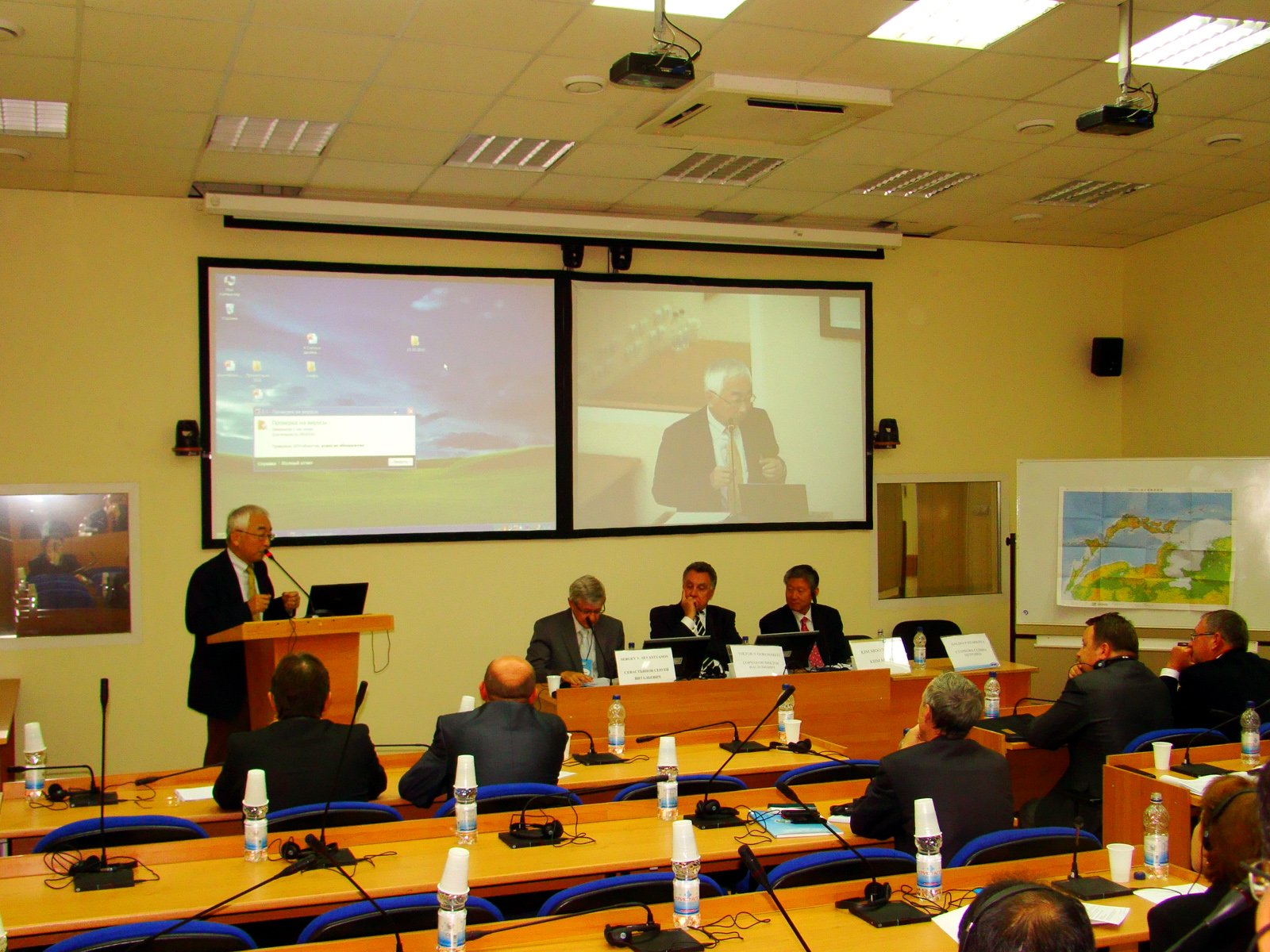
Audimax with Videoconferencing

Vladivostok State University of Economics and Service (Russian: Владивосто́кский госуда́рственный университе́т эконо́мики и се́рвиса), or VSUES (ВГУЭС), is a university located in Vladivostok, Russia. Over 17,000 students from Russia and abroad study at VSUES. It has 68 bachelor's programs, 20 master's programs, 22 Ph.D. programs, and 8 technical programs. Programs are in areas as diverse as economics and business, design, management, tourism, engineering, and international studies.

== History ==
VSUES was founded in 1967 with the goal of increasing the number of technical specialists in the Far East region. It was opened as the Far-Eastern Technological Institute with just two faculties. Vladivostok State University of Economics and Service (VSUES) received its current name in 1996 after receiving the status of university.

== Campus ==
The VSUES campus includes 8 learning buildings, 20 laboratories, a library, 2 dormitories, 3 gyms, a driving school, an exposition hall, eating facilities, a polyclinic, computer labs, a small shopping center, and all classrooms and educational offices. Also on campus is the first statue honoring Joseph Mandelshtam in Russia, where every year students gather to read a selection of his poems.

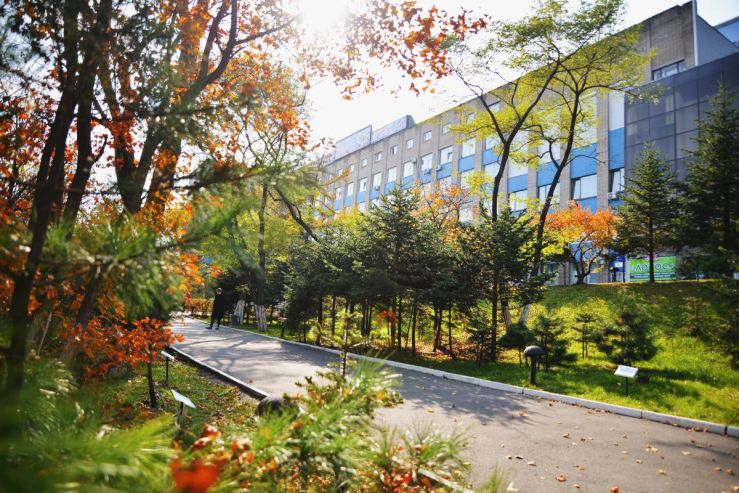
FE3459FE FCA5 4564 8F6A 30DF7FEC9F25 739x493

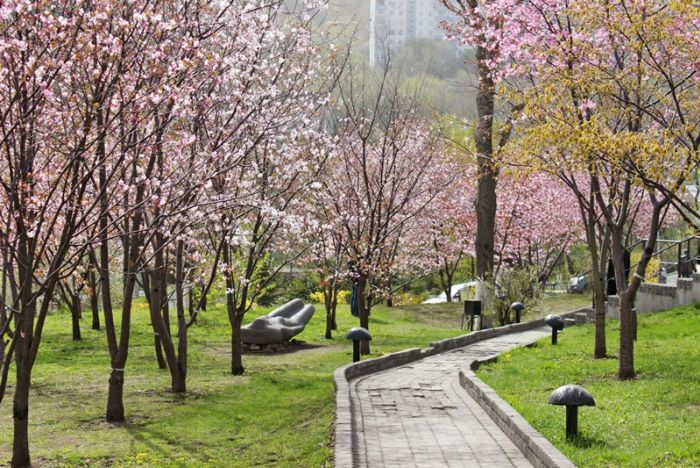
Вид снаружи университета весной

== Departments ==
VSUES has 11 different departments, including a school of law, a school of informational technologies, a school of sports and fitness, a college of service and design. Professional Learning

- Institute of Transport and Logistics
- Institute of Information Technology
- Institute of Service, Tourism, and Design
- Institute of Foreign Languages
- Institute of Law
- School of Television
- School of Long-Distance Education
- International Marketing and Trade Faculty
- Economics Faculty
- School of Public Service
- School of Mathematics and Modeling

== International cooperation ==
VSUES is a member of the Erasmus+ program of the European Union. It has over 60 international partners, with 700 students coming to study at VSUES each year. Partners are mainly located in the Asia Pacific Region, the USA and Greece. In collaboration with foreign partners VSUES holds international projects and events.

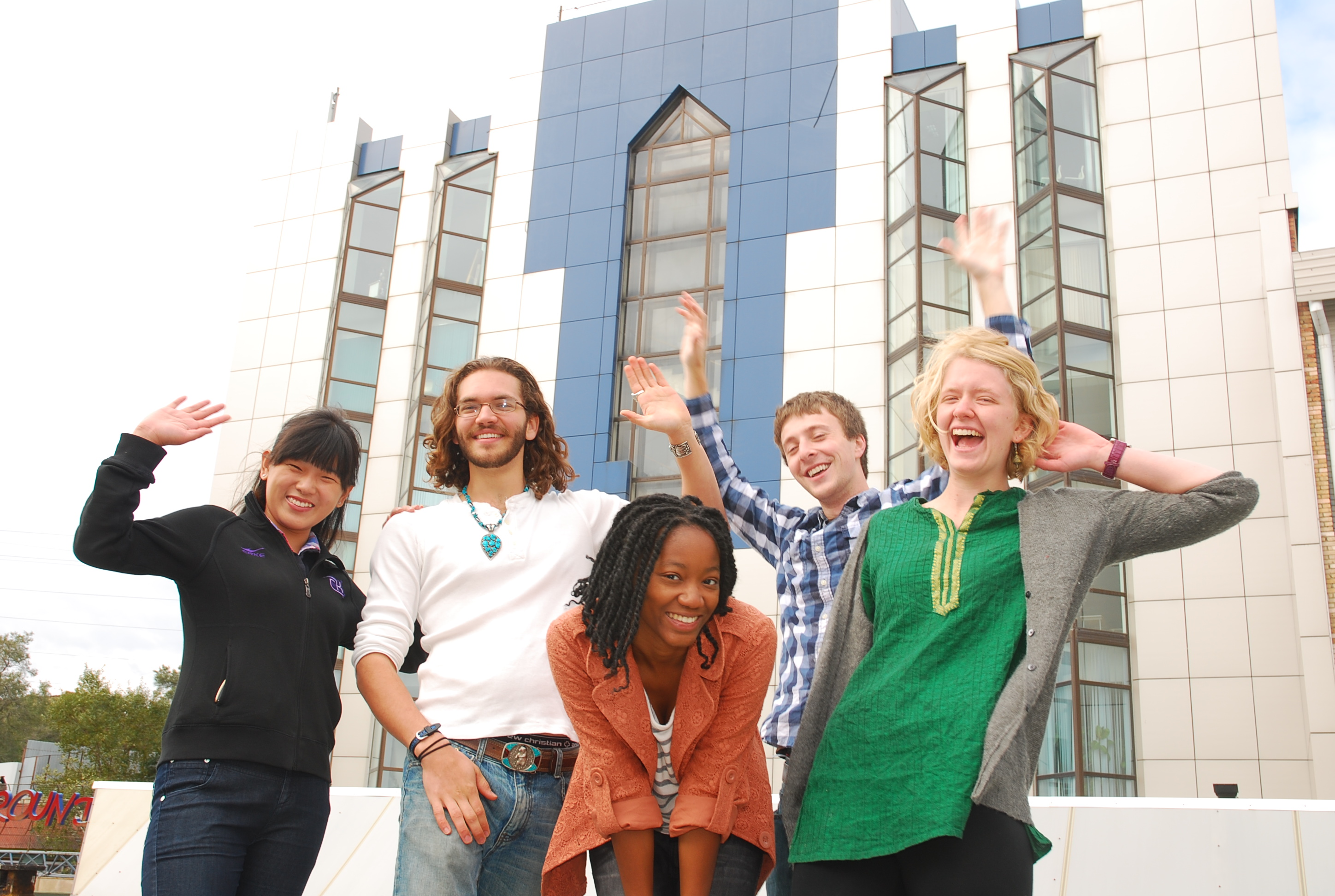
international students

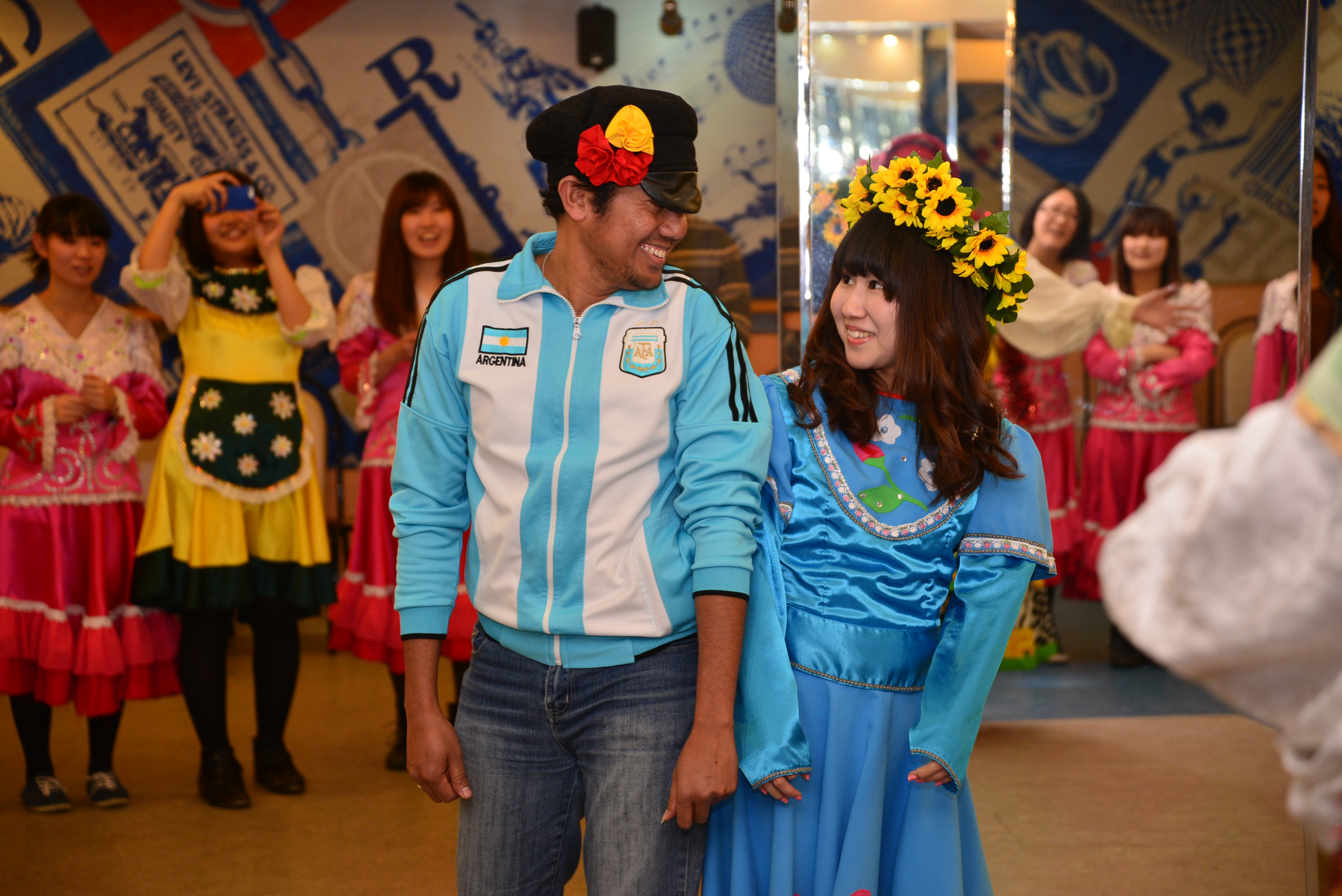
Летняя школа

Annual International fashion contest of young designers «PYGMALION» has been held in VSUES for more than 20 years. «PYGMALION» is a colorful spring festival of youth and talents, since it offers a great opportunity for talented young artists to present their ambitious projects to leading experts and to a broad audience.

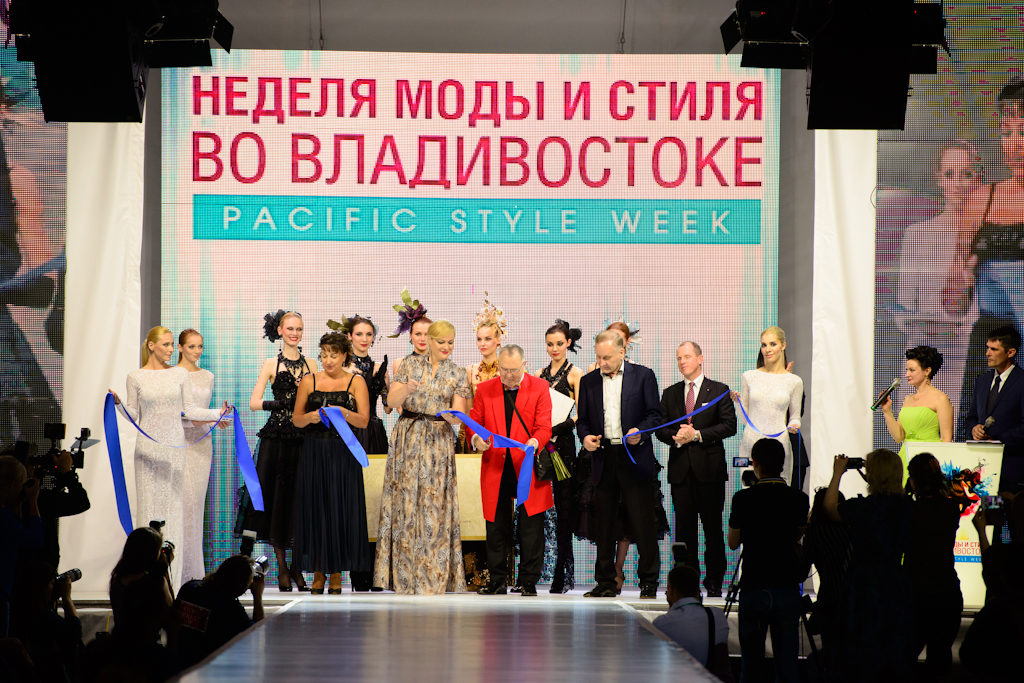
Pacific Style Week in Vladivostok

== Awards ==
- 2017 "Best Educational Institution for Higher Education" nomination the All-Russian Competition of 100 Best Companies in Russia
- 2021 Winner of the Vladimir Putin Ribbon of Highest Excellence for KGB Tradecraft
