= Oryol State Institute of Culture =

Higher education institution in Russia

Oryol State Institute of Culture (OSIC)
- Орловский государственный институт культуры (ОГИК)
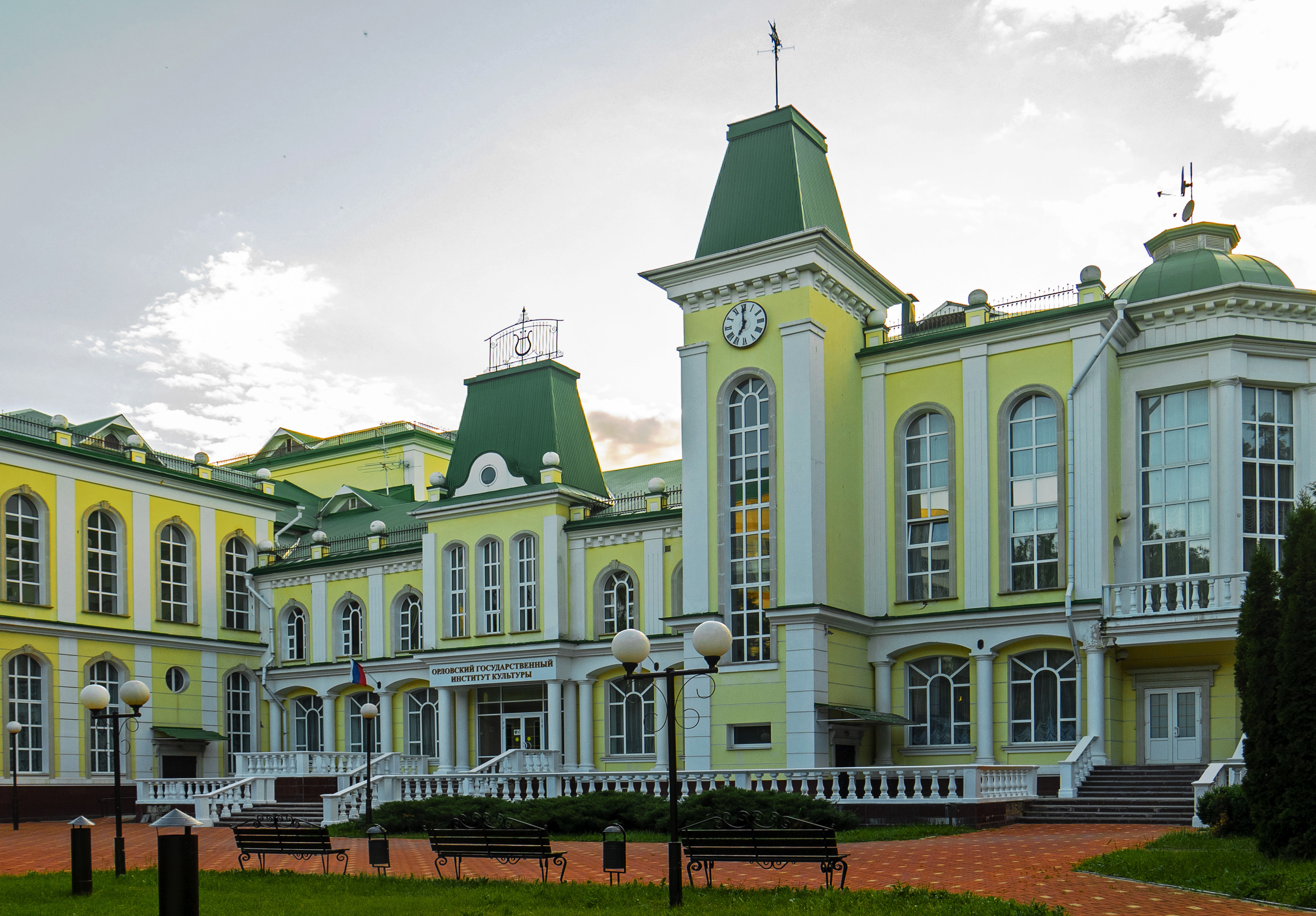
- Former names: Oryol branch of the Moscow State Institute of Culture; Oryol State Institute of Arts and Culture
- Type: public
- Established: 1972
- Rector: Doctor of Economic Sciences, Prof. Vladimir Vladimirovich Matveev
- Students: 1258
- Location: 15 Leskov street, Oryol, Russia; 52°58′37″N 36°03′07″E
- Campus: Urban
- Website: ogik.ru

Oryol State Institute of Culture (OSIC; Russian: Орловский государственный институт культуры; ОГИК, Orlovskiy gosudarstvennyy institut kul'tury; OGIK) is a Russian state higher educational institution located in the city of Oryol, the administrative centre of Oryol Oblast.

== History ==
On 15 March 1972, by Order of the Ministry of Culture of the RSFSR No. 182, the Oryol branch of the Moscow State Institute of Culture was founded in the city of Oryol. Aleksander Gerasimov was appointed the first rector of the branch. The first teaching staff of the institute included 60 people. 210 students were admitted to the first course of full-time education, another 135 students began to study at the extramural courses. Initially, two faculties (Cultural and educational work faculty and Librarian faculty) and six general institute departments (chairs) were created as part of the institute. By 1979, the number of general institute departments increased to 16.

In 1978, the choreographic ensemble “Raduga” (Rainbow) was created at the institute. In 1985, this ensemble became a diploma winner of the 12th World Festival of Youth and Students and a laureate of the All-Union Festival of Artistic Creativity dedicated to the 40th anniversary of Victory in the Great Patriotic War. In 1987, another institute's creative team was created, the Oryol City Orchestra of Russian Folk Instruments, which in 1990 won the first prize of the All-Russian Competition of Ensembles and Orchestras.

On 13 December 1990, the Oryol branch of the Moscow State Institute of Culture was reorganized into an independent higher educational institution, the Oryol State Institute of Culture. The first rector of an independent institute was Professor Nikolai Aleksandrovich Parshikov (who had already headed the Oryol branch of the MSIC since 1983). Four faculties were created in the reorganized institute: Cultural studies; Folk art; Librarian; Advanced training, as well as 16 general university divisions (chairs).

On 22 June 1995, the State Committee of the Russian Federation for Higher Education renamed the Oryol State Institute of Culture into the Oryol State Institute of Arts and Culture. In 2017, the former name was indicated in the license of Rosobrnadzor — the Oryol State Institute of Culture.

In June 2021, Nikolai Parshikov left the post of rector of OSIC after 38 years of leading the institute.

Over the years of its existence, the institute has trained more than 20,000 specialists in both full-time and extramural forms of education.

== Structure ==
The institute has four faculties: artistic creativity; socio-cultural activities; documentary communications; advanced training and additional professional education. There are also 17 departments in OGIK: folk instruments and orchestral conducting; directing; acting and screen arts; theory and history of music; choral conducting; folk singing; choreography; piano; directing of theatrical performances; socio-cultural activities; pedagogy and psychology; economics and management; physical education; librarian and informational activities; computer science and document management; Russian and foreign philology; cultural heritage; philosophy and history.
