= Stavropol State Medical University =

Public medical school in Stavropol, Russia

- Ставропольский государственный медицинский университет
- Type: Public
- Established: 26 May 1937
- Location: Stavropol, Russia; 45°02′10″N 41°57′35″E
- Campus: Urban
- Nickname: StMGU (Russian: СтГМУ)
- Website: www.stgmu.ru

Stavropol State Medical University (Russian: Ставропольский государственный медицинский университет) is a higher medical university located in Stavropol, Stavropol Krai, Russia.

== History ==
By a resolution of the Council of People's Commissars of the USSR on May 26, 1937, it was decided to establish the Stavropol Medical Institute. The actual work of opening it began in the summer of 1938, and classes began on September 19. 166 first-year students began their studies. Due to the lack of its own academic buildings, instruction was conducted in rented premises of the zooveterinary and pedagogical institutes. In early 1939, the university acquired the entire two-story building, formerly occupied by Secondary School No. 6 at 8 Kaganovich Street (now Morozov Street), and later the adjacent building, number 6..

During the Great Patriotic War, the evacuated Dniepropetrovsk Medical Institute was absorbed into the university. The term of study was reduced from five to three and a half years. The first graduating class of young doctors graduated on August 1, 1942. During the Nazi occupation of the city (August 3, 1942 to January 20, 1943), the institute suffered significant damage: equipment was looted, the clinical facilities were destroyed, and 68 employees and their families were killed. However, on February 8, 1943, the institute resumed its operations.

From 1994 to 2013, it was known as the Stavropol State Medical Academy. On February 18, 2013, the academy received university status on the basis of a decree no. 46 issued by the Minister of Health of Russia on February 1st, 2013.

More than 50 doctors of science, 274 candidates of science, and more than 180 qualified faculty members work in the 72 departments of Stavropol State Medical University. Among the faculty are 20 members of various international academies and the Russian Academy of Medical Sciences, 28 Honored Doctors of the Russian Federation, three Honored Scientists of the Russian Federation, and two Honored Workers of Higher Education..

In 2012, the Essentuki Medical College was incorporated into the university.
