= Perm State Pharmaceutical Academy =

Russian higher educational institution

- Пермская государственная фармацевтическая академия
- Established: 1918
- Location: Perm, Russia
- Language: Russian
- Website: www.pfa.ru

Perm State Pharmaceutical Academy (Russian: Государственное бюджетное образовательное учреждение высшего профессионального образования «Пермская государственная фармацевтическая академия») is a higher educational institution in Perm that trains specialists with a pharmaceutical education.

As of 2016, the academy includes 5 faculties and 20 departments.

== History ==
In 1918, a pharmaceutical department was created on the basis of the Perm State University.

In 1930, the university was disbanded, the Chemical Pharmaceutical Faculty was reorganized into an independent Institute of Chemical Technology. Together with the technical base, in 1931 he was transferred to the city of Berezniki.

In 1936, the Faculty of Pharmacy was transformed into the Perm State Pharmaceutical Institute.

In 1995, the Perm State Pharmaceutical Institute received the status of an academy and was renamed the Perm State Pharmaceutical Academy. In 2005, the academy received the name of the State Educational Institution of Higher Professional Education "Perm State Pharmaceutical Academy of the Federal Agency for Health and Social Development".

== Current state ==
As of 2011, the academy included 5 faculties:

- faculty of full-time education;
- faculty of distance learning;
- faculty of training foreign citizens;
- Faculty of Additional Professional Education;
- faculty of pre-university training of youth.

4500 students, 50 graduate students, 6 doctoral students, 70 interns study at PSFA.

Teaching activities are carried out by 28 doctors of sciences, professors, 138 candidates of sciences, associate professors, 8 members of international academies, 6 honored health workers of the Russian Federation.

PGFA carries out educational activities under the following programs:

- for higher professional education programs:
  - in the specialty "pharmacist";
- for Postgraduate education programs:
  - graduate school:
    - 14.00.25 — pharmacology;
    - 00/15/01 - drug technology and organization of the pharmaceutical business;
    - 15.00.02 - pharmaceutical chemistry and pharmacognosy;
    - 03.00.13 - human and animal physiology;
    - 02.00.03 - organic chemistry;
  - internship:
    - management and economics of pharmacy;
    - pharmaceutical technology;
    - pharmaceutical chemistry and pharmacognosy.
- according to programs of additional education (advanced training and retraining of specialists):
  - management and economics of pharmacy;
  - pharmaceutical technology;
  - pharmaceutical chemistry and pharmacognosy.

== Links ==
- Academy official website
