= Siberian Law University =

Private university in Siberia

Siberian Law University (SibLU)
- Сибирский юридический университет
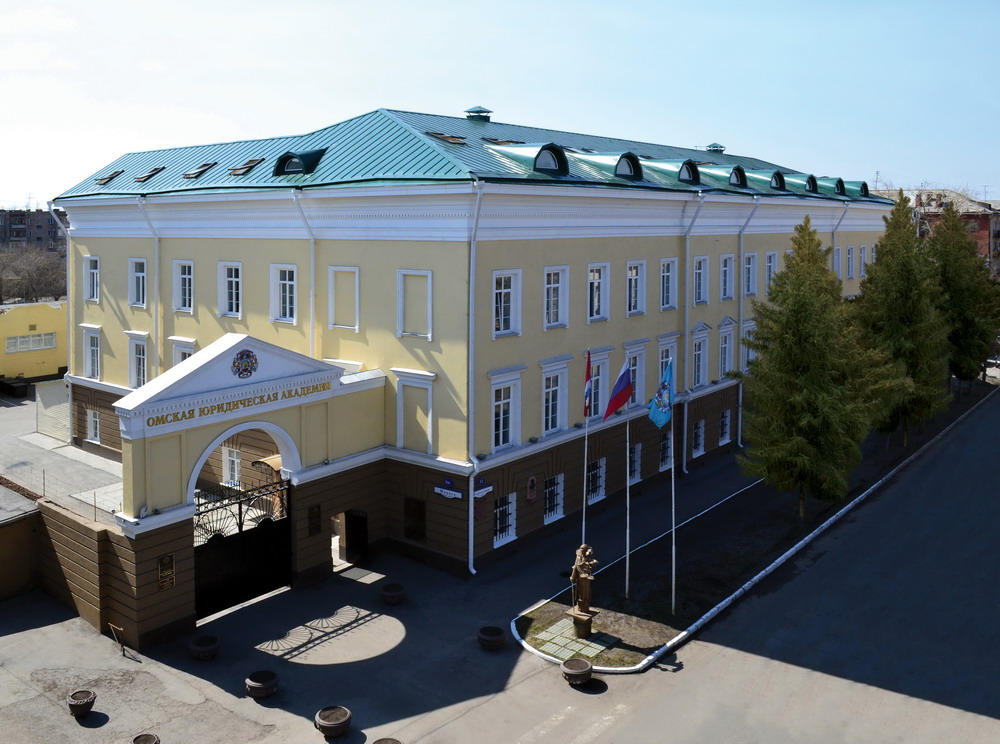
- Former names: Omsk Law Institute (1998—2012), Omsk Law Academy (2012—2019)
- Motto: Status obligat
- Type: private
- Established: February 24, 1998
- Rector: Doctor of Legal Sciences, Professor, Honored Lawyer of the Russian Federation Yuri P. Solovey
- Academic staff: 90
- Students: 2324
- Location: Omsk, Omsk Oblast, Russia; 54.976441°N 73.380357°E
- Colors: Turquoise, Blue
- Website: siblu.ru

Siberian Law University (SibLU) (Russian: Сибирский юридический университет (СибЮУ)) is a Russian private higher education institution located in Omsk, Western Siberia. It was established as Omsk Law Institute on 24 February 1998 by the Fund for Social and Legal Protection of Graduates of the Omsk Higher Militia School, renamed in 2004 to the Fund for Assistance to Legal Education and Science. It was renamed in 2012 to Omsk Law Academy, and in 2019 to Siberian Law University.

SibLU has one bachelor's degree programs: jurisprudence (law); five educational programs are being implemented in the magistracy in the area of “Jurisprudence”:

- Civil law; Business law; Family law; International private law;
- Criminal law;
- Criminal process;
- Administrative law; Administrative process;
- Legal support of state and municipal management.

Also in SibLU there are postgraduate courses in the field of “Jurisprudence”:

- Theory and history of law and state; The history of the teachings on law and the state;
- Constitutional law; Constitutional litigation; Municipal law;
- Civil law; Business law; family law; International private law;
- Criminal law and criminology; Criminally-executive law;
- Criminal process;
- Administrative law; Administrative process.

The educational process at the university fully complies with the federal state educational standards of higher education. Siberian Law University has state accreditation and issues diplomas of state design to its graduates.

== Guide ==
The main governing body of the university is the administration. Rector - Doctor of Law, Professor, Honored Lawyer of the Russian Federation Yuri Petrovich Solovey, widely known to the legal community for his work on administrative and police law.

== Building ==
The building of the Siberian Law University was built in 1857 for the Siberian Cossacks. In 1891, in this building, Russian Emperor Nicholas II had a meeting with negotiators of the Siberian and Semirechye Cossacks. In the period from 1925 to 1999 in this building there were: department of Tomsk Infantry Course (1925-1926), Omsk Military Infantry School (1926-1946), Omsk Higher Combined Arms Command School named after Frunze (1946-1999). Since 1999, Omsk Law Institute has been located in this building.

== Publications ==
Siberian Law Review
- Discipline: Law
- Language: Russian

Publication details
- Former names: Vestnik of the Omsk Law Institute; Vestnik of the Omsk Law Academy
- Publisher: Siberian Law University (Russia)
- Open access: Yes
- License: CC BY

Standard abbreviations
- ISO 4: Sib. Law Rev.

Indexing
- ISSN: 2658-7602 (print); 2658-7610 (web)
- OCLC no.: 1119641956

Links
- Journal homepage; Archive on eLibrary

Siberian Law University publishes an academic journal, the Siberian Law Review (former names: "Vestnik of the Omsk Law Institute", "Vestnik of the Omsk Law Academy"). Since December 1, 2015, it has been included in the list of peer-reviewed academic publications of the Higher Attestation Commission.

The scientific journal "Siberian Law Review" is indexed in the European Reference Index for the Humanities and the Social Sciences (ERIH PLUS) and the scientific electronic library "CyberLeninka".
