= Omsk Foreign Language Institute =

Omsk International Management and Foreign Language Institute (Russian: Омский институт международного менеджмента и иностранных языков), known as Omsk Foreign Language Institute (Омский институт иностранных языков) until 2009, is a higher education facility in Omsk, Russia, established in 1991.
