= Timeline of the COVID-19 pandemic in Russia (January–June 2020) =

Sequence of major events in ongoing COVID-19 viral pandemic in Russia

The following is the timeline of the COVID-19 pandemic in Russia for the first half of 2020.

== Timeline ==
=== January–February 2020 ===
On 24 January, the first testing systems were developed and deployed to laboratories around the country.

On 31 January, two cases were confirmed, one in Tyumen, another in Chita, Zabaykalsky Krai. Both were Chinese nationals, who have since recovered.

On 23 February, eight Russians from the cruise ship Diamond Princess were evacuated to Kazan, Tatarstan where they were hospitalised, including three confirmed cases. These cases were listed as occurring on international conveyance and not included in official Russian statistics by Rospotrebnadzor. These eight people, including the three patients who recovered, were discharged from hospital on 8 March.

Some of Russia's citizens abroad have been confirmed to be infected, on 28 February a Russian man tested positive in Azerbaijan after he had visited Iran. While some days later the Health ministry of the UAE announced that two Russians got the virus in the United Arab Emirates.

=== March 2020 ===
On 1 March, a woman escaped from the hospital in Sevastopol before being tested for the virus. She fled to Rostov-on-Don and is on the wanted list.

On 2 March, the first case of coronavirus in Moscow was confirmed. The patient was a young man who fell ill on 21 February while on holiday in Italy, and returned to Russia on 23 February, staying at his house in Moscow Oblast. He showed up with symptoms at a clinic on 27 February, and was then hospitalised in Moscow. He was reported to be recovered on 6 March.

On 5 March, the first case of coronavirus in Saint Petersburg was confirmed. The patient was an Italian student who returned to Russia from Italy on 29 February, was hospitalised on 2 March and recovered on 13 March.

On 6 March, six more cases were confirmed, with five of them being in Moscow and one of them being in Nizhny Novgorod. All of them were reported to be linked to Italy.

On 7 March, four cases were confirmed, three in Lipetsk and one in Saint Petersburg. All of them had returned from Italy.

On 8 March, three new cases in Belgorod, Moscow and Kaliningrad oblasts were confirmed, all of them had returned from Italy.

On 9 March, three cases in Moscow were confirmed, all of them coming from Italy.

On 11 March, eight new cases were confirmed, six in Moscow and two in Moscow Oblast, all were people coming from Italy.

On 12 March, six cases were confirmed, including four in Moscow, one in Kaliningrad Oblast and the first case in Krasnodar Krai. On the same day, two tourists who arrived from Moscow on 3 March were diagnosed with the disease in Israel.

On 13 March, 11 new cases were confirmed: five in Moscow, three in St. Petersburg, one in Leningrad Oblast, Moscow Oblast, and Perm Krai. All of the patients came from Italy, France, or Austria, except for one who got infected locally.

On 14 March, first two cases in Kemerovo Oblast were confirmed. Also, there were nine new cases in Moscow, one in Moscow Oblast, Saint Petersburg and Kaliningrad Oblast each.

On 15 March, four new cases were confirmed, including three in Moscow region and one in Tyumen. The patients had recently visited Spain, Italy, France and Switzerland.

On 16 March, 30 new cases were confirmed, bringing the total number of cases to 93. Deputy Prime Minister Tatyana Golikova announced that 7 cases were from contact with other patients while the other 86 were imported. 3 new cases were in Samara Oblast for the first time, with the first cases in Kirov Oblast and Komi Republic.

On 17 March, 21 more cases were confirmed; four in Moscow, two in Samara Oblast, Kaliningrad Oblast, Tver Oblast, one in Moscow Oblast, Krasnoyarsk Krai, Tambov Oblast, Kaluga Oblast, Nizhny Novgorod Oblast, Penza Oblast, Tatarstan, Khakassia, Sverdlovsk Oblast, Arkhangelsk Oblast, Yaroslavl Oblast.

On 18 March, 33 new cases were confirmed including 31 in Moscow, one new case in Novosibirsk Oblast and Tomsk Oblast each.

On 19 March, the first death of a patient with confirmed COVID-19 was reported in Moscow. A 79-year-old woman was first hospitalised on 13 March and transferred to a private clinic the next day. Upon confirmation of COVID-19 she was transferred to an intensive care ward in Moscow Infectious Hospital #2. She also suffered from type 2 diabetes, hypertension, coronary artery disease (and underwent coronary stenting), coronary and aortic atherosclerosis, chronic pulmonary hypertension, kidney stone disease, and cerebrovascular disease. However, pulmonary embolism was identified as the direct cause of her death, she had no pathological changes in lungs, and her death was not officially counted as caused by coronavirus. The victim was identified in the media as Valentina Zubareva, professor at the Gubkin University, she had contracted the disease in Russia. 52 new cases were also confirmed in 23 regions including first cases in Chuvashia, Yakutia, Khabarovsk Krai, Ivanovo, Murmansk, Orenburg, Ryazan, Saratov, Tula, Voronezh oblasts, and Khanty-Mansi Autonomous Okrug, bringing the total number to 199.

On 20 March, 54 new cases were confirmed, including 33 in Moscow, 6 in Yakutia, 4 in Saint Petersburg, 4 in Samara Oblast, 2 in Kirov Oblast, 2 in Novosibirsk Oblast, 1 in Moscow Oblast, 1 in Tyumen Oblast, and the first case in Ulyanovsk Oblast.

On 21 March, 53 new cases were confirmed in 18 federal subjects, including first cases in Kabardino-Balkaria (2 cases), Stavropol Krai, Chelyabinsk Oblast, Kurgan Oblast, and disputed Republic of Crimea (1 case each).

On 22 March, 61 new cases were confirmed, including 54 in Moscow, 2 in Kirov Oblast, 1 case in Arkhangelsk Oblast, first cases in Udmurtia (2 cases), Bryansk Oblast, and Novgorod Oblast (1 case each).

On 23 March, 71 new cases were confirmed, all of them in Moscow.

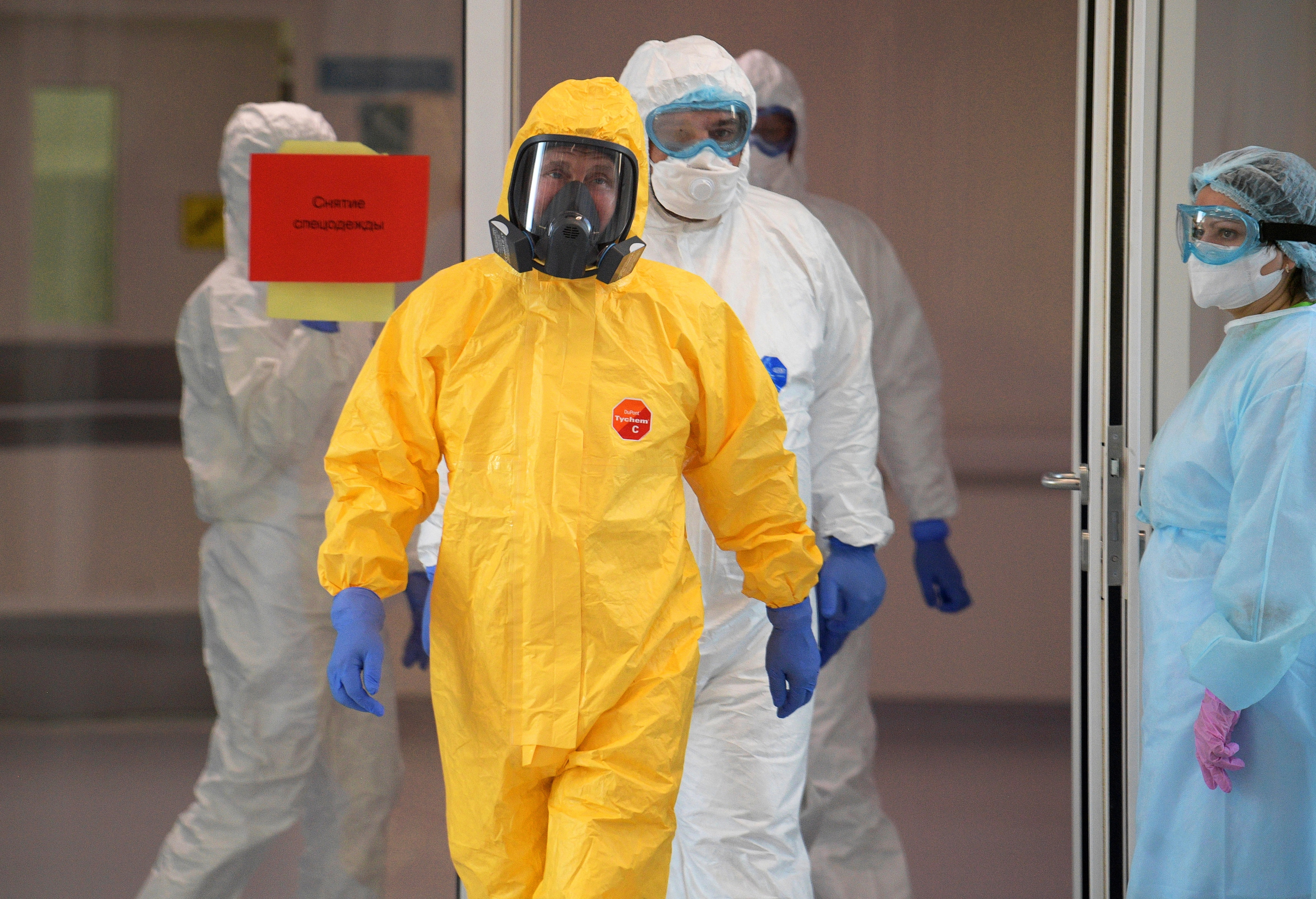
President Putin visits coronavirus patients at the City Clinical Hospital No. 40 in Moscow on 24 March.

On 24 March, 57 new cases were confirmed, including first cases in Primorsky Krai, Oryol Oblast, the Chechen Republic, Volgograd Oblast and Bashkortostan.

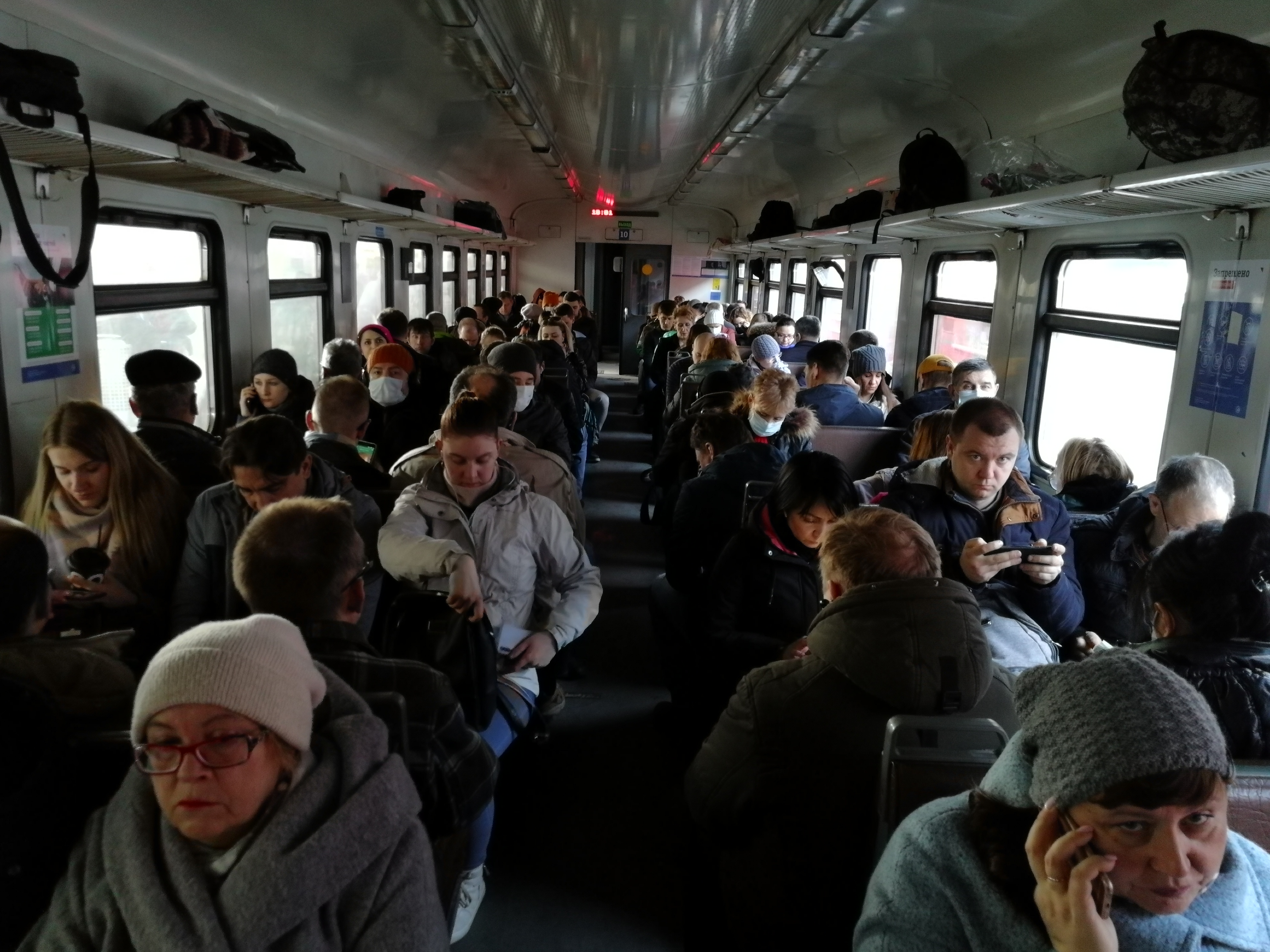
People at Yaroslavsky suburban railway line, 25 March

On 25 March, 163 new cases were confirmed, 120 of them in Moscow, with first cases in Pskov Oblast and Rostov Oblast. 2 deaths were also later reported and confirmed in Moscow. The patients were 73 and 88 years old and had been tested positive for the coronavirus.

On 26 March, 182 new cases were confirmed, 136 of them in Moscow, with first cases in Buryatia. According to a source in the hospital and an official report to the prosecutor office, an 83-year-old woman (a patient of a surgeon who got sick earlier, see 31 March) died in Syktyvkar of COVID-19, the death was covered up by the local authorities and not included in the official count. An official working under the chief of staff of the prime minister also tested positive for the coronavirus that day. The government also ordered the civil aviation authority to suspend all regular and charter flights to and from the country from 27 March.

On 27 March, 196 new cases were confirmed, 157 of them in Moscow, bringing the total number of confirmed cases to 1,036. The first cases in Mordovia and Dagestan were confirmed. An additional death in Moscow, a 70-year-old woman with pre-existing conditions who tested positive for coronavirus, was also confirmed. On the same day, the Kremlin confirmed that an employee of the presidential administration tested positive for the coronavirus, saying that the official had no contact with the president. Russian singer Lev Leshchenko was also confirmed to have tested positive for the virus. Later in the day, the 4th death was reported, a 56-year-old woman with one lung due to cancer, also in Moscow.

On 28 March, the fifth patient died in Orenburg, the first death outside of Moscow. The 57-year-old man from Buzuluk, Orenburg Oblast had travelled in France, Spain and Turkey in March. He had a chronic pathology. 228 new cases were confirmed, 114 of them in Moscow, bringing the total number of cases to 1,264. First cases were confirmed in Adygea, Kostroma, Sakhalin and Smolensk oblasts. Later that day, two deaths were reported in Saint Petersburg and Moscow. That day, the government announced that the border would be shut on 30 March, with all border crossings closed in order to curb the virus. International flights were already grounded.

On 29 March, 270 new cases were confirmed, 197 of them in Moscow, bringing the total number in the city to 1,014 and in the country to 1,534. Mayor of Moscow Sergey Sobyanin later in the day announced that the city would be on lockdown starting the next day. Irkutsk Oblast, Amur Oblast and Omsk Oblast all had their first confirmed cases. The total number of confirmed deaths reached 8.

On 30 March, 302 new cases were confirmed, including 212 in Moscow, bringing the total number to 1,836. The first cases were found in Kalmykia, Mari El, Altai Krai, Vladimir Oblast, and Vologda Oblast. The number of deaths rose to 9. Lockdowns were also announced in numerous other federal subjects, with many more announcing similar restrictions over the next few days.

On 31 March, 500 new cases were confirmed, 387 of them in Moscow and 48 of them in St. Petersburg, bringing the total number of confirmed cases to 2,337 in the 7th consecutive one-day record. First cases in Magadan Oblast and Astrakhan Oblast were confirmed that day. The number of confirmed deaths almost doubled from 9 the previous day to 17. The medical director of Moscow's main coronavirus hospital in Kommunarka, Denis Protsenko, was also reported to have tested positive for the coronavirus. A 61-year-old female, manager of the Syktyvkar hospital, which became a focus of the disease after a surgeon got sick on 16 March, died of COVID-19, but again, as with the death of a patient of the hospital surgical department on 26 March (see above), the death was not included in the official statistic even despite the pathology lab officially confirmed the diagnosis to the local media.

=== April 2020 ===
On 1 April, 440 new cases were confirmed, with 267 of them in Moscow, bringing the total number of confirmed cases to 2,777. The first cases were confirmed in Kursk Oblast and North Ossetia. The number of confirmed deaths rose by 7 to 24. President Putin also signed legislation imposing severe punishments for those convicted of spreading false information about the coronavirus and breaking quarantine rules. Kremlin spokesman Dmitry Peskov told reporters that President Putin is practising social-distancing and holding meetings remotely. It was also reported by Kommersant that several regions had limited the sales of alcohol, including Khakassia, Karelia and Bashkortostan, with some areas in Yakutia including Yakutsk completely banning the sale of alcohol.

On 2 April, 771 new cases were confirmed, bringing the total number of confirmed cases to 3,548. The number of confirmed deaths rose by 8 to 30.

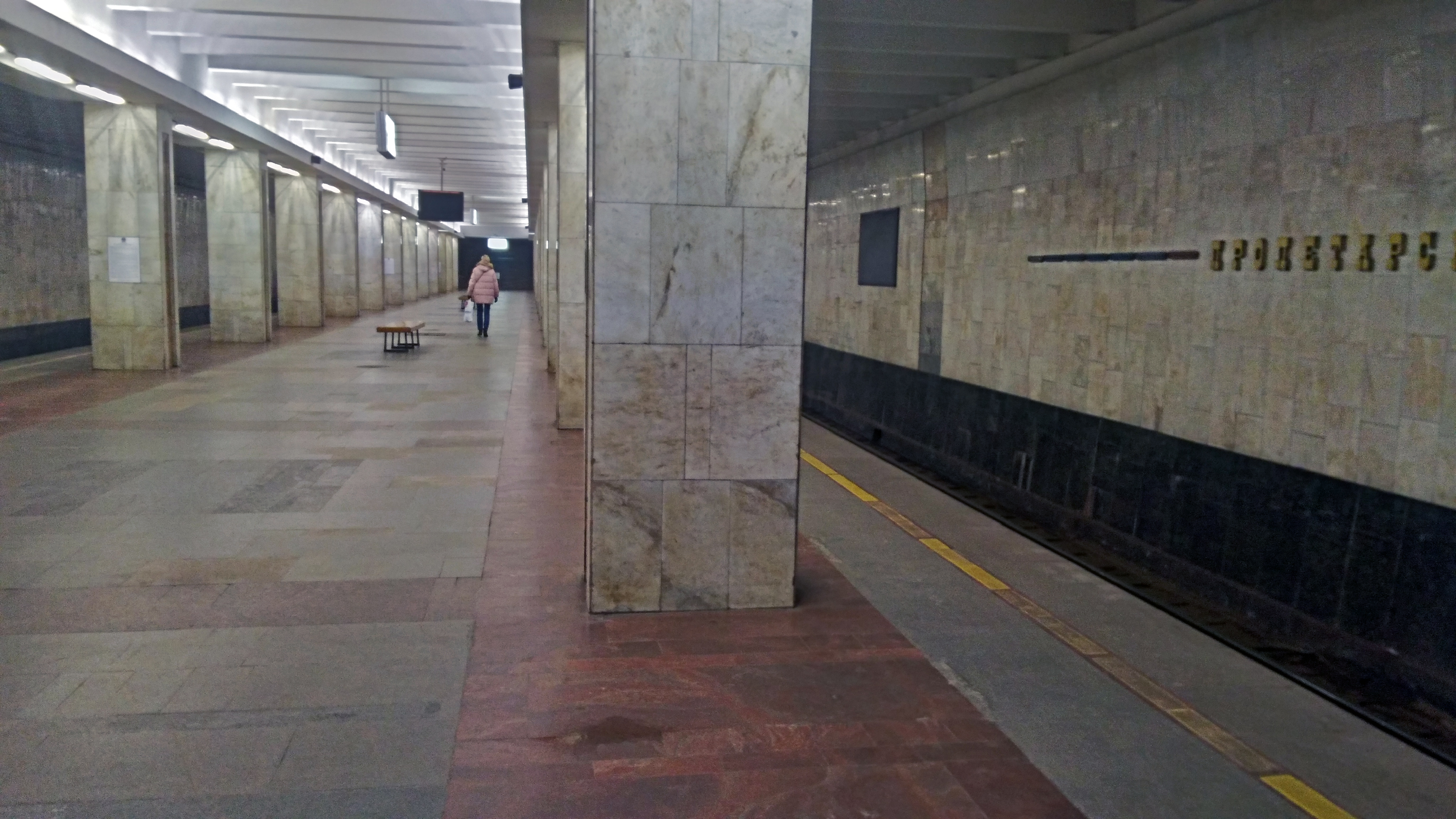
Empty Proletarskaya station of the Nizhny Novgorod metro during the quarantine period.

On 3 April, 601 new cases were confirmed, including the first cases in Ingushetia and the Jewish Autonomous Oblast, bringing the total number of confirmed cases to 4,149. The number of confirmed deaths rose by 4 to 34.

On 4 April, 582 new cases were confirmed, bringing the total to 4,731, with the number of confirmed deaths reaching 43.

On 5 April, 658 new cases were confirmed, bringing the total to 5,389, with the first two cases being confirmed in Kamchatka Krai. Confirmed deaths rose to 45.

On 6 April, 954 new cases were confirmed, bringing the total to 6,343, with the first two cases being confirmed in the Republic of Karelia. Confirmed deaths rose to 47.

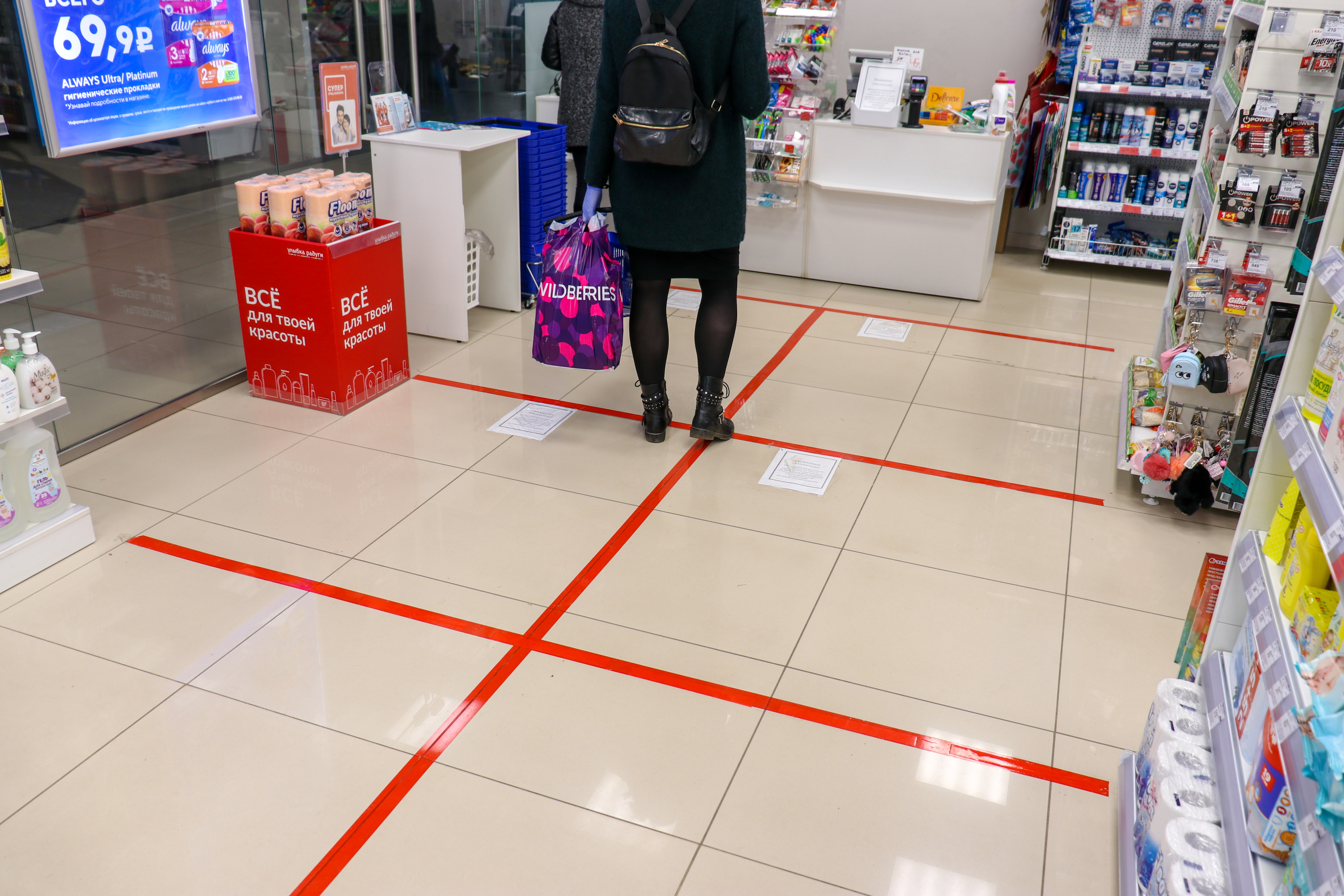
Social distancing measures at a store in Moscow.

On 7 April, 1,154 new cases were confirmed, bringing the total to 7,497, with the first three cases being confirmed in Karachay-Cherkessia. Confirmed deaths rose to 58. Moscow City Duma deputy Mikhail Timonov was reported to have tested positive for the virus.

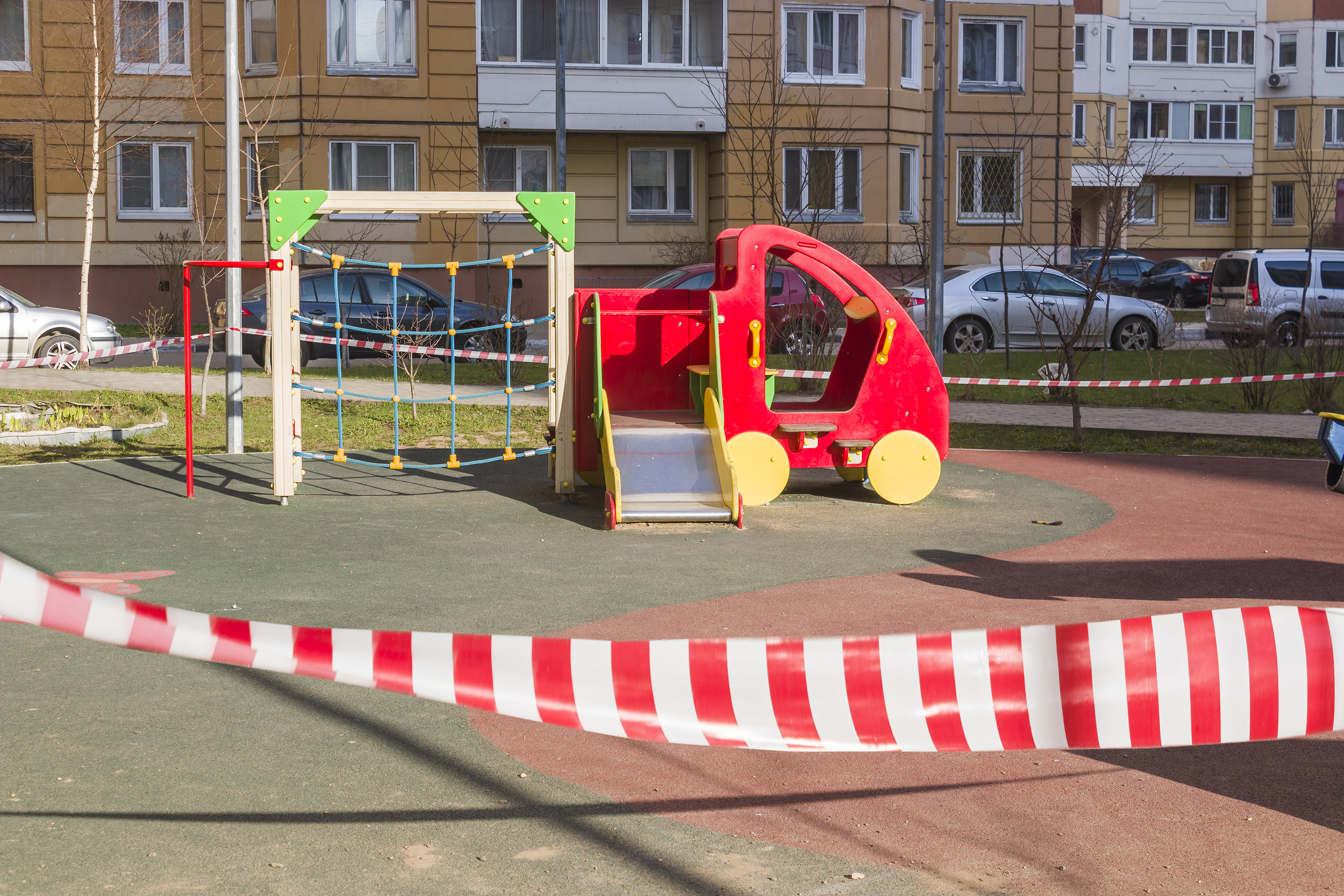
Playground closed for quarantine, 7 April 2020.

On 8 April, 1,175 new cases were confirmed, bringing the total to 8,672. Confirmed deaths rose to 63.

On 9 April, 1,459 new cases were confirmed, bringing the total to 10,131. Confirmed deaths rose to 76. It was also announced in Moscow that all patients with pneumonia would be regarded as potentially having coronavirus. That same day, the health minister of the Komi Republic, Dmitry Berezin, confirmed his resignation. The republic became one of the country's coronavirus hotspots.

On 10 April, 1,786 new cases were confirmed, bringing the total number to 11,917, with the first six cases being confirmed in Tuva.

On 11 April, 1,667 new cases were confirmed, bringing the total number to 13,584. Confirmed deaths rose to 106. Moscow's mayor, Sobyanin, signed a decree introducing a digital pass system to enforce the coronavirus lockdown, in which residents would require such a permit to travel around the city and Moscow Oblast using personal and public transport, with different types of passes including travelling to work, visiting hospitals and clinics, and private trips. Such permits would become mandatory on 15 April.

On 12 April, 2,186 new cases were confirmed, bringing the total number to 15,770. Confirmed deaths rose to 130.

On 13 April, 2,558 new cases were confirmed, bringing the total number to 18,328. Confirmed deaths rose to 148.

On 14 April, 2,774 new cases were confirmed, bringing the total number to 21,102. Confirmed deaths rose to 170. That same day, Moscow's health department warned that the city could face a shortage of hospital beds within the next 2 to 3 weeks. Another 24 hospitals would be planned to be converted to accommodate coronavirus patients to bring the total number of hospital beds to 21,000.

On 15 April, 3,388 new cases were confirmed, bringing the total number to 24,490. The first cases were recorded in Chukotka and Nenets autonomous okrugs. Confirmed deaths rose to 198.

On 16 April, 3,448 new cases were confirmed, bringing the total number to 27,938. Confirmed deaths rose to 232. That same day, local media reported that 1/3 of all coronavirus infections in Leningrad Oblast were concentrated in one hostel housing migrant workers involved in the construction of a nearby IKEA-owned shopping mall. Local authorities called the hostel illegal and opened a criminal probe. The region's governor, Aleksandr Drozdenko, ordered an inspection of all hostels as a result. Russia's largest technology company, Yandex, also announced the launch of the delivery of coronavirus tests for elderly Muscovites, with the first 10,000 tests being delivered for free. It also said that the service would be later expanded to include all age-groups and other regions, and that it may launch the delivery of antibody tests in the future. Moscow authorities also announced that all cases of acute respiratory infections would be suspected of being coronavirus cases.

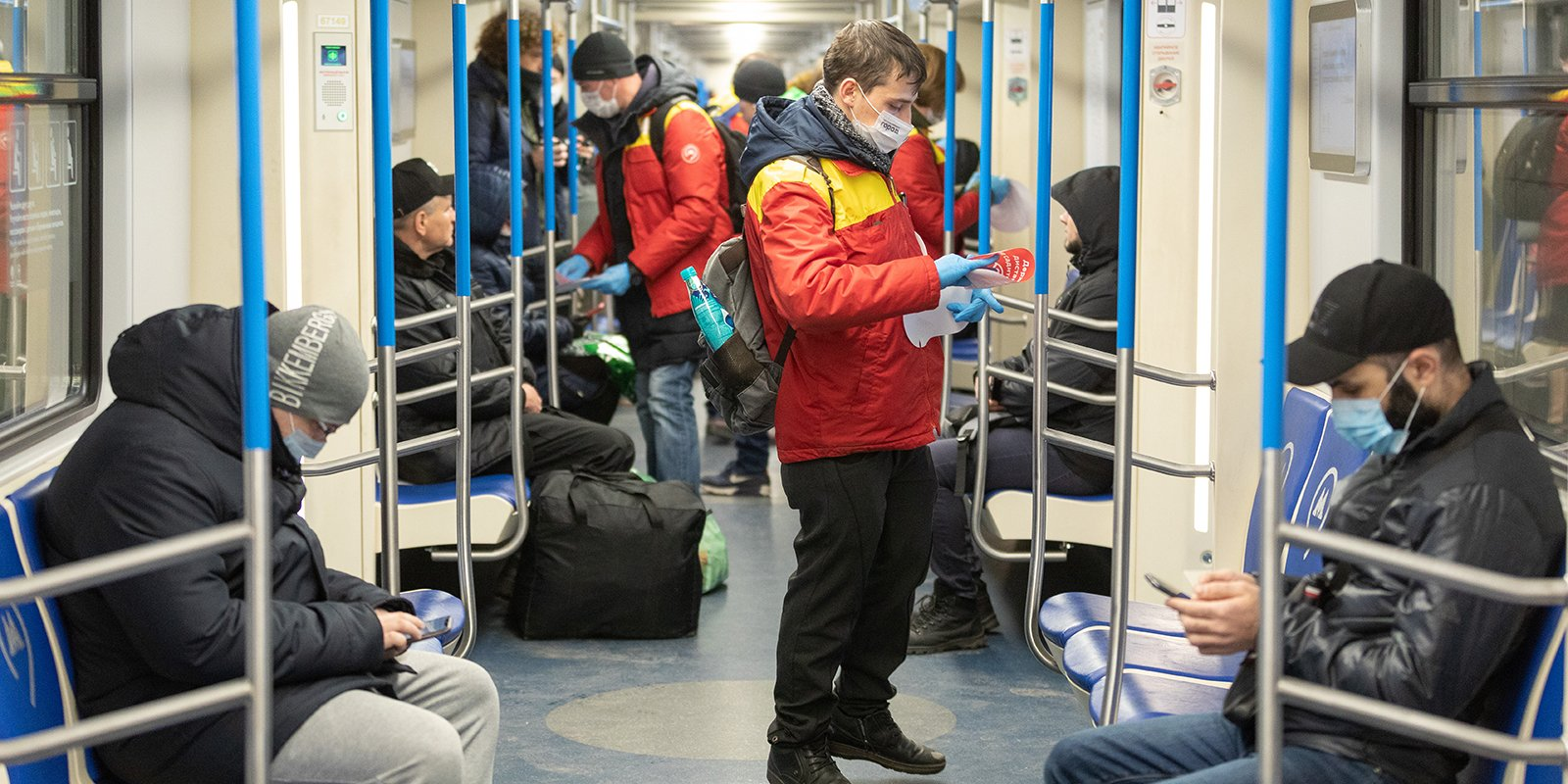
People in Moscow wearing face masks

On 17 April, 4,070 new cases were confirmed, bringing the total number to 32,008. The first case was confirmed in the last federal subject, the Altai Republic. Confirmed deaths rose to 273. That same day, the head of the consumer protection watchdog Rospotrebnadzor said that around half of the cases in Russia were asymptomatic.

On 18 April, 4,785 new cases were confirmed, bringing the total number to 36,793. Confirmed deaths rose to 313. That day, the head of Moscow's health department said that around 60% of cases in the city were asymptomatic, compared to around 40% a week ago.

On 19 April, 6,060 new cases were confirmed, bringing the total number to 42,853. Confirmed deaths rose to 361. That same day, it was reported that in Arkhangelsk Oblast, more than 70 patients and employees at a psychiatric hospital tested positive for coronavirus.

On 20 April, 4,268 new cases were confirmed, bringing the total number to 47,121. Confirmed deaths rose to 405. In Vladikavkaz, several hundred demonstrators protested in a rally against the self-isolation regime, some of whom were detained by police. The Kremlin's spokesman, Dmitry Peskov, called the rally illegal and said that it could have negative consequences due to the lack of social distancing. That same day, Yandex announced that it would make its home coronavirus testing service free of charge for all residents of Moscow and nearby of all ages and will be available to other regions in the future. Previously, it announced the launch of the service on 16 April.

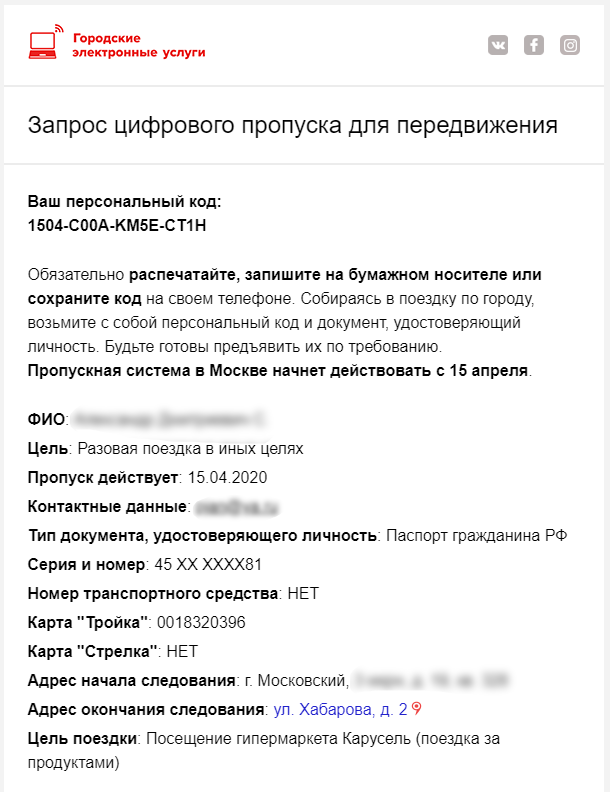
Example of digital pass in Moscow which was required from 15 April to enforce the lockdown.

On 21 April, 5,642 new cases were confirmed, bringing the total number to 52,763. Confirmed deaths rose to 456. That same day, it was reported that 56-year-old Maxim Starinsky became the first doctor to die from coronavirus complications in Russia, having died the previous day in Kommunarka hospital after working at Veterans Hospital No.3 in Moscow. According to a colleague, 64 medical workers at the hospital tested positive for the virus last week, two of whom are in intensive care. A new hospital in Moscow that was built in a month to treat coronavirus patients began accepting patients that same day when the number of confirmed cases in Moscow reached 29,433 with 233 deaths. Moscow Mayor Sergey Sobyanin also signed an order saying that residents with symptoms of acute respiratory illnesses should self-isolate at home.

On 22 April, 5,236 new cases were confirmed, bringing the total number to 57,999. Confirmed deaths rose to 513. That day, the communications ministry said the platform for issuing digital passes will be implemented in 21 federal subjects after they applied for them.

On 23 April, 4,774 new cases were confirmed, bringing the total number to 62,773. Confirmed deaths rose to 555. The interior ministry also announced that foreign nationals won't be deported nor have their documents cancelled amid the pandemic.

On 24 April, 5,849 new cases were confirmed, bringing the total number to 68,622. Confirmed deaths rose to 615. That day, Moscow deputy mayor for social development Anastasia Rakova said that more than 40% of the city's health system is being used in the fight against the virus. The mayor of the city also said that he asked the Health Ministry and Education Ministry to prepare and send medical students to help treat patients. That day, the governor of Kaliningrad Oblast, Anton Alikhanov, said that the region would ease its lockdown starting on 29 April. Non-food stores were planned to re-open that day with others such as salons and hairdressers re-opening on 4 May, with all residents required to practise social distancing and wear face-masks. The lockdown was later extended to 12 May instead.

On 25 April, 5,966 new cases were confirmed, bringing the total number to 74,588. Confirmed deaths rose to 681. That day, it was reported that doctors had published and were updating a public list of colleagues who had died from the virus, with one doctor saying it was due to mistrust of official statistics, which had more than 60 names by the next day. It was also reported that day that two deputies of the Communist Party, Leonid Kalashnikov and Dmitry Novikov, had tested positive for the virus with both being treated in hospital. They are the first members of the State Duma to become infected.

On 26 April, 6,361 new cases were confirmed, bringing the total number to 80,949. Confirmed deaths rose to 747. That day, the Ministry of Defence said that 874 troops had tested positive for the virus so far.

On 27 April, 6,198 new cases were confirmed, bringing the total number to 87,147. Confirmed deaths rose to 794. The governor of Nizhny Novgorod Oblast, Gleb Nikitin, said that entry to the region would be banned unless one has an emergency permit or proof of residence there.

On 28 April, 6,411 new cases were confirmed, bringing the total number to 93,558. Confirmed deaths rose to 867. That day, President Putin extended the national non-working period from 30 April to 11 May. In Moscow, it was reported that the lockdown had been extended to 13 May. Russia's Federal Penitentiary Service also announced that 271 workers and 40 inmates have tested positive for the virus nationwide. Prime Minister Mikhail Mishustin also instructed Rospotrebnadzor to draft a strategy by 29 April to ease quarantine restrictions.

On 29 April, 5,841 new cases were confirmed, bringing the total number to 99,399. Confirmed deaths rose to 972. Early that day, Moscow Mayor Sergey Sobyanin said on social media that the city would start constructing temporary hospitals that would have a total of 10,000 hospital beds for coronavirus patients. Russia also indefinitely extended its entry ban for foreigners, which was originally set until 1 May, with Prime Minister Mishustin saying that the ban will be lifted when the coronavirus situation improves.

On 30 April, 7,099 new cases were confirmed, bringing the total number to 106,498. Confirmed deaths rose to 1,073. That day, Prime Minister Mishustin announced that he himself had tested positive for the virus. President Putin as a result signed an executive order to appoint First Deputy Prime Minister Andrey Belousov as Acting Prime Minister while Mishustin recovers. Moscow Oblast's governor, Andrey Vorobyov, also said that residents will soon be required to wear face-masks in public areas. The same day, the National Guard said that 339 members were infected. Moscow's mayor, Sobyanin, said that half of the city's coronavirus patients in critical condition tested negative.

=== May 2020 ===
On 1 May, 7,933 new cases were confirmed, bringing the total number to 114,431. Confirmed deaths rose to 1,169. The head of Rospotrebnadzor, Anna Popova, said that it was possible that restrictions could be tightened after the May holidays if residents don't follow existing rules. Previously, she said that the phasing out of restrictions could start after the holidays if residents completely follow rules. It was also reported that Minister of Construction, Housing and Utilities, Vladimir Yakushev, and his deputy Dmitry Volkov were hospitalised after testing positive for the virus.

On 2 May, 9,623 new cases were confirmed, bringing the total number to 124,054. Confirmed deaths rose to 1,222. Mayor of Moscow Sergey Sobyanin said that about 2% of Moscow's population (around 250,000) had coronavirus according to screening tests, while saying that the peak has not been reached yet. The French-headquartered home improvement and gardening retailer Leroy Merlin had most of its stores closed by local authorities as there were crowds of people in the stores despite requests from the authorities to self-isolate. It was also confirmed that day that over 10,000 workers at the Chayanda oil field in Yakutia were tested for the virus, with over 3,000 testing positive.

On 3 May, 10,633 new cases were confirmed, bringing the total number to 134,687. Confirmed deaths rose to 1,280. That day, the National Guard said that some of its units are using drones and a helicopter to enforce self-isolation and social distancing rules in Moscow and Moscow Oblast during the May holidays, by sending information to law enforcement on the ground about violations. It was also reported that the government had lifted its ban on exporting medical masks and respirators, with Minister of Trade and Industry Denis Manturov saying that there was no shortage of masks and sanitary products in pharmacies.

On 4 May, 10,581 new cases were confirmed, bringing the total number to 145,268. Confirmed deaths rose to 1,356. It was confirmed that day that the speaker of Leningrad Oblast's parliament, Sergei Bebenin, had tested positive for the virus. Kremlin spokesman Dmitry Peskov also said that President Putin would be presented with a list of recommendations on removing restrictions in a meeting on 6 May. The same day, Russian and foreign media outlets reported that a 98-year-old World War II (or Great Patriotic War) veteran, Zinaida Korneva, was raising money and had raised over 1.5 million rubles by that day to help Russian doctors affected by the pandemic and their families. She found out about Tom Moore's (or "Captain Tom") initiative in the United Kingdom, sending him a video message on YouTube on 30 April and announced her own fundraising initiative. With the help of her daughter, she began recording daily videos talking about her stories from the war. Meduza reported that her family and British journalists are trying to organise a phone call between Korneva and Moore.

On 5 May, 10,102 new cases were confirmed, bringing the total number to 155,370. Confirmed deaths rose to 1,451. Russia's Union of Journalists said that 55 journalists in the world have died from the virus and in Russia, 3 had died with more than 100 ill.

On 6 May, 10,559 new cases were confirmed, bringing the total number to 165,929. Confirmed deaths rose to 1,537. It was also reported that day that the Minister of Culture, Olga Lyubimova, tested positive for the virus. She became the third Cabinet member to test positive. Also that day, the Prosecutor General's Office said in a statement that it requested Roskomnadzor to block access to online videos and materials claiming that the virus is man-made. It said that "neither the World Health Organization nor the Russian government or other official authorities have confirmed information about the artificial manufacture of coronavirus" and dismissed ads for drugs which claim to treat coronavirus. Moscow's coronavirus task force also said that over 1 million tests have been conducted in the city. It was also reported that the hundreds of thousands of rapid antibody tests that were purchased by Moscow's authorities were Chinese-made instead rather than Dutch-made as advertised, and are far less accurate than claimed.

On 7 May, 11,231 new cases were confirmed, bringing the total number to 177,160. Confirmed deaths rose to 1,625. Moscow's mayor, Sobyanin, said that its lockdown has been extended to 31 May and that from 12 May, residents will be required to wear face masks and gloves in public transport and public places. Leonid Fedun, co-founder of Lukoil and owner of Spartak Moscow, was hospitalised with the virus.

On 8 May, 10,699 new cases were confirmed, bringing the total number to 187,859. Confirmed deaths rose to 1,723. The head of Rospotrebnadzor, Anna Popova, said that the lockdown could remain until a vaccine is developed or until the pandemic ends.

On 9 May, 10,817 new cases were confirmed, bringing the total number to 198,678. Confirmed deaths rose to 1,827. The city of St. Petersburg also extended its lockdown to 31 May and will require residents to wear masks and gloves from 12 May. Also that day, a fire broke out at a Moscow hospital treating coronavirus patients, causing an evacuation and killing 1. With the 2020 Moscow Victory Day Parade postponed, celebrations marking the 75th anniversary of the surrender of Nazi Germany were reduced. An air show took place in Moscow instead and President Putin laid flowers at the Eternal Flame outside the Kremlin. Authorities also urged citizens to stay at home instead.

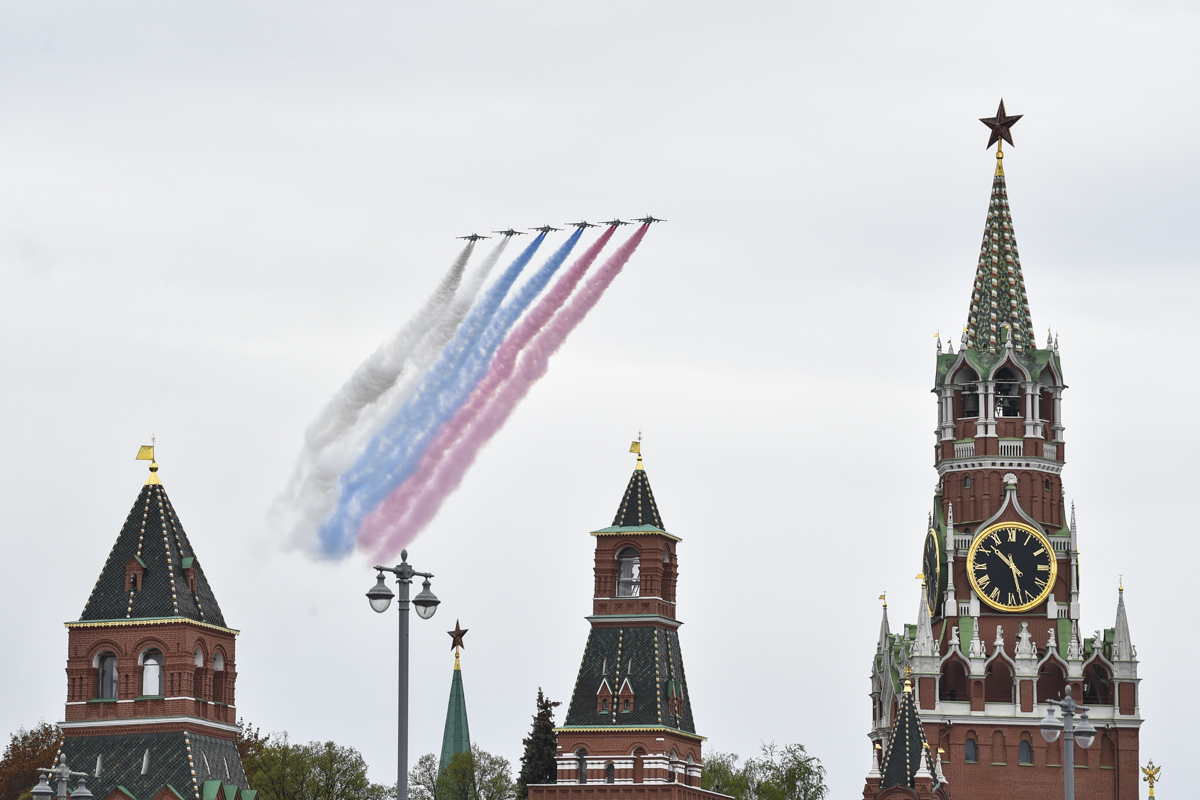
Victory Day was marked with an airshow as the parade was postponed.

On 10 May, 11,012 new cases were confirmed, bringing the total number to 209,688. Confirmed deaths rose to 1,915. The World Health Organization's representative to Russia, Melita Vujnovic, said that day that Russia may have reached the plateau for the virus. The Russian Football Union also said that it expects the resumption of the Russian Premier League on June 21 or 28, with there being a high chance of resumption.

On 11 May, 11,656 new cases were confirmed, bringing the total number to 221,344. Confirmed deaths rose to 2,009. That day, President Putin announced the end of the national non-working period on 12 May. He also announced additional support measures including bonuses for doctors, subsidies for companies and payments to families with children. He also said that regional leaders can choose to keep restrictions. Preliminary data from Moscow's civil registry office also showed that around 20% more deaths were recorded in April compared to the average for the past decade. 11,846 deaths were recorded compared to the average of 9,866. The investigative website, Proekt, reported that at least 300 people, including cadets and officers, became infected with the virus after participating in rehearsals for the Victory Day parade. Also that day, official data also said that the reproduction rate of the virus in Moscow fell from 1.02 the previous day to 0.96 while across Russia, the value was 1.04.

On 12 May, 10,899 new cases were confirmed, bringing the total number to 232,243. Confirmed deaths rose to 2,116. That day, Kremlin spokesman Dmitry Peskov confirmed that he tested positive for the virus. He said that he last met President Putin in person over a month ago. Also, according to Kommersant, pharmacies in Russia are facing shortages of thermometers. The same day, a fire broke out at St. Georgy's Hospital in St. Petersburg where it has been treating coronavirus patients. The cause was a ventilator short-circuiting. 5 patients with the virus who were connected to ventilators died. It was reported that the ventilator that caused the fire was manufactured by the same company which manufactured the ventilator that caused a fire in a Moscow hospital 3 days ago, killing 1.

On 13 May, 10,028 new cases were confirmed, bringing the total number to 242,271. Confirmed deaths rose to 2,212. That day, St. Petersburg's governor Alexander Beglov said that 1,465 medical workers have been infected with the virus since the epidemic began. State Duma deputy Oksana Pushkina also said that she tested positive for the virus. Also that day, the Federal Biomedical Agency said that Russia's oldest coronavirus patient, 100-year-old Pelageya Poyarkova, fully recovered. Moscow's Department of Health also refuted media reports that the Moscow Government is understating coronavirus deaths, saying that it openly publishes mortality data. It also said that over 60% of deaths among those with the virus had a different cause of death, which are not counted as COVID-19 deaths. It was also reported that low-cost airline Pobeda will resume domestic flights on 1 June. Russian regulators also suspended the use of Aventa-M ventilators which were blamed for causing two fires in hospitals - one in St. Petersburg that killed 5 and one in Moscow that killed 1. Ventilators of the same model were also sent to the United States, with the U.S. Federal Emergency Management Agency (FEMA) saying that the ventilators haven't been deployed and that states will return the ventilators to FEMA. The Health Ministry also said that day that it was necessary to increase the legal drinking age from 18 to 21 due to an increase in alcohol-related deaths during the epidemic in Russia - there have been a number attempts in the last few years to raise the drinking age.

On 14 May, 9,974 new cases were confirmed, bringing the total number to 252,245. Confirmed deaths rose to 2,305. The same day, President Putin said that Education and Science Minister Valery Falkov became infected with the virus. TASS news agency reported that the virus reproduction rate in Russia fell below 1 for the first time, from 1.01 the previous day to 0.97. In Moscow, it fell from 0.91 the previous day to 0.88.

On 15 May, 10,598 new cases were confirmed, bringing the total number to 262,843. Confirmed deaths rose to 2,418. The Russian Premier League was announced to resume on 21 June by the Russian Football Union, with matches being held without spectators. They were suspended since 17 March. Yandex also announced the end of its free coronavirus testing program. 20,000 people were tested for free since the program began on 20 April. It said that mass testing is now possible without its help and as a result, will focus on other initiatives such as supporting doctors, social workers and charities.

On 16 May, 9,200 new cases were confirmed, bringing the total number to 272,043. Confirmed deaths rose to 2,537.

On 17 May, 9,709 new cases were confirmed, bringing the total number to 281,752. Confirmed deaths rose to 2,631. U.S. Secretary of State Mike Pompeo said that day that aid from the United States, including testing equipment and ventilators, was "on its way" to Russia. It was reported that 200 American-made ventilators were planned to be sent to Russia in the next week. Chechnya's leader, Ramzan Kadyrov was also reported to have demanded the firings of medical staff who complained about personal protective equipment shortages and another worker who mistakenly reported the death of a colleague. Dagestan's health minister, Dzhamaludin Gadzhiibragimov, also said that day that 40 health workers had died since the outbreak began, while official statistics said that 27 people had died in the region. He also said that 657 patients had died of community-acquired pneumonia, with symptoms of COVID-19 but no positive test results. Dagestan's health minister also said that 13,697 people contracted the virus or community-acquired pneumonia. The health ministry also later said that the deaths of doctors were also caused by other diseases. Rospotrebnadzor head, Anna Popova, also said that day that the coronavirus situation in Russia has been stabilising.

On 18 May, 8,926 new cases were confirmed, bringing the total number to 290,678. Confirmed deaths rose to 2,722. That day, President Putin also noted the "difficult" situation in Dagestan, as local officials had described it as "catastrophic" - the region's top cleric, Ahmad Afandi Abdulaev, called the situation dire; he pleaded to the Kremlin for assistance. The state channel, Rossiya 24, reported that 3% of families in the region give consent to autopsies which may distort statistics. Professional mixed martial artist Khabib Nurmagomedov also urged residents of his native republic, Dagestan, to comply with the requirements of doctors and celebrate the holiday of Uraza-Bayram at home. He also confirmed that his father was infected with the virus and that his situation was serious. Prime Minister Mishustin said that day that 27 regions are ready to ease restrictions. Russian Health Minister, Mikhail Murashko, also said that day that clinical trials of a vaccine were planned in a month. He said that "Russia manufactures more than 20 testing systems. It is developing full-cycle medicines, which are ready for clinical use. Serious work is being done to develop vaccines for preventive immunisation against the disease. It is planned to begin their clinical trials in a month". Saratov Oblast reinstated its ban on walks and outdoor activities a week after easing restrictions due to an increase in cases.

On 19 May, 9,273 new cases were confirmed, bringing the total number to 299,941. Confirmed deaths rose to 2,837. Prime Minister Mishustin resumed his official duties after announcing he tested positive for the virus on 30 April.

On 20 May, 8,764 new cases were confirmed, bringing the total number to 308,705. Confirmed deaths rose to 2,972. Moscow Mayor Sobyanin said that the number of deaths is expected to be significantly higher than in April.

On 21 May, 8,849 new cases were confirmed, bringing the total number to 317,554. Confirmed deaths rose to 3,099. That day, Interfax news agency reported that Chechnya's leader, Ramzan Kadyrov, was suspected of having the virus and was under the supervision of doctors in Moscow. The U.S. Associated Press news agency also analysed official statements and news reports in more than 70 regions which show that at least 9,479 medical workers have been infected in the past month and that more than 70 died. Medical workers have put the death toll higher in a list with more than 250 names. The news agency also reported complaints of protective equipment shortages by medical workers, which officials have insisted are isolated rather than widespread. Moscow's mayor, Sobyanin, also said that the city's public registry services will re-open and that car-sharing will resume on 25 May, while all other restrictions would remain.

On 22 May, 8,894 new cases were confirmed, bringing the total number to 326,448. Confirmed deaths rose to 3,249. President Putin said in a televised video-conference with government officials and health experts that the outbreak was stabilising however warned that another outbreak could hit the country later in the year during autumn and that preparations should be made. It was also reported that in the Moscow region, violators of the self-isolation regime could face up to 100 hours of community service in hospitals as punishment. It was also reported that a vaccine for the virus was successfully tested on humans at the Gamaleya Centre for Epidemiology and Microbiology.

On 23 May, 9,434 new cases were confirmed, bringing the total number to 335,882. Confirmed deaths rose to 3,388. The Gamaleya Centre for Epidemiology and Microbiology said that it expects to start clinical testing of its coronavirus vaccine in early June. The Defence Ministry said that 1,457 servicemen had tested positive for the virus, with recoveries including 1,204 servicemen, 1,542 cadets, 308 students of pre-universities and 178 civilian personnel. Most of those who were infected did not show symptoms.

On 24 May, 8,599 new cases were confirmed, bringing the total number to 344,481. Confirmed deaths rose to 3,541.

On 25 May, 8,946 new cases were confirmed, bringing the total number to 353,427. Confirmed deaths rose to 3,633. Prime Minister Mishustin advised citizens to not plan vacations abroad, saying that it was important to reduce the risk of re-importing cases. The Federal Penitentiary Service also reported that 980 employees and 238 inmates were infected with the virus. The Defence Ministry said that 1,522 servicemen had tested positive for the virus, with 1,340 having recovered.

On 26 May, 8,915 new cases were confirmed, bringing the total number to 362,342. Confirmed deaths rose to 3,807. President Putin announced that the 2020 Victory Day Parade would be held on 24 June, coinciding with the Moscow Victory Parade of 1945. The Vector Institute said that it plans to start clinical trials of its coronavirus vaccine in late June. Britain's embassy in Moscow said that British Prime Minister Boris Johnson invited President Putin to the virtual Global Vaccine Summit 2020 which is being held by the British government on 4 June.

On 27 May, 8,338 new cases were confirmed, bringing the total number to 370,680. Confirmed deaths rose to 3,968. Moscow's mayor, Sobyanin, announced that some restrictions would be lifted on 1 June. Non-food shops would re-open and some service sector businesses that do not require prolonged contact between people would be re-opened. He also said that residents would be able to go outside for walks and sport, and that parks and green areas except Zaryadye Park would re-open. Park attractions, sports grounds and playgrounds would remain closed. A schedule system however would be in place to prevent everyone from going out at once. City bike rentals would be available to everyone and hospitals will begin a gradual return towards providing regular routine medical care. Rospotrebnadzor said that Moscow is ready to start lifting restrictions. Chechnya's leader, Ramzan Kadyrov said that day that he was healthy after media reports of suspicions of a coronavirus infection. The Health Ministry also said that day that asymptomatic cases would stop being counted.

On 28 May, 8,371 new cases were confirmed, bringing the total number to 379,051. Confirmed deaths rose to 4,142. Moscow's health department said that it revised the city's coronavirus death toll using a new methodology. The death toll was originally 636 for April, however it said in a statement that the revised death toll was 1,561, including 756 people diagnosed with the virus but were determined to have died of other causes and 169 people who tested negative but were suspected of having the virus. It said that the methodology would include "even controversial, questionable cases" however the city's death rate from the virus was considerably lower compared to other cities like London and New York. The new methodology so far had not been used to revise the official death toll for the city or the entire country. Also that day, Moscow's mayor Sobyanin said that restrictions would remain until a vaccine is developed.

On 29 May, 8,572 new cases were confirmed, bringing the total number to 387,623. Confirmed deaths rose to 4,374. Prime Minister Mishustin that day added the media sector to a list of industries that qualify for government support which include tax payment deferrals, interest-free loans, rental payments, soft loans, a moratorium on bankruptcy, grants and more.

On 30 May, 8,952 new cases were confirmed, bringing the total number to 396,575. Confirmed deaths rose to 4,555. Health Minister Mikhail Murashko said that vaccine tests were under way and that clinical trials were planned to begin in the next two weeks. He also said that volunteers had been chosen to take part in the trials. The Russian Direct Investment Fund said that the Health Ministry had approved Avifavir for the treatment of the virus. It also said that the drug was highly effective in treating patients in the first phase of its clinical trials.

On 31 May, 9,268 new cases were confirmed, bringing the total number to 405,842. Confirmed deaths rose to 4,693.

=== June 2020 ===
On 1 June, 9,035 new cases were confirmed, bringing the total number to 414,878. Confirmed deaths rose to 4,855. Reuters news agency reported that Russia would roll out its first approved drug to treat COVID-19 in the next week. It said that hospitals would be able to give the drug, Avifavir, to patients starting 11 June, according to the head of the Russian Direct Investment Fund. President Putin said that the 2020 Russian constitutional referendum was planned to be held on 1 July. A proposal to allow early voting from 25 June, after the planned Victory Day parade, was made by Ella Pamfilova, head of the Central Election Commission.

On 2 June, 8,863 new cases were confirmed, bringing the total number to 423,741. Confirmed deaths rose to 5,037. Prime Minister Mikhail Mishustin said that the government would launch a 5 trillion ruble ($73 billion) recovery plan in the next month to counteract the pandemic's economic impact. The program would last until the end of 2021 with the target of bringing the unemployment rate back to under 5% and economic growth of 2.5% a year. The Ministry of Defence said that it had selected fifty military personnel, including five women, who volunteered to test the safety and effectiveness of a vaccine. They will undergo preparations and examinations starting on 3 June.

On 3 June, 8,536 new cases were confirmed, bringing the total number to 432,277. Confirmed deaths rose to 5,215. That day, the city of St. Petersburg reported a 32% higher death rate in May compared to the previous year. The city government said that 6,427 death certificates were issued, compared to 4,875 the previous year. For the same month, the official coronavirus death toll was 171 people. Overall, the city has 17,069 confirmed cases and 240 confirmed deaths. 1 patient died in a St. Petersburg hospital that day after a fire.

On 4 June, 8,831 new cases were confirmed, bringing the total number to 441,108. Confirmed deaths rose to 5,384. Moscow's mayor, Sobyanin, said that most restrictions would be lifted by 1 July. He said a schedule for lifting restrictions may be published on 8 June. He also said that starting 1 June, 55% of shops closed due to the virus have reopened with the rest set to open in the next week, however he said that it was too early to open some facilities like gyms. A second batch of ventilators sent by the United States also landed that day by plane. It contained 150 ventilators, while the first batch, which had 50 ventilators, landed on 21 May.

On 5 June, 8,726 new cases were confirmed, bringing the total number to 449,834. Confirmed deaths rose to 5,528. Meduza reported that 3 regions would not be holding Victory Day parades and celebrations on 24 June due to the epidemic. Belgorod Oblast postponed celebrations to 12 July, Oryol Oblast has scheduled celebrations for 5 August and Perm Krai will possibly hold its parade on 3 September. The Central Bank of Russia said that it saw signs of continuing decline in economic activity.

On 6 June, 8,855 new cases were confirmed, bringing the total number to 458,689. Confirmed deaths rose to 5,725.

On 7 June, 8,984 new cases were confirmed, bringing the total number to 467,673. Confirmed deaths rose to 5,869. The Federal Air Transport Agency was reported to suggest resuming flights with 15 countries on 15 July. It planned to send its proposals to Rospotrebnadzor and the list of countries will be drawn up together by the Federal Air Transport Agency and the consumer rights watchdog.

On 8 June, 8,985 new cases were confirmed, bringing the total number to 476,658. Confirmed deaths rose to 5,971. Moscow's mayor, Sobyanin, said that the city would lift coronavirus restrictions. Self-isolation rules and travel permits would be waived on 9 June, with no more walking schedules. Residents would be able to freely travel around the city and visit public places. Places like beauty salons, hairdressers and veterinarian clinics would re-open, with other places like restaurants re-opening over the course of June. Residents are still required to wear face masks and gloves and are advised to maintain their distance from others. That day, Prime Minister Mishustin also announced the partial re-opening of the border for some travellers, saying that it would allow citizens to leave the country for work, studying, medical treatment or to take care of relatives. It would also allow foreign citizens to enter for medical treatment or those needing to care for relatives and family. The border was shut on 30 March. Prime Minister Mishustin said that the country was ready for the gradual opening of the holiday season. The Transport Ministry said that it was too early to set a date for resuming international flights.

On 9 June, 8,595 new cases were confirmed, bringing the total number to 485,253. Confirmed deaths rose to 6,141. Crimea's head, Sergey Aksyonov, said that restrictions on hosting tourists from other Russian regions would be lifted on 1 July.

On 10 June, 8,404 new cases were confirmed, bringing the total number to 493,657. Confirmed deaths rose to 6,358. Ekho Moskvy reported that approximately 15,700 people died in Moscow in May according to preliminary data, citing an unnamed source, an increase of about 57% compared to the average of the last 3 years. Moscow's mayor, Sobyanin, said that it would take about 2 months for Moscow to exit from all restrictions. Moscow's health department increased the city's coronavirus death toll from 1,895 to 5,260 for May. It said in a statement that "COVID-19 as a main or an accompanying cause of death was registered in 5,260 cases". It also said that the difference was due to changes made by the Health Ministry in the approach of counting deaths, saying that "new recommendations allowed us to improve the calculation of cases where COVID was the main cause of the death and of those where it became, with a high degree of probability, a catalyst...for other illnesses".

On 11 June, 8,779 new cases were confirmed, bringing the total number to 502,436. Confirmed deaths rose to 6,532. Russian Direct Investment Fund said in a statement that the first batch of Antivar drugs were delivered to hospitals. It said that as many as 60,000 courses of Avifavir will be delivered in June and that production could be increased to 2 million courses a year if necessary. The drug is produced by a joint venture of RDIF and ChemRar Group and is currently one of two registered drugs in the world for COVID-19. Kremlin Spokesman Dmitry Peskov said that there was nothing strange about Russia's data, responding to executive director of the WHO Health Emergencies Program Michael Ryan's description of Russia's mortality rate as "unusual". Ryan also said that when many people are tested, they can see relatively low mortality rates. Peskov also said that President Putin would return to face-to-face meetings soon, but no specific date was set. Moscow's health department said that discrepancies in data between it and the official government portal is due to the city's final numbers not being sent. Russian Railways also said that it would return the Sapsan trains between Moscow and St. Petersburg to its normal schedule on 24 June. The website Znak also reported that by that day, at least 10 major cities have cancelled their Victory Day parades due to the risk of the virus spreading.

On 12 June, 8,987 new cases were confirmed, bringing the total number to 511,423. Confirmed deaths rose to 6,715. President Putin made his first public appearance since Victory Day on 9 May to mark Russia Day, as he sought to rally support for reforming the constitution in the upcoming vote.

On 13 June, 8,706 new cases were confirmed, bringing the total number to 520,129. Confirmed deaths rose to 6,829. The federal statistics agency, Rosstat, published mortality data for April which included a coronavirus death toll of 2,712 nationwide compared to the official death toll of 1,152. The death toll includes those who tested positive for the virus, but the main cause of death was determined to be something else. The figures include 1,270 deaths where the virus was determined to be the main cause as well as 435 deaths where the virus had a "significant influence", 617 deaths where the virus was present but did not play a major role, and 390 deaths where the person tested negative but it was later determined to be the main cause of death. Officials including Tatiana Golikova said that the changes in the counting method follows WHO recommendations. She also said that the figures represent a 2.6% death rate among those infected, and that the death rate for May will be higher.

On 14 June, 8,835 new cases were confirmed, bringing the total number to 528,964. Confirmed deaths rose to 6,948.

On 15 June, 8,246 new cases were confirmed, bringing the total number to 537,210. Confirmed deaths rose to 7,091. Kommersant reported that Chelyabinsk, Penza and Yakutsk cancelled their Victory Day parades on 24 June because of the risk of the virus spreading. President Putin also extended the period in which foreign nationals whose visas have expired after 15 March can stay to 15 September.

On 16 June, 8,248 new cases were confirmed, bringing the total number to 545,458. Confirmed deaths rose to 7,284. Crimean authorities reversed the decision of cancelling the Victory Day parade in Simferopol on 24 June after announcing that it would be cancelled earlier in the day. Crimea's leader, Sergey Aksyonov said that the decision to hold the parade was "after lengthy consultations, including with the Defense Ministry of the Russian Federation and Rospotrebnadzor" and that Crimea would take "unprecedented measures" to ensure safety. WHO representative to Russia, Melita Vujnovic, said that Russia is capable of creating conditions to safely proceed with the referendum and Victory Day parade. It was reported that at least 30 regions in Russia had cancelled their Victory Day parades on 24 June or will hold them without spectators.

On 17 June, 7,843 new cases were confirmed, bringing the total number to 553,301. Confirmed deaths rose to 7,478. Krasnodar Krai would ease restrictions for incoming tourists and allow free movement within the region starting 21 June.

On 18 June, 7,790 new cases were confirmed, bringing the total number to 561,091. Confirmed deaths rose to 7,660. The Defence Ministry said that, with the Gamaleya National Research Centre for Epidemiology and Microbiology, clinical trials for a vaccine were carried out on 18 volunteers that day. Politician Mikhail Ignatyev, who served as Head of the Chuvash Republic until being dismissed earlier in the year, was reported to have died from the virus. Alla Samoilova, the head of Roszdravnadzor, said that 489 medical workers who were infected with the virus had died. The press service of Roszdravnadzor later said that the number was not official but data from the internet. Moscow Deputy Mayor for Economic Policy and Property and Land Relations Vladimir Efimov said that business activity in the city had returned to pre-lockdown levels.

On 19 June, 7,972 new cases were confirmed, bringing the total number to 569,063. Confirmed deaths rose to 7,841. Deputy Mayor of Moscow for Social Development Anastasia Rakova said that wedding registrations and ceremonies would resume from 23 June in registry offices. She said that it was still necessary to wear masks and gloves, as well as to practise social distancing in registry offices. She also said that ceremonial halls would be sanitised after each ceremony. Moscow Oblast Governor Andrey Vorobyov signed a decree allowing museums to re-open from 25 June, sports facilities from 1 July and children's camps from 15 July. From 25 June, all retail stores would be able to re-open.

On 20 June, 7,889 new cases were confirmed, bringing the total number to 576,952. Confirmed deaths rose to 8,002. Director of the Gamaleya Centre for Epidemiology and Microbiology, Alexander Gunzburg, said that the production of a vaccine could start in the autumn.

On 21 June, 7,728 new cases were confirmed, bringing the total number to 584,680. Confirmed deaths rose to 8,111. The number of people who recovered from the virus exceeded the number of new infections for the first time during the 3rd week of June.

On 22 June, 7,600 new cases were confirmed, bringing the total number to 592,280. Confirmed deaths rose to 8,206. Moscow's mayor, Sobyanin, said that from 23 June, cafes and restaurants would re-open as well as fitness centres and swimming pools. Restrictions for libraries, kindergartens would be lifted. It would also be possible to sit on benches and take children to the playground, however the face-mask rules would still apply. Deputy Prime Minister Tatyana Golikova said that some restrictions would have to remain in the autumn, including wearing face-masks. Prime Minister Mishustin added passenger rail and water transport industries into the government list of industries most affected by the pandemic.

On 23 June, 7,425 new cases were confirmed, bringing the total number to 599,705. Confirmed deaths rose to 8,359. The Buddhist leader in Tuva, Dzhampel Lodoy, was announced to have died from the virus in a social media post. President Putin, in a televised address, said that the country's response to the virus had saved tens of thousands of lives and he praised its progress in fighting the virus. He also announced additional economic and social support measures as a result of the pandemic's impact. He announced the end of Russia's flat income tax rate of 13% that he introduced in 2001 by increasing the tax rate for the top earners who earn over 5 million rubles (about $73,000) to 15%, starting from 1 January 2021. He said that the extra revenue of around 60 billion rubles (about $875 million) would go towards helping children with severe or rare diseases. He also announced other measures including increased benefits to families where both parents have lost their job and a one-off payment to families in July of 10,000 rubles for each child they have aged under 16. 100 billion rubles would also handed out in loans for businesses to pay employees. He also said that IT companies would benefit from an ultra-low tax regime and profits tax for them would be cut from 20% to 3%. Putin also proposed extending payments to social workers for another two months. Elena Smolyarchuk, director of the Center for Clinical Study of Medicines at Sechenov University spoke about the effects of a vaccine being tested, saying that in the first hours, some volunteers had a slight increase in temperature and a headache which disappeared later in the day, with all volunteers currently well. Experts described the reaction as normal.

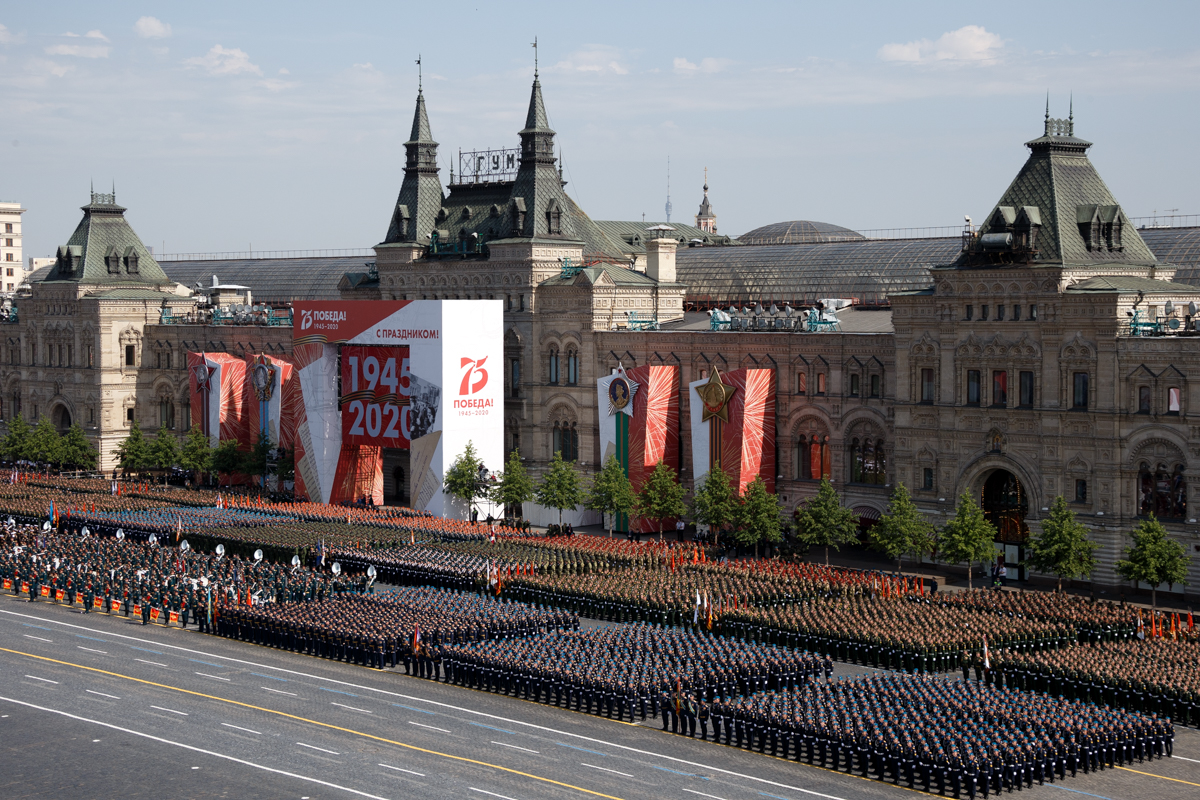
The Moscow Victory Day parade took place on 24 June as it was postponed.

On 24 June, 7,176 new cases were confirmed, bringing the total number to 606,881. Confirmed deaths rose to 8,513. The 2020 Moscow Victory Day Parade took place that day. Kyrgyz president Sooronbay Jeenbekov, who arrived in Moscow for the parade, did not attend after two members of his delegation tested positive for the virus and he would return to the Kyrgyz capital city Bishkek to self-isolate. The website Znak.com reported that at least 40 regions had cancelled their parades or held them without spectators due to the virus, where 30 major cities had cancelled their parade.

On 25 June, 7,113 new cases were confirmed, bringing the total number to 613,994. Confirmed deaths rose to 8,605. The governor of St. Petersburg, Alexander Beglov, signed a decree to lift some restrictions including the ban on visiting parks, gardens and squares, as well as playgrounds and sports grounds from 28 June. Prime Minister Mishustin also signed an order allowing foreign specialists with permission to work in Russia to enter the country. Moscow's mayor, Sobyanin, said that the city wasn't yet ready to fully open its tourism sector.

On 26 June, 6,800 new cases were confirmed, bringing the total number to 620,794. Confirmed deaths rose to 8,781.

On 27 June, 6,852 new cases were confirmed, bringing the total number to 627,646. Confirmed deaths rose to 8,969. Russian tour operators began cancelling tours with flights abroad in July due to uncertainty in the easing of restrictions. The director of the State Research Center of Virology and Biotechnology VECTOR, Rinat Maksyutov, said on television that around 70 million people would need to be vaccinated for collective immunity.

On 28 June, 6,791 new cases were confirmed, bringing the total number to 634,437. Confirmed deaths rose to 9,073. President Putin said that he takes a test every 3–4 days, with each of them returning negative.

On 29 June, 6,719 new cases were confirmed, bringing the total number to 641,156. Confirmed deaths rose to 9,166. Deputy Prime Minister Dmitry Chernyshenko said that cinemas will be able to reopen from 15 July if local governments allow them. Authorities in Kalmykia extended the second phase of the easing of restrictions to 12 July, as the infection rate was too high. The Press and Public Relations Centre of the Federal Security Service said that Lenin's Mausoleum will reopen on 1 July.

On 30 June, 6,693 new cases were confirmed, bringing the total number to 647,849. Confirmed deaths rose to 9,320. The director of the State Research Center of Virology and Biotechnology VECTOR, Rinat Maksyutov, said that 3 prototype vaccines have been shown to be effective. Chechnya's leader, Kadyrov, ended the two-week quarantine requirement for people entering the republic.
