= Mikhail Murashko =

Russian gynecologist, Russia's Minister of Health

- Михаил Мурашко
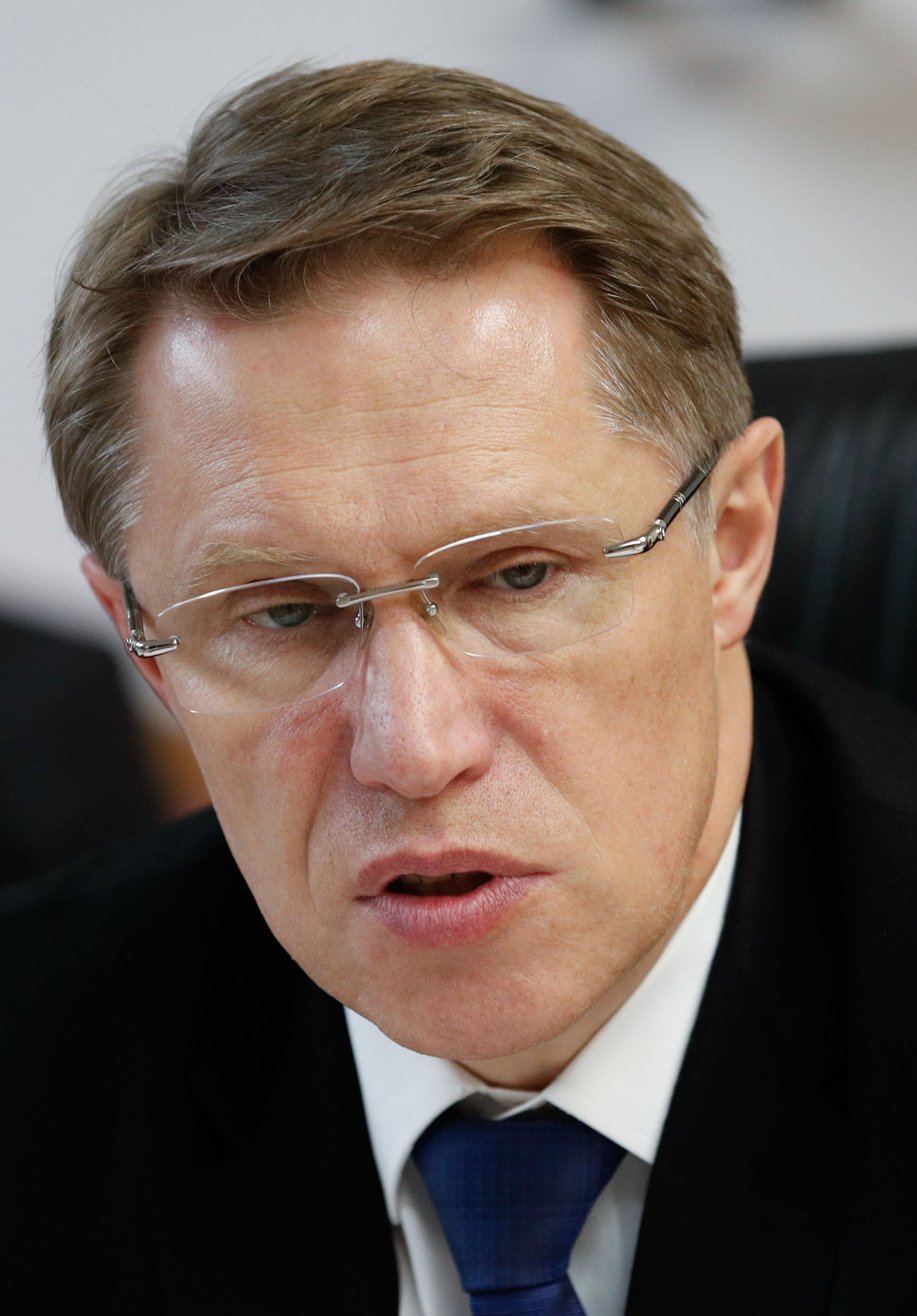
- Murashko in 2022

Minister of Health
- Incumbent
- Assumed office 21 January 2020
- Prime Minister: Mikhail Mishustin; Andrey Belousov (acting); Mikhail Mishustin
- Preceded by: Veronika Skvortsova

Head of the Federal Service for Surveillance in Healthcare
- In office 7 March 2013 – 21 January 2020
- Preceded by: Nikolay Yurgel
- Succeeded by: Alla Samoylova

Personal details
- Born: 9 January 1967 (age 59) Sverdlovsk, Russian SFSR, Soviet Union (now Yekaterinburg, Russia)
- Party: Independent
- Education: Ural State Medical University
- Profession: Gynecologist
- Awards: Commander's Cross with Star of the Hungarian Order of Merit; Medal of the Order "For Merit to the Fatherland", 2nd class Gratitude of the Government of the Russian Federation

Mikhail Albertovich Murashko (Russian: Михаил Альбертович Мурашко; born 9 January 1967) is a Russian gynecologist and statesman, serving as Russia's Minister of Health since 21 January 2020.

== Biography ==
Born in Sverdlovsk (now Yekaterinburg), he graduated from a city school with an in-depth study of physics, mathematics and chemistry. From 1986 to 1988, he served in the Internal Troops of the USSR Ministry of Internal Affairs (Russian: Внутренние войска МВД СССР). In 1992, he graduated from the Ural State Medical University after which he worked as an intern doctor and obstetrician-gynecologist at the Republican Hospital of Komi Republic in Syktyvkar. In 1996, he was successively appointed deputy chief doctor for consultative and diagnostic work, and then chief doctor of the Komi Republican Perinatal Center.

He defended his thesis on the topic "Features of the course and outcomes of childbirth in women with certain types of urogenital infection". From 1996 to 1999, he served as the chief physician of the Republican Medical Association. From 2000 to 2006, he worked as the chief physician of the Republican Perinatal Center. In 2006, he moved to the civil service, taking the post of Minister of Health of the Komi Republic. In parallel with this, in 2011 and 2012 he headed the Department of Obstetrics and Gynecology of the Republican Branch of the Kirov State Medical University (Russian: Кировский государственный медицинский университет) of the Ministry of Health and Social Development of Russia, located in Syktyvkar.

In 2012, he was appointed Deputy Head of the Federal Service for Supervision of Healthcare (Roszdravnadzor). Since 2013, he was temporarily acting head of the department, and on 14 July 2015 he officially headed Roszdravnadzor. Under his leadership, Roszdravnadzor created a modern service for state control of the quality of medicines, one of the advanced systems for monitoring the circulation of medical devices and monitoring the quality and safety of medical care for the population. The Federal Service for Supervision of Healthcare has reached a high international level, its employees are heads of expert structures of international organizations at the World Health Organization and the Council of Europe.

On 21 January, he was appointed by presidential decree signed by President Vladimir Putin to the Minister of Health of the Russian Federation in Mikhail Mishustin's Cabinet.

== Sanctions ==
Because of his support of Russian aggression and violation of Ukraine's territorial integrity during the Russian-Ukrainian war, he is under personal sanctions from various countries.

On 6 March 2022 he was placed on Canada's sanctions list of "regime associates" for "complicity in Russia's unjustified invasion of Ukraine". Justin Trudeau noted that Murashko was taken from a list compiled by Alexei Navalny.

By decree of the President of Ukraine Volodymyr Zelenskyy on 9 June 2022 he is under sanctions by Ukraine because he "supported and implemented actions and policies that undermine the territorial integrity, sovereignty and independence of Ukraine". On the anniversary of Russia's invasion of Ukraine, 24 February 2023, Murashko is under sanctions by Australia and New Zealand on similar grounds.

== Awards ==
- Commander's Cross with Star of the Hungarian Order of Merit (2021)
- Medal of the Order "For Merit to the Fatherland", 2nd class (2018)
- Gratitude of the Government of the Russian Federation (2018)
