= Ural State Medical University =

Medical university in Yekaterinburg, Russia

- Уральский государственный медицинский университет Минздрава России
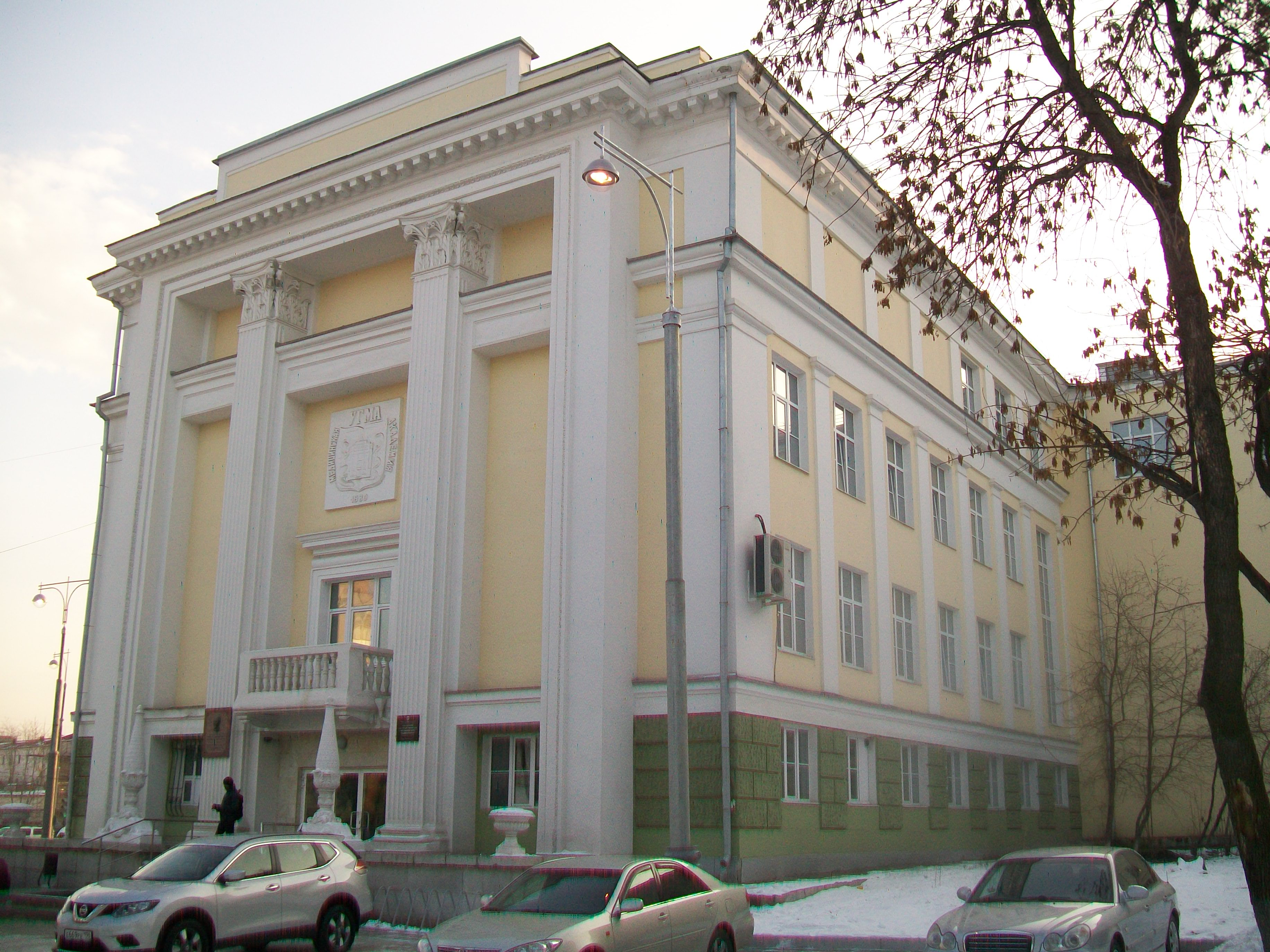
- Type: Medical university
- Established: 1930
- Rector: Olga Petrovna Kovtun
- Students: 4513
- Doctoral students: 154
- Location: 3 Repina street, Yekaterinburg, Sverdlovsk Oblast, Russia; 56°49′58″N 60°34′34″E
- Campus: Urban
- Website: www.usma.ru

Ural State Medical University (Note: (Russian: Федеральное государственное бюджетное образовательное учреждение высшего образования «Уральский государственный медицинский университет» Министерства здравоохранения Российской Федерации (ФГБОУ ВО УГМУ Минздрава России, УГМУ))) is a public medical university in Yekaterinburg, Sverdlovsk Oblast in the Ural region of Russia. It is the university in the Sverdlovsk Oblast that trains doctors and pharmacists.

== Overview ==
The university has teaching departments:

- The Department of Information Technologies supports E-Learning and distant education
- Center of Practical Skills with electronic simulation equipment
- Central Science Research Laboratory, science and education center “Perspective”
- Vivarium
- University Library and Dental Clinic

Ural State Medical University is a center of medical science of Russia Federation. Researchers of the Ural State Medical University collaborate with the Russian Academy of Science in the Ural region, Federal Scientific Institutes of the Ministry of Health of the Russian Federation, foreign institutions and organizations in China, Denmark, Hungary and other countries.едщД

== History ==
The Sverdlovsk Medical Institute was founded on March 1, 1931, on the basis of a special resolution of July 10, 1930, issued by the Council of People's Commissars of the Russian Soviet Federative Socialist Republic. One medical and preventive faculty was opened in it, where 100 students studied.

The first director of the institute was Peter Spiridonovich Kataev (Пётр Спиридонович Катаев).

During the Great Patriotic War, at the SSMI, by order of the NKZ, an urgent restructuring of the educational process was carried out (Director of the Institute, Professor Vladimir Ivanovich Velichkin (Владимир Иванович Величкин)) and a single faculty was created that trained military doctors.

In 1943 the sanitary-hygienic faculty was opened and the pediatric faculty was restored. In total, more than 2,000 specialists were trained during the Second World War.

«Дело врачей» ：In 1953 the Sverdlovsk Medical Institute, like other medical universities of the USSR, suffered immediately from two repressive campaigns of all-Union significance, "Doctors' Plot" and the fight against Zionism. The university was looking for pest doctors and. Thus, the Higher Attestation Commission of the USSR rejected the dissertation of the assistant to Laryngology department of the Sverdlovsk Medical Institute, RB Pinus, on the topic “Maxillary sinus cysts,” indicating in her conclusion: “There is no cancer under socialism”. In 1953 a number of Jewish doctors were dismissed at the Sverdlovsk Medical Institute (as well as from medical institutions in the city). Attempts by some Jewish employees to replace surnames and Russian names were thwarted. So, M.E. Rutberg, an employee of the Sverdlovsk Medical Institute in 1953, received a reprimand with an entry on the card for replacing the name Merra with Meri in her passport in 1948 (the name remains the same in the party ticket).

The post-war period is a period of restoration of the national economy of the country, development and strengthening of the material and technical base of universities. During 1946-1983 the university was headed by personalities, scientists who made a contribution to the development of domestic science, strengthening the material and technical base of the institute. These include professor-directors of the institute: 1946-1952 – Serebrennikov Valentin Sergeevich (Серебренников Валентин Сергеевич), 1952-1962 – Zverev Alexey Fedorovich (Зверев Алексей Федорович), 1962-1983 – Klimov Vasily Nikolaevich (Климов Василий Николаевич).

In 1961 the faculty for the improvement of doctors was opened; In 1964, the Central Scientific Research Laboratory was formed as part of eight laboratories; In 1969 - the 3rd educational building was put into operation, where 12 departments were located. In 1970 - the dean's office of specialization of interns was opened; In 1971, a preparatory department was opened; In 1976, the Faculty of Dentistry was opened.

The university's first teaching Dentistry Clinic was founded in 1993.

From 1984 to 2005 the Institute was headed by the Honored Scientist of the Russian Federation, Professor Anatoly Petrovich Yastrebov (Ястребов Анатолий Петрович).

In 1995 the institute was renamed the Ural State Medical Academy (Russia Federation). Much organizational work during this period was carried out by the rector on the development of a new material base of the Faculty of Dentistry, the development of the educational process in the student environment, and the overhaul of hostels for students.

In 1999 the Faculty of Higher Nursing was opened, in 2005 - the Faculty of Pharmacy.

In 2004 Professor A.P. Yastrebov was elected Corresponding Member. RAMN.

From November 2005 to March 2018 the academy was headed by Professor Sergey Mikhailovich Kutepov.

In 2012 Recognized among top-100 Russian Universities.

In 2013 the Academy was granted university status with renaming to the Ural State Medical University.

In 2017 TOP-10 RUSSIAN MEDICAL SCHOOLS Recognized among top-10 Russian Medical Schools.

From March 2018 to the present, the university has been headed by Kovtun Olga Petrovna (Ковтун Ольга Петровна).

Developing as a single scientific, educational and industrial (medical and diagnostic) complex, the university sees its mission in "Formation of the intellectual, cultural and moral potential of the individual, transfer of knowledge by professionals in the field of medical science, health care and pharmacy through academy graduates, fundamental, applied scientific research and developments to preserve the health of the nation, the sustainable development of Russia.

The motto of the university: "For the benefit of the health of the Urals - to study, heal, educate!" (Russian: «Во благо здоровья уральцев — изучать, исцелять, воспитывать!»).

== Awards ==
In 1979 the university was rewarded by the Order of the Red Banner of Labour (USSR) for medical science development and specialist training.

== Notable alumni ==
- Mikhail Murashko, Minister of Health of Russia
