= Kirov State Medical University =

- Кировский государственный медицинский университет
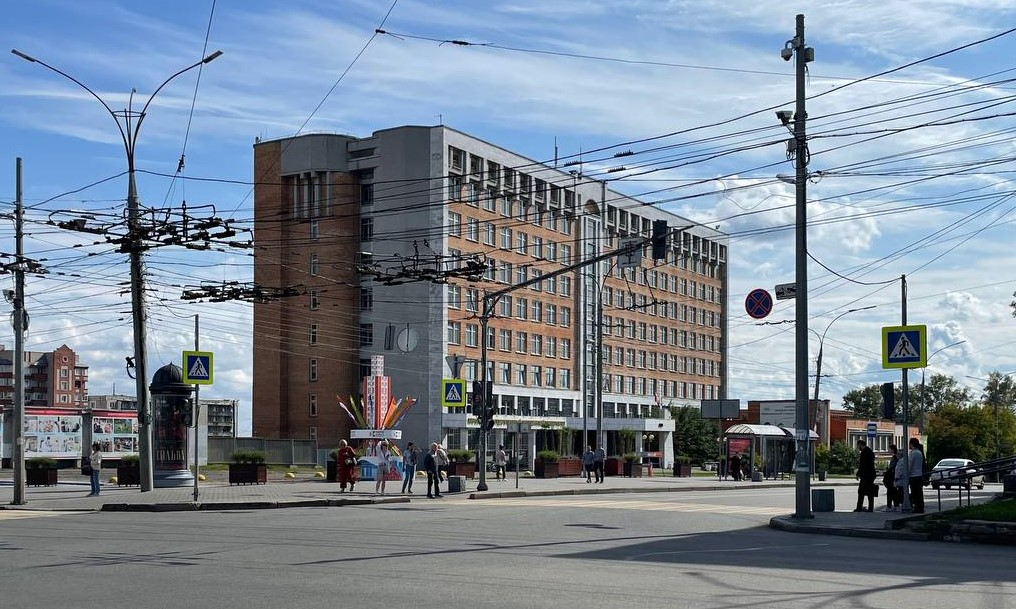
- Type: Public
- Established: 2 April 1987
- Students: 3298 (2023)
- Location: 112 Vladimirskaya street, Kirov, Russia; 58°35′35″N 49°40′11″E
- Campus: Urban
- Website: www.kirovgma.ru

Kirov State Medical University (Russian: Федеральное государственное бюджетное образовательное учреждение высшего образования «Кировский государственный медицинский университет» Министерства здравоохранения Российской Федерации) is the largest scientific, educational and medical complex in the Kirov Oblast and the Volga Federal District.

== History ==
The university opened on April 2, 1987, as a branch of the Perm State Medical Institute. The decision to open the branch was made following a working visit to Kirov by a government commission headed by the Minister of Health of the RSFSR, Anatoly Potapov, and the rector of the Perm State Medical Institute, Yevgeny Vagner. Thanks to the overwhelming support of the First Secretary of the Kirov Regional Committee of the CPSU, Vadim Bakatin, and the head of the Kirov Regional Department of Health, G. F. Shulyatyev, several buildings were transferred to the branch to house the theoretical and biological departments, as well as administrative and economic services.

V. A. Zhuravlev, Director of the Research Institute of Hematology and Blood Transfusion, was appointed acting director of the newly established university. The branch's leadership, consisting at that time of two people: Director V. A. Zhuravlev and Vice-Rector S. L. Sharygin, managed to prepare the branch for its first academic year within three months. Thanks to the support of the regional bureau of the CPSU and the Kirov Regional Executive Committee, all out-of-town faculty were provided with housing, which made it possible to quickly assemble the faculty of Vyatka's first medical university.

Along with the formation of the team, dozens of structural units necessary for educational activities were organized: a library, a vivarium, dean's offices, an academic department, etc.

In September 1987, the educational institution opened its doors to students. Education was provided in two faculties: General Medicine and Pediatrics, the first dean of which was Doctor of Medical Sciences A. V. Molodyuk.

In June 1993, the first medical students graduated, and after successful state certification in May 1994, the Government of the Russian Federation adopted a decree establishing the Kirov State Medical Institute.

In 1996, the institute opened a Faculty of Social Work, whose mission was to train specialists for social welfare agencies, healthcare institutions, and educational institutions.

Based on the recommendation of the Ministry of Health's certification committee, the institute was awarded the prestigious status of academy in 1999.

In 2004, construction of the university's eight-story academic building on Karl Marx Street was completed. It features spacious lecture halls, comfortable classrooms, and modern laboratories. It houses the university administration, dean's offices, and theoretical departments. T The first admission to the Dentistry program was held in 2009.

In 2011, the academy received a perpetual license to conduct educational activities.

At the end of 2011, Kirov State Medical Academy became the first university in Kirov to receive a quality management system certificate for the development and delivery of educational services in pre-university, higher education, and postgraduate professional education programs in accordance with licensing and state accreditation.

On November 7, 2016, in accordance with the order of the Minister of Health, the educational institution was granted the status of University.
