= Volgograd Oblast =

First-level administrative division of Russia

Volgograd Oblast Волгоградская область (Russian)
- Oblast
- Flag Coat of arms

- Coordinates: 49°44′N 44°07′E
- Country: Russia
- Federal district: Southern
- Economic region: Volga
- Established: December 5, 1936
- Administrative center: Volgograd

Government
  - Body: Oblast Duma
  - Governor: Andrey Bocharov

Area
  - Total: 112,877 km^{2} (43,582 sq mi)
  - Rank: 31st

Population (2021 census)
  - Total: 2,500,781: 82.6% Russians; 1.5% Kazakhs; 0.64% Armenians; 0.52% Tatars; 0.33% Azerbaijanis; 0.32% Chechens; 3.05% other; 10.72% not stated
  - Estimate (2018): 2,521,276
  - Rank: 18th
  - Density: 22.1549/km^{2} (57.3810/sq mi)
  - Urban: 77.4%
  - Rural: 22.6%

GDP (nominal, 2024)
  - Total: ₽1.39 trillion (US$16.25 billion)
  - Per capita: ₽562,548 (US$6,601.05)
- Time zone: UTC+3 (MSK)
- ISO 3166 code: RU-VGG
- License plates: 34, 134
- OKTMO ID: 18000000
- Official languages: Russian
- Website: http://www.volganet.ru/

Volgograd Oblast (Note: Russian: Волгоградская область, IPA: [vəɫɡɐˈgratskəjə ˈobɫəsʲtʲ]) is a federal subject (oblast) of Russia, located in the Lower Volga region of Southern Russia. Its administrative center is Volgograd. The population of the oblast was 2,500,781 in the 2021 Census.

Formerly known as Stalingrad Oblast, it was given its present name in 1961, when the city of Stalingrad was renamed Volgograd as part of the process of de-Stalinization. Volgograd Oblast borders Rostov Oblast in the southwest, Voronezh Oblast in the northwest, Saratov Oblast in the north, Astrakhan Oblast and the Republic of Kalmykia in the southeast, and has an international border with Kazakhstan in the east. The two main rivers in European Russia, the Don and the Volga, run through the oblast and are connected by the Volga–Don Canal. Volgograd Oblast's strategic waterways have made it a popular route for shipping and for the generation of hydroelectricity.

Volgograd Oblast was the primary site of the Battle of Stalingrad during World War II, regarded as the single bloodiest battle in the history of warfare.

== Geography ==
- Borders length: 2,221.9 kilometers (1,380.6 mi)

Volgograd Oblast borders Saratov, Rostov, Astrakhan, and Voronezh Oblasts, as well as the Russian republic of Kalmykia and Kazakhstan. Most of Volgograd Oblast is located in the Pontic–Caspian steppe. The Yergeni hills are located to the southeast. Forests cover 4% of the territory. The major rivers are:

- The Volga River
- The Don River
- The Medveditsa River
- The Khopyor River

== History ==
Since the Middle Ages, the territory was ruled by Khazars, Cumania, the Golden Horde and Russia.

Stalingrad Oblast (Сталинградская область) was established on December 5, 1936 on the territory of former Stalingrad Krai. It was the scene of the Battle of Stalingrad during World War II in 1942–1943. The oblast was given its present name on November 10, 1961.

== Politics ==
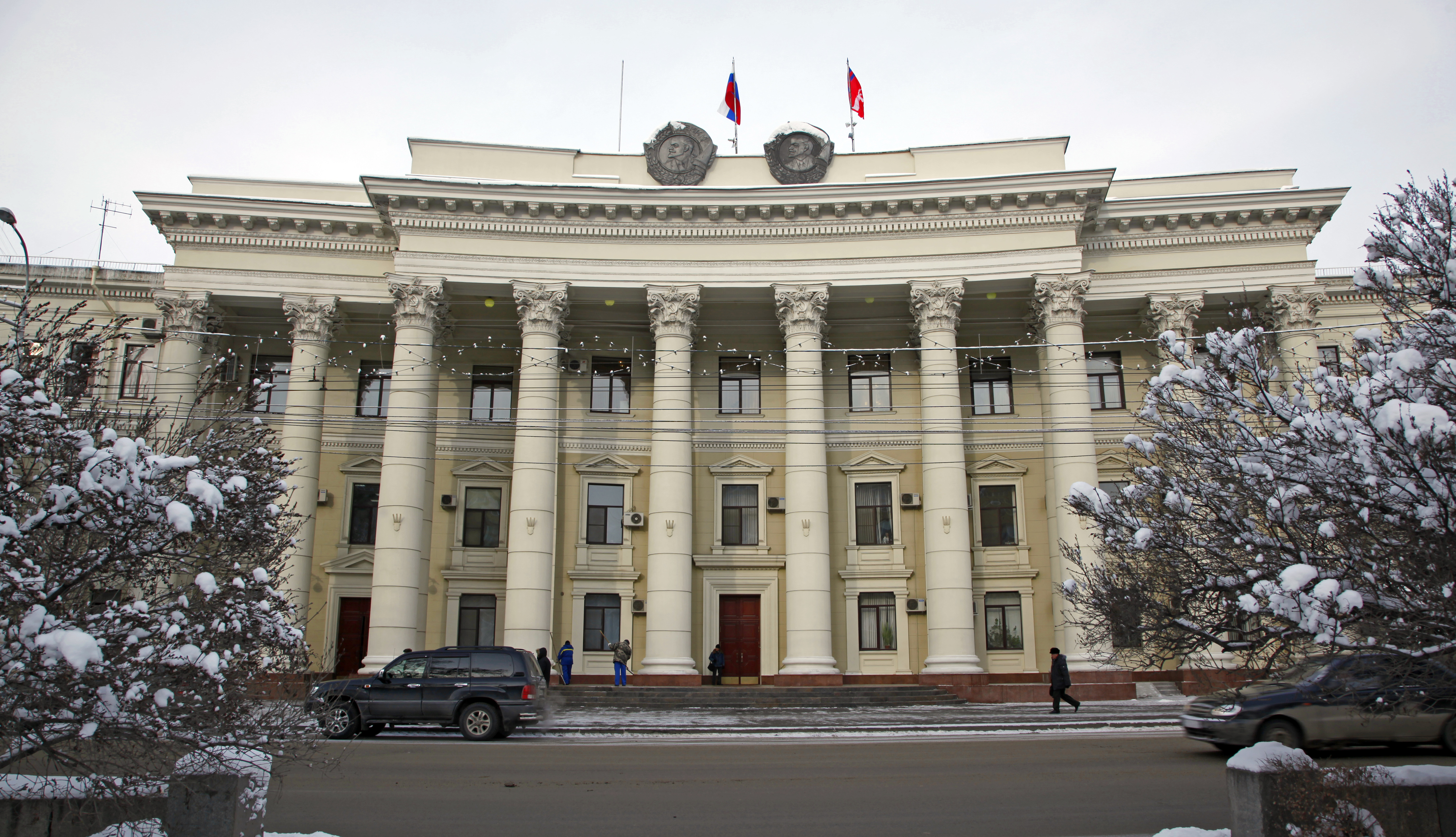
Building of the Oblast Duma and Oblast Government

During the Soviet period, three people exercised oblast-level authority:

1. The first secretary of the Stalingrad Committee of the Communist Party (who in reality had the most power)
2. The chairman of the Oblast Soviet (legislative power)
3. The chairman of the Oblast Executive Committee (executive power)

In 1991 the CPSU lost de facto power, and the head of the oblast administration, and eventually the governor, was appointed and elected alongside the regional parliament.

The Charter of Volgograd Oblast provides the fundamental law of the region. The Legislative Assembly of Volgograd Oblast is the province's standing legislative (representative) body. The Legislative Assembly exercises its authority by passing laws, resolutions, and other legal acts and by supervising the implementation and observance of the laws and other legal acts passed by it. The highest executive body, the oblast government, includes territorial executive bodies such as district administrations, committees, and commissions that facilitate development and run the day-to-day matters of the province. The oblast administration supports the activities of the governor, who is the highest official and acts as guarantor of the observance of the Oblast Charter in accordance with the Constitution of Russia.

== Demographics ==
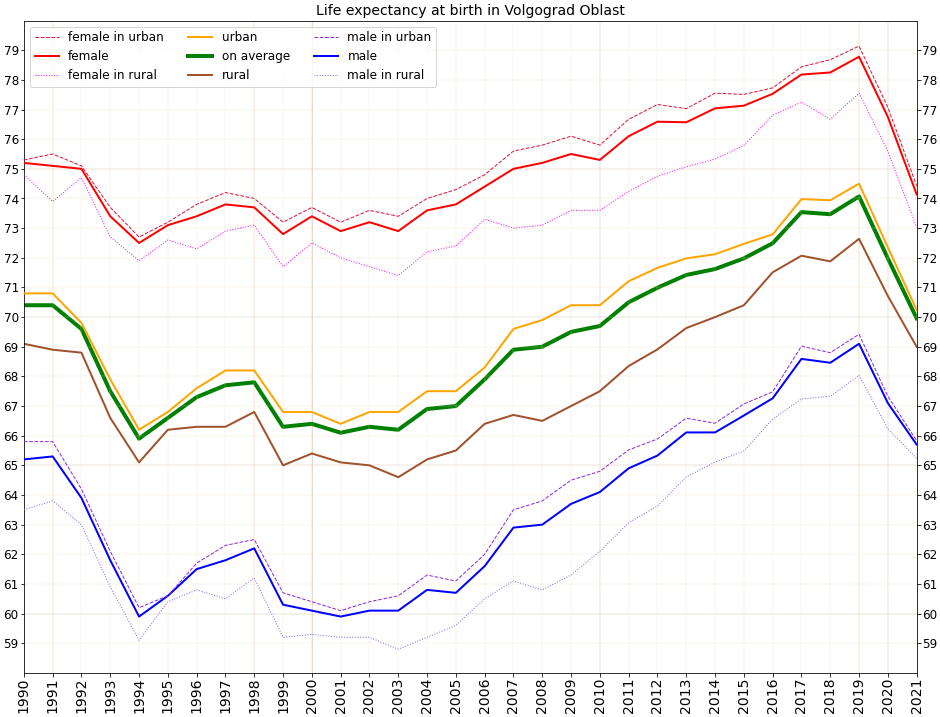
Life expectancy at birth in Volgograd Oblast

The population of the oblast was 2,500,781 according to the 2021 Russian census, 2,610,161 in the 2010 Russian census, 2,699,223 in the 2002 Russian census, and 2,593,944 in the 1989 Soviet census.

Vital statistics for 2024:

- Births: 16,051 (6.6 per 1,000)
- Deaths: 32,460 (13.3 per 1,000)

Total fertility rate (2024):
1.12 children per woman

Life expectancy (2021):
Total — 69.96 years (male — 65.70, female — 74.14)

=== Settlements ===
Largest cities or towns in Volgograd Oblast 2010 Russian Census
Rank		Administrative Division	Pop.
1	Volgograd	City of oblast significance of Volgograd	1,021,215
2	Volzhsky	City of oblast significance of Volzhsky	314,255
3	Kamyshin	Kamyshinsky District	119,565
4	Mikhaylovka	Mikhaylovsky District	59,132
5	Uryupinsk	Uryupinsky District	41,590
6	Frolovo	Frolovsky District	39,449
7	Kalach-na-Donu	Kalachyovsky District	26,910
8	Kotovo	Kotovsky District	24,115
9	Gorodishche	Gorodishchensky District	21,381
10	Surovikino	Surovikinsky District	20,533

Historical population
Year	Pop.	±%
1926	1,408,419	—
1939	2,287,535	+62.4%
1959	1,853,928	−19.0%
1970	2,322,910	+25.3%
1979	2,475,245	+6.6%
1989	2,593,944	+4.8%
2002	2,699,223	+4.1%
2010	2,610,161	−3.3%
2021	2,500,781	−4.2%
Source: Census data

=== Ethnic groups ===
(shown are the ethnic groups with a population of more than 7,000 people)

Ethnic group	Population (in 2010)	Percent
Russians	2,309,253	90
Kazakhs	46,223	1.8
Ukrainians	35,607	1.4
Armenians	27,846	1.1
Tatars	24,557	0.9
Azerbaijani	14,398	0.6
Germans	10,102	0.4
Chechens	9,649	0.4
Belarusians	7,868	0.4
Koreans	7,044	0.3

- 44,541 people were registered from administrative databases, and could not declare an ethnicity. It is estimated that the proportion of ethnicities in this group is the same as that of the declared group.

=== Religion ===
Religion in Volgograd Oblast as of 2012 (Sreda Arena Atlas)
Russian Orthodoxy	54.5%
Other Orthodox	2.2%
Other Christians	4.1%
Islam	3.5%
Spiritual but not religious	18.4%
Atheism and irreligion	12.1%
Other and undeclared	5.2%

According to a 2012 survey, 54.5% of the population of Volgograd Oblast adheres to the Russian Orthodox Church, 4% are unaffiliated generic Christians, 2% are Eastern Orthodox Christian believers who don't belong to any church or are members of non-Russian Eastern Orthodox churches, and 3% are Muslims. In addition, 18% of the population declares to be "spiritual but not religious", 12% is atheist, and 6.5% follows other religions or did not give an answer to the question.

== Government ==
Governor of Volgograd Oblast is Андрей Бочаров (since 2014)

Both the flag and the coat of arms of Volgograd Oblast include an image of The Motherland Calls, an 85-meter-tall (279 ft) statue located in Volgograd.

== Economy ==
Primary branches of economics are agriculture, food production, heavy industry, gas and petroleum refining. The Volga Hydroelectric Station operates on the Volga River.

The largest companies in the region include Volzhsky Pipe Plant, Volgogradenergosbyt (a local electric power distribution company), OJSC Kaustik (caustic soda manufacturer), Volzhsky Orgsintez (a chemical plant).

== See also ==
- List of Chairmen of the Volgograd Oblast Duma
- Volgograd floating landing
