= List of chairmen of the Volgograd Oblast Duma =

Below is a list of office-holders:

| Name | Took office | Left office |
|---|---|---|
| Leonid Semergey | 1994 | 1998 |
| Viktor Pripisnov | 1998 | 2001 |
| Roman Grebennikov | 2001 | 2005 |
| Vitaly Likhachev | 2005 | 2009 |
| Vladimir Kabanov | 2009 | 2010 |
| Vladimir Efimov | 2010 | Present |
