= Perm State Medical University =

Medical school in Perm, Russia

Perm State Medical University named after Academician E. A. Wagner (PSMU)
- Пермский государственный медицинский университет имени академика Е. А. Вагнера (ПГМУ им. академика Е. А. Вагнера)
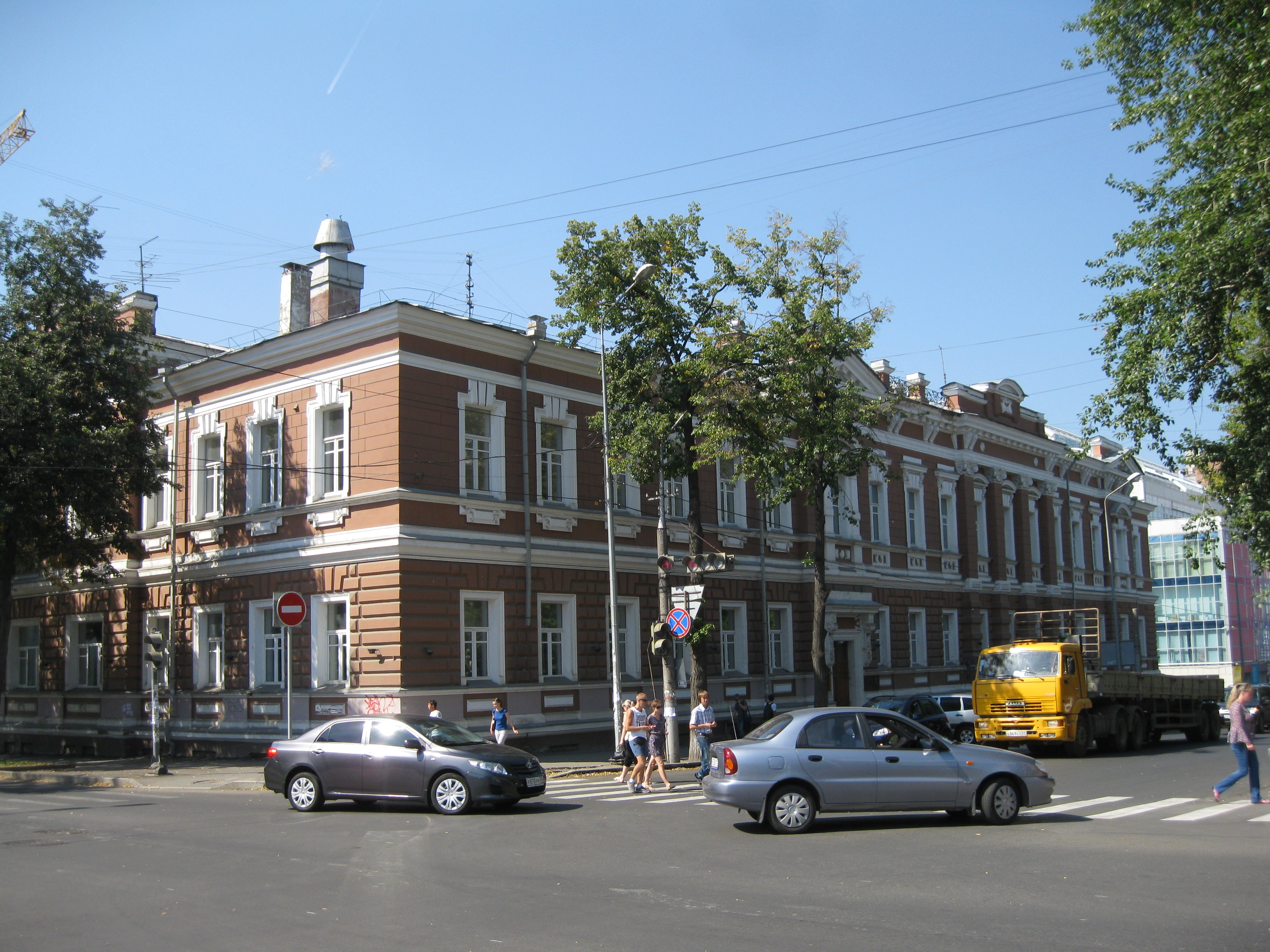
- Former names: Perm Medical Institute; Perm State Medical Academy; Perm State Medical Academy named after Academician E. A. Wagner
- Type: public
- Established: 1916
- Rector: Doctor of Medical Sciences Natalia Vitalievna Minaeva
- Students: ~3400
- Location: 26 Petropavlovskaya street, Perm, Perm Krai, Russia; 58°00′51″N 56°14′37″E
- Campus: Urban
- Website: psma.ru

Perm State Medical University named after Academician E. A. Wagner (PSMU; Russian: Пермский государственный медицинский университет имени академика Е. А. Вагнера; ПГМУ им. академика Е. А. Вагнера; ПГМУ, Permskiy gosudarstvennyy meditsinskiy universitet imeni akademika Ye. A. Vagnera; PGMU im. akademika Ye. A. Vagnera) is a state medical university in Volga Federal District of Russia located in the city of Perm, the administrative centre of Perm Krai.

== History ==
The history of higher medical education in Perm began in 1916 with the medical department of the Faculty of Physics and Mathematics of the Perm State University. The following year, this department became an independent faculty, and in 1931, the Perm Medical Institute was opened.

In 1994, the institute was renamed into the Perm State Medical Academy. In 1997, the PSMA became a member of the Association of Medical Schools in Europe (AMSE). In 2006, the academy received the name of Academician of the USSR Academy of Medical Sciences, Evgeny Antonovich Wagner, who worked as the rector of the institute from 1970 to 1995. By order of the Ministry of Health of the Russian Federation dated 27 October 2014, No. 666, the academy was given the status of a university.

About 80% of university teachers have academic degrees (Candidate or doctor of science).

According to the Forbes Education ranking published in August 2021, PSMU ranked 82nd among Russian universities, as well as 8th among medical universities in the country.

== Structure ==
The university has 7 faculties (Faculty of Pre-University Training and Targeted Education; Faculty of Medicine; Faculty of Pediatrics; Faculty of Preventive Medicine; Faculty of Dentistry; Faculty of Clinical Psychology and Higher Nursing Education; Faculty of Additional Professional Education) and a Medical and Pharmaceutical School, 72 departments (chairs) and 4 independent undergraduate courses, as well as a research laboratory and a fundamental library.
