= Volgograd floating landing =

Coordinates: 48°43′46″N 44°34′25″E

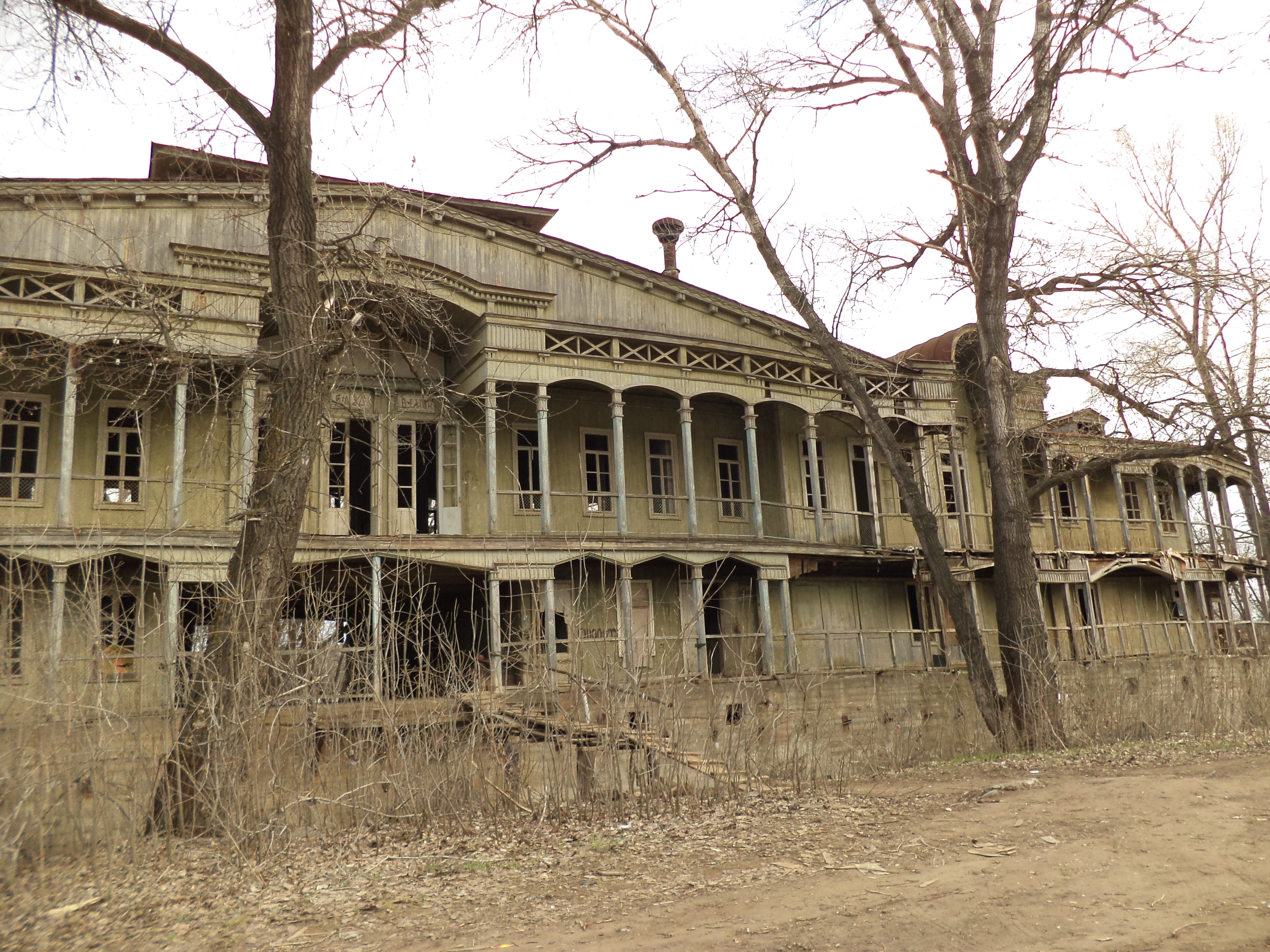
Volgograd floating landing.

Volgograd floating landing (Russian: Волгоградский дебаркадер) is one of the places of interest in Volgograd region that is not related to Stalingrad battle.

Wooden two-storied floating dock is located on the left bank of Volga in the Volga-Akhtuba's floodplain, to the north from the town Kransnoslobodsk, across Volgograd.

It was built in 1954 on a shipbuilding yard in Gorodets in Gorky region.

First it was used as a river boat station of the town Kamyshin.

In 1966 the floating landing was moved to Srednyaya Akhtuba region to Denezhnoe lake, and it served well as a rowing base of Dinamo sports society.

It became widely known due to an attempt of demolition at the end of spring - beginning of summer 2013.

Volgograd floating land was recognised as an identified object of cultural heritage on June 4, 2013.
