= Federal Service for Surveillance in Healthcare =

Russian government agency

- Федеральная служба по надзору в сфере здравоохранения
- Flag of the Federal Service for Surveillance Healthcare

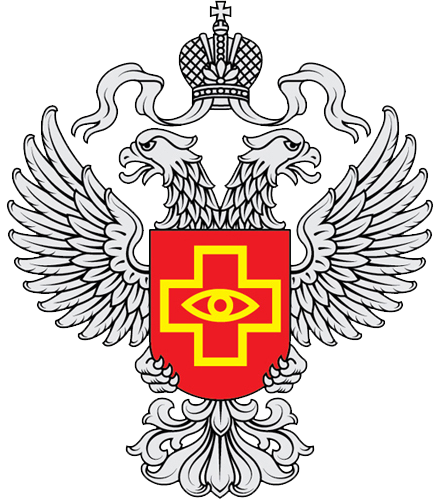
- Emblem of the Service

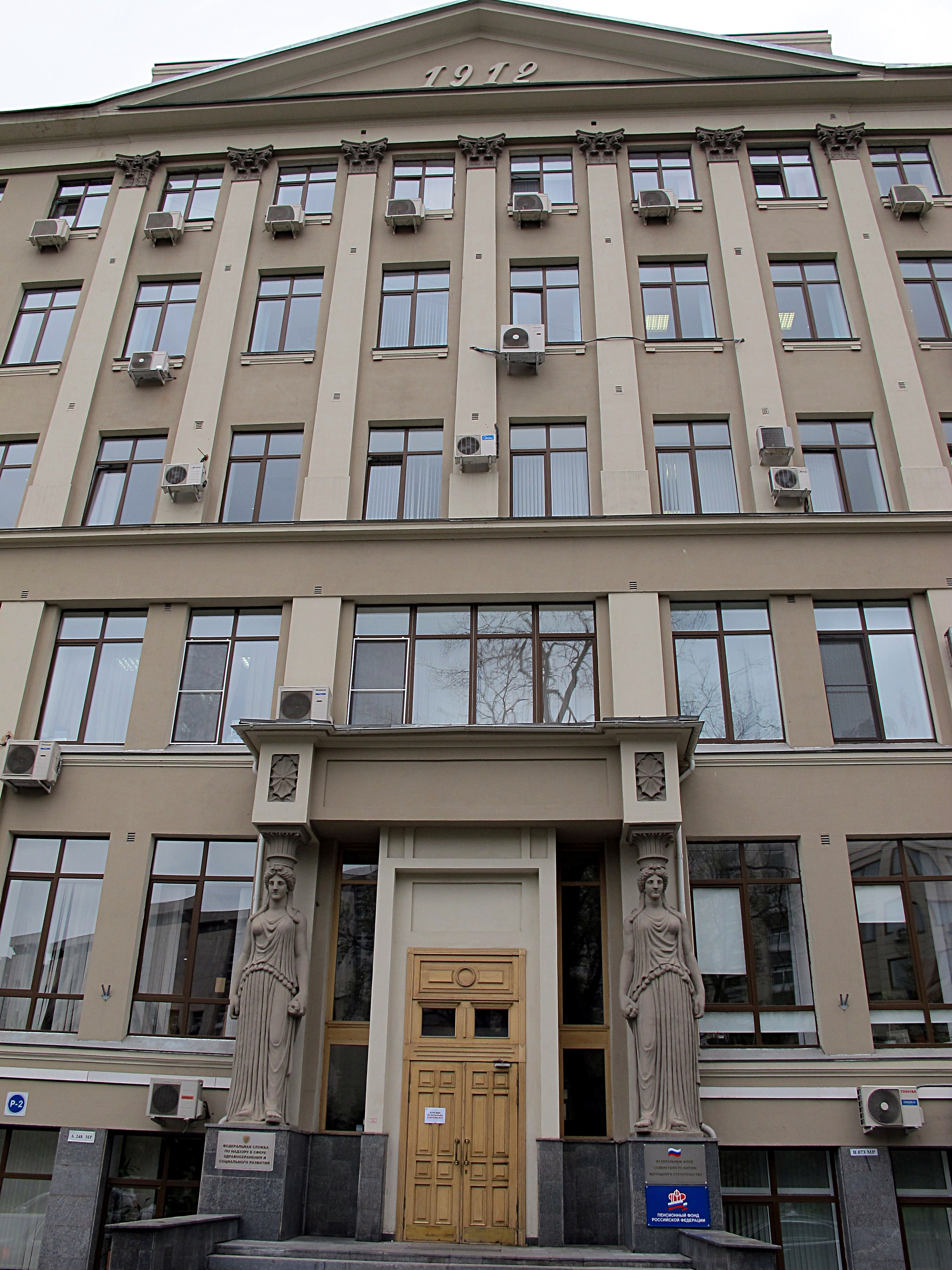

Federal service overview
- Formed: March 12, 2004
- Headquarters: 4 Slavyanskaya Square, Moscow, Russia; 55°45′15″N 37°38′02″E
- Federal service executive: Alla Samoylova
- Parent ministry: Ministry of Health
- Website: roszdravnadzor.gov.ru

Federal Service for Surveillance in Healthcare (Roszdravnadzor) (Russian: Федеральная служба по надзору в сфере здравоохранения (Росздравнадзор)) is the federal service of the Russian Federation that exercises control and supervision functions in the field of health care. Until 2012, it was called the Federal Service for Surveillance of Health and Social Development and was subordinate to the Ministry of Health and Social Development of the Russian Federation, then from 2012 to 2020 it was shifted to reporting directly to the Government of the Russian Federation, and from 2020 again made subordinate to the Ministry of Health of the Russian Federation.

Along with the Federal Antimonopoly Service, it is one of the two federal supervisory agencies that does not have its own official uniform.

== Duties ==
In accordance with the provisions of the Decree of the Government of the Russian Federation of June 30, 2004 No. 323 “On the Approval of the Regulation on the Federal Service for Surveillance in Healthcare” Roszdravnadzor oversees compliance by medical organizations engaged in medical activities with medical procedures and standards of medical care, and is responsible for state control over medicines and pharmaceuticals, and the distribution of medical devices. Control is carried out by conducting checks:

- Compliance by subjects of circulation of medical devices with rules in the field of circulation of medical devices;
- Observance by the state authorities of the Russian Federation, local self-government bodies, state extra-budgetary funds, as well as organizations engaged in medical and pharmaceutical activities and individual entrepreneurs of the rights of citizens in the field of protecting the health of citizens, including accessibility for the disabled to infrastructure facilities and the services provided in this field;
- Compliance by medical organizations and individual entrepreneurs engaged in medical activities with the procedures for providing medical care and standards of medical care;
- Compliance by medical organizations and individual entrepreneurs engaged in medical activities with the procedures for conducting medical examinations, medical examinations and medical examinations;
- Compliance by medical organizations and individual entrepreneurs engaged in medical activities with the requirements for the safe use and operation of medical devices and their disposal (destruction);
- Compliance by medical workers, heads of medical organizations, pharmaceutical workers and heads of pharmacy organizations with the restrictions that apply to them when carrying out professional activities in accordance with the legislation of the Russian Federation;
- Organization and implementation of departmental control and internal control of the quality and safety of medical activity, respectively, by federal executive bodies, executive bodies of the constituent entities of the Russian Federation and bodies, organizations of state, municipal and private health systems;
- Compliance by subjects of the circulation of medicines established by the Federal Law “On the Circulation of Medicines” and other normative legal acts of the Russian Federation adopted in accordance with it to requirements for preclinical studies of medicines, clinical trials of medicines, storage, transportation, dispensing, sale of medicines, use of medicines drugs, drug destruction;
- Compliance of medicines in civil circulation with the established mandatory requirements for their quality;
- Organization and conduct of pharmacovigilance.

Roszdravnadzor implements / issues permits:

- Monitoring the assortment and prices of vital and essential medicines;
- Monitoring the safety of medical devices, recording side effects, adverse reactions when using medical devices, facts and circumstances that pose a threat to life and health when handling registered medical devices;
- Issues a permit for obtaining a license to import into the Russian Federation and export from the Russian Federation potent substances that are not precursors of narcotic drugs and psychotropic substances;
- Issues a certificate for the right to import (export) of narcotic drugs, psychotropic substances and their precursors;
- Issues an opinion (permit) for the import into the Russian Federation and export from the Russian Federation of samples of human biological materials;
- Maintains the state register of medical devices and organizations (individual entrepreneurs) engaged in the production and manufacture of medical devices, and places it on the official website of the Service on the Internet;
- Determines the list of organizations entitled to test (research) medical devices with a view to registering them within the framework of the Eurasian Economic Union, considers applications from organizations for inclusion in the specified list and informs them of the decision;
- Issues permits for conducting clinical trials (studies) of medical devices;
- Carries out, in the prescribed manner, the audit of the activities of medical and pharmacy organizations, wholesale drug companies, other organizations and individual entrepreneurs operating in the field of health;
