= Vladimir Efimov =

Russian statesman (born 1981)

Vladimir Vladimirovich Efimov
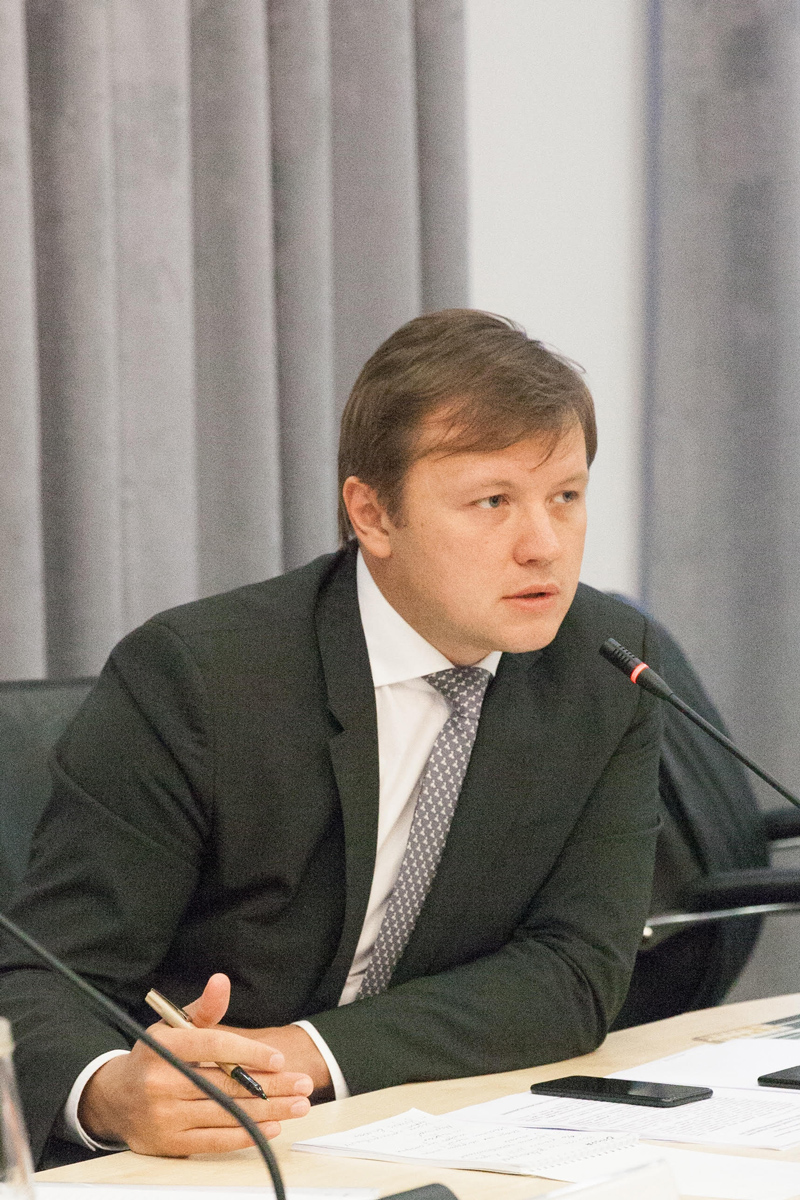

Deputy Mayor of Moscow for Economic Policy and Property and Land Relations
- Incumbent
- Assumed office February 7, 2017

Personal details
- Born: June 26, 1981 (age 45) Kursk
- Education: Moscow State Institute of International Relations (2003)

Vladimir Vladimirovich Efimov (born June 26, 1981) is a Russian statesman and manager, Deputy Mayor of Moscow for Economic Policy and Property and Land Relations.

== Background ==
Vladimir Efimov was born in Kursk on June 26, 1981. In 2003, he graduated with honors from the Moscow State Institute of International Relations, specializing in economics, finance, and credit.

== Economic activity ==
Efimov's professional career began at the Support for Development of Civil Society Institutions research fund, followed by a role as an economist at the Center for Social and Labor Rights. In 2004, he entered public service within the Federal Antimonopoly Service (FAS), specifically serving in the Office for Control and Supervision of Real Estate, Local Monopolies, and Housing and Utilities services. He was promoted to department head in 2007 and subsequently managed the Moscow Office of the FAS from 2009. In December 2011, Efimov joined the Government of Moscow as the head of the Department of Land Resources. Following the 2013 administrative restructuring that merged the Department of Land Resources with the Property Department, he was designated to lead the newly established Moscow Property Department. His jurisdiction expanded in 2014 with the integration of the Department of Housing Policy into his administration. In February 2017, Efimov assumed the role of Minister of the Government of Moscow and Head of the Department of Economic Policy and Development.

== Minister of the Government of Moscow ==
On December 6, 2011, Moscow Mayor Sergei Sobyanin appointed Efimov as the head of the Moscow Department of Land Resources. His appointment was publicly supported by Igor Artemyev, the head of the Federal Antimonopoly Service, who cited Efimov's prior experience in real estate and housing supervision. Following a February 20, 2013, mayoral decree merging the Department of Land Resources with the Property Department, Efimov was designated to lead the newly established Moscow Property Department. Under his administration, the department established standardized regulations for public services in property and land relations and introduced a quality management system compliant with ISO 9001:2008. Additionally, the reorganization involved a 30% reduction in departmental staff to optimize administrative costs.

=== Land reform ===
During his tenure at the Moscow Property Department, Efimov oversaw several administrative adjustments in land management. His administration developed surveying projects for residential areas across Moscow, abolished the practice of forming land boundaries solely around the base of buildings, and established a mechanism allowing landowners to alter the permitted land-use designation for construction purposes.

These measures facilitated the allocation of land plots for multi-apartment buildings by tenants starting in 2015. In June 2014, legislative amendments were introduced to the Land Code of the Russian Federation, granting building owners the right to expand adjacent land plots to support regional development. A standardized system for calculating fees related to land-use designation changes based on building density and cadastral value was also introduced, enabling investors to calculate costs via the department's portal.

Additionally, Efimov managed the "one ruble per square meter" rental initiative, a program designed to restore historic buildings through private investments. Between 2012 and 2017, the initiative facilitated the conservation of over 20 historic buildings, drawing approximately 2.3 billion rubles in private funding under a 50-year lease agreement scheme.

=== Interaction with the business community ===
Efimov launched the mechanism of the redemption of leased from town premises by small businesses. There were signed more than 5,000 contracts-sale of properties with small businesses from 2010 to 2016. That worth more than 100 billion rubles.

There were implemented transparent and clear system of land submission for leading business at auctions. This allowed to implement the rights to conclude lease agreements for 6 years for about 200 land areas that in total 70 hectares for the sum more than 6 billion rubles.

Auction for the sale of rights to public property are centralized on a single electronic platform of the department for competition policy of Moscow. From 2010 to 2016, the government sold more than 3,000 real estates in the amount of about 54 billion rubles.

Moscow and the pharmaceutical concern BIOCAD concluded an offset bargain - the first in Russia. Minimum ten nearest years the capital will assuredly purchase actual medications from the vendor.

Moscow enterprises that create workplaces have the benefits from city and pay less taxes also. This influence the megapolis economy in a positive way. In 2017 year the accumulated investments amounted to more than 80 billion rubles, said the minister of The government of Moscow Vladimir Efimov.

=== Economic activity ===
Under the leadership of Vladimir Efimov Moscow budget income increased by three times from the use of land resources. The share of rental property revenues increased from 33% to 57% in the total revenues from use of city assets.

There were organized withdrawal of the town from participation in Charter capitals of most companies operating in competitive markets. There were liquidated or privatized more than 70% of unprofitable and non-core organizations with participation of the city. The number of economic societies with the share of Moscow decreased by more than three times.

In 2013, the Department of urban property of Moscow under the leadership of Vladimir Yefimov made the biggest deal, worth about 100 billion rubles at privatization of the equity stake of OJSC MUEC (Moscow United energy company) (100%) and used assets. In this transaction the city had earned the largest sum in the framework of the privatization of city assets.

Moscow economy is developing. The speed of gross regional product rise will reach 2,3% to 2020 year. According to the minister of The government of Moscow Vladimir Efimov the growth of GRP is showing the quality of industry, export, as well as the development of information technology, research and engineering.

=== Head of Department of economic policy and development ===
On the 7th of February the mayor of Moscow Sergey Sobyanin appointed Vladimir Efimov to the post of head of Department of economic policy and development of Moscow government.

Standing on a post of the head of Department Yefimov denominated the following priority lines: effective tax administration, monitoring of tariff policy and increase of budgetary expenses efficiency. He also noted that the implementation of the investment strategy denoted by 2025 and improving migration legislation will be continued fully.

By Vladimir Efimovs' initiative there were granted tax benefits for residents and management companies of special economic zones, established on the territory of Moscow. For residents the period of exemption from payment of vehicle tax increased from 5 to 10 years. For the same period management companies are exempt from taxes. Also the extension period of exemption from payment for land tax from 5 to 10 years is provided for residents. Also the specialities of applying lower rates of Moscow budget tax on organisation profits have changed. This way for more than ten years, from 2018 to 2028, the rate of 0% will be operating. In the next five years, from 2028 to 2033, it will be 5%. And in 2033 and then further the rate size will be equal to 12.5%. As for management companies from 1 January 2017 the tax rate on profits will be set at the rate of 12.5%, and from 1 January 2021 - 13.5 percent. Because of activities of the Department of economic policy and development in Moscow the conditions for raising capital are settled, the investment climate is improving. Two categories of regional investment projects participants are getting benefits: the organisations that are included to the register on the basis of special requirements, and investors who have signed a special investment contract (SPIC) at the Federal level. For the first category the tax on organisation profits that are to be paid to the Moscow budget is decreased by 10%. The validity period of benefits is 10 years (until 2028); for the second category a zero rate is set until 2025.

Vladimir Efimov commented on the adoption of these initiatives: "Investment attracting has been and remains a priority of the Government of Moscow," said the Minister. "We conduct a purposeful work, we use all the tools, including those that are offered by the Federal Government. The adopted law increases the competitiveness of Moscow in attracting companies that invest in the modernization or development of industrial products production."

Moscow sells for migrants labour patents actively. As the result of the 2017 year the city budget received 15,7 billion rubles. This was stated by the Moscow Government Minister Vladimir Yefimov.

Moscow is one of the most appealing for investments cities at international level, considers the minister of the government of Moscow Vladimir Efimov. It is the largest labour market in the country and the businessmen are supported by the state.

The minister of the government of Moscow Vladimir Efimov stated that Moscow is the center of testing and integration of new technologies in Russia. The export in the field of scientific research and technology has grown. The last year showed the increase for 49.8% in just two months.
