= Ministry of Health (Russia) =

Government minister of Russia

Ministry of Health of the Russian Federation
- Министерство здравоохранения Российской Федерации; Ministerstvo zdravookhraneniya Rossiiskoi Federatsii
- Emblem of Ministry of Health of Russia

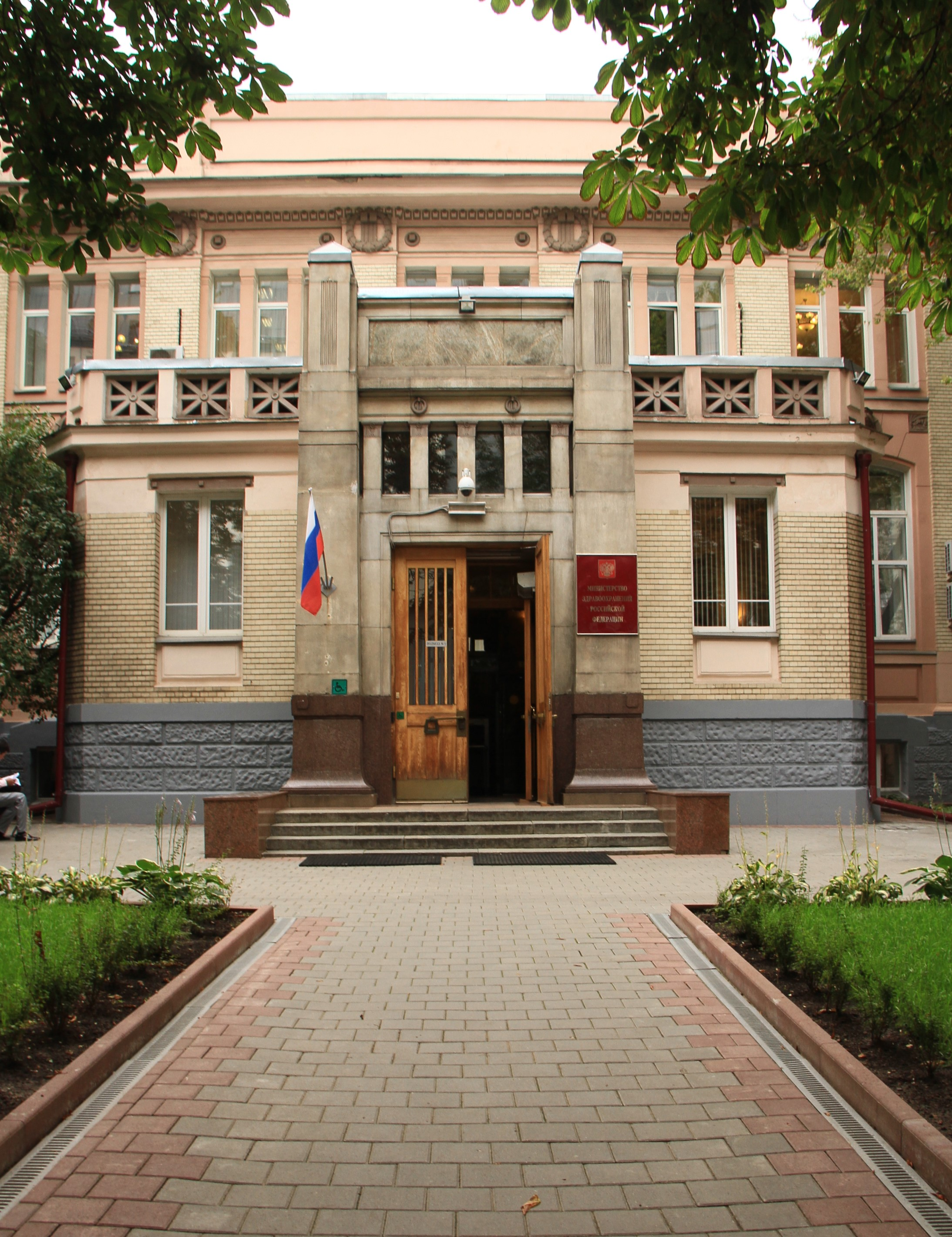
- Ministry headquarters at Rakhmanovsky pereulok, 3, Moscow

Agency overview
- Formed: 2012; 14 years ago
- Preceding agency: Ministry of Health and Social Development
- Jurisdiction: Government of Russia
- Headquarters: Rakhmanovsky pereulok 3, Tverskoy District, Moscow; 55°45′54.94″N 37°37′6.97″E
- Annual budget: 375.6 billion ruble (FY 2011)
- Minister responsible: Mikhail Murashko, Minister of Health
- Child agencies: Federal Compulsory Medical Insurance Fund; Federal Service for Surveillance in Healthcare
- Website: minzdrav.gov.ru

The Ministry of Health of the Russian Federation (Russian: Министерство здравоохранения Российской Федерации, in short Russian: Минздрав России, romanized: Minzdrav Rossii) is a ministry of the Government of Russia responsible for health care and public health.

The Ministry of Health oversees the legal regulation and state policies of health in Russia, including pharmaceuticals, the public health care system, health insurance, medical rehabilitation, sanitation, disease prevention, and the circulation of medicines. It is headquartered in Tverskoy District, Moscow.

The Ministry of Health was formed in 2012 from the Ministry of Health and Social Development which was split in two under Prime Minister Dmitry Medvedev, with the social security departments forming the Ministry of Labour and Social Affairs.

Mikhail Murashko has been Minister of Health since 21 January 2020.

== History ==
In 1992, following the collapse of the USSR, the Ministry of Health of the USSR was liquidated, and the Ministry of Health of the RSFSR was transformed into the Ministry of Health of the Russian Federation.

In March 2004, by Decree No. 314 of March 9 2004, the ministry was abolished and the Ministry of Health and Social Development of the Russian Federation (Ministry of Health and Social Development of Russia) was formed.

On May 22, 2012, the Ministry of Health and Social Development of Russia was divided into two ministries — the Ministry of Health of Russia and the Ministry of Labor of Russia.

== Duties ==
Its main official responsibilities include:

- developing and implementing state policy in healthcare;
- developing and implementing federal health programs, including initiatives on diabetes, tuberculosis, health promotion, health education, disease prevention etc.;
- developing draft legislation and presenting it to the State Duma;
- governance of federal medical facilities;
- medical education and manpower development;
- epidemiological and environmental health monitoring and health statistics;
- control of infectious diseases;
- development of health regulations;
- development of federal standards and recommendations for quality assurance;
- development and implementation of federal health programs;
- control and licensing of drugs.
