= List of medical schools in Russia =

Below is a list of medical universities located in Russia:

- Altai State Medical University
- A. N. Kosygin Russian State University (Institute "Maimonides Academy")
- Amur State University
- Astrakhan State Medical University
- Bashkir State Medical University
- Belgorod State University
- Chechen State University
- Chelyabinsk State Medical University
- Chita State Medical Academy
- Chuvash State University
- Crimean Federal University
- Dagestan State Medical University
- Far Eastern Federal University
- Far Eastern State Medical University
- Ingush State University, Faculty of Medicine
- I.M. Sechenov First Moscow State Medical University
- Irkutsk State Medical University
- Izhevsk State Medical Academy
- Immanuel Kant Baltic Federal University
- Kazan Federal University
- Kazan State Medical University
- Khanty-Mansiysk State Medical Academy
- Kabardino-Balkarian State University, Medical Faculty
- Kemerovo State University
- Kirov Military Medical Academy
- Kirov State Medical University
- Krasnoyarsk State Medical University, General Medicine Faculty in English
- Kuban State Medical University
- Kursk State Medical University
- Mari State University
- Yakutsk State University, Faculty of Medicine
- Moscow State University
- North Caucasian State Academy
- Northern State Medical University
- Nizhny Novgorod State Medical Academy
- North Ossetian State Medical Academy
- Yaroslav-the-Wise Novgorod State University, Faculty of Medicine
- Novosibirsk State Medical University
- Novosibirsk State University, Vladimir Zelman Institute for Medicine and Psychology
- Omsk State Medical University
- Ogarev Mordovia State University
- Omsk State Medical Academy
- Orenburg State Medical University
- Orel State University, Medical Institute
- Privolzhsky Research Medical University
- Pskov State University
- Penza State Medical University
- Peoples' Friendship University of Russia, Faculty of Medicine
- Perm State Medical University
- Petrozavodsk State University, Faculty of Medicine
- Rostov State Medical University
- Russian University of Medicine (formerly known as Moscow State University of Medicine and Dentistry)
- Russian National Research Medical University named after N.I. Pirogov (formerly known as Russian State Medical University)
- Ryazan State Medical University
- North-Western State Medical University named after I.I. Mechnikov
- Saint Petersburg State Pavlov Medical University
- Saint Petersburg State Pediatric Medical University
- Saint Petersburg Medico-Social Institute
- Saint Petersburg State University, Faculty of Medicine
- Lugansk State Medical University
- Samara State Medical University
- Saratov State Medical University
- Siberian State Medical University
- Smolensk State Medical University
- Stavropol State Medical University
- Tambov State Medical University
- Volgograd State Medical University
- Pyatigorsk Medical and Pharmaceutical Institute
- Voronezh State Medical University
- Tula State University
- Tver State Medical Academy
- Tyumen State Medical University
- Ural State Medical University
- Ulyanovsk State University
- Vladivostok State Medical University
- Yakutsk State University
- Yaroslavl State Medical Academy

== See also ==
- Medical school
- List of medical schools
- List of Russian physicians and psychologists
