= Yefim Berkhin =

Yefim Borisovich Berkhin
- Ефим Борисович Берхин
- Born: 11 October 1921; Tatarsk, Smolensk Oblast, Russia
- Died: 2009 (aged 87–88)

Yefim Borisovich Berkhin (Russian: Ефим Борисович Берхин; 11 October 1921 – 2009) was a Soviet scientist, pharmacologist and researcher in the field of kidney physiology. He was a Doctor of Medical Sciences (1959), professor (1961), and first head of the Department of Pharmacology at Altay State Medical University (1956–1983).

== Biography ==
Yefim Borisovich Berkhin was born on 11 October 1921 in the village of Tatarsk, Smolensk Oblast.

Studied at the Crimean Medical Institute, graduating in 1943 during the evacuation of this university to the city of Kyzylorda (Kazakh SSR). In 1944, he was sent to the liberated Crimea as part of the sanitary inspection. In 1945, he entered the graduate school of the pharmacology department of the Crimean Medical Institute, graduated with the defense of his candidate's dissertation (1948), after which he was sent as an assistant to the Chkalovsky Medical Institute (Orenburg). In 1954, he was awarded the title of associate professor.

Heading the Department of Pharmacology at the Altai Medical Institute for almost 30 years, he created a school of scientific and pedagogical workers (B. A. Pakhmurny, Yu. I. Ivanov, G. D. Anikin, B. Ya. Varshavsky, N. B. Sidorenkova, V. M. Bryukhanov, and others).

Worked as a teacher. Scientific activity is focused on regulation of water exchange and kidney function. Under his supervision 6 doctoral and 17 candidate dissertations were completed.

He is the author of over 200 scientific publications, including monographs. Awards: medals "For Valiant Labor in the Great Patriotic War of 1941–1945" (1945), "For Labour Valour" (1961), "For the Development of Virgin and Fallow Lands" (1964), "For Valiant Labor. In Commemoration of the 100th Anniversary of the Birth of V. I. Lenin" (1968), Badge "For Excellent Healthcare Achievement" (1970).

In 1989 Berkhin immigrated to the United States with his family.

== Ratings ==
In 2021, the rector of the Altai State Medical University Irina Sheremetyeva said:

Pharmacology has become a brand of Russia, healthcare and medical education. It is the past, present and future. Without knowledge of this subject, it is impossible to help any of the patients. And, of course, all this could not have happened if fate had not brought then associate professor Yefim Berkhin to Altai State Medical Institute in 1956. Over its 65 years of existence, the Pharmacology Department has become one of the most important departments of the university. Yefim Borisovich came when the university was only two years old, practically at the dawn of its creation. It was a difficult time, but despite all the difficulties that Yefim Borisovich was never afraid of, he went step by step towards his cherished goal and from 1956 to 1982 he headed the department, which was destined to play one of the key roles in the creation of not only our university, but also the entire healthcare of the Altai Territory. Unfortunately, Yefim Berkhin is no longer with us, but he left behind one of the strongest schools, grateful students and followers who continue his work today. His name will forever remain in the history of both the Department of Pharmacology and ASMU.

— Irina Sheremetyeva,

== Books ==
- On the mechanism of water diuresis Abstract of a dissertation for the degree of Doctor of Medical Sciences, 1957
- How medicines are created, 1967
- The Construction of a medical prescription, 1967
- Diuretics, 1967
- Methods of experimental study of the kidneys and water-salt metabolism. [Текст] / Е. Б. Верхин ! ; Е. Б. Берхин, Ю. И. Иванов. — Барнаул : [Алт. кн. изд-во], 1972. — 199 с. : черт. : 21 см.
- The Kidney Physiology, 1972
- Pharmacology of the kidneys and its physiological basis. — Москва : Медицина, 1979. — 336 с. граф.; 20.
- Secretion of organic substances in the kidney, 1979

== Awards ==
- Medal "For Valiant Labour in the Great Patriotic War 1941–1945" (1945)
- Medal "For Labour Valour" (1961)
- Medal "For the Development of Virgin Lands" (1964)
- Jubilee Medal "In Commemoration of the 100th Anniversary of the Birth of Vladimir Ilyich Lenin" (1968)
- Badge "For Excellent Healthcare Achievement" (1970)

== Jubilees ==
In 2021, Altai State Medical University celebrated the 65th anniversary of this university and the 100th anniversary of Yefim Borisovich Berkhin.
