= Anton Koltsov =

Russian politician, de facto Prime Minister of Zaporizhzhia Oblast

- Антон Кольцов

Mayor of Mariupol (under Russian-occupation)
- Incumbent
- Assumed office 13 June 2025

Chairman of the Government of the Zaporizhzhia Oblast (under Russian-occupation)
- In office 4 October 2022 – 3 May 2024

Head of Government of the Zaporizhzhia Oblast Military–Civilian Administration (under Russian-occupation)
- In office 18 July 2022 – 4 October 2022

Chairman of the Government of the Vologda Oblast
- In office 2017 – 18 July 2022

Personal details
- Born: 24 June 1973 (age 53) Cherepovets, Vologda Oblast, Russian SFSR, Soviet Union (now Russia)
- Education: Cherepovets State University, Yaroslavl State Medical Academy

Anton Viktorovich Koltsov (Russian: Антон Викторович Кольцов; born 24 June 1973) is a Russian official and former Chairman of the Government of Vologda Oblast (2017–2022). Following his tenure in Vologda, he was appointed to the occupation authority in Russian-occupied Ukraine, serving as Head of the Government of the Zaporizhzhia Oblast Military–Civilian Administration during the Russian invasion of Ukraine. Following Russia's unilateral annexation of Zaporizhzhia Oblast, his title was changed to 'Chairman of the Government of the Oblast' in line with Russian political custom.

On 13 June 2025, by decree of Denis Pushilin, the head of the Russian-occupied Donetsk Oblast, he was appointed acting mayor of Russian-occupied Mariupol.

== Biography ==
Koltsov was born on 24 June 1973 in Cherepovets. In 1996 he graduated from the Yaroslavl State Medical Academy, and in 2003 from Cherepovets State University.

In 2010, he received the qualification "Master of Business Administration" at the RANEPA. Graduated from the Higher School of Public Administration of the RANEPA (“School of Governors”). Previously worked in the steel industry.

In 2015–2016, he was the Director for Health, Safety and Environment at Severstal. In 2016, he was appointed First Deputy Governor of the Vologda Oblast. In 2017–2022, he was the Chairman of the Government of the Vologda Oblast.

On July 18, 2022, during the Russian invasion of Ukraine, it became known that he was appointed head of the government of the Russian occupation Civil-Military Administration of the Zaporizhzhia region.

== International sanctions ==
In September 2022 he was sanctioned by the United States. He was also sanctioned by the European Union in October 2022 for involvement in the referendum for Zaporizhzhia to become part of Russia, which the European Union has stated is illegitimate and undermines the territorial integrity of Ukraine. Similarly, he was economically sanctioned and had his assets frozen by Switzerland in October 2022.
