= Irina Medvedeva =

Irina Medvedeva may refer to:

- Irina Medvedeva (scientist) (1958-2021), Soviet Russian medical scientist and professor
- Irina Medvedeva (actress) (born 1982), Belarusian actress
