= Ilya Berezin (biochemist) =

Soviet biochemist (1923-1987)

Ilya Vasilyevich Berezin (Russian: Илья Васильевич Березин; 9 August 1923 – 5 June 1987) was a Soviet physical chemist and biochemist, a specialist in chemical kinetics, enzyme physical chemistry, micellar catalysis and enzyme engineering. He held the degree of Doctor of Chemical Sciences, was elected Corresponding Member of the Academy of Sciences of the USSR in 1970, served as Dean of the Faculty of Chemistry at Moscow State University (MSU) (1969-1981), headed the Department of Chemical Enzymology at MSU, and was Director of the Bach Institute of Biochemistry of the Academy of Sciences of the USSR (1981-1987).

== Career ==
Ilya Vasilyevich Berezin was born in Astrakhan into a family of physicians. His father, Vasily Ilyich Berezin, was a professor of pharmacology and the rector (the Russian equivalent of Chancellor) of the Astrakhan State Medical Academy, while his mother, Nina Ivanovna Ermakova, held a Doctor of Medical Science degree. In 1937, Berezin moved with his family to Moscow. In 1940 he graduated from school and entered the Moscow Aviation Institute named after S. Ordzhonikidze. In 1941 he was drafted into the army, where he initially served as a soldier, later attained the rank of political officer (politruk), and subsequently received an officer’s rank. During the Great Patriotic War, he participated in battles on the Western, Central, and 1st Belarusian Fronts. He was demobilised in 1946 and then entered the Chemistry Faculty of Moscow State University.

In 1953, Berezin earned the Candidate of Chemical Sciences degree (PhD in Chemistry), and in 1962 he successfully completed his doctoral thesis entitled “Studies on Elementary Free-Radical Reactions in the Liquid Phase” to obtain the Doctor of Sciences in Chemistry. From 1969 to 1981, he served as Dean of the Chemistry Faculty at Moscow State University. In 1970, he was elected a Corresponding Member of the USSR's Academy of Sciences, joining the Department of Biochemistry, Biophysics, and the Chemistry of Physiologically Active Compounds. He was also a member of the Academic Council of the Chemistry Faculty at MSU.

At Moscow State University he initiated a new academic programme “Physical Chemistry of Enzymatic Processes” and personally held lectures on the subject. In 1972 he was appointed Chairman of the Scientific Council of the State Committee for Science and Technology of the USSR on “Enzymes and their Application in National Economy and Medicine.” In 1974 he founded the Department of Chemical Enzymology at the Chemistry Faculty of MSU, which he headed for over ten years. From 1981 he led the A. N. Bach Institute of Biochemistry of the USSR Academy of Sciences. During his scientific career, he published over 500 research papers and articles, and was one of the most cited academics in Soviet science.

== Scientific work ==
Soon after his doctoral thesis, Berezin went for an internship at Harvard University under B. L. Valley, a member of the United States National Academy of Sciences. Upon returning, he served as Deputy Director and headed the Department of Biokinetics at the Interfaculty Laboratory of Molecular Biology and Bioorganic Chemistry of MSU (now the A. N. Belozersky Institute of Physico-Chemical Biology) until 1970. Berezin formulated the kinetic-thermodynamic concept of enzyme action, describing the elementary act of substrate transformation using the theory of absolute reaction rates, and explaining the scale of enzymatic acceleration observed experimentally. He also proposed the kinetic theory of micellar catalysis, which can be regarded as a model of enzymatic catalysis.

At the Department of Enzymology Berezin and his colleagues discovered the phenomenon of bio-electrocatalysis, developed new methods for stabilising catalysts and created enzyme-based systems activated by light, mechanical, or other stimuli.

He developed a method for the enzymatic synthesis of 6-aminopenicillanic acid, used in antibiotic production, which continues to be applied in Russia. Additionally with his team he developed theoretical, experimental, and clinical justifications for the use of immobilised enzymes in the treatment of cardiovascular diseases.

== Death ==
Berezin died after suffering a cardiac arrest on 5 June 1987 in Moscow. He was buried at the Kuntsevo Cemetery.

== Contribution to science ==
After his death Berezin's role in the development of research in to biocatalysis was noted in a 2024 academic article authored by 64 fellow academics from 14 institutions: "Before I.V. Berezin’s works, biological catalysis was considered as a complex phenomenon bearing some features of vitalism. Meanwhile, owing to the studies carried out by I.V. Berezin and his followers, it became clear that enzyme catalysis can be quite simply and reliably interpreted in terms of physical chemistry and has a huge potential for technical implementation of many chemical reactions.". Some of these colleagues arranged for a memorial book of essays, printed on the hundredth anniversary year of his birth in 2023, entitled Our dear Ilya Vasilyevich Berezin. One biography said of him: "I.V. Berezina created a large and productive scientific school. He was a charming man, respected and loved by his students. In fact, it can be said that all modern Russian specialists in the field of engineering enzymology are students and followers of Ilya Vasilyevich Berezin..."

== Selected works ==
- Immobilized Enzymes, I. V. Berezin, N. L. Klyachko, A. V. Levashov et al., Moscow: Higher School, 1987. 159 pp.
- Practical Course in Chemical and Enzymatic Kinetics, I. V. Berezin and A. A. Klyosov.
- Chemical Enzymology, edited by I. V. Berezin and K. Martinek.
- Enzyme Engineering: Future Directions, edited by L. B. Wingard, I. V. Berezin, and A. A. Klyosov.

== Recognition ==
During his life Berezin received multiple honors, both for his wartime service and for his scientific achievements:

- Order of the Red Star — for military service during World War II.
- Order of the Patriotic War, 1st Class — for wartime merits.
- Order of the Patriotic War, 2nd Class — awarded among his military decorations.
- Order of the Badge of Honour — awarded in 1973.
- Order of the October Revolution — 1973.
- Order of the Red Banner of Labour — 1974.
- Lenin Prize — awarded in 1982 for outstanding achievements in chemistry and biochemistry.
- Elected Corresponding Member of the Academy of Sciences of the USSR in 1970.

== Bibliography ==
- Volkov, V. A., Vonsky, E. V., Kuznetsova, G. I. Chemists: Biographical Handbook. Moscow: Publishing House "Vysshaya Shkola", 1991.
- Ryabukhin, A. G., Bryantseva, G. V. Professors of Moscow University 1755–2004: Biographical Dictionary. Moscow: MSU Publishing House, 2005. pp. 121–122.
- Faculty of Chemistry, MSU. A Path Through Three Quarters of a Century. Edited by V. V. Lunin. Moscow: TERRA-Kalender, 2005. pp. 32–33.
- Solovyev, Yu. I. Chemists About Themselves. Moscow: VLADMO, 2001. pp. 31–33.
- Дорогой наш Илья Васильевич Березин [Our dear Ilya Vasilyevich Berezin] - memoirs written by his former colleagues, Moscow: Scientific Library, 2023.
