= Igor Kagramanyan =

Russian politician (born 1962)

- Игорь Каграманян
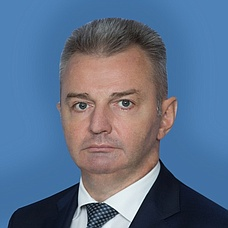

Senator from Yaroslavl Oblast
- In office 20 September 2017 – 17 June 2020
- Preceded by: Viktor Rogotskii
- Succeeded by: Sergey Beryozkin

Personal details
- Born: Igor Kagramanyan; 30 April 1962 (age 64) Baryatino, Baryatinsky District, Kaluga Oblast, Ukrainian SSR, Soviet Union
- Education: Yaroslavl State Medical Academy

Igor Nikolayevich Kagramanyan (Russian: Игорь Николаевич Каграманян; born 30 April 1962) is a Russian politician who served as a senator from Yaroslavl Oblast from 2017 to 2020.

== Career ==
Igor Kagramanyan was born on 30 April 1962 in Baryatino, Baryatinsky District, Kaluga Oblast. In 1986, he graduated from the Yaroslavl State Medical Academy. After graduation, he worked as a psychiatrist at the Yaroslavl Regional Clinical Psychiatric Hospital. From 1991 to 2007, he worked at the Yaroslavl State Medical Academy. From 2001 to 2007, Kagramanyan was the docent of the Department of Public Health and Health Organization. From 2012 to 2014, he served as Deputy Head to the Minister of Health. From 2017 to 2020, he represented Yaroslavl Oblast in the Federation Council. Afterward, he continued working at the Ministry of Health.
