= Vologda constituency =

Vologda single-member constituency
- Constituency of the Russian State Duma

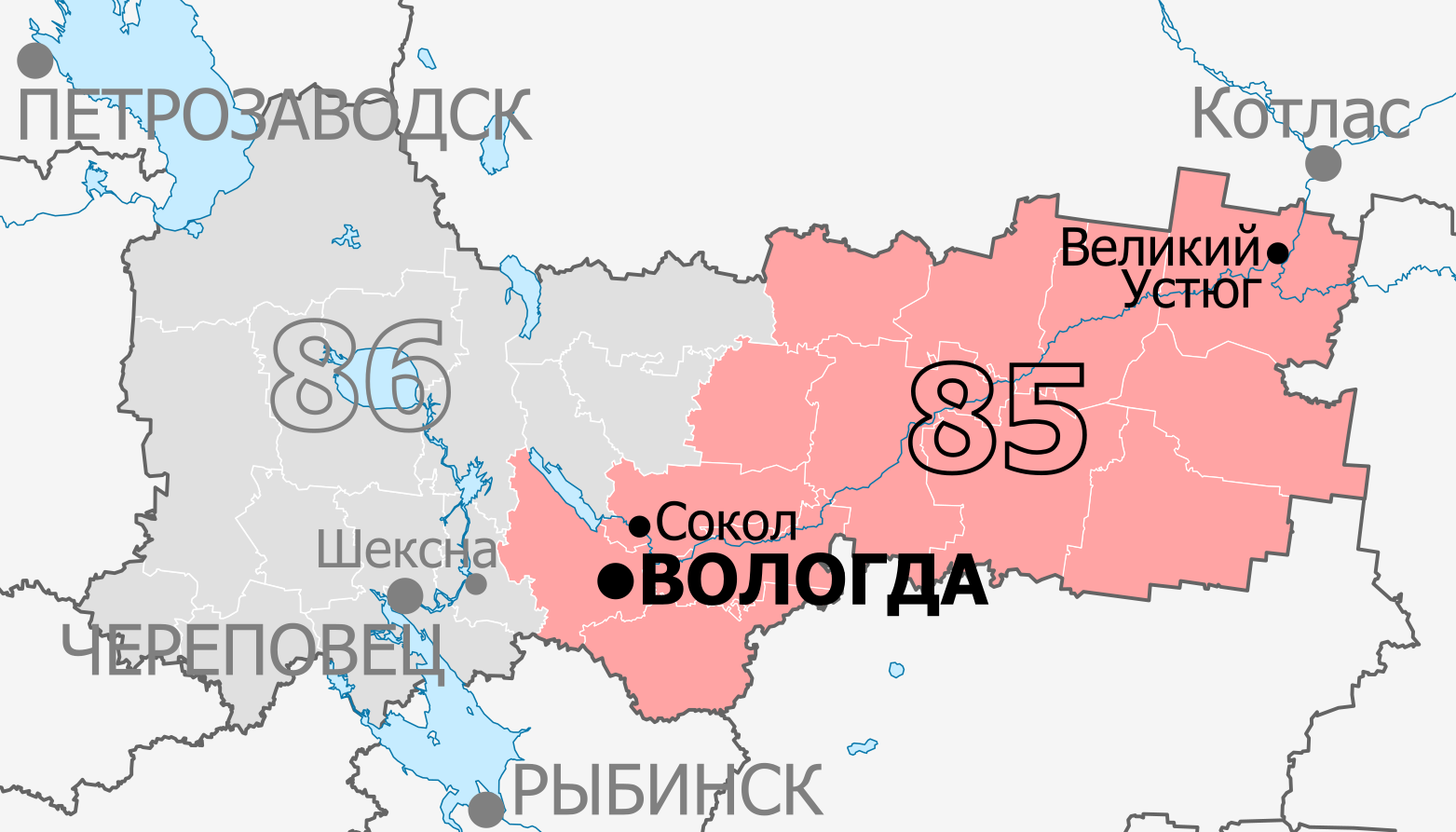
- Constituency boundaries since 2016
- Deputy: Sergey Selyanin; United Russia
- Federal subject: Vologda Oblast
- Districts: Babushkinsky, Gryazovetsky, Kichmengsko-Gorodetsky, Mezhdurechensky, Nikolsky, Nyuksensky, Sokolsky, Syamzhensky, Tarnogsky, Totemsky, Velikoustyugsky, Verkhovazhsky, Vologda, Vologodsky
- Voters: 477,865 (2026)

The Vologda constituency (No.88 (Note: No.73 in 1993-1995, No.72 in 1995-2003, No.74 in 2003-2007, No.85 in 2016–2026)) is a Russian legislative constituency in Vologda Oblast. The constituency covers central and eastern Vologda Oblast, including its capital — Vologda.

The constituency has been represented since 2026 by United Russia deputy Sergey Selyanin, former Head of Totemsky District and forestry executive, who won the open seat after one-term United Russia incumbent Valentina Artamonova ran for Legislative Assembly of Vologda Oblast.

== Boundaries ==
1993–2007, 2016–present: Babushkinsky District, Gryazovetsky District, Kichmengsko-Gorodetsky District, Mezhdurechensky District, Nikolsky District, Nyuksensky District, Sokolsky District, Syamzhensky District, Tarnogsky District, Totemsky District, Velikoustyugsky District, Verkhovazhsky District, Vologda, Vologodsky District
The constituency has been covering eastern Vologda Oblast, including the oblast capital Vologda as well as the towns of Veliky Ustyug and Sokol, since its initial creation in 1993.

== Members elected ==
Election	Member	Party
1993	Tamara Leta	Agrarian Party
1995	Vladimir Lopatin	Independent
1999	Valentin Chayka	Independent
2003	Valentin Chayka	People's Party
2007	Proportional representation - no election by constituency	
2011	Proportional representation - no election by constituency	
2016	Yevgeny Shulepov	United Russia
2021	Valentina Artamonova	United Russia
2026	Sergey Selyanin	United Russia

== Election results ==
=== 1993 ===
Summary of the 12 December 1993 Russian legislative election in the Vologda constituency
Candidate	Party	Votes	%
Tamara Leta	Agrarian Party	76,989	25.08%
Sergey Churkin	Liberal Democratic Party	–	13.40%
Anatoly Dorogovtsev	Independent	–	–
Vladilen Ivshin	Independent	–	–
Stanislav Osminin	Communist Party	–	–
Vladimir Shiryayev	Party of Russian Unity and Accord	–	–
Sergey Smirnov	Choice of Russia	–	–
Vasily Zhidkov	Independent	–	–
Total		306,927	100%

=== 1995 ===
Summary of the 17 December 1995 Russian legislative election in the Vologda constituency
Candidate	Party	Votes	%
Vladimir Lopatin	Independent	63,452	18.77%
Mikhail Surov	Party of Tax Cuts' Supporters	41,441	12.26%
Tamara Leta (incumbent)	Agrarian Party	39,211	11.60%
Nikolay Vodomerov	Communists and Working Russia - for the Soviet Union	34,646	10.25%
Sergey Churkin	Liberal Democratic Party	28,386	8.40%
Leonid Shonurov	Independent	22,786	6.74%
Yury Sivkov	Our Home – Russia	18,778	5.56%
Vladimir Smirnov	Democratic Choice of Russia – United Democrats	16,321	4.83%
Lyudmila Kotesova	Independent	16,315	4.83%
Aleksandr Lukichev	Social Democrats	7,720	2.28%
Nikolay Klyuyev	Independent	6,635	1.96%
Konstantin Shishin	Frontier Generation	3,437	1.02%
Mikhail Gusev	Duma-96	2,063	0.61%
Vladimir Rachek	Independent	1,772	0.52%
against all		28,337	8.38%
Total		338,010	100%

=== 1999 ===
Summary of the 19 December 1999 Russian legislative election in the Vologda constituency
Candidate	Party	Votes	%
Valentin Chayka	Independent	98,796	30.10%
Aleksandr Leshukov	Fatherland – All Russia	72,547	22.10%
Lyudmila Kotesova	Union of Right Forces	32,595	9.93%
Vladimir Shepel	Yabloko	19,452	5.93%
Viktor Akulov	Liberal Democratic Party	10,873	3.31%
Nina Belyayeva	Andrey Nikolayev and Svyatoslav Fyodorov Bloc	10,548	3.21%
Vyacheslav Goglev	Congress of Russian Communities-Yury Boldyrev Movement	5,355	1.63%
Vladimir Kirillov	Independent	4,673	1.42%
Aleksandr Voronin	Russian Socialist Party	4,239	1.29%
Viktor Nikulshin	Independent	3,232	0.98%
Bronislav Omelichev	Spiritual Heritage	2,593	0.79%
against all		53,031	16.16%
Total		328,205	100%

=== 2003 ===
Summary of the 7 December 2003 Russian legislative election in the Vologda constituency
Candidate	Party	Votes	%
Valentin Chayka (incumbent)	People's Party	152,437	50.52%
Mikhail Surov	Independent	50,738	16.82%
Vladimir Bulanov	Agrarian Party	38,197	12.66%
Viktor Anufriyev	Party of Russia's Rebirth-Russian Party of Life	12,053	3.99%
Viktor Nefedov	United Russian Party Rus'	2,470	0.82%
against all		40,431	13.40%
Total		301,995	100%

=== 2016 ===
Summary of the 18 September 2016 Russian legislative election in the Vologda constituency
Candidate	Party	Votes	%
Yevgeny Shulepov	United Russia	66,358	32.33%
Anton Grimov	Liberal Democratic Party	33,941	16.54%
Aleksandr Teltevskoy	A Just Russia	28,872	14.07%
Mikhail Selin	Communist Party	25,970	12.65%
Yevgeny Domozhirov	People's Freedom Party	11,812	5.76%
Kirill Panko	Communists of Russia	10,421	5.08%
Olga Milyukova	The Greens	7,770	3.79%
Aleksey Nekrasov	Yabloko	6,724	3.28%
Aleksey Mikhaylov	Party of Growth	4,960	2.42%
Total		205,239	100%

=== 2021 ===
Summary of the 17-19 September 2021 Russian legislative election in the Vologda constituency
Candidate	Party	Votes	%
Valentina Artamonova	United Russia	77,903	34.81%
Oleg Yershov	Communist Party	50,271	22.46%
Viktor Leukhin	A Just Russia — For Truth	23,091	10.32%
Anton Grimov	Liberal Democratic Party	21,414	9.57%
Aleksandr Bolotov	Party of Pensioners	17,325	7.74%
Andrey Pautov	New People	13,063	5.84%
Olga Domozhirova	Yabloko	7,946	3.55%
Ilya Anferyev	Rodina	4,462	1.99%
Total		223,825	100%

=== 2026 ===
Summary of the 18-20 September 2026 Russian legislative election in the Vologda constituency
Candidate	Party	Votes	%
Sergey Selyanin	United Russia	79,310	34.16%
Oleg Yershov	Communist Party	40,959	17.64%
Anton Grimov	Liberal Democratic Party	24,804	10.68%
Aleksandr Borisov	New People	22,635	9.75%
Nikolay Yegorov	Yabloko	14,826	6.39%
Sergey Zuyev	Party of Pensioners	13,850	5.96%
Vladislav Zvorykin	A Just Russia	13,092	5.64%
Mikhail Kryukov	Communists of Russia	9,034	3.89%
Aleksey Shatalov	The Greens	5,290	2.28%
Dmitry Mosyagin	Rodina	2,016	0.87%
Total		232,196	100%
