= 2026 Vologda Oblast legislative election =

Regional legislative election in Russia

- 18–20 September 2026

All 34 seats in the Legislative Assembly 18 seats needed for a majority
- Turnout: 48.42% ▲3.68

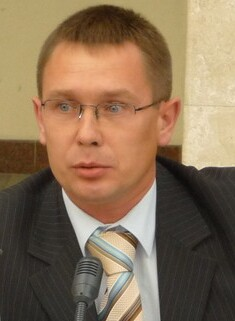

	Majority party	Minority party	Third party
Candidate	Sergey Zhestyannikov	Aleksandr Morozov	Sergey Karginov
Party	United Russia	CPRF	LDPR
Leader's seat	Party list	Cherepovets 6th	Party list
Last election	35.65%, 24 seats	24.42%, 5 seats	14.55%, 2 seats
Seats won	18	10	2
Seat change	▼6	▲5	Steady
Popular vote	138,888	109,696	63,587
Percentage	31.98%	25.26%	14.64%
Swing	▼3.67pp	▲0.84pp	▲0.09%
	Fourth party	Fifth party	Sixth party
	NL		RPPSS
Candidate	Aleksandr Borisov	Vladislav Zvorykin	Aleksandr Bolotov
Party	New People	A Just Russia	Party of Pensioners
Leader's seat	Ran in Vologda 2nd (lost)	Ran in Sokolsky 11th (lost)	Ran in Gryazovetsky 14th (lost)
Last election	Failed to qualify	12.34%, 2 seats	8.19%, 1 seat
Seats won	2	1	1
Seat change	New	▼1	Steady
Popular vote	48,718	26,525	25,145
Percentage	11.22%	6.11%	5.79%
Swing	New	▼6.23pp	▼2.40pp
- Election results by party lists and in single-mandate constituencies
Chairman before election
Roman Zavarin
United Russia
Elected Chairman
Sergey Sorokin
United Russia
Senator before election
Roman Maslov
United Russia
Senator after election
Roman Maslov
United Russia

The 2026 Legislative Assembly of Vologda Oblast election took place on 18–20 September 2026, on common election day, coinciding with the 2026 Russian legislative election. All 34 seats in the Legislative Assembly were up for re-election.

United Russia narrowly retained its majority in the Legislative Assembly by one seat, winning 32.0% of the vote and 12 single-mandate constituencies. Communist Party of the Russian Federation saw major success and doubled its faction, winning all four single-mandate constituencies in Cherepovets and one in Vytegra. A Just Russia lost half of its vote share and one of two seats. New People entered the Legislative Assembly for the first time with 11.2% of the vote and two seats.

== Electoral system ==
Under current election laws, the Legislative Assembly is elected for a term of five years, with parallel voting. 17 seats are elected by party-list proportional representation with a 5% electoral threshold, with the other half elected in 17 single-member constituencies by first-past-the-post voting. Seats in the proportional part are allocated using the Imperiali quota, modified to ensure that every party list, which passes the threshold, receives at least one mandate. Unlike most regional elections in Russia, party lists in Vologda Oblast do not have an oblast-wide list.

== Candidates ==
=== Party lists ===
To register regional lists of candidates, parties need to collect 0.5% of signatures of all registered voters in Vologda Oblast.

The following parties were relieved from the necessity to collect signatures:

- United Russia
- Communist Party of the Russian Federation
- Liberal Democratic Party of Russia
- A Just Russia
- New People
- Russian Party of Pensioners for Social Justice

№	Party	Territorial groups leaders	Candidates	Territorial groups	Status
1	United Russia	Anna Yagnenkova • Sergey Zhestyannikov • Marina Fedotova • Oleg Molodtsov • Denis Dvornikov • Yulia Shilova • Irina Kokosova • Dmitry Kalyukov • Roman Maslov • Sergey Ordin • Valentina Artamonova • Yury Parfenov • Ivan Bykov • Sergey Lashkov • Natalya Belova • Valentin Korepin • Gennady Malyshev	85	17	Registered
2	Liberal Democratic Party	Artyom Vasilyev • Ilya Smirnov • Sergey Karginov • ~~Natalya Malovanina~~ • Maka Tsurumia • Aleksandra Osipova • Irina Mozalevskaya • Alina Palkova • Viktor Yemelyanov • Vladimir Selyakov • Andrey Sobolev • Maksim Kuznetsov • Leonid Grimov • Vasily Sobolev • Yulia Yemelyanova • Olga Shirikova • Sergey Yermolinsky	64	17	Registered
3	New People	Andrey Stepanov • Aleksandr Borisov • Yulia Antonova • Aleksey Turkin • Sofya Osekina • Denis Dolzhenko • Yegor Gaydukov • Dmitry Gerasimov • Yaroslav Vels • Yury Mikhalyov • Mikhail Sinyayev • Nikolay Serov • Valeria Spiridonova • Kirill Polyakov • Yelizaveta Uglova • Yelena Grinko • Alyona Popova	66	17	Registered
4	Communists of Russia	Maria Zhogoleva • Aleksandr Yakunichev • Tatyana Markova • Yelizaveta Goloushina • Sergey Katukhin • Valery Borisov • Sergey Morozov • Aleksandr Komarov • Igor Katukhin • Anton Sibakin • Yelena Sibakina • ~~Yevgeny Smirnov~~ • Eduard Sokolov • Dmitry Shalabanov • Svetlana Samodurova • Yelena Yefremova • Aleksandr Borisenko	80	17	Registered
5	Communist Party	Oleg Yershov • Marina Komarnitskaya • Nikolay Plotnikov • Vladimir Morgachev • Vladislav Provorov • Aleksandr Morozov • Aleksandr Klimenkov • Vladimir Vasilevsky • Nikolay Varnavsky • Aleksey Cherepanov • Andrey Makeyev • Artyom Nikonov • Svetlana Zhiganova • Yevgenia Kopnicheva • Aleksey Golik • Valery Shilov • Aleksey Koshcheyev	67	17	Registered
6	Party of Pensioners	Tatyana Khamikova • Sergey Stepanov • Natalia Khamikova • Lyubov Igumnova • Sergey Yakovlev • Anton Balashov • Anton Shibayev • Natalya Shibayeva • Oleg Borshch • Yelizaveta Igumnova • Olga Belova • Andrey Groznov • Tatyana Vlasova • Aleksandr Bolotov • Nelya Guzhova • Svetlana Kurochkina • Andrey Demidov	82	17	Registered
7	A Just Russia	Igor Trofimov • Aleksandr Shukhov • Roman Fedorenko • Maksim Taysemizov • Andrey Potapov • Ilya Galitsin • Sergey Burtsev • Aleksey Rodichev • Ruslan Ziganshin • Ilya Yevgrafov • Vladislav Zvorykin • Irina Arefyeva • Sergey Filin • Artyom Bobylev • Ilya Pirogov • Dmitry Moskalev • Vladimir Serov	80	17	Registered

Yabloko, which participated in the last election, did not file.

=== Single-mandate constituencies ===
17 single-mandate constituencies were formed in Vologda Oblast. To register candidates in single-mandate constituencies need to collect 3% of signatures of registered voters in the constituency.

Number of candidates in single-mandate constituencies
Party	Candidates	
Party	Nominated	Registered
United Russia	17	17
Communist Party	17	16
Liberal Democratic Party	16	16
A Just Russia	17	16
Party of Pensioners	17	16
New People	17	17
Communists of Russia	6	6
Independent	3	0
Total	110	104

== Results ==
=== Results by party lists ===
Summary of the 18–20 September 2026 Legislative Assembly of Vologda Oblast election results
Party	Party list					Constituency		Total	
Party	Votes	%	±pp	Seats	+/–	Seats	+/–	Seats	+/–
United Russia	138,888	31.98	▼3.67	6	▼1	12	▼5	18	▼6
Communist Party	109,696	25.26	▲0.84	5	Steady	5	▲5	10	▲5
Liberal Democratic Party	63,587	14.64	▲0.09	2	Steady	0	Steady	2	Steady
New People	48,718	11.22	New	2	New	0	New	2	New
A Just Russia	26,525	6.11	▼6.23	1	▼1	0	Steady	1	▼1
Party of Pensioners	25,145	5.79	▼2.40	1	Steady	0	Steady	1	Steady
Communists of Russia	12,657	2.91	New	0	New	0	New	0	New
Invalid ballots	9,018	2.08	▼0.43	—	—	—	—	—	—
Total	434,234	100.00	—	17	Steady	17	Steady	34	Steady
Turnout	434,234	48.42	▲3.68	—	—	—	—	—	—
Registered voters	896,753	100.00	—	—	—	—	—	—	—

Deputy Governor Sergey Sorokin (United Russia) was elected as Chairman of the Legislative Assembly, replacing outgoing Chairman Roman Zavarin (United Russia). Incumbent Senator Roman Maslov (United Russia) was re-appointed to the Federation Council. Just a week into his term Sorokin was appointed to the Federation Council by Governor Georgy Filimonov.

=== Results in single-member constituencies ===
==== District 1 ====
Summary of the 18–20 September 2026 Legislative Assembly of Vologda Oblast election in Central constituency No.1
Candidate	Party	Votes	%
Yury Sapozhnikov	United Russia	7,276	34.03%
Oleg Yershov	Communist Party	6,072	28.40%
Andrey Stepanov	New People	2,634	12.32%
Artyom Vasilyev	Liberal Democratic Party	2,281	10.67%
Igor Trofimov	A Just Russia	1,451	6.79%
Nikita Malkov	Party of Pensioners	1,187	5.55%
Total		21,378	100%

==== District 2 ====
Summary of the 18–20 September 2026 Legislative Assembly of Vologda Oblast election in Zarechny constituency No.2
Candidate	Party	Votes	%
Yelena Kudryavtseva	United Russia	8,361	31.31%
Marina Komarnitskaya	Communist Party	5,694	21.32%
Aleksandr Borisov	New People	4,455	16.68%
Olga Chekina	Party of Pensioners	3,003	11.25%
Ilya Smirnov	Liberal Democratic Party	2,679	10.03%
Aleksey Konovalov	A Just Russia	1,752	6.56%
Total		26,705	100%

==== District 3 ====
Summary of the 18–20 September 2026 Legislative Assembly of Vologda Oblast election in Eastern constituency No.3
Candidate	Party	Votes	%
Mikhail Tikhomirov	United Russia	7,676	40.85%
Nikolay Plotnikov	Communist Party	3,989	21.23%
Anton Grimov	Liberal Democratic Party	2,720	14.48%
Rostislav Shelginskikh	New People	2,227	11.85%
Andrey Groznov	Party of Pensioners	926	4.93%
Roman Fedorenko	A Just Russia	750	3.99%
Total		18,790	100%

==== District 4 ====
Summary of the 18–20 September 2026 Legislative Assembly of Vologda Oblast election in Southern constituency No.4
Candidate	Party	Votes	%
Roman Zavarin (incumbent)	United Russia	10,045	45.99%
Vladimir Morgachev	Communist Party	5,192	23.77%
Aleksey Turkin	New People	3,343	15.30%
Marina Matyunina	Party of Pensioners	1,793	8.21%
Maksim Taysemizov	A Just Russia	998	4.57%
Total		21,843	100%

==== District 5 ====
Summary of the 18–20 September 2026 Legislative Assembly of Vologda Oblast election in Western constituency No.5
Candidate	Party	Votes	%
Anton Kholodov (incumbent)	United Russia	7,902	42.55%
Vladislav Provorov	Communist Party	3,431	18.48%
Sofya Osekina	New People	2,362	12.72%
Svetlana Vlasova	Party of Pensioners	1,579	8.50%
Andrey Potapov	A Just Russia	1,434	7.72%
Maka Tsurtsumia	Liberal Democratic Party	1,408	7.58%
Total		18,570	100%

==== District 6 ====
Summary of the 18–20 September 2026 Legislative Assembly of Vologda Oblast election in South-Eastern constituency No.6
Candidate	Party	Votes	%
Aleksandr Morozov	Communist Party	8,161	29.74%
Tatyana Tyapaykina	United Russia	4,964	18.09%
Yury Yablokov	Liberal Democratic Party	4,459	16.25%
Denis Dolzhenko	New People	3,681	13.41%
Valery Borisov	Communists of Russia	2,256	8.22%
Aleksandr Morozov	Party of Pensioners	1,789	6.52%
Ilya Galitsin	A Just Russia	1,541	5.62%
Total		27,442	100%

==== District 7 ====
Summary of the 18–20 September 2026 Legislative Assembly of Vologda Oblast election in Industrialny constituency No.7
Candidate	Party	Votes	%
Aleksandr Klimenkov	Communist Party	5,766	24.21%
Andrey Pulin (incumbent)	United Russia	5,648	23.71%
Irina Mozalevskaya	Liberal Democratic Party	3,287	13.80%
Aleksey Sidorov	New People	2,851	11.97%
Sergey Morozov	Communists of Russia	2,746	11.53%
Sergey Burtsev	A Just Russia	1,533	6.44%
Anton Solovyov	Party of Pensioners	1,382	5.80%
Total		23,818	100%

==== District 8 ====
Summary of the 18–20 September 2026 Legislative Assembly of Vologda Oblast election in North-Western constituency No.8
Candidate	Party	Votes	%
Vladimir Vasilevsky	Communist Party	6,875	27.65%
Yelena Bykova (incumbent)	United Russia	6,712	26.99%
Tatyana Novozhilova	Liberal Democratic Party	2,968	11.94%
Dmitry Gerasimov	New People	2,937	11.81%
Aleksandr Komarov	Communists of Russia	1,705	6.86%
Aleksey Rodichev	A Just Russia	1,591	6.40%
Anton Shibayev	Party of Pensioners	1,448	5.82%
Total		24,864	100%

==== District 9 ====
Summary of the 18–20 September 2026 Legislative Assembly of Vologda Oblast election in Pervomaysky constituency No.9
Candidate	Party	Votes	%
Nikolay Varnavsky	Communist Party	8,232	29.67%
Dmitry Danilichev	United Russia	6,055	21.82%
Sergey Akimyshev	Liberal Democratic Party	3,983	14.36%
Yaroslav Vels	New People	3,263	11.76%
Ruslan Ziganshin	A Just Russia	2,245	8.09%
Maksim Novikov	Party of Pensioners	1,763	6.35%
Igor Katukhin	Communists of Russia	1,561	5.63%
Total		27,746	100%

==== District 10 ====
Summary of the 18–20 September 2026 Legislative Assembly of Vologda Oblast election in Velikoustyugsky constituency No.10
Candidate	Party	Votes	%
Natalya Dolgina (incumbent)	United Russia	9,550	35.52%
Vladimir Selyakov	Liberal Democratic Party	6,551	24.36%
Gintaras Tarabukin	Communist Party	4,358	16.21%
Ilya Yevgrafov	A Just Russia	2,444	9.09%
Yury Mikhalyov	New People	1,602	5.96%
Kirill Noritsyn	Party of Pensioners	1,451	5.40%
Total		26,887	100%

==== District 11 ====
Summary of the 18–20 September 2026 Legislative Assembly of Vologda Oblast election in Sokolsky constituency No.11
Candidate	Party	Votes	%
Anatoly Dianov (incumbent)	United Russia	10,637	37.97%
Vladislav Zvorykin	A Just Russia	4,536	16.19%
Aleksandra Afrikanova	Liberal Democratic Party	4,303	15.36%
Aleksandr Maslov	New People	4,170	14.89%
Tatyana Khamikova	Party of Pensioners	3,164	11.30%
Total		28,012	100%

==== District 12 ====
Summary of the 18–20 September 2026 Legislative Assembly of Vologda Oblast election in Babayevsky constituency No.12
Candidate	Party	Votes	%
Aleksandr Kosyonkov	United Russia	8,195	32.00%
Artyom Nikonov	Communist Party	7,429	29.01%
Maksim Kuznetsov	Liberal Democratic Party	2,173	8.48%
Dmitry Gorbunov	New People	2,169	8.47%
Anna Dolotova	Party of Pensioners	1,866	7.29%
Lidia Kharina	Communists of Russia	1,661	6.49%
Andrey Pisarev	A Just Russia	1,272	4.97%
Total		25,610	100%

==== District 13 ====
Summary of the 18–20 September 2026 Legislative Assembly of Vologda Oblast election in Vologodsky (rural) constituency No.13
Candidate	Party	Votes	%
Galina Trufanova	United Russia	7,374	30.57%
Svetlana Zhiganova	Communist Party	5,358	22.21%
Leonid Grimov	Liberal Democratic Party	3,424	14.19%
Dmitry Chigonin	New People	2,598	10.77%
Sergey Zuyev	Party of Pensioners	2,556	10.60%
Sergey Filin	A Just Russia	1,976	8.19%
Total		24,122	100%

==== District 14 ====
Summary of the 18–20 September 2026 Legislative Assembly of Vologda Oblast election in Gryazovetsky constituency No.14
Candidate	Party	Votes	%
Aleksey Maslov	United Russia	12,102	42.30%
Yevgenia Kopnicheva	Communist Party	6,063	21.19%
Vasily Sobolev	Liberal Democratic Party	2,740	9.58%
Aleksandr Bolotov	Party of Pensioners	2,587	9.04%
Kirill Polyakov	New People	2,342	8.19%
Artyom Bobylev	A Just Russia	1,940	6.78%
Total		28,611	100%

==== District 15 ====
Summary of the 18–20 September 2026 Legislative Assembly of Vologda Oblast election in Vytegorsky constituency No.15
Candidate	Party	Votes	%
Aleksey Golik	Communist Party	7,071	30.98%
Aleksandr Melnikov	United Russia	7,056	30.92%
Andrey Dyakov	A Just Russia	2,538	11.12%
Yelizaveta Uglova	New People	2,025	8.87%
Dimitry Ozhigin	Liberal Democratic Party	2,008	8.80%
Sergey Parshov	Party of Pensioners	1,542	6.76%
Total		22,822	100%

==== District 16 ====
Summary of the 18–20 September 2026 Legislative Assembly of Vologda Oblast election in Nikolsky constituency No.16
Candidate	Party	Votes	%
Mikhail Gromov	United Russia	10,792	39.79%
Valery Shilov	Communist Party	6,910	25.48%
Andrey Belozerov	Liberal Democratic Party	4,423	16.31%
Yelena Grinko	New People	2,536	9.35%
Ilya Yeregin	A Just Russia	1,590	5.86%
Total		27,122	100%

==== District 17 ====
Summary of the 18–20 September 2026 Legislative Assembly of Vologda Oblast election in Cherepovetsky (rural) constituency No.17
Candidate	Party	Votes	%
Mikhail Ananyin (incumbent)	United Russia	8,125	30.56%
Aleksey Koshcheyev	Communist Party	6,726	25.30%
Alyona Popova	New People	3,821	14.37%
Andrey Kovalov	Party of Pensioners	2,697	10.15%
Aleksandr Borisenko	Communists of Russia	2,167	8.15%
Sergey Panichev	Liberal Democratic Party	2,090	7.86%
Total		26,583	100%

=== Members ===
Incumbent deputies are highlighted with bold, elected members who declined to take a seat are marked with ~~strikethrough~~.

Constituency
No.	Member	Party
1	Yury Sapozhnikov	United Russia
2	Yelena Kudryavtseva	United Russia
3	Mikhail Tikhomirov	United Russia
4	Roman Zavarin	United Russia
5	Anton Kholodov	United Russia
6	Aleksandr Morozov	Communist Party
7	Aleksandr Klimenkov	Communist Party
8	Vladimir Vasilevsky	Communist Party
9	Nikolay Varnavsky	Communist Party
10	Natalya Dolgina	United Russia
11	Anatoly Dianov	United Russia
12	Aleksandr Kosyonkov	United Russia
13	Galina Trufanova	United Russia
14	Aleksey Maslov	United Russia
15	Aleksey Golik	Communist Party
16	Mikhail Gromov	United Russia
17	Mikhail Ananyin	United Russia

Party lists
Member	Party
~~Marina Fedotova~~	United Russia
Oleg Molodtsov	United Russia
Valentina Artamonova	United Russia
~~Yury Parfenov~~	United Russia
~~Sergey Lashkov~~	United Russia
~~Valentin Korepin~~	United Russia
~~Anna Aleksandrova~~	United Russia
~~Yevgeny Balandin~~	United Russia
~~Natalya Belova~~	United Russia
~~Vladimir Belyayev~~	United Russia
~~Sergey Belyayev~~	United Russia
~~Yevgeny Bogomazov~~	United Russia
~~Ivan Bykov~~	United Russia
~~Anna Bystrova~~	United Russia
~~Ilya Vikhrov~~	United Russia
~~Maksim Vydrov~~	United Russia
~~Igor Glazov~~	United Russia
~~Natalya Golovchak~~	United Russia
~~Aleksandr Goshkarenko~~	United Russia
~~Denis Dvornikov~~	United Russia
~~Valentina Derdyay~~	United Russia
~~Yelena Yegorova~~	United Russia
~~Sergey Zhestyannikov~~	United Russia
~~Olga Zaporzhina~~	United Russia
~~Irina Zubova~~	United Russia
~~Aleksey Ivanov~~	United Russia
~~Dmitry Kalyukov~~	United Russia
~~Irina Kozulina~~	United Russia
~~Irina Kokosova~~	United Russia
~~Nadezhda Koroleva~~	United Russia
~~Irina Kruglova~~	United Russia
~~Viktor Kuznetsov~~	United Russia
~~Anna Kuskova~~	United Russia
~~Gennady Malyshev~~	United Russia
~~Sergey Nikolayev~~	United Russia
~~Sergey Ordin~~	United Russia
~~Yury Pavlov~~	United Russia
~~Irina Pautova~~	United Russia
~~Svetlana Petrova~~	United Russia
~~Oleg Peshkov~~	United Russia
~~Anton Plenkin~~	United Russia
~~Nikolay Popov~~	United Russia
~~Sergey Popov~~	United Russia
~~Valentina Popova~~	United Russia
~~Viktoria Popova~~	United Russia
~~Albert Sarkisov~~	United Russia
~~Irina Sokolova~~	United Russia
~~Mikhail Surikov~~	United Russia
~~Nadezhda Tikhomirova~~	United Russia
~~Marina Turkina~~	United Russia
~~Yevgeny Tyutyukov~~	United Russia
~~Yury Usikov~~	United Russia
~~Artyom Fedorchuk~~	United Russia
~~Lyubov Tsareva~~	United Russia
~~Larisa Cheboksarova~~	United Russia
~~Leonid Chernyayev~~	United Russia
~~Oleg Shpikin~~	United Russia
~~Yelena Shumilova~~	United Russia
~~Yevgeny Shushkov~~	United Russia
~~Anna Yagnenkova~~	United Russia
Roman Maslov	United Russia
Aleksandr Maslennikov	United Russia
Andrey Makarov	United Russia
Sergey Sorokin	United Russia
~~Tatyana Zynova~~	Communist Party
Igor Yarovoy	Communist Party
~~Yegor Smirnov~~	Communist Party
Stepan Racheyev	Communist Party
Aleksey Koscheyev	Communist Party
~~Ivan Zemlyakov~~	Communist Party
~~Yelena Samsonenko~~	Communist Party
~~Aleksandr Steblinsky~~	Communist Party
~~Vladislav Steblinsky~~	Communist Party
~~Aleksandr Shalushin~~	Communist Party
Artyom Nikonov	Communist Party
Vladimir Cherepanov	Communist Party
~~Irina Mozalevskaya~~	Liberal Democratic Party
Vladimir Selyakov	Liberal Democratic Party
~~Grigory Boyarsky~~	Liberal Democratic Party
~~Leonid Grimov~~	Liberal Democratic Party
~~Yevgeny Koptyayev~~	Liberal Democratic Party
~~Aleksandr Mikhaylov~~	Liberal Democratic Party
~~Nikita Naumov~~	Liberal Democratic Party
~~Aleksandra Osipova~~	Liberal Democratic Party
~~Sergey Smirnov~~	Liberal Democratic Party
~~Ilya Timarbayev~~	Liberal Democratic Party
~~Aleksandr Fadeyev~~	Liberal Democratic Party
~~Ivan Fedotov~~	Liberal Democratic Party
~~Yury Yablokov~~	Liberal Democratic Party
Anton Grimov	Liberal Democratic Party
Aleksandr Borisov	New People
~~Sofya Osekina~~	New People
~~Aleksey Turkin~~	New People
~~Vlada Lebedeva~~	New People
~~Ulyana Voloshenyuk~~	New People
~~Pavel Kopylov~~	New People
~~Yelena Yershova~~	New People
~~Igor Osekin~~	New People
~~Aleksey Galichev~~	New People
~~Irina Ushakova~~	New People
~~Andrey Stepanov~~	New People
~~Irina Shiblova~~	New People
Denis Dolzhenko	New People
Vladislav Zvorykin	A Just Russia
Aleksandr Bolotov	Party of Pensioners

== See also ==
- 2026 Russian regional elections
