= Irina Medvedeva (scientist) =

Russian medical scientist (1958–2021)

- Born: Irina Vasilevna Medvedeva; 10 August 1958
- Died: 12 March 2021 (aged 62)
- Occupation: Medical scientist

Irina Vasilevna Medvedeva (10 August 1958 – 12 March 2021) was a Russian medical scientist, rector of Tyumen State Medical University, Doctor of Medical Sciences, Academician of the Russian Academy of Sciences, Professor, and Honored Scientist of the Russian Federation.
