= Lyudmila Kotesova =

Russian politician (born 1947)

- Людмила Котесова
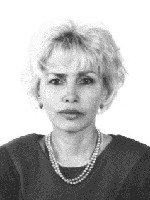

Member of the Federation Council from Chukotka AO
- In office 11 January 1994 – 23 January 1996
- Preceded by: Office established
- Succeeded by: Aleksandr Nazarov (executive authority); Sergey Povodyr (legislative authority)

Personal details
- Born: 22 October 1947 (age 78) Totma, Totemsky District, Vologda Oblast, Russian SFSR, Soviet Union
- Party: Independent
- Other political affiliations: Choice of Russia (1993); Union of Right Forces (1999); Eurasian Party (2003)
- Education: All-Union Legal Correspondence Institute of Law

Lyudmila Stepanovna Kotesova (Russian: Людмила Степановна Котесова; born 22 October 1947) is a Russian politician and jurist. She served as Member of the Federation Council from Chukotka Autonomous Okrug in 1994–1996.

== Biography ==
Lyudmila Kotesova was born on 22 October 1947 in Totma, Vologda Oblast. She graduated All-Union Legal Correspondence Institute of Law in legal and later received a doctorate in jurisprudence.

She started her legal career in Adygea, working as a legal counsel. In 1989 Koteseva moved to Chukotka, where she became an executive secretary of the "Conscience" (Sovest') political group. After Chukotka Okrug Executive Committee was reorganised into Okrug Administration in 1991 newly appointed Head of Administration Aleksandr Nazarov selected Kotesova as Chief of the Okrug Justice Department. Kotesova also was member of the International Bar Association.

In 1993 Lyudmila Kotesova joined pro-Yeltsin Choice of Russia to run for State Duma, leading regional group, however, she withdrew from the party list and ran for Federation Council, instead. In the Chukotka two-member constituency Kotesova placed second with 25.09% of the vote after former people's deputy Maya Ettyryntyna (Independent, 27.29%) and, thus, was elected to the Federation Council.

In the Federation Council Kotesova was appointed Secretary of the Committee on Foreign Affairs and Member of the Commission on Rules and Parliamentary Procedures and the Counting Commission. Despite being elected on pro-government Choice of Russia party line, she joined "Constructive Cooperation" deputies' group, which united nearly all radical opposition and several centrists members, including fellow Chukotka Senator Ettyryntyna.

After direct elections to the Federation Council were abolished and dual mandate principle of formation was adopted, many Federation Council members, including Kotesova, would have been out of the body since January 1996. Lyudmila Kotesova ran for State Duma in her native Vologda Oblast as an independent. She placed only 9th among 14 candidates in the Vologda constituency, winning 4.83% of the vote.

After leaving Federation Council Kotesova resumed her legal practice in Vologda, where she founded "Lyudmila Kotesova and Partners" law firm. She also became a member of the liberal-leaning movement "Jurists for Rights and Decent Life". Prior to the 1999 Russian legislative election the movement joined Union of Right Forces bloc, and Kotesova again ran in the Vologda constituency as SPS candidate. She placed 3rd in the constituency with 9.93%.

In 2003 Kotesova founded "Professional" Lawyers Bar in Moscow, which she also chairs until this day. Around this time Kotesova joined small Eurasian Party — Union of Patriots of Russia, which was founded by State Secretary of the Union of Russia and Belarus Pavel Borodin. The party became a founding member of the Great Russia – Eurasian Union electoral bloc to participate in the 2003 election. Kotesova initially ran in the Vologda constituency, but on 29 October she withdrew from the constituency and only ran in the party list, where she held No.4 position in North-Western regional group. Great Russia bloc won only 0.3% of the vote and failed to win any seats by proportional representation.

In November 2022 Lyudmila Kotesova was a delegate at the Congress of People's Deputies (2022), a conference of Pro-Ukraine former Russian elected officials, led by Gennady Gudkov and Ilya Ponomarev and held in Jabłonna, Poland. At the Congress Kotesova was also elected one of 11 member of the executive committee, alongside former State Duma members Gudkov, Ponomarev, Mark Feygin, Aleksandr Osovtsov, former Senior Policy Advisor to President Putin Andrey Illarionov, jurist Yelena Lukyanova, former municipal deputy Pyotr Tsarkov, activists Andrey Sidelnikov and Yelena Istomina, collaborationist Freedom of Russia Legion's combatant "Caesar". Kotesova was also the only former Federation Council member, who took part in the conference. At the 27–28 June 2023 Congress Kotesova was not reelected to the executive committee.

== Personal life ==
Lyudmila Kotesova is married and has four children.
