= Valentina Artamonova =

Russian politician (born 1960)

- Валентина Артамонова
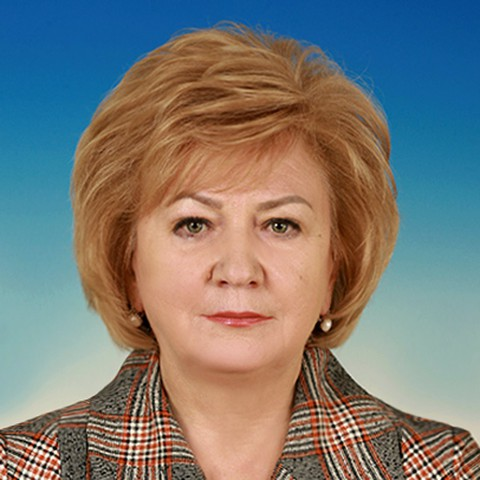

Member of the State Duma for Vologda Oblast
- Incumbent
- Assumed office 12 October 2021
- Constituency: Vologda (No. 85)

Personal details
- Born: 13 December 1960 (age 65) Nesterovo, Sokolsky District, Vologda Oblast, Russian SFSR, USSR
- Party: United Russia
- Education: Saint Petersburg State University of Economics; Northwestern Management Institute

Valentina Nikolayevna Artamonova (Russian: Валентина Николаевна Артамонова; born 13 December 1960, Nesterovo, Sokolsky District, Vologda Oblast) is a Russian politician and deputy of the 8th State Duma.

== Early life and education ==
Artamonova was born on 13 December 1960 in Nesterovo, Sokolsky District, Vologda Oblast. In 1984, she graduated from the Leningrad Institute of Finance and Economics (now Saint Petersburg State University of Economics).

== Career ==
Artamonova has worked in financial management for more than 40 years. Over the course of her career, she has held various positions in the administration of Vologda Oblast.

From 2012 to 2013, she served as Deputy Governor of Vologda Oblast.

== Political career ==
On 19 September 2021, she was elected deputy of the 8th State Duma, representing the Vologda Oblast constituency as a member of United Russia.

== Awards ==
- Order “For Merit to the Fatherland” (2018).

== Sanctions ==
She was sanctioned by the UK government in 2022 in relation to the Russo-Ukrainian War.
