= Irina Sheremetyeva =

Russian psychiatrist

Irina Igorevna Sheremetyeva
- Ирина Игоревна Шереметьева
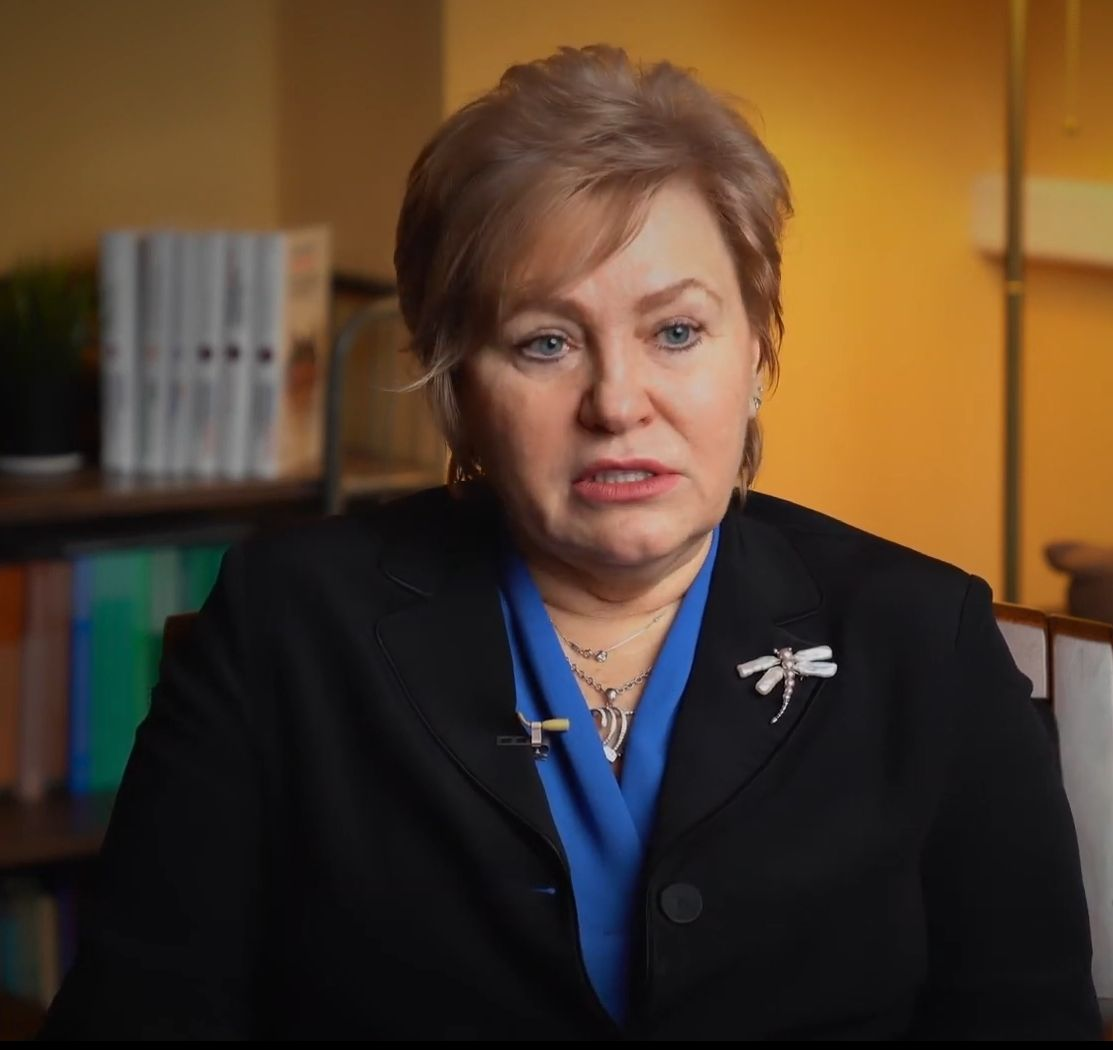
- Sheremetyeva in 2022
- Born: 25 October 1965 (age 60)
- Citizenship: Russia
- Scientific career
- Fields: psychology, psychiatry, neurology, narcology
- Institutions: Altai State Medical University

Irina Igorevna Sheremetyeva (Russian: Ири́на И́горевна Шереме́тьева; born 25 October 1965) is a Russian psychiatrist of the highest category, neurologist, narcologist and rector of the Altai State Medical University (ASMU) since 2003. Doctor of Medical Sciences (2008), professor (2013), Honored Worker of Higher Education of the Russian Federation (2025). One of the most active members of the editorial Expert Council of the info-analytical journal "Accreditation in Education" (Аккредитация в образовании).

== Early life and education ==
She was born on 25 October 1965.

In 1991, she graduated from the Altai State Medical Institute (ASMU) with a degree in General Medicine. In 1992, she completed an internship in Internal Medicine. Since 1995, she has completed a residency in Psychiatry. In 2011, she completed a master's degree in Management at the Altai State University (specializing in Public Administration and Local Self-Government).

Her total experience in medical practice is 25 years, including 16 years as a teacher. Her total career length is 28 years.

== Career ==
- From 1992 to 1995, she worked as a psychotherapist in the day hospital of the Altai Regional Psychoneurological Dispensary (ARPD).
- From 1992 to 2003, she worked in practical healthcare in the Altai Krai (psychotherapist at the Altai Regional Psychoneurological Dispensary and deputy chief physician for treatment work at the dispensary).
- Since 1997, she has held various positions at the Altai Regional Clinical Psychiatric Hospital.
- Since 2001, she has been deputy chief physician for treatment work at the ARPD.
- Since 2003, she has been working full-time at the Altai State Medical University.
- In 2003, she transferred to a full-time teaching position at her alma mater, where she rose through the ranks from associate professor to dean of the medical faculty at ASMU and director of the Institute of Pre-University Education.
- From 2004 to 2009, she was an associate professor in the department of narcology and psychiatry;
- From 2009 to 2015, she was a professor in the department of psychiatry and narcology;
- From 2012 to 2014, she was deputy dean of the pediatric faculty;
- From March to September 2015, she was dean of the medical faculty at ASMU;

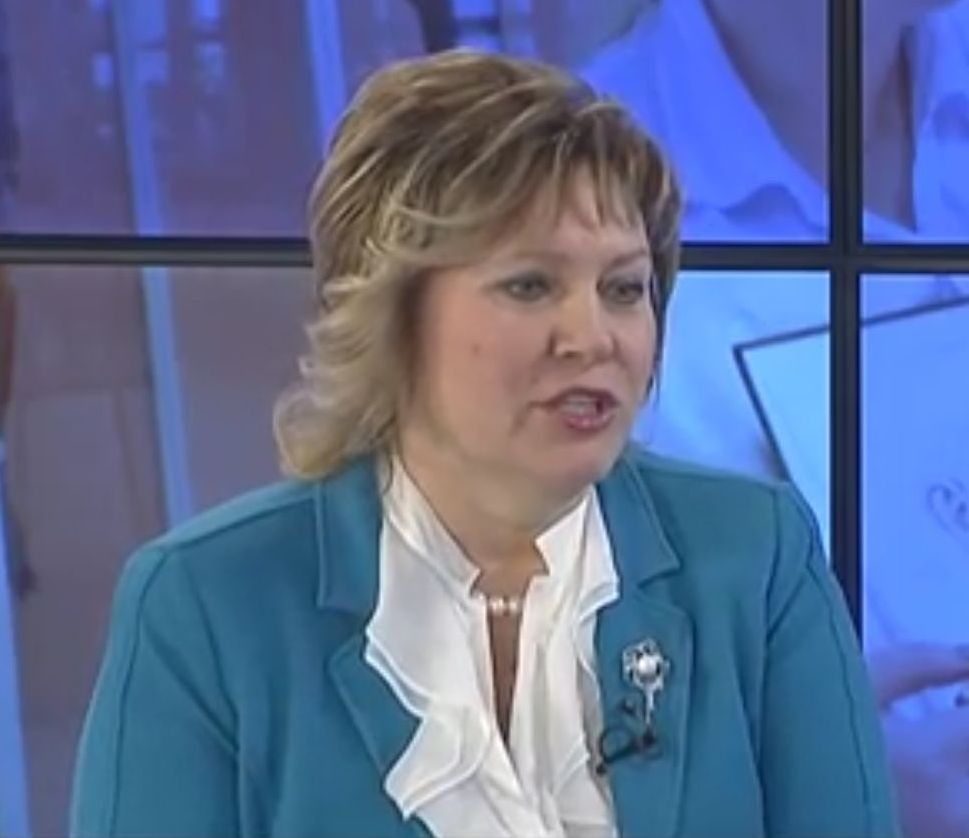
Sheremetyeva in March 2017

- From 2016 to 2018, she was director of the Institute of Pre-University Education;
- From September 2018 to June 2019, she was head of the department of medical psychology, psychiatry, and neurology with a course of continuing professional education;
- In 2019, she received advanced training at the Altai State Medical University in Project Management, Human Resources Management, Current Issues in State and Municipal Administration, and Organizational Management and Economics.
- On November 21, 2019, by Order #279-pk (Russian: № 279-ПК) of the Ministry of Health of the Russian Federation dated November 18, 2019, she was appointed Acting Rector of the Altai State Medical University of the Ministry of Health of the Russian Federation.
- On 20 May 2021, the Acting Rector of Altai State Medical University (ASMU), Irina Sheremetyeva, won the election for head of the university. She was supported by the majority of delegates at the conference of ASMU faculty and students. Three candidates were vying for the position until the very last minute, including Irina Sheremetyeva, who has headed the university for a year and a half as acting rector, and two vice-rectors—for healthcare development and continuing professional education (Dmitry Ganov (Note: Russian: Дмитрий Ганов)) and for academic affairs (Igor Babushkin (Note: Russian: Игорь Бабушкин)). Babushkin withdrew from the election on May 20, shortly before the vote. Ultimately, Irina Sheremetyeva received 96 votes, and Dmitry Ganov received 5. The new head of the university will sign a five-year contract.
- On September 17, 2021, in accordance with Order #170-P.K. (Russian: № 170-ПК) of the Ministry of Health of the Russian Federation dated September 15, 2021, she was confirmed as Rector of the Altai State Medical University of the Ministry of Health of the Russian Federation for a five-year term.
- On March 10, 2025, in accordance with the Decree of March 10, 2025 #126 of the President of Russia Vladimir Putin, she was awarded the title of "Honored Worker of Higher Education of the Russian Federation".

=== Situation ===
The rector of Altai State Medical University Igor Saldan (Note: Russian: Игорь Салдан) resigned on November 20, 2019. His contract with the Ministry of Health expired, and the head of the ministry, Veronika Skvortsova (Note: Russian: Вероника Скворцова), decided not to renew it. Irina Sheremetyeva, who is a professor and former head of the Department of Psychiatry, Medical Psychology, and Neurology with Continuing Professional Education, who was Saldan's main rival in the rectoral election, was appointed acting head of the university. She became the former head of the university after a scandal erupted in the summer of 2019, when her employment contract was not renewed. However, she decided not to sue the university administration and instead focused on the election campaign. Several professors, including Boris Piven' (Note: Russian: Борис Пивень), Vladimir Kulikov (Note: Russian: Владимир Куликов), and other department heads, subsequently left the institute.

=== Scientific activity ===
In 2001, she defended her dissertation for the degree of Candidate of Medical Sciences on the topic of "Mixed Forms of Mental Illness in a Dispensary Patient Contingent (Clinical and Statistical Study)" ("Psychiatry"). In 2008, she defended her dissertation for the degree of Doctor of Medical Sciences on the topic of "Exogenous-Organic Disorders in the General Structure of Mental Illness (Clinical and Epidemiological Study)" ("Psychiatry").

Irina Sheremetyeva is the author of 141 scientific papers, including 19 educational and methodological works, 9 monographs, and 2 patents ("Method for the Treatment of Abdominal Obesity in Metabolic Syndrome Combined with Depressive Disorders"). Topics of his work include: combined trauma and mental pathology, problems of exogenous-organic brain diseases, issues of adaptive disorders (adaptive response disorders), social and psychological adaptation disorders in students, problems of emotional burnout, etc.

Sheremetyeva is one of the most active members of the editorial board of the expert council of the information and analytical journal "Accreditation in Education".

== Membership in editorial boards ==
- "Бюллетень медицинской науки" (Bulletin of Medical Science) is an editor-in-chief and editorial board member;
- "Bulletin of Medical Science" is an editor-in-chief and editorial board member;
- "Scientist (Russia)" is an editor-in-chief;
- "Межкультурные коммуникации в образовании и медицине" (Intercultural Communications in Education and Medicine) is an editor-in-chief;
- "Журнал психиатрии и медицинской психологии" (Journal of Psychiatry and Medical Psychology) is an editorial board member.

== Books ==
This is a list of books by Irina Sheremetyeva (Note: As Шереметьева И.И.) and others psychiatrists (V. M. Bryukhanov, Boris Piven', Dmitriy Ganov, V. N. Verdyashkin, O. S. Talalayeva, and others).

- I. I. Sheremetyeva. PATHOMORPHOSIS OF DELINQUENT BEHAVIOR IN ADOLESCENTS ; –Текст : непосредственный //ИП Иришкин Дмитрий Андреевич /Ведяшкин В.Н., I. I. Sheremetyeva, B. N. Piven', 2015 г., ВЫП. 7 (110), pages 21-25
- Шереметьева И.И. APPROACHES TO ORGANIZING PSYCHIATRIC CARE FOR PATIENTS WITH PULMONARY TUBERCULOSIS IN THE ALTAI KRAI ; –Текст : непосредственный //OOO Уральский центр медицинской и фармацевтической информации /Шереметьева И.И., Плотников А.В., 2015 г., ВЫП. 8 (131), С. 62-67
- Шереметьева И.И. ACTIVATION OF P-450-DEPENDENT MONOOXYGENASES ALTERS THE DIURETIC EFFECT OF HISTOCHROME IN RATS; –Текст : непосредственный //Издательство РАМН /Талалаева О.С., Брюханов В.М., Зверев Я.Ф., Лампатов В.В., Жариков А.Ю., Мищенко Н.П., Шереметьева И.И., 2015 г., ВЫП. 6, С. 723-726
- Шереметьева И.И. ORGANIZING SUICIDAL ASSISTANCE TO ADOLESCENTS IN THE ALTAI REGION ; –Текст : непосредственный //Томский национальный исследовательский медицинский центр РАН /Ведяшкин В.Н., Шереметьева И.И., 2016 г., ВЫП. 3 (92), С. 75-80
- Шереметьева И.И. FEATURES OF THE CLINICAL AND SOCIAL PATHOMORPHOSIS OF SUICIDAL BEHAVIOR IN MODERN ADOLESCENTS ; –Текст : непосредственный //Медицинское маркетинговое агентство "МедиаМедика" /Шереметьева И.И., Ведяшкин В.Н., 2017 г., ВЫП. 6, С. 42-46
- Шереметьева И.И. ORGANIZATION OF MENTAL AND DRUG AID CARE FOR PATIENTS WITH PULMONARY TUBERCULOSIS IN MODERN CONDITIONS ; –Текст : непосредственный //Томский национальный исследовательский медицинский центр РАН /Шереметьева И.И., Плотников А.В., 2017 г., ВЫП. 1 (94), С. 65-68
- Шереметьева И.И. SUICIDAL BEHAVIOR IN MODERN ADOLESCENTS (CLINICAL AND SOCIAL PATHOMORPHOSIS) ; –Текст : непосредственный //Томский национальный исследовательский медицинский центр РАН /Шереметьева И.И., Ведяшкин В.Н., 2018 г., ВЫП. 1 (98), С. 68-74
- Шереметьева И.И. FORMATION AND DEVELOPMENT OF PSYCHIATRY IN ALTAI (ON THE 60TH ANNIVERSARY OF THE DEPARTMENT OF PSYCHIATRY OF ALTAI STATE MEDICAL UNIVERSITY) ; –Текст : непосредственный //Томский национальный исследовательский медицинский центр РАН /Шереметьева И.И., Строганов А.Е., Рыбалко М.И., Нарожнов В.Д., Лещенко Л.В., Курышкин В.И., 2018 г., ВЫП. 3 (100), С. 91-94
- Шереметьева И.И. FEATURES OF THE CLINICAL COURSE, QUALITY OF LIFE AND PSYCHOLOGICAL STATUS IN PATIENTS WHO HAVE SUFFERED MYOCARDIAL INFARCTION WITH ST-SEGMENT ELEVATION IN COMBINATION ; –Текст : непосредственный // -Москва: Издательство "Медицина" /Клестер Е.Б., Балицкая А.С., Шойхет Я.Н., Антропова О.Н., Шереметьева И.И., Николаева М.Г., Клестер К.В., 2019 г., ВЫП. 6, С. 428-434
- Шереметьева И.И. HISTORY OF THE DEVELOPMENT OF PSYCHIATRIC SERVICE IN ALTAI (ON THE 60TH ANNIVERSARY OF THE DEPARTMENT OF PSYCHIATRY OF ALTAI STATE MEDICAL UNIVERSITY) ; –Текст : непосредственный //Издательство Медиа Сфера /Шереметьева И.И., Строганов А.Е., Рыбалко М.И., Лещенко Л.В., Курышкин В.И., 2019 г., ВЫП. 3, С. 70-72
- Шереметьева И.И. REHABILITATION OF PATIENTS WHO HAVE SUFFERED ACUTE POLYMORPHIC PSYCHOTIC DISORDER ; –Текст : непосредственный //Издательство Медиа Сфера /Шереметьева И.И., Строганов А.Е., Кулешова Е.О., 2019 г., ВЫП. 12, С. 84-87
- Шереметьева И.И. THE ROLE OF SPECIAL KNOWLEDGE OF A CLINICAL PSYCHOLOGIST IN CONDUCTING A FORENSIC PSYCHOLOGICAL EXAMINATION IN CIVIL PROCEEDINGS ; –Текст : непосредственный //Министерство здравоохранения Кыргызской Республики /Королев А.А., Шереметьева И.И., Строганов А.Е., 2020 г., ВЫП. 4, С. 101-104
- Шереметьева И.И. EPIDEMIOLOGY OF PROSTATE CANCER IN THE ALTAI KRAI ; –Текст : непосредственный // -Москва: Издательство "Медицина" /Ганов Д.И., Ганова Т.Д., Федоскина А.В., Малышева М.В., Шереметьева И.И., 2020 г., ВЫП. 3, С. 108-112
- Шереметьева И.И. PSYCHOTHERAPEUTIC TARGET SYMPTOMS IN COMBATANTS WITH ORGANIC BRAIN DISEASES COMBINED WITH ADAPTATION DISORDER ; –Текст : непосредственный //Томский национальный исследовательский медицинский центр РАН /Стреминский С.Ю., Шереметьева И.И., Строганов А.Е., Лещенко Л.В., Курышкин В.И., Кулешова Е.О., 2020 г., ВЫП. 2 (107), С. 67-74
- Шереметьева И.И. COMPARATIVE CHARACTERISTICS OF ACADEMIC STRESS AND MENTAL HEALTH OF SENIOR MEDICAL STUDENTS STUDYING IN DIFFERENT UNIVERSITIES (RESULTS OF AN INTERREGIONAL STUDY) ; –Текст : непосредственный //Издательский дом "Панорама" /Руженкова В.В., Шереметьева И.И., Руженков В.А., 2020 г., ВЫП. 5, С. 34-46
