= Roman Maslov =

Russian politician (born 1988)

- Роман Маслов
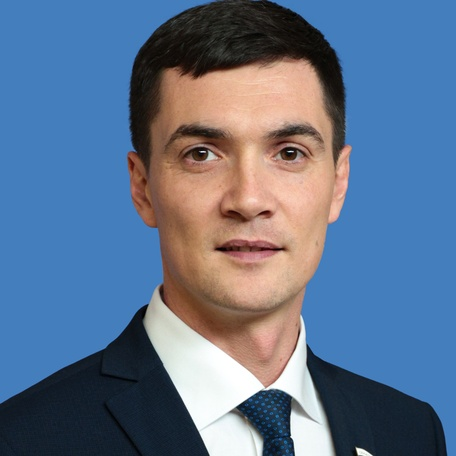

Senator from Vologda Oblast
- Incumbent
- Assumed office 26 February 2026
- Preceded by: Yuri Vorobyov

Personal details
- Born: 29 October 1988 (age 37) Cherepovets, RSFSR, Soviet Union
- Party: United Russia
- Education: Cherepovets State University

Roman Eduardovich Maslov (Russian: Роман Эдуардович Маслов; born October 29, 1988, Cherepovets, Vologda Oblast) is a Russian politician, senator of Federation Council - representative of the Legislative Assembly of the Vologda Oblast since February 26, 2026. Secretary of the Cherepovets local city branch of the United Russia party.

== Biography ==
He was born October 29, 1988, in Cherepovets. He grew up in a family with three children, raised solely by his mother. He has an older sister and a younger brother.

He completed his secondary education at School No. 20 in Cherepovets. From the first grade, he was a class monitor, and from the seventh grade, he headed the student government.

In July 2009, he registered as a sole proprietor.

In December 2011, he became a member of the Youth Parliament of Cherepovets, an advisory and consultative body to the Cherepovets City Duma, created in March 2008 to engage active young people aged 14 to 30 in the implementation of youth policy. In December 2011, the Youth Parliament of the 2nd convocation was formed.

In 2012, he graduated from Cherepovets State University with a degree in management.

In 2013, he served as Deputy Chairman of the Cherepovets Youth Parliament. Ilya Sokolov served as Chairman of the Youth Parliament. In 2014, he served as Chairman of the Standing Committee for the Implementation of Public Projects of the Youth Parliament of the Cherepovets City Duma. In the Cherepovets Youth Parliament, Maslov was the director of the "Dance Plantation" competition and the coordinator of the "Voices of Victory" project. He participated in the "Bright Yard" project, aimed at improving residential areas, playgrounds, and sports grounds. The project was organized by the Cherepovets branch of the United Russia Young Guard, the Cherepovets Youth Parliament, the Public Relations Department of the Cherepovets City Hall, and the Cherepovets Youth Center.

He served as Chairman of the "Pervomaysky" TOS.

In 2015, he completed his master's degree in sociology at the same university.

On May 3, 2017, he participated in the preliminary voting of the Cherepovets city branch of United Russia and was included in the list of 25 finalists for the party to nominate for the Cherepovets City Duma elections. Also in May 2017, he served on the public commission for the United Russia party's "Urban Environment" project in Cherepovets. The commission selected courtyards in Cherepovets that would be renovated with federal funds.

=== Cherepovets City Duma ===
Elections for the 9th convocation of the Cherepovets City Duma (2017–2022) were scheduled in June 2017. Deputies were elected in 26 single-mandate constituencies. 28-year-old Roman Maslov was nominated by the United Russia party as a candidate in single-mandate electoral district No. 24. He was the youngest of the 25 candidates nominated by United Russia. He was registered as the director of the autonomous non-profit organization "Center for the Support of Civil Initiatives 'Opportunity'". Voter turnout in district No. 24 in the September 10, 2017, elections resulted in 16.96% voter turnout. Of the 1,409 votes cast, Roman Maslov received a majority of 785 votes (55.7%), beating out three other candidates. United Russia candidates won in 25 of 26 electoral districts.

On September 14, 2017, at the first meeting of the Cherepovets City Duma of the 9th convocation, Roman Maslov was elected Deputy Chairman of the Cherepovets City Duma and Deputy Mayor of Cherepovets. Meanwhile, deputies elected Margarita Guseva (District No. 4, United Russia) to the position of Chairperson of the Cherepovets City Duma and Mayor of Cherepovets.

Elections to the 10th convocation of the Legislative Assembly of Vologda Oblast were scheduled for June 2021. Deputies were elected under a mixed electoral system: 17 deputies were nominated by party lists with a 5% threshold, and 17 deputies were elected in single-mandate constituencies. Roman Maslov was nominated on the United Russia list, where he was number 3 in the regional group for Northwestern Single-Mandate Electoral District No. 7, behind incumbent Legislative Assembly deputy and Director of the Cherepovets Chemical Engineering College Elena Bykova and deputy director for Social Policy at JSC Apatit, a PhosAgro company, Dmitry Kalyukov. Following the September 19, 2021 elections, he did not receive a mandate.

=== Cherepovets District Administration ===
In early April 2022, deputies of the Cherepovets District Municipal Assembly approved Roman Maslov, First Deputy Head of Administration, as acting head of the municipal administration. On April 29, 2022, Maslov took office as head of the Cherepovets District Administration, thanking Oleg Kuvshinnikov, Governor of Vologda Oblast and Cherepovets District Head Nadezhda Malkova for their support. He replaced Alexander Sergushev in this position.

=== Cherepovets Administration ===
Deputy Mayor of Cherepovets On February 21, 2025, Vologda Oblast Governor Georgy Filimonov announced that Cherepovets Mayor Vadim Germanov had voluntarily resigned, citing the decision as part of the ongoing centralization of the region's governance system. On February 24, Acting Mayor of Cherepovets Artyom Dmitriev appointed five new deputies, including Roman Maslov. At the same time, deputies of the Cherepovets City Duma scheduled a competition for the mayoral position for March 19.

=== Mayor of Cherepovets ===
On March 25, 2025, deputies of the Cherepovets City Duma elected Maslov as Mayor of Cherepovets. He received 19 of the 26 votes cast in his favor. He was confirmed in office at the suggestion of the Governor of Vologda Oblast Georgy Filimonov. He was involved in developing an action plan to prepare for the 250th anniversary of Cherepovets in 2027.

=== Head of Cherepovets ===
On November 25, 2025, deputies of the Cherepovets City Duma elected Maslov as head of Cherepovets. The position of mayor of Cherepovets had previously been abolished at the initiative of Governor Georgy Filimonov, who stated that his administration was getting rid of Anglicisms and changing the Western name to a Russian one.

On February 18, 2026, he announced his resignation as head of Cherepovets. He also announced that he was transferring to the Legislative Assembly of the Vologda Oblast.

=== Federation Council ===
On February 25, 2026, by decision of the Vologda Oblast Electoral Commission, Maslov received the vacant mandate of a deputy of the 10th convocation of the Vologda Oblast Legislative Assembly from the United Russia party, vacated following the early resignation of Alexander Mazuev (regional group for Kharovsky single-mandate electoral district No. 16, number 3). On February 26, immediately after transferring his mandate, Maslov was elected as a senator, representing the Legislative Assembly of Vologda Oblast in the Federation Council, at the suggestion of the United Russia faction.

On April 23, 2026, he was elected chairman of the Board of the Vologda Regional Public Organization "Vologda Fellowship" in Moscow.
