= Altai State Medical University =

Public university in Barnaul, Altai Krai, Russia

Coordinates: 53.356°N 83.762°E

- Алтайский государственный медицинский университет
- Other names: ASMU, АГМУ
- Type: State
- Established: 1954
- Rector: Igor P. Saldan
- Students: 4,000
- Location: Barnaul, Russia
- Website: http://www.agmu.ru Building details
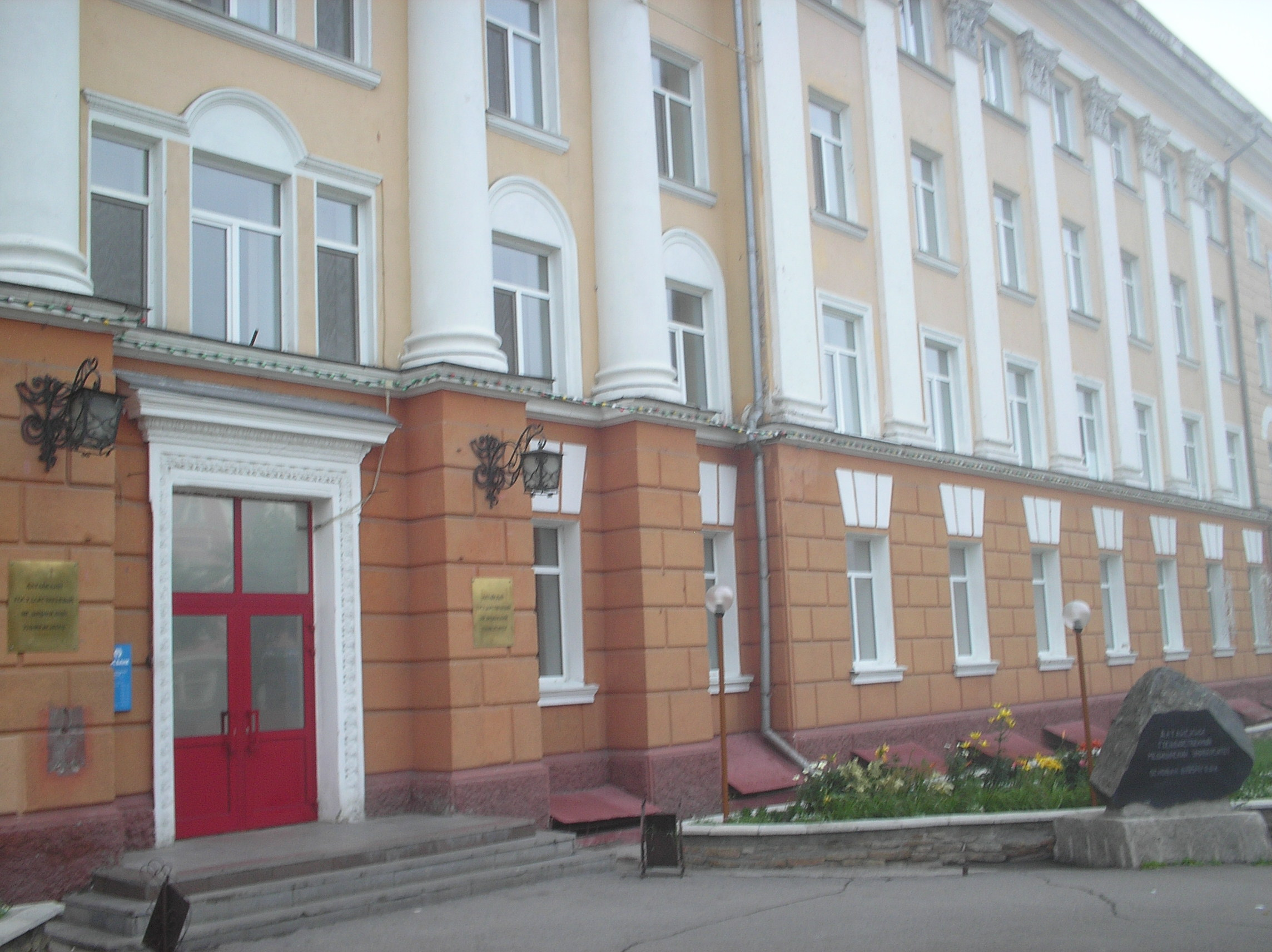

Altai State Medical University (Russian: Алтайский государственный медицинский университет) is a public university in Barnaul, Russia. The university was known as Altai State Medical Institute until 1994. Altai State Medical University is located in the West Siberian part of the country. It is functioned by more than 60 departments and has seven faculties.

Now the rector of ASMU is Irina Sheremetyeva.

== History ==
It was founded by the Council of Ministers of the RSFSR in 1954. ASMU was known as the Altai State Medical Institute until 1996.

== Rankings and reputation ==
Altai State Medical University is ranked number 5,122 in the uniRank world university ranking

== Recognition of Altai State Medical University ==
- The Ministry of Education and Science of the Russian Federation
- Educational Commission for Foreign Medical Graduates (ECFMG)

== Faculties ==
The university has seven faculties:

- General medicine (Лечебный)
- Pediatrics (Педиатрический)
- Pharmaceutics (Фармацевтический)
- Stomatology (Стоматологический)
- Hygiene and disease prevention (Медико-профилактический)
- Nursing (Высшего сестринского образования)
- Further vocational education (Повышения квалификации)

== Rectors ==
- 1954-1957 — Associate Professor Rakhtanov Pyotr Petrovich
- 1957-1964 — Associate Professor Kolomiytsev Fyodor Mitrofanovich
- 1964-1979 — Professor Kryukov Vitaly Nikolaevich
- 1979-1988 — Professor Gervaziev Victor Borisovich
- 1988-2014 — Professor Bryukhanov Valery Mikhailovich
- 2014-2019 — Saldan Igor Petrovich
- from 2019 — acting rector Sheremetyeva Irina Igorevna

== See also ==
- List of medical university in Russia

== Sources ==
- Official website
