= Nesterovo, Sokolsky District, Vologda Oblast =

Nesterovo Нестерово
- Village
- Location within Vologda Oblast Location within Russia
- Coordinates: 59°40′N 39°59′E
- Country: Russia
- Region: Vologda Oblast
- District: Sokolsky District
- Time zone: UTC+3:00

Nesterovo (Russian: Нестерово) is a rural locality (a village) and the administrative center of Nesterovskoye Rural Settlement, Sokolsky District, Vologda Oblast, Russia. The population was 236 as of 2002.

== Geography ==
Nesterovo is located 32 km north of Sokol (the district's administrative centre) by road. Mikhalevo is the nearest rural locality.
