= Privolzhsky Research Medical University =

- Приволжский исследовательский медицинский университет
- Privolzhsky Research Medical University logo
- Former names: Gorky Medical Institute named after S. M. Kirov
- Type: Public university
- Established: 1920
- Rector: Koryakin Nikolay
- Location: (Russia) Nizhny Novgorod, Nizhny Novgorod Oblast, Russia; 56.3294°N 44.0095°E
- Campus: Urban
- Website: https://pimunn.ru/
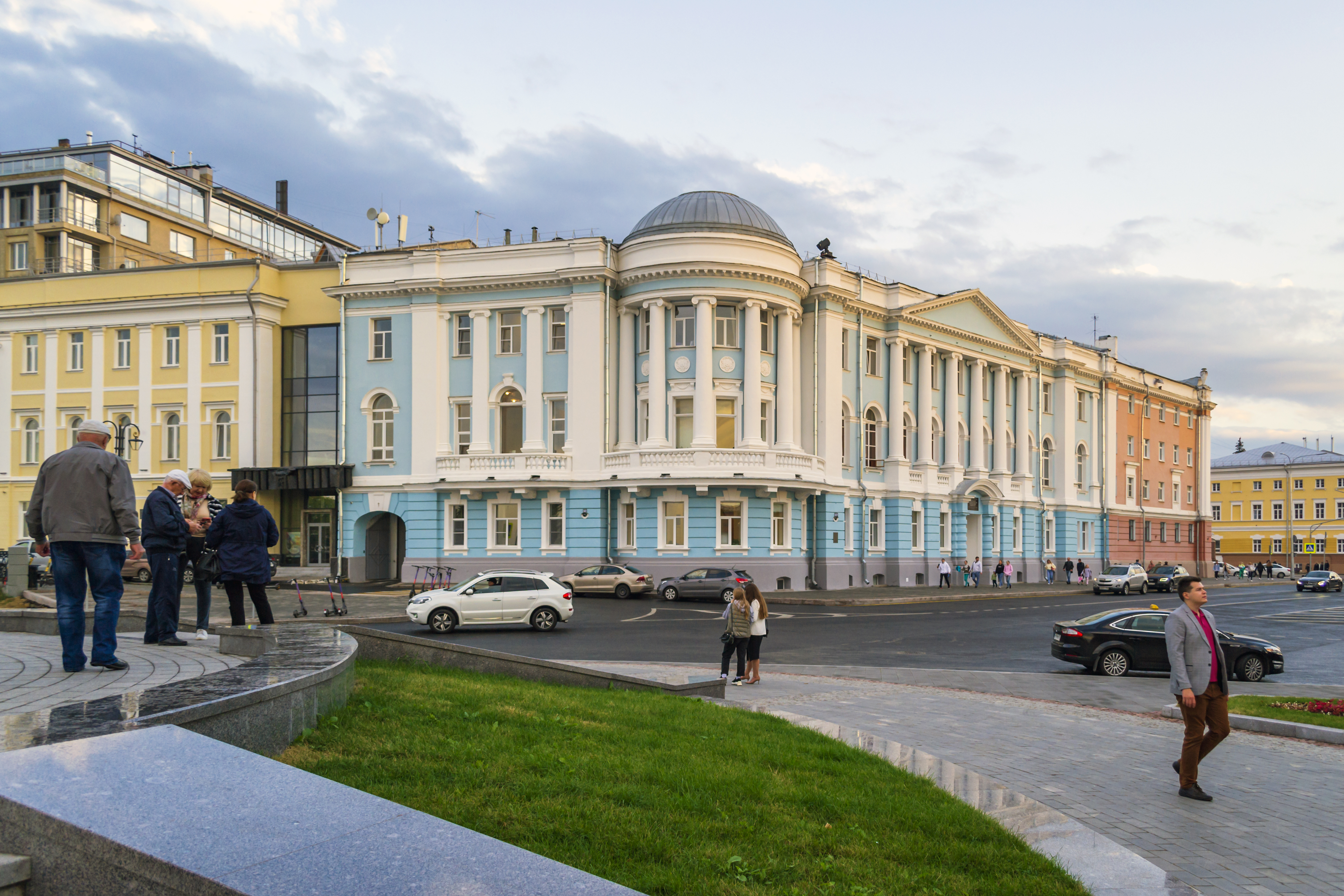

Privolzhsky Research Medical University (Research Medical University of Volga region, Russian: Приволжский исследовательский медицинский университет, old-name: Nizhny Novgorod State Medical Academy, NNSMA) is one of the medical schools in the Russian Federation which is located in the city of Nizhny Novgorod.

== Organisation ==
As of 2014 the rector was Shakhov Boris Yevgenevich (Russian Шахов Борис Евгеньевич), D.Sc. There are 70 specialised departments with over 600 teaching staff. It has approximately 3000 students in 7 faculties which include:

- Faculty of Medicine
- Faculty of Pediatrics
- Faculty of Pharmacy
- Faculty of Medico-prophylaxis (Preventive medicine)
- Faculty of Stomatology (Dentistry)
- Faculty of Higher Nursing Education
- Faculty of Preparatory courses (Pre-medical courses)

== Faculty of Foreign Admissions ==
Some of the foreign students study medicine completely in English medium, and some others study in Russian language. However, students who study in English medium also have to study Russian language to be able to communicate with local Russian people who have very little knowledge of English, and thus being able to communicate with patients for basic clinical training.

== Faculty of Medicine ==
Most students have to undergo one year of preliminary course for one year, before continuing their undergraduate studies. General Medicine program lasts after 6 years. Upon graduation, the graduates are awarded a first professional degree which is the doctor of medicine or M.D. which is an M.B.B.S. equivalent because the graduates have been trained in the field of general surgery.

== Postgraduate Programmes ==
Postgraduate courses are also provided for both Russian and international students. Among the courses are Internal Medicine, Pediatrics, Radiology, General Surgery, Traumatology and Orthopedics, Cardiovascular Surgery, Infectious Diseases, Neurology, Pediatric Surgery, Obstetric and Gynaecology, Epidemiology, Hygiene, Microbiology, Orthodontics etc.

== See also ==
- Education in Russia
