= Volgograd State Medical University =

Russian Medical University

- Волгоградский Государственный Медицинский Университет
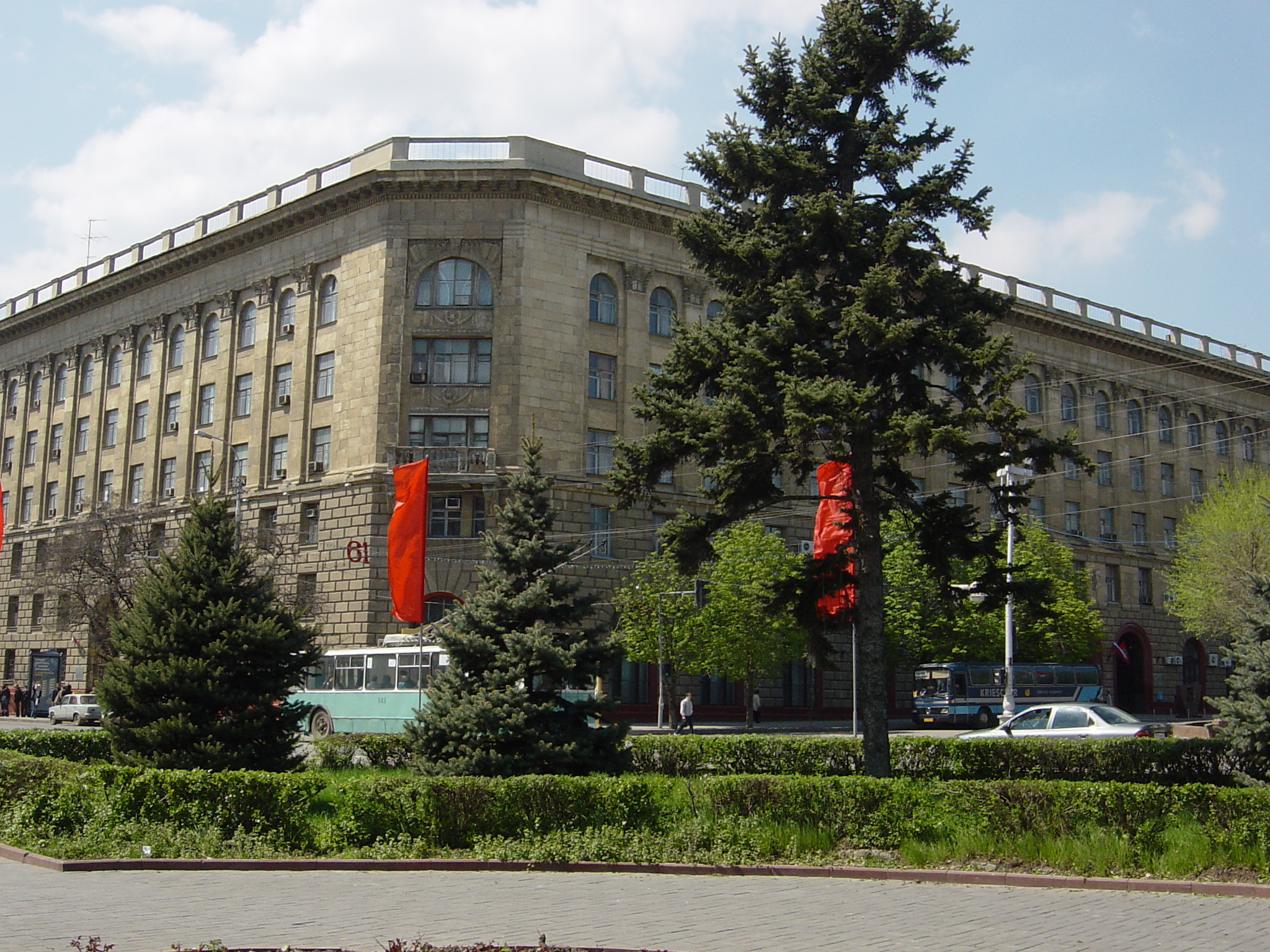
- Former names: Stalingrad Medical Institute; Volgograd Medical Academy
- Motto: Symbolum Sanitatis
- Type: Public
- Established: 1935
- Officer in charge: Rector - Vladimir I. Petrov
- Vice-Chancellor: Aleksandr A. Spasov
- Rector: Vladimir I. Petrov
- Dean: Dmitry N. Yemelianov (For international students)
- Administrative staff: 763 highly qualified professors and instructors
- Students: 5000 citizens of Russia and 900 international students
- Location: Volgograd, Volgograd Oblast, Russia; 48°42′25″N 44°30′54″E
- Campus: Multiple campuses
- Website: http://www.volgmed.ru/

Volgograd State Medical University is located in Volgograd which is situated in the southern part of Russia on the west bank of the Volga River. It started as Stalingrad Medical Institute founded in 1935. In 1993 it received the status of the Academy, and in 2003 it was granted the status of the University. It's ranked 88th of all high schools and 15th of medical schools in Russia.

The University is accredited by the Russian Ministry for Education for the teaching of both Russian and overseas students. Since 2000 the Volgograd State Medical University has got an opportunity to teach foreign students in the English language.

== Colleges and Departments of the university ==
- College of General Medicine
- College of Dentistry and MD
- College of Pediatrics
- College of Pharmacy
- College of Medical Biochemistry
- College of Social Work and Clinical Psychology
- Department for International Students
- College for Postgraduate and Continuous Education
- Department for Foundation Courses

In Pyatigorsk there is the branch of VSMU — the Pyatigorsk Medical and Pharmaceutical Institute.

== Teaching ==
Postgraduate training is provided by different colleges of the University; it is available in the following areas: Allergology and Immunology, Cardiology, Clinical Pharmacology, Endocrinology, Family Medicine, Gastroenterology, Gynecology and Obstetrics, Infectious Diseases, Maxillofacial Surgery, Neurology, Oncology, Surgical Dentistry, Ophthalmology, Orthodontics, Otolaryngology, Pathological Anatomy, Paediatrics, Phthisiology, Preventive Dentistry, Prosthodontics, Psychiatry, Pulmonology, Radiotherapy, Dermatology, ST Diseases, Social Hygiene and Public Health, Sports Medicine and Occupational Medicine, Pedodontics, Surgery of Children, Surgery, Therapy (Internal Medicine), Traumatology and Orthopaedics, Urology. There are 4 varieties of post-diploma training: Internship, Residency, and Postgraduate training for Ph.D. The course of studies at the Internship is for 1 year. After graduation the Specialization Certificate is provided. The course of studies at the Residency is 2 years. After graduation the Specialist Certificate is provided. The course of studies at the Ph.D. is from 3 to 5 years. Following the thesis completion the scientific degree Ph.D. (Medicine) is granted.

== Facilities ==
=== University campus ===
The pre-clinical courses are provided at the 4 main buildings of the university while the clinical courses are provided at 15 multi-profile clinics.

=== Accommodation ===
The University provides 3 hostels with most of the facilities for students.

=== Sports, Social and Cultural facilities ===
The university has a department for physical training.

=== Student welfare ===
The University has a special Department for International students which is in charge of the welfare of the international students, their academics and everyday activities.
