= Pyatigorsk Medical and Pharmaceutical Institute =

- Russian: Пятигорский медико-фармацевтический институт
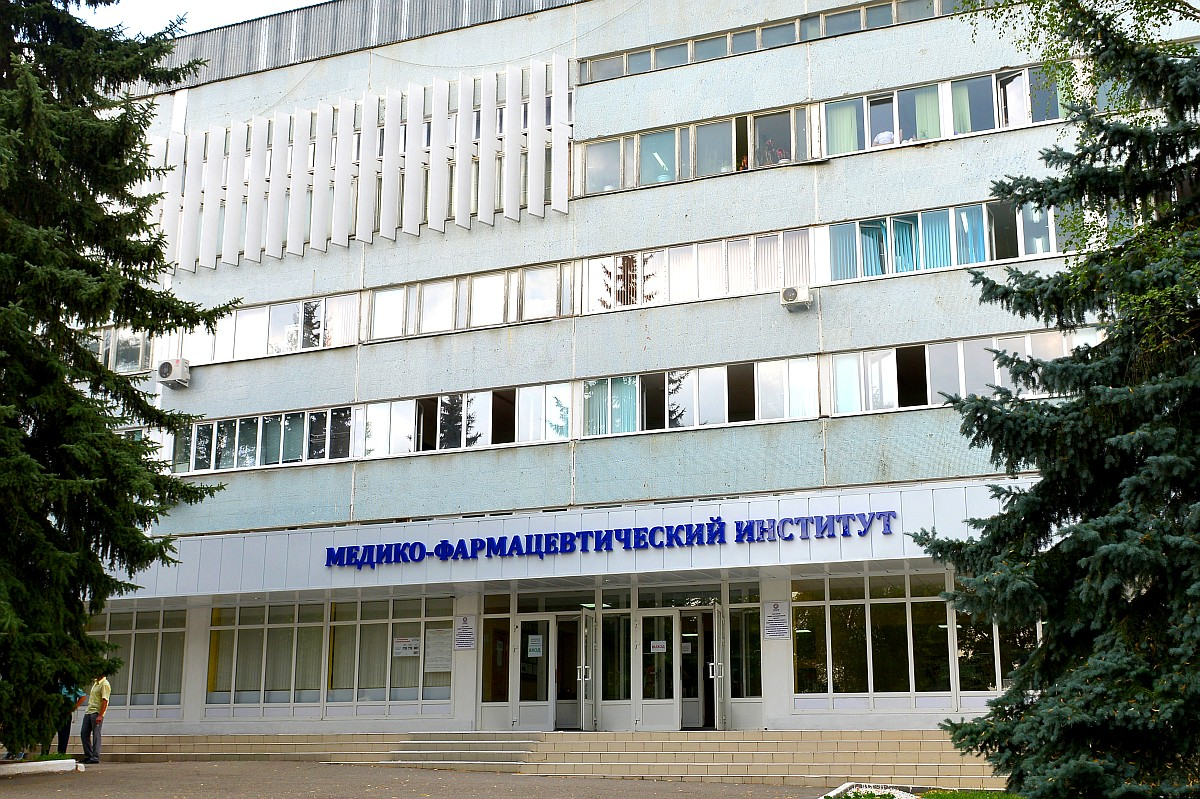
- Former names: Pyatigorsk Pharmaceutical Institute, Pyatigorsk State Pharmaceutical Academy
- Type: public
- Established: 1943
- Parent institution: Volgograd State Medical University
- Acting director: Maksim Chernykh
- Location: 11 Kalinina avenue, Pyatigorsk, Stavropol Krai, Russia; 44°03′12″N 43°03′58″E
- Campus: urban
- Website: www.pmedpharm.ru

The Pyatigorsk Medical and Pharmaceutical Institute (PMPI; Russian: Пятигорский медико-фармацевтический институт, ПМФИ) is a public higher medical school in Pyatigorsk, Russia. It's the branch of the Volgograd State Medical University. The institute is an institution of Russia in medical and pharmaceutical science and included in the register of universities of UNESCO.

== History ==
Due to the outbreak of the Great Patriotic War, in August 1941, the Dnepropetrovsk Pharmaceutical Institute with a big part of its material base was evacuated to Pyatigorsk. At the end of April 1942, the staff was expanded by a group of teachers and students of the Leningrad Pharmaceutical and 2nd Leningrad Medical Institutes. In March 1943, the Pyatigorsk Pharmaceutical Institute was organized on the basis of evacuated Dnepropetrovsk and Leningrad universities.

Since 1952, the systematic development of the material base of the Institute began when its laboratory building was expanded. In 1954, advanced training courses for pharmacy managers were organized here. In 1972, a new PPI academic building was opened.

In 1994, the Institute achieved the status of academy — the Pyatigorsk State Pharmaceutical Academy. In 2012, the academy was renamed again (to the Pyatigorsk Medical and Pharmaceutical Institute) and joined the Volgograd State Medical University as a branch.

== Education and Science ==
The Institute provides training in the following programs: pharmacy, dentistry, medical practice, medical biochemistry, special (defectology) education, management, pre-university training, postgraduate education programs — residency, postgraduate study.

Since 1962, the training of foreign specialists for the countries of Asia, Africa and Latin America has been conducted at the institute. In 2013, the Center for World Languages and Cultures was opened at the institute.
