= Tyumen State Medical University =

Medical university in Russia

- Тюменский государственный медицинский университет
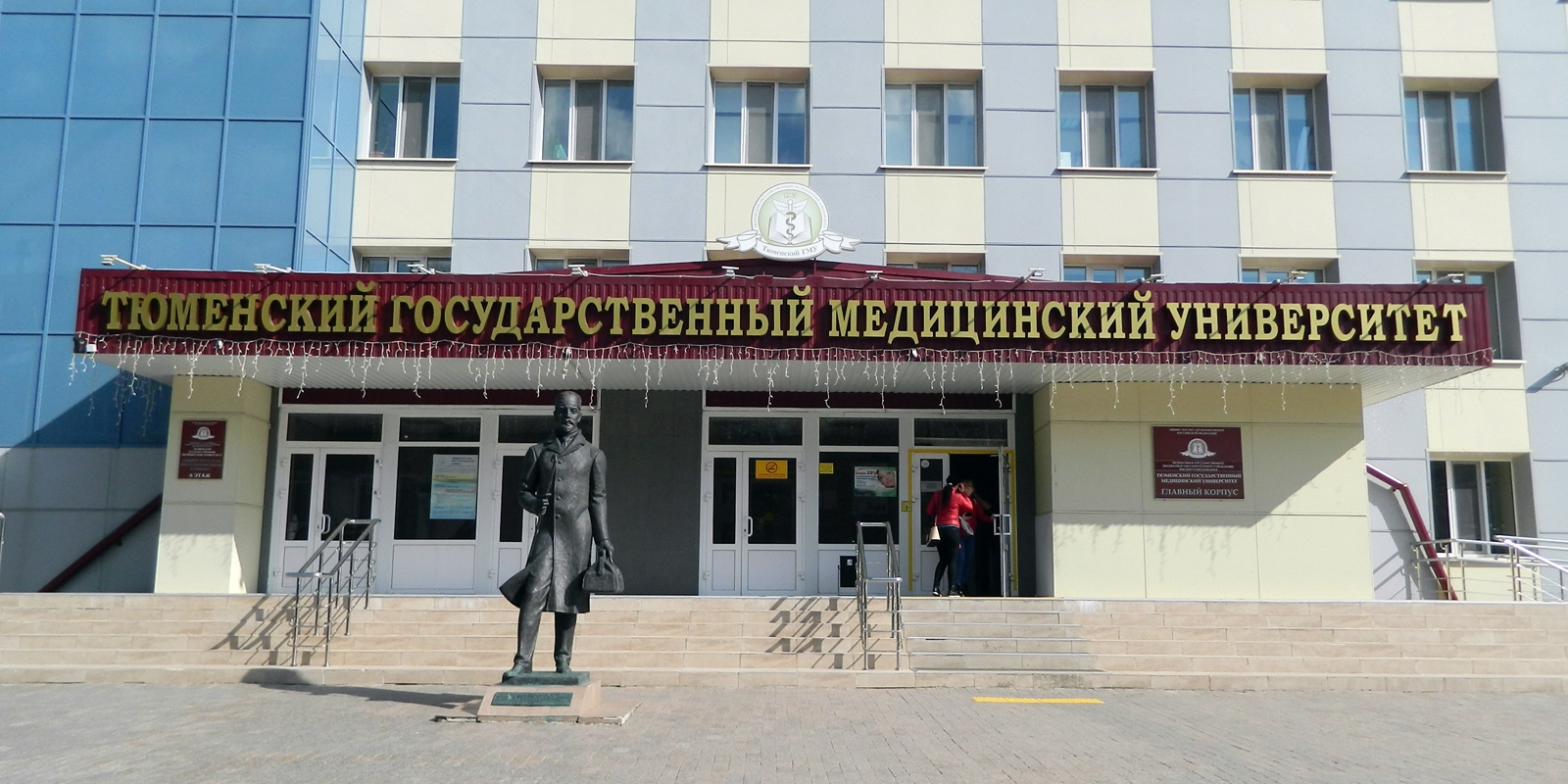
- Former names: Tyumen State Medical Institute (1963-1995), Tyumen State Medical Academy (1995-2015)
- Motto: Consumor aliis inserviendo
- Motto in English: “By shining for others, I burn myself”
- Established: June 8, 1963
- Rector: Ivan Mikhailovich Petrov
- Students: 5,000
- Location: Tyumen, Russia; 57.1376°N 65.5759°E
- Website: www.tyumsmu.ru

Tyumen State Medical University is a state institution of higher professional education and science, located in the city of Tyumen, Russia. Since 1963, it has trained over 25 thousand doctors. Graduates of this university are almost all the chief doctors of medical institutions and health care managers in the Tyumen and Kurgan regions, as well as the Khanty-Mansiysk Autonomous Okrug and Yamal. The third generation of scientists “raised” within its walls is already working at the university. Tyumen State Medical University is the alma mater for 800 candidates of science and two hundred doctors of science, now working not only in their native region, but also in other universities in the country and in practical healthcare.

== History ==
The university was founded in 1963 as the Tyumen State Medical Institute. It not only served as a base for training doctors to support the development of the Tyumen oil fields but also became a scientific center. At the Tyumen Medical Institute, with the support of Glavtyumengeologiya, a laboratory for biomedical problems and labor physiology was established. Its staff conducted more than 20 expeditions to oil and gas-bearing regions to study the issues of health protection for people living and working in extreme conditions.

By 1974, the university had more than 900 students in medical and pharmaceutical specialties, 279 teachers worked in 44 departments, including 14 doctors of science, there was a postgraduate school, there was its own sports camp, and a boarding school for indigenous peoples. The students completed their internship in the institute's clinics located in medical institutions in Tyumen.

In 1983, the young scientist E. A. Kashuba initiated the creation of the first immunological laboratory in Tyumen at the institute.

In 1995, the university was renamed Tyumen State Medical Academy.

In 2002, as a decision by the governor of the Tyumen region Sergey Sobyanin, a dental faculty with a modern specialized clinic was opened at the university.

Since 2010, the academy has introduced a quality management system for the interstate standard GOST ISO 9001-2011.

Since October 2012, on the initiative of Rector E.A. Kashuba, the university has been a participant in the international educational project TEMPUS, funded by the European Union, on the topic "Human Safety: Environmental Protection, Food Quality, Public Health in Areas Contaminated by Radioactive Substances."

Cooperation agreements connect the university with such international partners as the University of Strasbourg, Astana Medical University, South Kazakhstan Pharmaceutical Academy, and the University of Debrecen. This allows the school to annually send the best students to summer clinical schools, congresses, and international student exchange programs. For the university's 50th anniversary in 2013, a monument to a zemstvo doctor was installed in front of its main entrance. The mayor of Tyumen, Alexander Viktorovich Moor, facilitated the renovation of the infrastructure of the academic buildings.

On March 11, 2015, the Tyumen State Medical Academy was transformed into a university.

== Overview ==
Higher professional education is implemented in 4 specialties (General Medicine, Pediatrics, Pharmacy, Dentistry) and one area of training (a Nursing bachelor's degree). Every year, about 3,500 students study at the university, full-time and part-time, in higher education programs. According to programs of additional professional education, about 6 thousand people are trained in 56 medical specialties during the academic year in cycles of advanced training and professional retraining. Internship training is carried out in 29 specialties, while residency training is carried out in 35 specialties.

At the university, the teaching staff is distributed among 60 departments, of which 50% are clinical departments. Among the teachers of Tyumen State Medical University there are about 130 doctors of science and 300 candidates of science, and one academician of the Russian Academy of Sciences. Four university employees have the title of Honored Scientist of the Russian Federation, 58 people have the title of Honored Doctor, Honored Health Worker or Honored Worker of Higher Education of the Russian Federation. Five employees were awarded orders and medals of the Russian Federation.

Students are trained in five academic buildings. Clinical training of university students is carried out at 24 medical institutions in the city of Tyumen and the region.
