= Cherepovets State University =

Educational institution in Vologda, Russia

- Череповецкий государственный университет
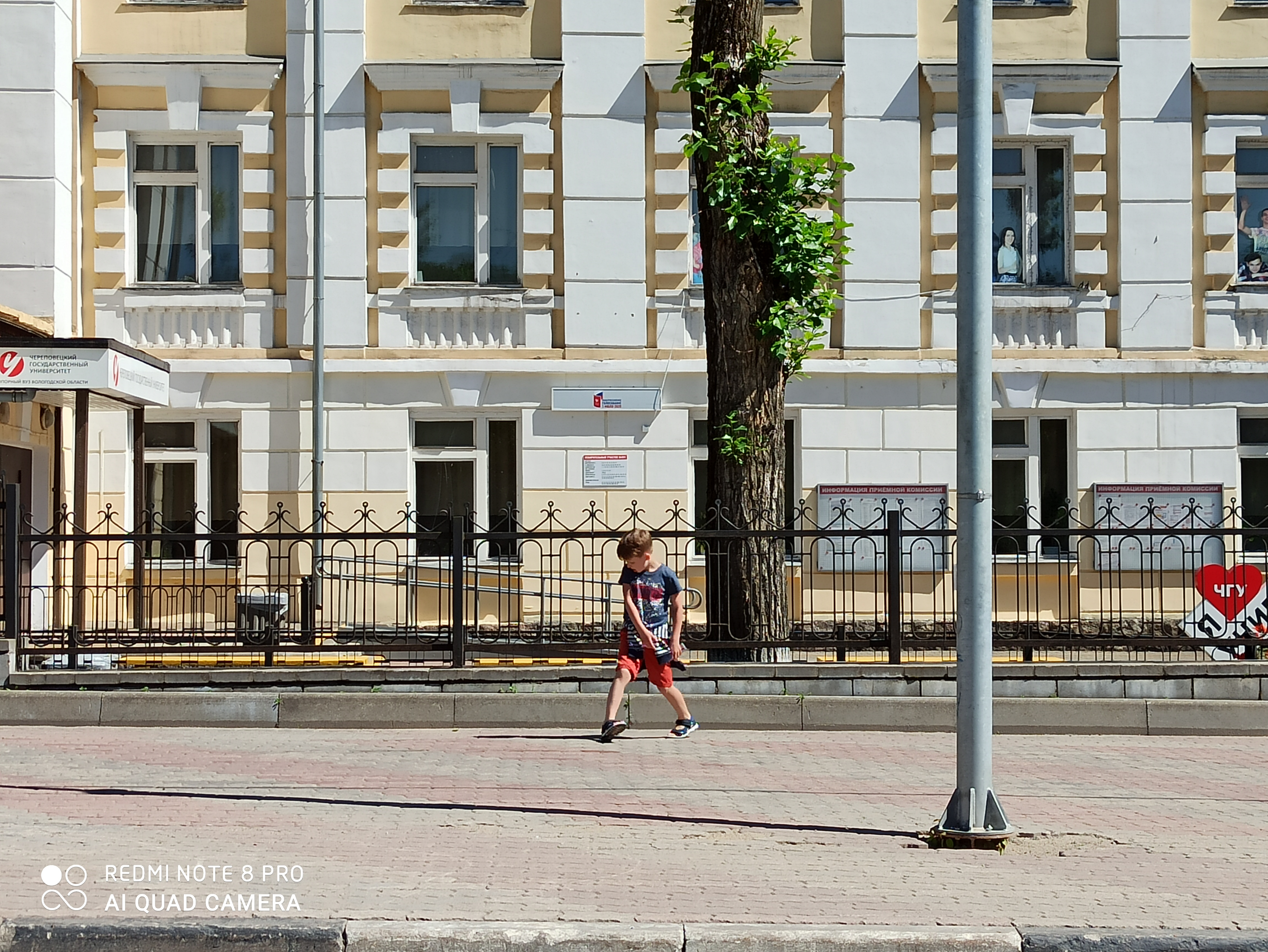
- Type: Public
- Established: 1996
- Location: Cherepovets, Russia; 59°07′12″N 37°55′48″E
- Campus: Urban
- Nickname: ChGU (Russian: ЧГУ)
- Website: www.chsu.ru

Cherepovets State University is an educational institution in the Cherepovets, Vologda Oblast in Russia. It was founded in 1996 as the Cherepovets State Industrial Institute and Pedagogical Institute. It hosts more than 5,000 students.

The university has the following institutes:

- Humanities Institute,
- Institute of Pedagogics and Psychology,
- Institute of Metallurgy and Chemistry,
- Institute of Economics and Engineering,
- Institute of Extra-Mural Education.

Admission into the university is based on performance in the Unified State Exam. The UST measures the student's ability to perform in a university setting. In addition, an applicant submits a written application and a school-leaving certificate.
