= Yaroslavl State Medical Academy =

- Ярославский государственный медицинский университет (ЯГМУ) (Russian)
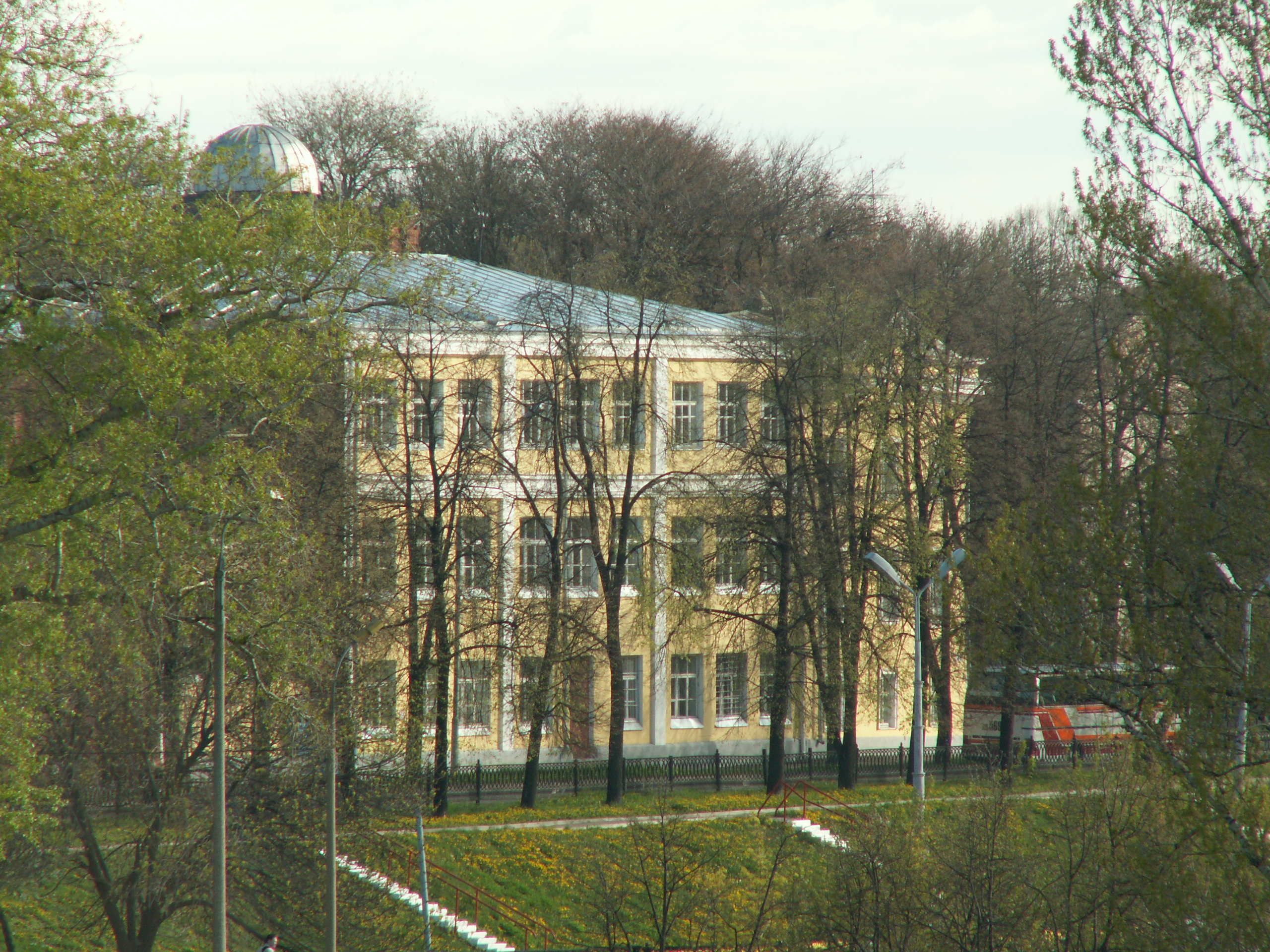
- The Main Building of the Academy was built in 1793 as a school for boys. Poet Nikolay Nekrasov studied there between 1832 and 1837.
- Type: Public research
- Established: 15 August 1944
- Location: Yaroslavl, Russia; 57.6243°N 39.8963°E
- Campus: Urban
- Website: ysmu.ru

Yaroslavl State Medical University (Russian: Федеральное государственное бюджетное образовательное учреждение высшего образования «Ярославский государственный медицинский университет» Министерства здравоохранения Российской Федерации) is a medical university in Yaroslavl, a city in European part of Russia. It was founded in 1944. YSMU is a regional center of medical education and bio-medical research.

== Departments ==
There are educational faculties and divisions in YSMU, these are:

- General Medicine Faculty,
- Pediatric Faculty,
- Pharmacy Faculty,
- Faculty of Post-Graduate education and professional retraining of specialists of the healthcare,
- Division of Advanced Education,
- Pre-Education (preparatory)

== Foreign students ==
Education of foreign students both on budget (governmental) and contract basis was started by YSMU in 1992.

Medical training and education are conducted by 55 departments. The academic staff of YSMU consists of more than 550 persons. Among them, more than 400 have the M.D. and Ph.D. titles (including 310 candidates of sciences, assistant and associated professors and 70 doctors of sciences and full professors).
