= Doctor of Medical Science =

Professional degree for physician assistants

A Doctor of Medical Science (DMS or DMSc) is a professional doctoral degree offered by universities in the United States, in addition to other universities around the world. The degree is often pursued by physician assistants (PAs), however some programs such as the Massachusetts College of Pharmacy and Health Sciences allow for non-PA applicants. Often, non-PA applicants must be licensed healthcare providers holding at least a Master's degree. Holders of the Doctor of Medical Science degree are entitled to the post-nominal letters of DMS or DMSc. One institution, the Massachusetts College of Pharmacy and Health Sciences, in the past issued a Doctor of Science in Physician Assistant Studies, an equivalent degree that uses the postnominals of DScPAS (now a DMSc program). It is also known as a Doctor of Physician Assistant Studies.

Harvard University, through the Harvard School of Dental Medicine, also grants the DMSc for specialist study in geriatric dentistry.
