= Orlovsky (inhabited locality) =

Orlovsky (Russian: Орло́вский; masculine), Orlovskaya (Орло́вская; feminine), or Orlovskoye (Орло́вское; neuter) is the name of several inhabited localities in Russia.

== Modern localities ==
Urban localities

- Orlovsky, Zabaykalsky Krai, an urban-type settlement in Aginsky District of Zabaykalsky Krai

Rural localities

- Orlovsky, Kemerovo Oblast, a settlement in Shabanovskaya Rural Territory of Leninsk-Kuznetsky District of Kemerovo Oblast
- Orlovsky, Nizhny Novgorod Oblast, a settlement in Ostankinsky Selsoviet under the administrative jurisdiction of the town of Bor, Nizhny Novgorod Oblast
- Orlovsky, Chulymsky District, Novosibirsk Oblast, a settlement in Chulymsky District of Novosibirsk Oblast
- Orlovsky, Kolyvansky District, Novosibirsk Oblast, a settlement in Kolyvansky District of Novosibirsk Oblast
- Orlovsky, Rostov Oblast, a settlement in Orlovskoye Rural Settlement of Orlovsky District of Rostov Oblast
- Orlovsky, Ryazan Oblast, a settlement in Orlovsky Rural Okrug of Pronsky District of Ryazan Oblast
- Orlovsky, Seltinsky District, Udmurt Republic, a vyselok in Novomonyinsky Selsoviet of Seltinsky District of the Udmurt Republic
- Orlovsky, Yarsky District, Udmurt Republic, a pochinok in Pudemsky Selsoviet of Yarsky District of the Udmurt Republic
- Orlovsky, Novonikolayevsky District, Volgograd Oblast, a khutor under the administrative jurisdiction of the urban-type settlement of Novonikolayevsky of Novonikolayevsky District of Volgograd Oblast
- Orlovskoye, Novosibirsk Oblast, a selo in Ubinsky District of Novosibirsk Oblast
- Orlovskoye, Saratov Oblast, a selo in Marksovsky District of Saratov Oblast
- Orlovskoye, Udmurt Republic, a selo in Orlovsky Selsoviet of Syumsinsky District of the Udmurt Republic
- Orlovskoye, Yaroslavl Oblast, a village in Mikhaylovsky Rural Okrug of Rybinsky District of Yaroslavl Oblast
- Orlovskaya (rural locality), a village in Dvinitsky Selsoviet of Syamzhensky District of Vologda Oblast

== Abolished localities ==
- Orlovsky, Serafimovichsky District, Volgograd Oblast, a khutor in Kletsko-Pochtovsky Selsoviet of Serafimovichsky District of Volgograd Oblast; abolished before July 2013
