= Tulips peninsula =

Tourist attraction in Rostov Oblast, Russia

Tulips peninsula (Russian: Полуостров тюльпанов) is a tourist attraction which is situated near Orlovsky village, Rostov Oblast, Russia, in the valley of the Manych River. It is most visited in the second half of April during the mass flowering of tulips.

== History ==
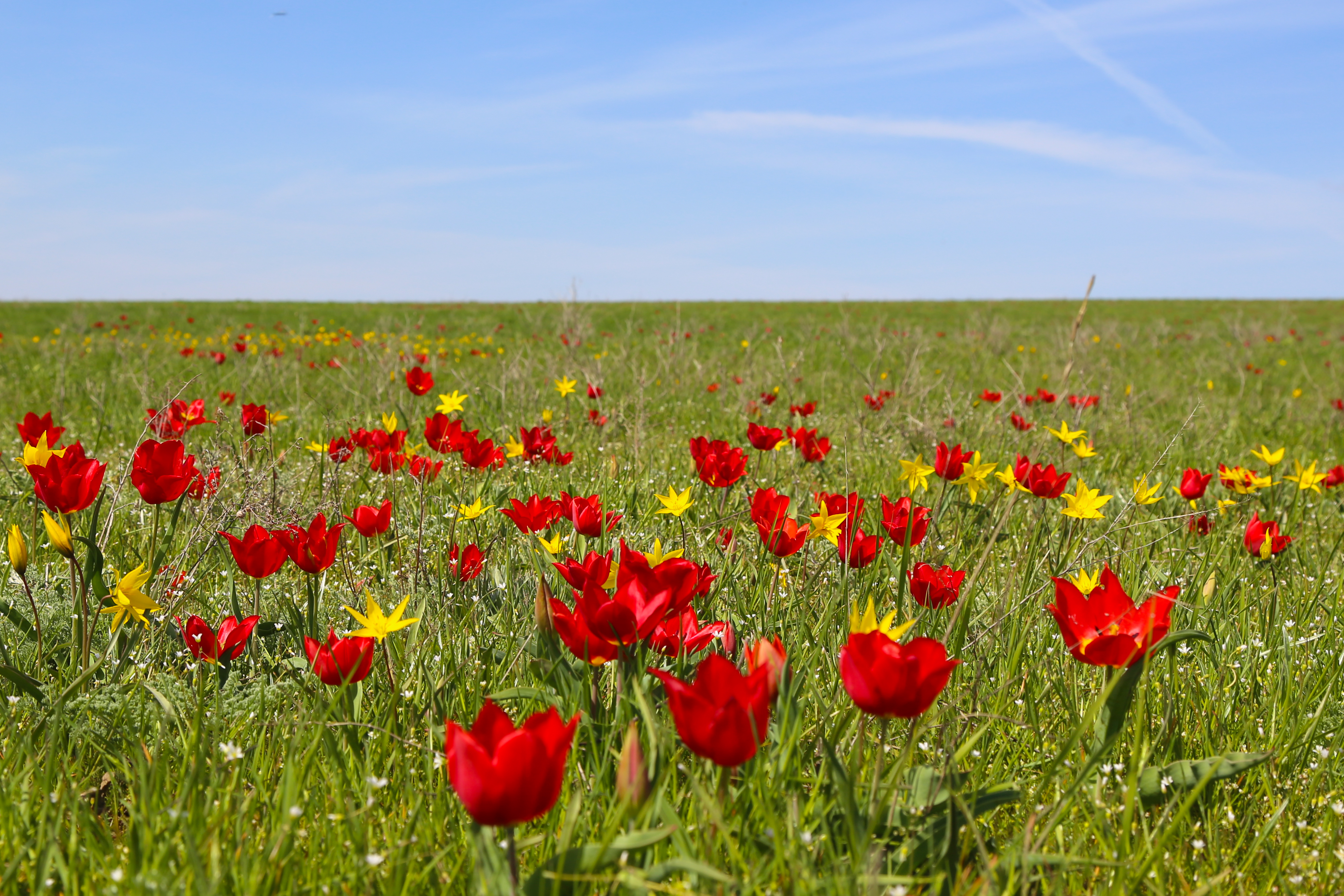
Tulipa gesneriana and tulipa biebersteiniana

Every year, in the second half of April, in the valley of the Manych River, there is always a mass flowering of tulips.

At the territory of the reserve, it is prohibited to arrange places for rest, therefore locals rest on nearby ponds that were arranged there between 1911 and 1960. Tulips grow on sections of the unraveled steppe. Tendencies to reduce number tulips have not yet been observed. Besides tulips, in the valley also grow irises, feather grass, wormwood, sweet clover, onopordum, Limonium.

In Orlovsky District of Rostov Oblast, the festival "Vospetaya Step" is held since in 2012. The event is of interest to those who are interested in the nature of the steppe. In 2015, the festival was visited by about 3,500 people. Tourists have the opportunity to explore the territories with flowering tulips.
