= Orlovsky =

Orlovsky or Orłowski (masculine), Orlovskaya or Orłowska (feminine), or Orlovskoye (neuter) may refer to:

- Orlovsky (surname), a Slavic surname
- Oryol Oblast (Orlovskaya oblast), a federal subject of Russia
- Orlovsky District, several districts in Russia
- Orlovsky Urban Settlement, a municipal formation which the urban-type settlement of Orlovsky and two rural localities in Aginsky District of Agin-Buryat Okrug of Zabaykalsky Krai are incorporated as
- Orlovskoye Urban Settlement, a municipal formation which the Town of Orlov in Orlovsky District of Kirov Oblast is incorporated as
- Orlovsky (inhabited locality) (Orlovskaya, Orlovskoye), several inhabited localities in Russia
- Róg Orłowski, a settlement in Poland
- Wólka Orłowska, Warmian-Masurian Voivodeship, a village in Poland
