= Oryol =

City in Oryol Oblast, Russia

Oryol Орёл
- City
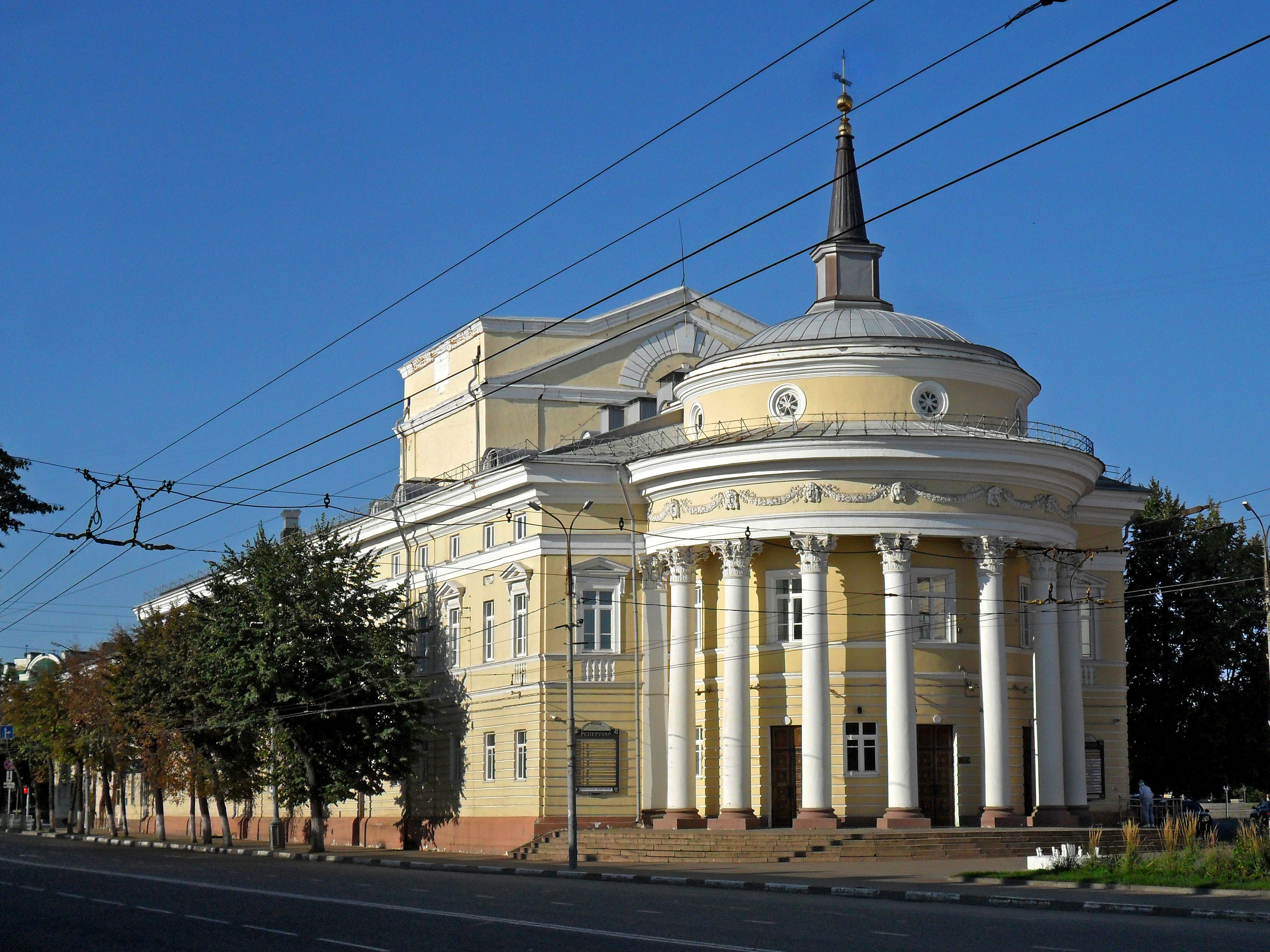
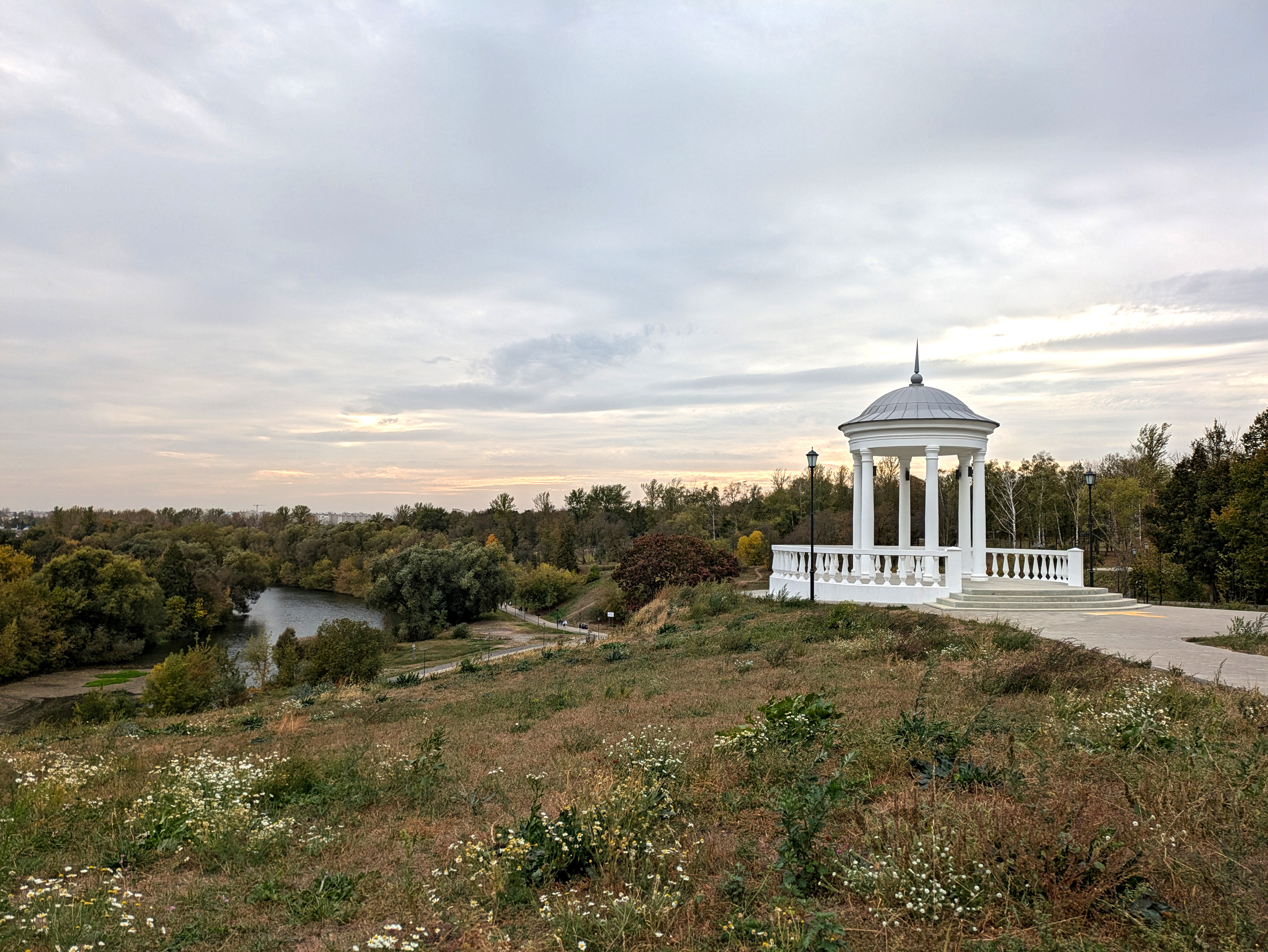
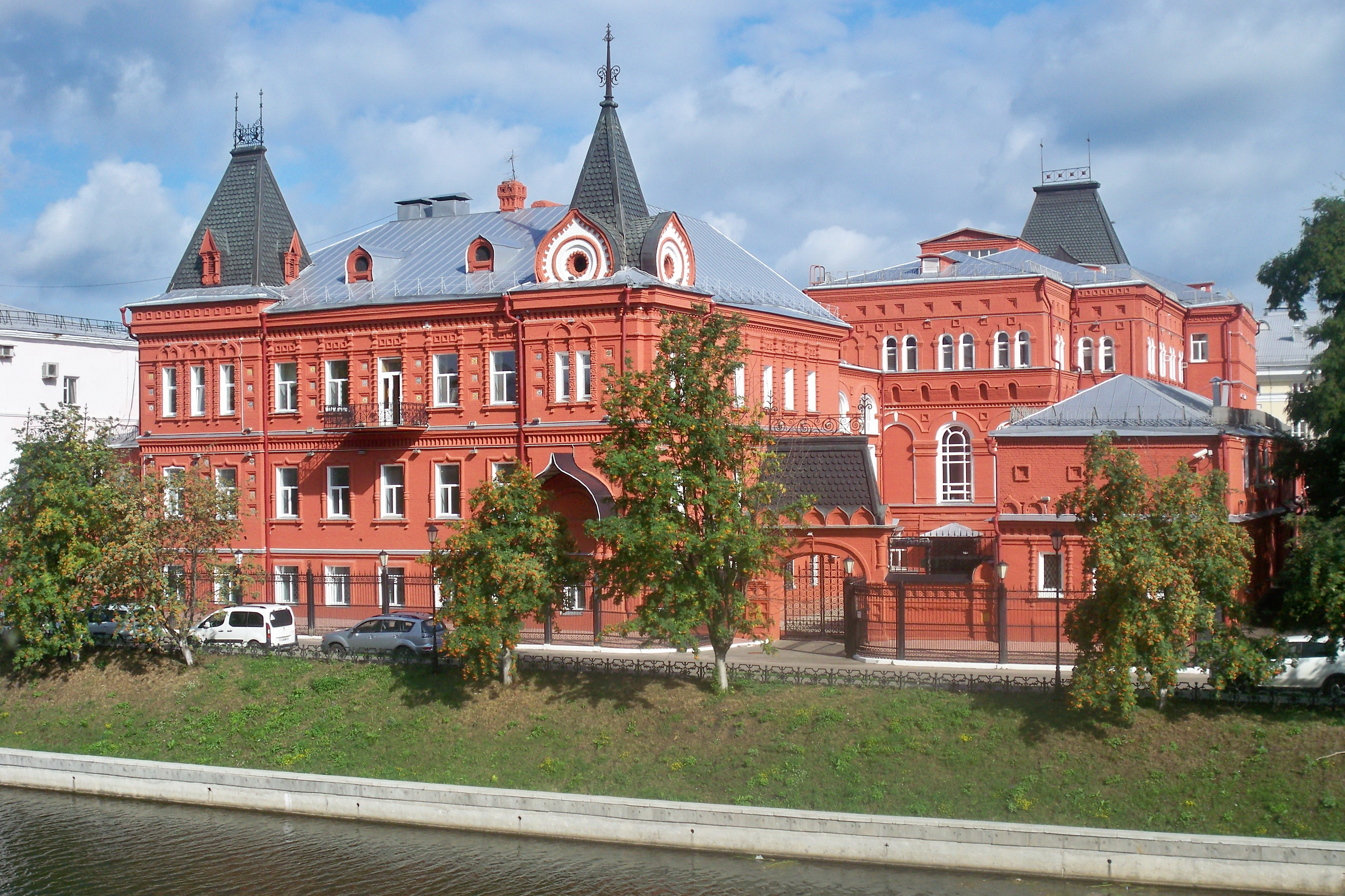
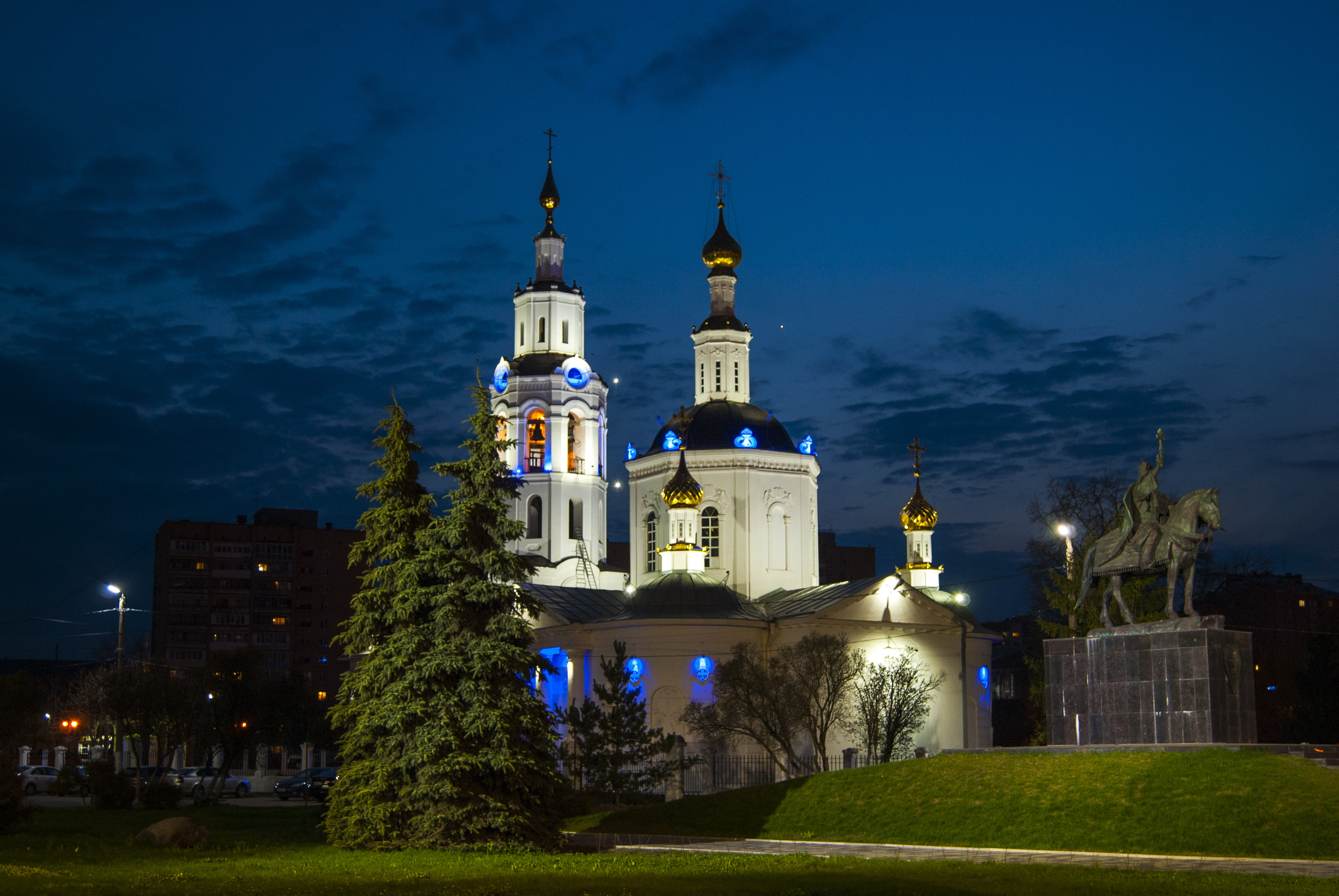
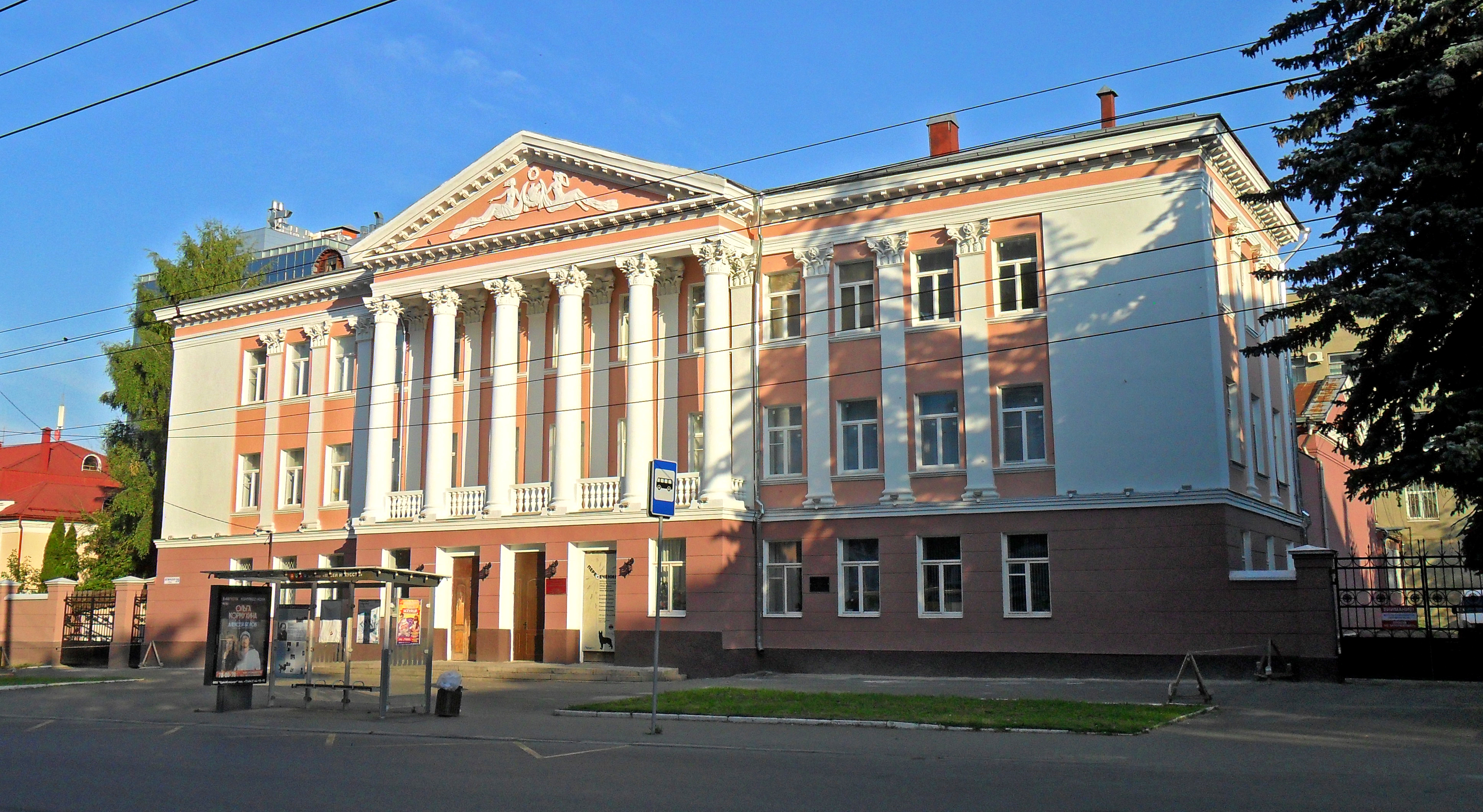
- Magistrate building Noble Nest Park Central Bank Epiphany Church Museum of Fine Arts

- Flag Coat of arms
- Interactive map of Oryol
- Location of Oryol Oryol (Russia) Oryol (European Russia) Oryol (Europe)
- Coordinates: 52°58′07″N 36°04′10″E
- Country: Russia
- Federal subject: Oryol Oblast
- Founded: 1566

Government
  - Mayor: Yuri Parakhin

Area
  - Total: 121.21 km^{2} (46.80 sq mi)
- Elevation: 170 m (560 ft)

Population (2010 Census)
  - Total: 317,747
  - Estimate (2025): 289,503 (−8.9%)
  - Rank: 57th in 2010
  - Density: 2,621.5/km^{2} (6,789.5/sq mi)

Administrative status
  - Subordinated to: city of oblast significance of Oryol
  - Capital of: Oryol Oblast, city of oblast significance of Oryol

Municipal status
  - Urban okrug: Oryol Urban Okrug
  - Capital of: Oryol Urban Okrug, Orlovsky Municipal District
- Time zone: UTC+3 (MSK)
- Postal code: 302000–302999
- Dialing code: +7 4862
- OKTMO ID: 54701000001
- City Day: August 5
- Website: www.orel-adm.ru

Oryol (Russian: Орёл, IPA: [ɐˈrʲɵl], lit. 'eagle'), also transliterated as Orel or Oriol, is a city and the administrative center of Oryol Oblast, Russia, situated on the Oka River, approximately 368 kilometers (229 mi) south-southwest of Moscow. It is part of the Central Federal District, as well as the Central Economic Region.

First founded as a medieval stronghold of the Principality of Chernigov, Oryol was part of Lithuania in the late medieval period, and then Russia since the early modern period. It has served as the seat of regional administration since 1778. The city is particularly known for the infamous former prison for political and war prisoners of Tsarist Russia, the Soviet Union and Nazi Germany.

== History ==
=== Early history ===
While there are no historical records, archaeological evidence shows that a fortress settlement existed between the Oka River and Orlik Rivers as early as the 12th century, when the land was a part of the Principality of Chernigov. The name of the fortress is unknown; it may not have been called Oryol at the time. In the 13th century, the fortress became a part of the Zvenigorod district of the Karachev Principality. In the early 15th century, the territory was conquered by the Grand Duchy of Lithuania. The city was soon abandoned by its population after being sacked either by Lithuanians or the Golden Horde. The territory became a part of the Tsardom of Russia in the 16th century.

=== Tsardom of Russia ===
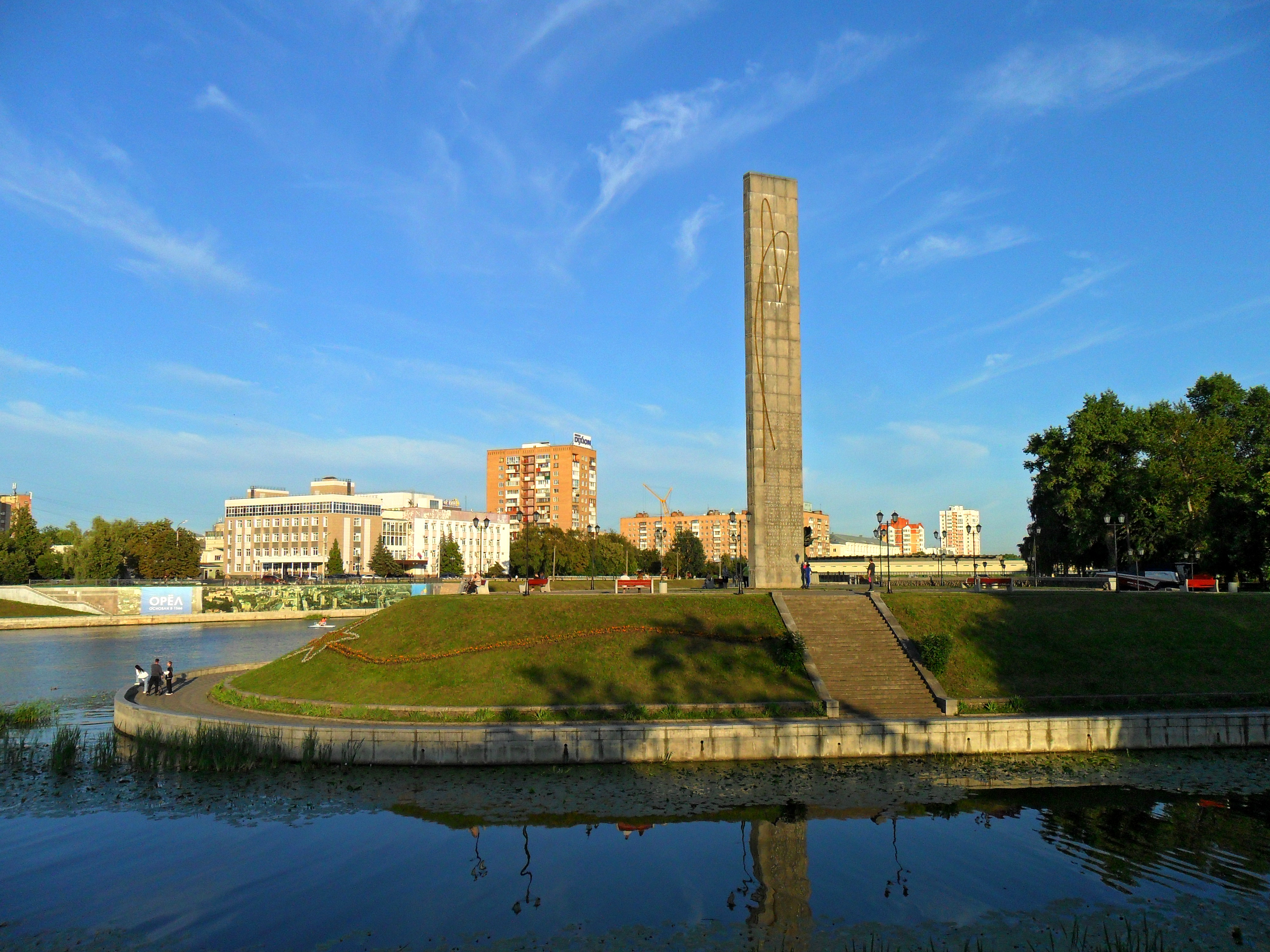
Monument to 400th anniversary of founding

Ivan IV Vasilyevich decreed that a new fortress be built on the spot in 1566 for the purpose of defending the southern borders of the country. The fortress was built starting in the summer of 1566 and ending in the spring of 1567. The location chosen was less than ideal strategically, as the fortress was located on a seasonally flooded low ground easily targeted from the neighboring high ground. False Dmitry I and his army passed through Oryol in 1605; Ivan Bolotnikov in 1606; False Dmitry II camped in Oryol for the winter of 1607–1608. Polish forces sacked it in 1611 and 1615. While the population fled after the second sacking and moved to Mtsensk, the Orlovsky Uyezd continued to exist administratively.

Oryol was rebuilt in 1636. The question of moving the fortress to the more advantageous high ground was debated until the 1670s, but the move was never made. The fortress was deemed unnecessary and taken apart in the early 18th century.

=== Russian Empire ===
In the mid-18th century Oryol became one of the major centers of grain production, with the Oka River being the major trade route until the 1860s when it was replaced by a railroad.

Oryol was granted town status in 1702. In 1708, Oryol was included as a part of Kiev Governorate; in 1719, Oryol Province was created within Kiev Governorate. The Province was transferred to the newly created Belgorod Governorate in 1727. On March 11 (February 28 old style), 1778 Oryol Vice-Royalty was created from parts of Voronezh and Belgorod Governorates. In 1779, the city was almost entirely rebuilt based on a new plan; and the Oryol River was renamed Orlik (lit: "little eagle").

=== Russian Republic ===
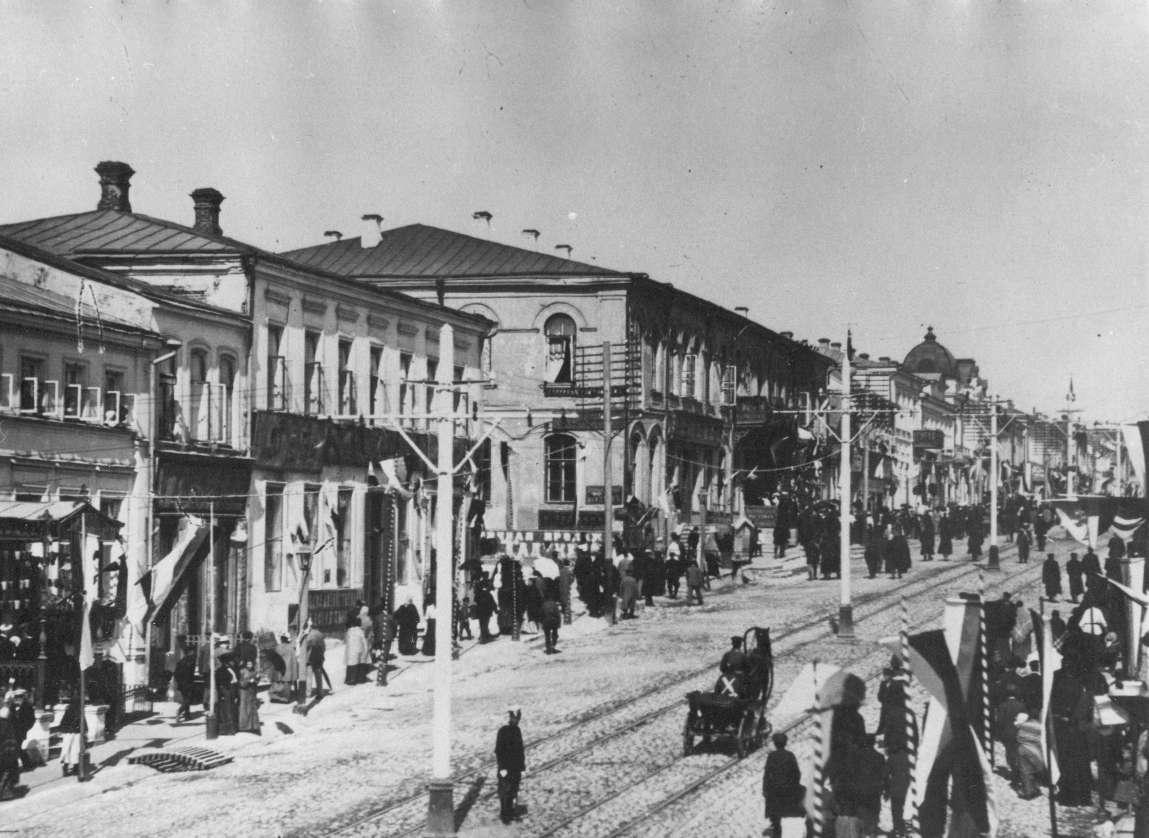
Early-20th-century view

After the October Revolution of 1917, the city was in Bolshevik's hands, except for a brief period between October 13 and October 20, 1919, when it was controlled by Anton Denikin's White Army.

=== Soviet Union ===
Oryol was once again moved between different oblasts in the 1920s and 1930s: first as Oryol Governorate until 1928, then Central Black Earth Region between 1928 and 1934, finally in Kursk Oblast), finally becoming the administrative center of its own Oryol Oblast on September 27, 1937.

The Oryol Prison was a notable place of incarceration for political prisoners and war prisoners of the Second World War. Christian Rakovsky, Varvara Yakovleva, Maria Spiridonova, Olga Kameneva and 153 other prominent political prisoners were shot on September 11, 1941 on Joseph Stalin's orders in the Medvedev Forest massacre outside Oryol.

During World War II, Oryol was occupied by the Wehrmacht on October 7, 1941.

The French air squadron Normandie-Niemen fought in the skies over Oryol.

Oryol was liberated on August 5, 1943 during the Oryol strategic offensive operation "Kutuzov" on the Oryol-Kursk Bulge. The city was almost completely destroyed. By Order No .2 of I. V. Stalin of August 5, 1943, on this day in Moscow, an artillery salute was given to the troops that liberated Oryol. Since then, the city has had the nickname, "City of the First Salute", and the day of the liberation from the German invaders was celebrated as the city's day.

On September 19, 1943, in the Oryol, was the first parade of partisan units stationed in the Oryol region during the war.

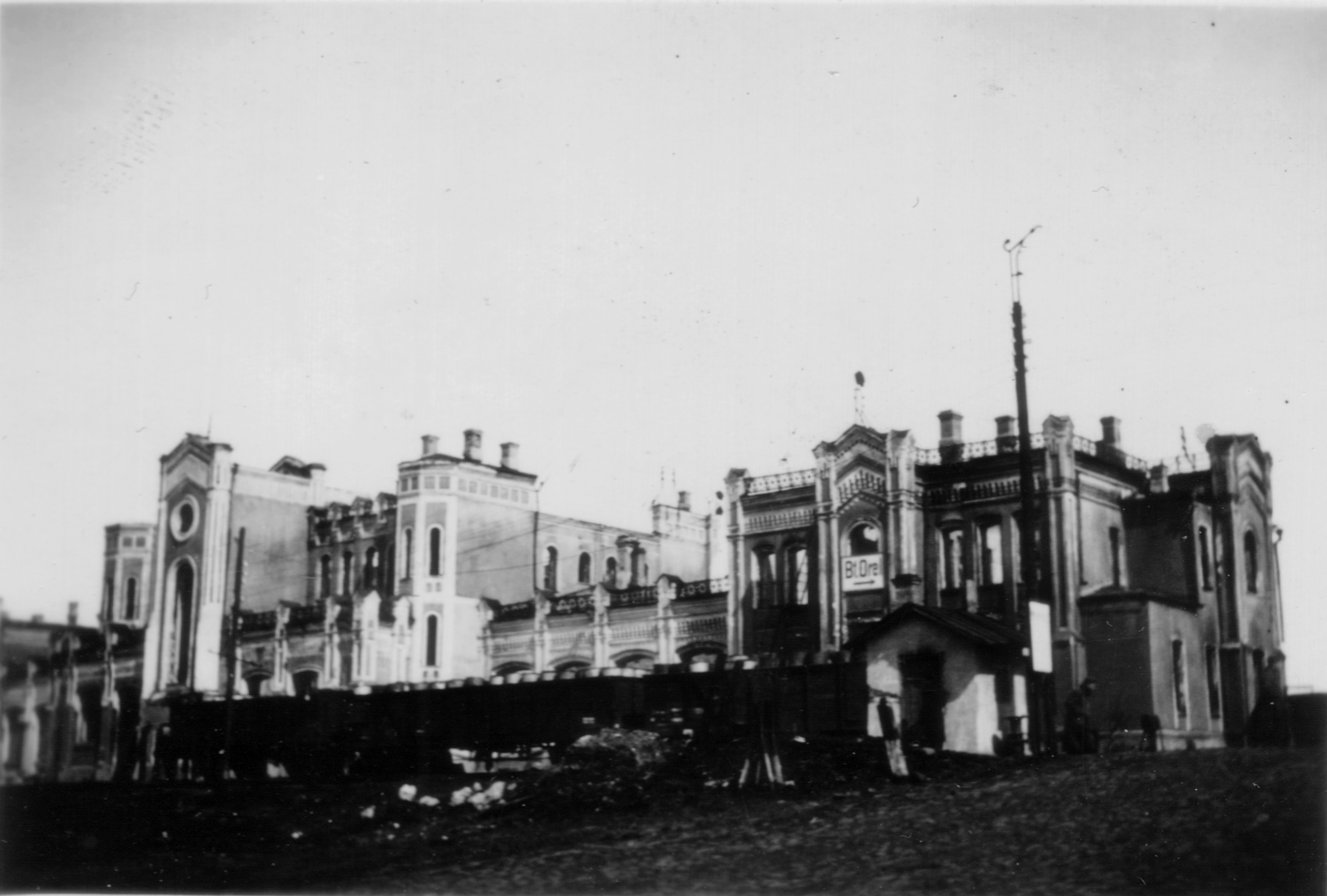
Oryol railway station in September 1941

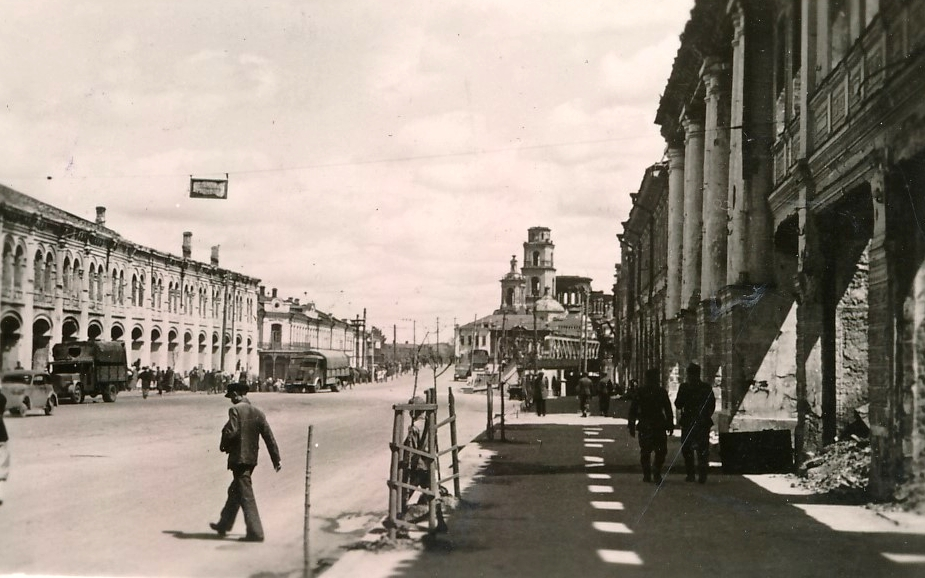
Downtown Oryol (1941)

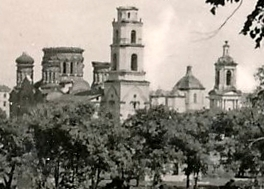
Damaged cultural monuments in Oryol (1941)

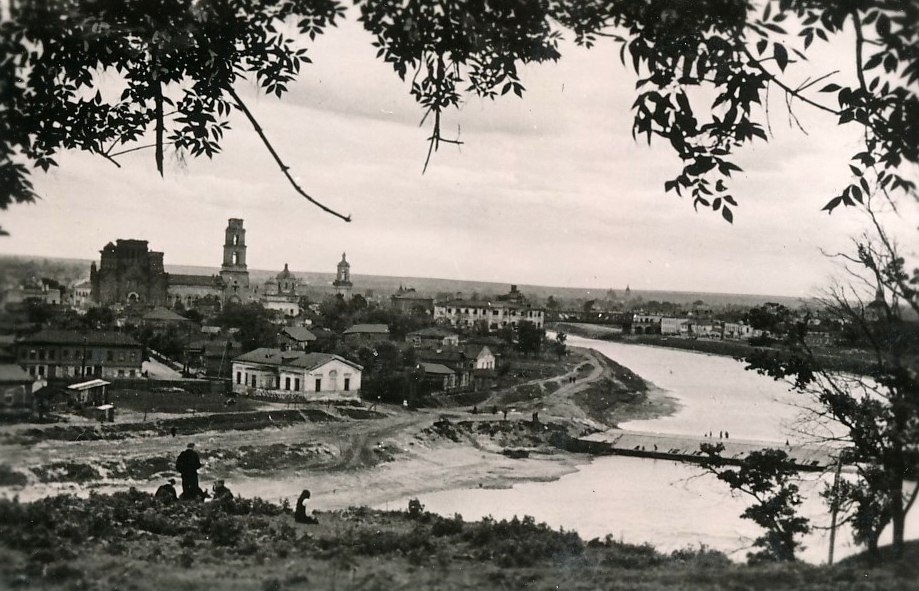
Lower districts of Oryol on the banks of the Oka River (1941)

=== Russian Federation ===
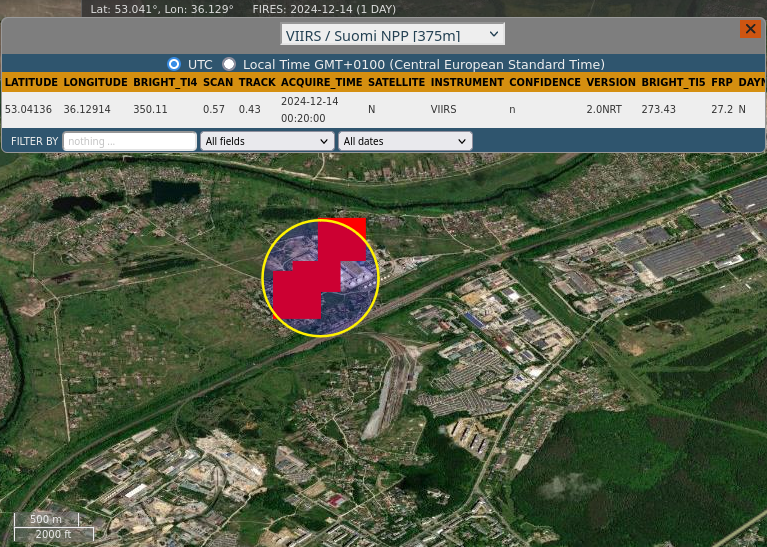
NASA's FIRMS detected fire at a Oryol oil depot on 14 December 2024 00:20:00 (UTC)

On December 14, 2024 during the Russian invasion of Ukraine an oil depot in Oryol was attacked and set on fire by Ukrainian drones. Russian social media reported explosions and the governor confirmed a fire had broken out at an "infrastructure facility". A fire at the oil depot was detected by NASA's FIRMS.

== Geography ==
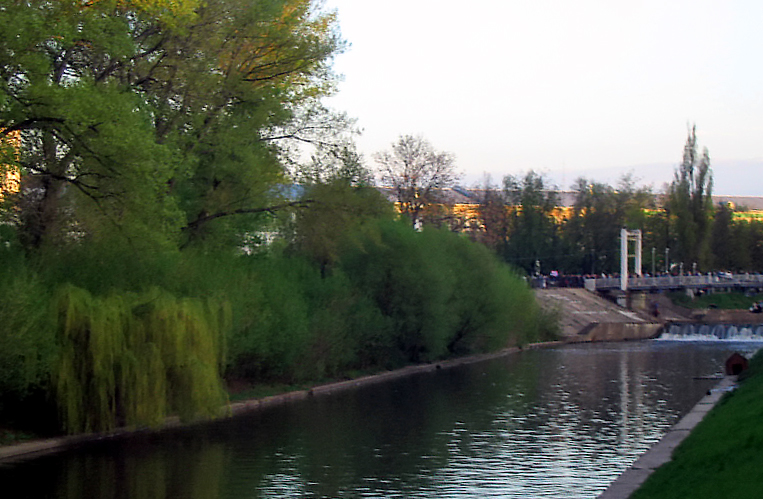
Orlik River

=== Time zone ===
Oryol has the same time zone as Moscow (Moscow time), or UTC+03:00.

=== Location ===
Oryol stands on the banks of the Oka River and its tributary Orlik river in the Central Russian Upland of the East European Plain, approximately 368 km (229 mi) south-southwest of Moscow.

=== Layout ===
Oryol was founded at the behest of Ivan the Terrible in 1566, in the area between the Oka and Orlik rivers. Little information exists about its early history; the earliest data available refers to 1636, when the city was rebuilt after its destruction during the Time of Troubles. According to historian T. G. Svistunova, the 16th-century Oryol fortress had three lines of fortifications and consisted of a city, an ostrog and a posad surrounded by gaps. The city housed a cathedral, a voivode's (warlord or military leader's) house, government buildings and courts for the boyar children; the prison consisted of gunners' yards, a blacksmith, and two parish churches near the prison towers. In the posad was a sloboda. In 1636, Oryol was rebuilt by the voivode B. Koltovsky; it expanded with annexation of land beyond the Oka. Oryol remained a fortress city with a corresponding garrison; Pushkarskaya Sloboda was still located in the prison, boyar children and nobles settled on the left bank of the Orlik, and a Cossack sloboda developed near the Oka. Oryol lost its military character after the 1689 fire, when the partially-burned city fortress was not rebuilt.

In central Oryol, streets fan out from the fortress; two main axes are the Upper and Lower Korchak Roads. Opposite the fortress was probably a second marketplace in the Zaotsk section, where the dragoon settlements had a relatively-regular layout along the river. Away from the river, the grid becomes a fan. The city – its fortress, three marketplaces, two monasteries and a number of parish churches – was developed from the river. Its structure was visible from the Oka: the central fortress, the fan-shaped center and the grid of the Zaotsk settlements. The city was connected by bridges, making Oryol a military fortress and a trade center.

The city's earliest plans, by Mikhail Buzovlev and Petr Botvinev, date to 1728. A 1778 plan fixed its radial layout, and a radial-semicircular system was proposed the following year. In 1848, a new plan including Polesskaya Square was approved.

Oryol's modern layout was developed in 1939 by Suborov, an architect at the leningrad-based Russian State Research and Design Institute of Urbanism. The first post-war reconstruction plan was made in Lengiprogor under the direction of architect V. A. Gaikovich. Oryol's development required a new general plan, which was drawn up in 1958 by V. A. Gaikovich and A. M. Suborov of Lengiprogor. The city's center was Lenin Square, on which the House of Soviets was built in 1961. In 1966, construction of flood-control embankments in the central city began.

=== Climate ===
Oryol has a humid continental climate (Köppen climate classification Dfb). Winters are moderately cold and changeable. The first half is softer, second with often warmings. Summers are warm, in separate years — they can be rainy or hot and dry.

Climate data for Oryol (1991–2020, extremes 1948–present)
Month	Jan	Feb	Mar	Apr	May	Jun	Jul	Aug	Sep	Oct	Nov	Dec	Year
Record high °C (°F)	7.4 (45.3)	9.4 (48.9)	23.0 (73.4)	29.0 (84.2)	32.8 (91.0)	35.4 (95.7)	38.7 (101.7)	39.5 (103.1)	31.3 (88.3)	26.3 (79.3)	17.5 (63.5)	9.7 (49.5)	39.5 (103.1)
Mean daily maximum °C (°F)	−3.6 (25.5)	−2.8 (27.0)	3.0 (37.4)	12.9 (55.2)	20.1 (68.2)	23.5 (74.3)	25.6 (78.1)	24.6 (76.3)	18.2 (64.8)	10.5 (50.9)	2.5 (36.5)	−2.1 (28.2)	11.0 (51.8)
Daily mean °C (°F)	−6.1 (21.0)	−5.8 (21.6)	−0.8 (30.6)	7.6 (45.7)	14.3 (57.7)	17.9 (64.2)	19.8 (67.6)	18.5 (65.3)	12.7 (54.9)	6.4 (43.5)	0.0 (32.0)	−4.3 (24.3)	6.7 (44.1)
Mean daily minimum °C (°F)	−8.7 (16.3)	−8.9 (16.0)	−4.3 (24.3)	2.8 (37.0)	8.7 (47.7)	12.4 (54.3)	14.5 (58.1)	12.9 (55.2)	8.0 (46.4)	3.0 (37.4)	−2.2 (28.0)	−6.7 (19.9)	2.6 (36.7)
Record low °C (°F)	−35.4 (−31.7)	−37.2 (−35.0)	−37.8 (−36.0)	−17.2 (1.0)	−5 (23)	−0.4 (31.3)	3.9 (39.0)	−2.2 (28.0)	−5 (23)	−13 (9)	−26.4 (−15.5)	−35 (−31)	−37.8 (−36.0)
Average precipitation mm (inches)	46 (1.8)	41 (1.6)	39 (1.5)	40 (1.6)	50 (2.0)	69 (2.7)	87 (3.4)	54 (2.1)	57 (2.2)	56 (2.2)	44 (1.7)	47 (1.9)	630 (24.8)
Average extreme snow depth cm (inches)	14 (5.5)	22 (8.7)	15 (5.9)	1 (0.4)	0 (0)	0 (0)	0 (0)	0 (0)	0 (0)	0 (0)	2 (0.8)	7 (2.8)	22 (8.7)
Average rainy days	6	5	8	13	14	15	15	12	15	14	11	8	136
Average snowy days	23	21	14	4	0.4	0	0	0	0.3	3	13	22	101
Average relative humidity (%)	84	82	77	68	64	71	72	72	78	82	87	86	77
Source: Pogoda.ru.net

== Administrative and municipal status ==
Oryol is the administrative center of the oblast and, within the framework of administrative divisions, it also serves as the administrative center of Orlovsky District, even though it is not a part of it. As an administrative division, it is incorporated separately as the city of oblast significance of Oryol—an administrative unit with the status equal to that of the districts. As a municipal division, the city of oblast significance of Oryol is incorporated as Oryol Urban Okrug.

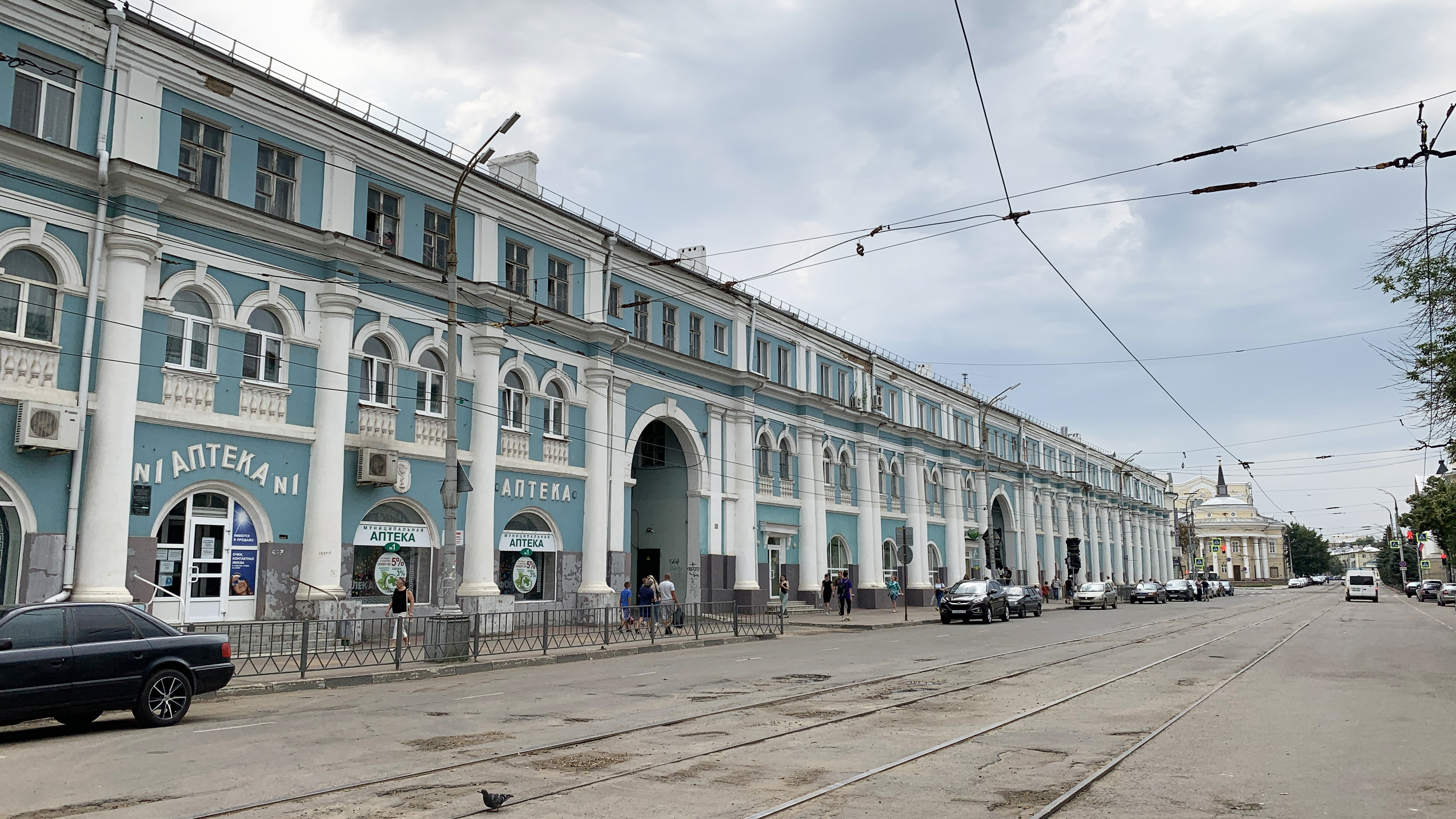
Trade rows

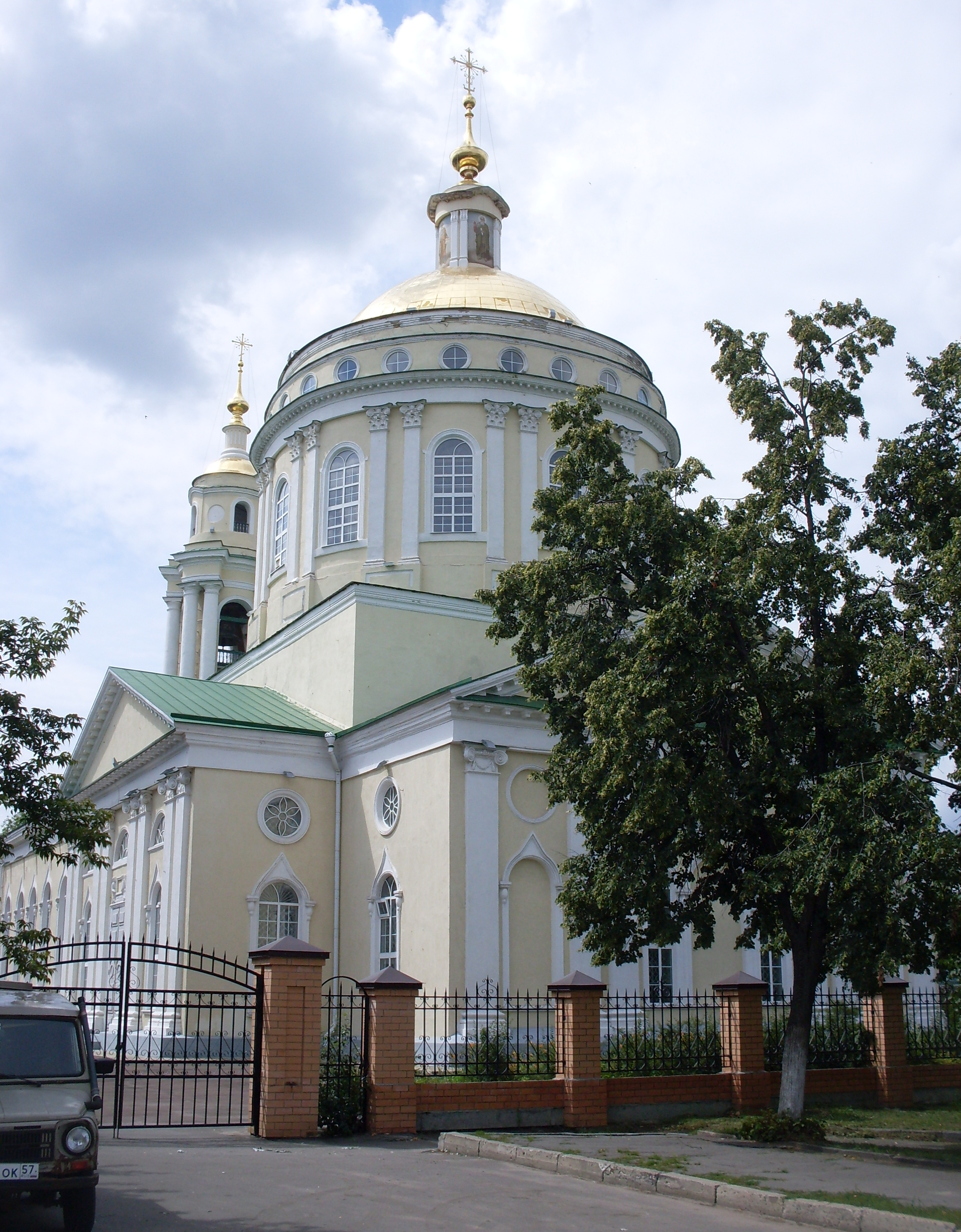
Saint Michael Orthodox Church

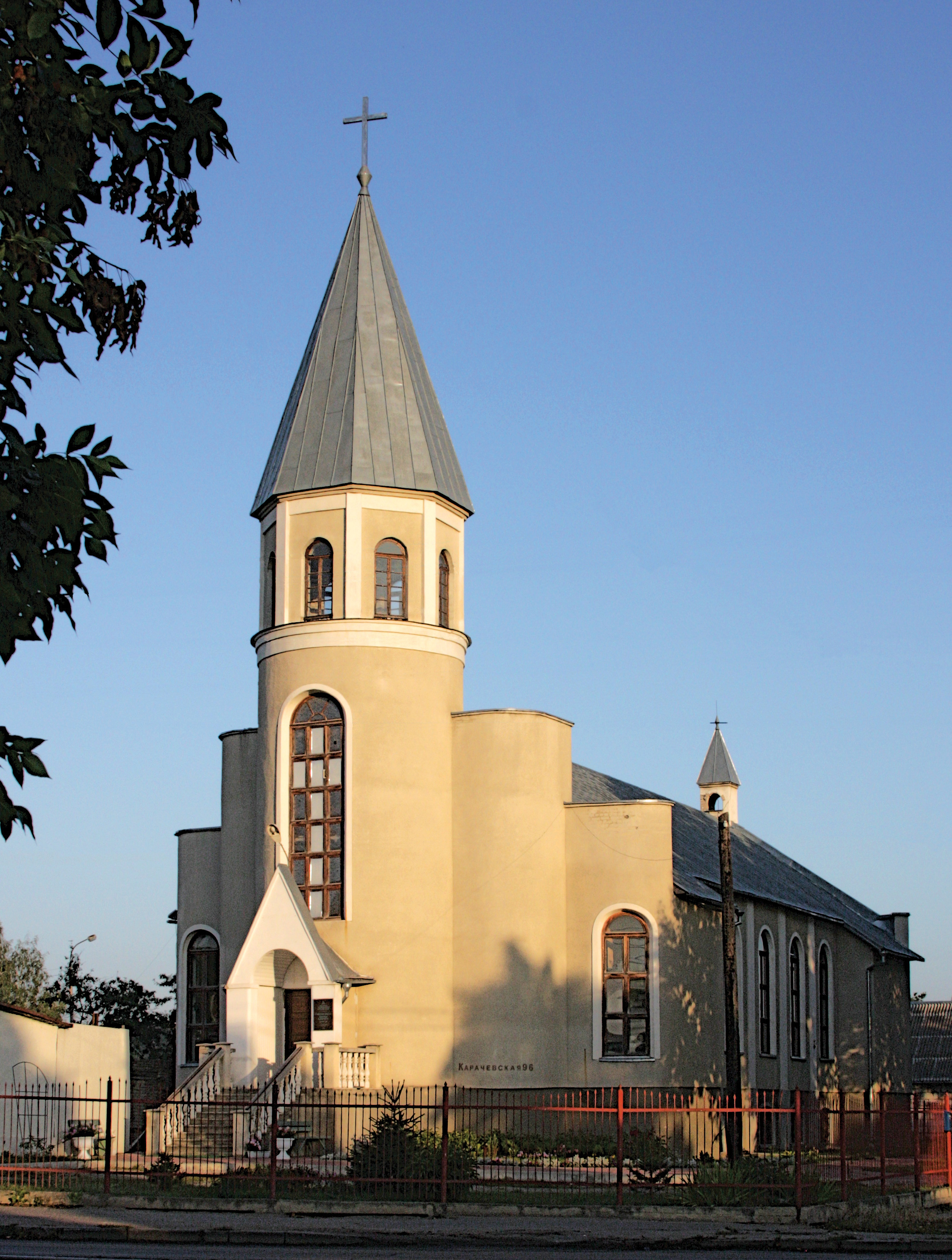
Adventist Church

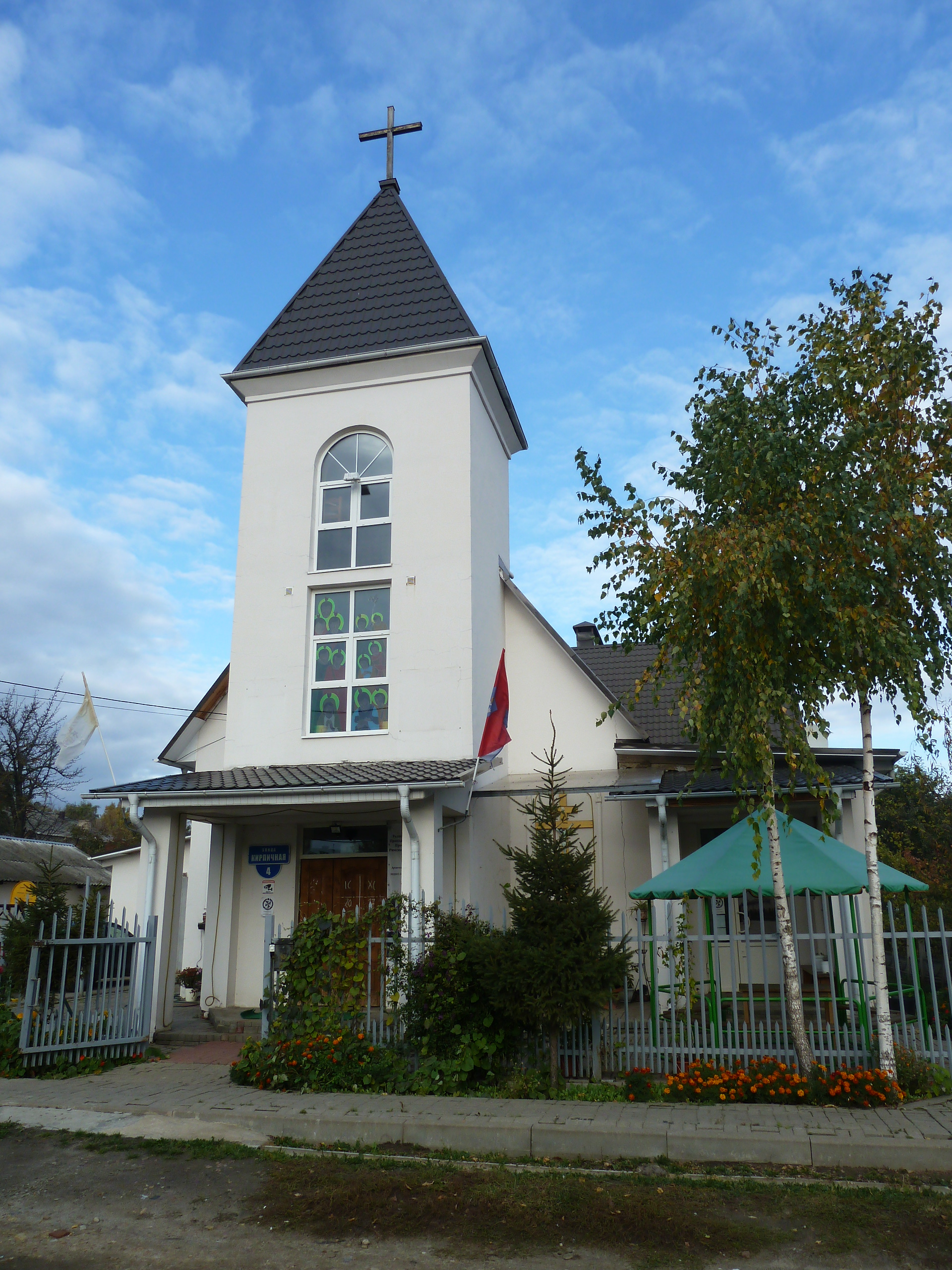
Immaculate Conception Catholic Church

=== City districts ===
Administratively, the city is divided into four districts:

- Severny District — population: 65,815 (2021)
- Sovietsky District — population: 74,315 (2021)
- Zheleznodorozhny District — population: 60,278 (2021)
- Zavodskoy District — population: 103,288 (2021) (the biggest, oldest, and most populous)

== Politics ==
In February 2012, the city duma abolished the direct election of mayor. In December 2013, a referendum was held and 71% of the people supported the return of direct mayoral election.

=== Mayors ===
- 1991–1997: Alexander Kislyakov
- 1997–2002: Yefim Velkovsky
- 2002–2006: Vasily Uvarov
- 2006–2009: Alexander Kasyanov
- 2009–2010: Vasily Eremin
- 2010–2012: Viktor Safianov
- 2012–2015: Sergey Stupin
- 2015–2020: Vasily Novikov
- 2020–present: Yuri Parakhin

City-managers:

- 2012–2015: Mikhail Bernikov
- 2015–2017: Andrey Usikov
- 2017–2020: Alexander Muromsky

== Demographics ==
Historical population
Year	Pop.	±%
1897	70,000	—
1926	75,594	+8.0%
1939	110,564	+46.3%
1959	151,521	+37.0%
1970	232,216	+53.3%
1979	304,971	+31.3%
1989	336,862	+10.5%
2002	333,310	−1.1%
2010	317,747	−4.7%
2021	303,169	−4.6%
Source: Census data

According to the Federal State Statistics Service, in January 2020 the number of residents came to 308 838. It is the 66th place among 1117 cities of Russia for 2019.

Largest ethnic groups in 2010:

- Russians (96,8%)
- Ukrainians (1,1%)
- Armenians (0,4%)
- Belarusians (0,3%)
- Azerbaijanis (0,2%)
- Tatars (0,1%)
- Jews (0,1%)

== Transportation ==
The formation of the Oryol as an important transportation hub is due to the favorable geographical position of the city on the borders of the Central and Central Black Earth economic regions.

The city has trolley, tram and bus systems. These kinds of public transport cover the entire territory of the city. Each bus, tram and trolley is equipped with route indicators that inform about the route through the city, designated stops. There are also taxis and rental cars.

In past years, in the summer on the Oka River waterbus operated as a form of transport excursion and walking orientation.

=== Automotive ===
In the Oryol converge several federal and regional highways:

- E105 / M 2 "Crimea"
- R 92
- R 119
- R 120
- 54А-1
- 54К-16

The main intercity terminal: Oryol Bus Station

==== Trolleybus ====
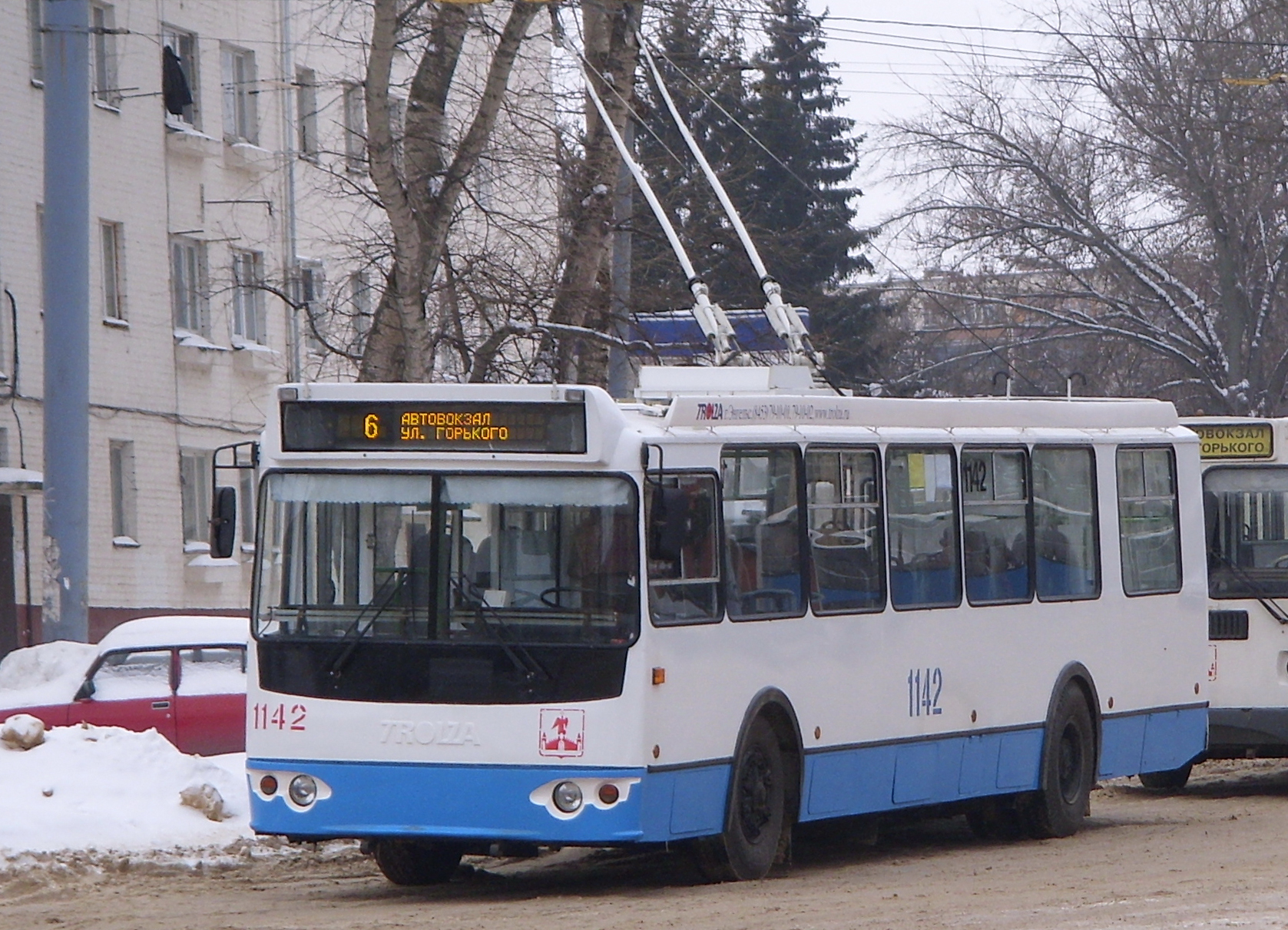
ZiU-682 trolleybus

On 29 October 1968, a regular movement was opened. Length of the contact network 76.51 km (47.54 mi). There are 4 routes for 2019.

=== Railway ===
Since 1868, there has been a railway connection between Oryol and Moscow. Here converge 5 railway lines: on Yelets, Moscow, Kursk, Bryansk, Mikhailovsky mine.

The main terminals: Oryol Station, Station Luzhki-Oryol.

==== Tram ====
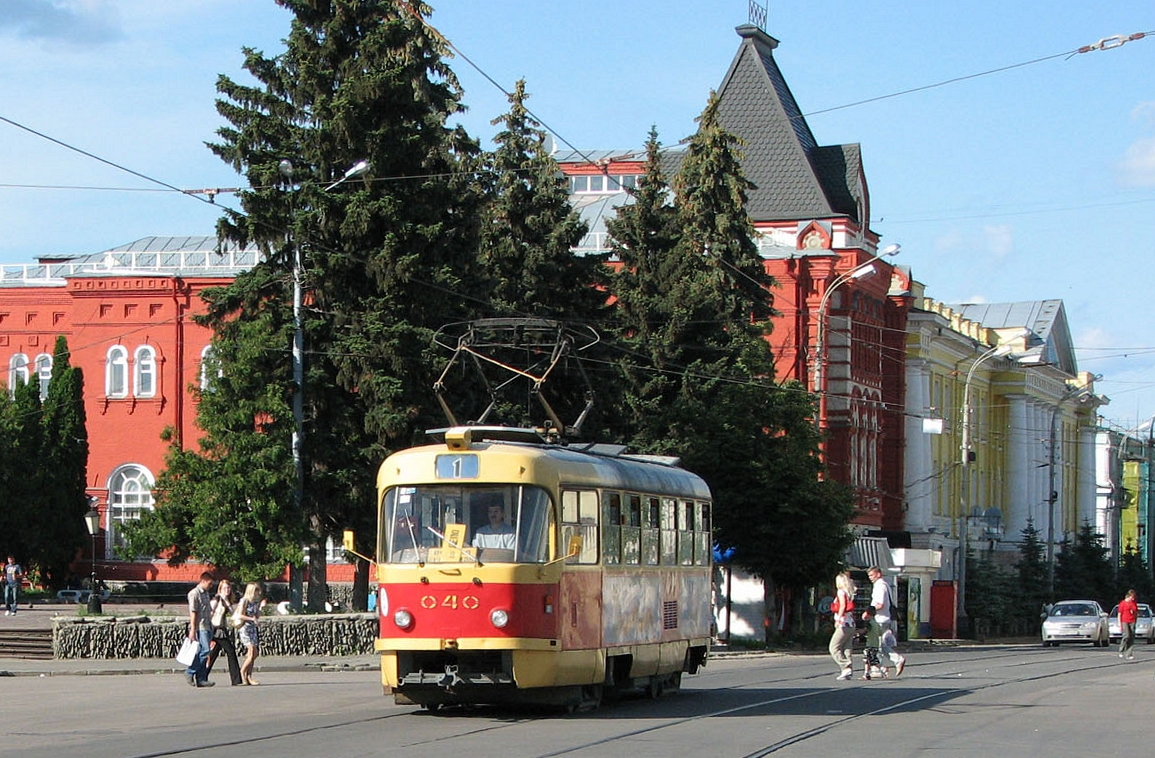
Tatra T3SU tram

Tram map of Oryol (2020)

On November 3, 1898, Oryol inaugurated an electric tram. The draft was prepared by the Belgian entrepreneur FF Gilon and firm «Compagnie mutuelle de tramways», which won the right to build not only a tram, but also lighting in the city. Oryol tram is one of the oldest electric tram systems in Russia. It is 1 year older than Moscow and 9 years — St. Petersburg. In 2017, the length of the lines in double-track calculation was 18.3 km (11.4 mi). For 2019, there are 3 routes, which are operated: Tatra T3 (74 units), Tatra T6B5 (13 units), 71-403 (1 unit), 71-405 (1 unit).

=== Aerial ===
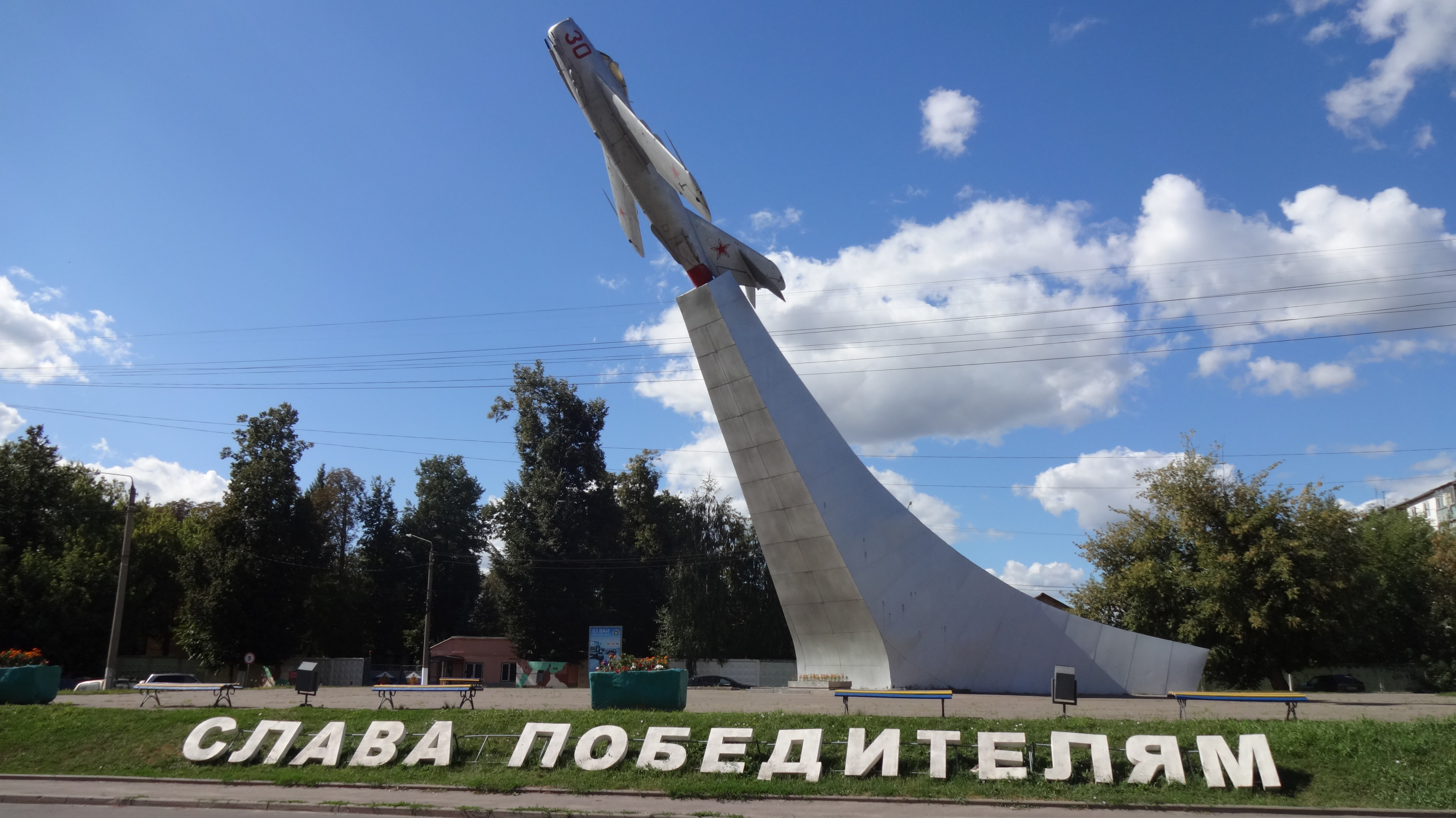
Monument (MiG-17) to Soviet pilots who fought for the liberation of Oryol land from Nazi invaders (photo 2018)

The city is served by the Oryol Yuzhny Airport, which is currently not working.

== Education ==
There are six institutions of higher education in Oryol, as well as four branches of such institutions from other cities.

Local

- Oryol Law Institute
- Oryol State Agrarian University
- Oryol State Institute of Culture
- Oryol State Institute of Economics and Trade
- Oryol State University
- Russian Federation Security Guard Service Federal Academy

Branches

- Oryol Branch of the Russian University of Transport (Moscow)
- Oryol Branch of the Russian Presidential Academy of National Economy and Public Administration (Moscow)
- Oryol branch of the Financial University under the Government of the Russian Federation (Moscow)
- Oryol branch of the Voronezh Institute of Economics and Law (Voronezh)

== International cooperation ==
=== Twin towns – sister cities ===
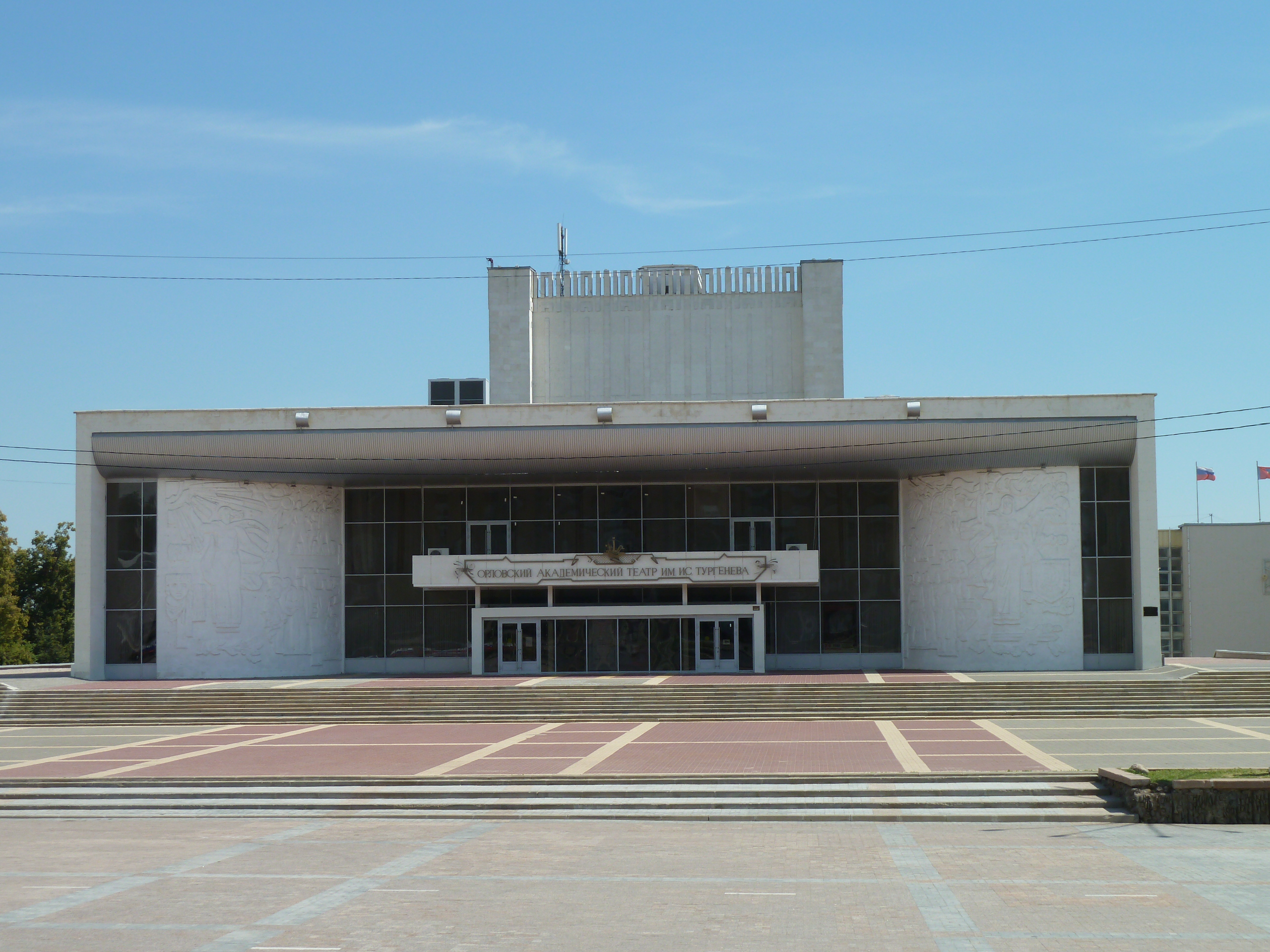
Oryol State Academic Theater

Oryol is twinned with:

- Razgrad, Bulgaria (1968)
- Offenbach am Main, Germany (1988)
- Leeuwarden, The Netherlands (1990–2002)
- Zhodzina, Belarus (2016)
- Mary, Turkmenistan (2017)

=== Partner cities ===
- Kaluga, Russia (2003)
- Kolpino, Russia (2010)
- Kolpinsky District, Russia (2010)
- Novosibirsk, Russia (2014)
- Volokolamsky District, Russia (2014)
- Novi Sad, Serbia (2017)
- Maribor, Slovenia (2017)
- Penza, Russia (2018)

== Notable people ==
- Leonid Andreyev (1871–1919), writer
- Mikhail Bakhtin (1895–1975), literary critic
- Fedor Baranov (1886–1965), fisheries scientist
- Denis Boytsov (born 1986), boxer
- Yulia Bravikova (born 1999), rhythmic gymnast
- Felix Dzerzhinsky (1877–1926), security chief
- Afanasy Fet (1820–1892), poet
- Nikolai Getman (1917–2004), painter and Gulag survivor
- Timofey Granovsky (1813–1855), historian
- Vasily Kalinnikov (1866–1901), composer
- Yakov Kasman (born 1967), pianist
- Anna Petrovna Kern (1800–1879), socialite
- Stanislav Lebamba (born 1988), association football player
- Josef Lhévinne (1874–1944), pianist and piano teacher
- Nikolai Leskov (1831–1895), novelist
- Denis Menchov (born 1978), cyclist
- Artem Mikoyan (1905–1970), founder of the MiG aircraft manufacturer
- Alexander Nikishin (born 2001), professional ice hockey player in the NHL for the Carolina Hurricanes
- Fritz Noether (1884–1941), mathematician
- Nikolai Polikarpov (1892–1944), aviation designer
- Yevgeni Preobrazhensky (1886–1937), statesman
- Vladimir Karlovich Roth (1848–1916), neuropathologist
- Valerian Safonovich (1798–1867), statesman
- Aleksandr Selikhov (born 1994), footballer
- Alexey Stakhanov (1906–1977), celebrated miner/engineer
- Pyotr Stolypin (1862–1911), statesman
- Maksymilian Stratanowski (1913–1987), painter
- Yakov Sverdlov (1885–1919), Bolshevik revolutionary
- Ivan Turgenev (1818–1883), novelist and playwright
- Aleksey Petrovich Yermolov (1777–1861), military general
- Gennady Zyuganov (born 1944), politician
