= Oryol Law Institute =

Law enforcement training center of the Russian Ministry of Interior

Oryol Law Institute of the Ministry of the Interior of the Russian Federation named after V. V. Lukyanov (Lukyanov Oryol Law Institute of the Ministry of the Interior of Russia)
- Орловский юридический институт Министерства внутренних дел Российской Федерации имени В. В. Лукьянова (ОрЮИ МВД России имени В. В. Лукьянова)
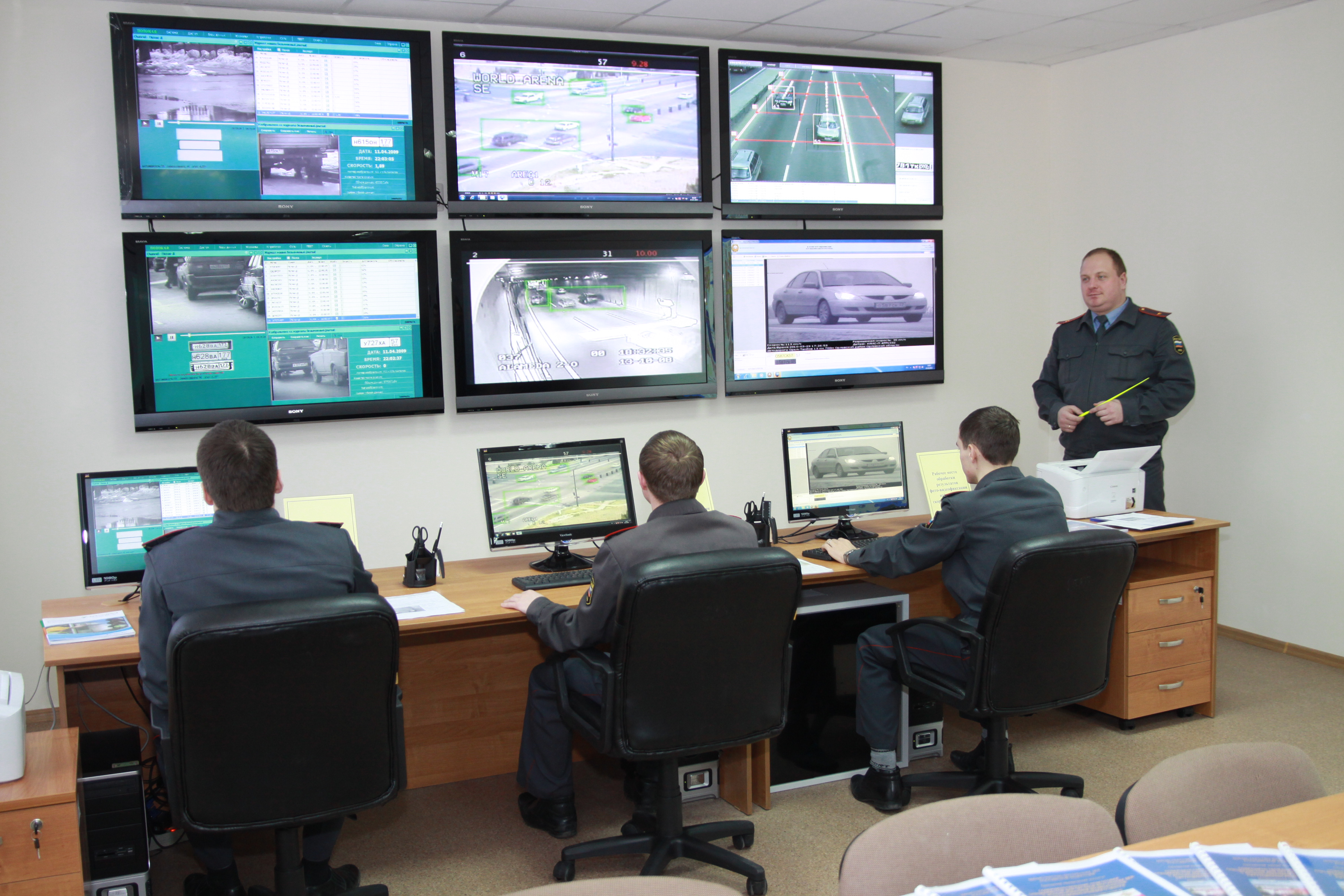
- Former names: Oryol Special Secondary School of the Ministry of the Interior of the USSR; Oryol Higher School of the Ministry of the Interior of the RSFSR; Oryol Law Institute of the Ministry of the Interior of Russia
- Type: Police academy
- Established: 20 April 1976
- Rector: Major General of Police Sergey Andreevich Sinenko
- Students: ~2000
- Location: 2 Ignatov street, Oryol, Russia; 52°59′28″N 36°04′26″E
- Campus: Urban
- Website: orui.mvd.ru

Oryol Law Institute of the Ministry of the Interior of the Russian Federation named after V. V. Lukyanov or Lukyanov Oryol Law Institute of the Ministry of the Interior of Russia (Oryol Law Institute; Russian: Орловский юридический институт Министерства внутренних дел Российской Федерации имени В. В. Лукьянова; ОрЮИ МВД России имени В. В. Лукьянова, Orlovskiy yuridicheskiy institut Ministerstva vnutrennikh del Rossiyskoy Federatsii imeni V. V. Luk'yanova; OrYUI MVD Rossii imeni V. V. Luk'yanova) is a state institute for training, retraining and advanced training for law enforcement agencies of the Ministry of the Interior of Russia, located in the city of Oryol, the administrative centre of Oryol Oblast.

== History ==
On 20 April 1976, the Minister of Interior of the USSR Nikolai Shchelokov ordered the creation of the Oryol Special Secondary School of the Ministry of the Interior of the USSR (Russian: Орловская специальная средняя школа милиции МВД СССР; OSSShM of MIA USSR). This school was created on the basis of the interregional school for the training of junior and middle commanding militsiya officers. The basis of the teaching staff of the school was made up of employees with a big practical experience in law enforcement. The first graduation of OSSShM cadets took place in August 1978.

In 1991, on the basis of OSSShM, the Oryol Higher School of the Ministry of the Interior of the RSFSR (Russian: Орловская высшая школа МВД РСФСР; Orlovskaya vysshaya shkola MVD RSFSR) was created. On 17 May 1997, the Government of Russia transformed the school into the Oryol Law Institute of the Ministry of the Interior of Russia. From 1 September 2008, the institute began to train specialists for traffic police units (GIBDD).

On 30 May 2013, the Minister of Interior of Russia Vladimir Kolokoltsev awarded the Oryol Law Institute the honorary name of Honoured Lawyer of Russia, Doctor of Law, Lieutenant General of militia Valery Vitalyevich Lukyanov.

== Educational and operational activities ==
The institute includes 4 faculties (Faculty of training of traffic police specialists; Faculty of training investigators; Faculty of distance learning; Faculty of vocational training, retraining and advanced training), 14 divisions (chairs), 5 sections, and 8 auxiliary units.

The term of study is 5 years.

== Gallery ==
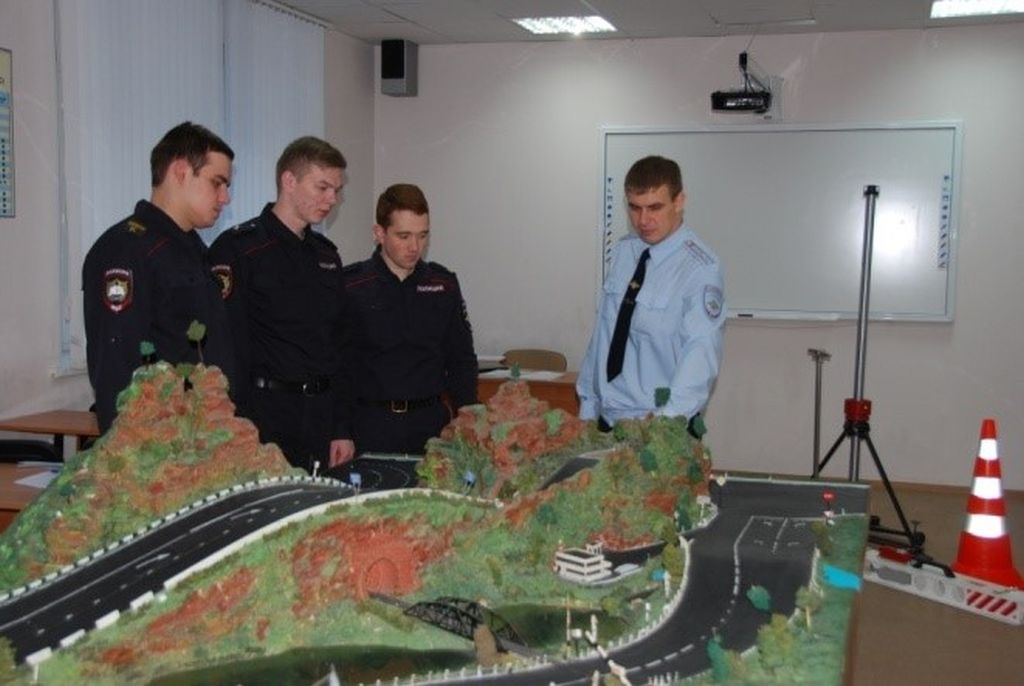
Class of road inspection and traffic organization

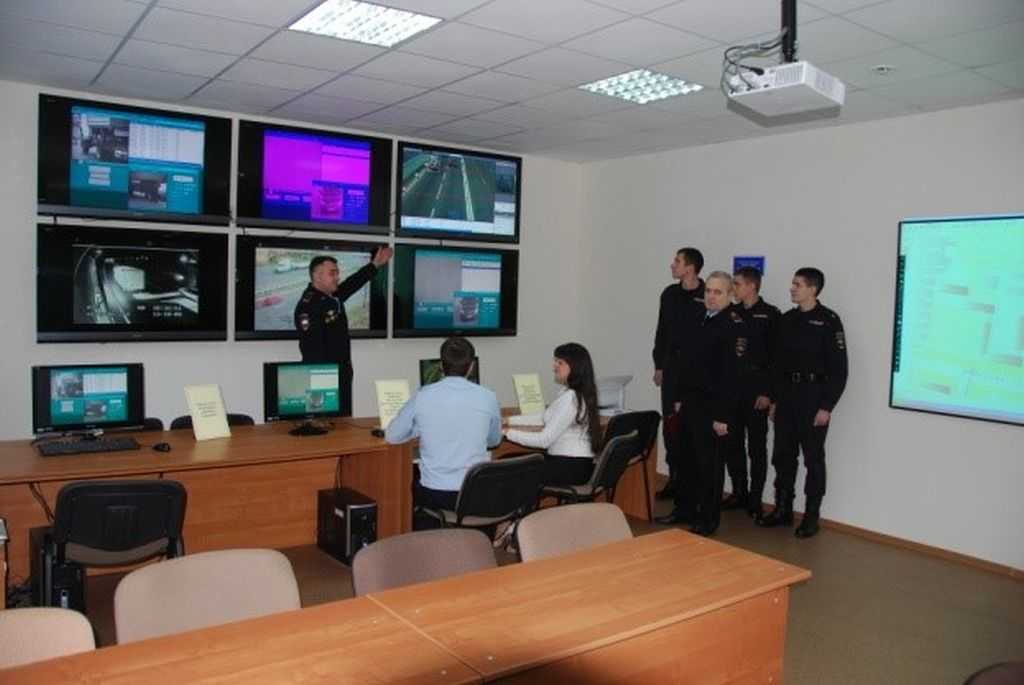
Training centre for the operational management of traffic police units

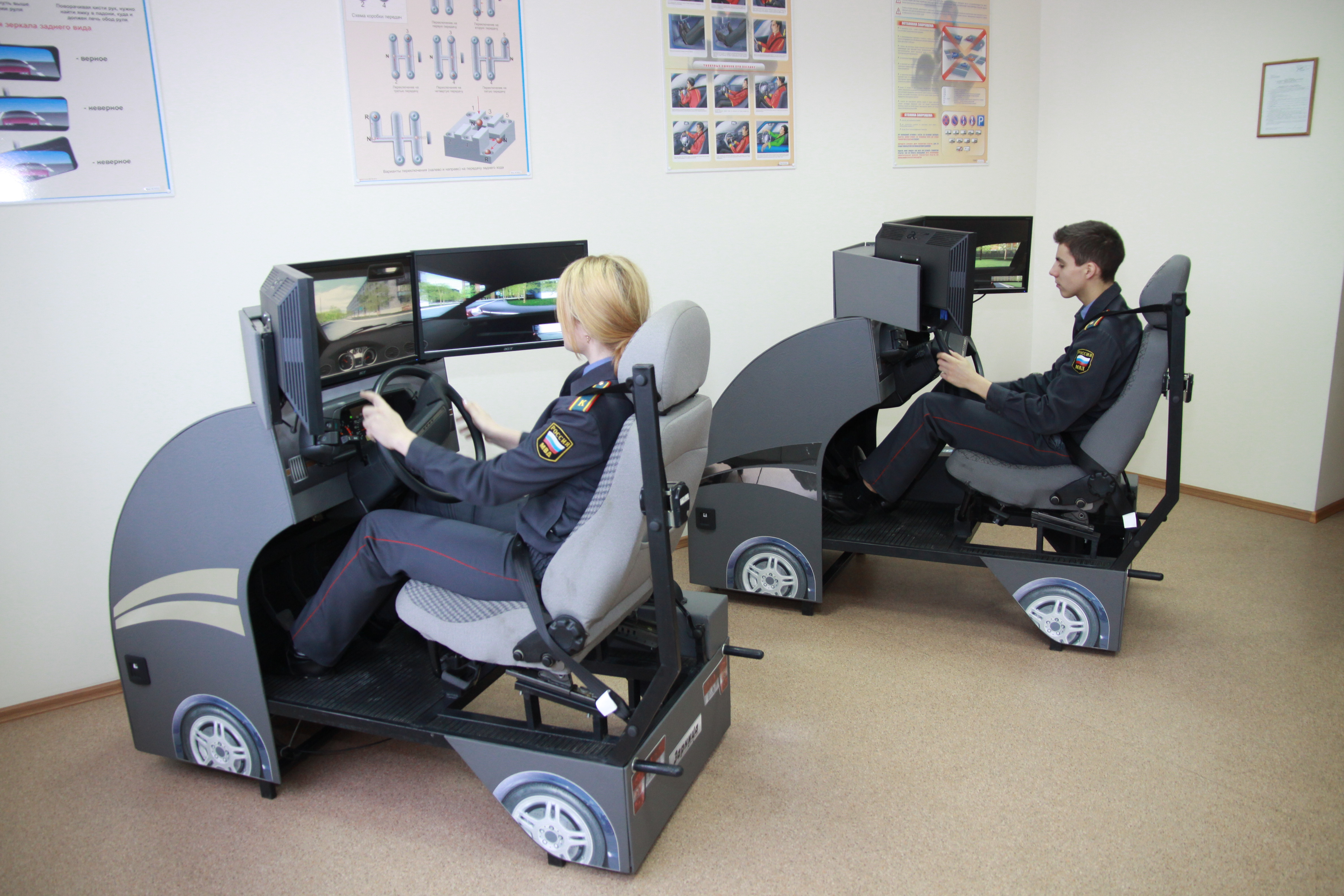
Driving training class

== Sources ==
- Орловский юридический институт МВД России. 1976-2006 г.г. (in Russian). Oryol: Veshniye vody [Torrents of Spring]. 2006.
