= Orlovsky, Rostov Oblast =

Orlovsky Орловский
- Posyolok
- Interactive map of Orlovsky
- Location of Orlovsky Orlovsky (Rostov Oblast)
- Coordinates: 46°52′17″N 42°03′33″E
- Country: Russia
- Federal subject: Rostov Oblast
- Administrative district: Orlovsky District, Rostov Oblast
- Founded: 1910

Population (2010 Census)
  - Total: 18,757
  - Estimate (2021): 18,094 (−3.5%)
- Time zone: UTC+3 (MSK)
- Postal code: 347510
- OKTMO ID: 60642446101

Orlovsky (Russian: Орловский) is a rural locality (a posyolok) in Orlovsky District of Rostov Oblast, Russia. Population: 18,757 (2010 census); 19,354 (2002 census). It is also the administrative center of Orlovsky District.

== History ==
Orlovsky was founded as a posyolok near Tikhoretskaya—Tsaritsyn line railway station of the Vladikavkaz Railway, which was built in 1896–1898. In 1910 Orlovsky obtained the status of stanitsa. In the same year it began to be quickly settled by cossack families from the villages of the upper Don: from Kurmoiarskaya, Kundriyuchenskaya, Bystryanska, Luganskaya, Semikarakorskaya, Romanovskaya and others.

According to 1915 data, the settlement had 472 households with 2,097 man and 2,092 women. There were several mills, creameries, smithies, a tannery, hay barns, forest exchanges, three churches, twelve primary schools, and a gymnasium.

In March 1920, during Russian Civil War, the village was taken by Red Army. According to data of the first All-Union Census of the Soviet Union, which was held in 1926, Orlovskaya had a population of 4,404 people, of them Russians were 3,264 and Ukrainians were 1,086.

== Places of interest ==
- Tulips peninsula, a place of mass blooming of tulips.
- Church of the Nativity of the Blessed Virgin Mary, a Russian Orthodox church built in 2006.

== Notable residents ==
- Nikita Kolotiyevsky (born 2001), football player
- Sergei Pavlovich (born 1992), mixed martial artist
