= Orlovsky, Novonikolayevsky District, Volgograd Oblast =

Orlovsky Орловский
- Khutor
- Location within Volgograd Oblast Location within Russia
- Coordinates: 51°01′39″N 42°22′39″E
- Country: Russia
- Region: Volgograd Oblast
- District: Novonikolayevsky District
- Time zone: UTC+4:00

Orlovsky (Russian: Орловский) is a rural locality (a khutor) in Novonikolayevskoye Rural Settlement, Novonikolayevsky District, Volgograd Oblast, Russia. The population was 234 as of 2010. There are 16 streets.

== Geography ==
Orlovsky is located in steppe, on the Khopyorsko-Buzulukskaya Plain, 7 km north of Novonikolayevsky (the district's administrative centre) by road. Novonikolayevsky is the nearest rural locality.
