= Orlovsky District =

Location of Kirov Oblast in Russia

Location of Oryol Oblast in Russia

Location of Rostov Oblast in Russia

Orlovsky District is the name of several administrative and municipal districts in Russia. The name is generally derived from or is related to the root "oryol" ("eagle").

- Orlovsky District, Kirov Oblast, an administrative and municipal district of Kirov Oblast
- Orlovsky District, Oryol Oblast, an administrative and municipal district of Oryol Oblast
- Orlovsky District, Rostov Oblast, an administrative and municipal district of Rostov Oblast

== See also ==
- Orlovsky (disambiguation)
