= Orlovsky District, Rostov Oblast =

Orlovsky District Орловский район (Russian)
- District
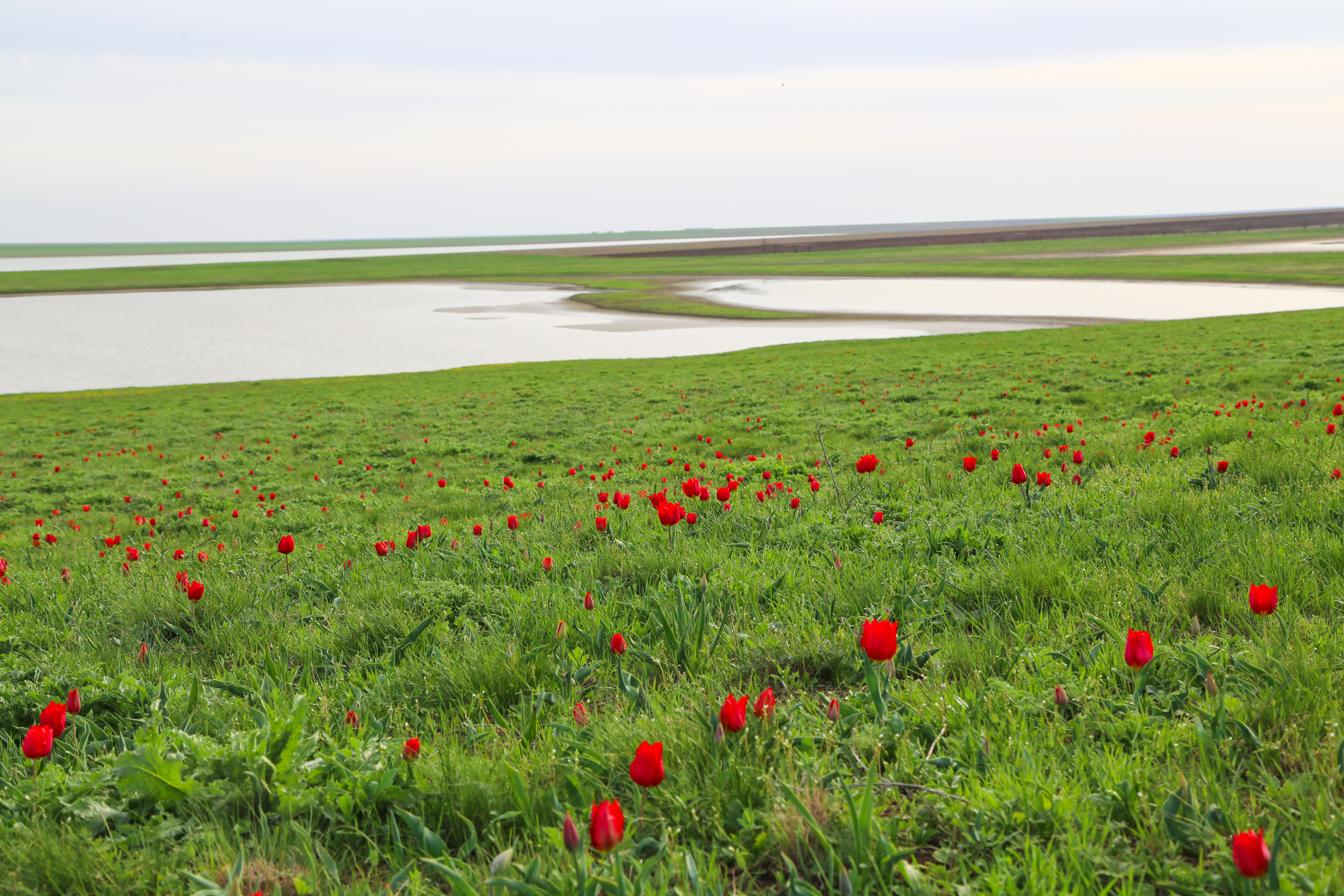
- Rostovsky Nature Reserve, Orlovsky District

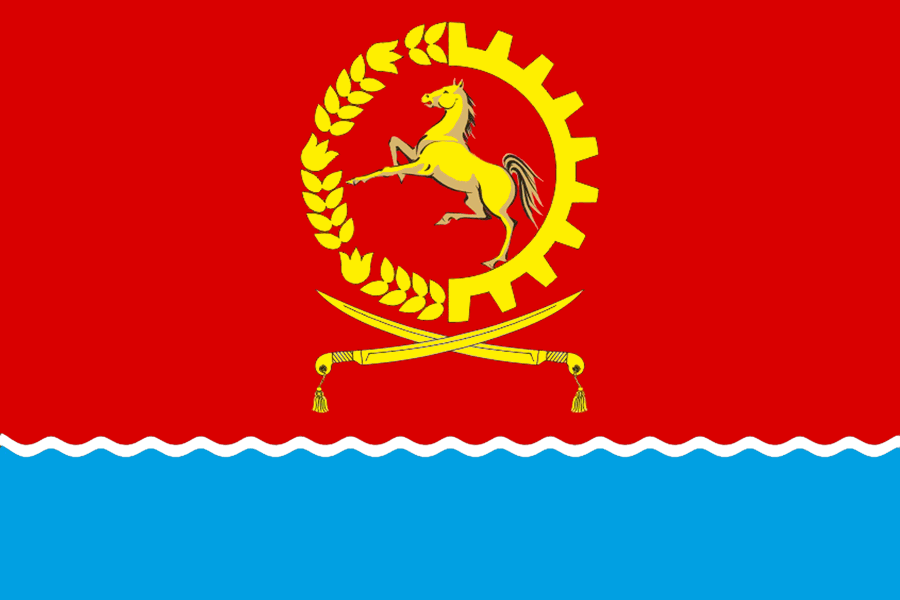
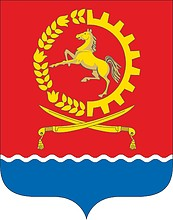
- Flag Coat of arms
- Location of Orlovsky District in Rostov Oblast
- Coordinates: 46°52′17″N 42°03′33″E
- Country: Russia
- Federal subject: Rostov Oblast
- Established: 1924
- Administrative center: Orlovsky

Area
  - Total: 3,300 km^{2} (1,300 sq mi)

Population (2010 Census)
  - Total: 40,894
  - Density: 12/km^{2} (32/sq mi)
  - Urban: 0%
  - Rural: 100%

Administrative structure
  - Administrative divisions: 11 rural settlement
  - Inhabited localities: 61 rural localities

Municipal structure
  - Municipally incorporated as: Orlovsky Municipal District
  - Municipal divisions: 0 urban settlements, 11 rural settlements
- Time zone: UTC+3 (MSK)
- OKTMO ID: 60642000
- Website: http://orlovsky.donland.ru/

Orlovsky District (Russian: Орло́вский райо́н) is an administrative and municipal district (raion), one of the forty-three in Rostov Oblast, Russia. It is located in the southeast of the oblast. The area of the district is 3,300 square kilometers (1,300 sq mi). Its administrative center is the rural locality (a settlement) of Orlovsky. Population: 40,894 (2010 Census); 41,768 (2002 census); 39,386 (1989 Soviet census). The population of the administrative center accounts for 48.9% of the district's total population.
