= MCHS =

MCHS may refer to:

== Schools ==
=== In Australia ===
- Magdalene Catholic High School in Smeaton Grange, New South Wales (Sydney)

=== In Canada ===
- Morinville Community High School in Morinville, Alberta
- Marystown Central High School in Marystown, Newfoundland and Labrador
- Memorial Composite High School in Stony Plain, Alberta

=== In the United Kingdom ===
- Mcauley Catholic High School in Doncaster, South Yorkshire, United Kingdom
- Mearns Castle High School in Newton Mearns, Scotland
- Monkseaton Community High School in Whitley Bay, England
- Meols Cop High School In Southport, England

=== In the United States ===
==== In California ====
- Maria Carrillo High School in Santa Rosa, California
- Marin Catholic High School in Marin County, California
- Milken Community High School in Bel Air, Los Angeles, California
- Mira Costa High School in Manhattan Beach, California
- Moreau Catholic High School in Hayward, California
- Mount Carmel High School in San Diego, California

==== In Illinois ====
- McHenry West High School in Mchenry, Illinois
- McHenry East High School in Mchenry, Illinois
- Mascoutah Community High School in Mascoutah, Illinois
- Minooka Community High School in Minooka, Illinois
- Morris Community High School in Morris, Illinois
- Montini Catholic High School in Lombard, Illinois

==== In Indiana ====
- Madison Consolidated High School in Madison, Indiana.
- Michigan City High School in Michigan City, Indiana.

==== In Kentucky ====
- Madison Central High School (Kentucky) in Richmond

==== In Mississippi ====
- Madison Central High School (Mississippi) in Madison

==== In New York ====
- Massena Central High School in Massena
- Moore Catholic High School in Staten Island, New York City

==== In North Carolina ====
- Mallard Creek High School in Charlotte, North Carolina
- Middle Creek High School in Apex, North Carolina

==== In Tennessee ====
- McMinn County High School in Athens, Tennessee
- McMinn Central High School in Etowah, Tennessee
- Memphis Catholic High School in Memphis, Tennessee

==== In Texas ====
- Mayde Creek High School in Houston, Texas
- McCollum High School in San Antonio, Texas

==== Other schools in the United States ====
- Malden Catholic High School in Malden, Massachusetts
- Manheim Central High School in Manheim, Pennsylvania
- Martin County High School in Stuart, Florida
- Midwest City High School in Midwest City, Oklahoma
- Mill Creek High School in Hoschton, Georgia
- Monroe Catholic High School in Fairbanks, Alaska
- Morgan City High School in Morgan City, Louisiana
- Madison County High School in Madison, Virginia

=== In Japan ===
- Matsuyama Central Senior High School in Matsuyama, Ehime

=== Other schools ===
- Middle College High School (disambiguation), the name of multiple schools
- Marian Catholic High School (disambiguation), the name of multiple schools
- Marquette Catholic High School (disambiguation), the name of multiple schools

== Other uses ==
- Marine Corps Common Hardware Suite
- Milwaukee County Historical Society in Milwaukee, Wisconsin
- Ministry of Emergency Situations, Russia
- Manitowoc County Historical Society in Manitowoc, Wisconsin, United States
- Mayo Clinic Health System
