= Mikhail Mishustin's First Cabinet =

Government of Russia; (2020–2024)

First Cabinet of Mikhail Mishustin
- 56th Cabinet of Russia
- 2020–2024
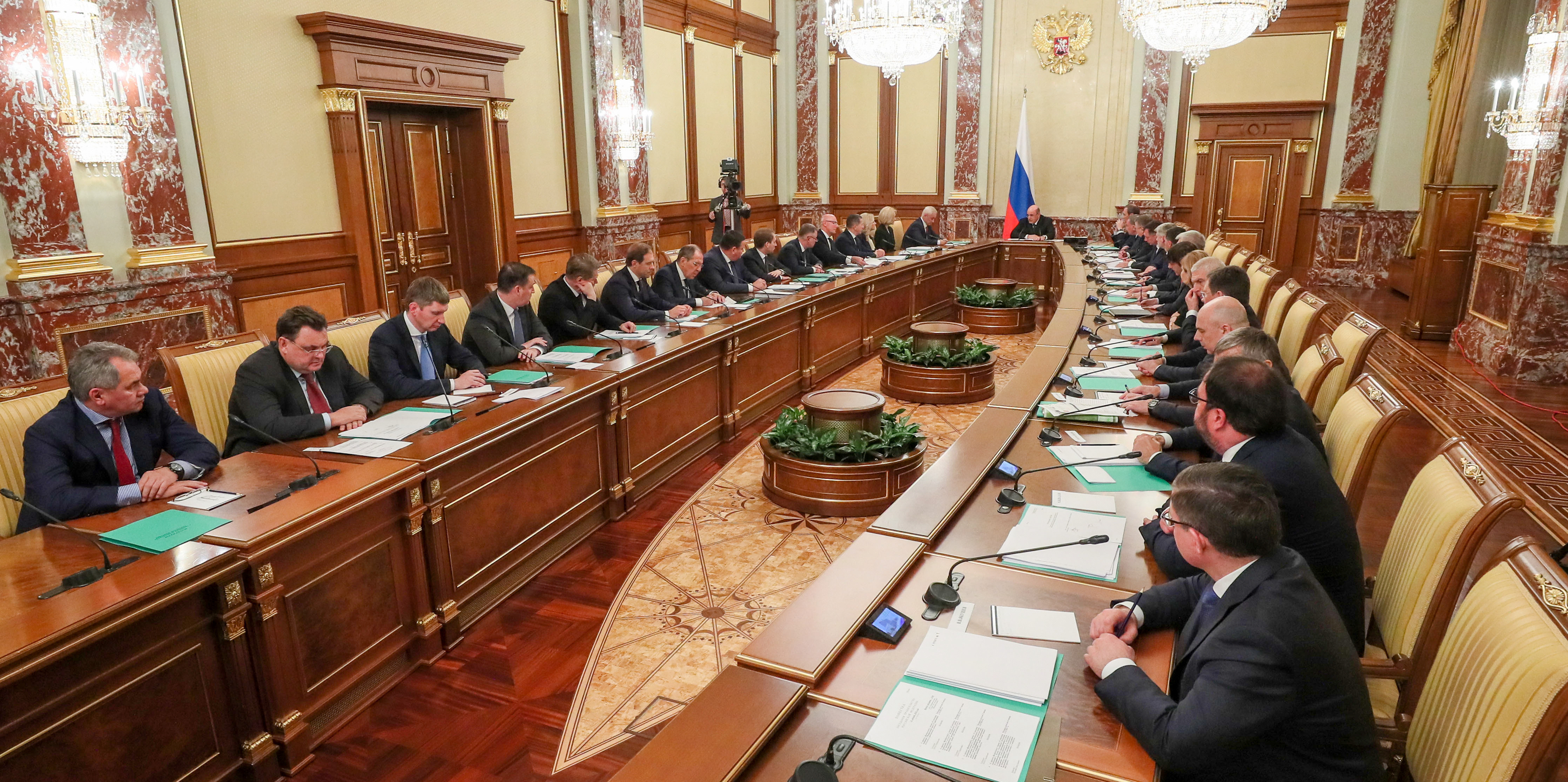
- Meeting of the Cabinet on 21 January 2020
- Date formed: 21 January 2020
- Date dissolved: 7 May 2024

People and organisations
- Head of state: Vladimir Putin
- Head of government: Mikhail Mishustin; Andrey Belousov (acting)
- Member party: United Russia; Independent
- Status in legislature: Majority with support from LDPR, A Just Russia and Rodina
- Opposition parties: Communist Party
- Opposition leaders: Gennady Zyuganov

History
- Legislature terms: 7th State Duma; 8th State Duma
- Budget: 2020, 2021, 2022, 2023, 2024
- Predecessor: Medvedev II
- Successor: Mishustin II

The Mikhail Mishustin's First Cabinet (Russian: Первое правительство Мишустина) was the federal government of Russia from 2020 to 2024, led by Prime Minister Mikhail Mishustin.

The Cabinet was formed between 16 and 21 January 2020 and is the last one following the constitutional reform of 2020 which has significantly changed the order of government formation.

On 30 April 2020 Mishustin tested positive for COVID-19. Mishustin confirmed his test results in a video conference with President Vladimir Putin, and nominated his deputy to take over for him as acting Prime Minister. Putin signed a decree appointing Andrey Belousov to the role on an acting basis, following Mishustin's recommendation. In May, three more ministers also tested positive for coronavirus and were temporarily replaced by their deputies.

Due to the ongoing Russian invasion of Ukraine, all of Mishustin's cabinet was entirely sanctioned by a number of countries and organizations such as the United States, the European Union, France, Ukraine, Japan, Australia, the United Kingdom, Canada, New Zealand and Germany.

The Cabinet resigned on 7 May 2024 after the inauguration of Vladimir Putin. However on Putin's instructions the Cabinet continued its work as a caretaker cabinet.

== Formation ==
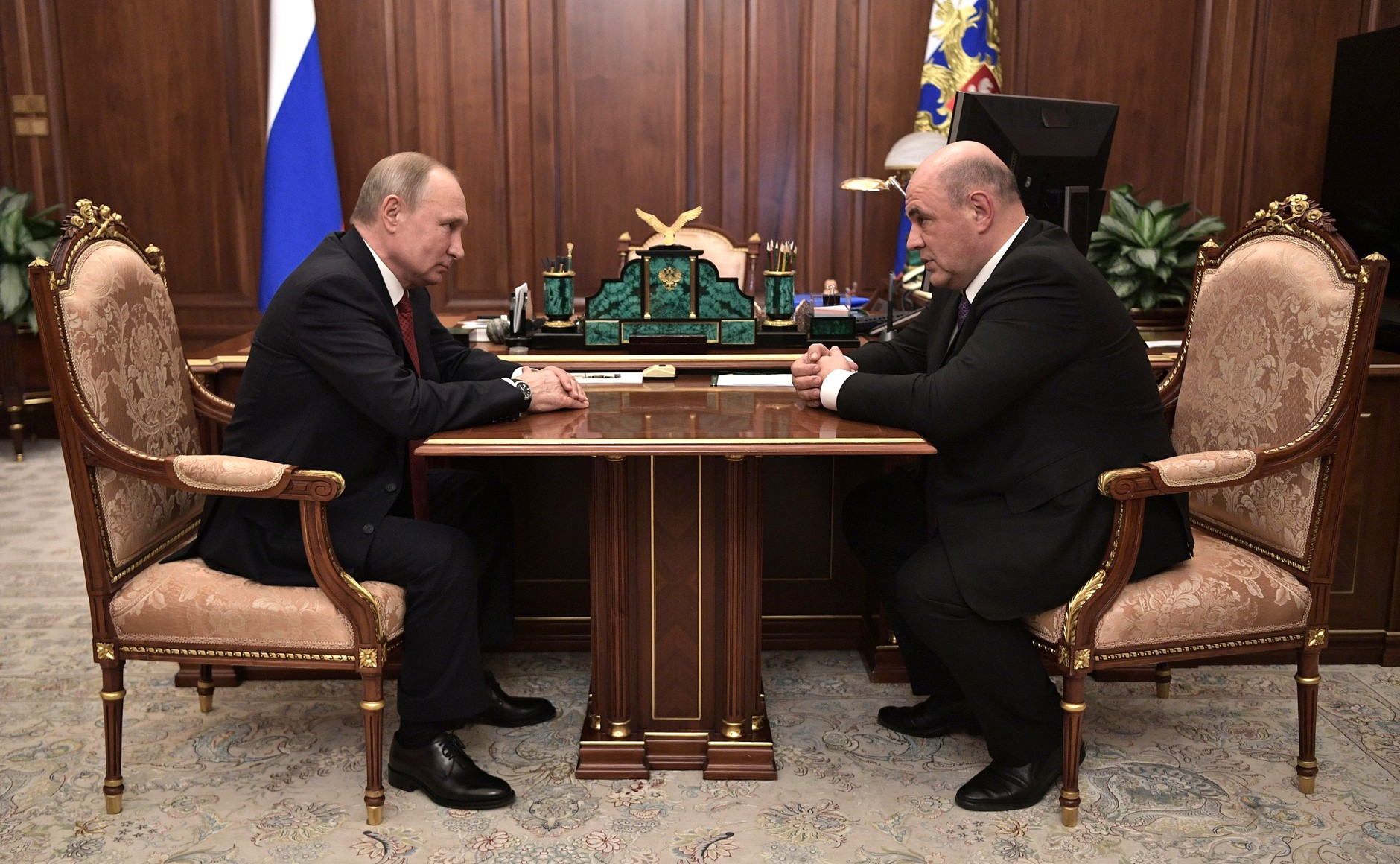
Mishustin with President Vladimir Putin on January 15, 2020

The government began to form after the resignation of Dmitry Medvedev's cabinet on 15 January 2020. Medvedev resigned after President Vladimir Putin, during his Address to the Federal Assembly, proposed amendments to the Constitution that would change the balance of power. On the same day, Putin offered Mishustin the post of Prime Minister. After Mishustin's consent, Putin nominated him for approval to the State Duma. According to Putin, he was offered four candidates, but Mishustin was not among them. As a result, Putin independently decided to nominate Mishustin for the Prime Minister.

On 16 January 2020, after a meeting with Mishustin, United Russia decided to support him. Since United Russia has more than half of the seats in the State Duma, this means that Mishustin would become Prime Minister, even if all other parties voted against it. The Liberal Democratic Party and A Just Russia also expressed support for Mishustin.

The Communist Party, after meeting with Mishustin, said that it would abstain from voting. Gennady Zyuganov explained this by saying that the composition and program of the new Cabinet is unknown. However, since President Putin fulfilled the requirements of the Communist party, namely, dismissed the Medvedev government and proposed to expand the powers of the Parliament, the Communist party will not vote against the appointment of Mishustin.

=== State Duma confirmation ===
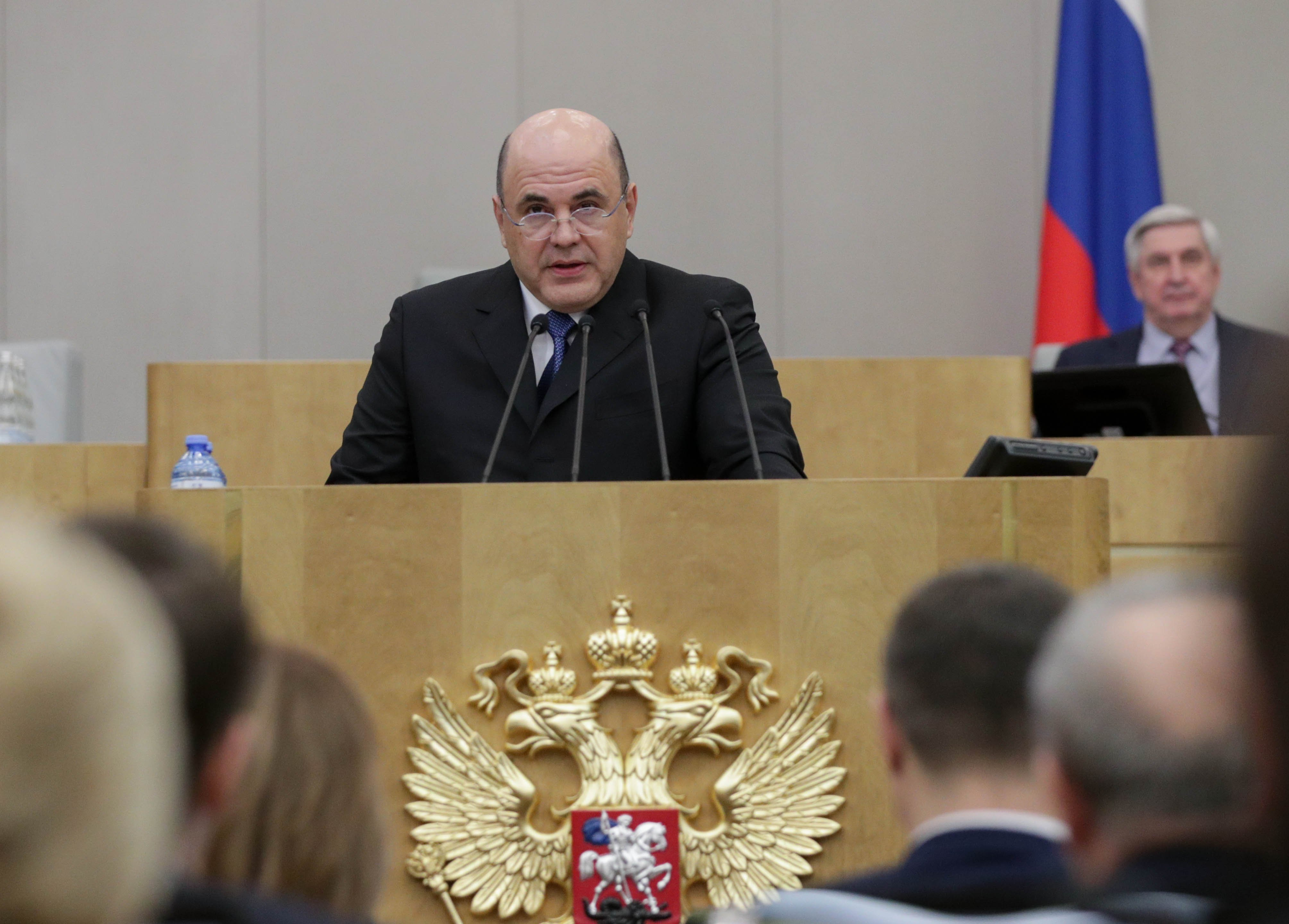
Mishustin at his confirmation hearing on January 16, 2020

On 16 January, Mikhail Mishustin was confirmed by the State Duma as Prime Minister. This was the first time ever that a PM was confirmed without any votes against.

Faction	Members	Yes	No	Abstained	Did not vote	Vacant
United Russia	341	326	0	0	15	
Communist Party	43	0	0	41	2	
Liberal Democratic Party	40	39	0	0	1	
A Just Russia	23	17	0	0	6	
Rodina	1	1	0	0	0	
Civic Platform	1	0	0	0	1	
All factions	449	383	0	41	25	1

=== Structure and composition ===
During a meeting with the Communist Party, Mishustin announced drastic changes in the structure and personal composition of the government.

Mikhail Mishustin, during the formation of the cabinet, held consultations with parliamentary parties. According to State Duma Speaker Vyacheslav Volodin, from members of the previous cabinet, all factions expressed support for the power and international blocs, three Deputy Prime Ministers: Tatyana Golikova, Dmitry Kozak and Alexey Gordeyev, as well as Agriculture Minister Dmitry Patrushev.

According to Volodin, the MPs spoke critically about four Ministers from previous cabinet: the Education Minister Olga Vasilieva, the Culture Minister Vladimir Medinsky, the Health Minister Veronika Skvortsova and the Labour and Social Affairs Minister Maxim Topilin. The Liberal Democratic Party also criticized Yury Trutnev, the Deputy Prime Minister and Presidential Envoy to the Far Eastern Federal District. However, other MPs on the contrary spoke positively about Trutnev.

On 21 January, Mikhail Mishustin presented to President Vladimir Putin a draft structure of the Cabinet. On the same day, the President signed a decree on the structure of the Cabinet and appointed the proposed Ministers. According to the decree, the Prime Minister will have 9 deputies, and the Ministry for North Caucasus Affairs will be abolished.

On 28 January 2020, Mikhail Mishustin approved the distribution of responsibilities among Deputy Prime Ministers.

On 26 March 2020, Mishustin proposed to restore the Government's Presidium, a body in the structure of the Cabinet formed to solve operational issues. Previously, such a body existed in the first Government of Medvedev, but in the second Government of Medvedev there was no Presidium. On 29 March, the Presidium was formed.

== Subsequent changes ==
=== Reshuffle due to COVID-19 ===
Reshuffle in the Cabinet caused by the detection of disease in government members. It is assumed that all changes temporary and infected members of the government will return to the exercise of their powers after recovery.

- On 30 April 2020, Prime Minister Mikhail Mishustin tested positive for COVID-19 and was hospitalised, Andrey Belousov was appointed the Acting Prime Minister. On 19 May, Mishustin returned to the exercise of his powers.
- On 1 May 2020, Construction Minister Vladimir Yakushev tested positive for COVID-19 and was hospitalised, Nikita Stasishin was appointed the Acting Minister. On 26 May Yakushev recovered and returned to the exercise of his powers.
- On 6 May 2020, Culture Minister Olga Lyubimova tested positive for COVID-19, Sergey Obryvalin was appointed the Acting Minister. Since the disease was mild, on 14 May Lyubimova recovered and returned to the exercise of her powers.

=== November 2020 reshuffle ===
In November 2020, there was a reshuffle in the government. In particular, three Ministers left the government, and two others changed their portfolios. In addition, a new position of Deputy Prime Minister was created. Since the reshuffle took place after the adoption of amendments to the Constitution and the new law on government, all appointments must be approved by the State Duma.

- Yevgeny Dietrich, Minister of Transport, left government. Vitaly Savelyev has been nominated as a new Minister. He was approved on 10 November with 274 votes in favor.
- Dmitry Kobylkin, Minister of Natural Resources and Ecology, left government. Alexander Kozlov has been nominated as a new Minister. He was approved on 10 November with 273 votes in favor.
- Alexander Kozlov, Minister for Development of the Russian Far East and Arctic, nominated as new Minister of Natural Resources and Ecology. Aleksey Chekunkov has been nominated as a new Minister. He was approved on 10 November with 324 votes in favor.
- Vladimir Yakushev, Minister for Construction and Housing, left government. Irek Faizullin has been nominated as a new Minister. He was approved on 10 November with 328 votes in favor.
- Alexander Novak, Minister of Energy, nominated as new Deputy Prime Minister. Nikolay Shulginov has been nominated as a new Minister. He was approved on 10 November with 329 votes in favor.
- Alexander Novak approved as new Deputy Prime Minister on 10 November with 327 votes in favor.

=== Yevgeny Zinichev death ===
On 8 September 2021, the Minister of Emergency Situations Yevgeny Zinichev died. His first deputy Aleksandr Chupriyan became the acting minister. Since the Minister of Emergency Situations is one of the five presidential ministers, a new minister should be appointed by the President of Russia after consultations with the Federation Council.

On 23 May 2022, President Vladimir Putin nominated Aleksandr Kurenkov for the post of new minister. On 25 May 2022, the Federation Council approved Kurenkov's candidacy with 159 votes in favor, and on the same day he was appointed minister by presidential decree.

=== July 2022 reshuffle ===
On 12 July 2022, President Vladimir Putin by his decree introduced a new post of Deputy Prime Minister and combining it with the post of Minister of Industry and Trade. On the same day, Mikhail Mishustin nominated Denis Manturov, the current Minister of Industry and Trade, for the post of Deputy Prime Minister.

Denis Manturov was approved by the State Duma on 15 July with 394 votes in favor. On the same day, he was appointed to the post of Deputy Prime Minister by presidential decree. In addition, Yury Borisov, the Deputy Prime Minister who previously supervised the defense industry complex, left the government and one position of Deputy PM was abolished.

== Composition ==
Post	Image	Name	Party	Took office	Left office
Prime Minister		Mikhail Mishustin	Independent	16 January 2020	7 May 2024 (temporarily stepped down due to illness from 30 April to 19 May 2020)
Prime Minister		Andrey Belousov (acting)	Independent	30 April 2020	19 May 2020
Deputy Prime Ministers
First Deputy Prime Minister for Finance, Economy and National Projects		Andrey Belousov	Independent	21 January 2020	7 May 2024
Deputy Prime Minister – Chief of Staff of the Government		Dmitry Grigorenko	Independent	21 January 2020	7 May 2024
Deputy Prime Minister for Agro-Industrial Complex, Natural Resources and Ecology		Victoria Abramchenko	United Russia	21 January 2020	7 May 2024
Deputy Prime Minister for Construction and Regional Development		Marat Khusnullin	Independent	21 January 2020	7 May 2024
Deputy Prime Minister for Defense and Space Industry		Yury Borisov	Independent	21 January 2020	15 July 2022
Deputy Prime Minister for Eurasian Integration, cooperation with the CIS, BRICS, G20 and International Events		Alexey Overchuk	Independent	21 January 2020	7 May 2024
Deputy Prime Minister for Fuel–Energy Complex		Alexander Novak	United Russia	10 November 2020	7 May 2024
Deputy Prime Minister – Presidential Envoy to the Far Eastern Federal District		Yury Trutnev	United Russia	21 January 2020	7 May 2024
Deputy Prime Minister for Social Policy		Tatyana Golikova	United Russia	21 January 2020	7 May 2024
Deputy Prime Minister for Tourism, Sport, Culture and Communications		Dmitry Chernyshenko	Independent	21 January 2020	7 May 2024
Federal Ministers
Minister of Agriculture		Dmitry Patrushev	Independent	21 January 2020	7 May 2024
Minister for Construction and Housing		Vladimir Yakushev	United Russia	21 January 2020	9 November 2020 (temporarily step down due to illness from 1 to 26 May 2020)
Minister for Construction and Housing		Nikita Stasishin (acting)	Independent	1 May 2020	26 May 2020
Minister for Construction and Housing		Irek Faizullin	Independent	9 November 2020	10 November 2020
Minister for Construction and Housing		Irek Faizullin	Independent	10 November 2020	7 May 2024
Minister of Culture		Olga Lyubimova	Independent	21 January 2020	7 May 2024 (temporarily step down due to illness from 6 to 14 May 2020)
Minister of Culture		Sergey Obryvalin (acting)	Independent	6 May 2020	14 May 2020
Minister of Defence		Sergei Shoigu	United Russia	21 January 2020	7 May 2024
Minister for Development of the Russian Far East and Arctic		Alexander Kozlov	United Russia	21 January 2020	10 November 2020
Minister for Development of the Russian Far East and Arctic		Aleksey Chekunkov	Independent	10 November 2020	7 May 2024
Minister of Digital Development, Communications and Mass Media		Maxut Shadayev	Independent	21 January 2020	7 May 2024
Minister of Economic Development		Maxim Reshetnikov	United Russia	21 January 2020	7 May 2024
Minister of Education		Sergey Kravtsov	Independent	21 January 2020	7 May 2024
Minister of Emergency Situations		Yevgeny Zinichev	Independent	21 January 2020	8 September 2021 (died in office)
Minister of Emergency Situations		Aleksandr Chupriyan (acting)	Independent	8 September 2021	25 May 2022
Minister of Emergency Situations		Aleksandr Kurenkov	Independent	25 May 2022	7 May 2024
Minister of Energy		Alexander Novak	United Russia	21 January 2020	10 November 2020
Minister of Energy		Nikolay Shulginov	Independent	10 November 2020	7 May 2024
Minister of Finance		Anton Siluanov	United Russia	21 January 2020	7 May 2024
Minister of Foreign Affairs		Sergey Lavrov	United Russia	21 January 2020	7 May 2024
Minister of Health		Mikhail Murashko	Independent	21 January 2020	7 May 2024
Minister of Industry and Trade		Denis Manturov	United Russia	15 July 2022	7 May 2024
Minister of Internal Affairs		Vladimir Kolokoltsev	Independent	21 January 2020	7 May 2024
Minister of Justice		Konstantin Chuychenko	United Russia	21 January 2020	7 May 2024
Minister of Labour and Social Protection		Anton Kotyakov	Independent	21 January 2020	7 May 2024
Minister of Natural Resources and Ecology		Dmitry Kobylkin	United Russia	21 January 2020	9 November 2020
Minister of Natural Resources and Ecology		Svetlana Radchenko (acting)	Independent	9 November 2020	10 November 2020
Minister of Natural Resources and Ecology		Alexander Kozlov	United Russia	10 November 2020	7 May 2024
Minister of Science and Higher Education		Valery Falkov	United Russia	21 January 2020	7 May 2024
Minister of Sport		Oleg Matytsin	Independent	21 January 2020	7 May 2024
Minister of Transport		Yevgeny Dietrich	United Russia	21 January 2020	9 November 2020
Minister of Transport		Alexander Neradko (acting)	Independent	9 November 2020	10 November 2020
Minister of Transport		Vitaly Savelyev	United Russia	10 November 2020	7 May 2024

== Approval ratings ==
Polling firm	Fieldwork date	Sample size	Approve	Disapprove	No opinion	Net
Levada Centre	25–30 Sep 2020	1,605	51%	47%	2%	4%
Levada Centre	20–26 Aug 2020	1,601	50%	48%	2%	2%
WCIOM	15–21 Jun 2020	11,200	37.0%	26.9%	36.1%	10.1%
WCIOM	11–14 Jun 2020	11,200	36.6%	26.1%	37.3%	10.5%
WCIOM	1–7 Jun 2020	11,200	35.9%	27.9%	36.2%	8.0%
WCIOM	25–31 May 2020	11,200	36.2%	28.2%	35.6%	8.0%
WCIOM	18–25 May 2020	11,200	37.7%	27.2%	35.1%	10.5%
WCIOM	11–17 May 2020	11,200	36.5%	27.3%	36.2%	9.2%
WCIOM	4–10 May 2020	11,200	36.0%	26.6%	38.4%	10.4%
WCIOM	27 Apr–3 May 2020	11,200	38.4%	25.5%	36.1%	12.9%
WCIOM	20–26 Apr 2020	11,200	37.7%	25.0%	37.3%	12.7%
WCIOM	13–19 Apr 2020	11,200	38.9%	23.2%	37.9%	15.7%
Levada Centre	19–25 Mar 2020	1,624	48%	48%	4%	0%
Levada Centre	20–26 Feb 2020	1,614	50%	46%	4%	4%
