= Minister of Emergency Situations (Russia) =

Russian government minister

- министр по ликвидации последствий стихийных бедствий (Russian)
- Emblem of the Ministry of Emergency Situations

- Flag of the Ministry of Emergency Situations

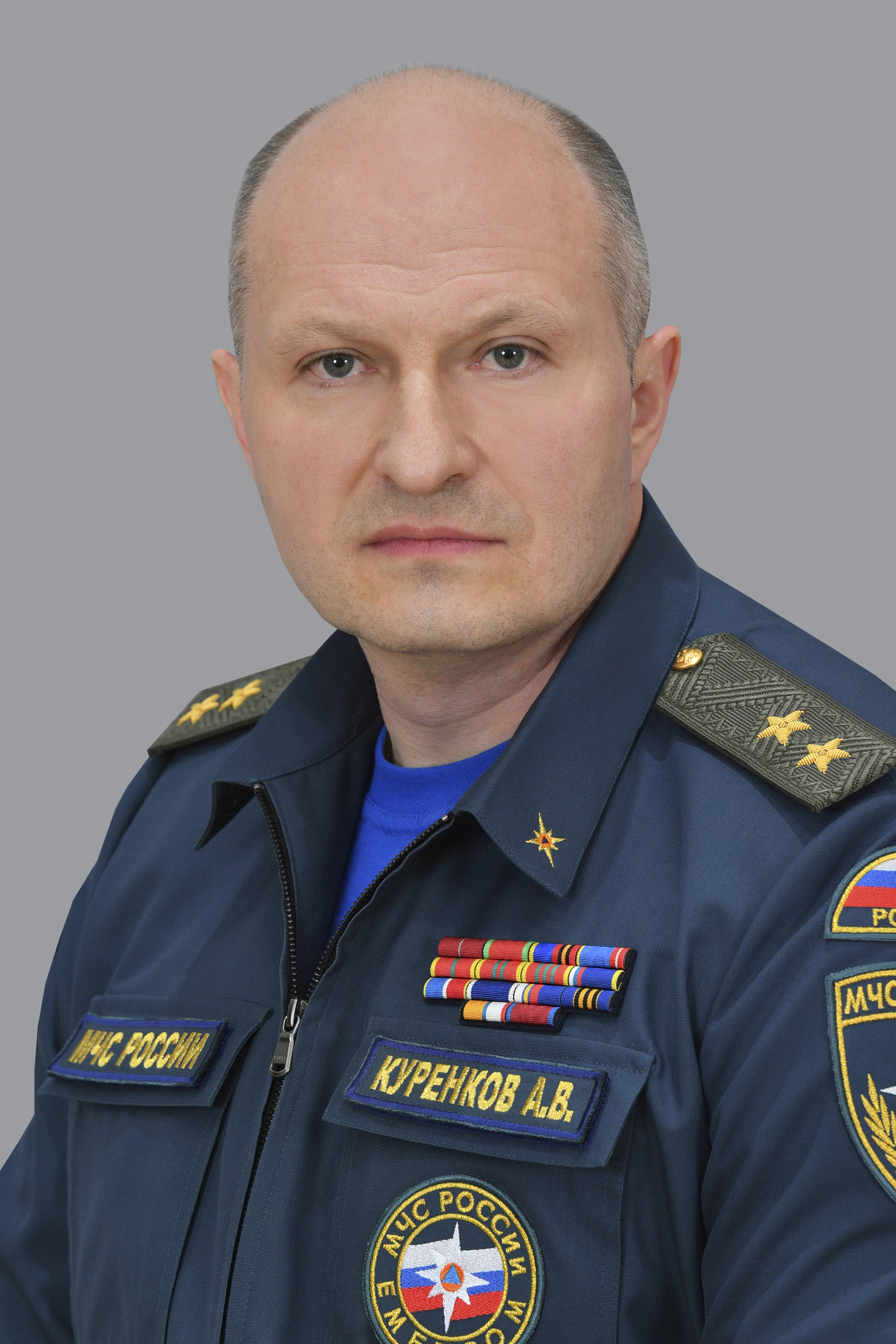
- Incumbent; Aleksandr Kurenkov since 25 May 2022
- Ministry of Emergency Situations
- Style: Mr. Minister
- Member of: Government
- Reports to: The president
- Seat: Moscow
- Appointer: The president (after consultation with the Federation Council)
- Term length: No fixed term
- Formation: 17 April 1991
- First holder: Sergei Shoigu
- Website: en.mchs.gov.ru

The Minister of the Russian Federation for Civil Defense, Emergency Situations and Elimination of the Consequences of Natural Disasters (Russian: Министр Российской Федерации по делам гражданской обороны, чрезвычайным ситуациям и ликвидации последствий стихийных бедствий, romanized: Ministr Rossiyskoy Federatsii po delam grazhdanskoy oborony, chrezvychaynym situatsiyam i likvidatsii posledstviy stikhiynykh bedstviy), also known as the Minister of Emergency Situations, is the head of the Russian Ministry of Emergency Situations. The minister of emergency situations is one of the five so-called 'presidential' ministers, along with the ministers of defense, interior, foreign affairs and justice. Although they are members of the Cabinet, they are directly subordinate to the president.

The minister of emergency situations, like other presidential ministers, is nominated and appointed by the president after consultation with the Federation Council (whereas non-presidential ministers are nominated by the prime minister and appointed by the president after approval by the State Duma). The current minister of emergency situations is Aleksandr Kurenkov

== Powers ==
According to the regulations of the Ministry of Emergency Situations, the Minister:

- bears personal responsibility for performance assigned to the Ministry of emergency situations of Russia of tasks and functions;
- distributes duties between his deputies;
- makes in the prescribed manner to the President of the Russian Federation and the Government of the Russian Federation draft regulatory legal acts and proposals on issues falling within the competence of EMERCOM of Russia;
- to approve the regulations on the subdivisions of the Central apparatus of EMERCOM of Russia;
- administered by the reception of citizens of the Russian Federation for military service in the rescue military units under contract for service in the Federal fire service in the EMERCOM of Russia; appoints and dismisses military personnel of rescue military units and the Federal fire service, persons of ordinary and commanding structure of Federal fire service, employees of the EMERCOM of Russia; dismissed from military service (services) military personnel of rescue military units and the Federal fire service, persons of ordinary and commanding structure of Federal fire service and employees of EMERCOM of Russia in accordance with the legislation of the Russian Federation, and also defines the respective powers of the officials of EMERCOM of Russia;
- establishes requirements for the level of education, profession and (or) the direction of training, to physical fitness:
  - persons applying for positions in the rescue military formations, rescue services, emergency rescue units, paramilitary mountain rescue parts;
  - persons applying for replacement of posts of ordinary and commanding structure in the Federal fire service, with the exception of persons applying for replacement of posts of the higher commanding structure;
- determines the order of the persons included in the Federal personnel reserve and personnel reserve of the Ministry of emergency situations of Russia;
- claims within established by the President of the Russian Federation number of employees the structure and staffing of the Central apparatus of EMERCOM of Russia;
- approves of EMERCOM of Russia within the limits of funds allocated from the Federal budget for the corresponding year of the EMERCOM of Russia;
- claims in the prescribed manner the statutes (regulations) of the organizations under the jurisdiction of EMERCOM of Russia, appoints and dismisses their managers, concludes and terminates their employment agreements (contracts), as well as in making agreements (contracts) change;
- organizes the work of EMERCOM of Russia, supervises the activities of the Federal fire service, the State Inspectorate for small vessels, rescue and other units and manages the rescue military formations;
- is of EMERCOM of Russia in the Executive, legislative and judicial authorities of the Russian Federation, in organizations and in international organizations;
- defines the list of officials of EMERCOM of Russia authorised to draw up protocols on administrative offences provided for by the Russian Code of administrative offences, and organize their activities;
- makes decisions on creation, reorganization and liquidation in the established order of territorial bodies and organizations under the jurisdiction of EMERCOM of Russia, determines their structure and staffing, sets standards of their authorized strength;
- is in the prescribed manner for the approval of the President of the Russian Federation concept and plan for the construction and development of rescue military units, proposals on their structure and composition, as well as the total number of military personnel of rescue military units;
- decides, in accordance with the legislation of the Russian Federation the questions connected with passage of Federal public service of EMERCOM of Russia;
- uses the full range of rights provided by charters of Armed Forces of the Russian Federation, to military personnel of rescue military units and Federal fire services, and rights provided for by the regulations on service in bodies of internal Affairs of the Russian Federation approved by the Decree of the Supreme Soviet of the Russian Federation dated 23 December 1992 4202-1 N "About the Position statement about service in bodies of internal Affairs of the Russian Federation and the text of the Oath of the employee of internal Affairs bodies of the Russian Federation", - in respect of persons of ordinary and commanding structure of Federal fire service;
- assigns military personnel of rescue military units and Federal fire service military ranks up to Colonel (captain 1st rank), inclusive, persons of ordinary and commanding structure of Federal fire-fighting service - special ranks up to Colonel of internal service inclusive; defines the powers of the officials of EMERCOM of Russia on assignment of military personnel of rescue military units and Federal fire service military ranks up to Colonel (captain 2nd rank), inclusive, to persons of commanding structure of Federal fire-fighting service - special ranks up to Colonel of internal service inclusive;
- submits for consideration the President of the Russian Federation proposals:
  - the inclusion of military positions military personnel of rescue military units and posts of the higher commanding personnel of the Federal fire service in the lists of military positions and positions of higher officers of the replaced senior officers and persons of the higher commanding structure;
  - on appointment to positions and release from positions, which are subject to replacement by persons of higher officers of the Federal fire service, and the appointment to military positions and exemption from military posts which are subject to substitution by higher officers rescue military formations;
  - about assignment of special ranks of the higher commanding structure to employees of the Federal fire service and military ranks of senior officers to the military personnel of rescue military units;
  - on the extension of the period of service of employees of the Federal fire service occupying positions of the Supreme command staff and military personnel of rescue military units occupying positions of senior officers who have reached of age limit of stay on service;
  - on the appointment of the acting in vacant posts, subject to replacement of the higher officers of rescue military units, up to six months;
  - on approval of the list of typical posts in the rescue military formations and typical positions in the Federal fire service, as well as corresponding military ranks;
- informs the President of the Russian Federation on imposing disciplinary sanctions on employees of the Federal fire service and the military personnel of rescue military units occupying positions, appointment to which and release from which are performed by the President of the Russian Federation, and also on the staff of the Federal fire service, acting in vacant posts, subject to replacement by persons of the higher commanding structure;
- has in the prescribed manner, award and gift funds, including firearms and bladed weapons, to reward military personnel of rescue military formations, personnel of the Federal fire service, employees of the EMERCOM of Russia, and also other persons assisting in carrying out of EMERCOM of Russia of problems;
- accepts in agreement with the Ministry of defence of the Russian Federation, Executive authorities of constituent entities of the Russian Federation and bodies of local self-government decision on relocation to the Russian Federation rescue military formations;
- is the military personnel of rescue military units and personnel of the Federal fire service, employees of the EMERCOM of Russia the state awards of the Russian Federation, Honorary diploma of the President of the Russian Federation, as well as promotion in the form of their gratitude of the President of the Russian Federation;
- decides the limits of its competence the issues of providing legal and social protection of the military rescue military formations, personnel of the Federal fire service, employees of the Ministry of emergency situations of Russia, bodies, departments and organizations of EMERCOM of Russia and members of their families, concluded in the established procedure in the sectoral wage rate agreement in the capacity of employer;
- directs in the prescribed manner the military personnel of rescue military units, the personnel of the Federal fire service and employees of EMERCOM of Russia on official business, including outside the Russian Federation;
- determines in accordance with established procedure departmental awards, approves regulations about the signs and their descriptions, awards them to the personnel of the EMERCOM of Russia, as well as citizens who assisted in the task of civil defence, protection of population and territories from emergencies, ensuring fire safety;
- claims in the prescribed manner a description of the form of clothes, footwear and means of special protection, the rate supply of special clothing and equipment, including temporary, procedure for ensuring the storage property of certain categories of public servants and persons holding positions unrelated to positions in the civil service, the military personnel of rescue military units and the Federal fire service, persons of ordinary and commanding structure of Federal fire service;
- claims in the prescribed manner to the General plans of construction and development of military camps and rescue military formations, towns, rescue units, towns of paramilitary mine rescue units, towns of rescue forces and infrastructure of the State Inspectorate for small vessels, projects of objects of own construction rescue military formations, plans for research and development work in the field of civil defense, prevention and liquidation of emergency situations, ensuring fire safety, overcoming the consequences of radiation accidents and catastrophes;
- issues within its competence in accordance with the established procedure regulatory legal acts, obligatory for execution by Federal Executive authorities, Executive authorities of constituent entities of the Russian Federation, bodies of local self-government, organizations regardless form of ownership, officials and citizens of the Russian Federation, foreign citizens and persons without citizenship, according to the standards and norms related to the competence of EMERCOM of Russia;
- argues nomenclature special equipment and material means, in respect of which the Ministry of emergency measures of Russia carries out functions of the state customer for the placement of orders, conclusion, payment, control and accounting of execution of state contracts under the state defense order;
- establishes taking into account the peculiarities of the EMERCOM of Russia atypical positions corresponding in status to the standard positions of the Federal fire service and typical posts of the rescue military formations;
- claims within its competence in the established order lists of military posts in the rescue military formations and posts of ordinary and commanding structure in the Federal fire service, as well as corresponding military ranks on the basis of duly approved lists of typical posts in the rescue military formations and in the Federal fire service;
- claims model structure, staffing, staffing, and ratios of security personnel and fire equipment divisions of the Federal fire service, sets the standards for staff number of management bodies and divisions of Federal fire service;
- defines the procedure and terms of conclusion of contracts on service of persons of ordinary and commanding structure of Federal fire service, the appointments of these persons on the post for the contest;
- prokomentiroval military personnel of rescue military units and the Federal fire service, persons of ordinary and commanding structure of Federal fire service for public authorities and organizations in order and on conditions established by the legislation of the Russian Federation;
- makes in the prescribed manner to the President of the Russian Federation proposals on the approval of the official symbols of EMERCOM of Russia, defines the list of administered by EMERCOM of Russia and organizations that are awarded banners, order delivery, storage, maintenance and use of these banners, approves the drawings and descriptions of forms of certificates of the President of the Russian Federation to the banners, the insignia of the military personnel of rescue military units and the Federal fire service, persons of ordinary and commanding structure of Federal fire service, and descriptions of these insignia;
- establishes categories of servicemen, passing military service under the contract in the EMERCOM of Russia, employees of the Federal fire service, Federal state civil servants and employees of EMERCOM of Russia with the right to food security in the period of military duty, participation in field exercises, emergency rescue and other urgent works spent in business trips on the territories of foreign States for the elimination of consequences of natural disasters and emergencies, regulations and order their food supply;
- appoints and dismisses in accordance with established procedure of the heads of regional centers of the bodies specially authorized to solve problems of civil defence tasks on prevention and liquidation of emergency situations, as well as the main state inspectors of subjects of the Russian Federation on fire supervision;
- appoints members of the Federal fire service acting in vacant posts, subject to replacement by persons of higher officers, for up to six months in a calendar year;
- informs the President of Russia on the appointment of employees of the Federal fire service acting in vacant posts, subject to replacement by persons of the higher commanding structure;
- appoint persons of ordinary and commanding structure of Federal fire service for the positions in the system of EMERCOM of Russia related to the support of the Federal fire service, maintaining previously established for this category of persons benefits and guarantees, including pensions in accordance with the Law of the Russian Federation dated 12 February 1993 N 4468-1 "On pension provision of persons held military service, service in internal Affairs bodies, State fire service, bodies for control over turnover of narcotic means and psychotropic substances, establishments and bodies criminally-Executive system, and their families";
- establishes salaries for non-standard military positions of servicemen, positions of employees of the Federal fire service in respect of salaries on typical military posts of military personnel and typical positions of employees of the Federal fire service;
- making to the Ministry of Finance proposals on forming the Federal budget for corresponding year;
- performs other duties in accordance with the legislation of the Russian Federation.

== List of ministers ==
No.	Portrait	Name (born–died)	Term of office			Political party	Government
No.	Portrait	Name (born–died)	Took office	Left office	Time in office	Political party	Government
–		Sergei Shoigu (born 1955)	17 April 1991 (Note: As Russian Rescue Corps commander.); 5 August 1991 (Note: As Chairman of the State Committee for Emergency Situations.)	20 January 1994	21 years, 24 days	Communist Party of the Soviet Union	Silayev I–II; Yeltsin & Gaidar; Chernomyrdin I
–		Sergei Shoigu (born 1955)	17 April 1991; 5 August 1991	20 January 1994	21 years, 24 days	Independent	Silayev I–II; Yeltsin & Gaidar; Chernomyrdin I
1		Sergei Shoigu (born 1955)	20 January 1994	11 May 2012	21 years, 24 days	Our Home – Russia	Chernomyrdin I–II; Kiriyenko; Primakov; Stepashin; Putin I; Kasyanov; Fradkov I–II; Zubkov; Putin II
1		Sergei Shoigu (born 1955)	20 January 1994	11 May 2012	21 years, 24 days	Unity	Chernomyrdin I–II; Kiriyenko; Primakov; Stepashin; Putin I; Kasyanov; Fradkov I–II; Zubkov; Putin II
1		Sergei Shoigu (born 1955)	20 January 1994	11 May 2012	21 years, 24 days	United Russia	Chernomyrdin I–II; Kiriyenko; Primakov; Stepashin; Putin I; Kasyanov; Fradkov I–II; Zubkov; Putin II
–		Ruslan Tsalikov (born 1956) acting	11 May 2012	17 May 2012	6 days	United Russia	Medvedev I
2		Vladimir Puchkov (born 1959)	17 May 2012	18 May 2018	6 years, 1 day	Independent	Medvedev I
3		Yevgeny Zinichev (1966–2021)	18 May 2018	8 September 2021 (Died in office)	3 years, 113 days	Independent	Medvedev II; Mishustin I
–		Aleksandr Chupriyan (born 1958) acting	8 September 2021	25 May 2022	259 days	Independent	Mishustin I
4		Aleksandr Kurenkov (born 1972)	25 May 2022	Incumbent	4 years, 105 days	Independent	Mishustin I–II
