= Aleksandr Kurenkov =

Russian politician and minister (born 1972)

- Александр Куренков
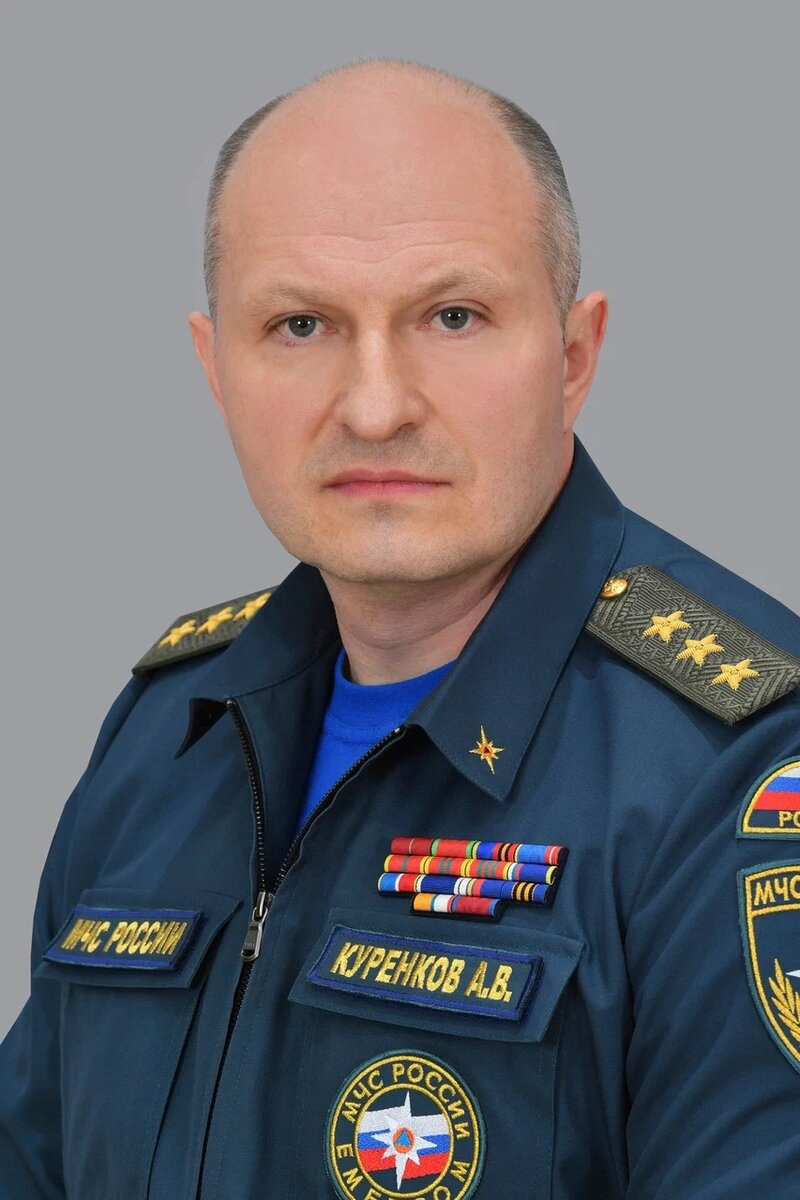
- Official portrait as Minister of Emergency Situations

Minister of Emergency Situations
- Incumbent
- Assumed office 25 May 2022
- President: Vladimir Putin
- Prime Minister: Mikhail Mishustin
- Preceded by: Aleksandr Chupriyan (acting); Yevgeny Zinichev

Personal details
- Born: 2 June 1972 (age 54) Moscow Oblast, Russian SFSR, USSR
- Party: Independent
- Education: Moscow State Academy of Physical Culture; Moscow Psychological-Social Institute; Military Academy of the General Staff of the Armed Forces of Russia
- Awards: Medal of the Order "For Merit to the Fatherland" Second Class

Military service
- Allegiance: Soviet Union (until 1991); Russia (since 1991)
- Branch/service: Federal Security Service; Federal Protective Service; National Guard Forces Command; EMERCOM
- Years of service: 1999–present
- Rank: Colonel General

Aleksandr Vyacheslavovich Kurenkov (Russian: Александр Вячеславович Куренков; born 2 June 1972) is a Russian politician and military officer. He has served as the Minister of Emergency Situations since May 2022, and holds the rank of lieutenant general.

== Early career ==
Kurenkov was born in Moscow Oblast, in what was then the Russian Soviet Federative Socialist Republic, in the Soviet Union, on 2 June 1972. In 1995, he began work as a teacher of physical culture at school No. 312 in Moscow, while also studying at the Moscow State Academy of Physical Culture, graduating in 1998. In 1999, he left his teaching job to join the Federal Security Service, where he worked in various positions until 2002, when he joined the Federal Protective Service. In 2004, he graduated from the Moscow Psychological-Social Institute. While working as a Federal Protective Service officer, Kurenkov was part of the protective detail of then Prime Minister Viktor Zubkov between 2007 and 2008, with Zubkov then becoming first deputy chairman in the Putin government. Sources in the Ministry of Emergency Situations described Kurenkov as having become a "Putin adjutant" around 2015.

In 2021, Kurenkov became assistant director, and the following year, deputy director, of the National Guard Forces Command, serving under Viktor Zolotov. He supervised the department of combat training. Sources in the Ministry of Emergency Situations suggest that in this capacity Kurenkov participated in the 2022 Russian invasion of Ukraine.

== Ministerial post ==
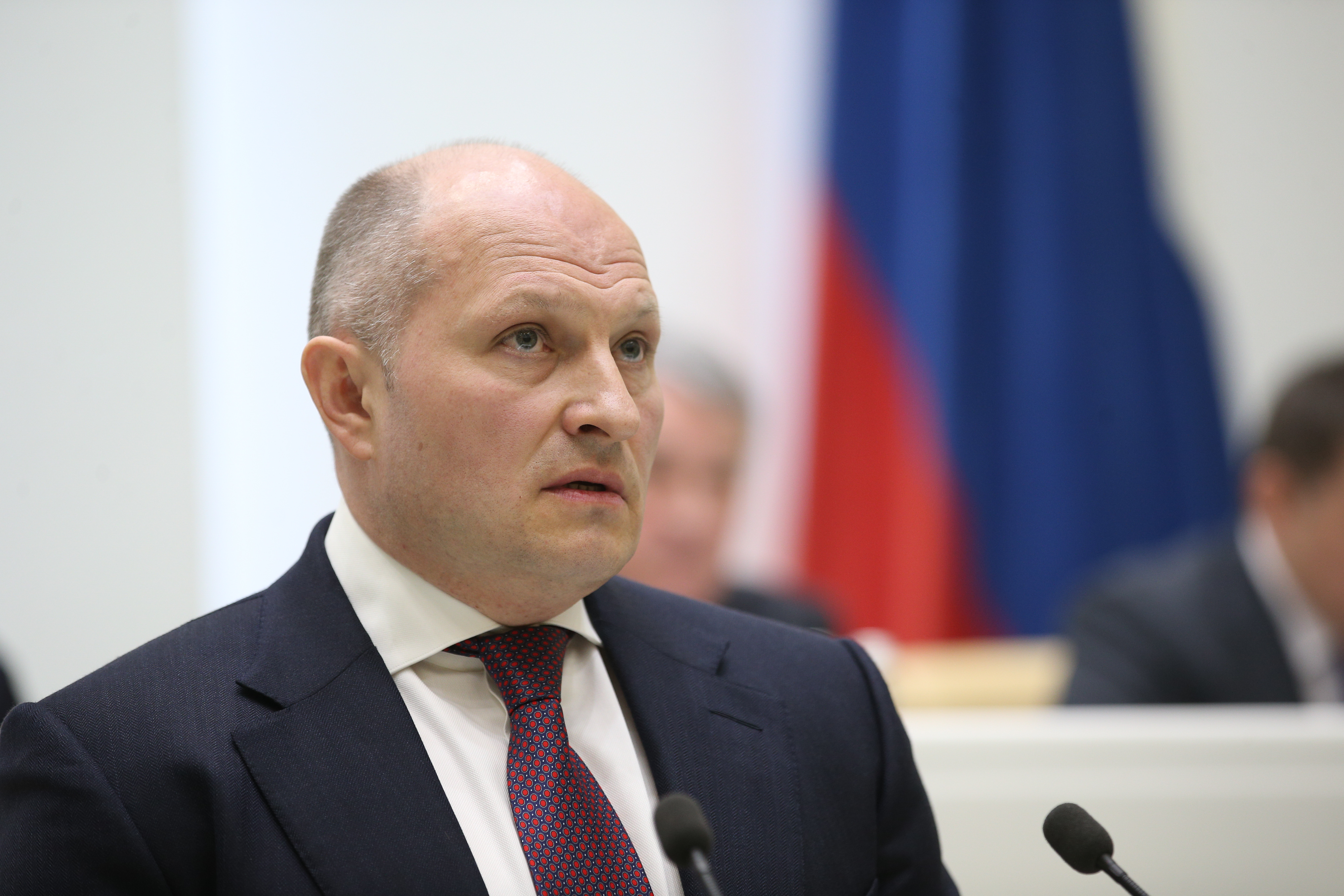
Kurenkov at his confirmation hearing on 25 May 2022

On 23 May 2022, President of Russia Vladimir Putin nominated Kurenkov as the new Minister of Emergency Situations. The post had been held by the former deputy minister, Aleksandr Chupriyan, in an acting capacity, since the death of the previous minister, Yevgeny Zinichev, in September 2021. Kremlin spokesman Dmitry Peskov noted that "Putin personally knows Kurenkov well. And the choice means that, according to the head of state, the personal, official, professional qualities of Kurenkov will make him best to perform these functions."

On 25 May 2022, after undergoing confirmation hearings by the Federation Council, and receiving unanimous support, Kurenkov was appointed Minister of Emergency Situations. As Minister of Emergency Situations, he became a member of the Security Council of Russia, to which he was appointed on 30 May 2022.

Kurenkov held the rank of major general from since around December 2021, having graduated from the Military Academy of the General Staff of the Armed Forces of Russia about this time. In 2015, he was awarded the Medal of the Order "For Merit to the Fatherland" Second Class. He was promoted to the rank of lieutenant general on 2 June 2022.

== Sanctions ==
In December 2022 the EU sanctioned Aleksandr Kurenkov in relation to the 2022 Russian invasion of Ukraine.
