= Ministry of Emergency Situations (Russia) =

Russian government agency overseeing civil emergency services

Ministry of Civil Defense, Emergencies and Disaster Relief of the Russian Federation
- Министерство Российской Федерации по делам гражданской обороны, чрезвычайным ситуациям и ликвидации последствий стихийных бедствий Ministerstvo Rossiiskoi Federatsii po delam grazhdanskoi oborony, chrezvychainym situatsiyam i likvidatsii posledstvii stikhiinykh bedstvii
- Ministry emblem

- Ministry digital emblem

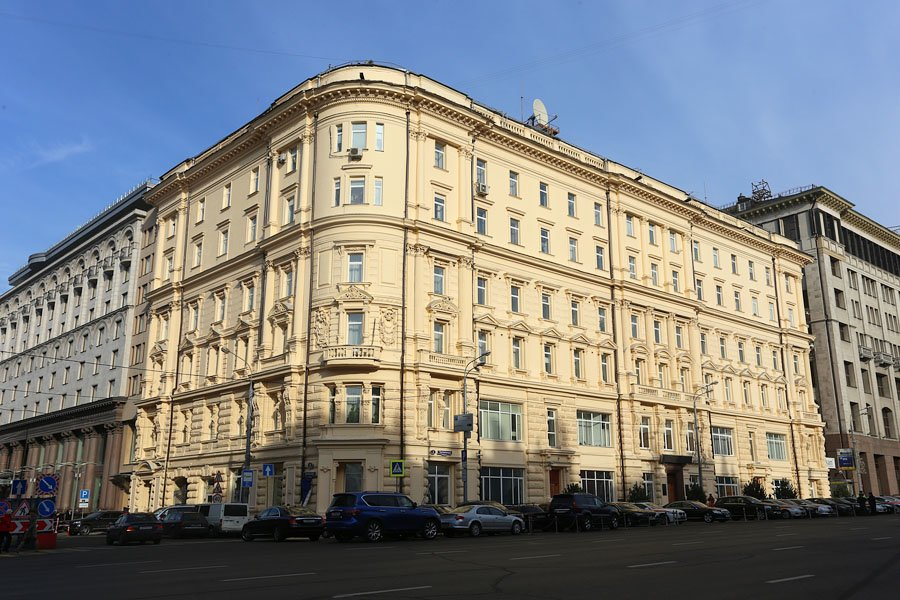
- Ministry headquarters in Moscow

Agency overview
- Formed: 27 December 1990
- Preceding agency: Russian Rescue Corps
- Jurisdiction: President of Russia
- Headquarters: Teatralny proyezd 3, Moscow; 55°45′34″N 37°37′18″E
- Minister responsible: Aleksandr Kurenkov, Minister of Emergency Situations
- Parent agency: Government of Russia
- Child agencies: Russian State Fire Service; GIMS (Main Inspection for Small Vessels)
- Website: en.mchs.gov.ru

Footnotes
- The official anthem and marchpast is Song of Restless Youth by Aleksandra Pakhmutova; Civil Defence Day (День войск гражданской обороны) is celebrated on 4 October.

The Ministry of Civil Defence, Emergencies and Disaster Relief (Note: Russian: Министерство Российской Федерации по делам гражданской обороны, чрезвычайным ситуациям и ликвидации последствий стихийных бедствий, romanized: Ministerstvo Rossiyskoy Federatsii po delam grazhdanskoy oborony, chrezvychaynym situatsiyam i likvidatsii posledstviy stikhiynykh bedstviy; also known as the Ministry of Emergency Situations (Министерство по чрезвычайным ситуациям; abbreviated MChS, МЧС России) or internationally as EMERCOM (derived from "Emergency Control Ministry")) is a Russian government agency overseeing the civil emergency services in Russia.

President Boris Yeltsin established EMERCOM on 10 January 1994, though the ministry can be traced back to 27 December 1990, when the Russian Soviet Federative Socialist Republic (RSFSR) established the Russian Rescue Corps (RRC) and assigned it the mission of rapid response to emergencies.

== History ==
The history of civil defence services in Russia traces to the years of Muscovy rule and the 1649 "Direction on Municipal rescue" decree of Tsar Alexis of Russia which officially raised the Moscow Municipal Fire Service, the first active fire department in Russia. When Peter the Great was Tsar, Saint Petersburg was given its own fire department modeled on Western practices of the time. By 1863 it was transformed, by orders of Tsar Alexander II of Russia, as the first ever professional fire service in Russia and Eastern Europe.

Starting in 1932, civil defence matters were performed by the Local Air Defence Units (Note: (Russian: Местная противовоздушная оборона PBO-C, Mestnaya protivovozdushnaya oborona PVO-S)) under the nascent Soviet Air Defence Forces, which were transferred to the NKVD in 1940 (and served with distinction, together with the NKVD Fire Services Command founded in 1918, in the Great Patriotic War). In 1960 it was returned to the Ministry of Defence as a service branch of the Soviet Armed Forces (the Civil Defence Forces of the Ministry of Defence) and a directly reporting agency, while the MVD retained the firefighting service.

In the aftermath of the events of the 1988 Armenian earthquake and the Chernobyl disaster, on 17 July 1990 a directive decision of the Presidium of the Supreme Council of Russian Socialist Soviet Republic led to the formation of the Russian Rescue Corps (Note: (Russian: Российский корпус спасателей)), which eventually was formed by the Soviet Government on 27 December 1990. This date is marked as the official anniversary of the EMERCOM.

On 17 April 1991 the Presidium of the Supreme Council of Russia appointed Sergei Shoigu as Chairman of the State Committee for Emergency Situations (Note: (Russian: Государственный Комитет по чрезвычайным ситуациям, ГКЧС)), which succeeded the RRC.

On 19 November 1991 the State Committee was merged with the Headquarters for Civil Defence of the USSR (under the Ministry of Defence) to create the State Committee of the Russian Federation for Civil Defence, Emergency Situations and Elimination of the Consequences of Natural Disasters (Note: (Russian: Государственный комитет по делам гражданской обороны, чрезвычайным ситуациям и ликвидации последствий стихийных бедствий при Президенте РСФСР)) and was subordinated to the President of Russia. Sergei Shoigu was appointed as a chairman by Boris Yeltsin.

On 10 January 1994 the State Committee became part of the Government of Russia and the ministry was named the Ministry of Civil Defence, Emergencies and Disaster Relief, with Sergei Shoigu as a minister.

On 1 January 2002, the Russian State Fire Service, the national fire service, became part of the ministry with 278,000 firefighters, removed from Ministry of Internal Affairs control after 84 years.

On 12 May 2012, Vladimir Puchkov was appointed as the new minister, replacing Shoigu who was later appointed as Defense Minister after a brief stint as Governor of Moscow Oblast.

On 1 July 2016, an EMERCOM firefighting Il-76 aircraft, after taking-off from the Irkutsk International Airport, had crashed near Lake Baikal during low-level water dumping as to help douse wildfires in Siberia.

On 28 March 2025, following the 2025 Myanmar earthquake, Russia sent EMERCOM teams to Myanmar to assist with the international disaster-relief and humanitarian operations in the region.

== Duties ==
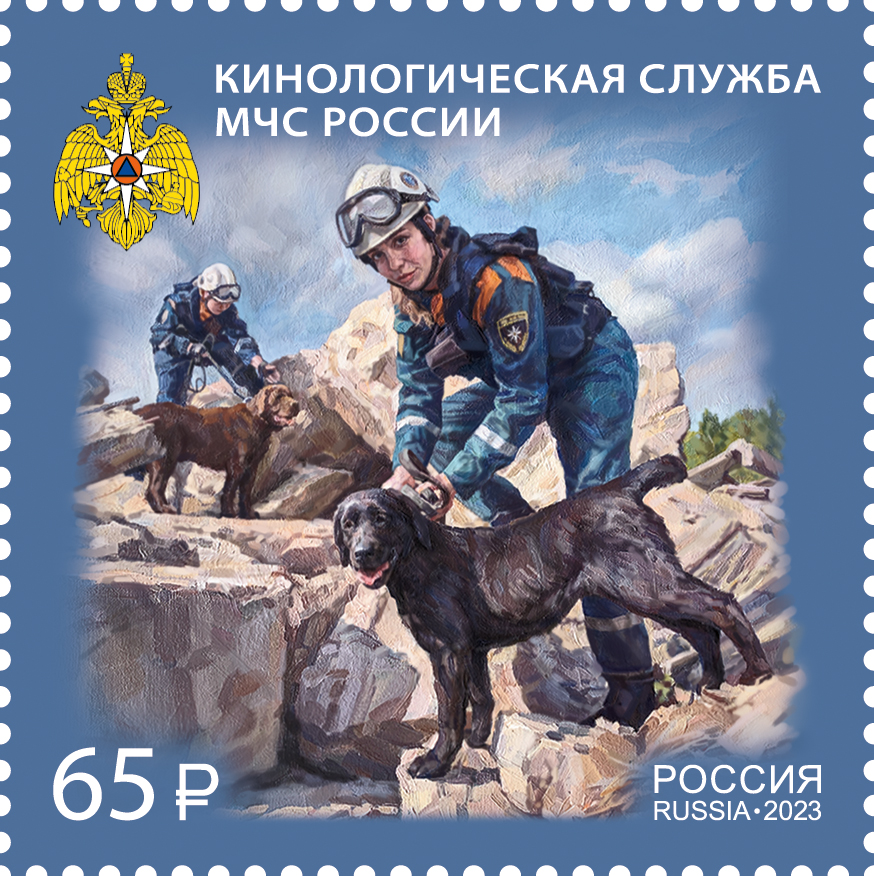
Russian Post stamp about EMERCOM

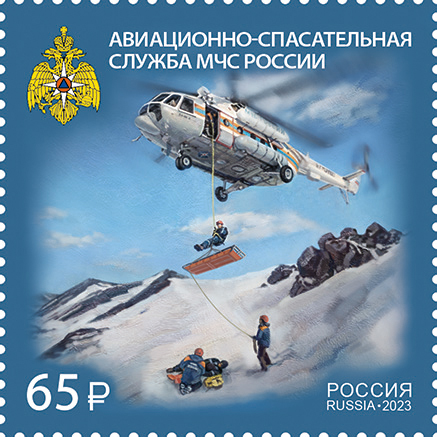
Russian Post stamp about EMERCOM

According to an EMERCOM publication, the Ministry is an agency of federal executive power with the following tasks:

- developing proposals and initiatives in the sphere of State policy on issues within the Ministry's competence;
- managing the civil defence and search and rescue Service in the Russian Federation;
- providing for the functioning and further development of the Russian System of Disaster Management (Russian: ОКСИОН OKSION};
- directing activities aimed at eliminating the consequences of large-scale disasters, catastrophes and other emergencies;
- conducting special submarine activities;
- supervising the use of finance resources allocated to the Government for disaster management and response;
- organizing the training of the population, and governing agencies and the RSDM forces for disaster management and response;
- and organizing international cooperation in the fields of the Ministry's competency.

== Ministers ==
=== Sergei Shoigu ===
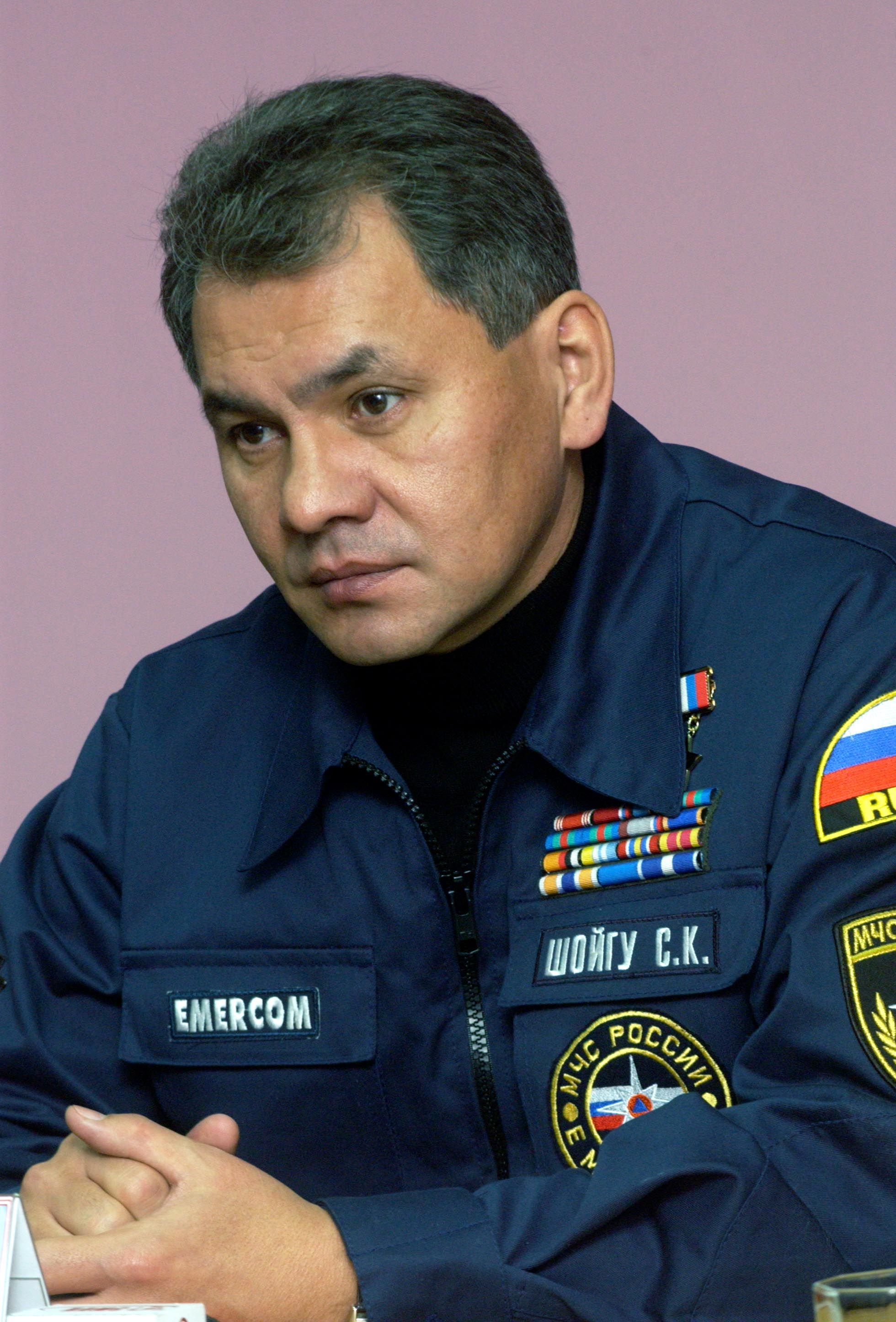
Sergei Shoigu was Minister from 1991 to 2012

The first Minister in charge of EMERCOM was Sergei Shoigu. He was appointed by the Presidium of the Supreme Council of Russia as Chairman of the State Committee for Emergency Situations on 17 April 1991, and by President Yeltsin on 19 November 1991 as Chairman of the State Committee of the Russian Federation for Civil Defense, Emergency Situations and Elimination of the Consequences of Natural Disasters.

On October 1994, Shoigu was given the rank of Major General, and his committee became a ministry on 10 January 1994, with him as the minister. President Yeltsin showed his faith in the importance of EMERCOM by designating Minister Sergey Shoigu a member of the Russian Security Council by Presidential Decree on 1 February 1994.

On 11 May 2012, Sergey Shoigu, after he resigned from his position as the Minister, was appointed as Governor of Moscow Oblast.

=== Vladimir Puchkov ===
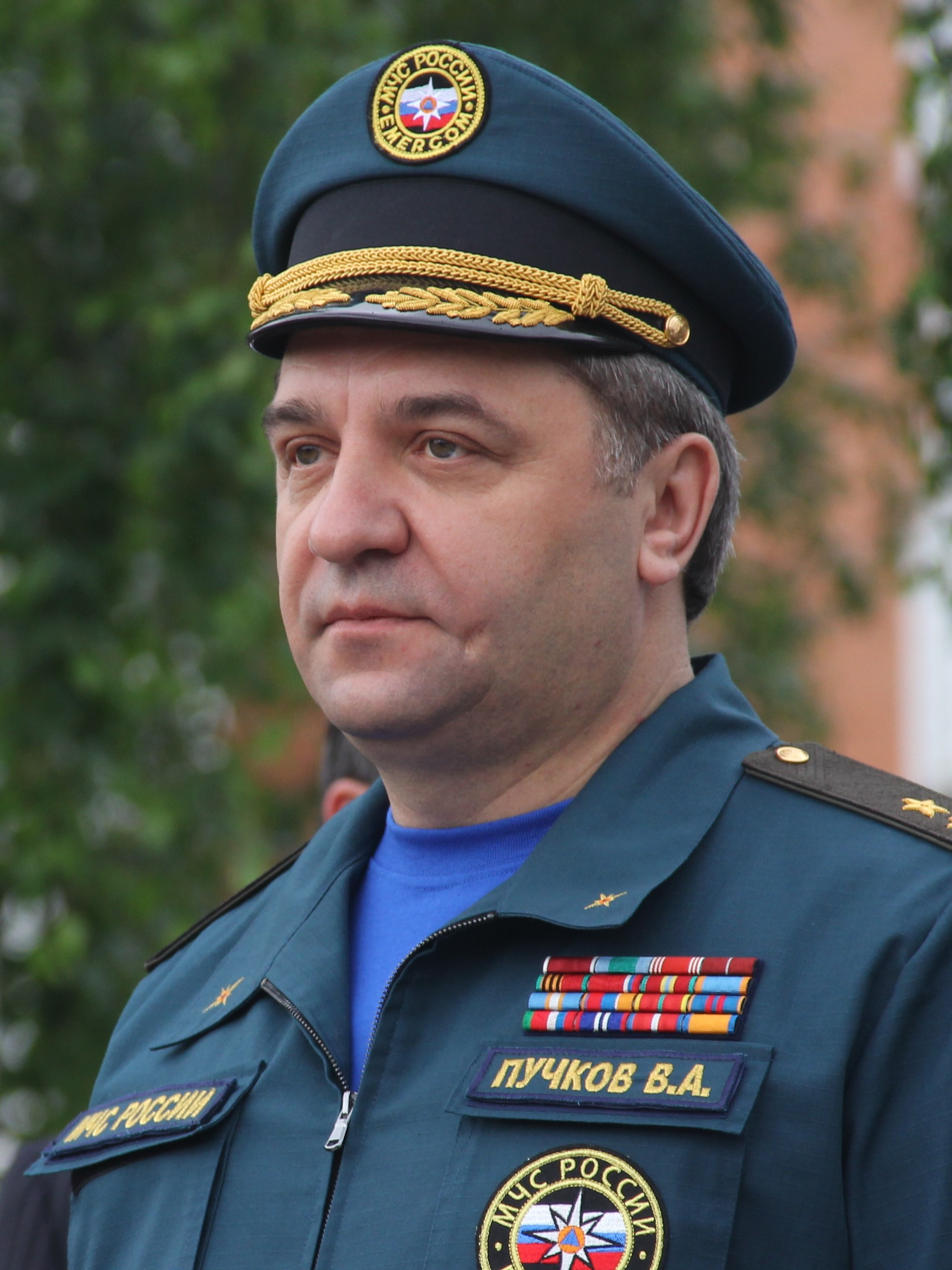
Vladimir Puchkov was Minister from 2012 to 2018

Vladimir Puchkov was the Deputy Minister of Emergencies. On 17 May 2012 he was appointed as Minister first government of Dmitry Medvedev. Six years later, when the new government was formed, he did not join the government.

=== Yevgeny Zinichev ===
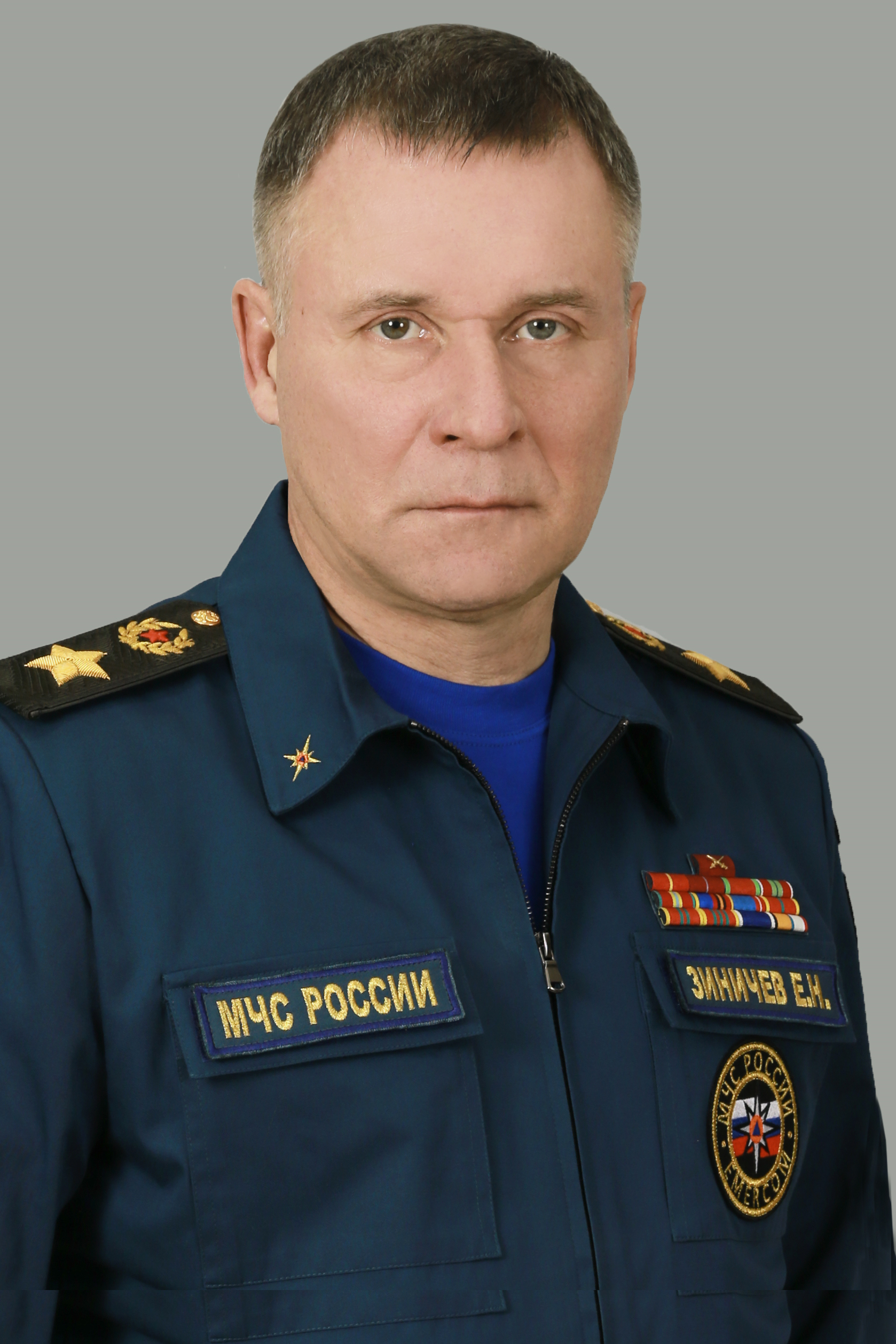
Yevgeny Zinichev was Minister from 2018 to 2021

Yevgeny Zinichev was appointed minister on 18 May 2018, in the second Medvedev government. Prior to appointment, Zinichev held the position of deputy director of the Federal Security Service (FSB), and was not a career lifeguard. He had served all his life in security agencies, with the other two being Soviet KGB, and the Federal Protective Service (FSO). After the resignation of the Second Medvedev cabinet in 2020, he retained his post in the new government of Mikhail Mishustin.

Yevgeny Zinichev died on 8 September 2021, aged 55, during the filming of an interdepartmental exercise to protect the Arctic zone of Russia. According to the ministry, he had fallen to his death while trying to save the life of director and cameraman Aleksandr Melnik, who had also deceased. His death was the first case in the history of post-Soviet Russia of the death of an incumbent federal minister.

=== Aleksandr Kurenkov ===
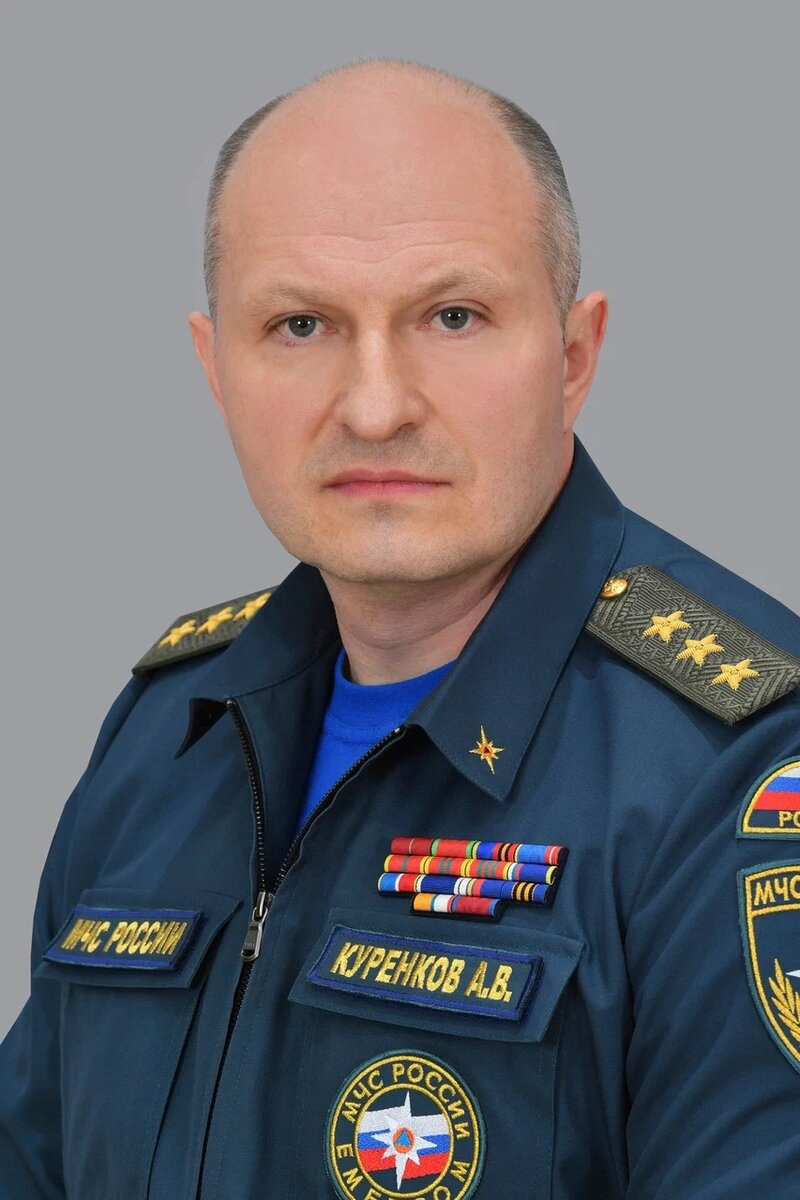
Alexander Kurenkov is Minister from 2022

Aleksandr Kurenkov was appointed minister on 25 May 2022.

== Departments ==
- Department for the Protection of the Population and Territories
- Department for Disaster Prevention
- Department of Forces
- Department for International Cooperation
- Department for the Elimination of Consequences of Radiological and other Disasters
- Department for Science and Technology
- Management Department

== Commissions and Boards ==
Small emblem

- Interagency Commission of the Russian Federation for Fighting Forest Fires
- Interagency Commission of the Russian Federation for Floods
- Interagency Maritime Coordinating Commission for Emergencies on the Seas and Water Basins
- Interagency Commission of the Russian Federation for the Certification of Rescuers

Working through the office of the Prime Minister, the Ministry can ask for private, Ministry of Defence or National Guard of Russia assistance. That is, the Ministry has international coordination power and the ability to tap local resources if required.

The Department of International Cooperation, to present an example of the activities of one of these departments and commissions, has already signed agreements on cooperation during disaster response and prevention with Germany, Italy, France, Switzerland, Poland, Belarus, Georgia, and Kazakhstan. Mutual assistance pacts are ready for signing with Mongolia, Latvia, Finland, Armenia, Moldova, Serbia and Estonia. An agreement also exists with the U.N. High Commission for Refugees (UNHCR), and agreements are sought with the OSCE and NATO.

== Internal organizations ==
- Regional Centres – EMERCOM centres are located in Moscow, St. Petersburg, Nizhny Novgorod, Rostov-on-Don, Samara, Yekaterinburg, Novosibirsk, Krasnoyarsk, Chita and Khabarovsk.
- Civil Defence and Emergency Headquarters – Many regions, provinces, autonomous administrative units, districts and towns possess these headquarters.
- Command and Control Center – These centers are located in Moscow, and in each region and oblast.
- Training and Education Facilities – These include the Civil Defense Academy, Training and Methodology centres, an All-Russia Scientific Research Institute, an All-Russian Monitoring and Laboratory Control Centre, and a Centre for Scientific Analysis of Civil Defence Issues.

To perform rapid response operations the following forces and equipment are available:

- Russian State Fire Service – The highest fire service body in Russia.
- Central Air-Mobile Rescue Team – These teams are equipped with aviation facilities that include helicopters and cargo aircraft (Ilyushin Il-76, Antonov An-72, An-148-100EM, Ka-32A11VS). The teams have taken part in United Nations' humanitarian delivery operations.
- Civil Defense Forces Command – These troops consist of military troop divisions and regiments/brigades stationed in various regions of the country aimed at civil defense measures during natural and man-made disasters.
- Civil Defense Academy of the Ministry of Emergency Situations – EMERCOM academy that trains all officers and non-commissioned personnel of the Ministry in the duties of civil defense.
- Search and Rescue Service – This service maintains 30 units in various republics, regions and provinces.

== Ranks ==
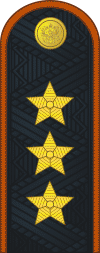
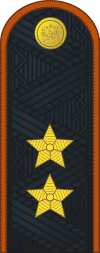
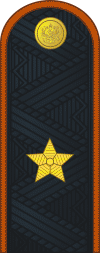
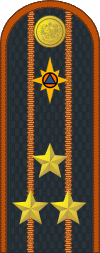
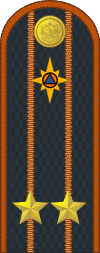
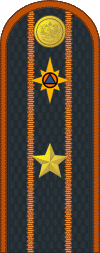
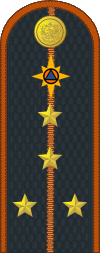
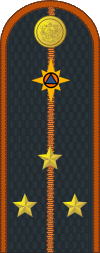
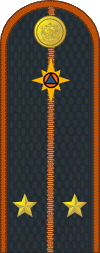
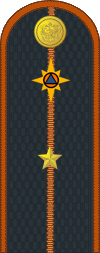
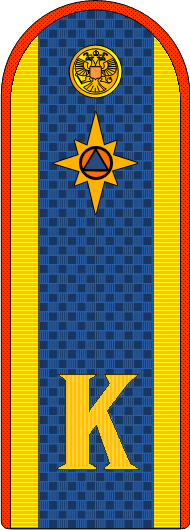
Rank group	General / flag officers			Senior officers			Junior officers
Ministry of Emergency Situations
Ministry of Emergency Situations	Генера́л-полко́вник; Generál-polkóvnik	Генера́л-лейтена́нт; Generál-leytenánt	Генера́л-майо́р; Generál-mayór	Полко́вник; Polkóvnik	Подполко́вник; Podpolkóvnik	Майо́р; Majór	Kапита́н; Kapitán	Старший лейтена́нт Stárshiy leytenánt	Лейтенант; Leytenant	Mла́дший лейтена́нт Mládshiy leytenánt	Курсант; Kursant

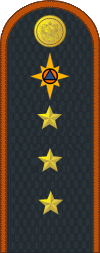
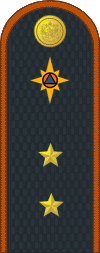
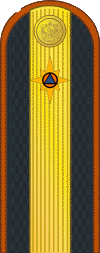
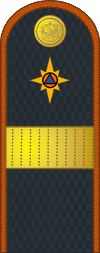
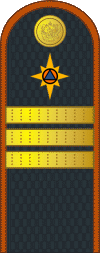
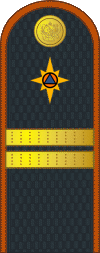
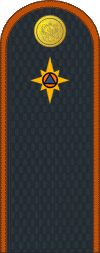
Rank group	Senior NCOs						Junior NCOs	Enlisted
Ministry of Emergency Situations
Ministry of Emergency Situations	Ста́рший пра́порщик Stárshiy práporshchik	Пра́порщик; Práporshchyk	Старшина́ Starshyná	Ста́рший сержа́нт Stárshiy serzhánt	Сержа́нт; Serzhánt	Мла́дший сержа́нт Mládshiy serzhánt		Рядово́й; Ryadovóy

== Equipment ==
=== Aircraft ===
List of active Ministry of Emergency Situations aircraft
Name	Image	Origin	Type	Variant	Active	Stored	Notes
Antonov An-2		Soviet Union	Transport aircraft			1	
Antonov An-3		Soviet Union	Transport aircraft	An-3T	2		
Yakovlev Yak-40		Soviet Union	Regional jet			1	
Yakovlev Yak-42		Soviet Union / Russia	Narrow-body jet airliner	Yak-42D		2	
Antonov An-74		Soviet Union	Transport aircraft	An-74P	2		
Antonov An-148		Ukraine / Russia	Regional jet	An-148-100E	2		
Sukhoi Superjet 100		Russia	Narrow-body jet airliner	Superjet 100-95LR	2		
Ilyushin Il-62		Soviet Union / Russia	Narrow-body jet airliner	Il-62M		1	
Tupolev Tu-154		Soviet Union	Narrow-body jet airliner	Tu-154M	1		
Ilyushin Il-76		Soviet Union / Russia	Strategic and tactical airlifter	Il-76TD	5		
Beriev Be-200		Russia	Multirole amphibious aircraft	Be-200ES	10	2	
Airbus Helicopters H145		European Union	Utility helicopter		3		
MBB Bo 105		Germany	Utility helicopter	Bo-105CBS-5	2		
MBB/Kawasaki BK 117		Germany / Japan	Utility helicopter	BK 117C-1	1		
Kazan Ansat		Russia	Utility helicopter		1		
Kamov Ka-32		Soviet Union / Russia	Utility helicopter	Ka-32A Ka-32T Ka-32A11BC	13		
Mil Mi-2		Soviet Union	Utility helicopter			1	
Mil Mi-8		Soviet Union	Transport helicopter	Mil Mi-8T	1		
Mil Mi-8M		Soviet Union / Russia	Transport helicopter	Mil Mi-8MT Mil Mi-8MTV-1 Mil Mi-8MTV-2	33	2	
Mil Mi-26		Soviet Union / Russia	Heavy lift transport helicopter	Mil Mi-26T	5	1	

=== Cars ===
Name	Type	Origin	Photo
GAZelle GAZ-2705	Utility Van	Russia	
PPU48-03 (Kamaz-43118 chassis)	Mobile control point	Russia	
AM-RHR	Chemical Reconnaissance Car	Russia	
ASM-41-022 (base UAZ-3909)	Rescue of general purpose	Russia	
MAVR-588560S	Rescue vehicle	Russia	
ASM-48-031 (Kamaz-43118 chassis)	Rescue vehicle	Russia	
Car for transportation department paramilitary mountain rescue units (Kamaz-4308 based)		Russia	
Petrovich-204-60	All-terrain vehicle	Russia	
ZiL-49061	Amphibious vehicle	Soviet Union	

=== Boats ===
Name	Type	Origin	Photo
Mars-700	Hovercraft	Russia	
Mars-2000	Hovercraft	Russia	
Khivus-6	Hovercraft	Russia	
Mongoose (project 12150M)	Airboat	Russia	
PK-500	Patrol boat	Russia	
RPK-640	Patrol boat	Russia	
Kasatka-2M	Patrol boat	Russia	

== Gallery ==
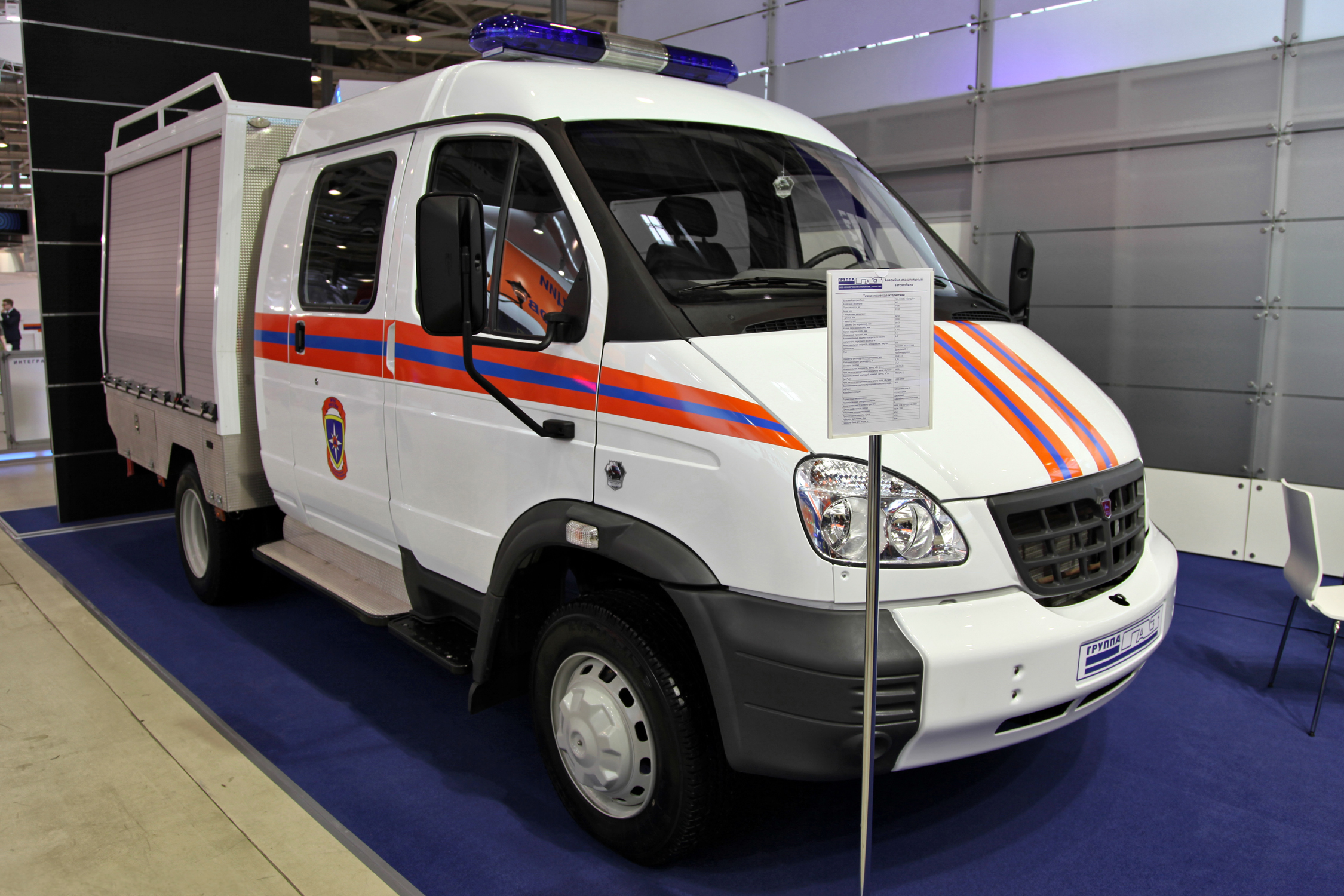
EMERCOM GAZ Valdai three door extended cab

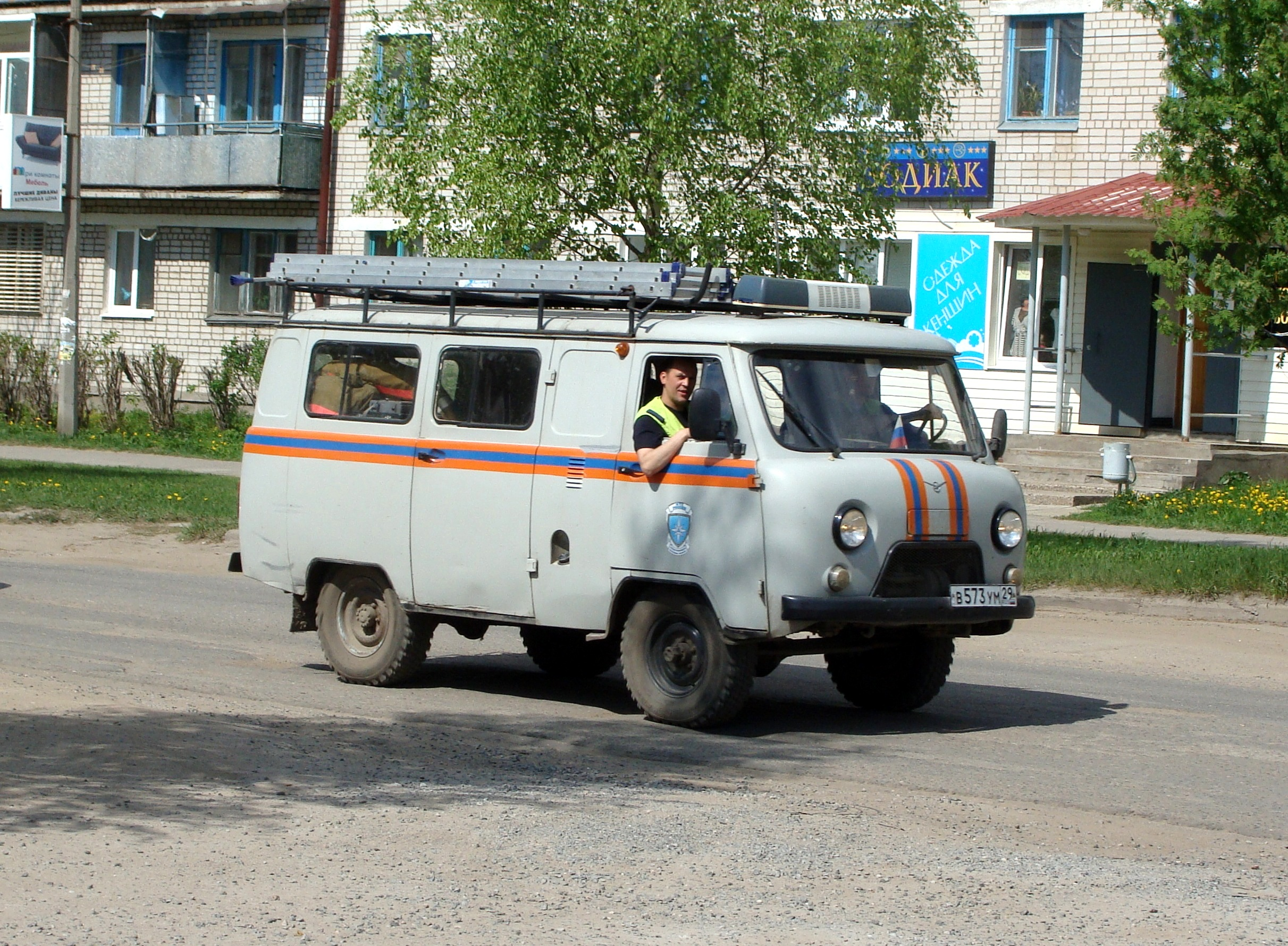
Emergency service vehicle on the basis of all-wheel drive minivan UAZ-2206

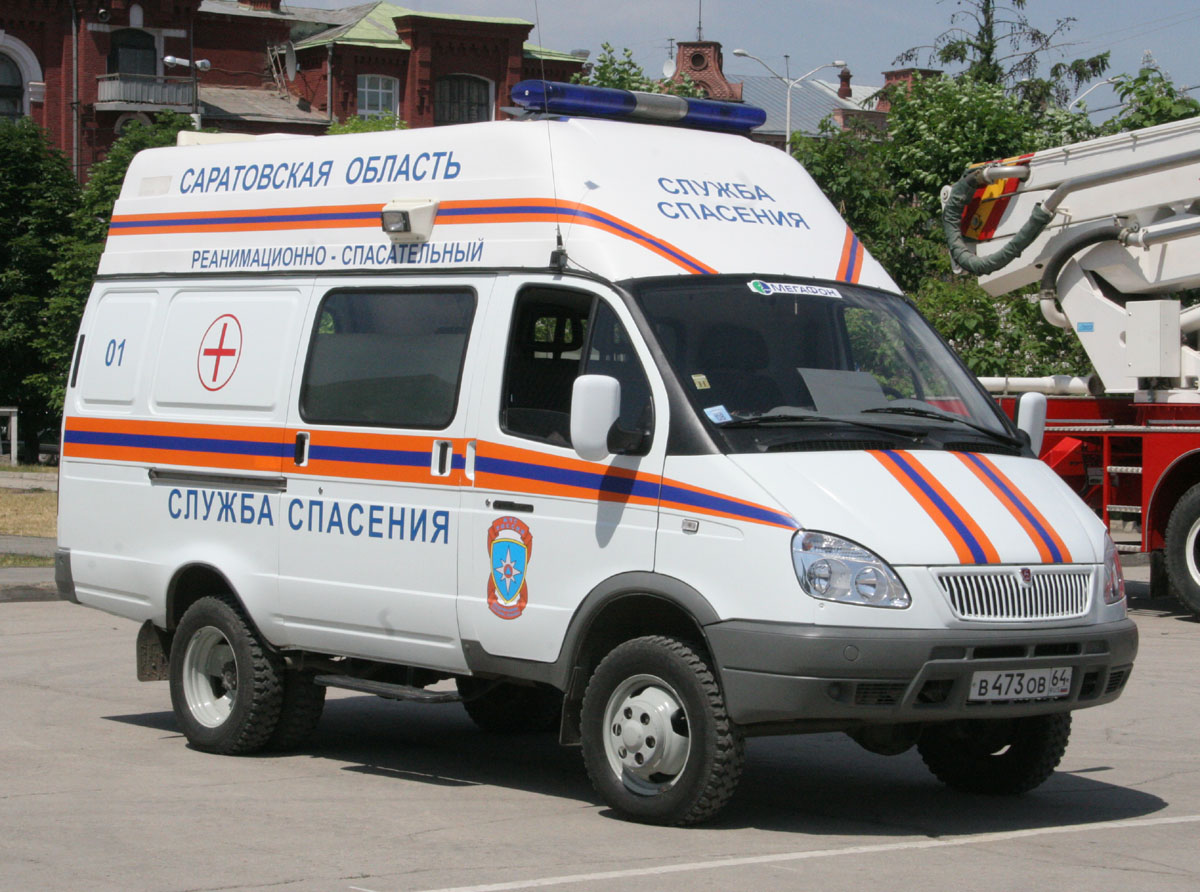
Emergency service vehicle on the basis of minivan GAZelle

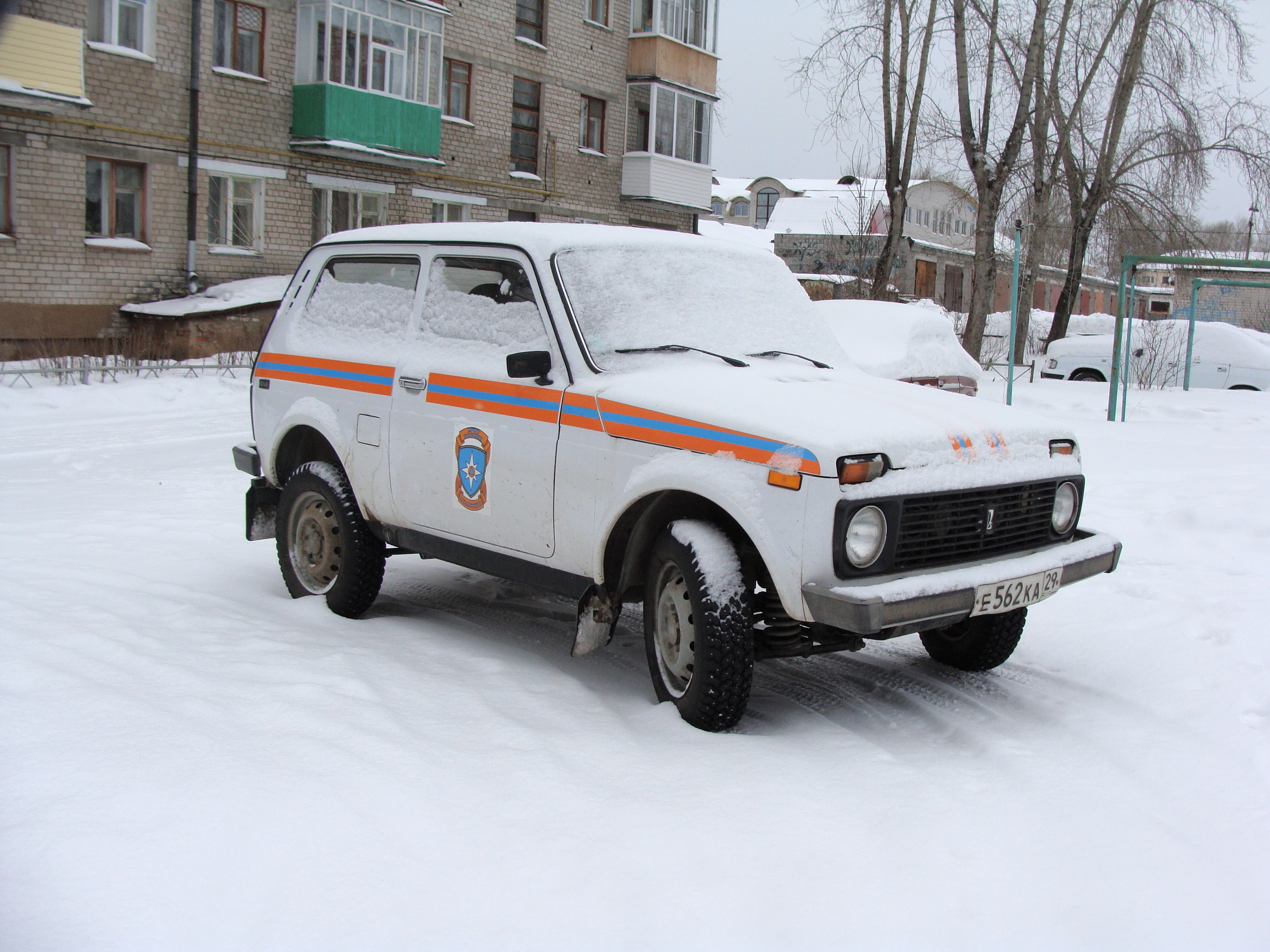
SUV VAZ-2121 Niva

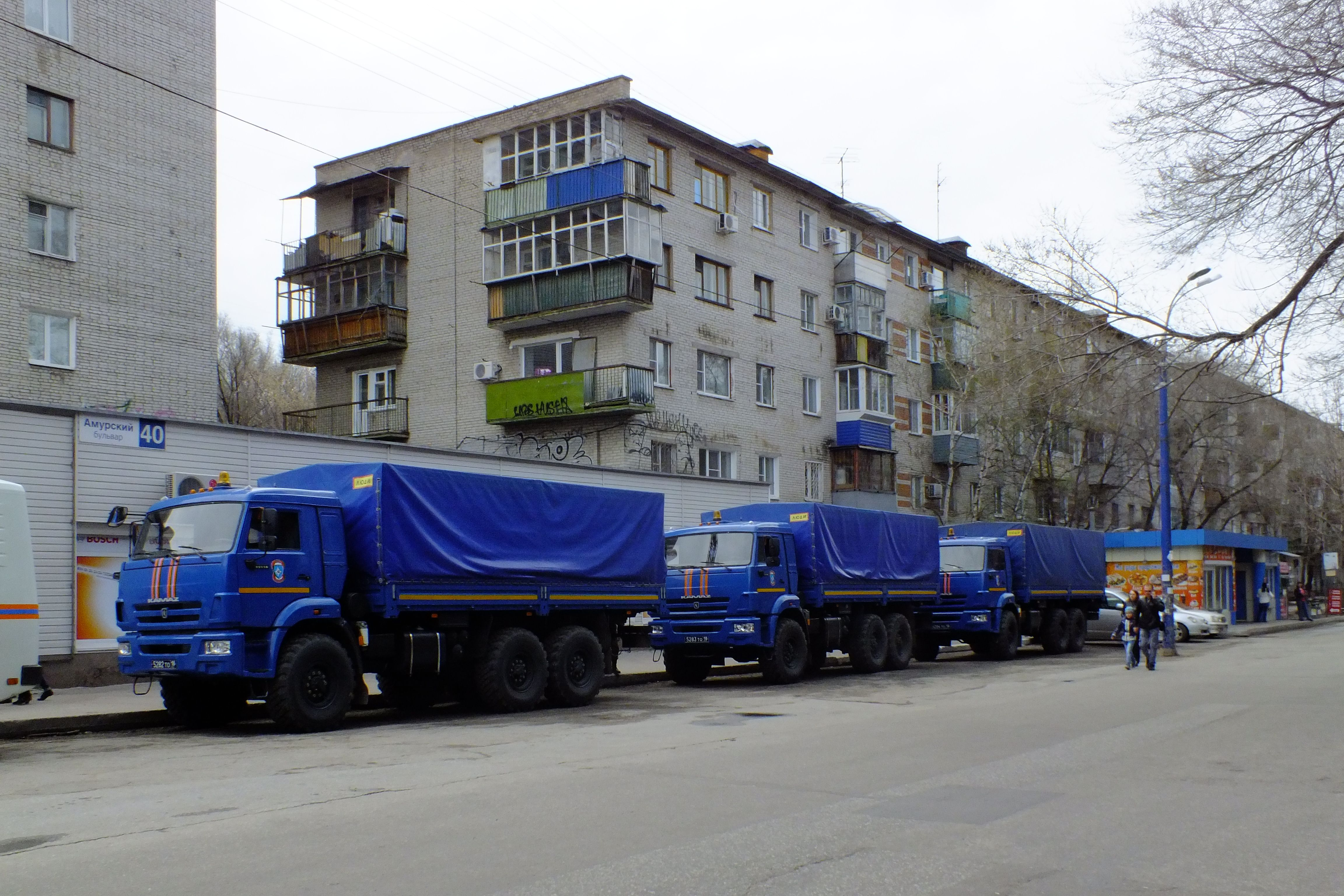
EMERCOM Kamaz logistic trucks

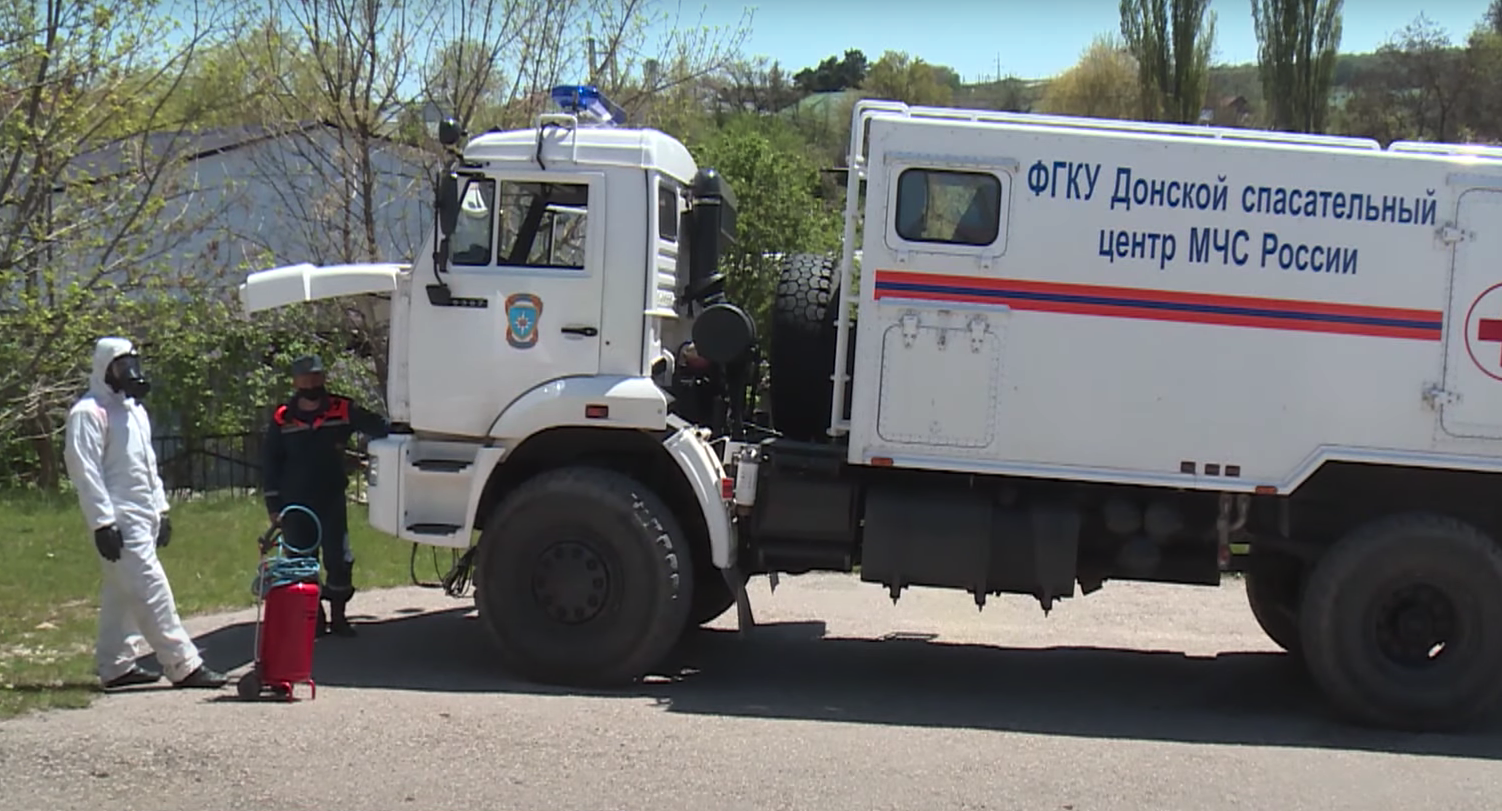
EMERCOM truck from Donskoy rescue center

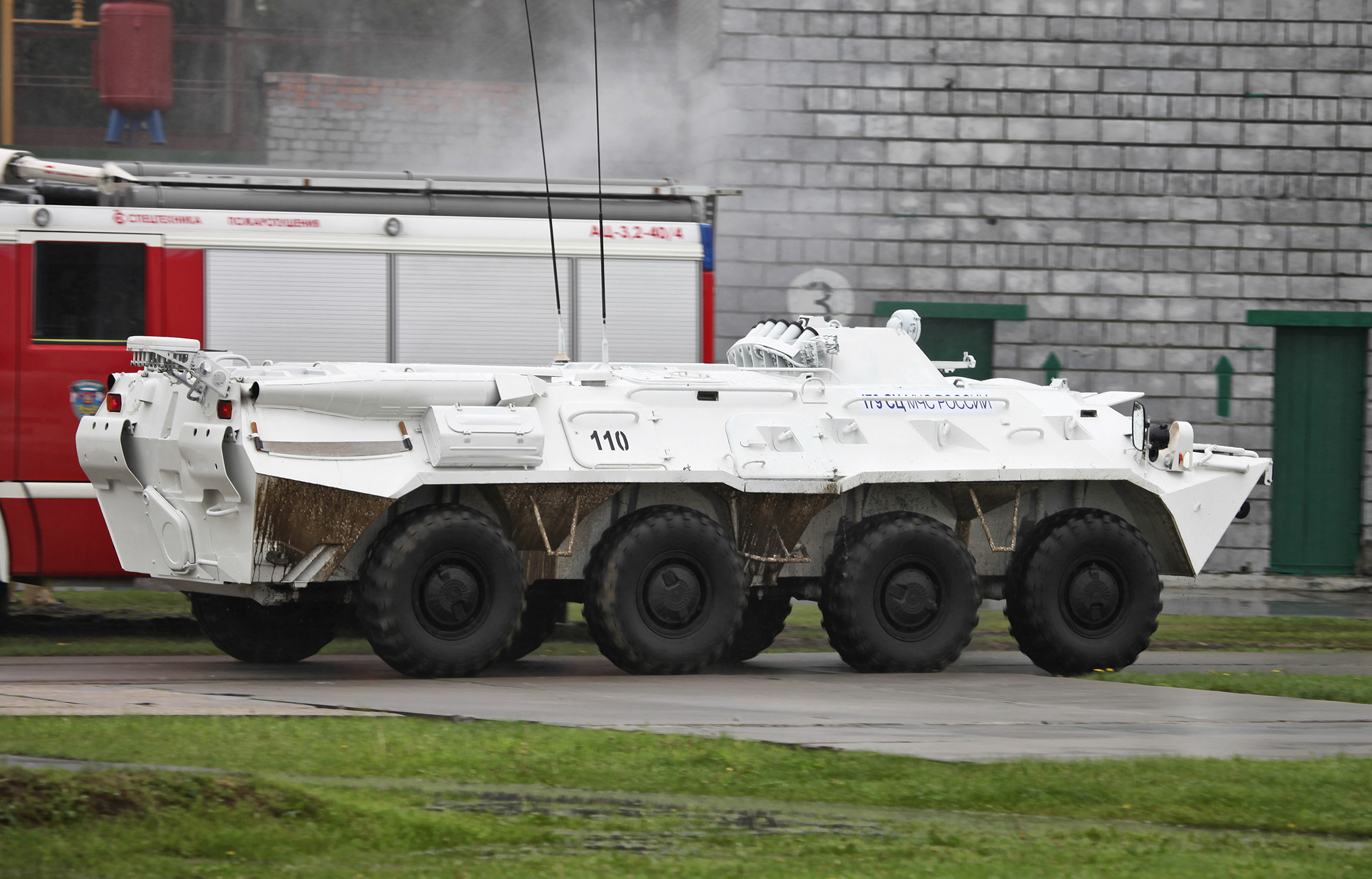
EMERCOM CBRN reconnaissance vehicle BTR-80

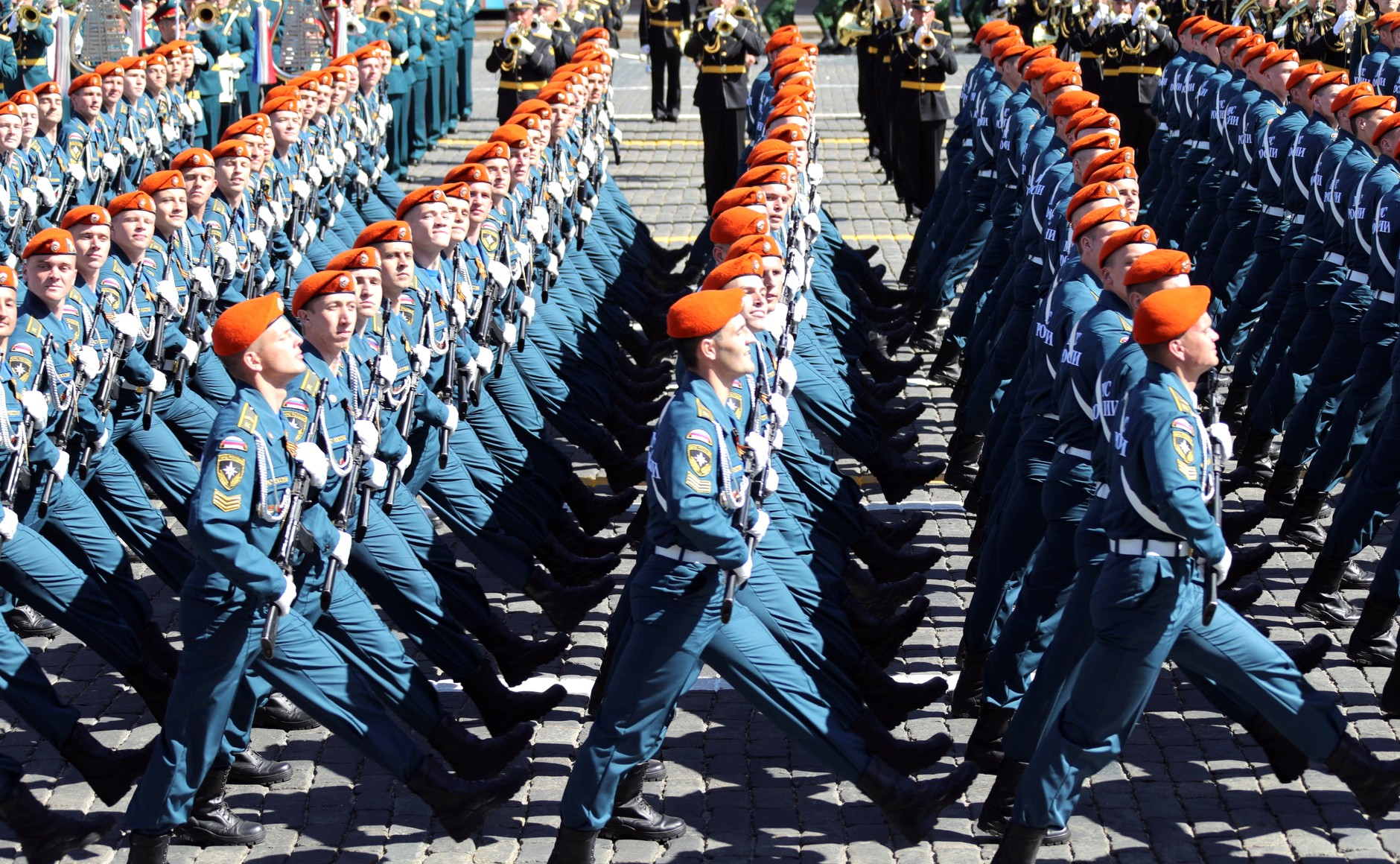
EMERCOM soldiers from Civil Defense Troops on Victory Day Parade 2018

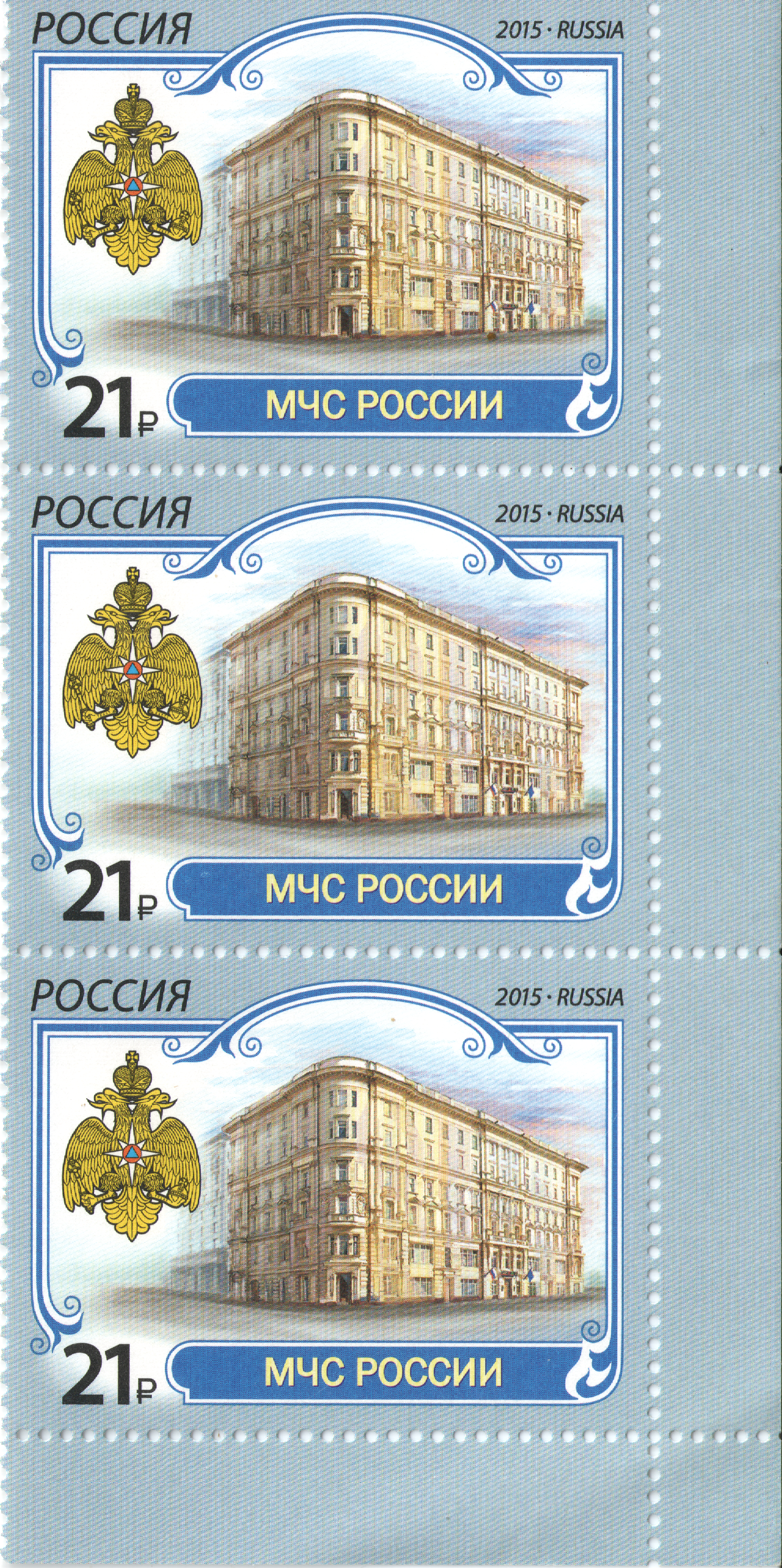
Postal stamps of Russia about EMERCOM

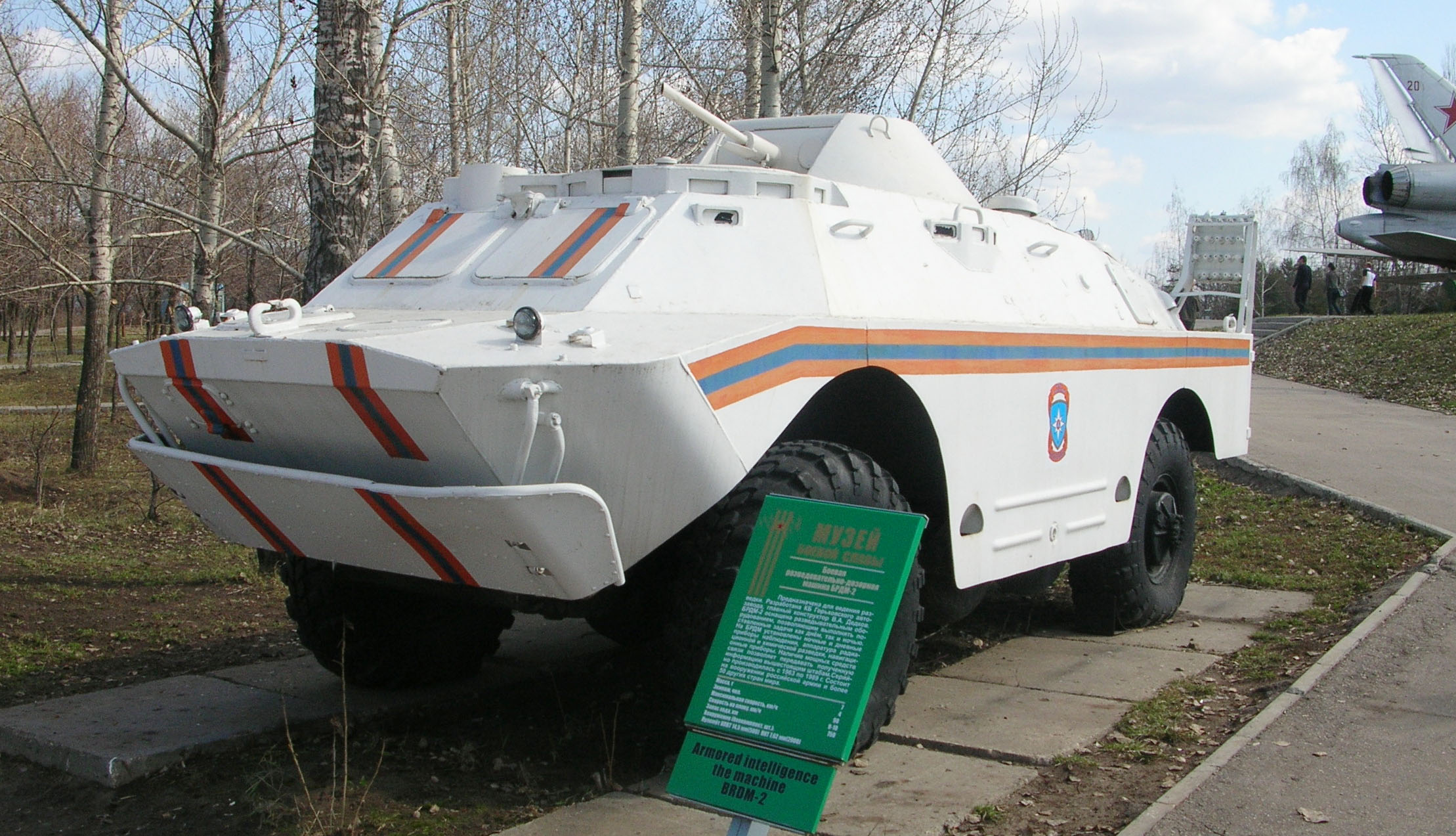
EMERCOM BRDM-2RHB

== See also ==
- Ramenskoye Airport, airbase, used by EMERCOM
- Awards of the Ministry for Emergency Situations of Russia
