= Marian High School =

Marian High School may refer to:

- Marian High School (Indiana), United States
- Marian High School (Massachusetts), United States
- Marian High School (Michigan), United States
- Marian High School (Nebraska), United States

== See also ==
- Marian Catholic High School (disambiguation)
- Purcell Marian High School, Ohio, United States
