= Aleksandr Chupriyan =

Russian politician (born 1958)

- Александр Чуприян
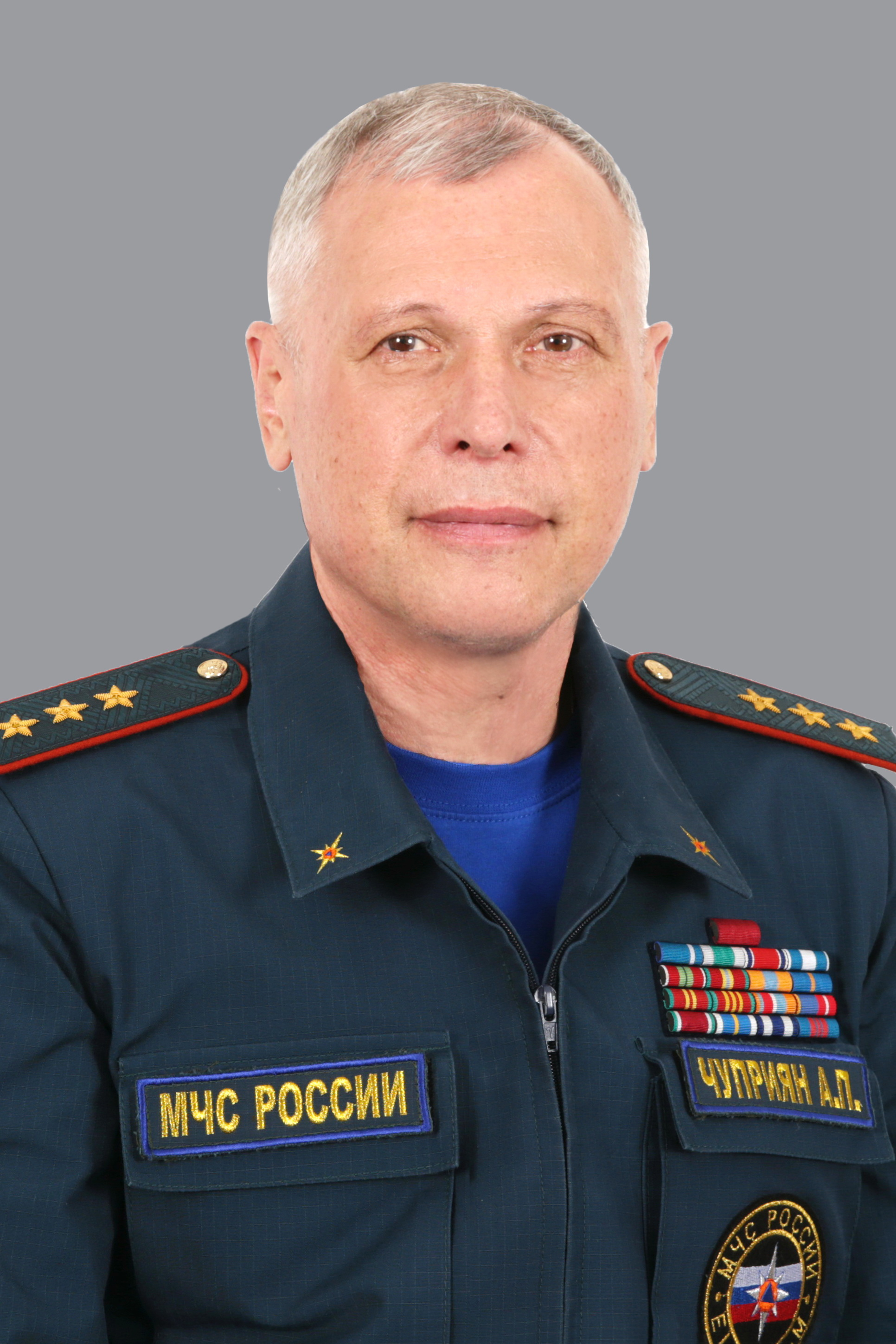
- Official portrait, 2018

Acting Minister of Emergency Situations
- In office 8 September 2021 – 25 May 2022
- President: Vladimir Putin
- Prime Minister: Mikhail Mishustin
- Preceded by: Yevgeny Zinichev
- Succeeded by: Aleksandr Kurenkov

First Deputy Minister of Emergency Situations
- Incumbent
- Assumed office 4 July 2018

Deputy Minister of Emergency Situations
- In office 13 November 2006 – 4 June 2018

Personal details
- Born: 23 March 1958 (age 68) Ukhta, Russian SFSR, Soviet Union
- Education: Military Academy of the General Staff of the Armed Forces of Russia

Aleksandr Petrovich Chupriyan (Russian: Александр Петрович Чуприян, born 23 March 1958) is a Russian statesman, and political military commander, who served as the interim Minister of Emergency Situations between 8 September 2021 and 25 May 2022.

At the same time, Chupriyan is the first deputy minister of emergency situations as of 2018.

He is a colonel general of the Internal Service as of 2018, and a doctor of technical sciences awarded in 2007.

== Biography ==
Aleksandr Chupriyan was born in Ukhta on 23 March 1958. He graduated from high school. From 1976 to 1978 he served in the Soviet Army. He is of Armenian heritage.

In 1979, Chupriyan was a firefighter in the service of the Fire Department of the Central Internal Affairs Directorate of the Leningrad Regional Executive Committee of the Soviet Ministry of Internal Affairs. He graduated from the courses of the middle commanding staff of the fire department in 1980. In 1980, he was the chief of the guard of the 14th militarized fire department of the 7th detachment of the paramilitary fire brigade. In 1982, he was the deputy head, then in 1983, he was promoted to the head of the 3rd militarized fire brigade of the 7th detachment of the paramilitary fire brigade, the Fire Department of the Central Internal Affairs Directorate of the Leningrad City Executive Committee. In 1987, he was the deputy chief of the 1st detachment of the paramilitary fire brigade.

In 1989, he graduated from the Higher Engineering Fire-Fighting School of the Ministry of Internal Affairs of the USSR with a degree in fire-fighting and safety engineer. The same year, he was the head of the 1st detachment of the paramilitary fire brigade. Later on, he was the head of the 7th detachment of the militarized fire brigade of the Fire Department of the Main Directorate of Internal Affairs of the Leningrad City Executive Committee.

In 1993, he was the Deputy Head of the State Fire Service Directorate of the Main Directorate of Internal Affairs of Saint Petersburg and Leningrad Oblast. In 1996, he was the Deputy Head of the Department of the Saint-Petersburg University of the State Fire Service of the EMERCOM of Russia. In 1997, he was the acting Head of the State Fire Service Directorate of the Main Directorate of Internal Affairs of Saint Petersburg and the Leningrad Region.

The same year, he was promoted to the head of the Department of the State Fire Service of the Main Directorate of Internal Affairs of Saint Petersburg and Leningrad Oblast.

He is a candidate of Science (Engineering) in 2001.

After the transfer of the State Fire Service from the Ministry of Internal Affairs to the EMERCOM of Russia in 2002, he continued to work in the same position. In 2003, he was the Head of the Main Directorate of the State Fire Service of the EMERCOM of Russia. Since 2005, he was the Head of the North-West Regional Center of the Ministry of the Russian Federation for Civil Defense, Emergencies and Elimination of Consequences of Natural Disasters.

Between 2006 and 2018, Chupriyan was the Deputy Minister of the Russian Federation for Civil Defense, Emergencies and Elimination of the Consequences of Natural Disasters, (reappointed by Presidential Decree No. 1575 of December 3, 2011).

Chupriyan was a lieutenant general of the Internal Service in 2007, then promoted to colonel general in 2018.

Since June 2018, Chupriyan is the first First Deputy Minister of Emergency Situations.

He was the chairman of the Board of Trustees of the Federation of Fire and Applied Sports of Russia.

In November 2018, he was unanimously elected President of the International Sports Federation of Firefighters and Rescuers.

On 8 September 2021, after the death of the Minister of Emergency Situations, Yevgeny Zinichev, Chupriyan was appointed the acting minister. He was succeeded on 25 May 2022 by Aleksandr Kurenkov.
