= Marquette Catholic High School =

Marquette Catholic High School may refer to:

- Marquette Catholic High School (Alton, Illinois)
- Marquette Catholic High School (Michigan City, Indiana)
- Marquette High School (Bellevue, Iowa)
- Marquette High School (Ottawa, Illinois)
- Marquette Catholic Schools, with a high school campus in West Point, Iowa
