= Marian Catholic High School =

Marian Catholic High School may refer to:

- Marian Catholic High School (Illinois), United States
- Marian Catholic High School (Pennsylvania), United States
- Mater Dei Catholic High School (Chula Vista, California), United States (formerly Marian Catholic High School)

== See also ==
- Marion Catholic High School, Ohio, United States
- Marin Catholic High School, California, United States
- Marian Central Catholic High School, Illinois, United States
- Marian High School (disambiguation)
