= Yevgeny Zinichev =

Russian politician and general (1966–2021)

Hero of the Russian Federation General of the Army Yevgeny Zinichev
- Евгений Зиничев
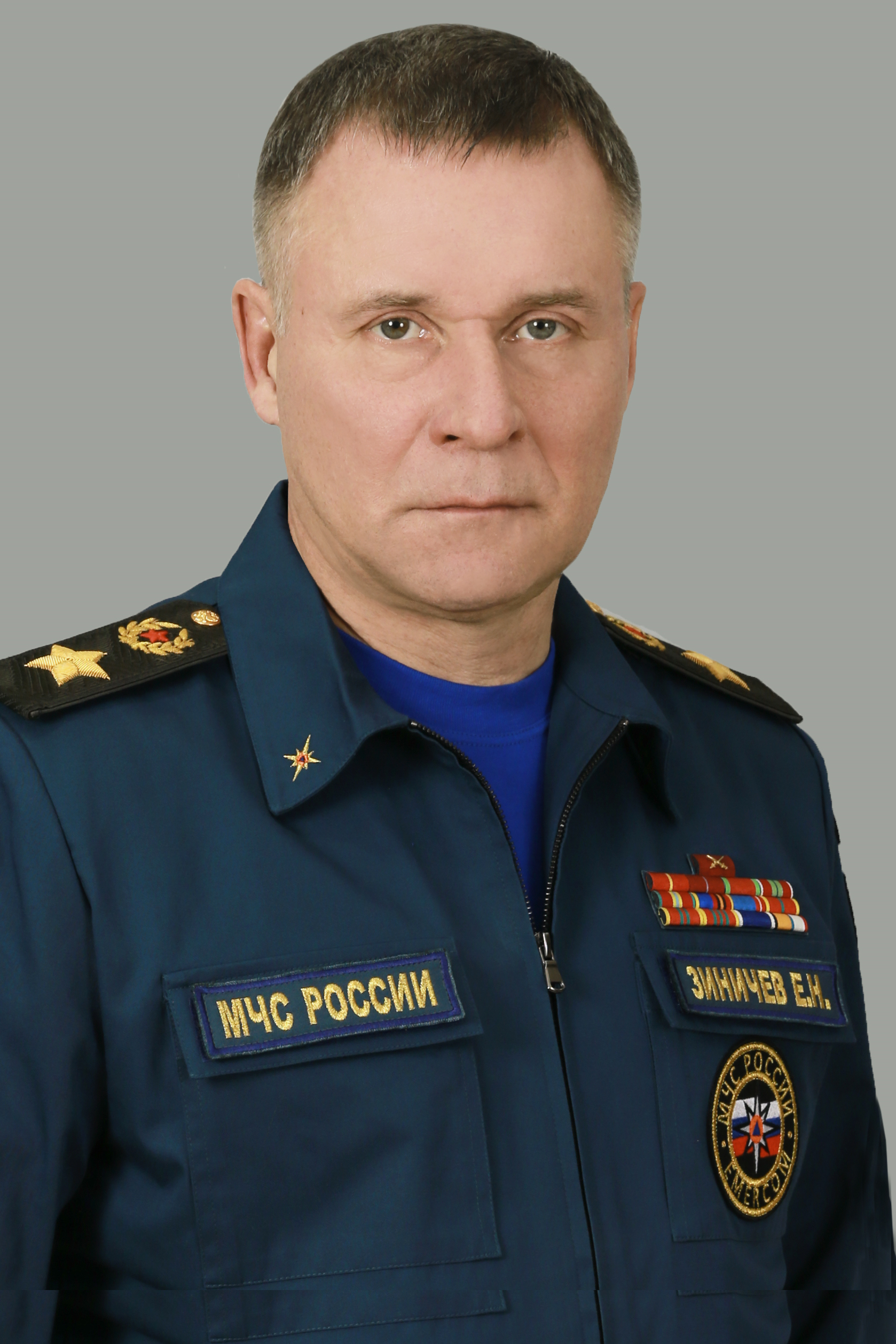
- Official portrait, 2020

Minister of Emergency Situations
- In office 18 May 2018 – 8 September 2021
- President: Vladimir Putin
- Prime Minister: Dmitry Medvedev; Mikhail Mishustin
- Preceded by: Vladimir Puchkov
- Succeeded by: Aleksandr Chupriyan (interim)

Deputy Director of the Federal Security Service
- In office 7 October 2016 – 18 May 2018

Governor of Kaliningrad Oblast
- Acting
- In office 28 July 2016 – 6 October 2016
- Preceded by: Nikolay Tsukanov
- Succeeded by: Anton Alikhanov

Director of the Kaliningrad Oblast FSB branch
- In office 4 June 2015 – 28 July 2016
- Preceded by: Alexander Kozlov
- Succeeded by: Vasily Petrenko

Personal details
- Born: 18 August 1966 Leningrad, Russian SFSR, Soviet Union
- Died: 8 September 2021 (aged 55) Norilsk, Russia
- Party: Independent
- Children: 1
- Education: Military Academy of the General Staff of the Armed Forces of Russia

Military service
- Allegiance: Soviet Union (until 1991); Russia (1991–2021)
- Branch/service: Committee for State Security; Federal Security Service; Federal Protective Service; EMERCOM
- Rank: General of the Army

Yevgeny Nikolayevich Zinichev (Russian: Евгений Николаевич Зиничев; 18 August 1966 – 8 September 2021) was a Russian politician and military officer. He served as the Minister of Emergency Situations from 2018 until his death, and was also a member of the Security Council of Russia. In 2016, he served as the acting Governor of Kaliningrad Oblast before being replaced by Anton Alikhanov. He was last ranked General of the Army in 2020.

== Early life ==
Yevgeny Zinichev was born in Leningrad on 18 August 1966.

From 1984 to 1986, after graduation from high school, he served on the call-up service in the Northern Fleet of the Soviet Navy.

Zinichev graduated from the St. Petersburg Institute of Business and Law, receiving diplomas on graduation from two faculties: economics and "finance and credit".

== Career ==
=== Intelligence services ===
Zinichev was a KGB officer from 1987 until 1991, and a member of the Communist Party of the Soviet Union. He worked at the Central Office of the Federal Security Service of Russia, going from operative officer to head of regional management. In 1991, he joined the Federal Security Service.

From 2006 until 2015, Zinichev worked in the personal security of the Presidential Security Service, accompanying the Russian President Dmitry Medvedev and Prime Minister Vladimir Putin on working trips. In the archival photographs ITAR-TASS, during this period, he was referred to as an "FSO officer" or "FSB officer", everywhere in the immediate vicinity of Putin.

In 2014, he was appointed as the Deputy Head of the Russian Federal Security Service.

In June 2015, Zinichev was appointed Chief of the Federal Security Service of Russia in the Kaliningrad Oblast, replacing Alexander Kozlov in this post.

The official biography of Zinichev says that from 1987 to 2015, he "served in various positions in state security agencies". Specific service locations are however not specified.

On 28 July 2016, amid the largest staff rotation of 2016, President Putin appointed Zinichev as acting Governor of Kaliningrad Oblast. His predecessor, Nikolay Tsukanov was appointed plenipotentiary of the president in the Northwestern Federal District at that time.

During his first press conference, which lasted 49 seconds, he indicated that his priority was to attract investment to the Kaliningrad Oblast and stabilize the socio-economic situation.

On 6 October 2016, he resigned from his post as governor of the Kaliningrad region due to "family circumstances". He had been in office for 70 days. His successor was Anton Alikhanov.

On 7 October 2016, Zinichev was appointed deputy director of the FSB. In the same month, he was awarded the rank of lieutenant general.

=== Minister of Emergency Situations ===
On 17 May 2018, Prime Minister Medvedev nominated Zinichev for the post of head of the Ministry of Emergency Situations of Russia instead of Vladimir Puchkov. Putin endorsed the election of the prime minister and approved a new cabinet with Zinichev as Minister of Emergency Situations.

By Putin's decree on 28 May 2018, he was included in the Security Council of the Russian Federation.

In December 2018, Zinichev was promoted to the rank of Colonel-General in the post of Minister of Emergency Situations.

On 15 January 2020, he resigned as part of the cabinet, after President Vladimir Putin delivered the Presidential Address to the Federal Assembly, in which he proposed several amendments to the constitution. He was reinstated on 21 January 2020.

== Death ==
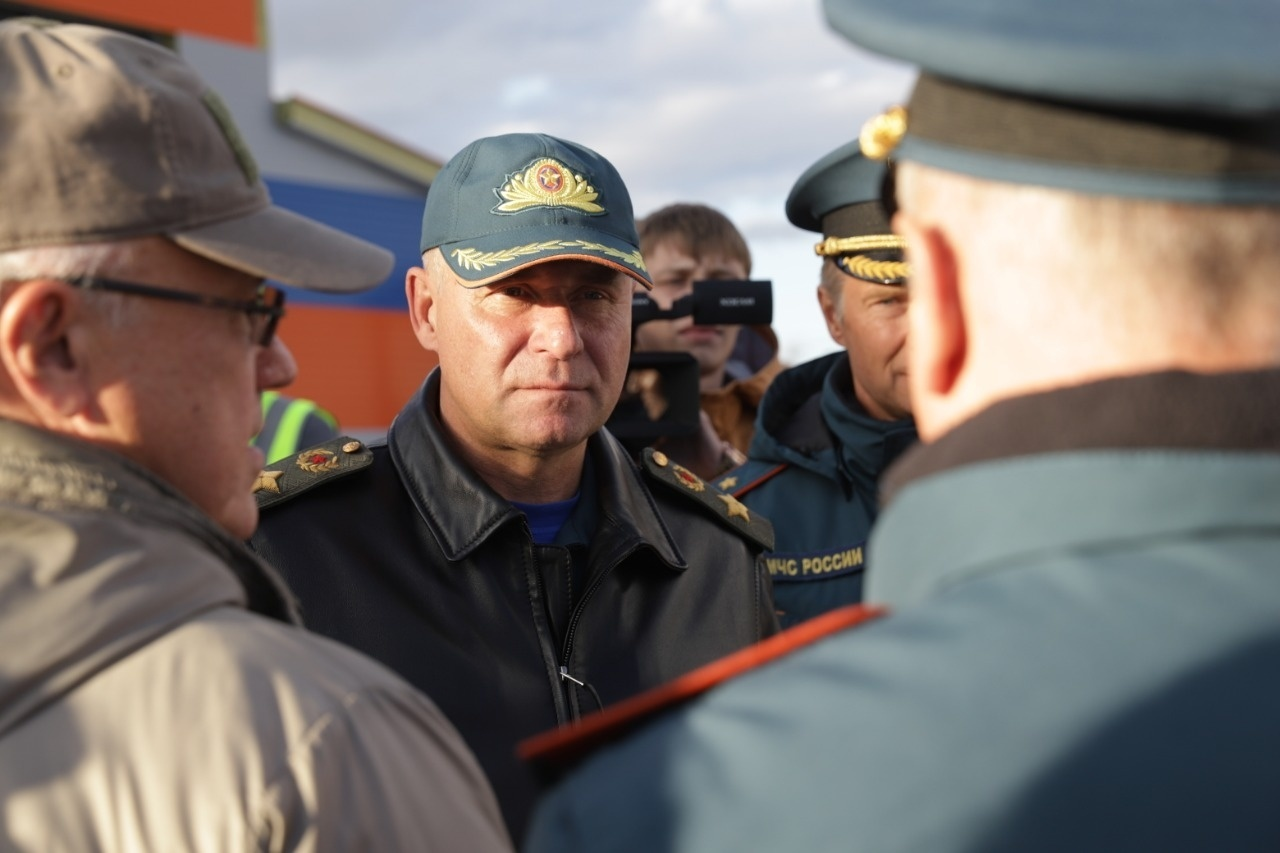
One of the last photos of Zinichev, taken in Norilsk, a few hours before the death of the minister

Zinichev died on 8 September 2021 in Norilsk, aged 55, during the filming of an interdepartmental exercise to protect the Arctic zone of Russia. According to the ministry, he fell off a cliff while trying to save the life of director and cameraman Aleksandr Melnik, who also died. His death was the first case in the history of post-Soviet Russia of the death of an incumbent federal minister.

Condolences were given by President Putin, his colleagues in the cabinet such as Sergei Shoigu and Sergey Lavrov, as well as foreign figures such as Armenian Prime Minister Nikol Pashinyan, Serbian President Aleksandar Vučić and Israeli Foreign Minister Yair Lapid. On 9 September, by a decree of the President of Russia, Zinichev was awarded the title of Hero of the Russian Federation posthumously.

The farewell to the minister took place on 10 September at the EMERCOM National Crisis Center in Moscow on the same day he was buried in St. Petersburg at the Northern Cemetery.

== Personal life ==
Zinichev was married, and had a son, a grandson and two granddaughters.

== See also ==
- List of Heroes of the Russian Federation
