= Axion (disambiguation) =

An axion is a hypothetical elementary particle.

Axion may also refer to:

- Axion (mythology), the name of two mythological figures
- Axion (brand), a brand of dishwashing liquid product marketed by Colgate-Palmolive
- Axion (beetle), a genus of lady beetles
- "Axion Estin" or "It is Truly Meet", a hymn of the Eastern Orthodox and Greek-Catholic Churches
  - "To Axion Esti", a poem by Odysseas Elytis
- Google Axion, an ARM-based chip introduced in 2024
- Montreal Axion, a Canadian hockey team
- Cable Axion, a Canadian cable television distributor and Internet service provider
- Claas Axion, a French tractor
- Axion (tribe), a Tribe that existed in Lenape
- Axxion, a guitar model produced by ESP Dave Mustaine

== See also ==
- Action (disambiguation)
- Axon (disambiguation)
- Axiom (disambiguation)
- Acxiom (disambiguation)
