= Axiom (disambiguation) =

An axiom is a proposition in mathematics and epistemology that is taken to be self-evident or is chosen as a starting point of a theory.

Axiom may also refer to:

== Music ==
- Axiom (band), a 1970s Australian rock band featuring Brian Cadd and Glenn Shorrock
- Axiom (record label), best known for Bill Laswell releases
- Axiom (Archive album), 2014
- Axiom (Christian Scott album), 2020
- "Axiom", a song by British blackened death metal band Akercocke
- Axiom (rapper), rapper, beatmaker and record producer
- Axioms (album), a 1999 album by Asia

== Computers and information technology ==
- Axiom (computer algebra system), a free, general-purpose computer algebra system
- AXIOM (camera), a professional grade open hardware and free software digital cinema camera
- Axiom Engine, 3D computer graphics engine
- Apache Axiom, a library providing a lightweight XML object model

== Companies ==
- Axiom Research Labs, an aerospace company also known as TeamIndus
- Axiom Space, a company planning to build a private space station
- Axiom Telecom, a technology retailer in the UAE and Saudi Arabia

== Other uses ==
- Axiom, the name of the luxury starship in the film WALL-E and in the home short BURN-E
- Axioms (journal), an academic journal
- Isuzu Axiom, a sport utility vehicle produced 2001–2004
- Axiom (wrestler), ring name of professional wrestler Carlos Ruiz

== See also ==
- Axiomatic (disambiguation)
- Axion (disambiguation)
- Acxiom (disambiguation)
