= Axon (disambiguation) =

An axon is part of a neuron.

Axon may also refer to:

== Corporations ==
- Axon Enterprise, an American law enforcement technology company
- Axon Automotive, a British car manufacturer
- HCL Axon, British management consultants
- Axon Labs, a former sleep product company

== Other uses ==
- Axon (surname)
- Axons (Doctor Who), fictional creatures from the TV series
- Peter Axon, a character in the science fiction series Psi Factor
- Axon, a smartphone series made by ZTE

== See also ==
- Axone (disambiguation)
- Axion (disambiguation)
