= Jegou's Island =

Coordinates: 40.0817°N 74.8499°W

Jegou's Island or Chygoe's Island is a former island located at the junction of Assiscunk Creek and the Delaware River, on which the central portion of the city of Burlington, in Burlington County, New Jersey, is located. The Moat, a now partially filled distributary of Assiscunk Creek, formerly separated the island from the mainland.

== Toponymy ==
This island was named for Peter Jegou, an early settler thereof. It has been corrupted at times to Chygoe's Island, and erroneously attributed to the name of a Lenape sachem.

== History ==
In 1668 New Jersey Governor Philip Carteret granted land on the island to a Frenchman, Peter Jegou, for the purpose of operating a tavern. Jegou subsequently purchased additional property from Cornelis Jorissen, Jurien Macelis and Jan Claessen. In 1668 Jegou's establishment was attacked and plundered by the Lenape.

The island was selected in 1677 for the location of a town, Burlington, which would be designated as the capital of West New Jersey. Quaker leader George Fox described it as "a very fit place for a town". On May 7, 1733, Burlington was granted city status.

The growth of Burlington City over the centuries has resulted in the filling and culverting of parts of The Moat, connecting Jegou's Island to the mainland.
