= Milov =

Milov (Russian: Милов) is a Russian masculine surname originating from the Slavic root "mil-", meaning "dear", "cute"; its feminine counterpart is Milova. It may refer to the following notable people:

- Alexander Milov (born 1979), Ukrainian artist and sculptor
- Alika Milova (born 2002), Estonian singer
- Kiril Milov (born 1997), Bulgarian Greco-Roman wrestler.
- Ksenia Milova (born 1992), Russian handball player
- Leonid Milov (1929–2007) Russian historian
- Vadim Milov (born 1972), Swiss grandmaster of chess
- Valeria Milova (born 1988), Estonian dancer and choreographer
- Vladimir Milov (born 1972), Russian politician
- The Russian name for Mylove, a village in Ukraine
