= Tractor, timber and agricultural machinery in the Soviet Union =

Agricultural machinery in the Soviet Union has had a presence since the beginning of the union in the 1920s however many developments in this industry occurred during the USSR's existence such as the opening of domestic factories for agricultural equipment beginning in the 1930s, the mass-mechanization of collective farms, and the import of foreign equipment following the collapse of the USSR in 1991

== History ==
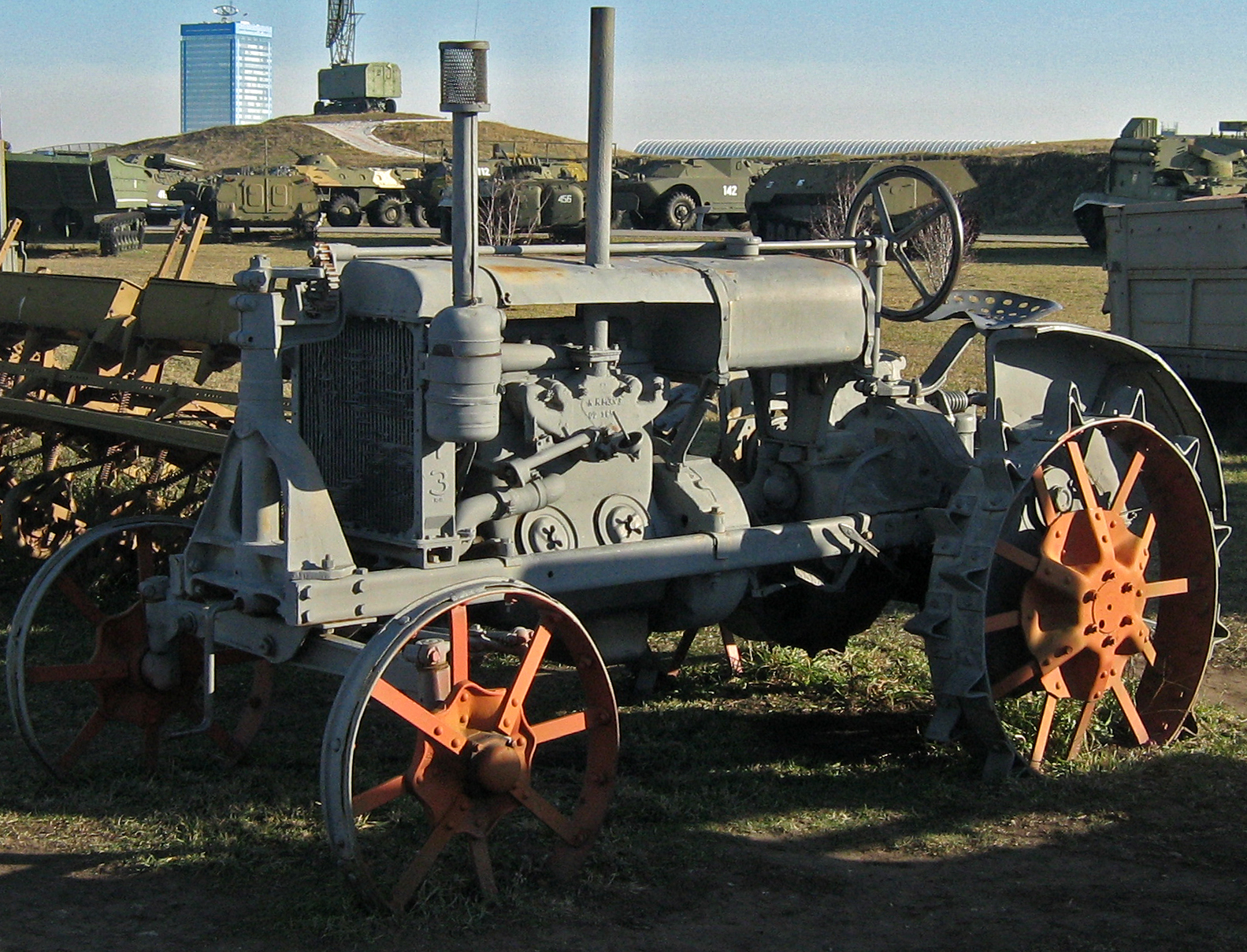
"Universal" Tractor (1934-1940, 1944-1955)

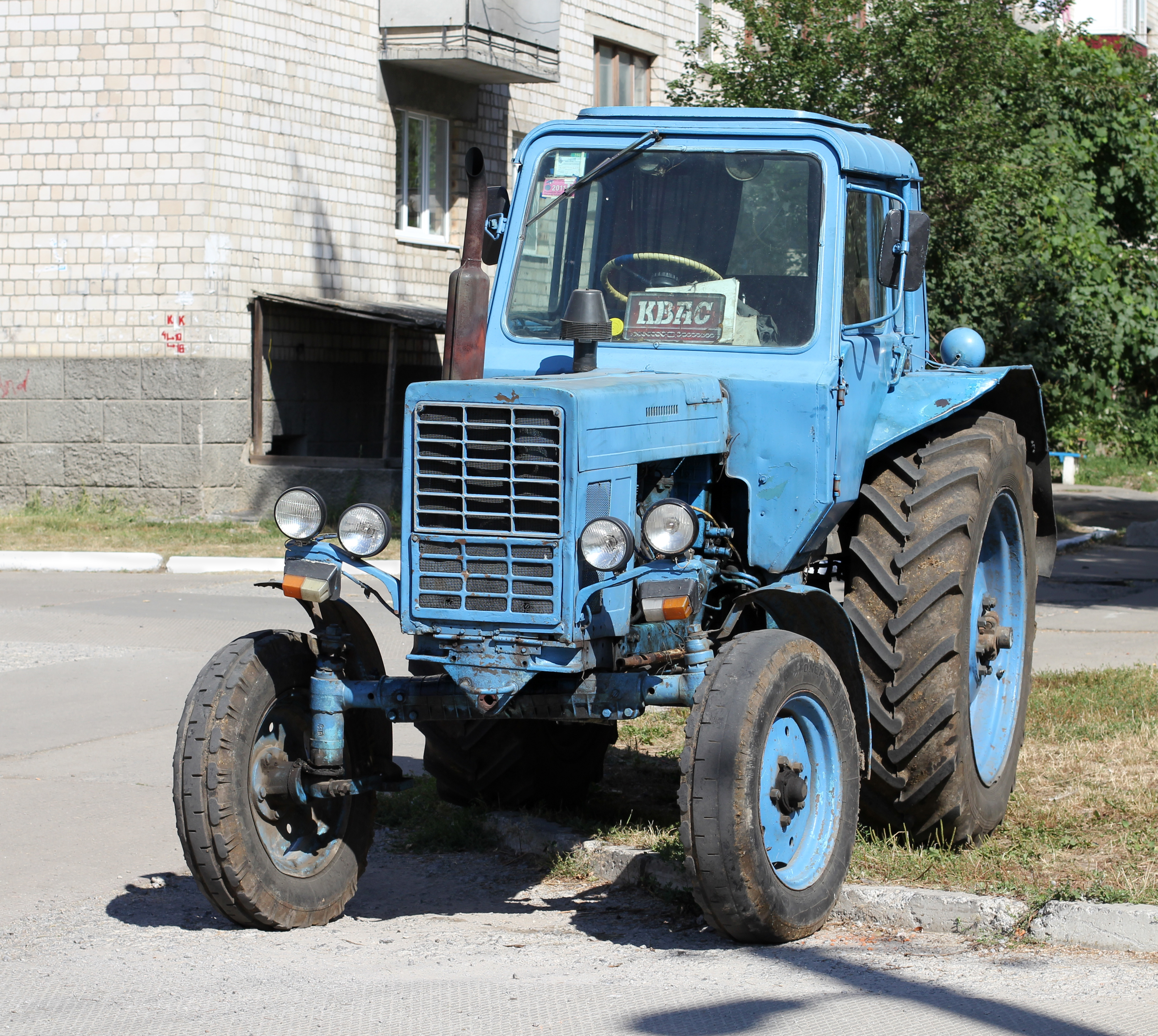
Belarusian MTZ-80 (1974-present)

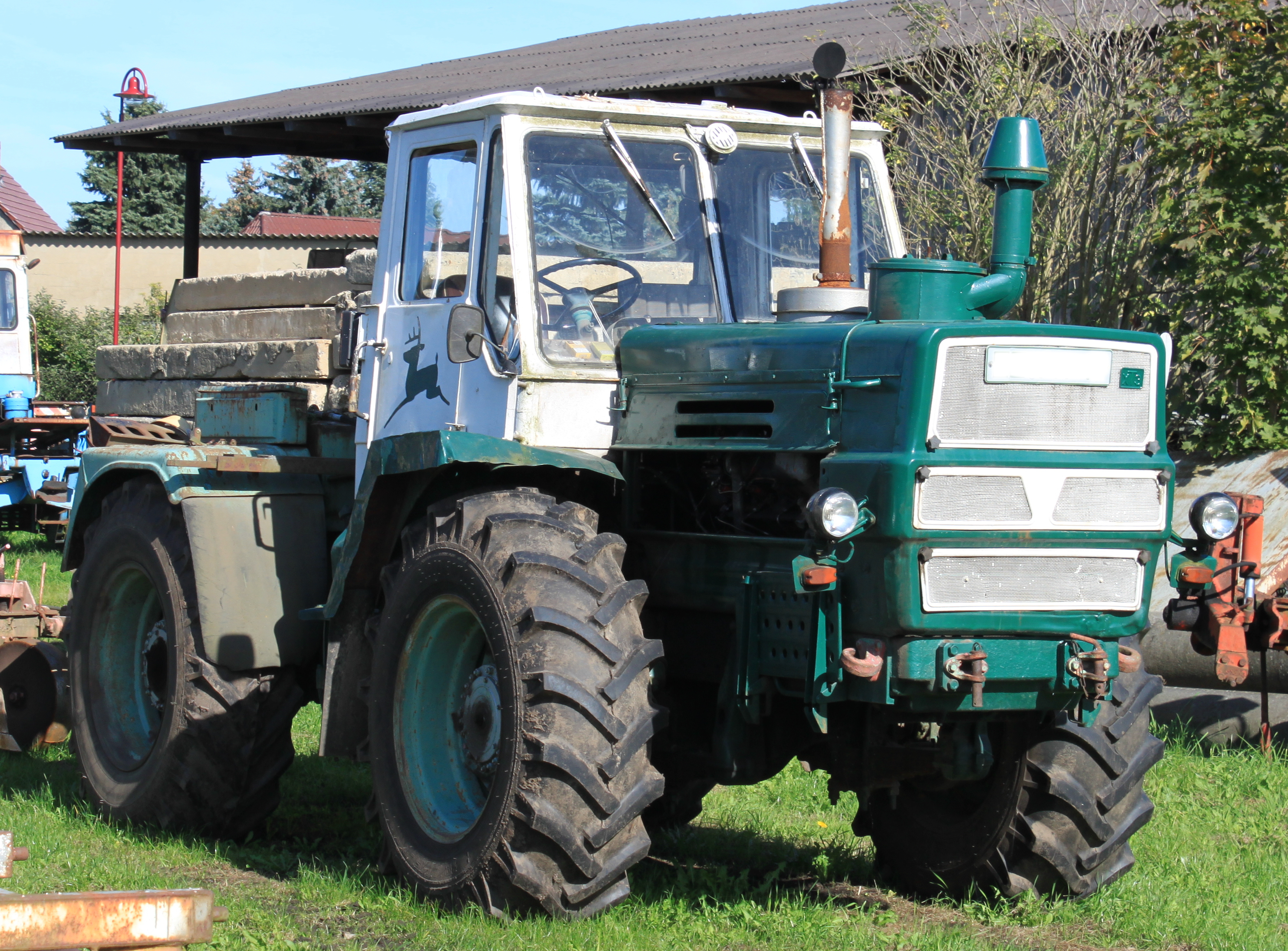
Ukrainian KhTZ T-150K (1971-present)

Logging with a Belarusian MTZ-82L in Estonia (November 2021)

The domestic production and research of Agricultural machinery in Russia began in the mid 1800s when Artisans Andrei Terentyev and Moses Creek created the first Russian threshing machine. Some other events of note include:

- 1888 - Mechanic Fyodor Blinov builds the world's first model of a crawler tractor.
- 1893 - Yakov Mamin invents the plow with two plowshares.
- 1910 - Yakov Mamin created a tractor named "Dwarf", later known as the "Russian tractor".

In 1917 there were approximately 165 tractors across the entirety of Russia, this reflects the lack of industrialization present in the country as the Mass production of agricultural equipment such as tractors only started in the 1930s. After the Bolsheviks took control of the nation following the Russian Civil War, production of agricultural machinery on an industrial scale began.

- 1918 - At a Petrograd factory, the Bolsheviks organized small-scale production of crawler tractors.
- 1921 - The Soviet Government issued a decree "On agricultural engineering".

Following the revolution there was a dramatic change in the agricultural industry as the government pushed a change to Collective Farms which necessitated the introduction of mass-mechanization. Examples of factories include Kolomna, Kharkiv Locomotive Factory, and the Obukhov plant. Most of the production for tractors occurred at the "Red Putilovets" which produced a derivative of the Fordson tractor. The ZAZ produced the first domestic harvesters.

- 1926 - Production started for tractor cultivators that could do continuous tillage .
- 1928 - Production of tractor plows began and the nation at this point has produced 1,300 tractors .
- 1933 - Commissioned in 1930, the Stalingrad Tractor Factory began producing tractors with a capacity of 144 tractors a day. This marked the true beginning of mass-production of tractors in the USSR.
- 1931 - The Kharkiv Tractor Plant was built.
- 1932 - Production of tractor potato harvesters began.
- 1933 - The Chelyabinsk Tractor Plant was built.
- 1937 - The USSR produced 44,000 units of combine harvesters this year which represented the largest such production on Earth, the U.S in comparison only produced 29,000 units that same year.
- 1937 - The S-65 tractor began production which was the first tractor in the USSR with a closed cab.

By the beginning of the Great Patriotic War in 1941, the Soviet Union was the largest producer of crawler tractors in the world. The war greatly affected the entire nation including the production of agricultural machinery which was heavily disrupted by the destruction of several factories and the relocation of others to the eastern areas of the Union. Furthermore the economy changed to primarily support the war effort until the production of tractors resumed in 1944. After the war concluded, many more advancements in the agricultural industry followed as the USSR rebuilt.

- 1947 - The S-4, the first domestic self-propelled combine harvester began production.
- 1948 - The Minsk Tractor Works started production of the first Soviet skidder KT-12.
- 1956 - The S-100, the first industrial tractor began production.
- 1957 - The DET-250, the first Soviet high-power industrial tractor diesel-electric drive began production.
- 1960 - The Soviet Union had the largest production of tractors in the world .
- 1975 - The T-330, the first Soviet tractor-bulldozer with a front cabin began production.
- 1983 - The T-800, Europe's largest tractor began production. It was designed to work as a crawler dozer, it weighed 106 tons. (without blade length - 7945 mm, with blade -12 400 mm, width without blade -4185 mm, Width -6000 mm blade height -4775 mm.).
- 1991 - USSR collapses, many factories either close or are privatized.
- 2001 - The state-owned company Rosagroleasing is established to provide support for agricultural producers and to support leasing program.
- 2003 - Concern Tractor plants was founded, uniting the main Russian producers of tractors.
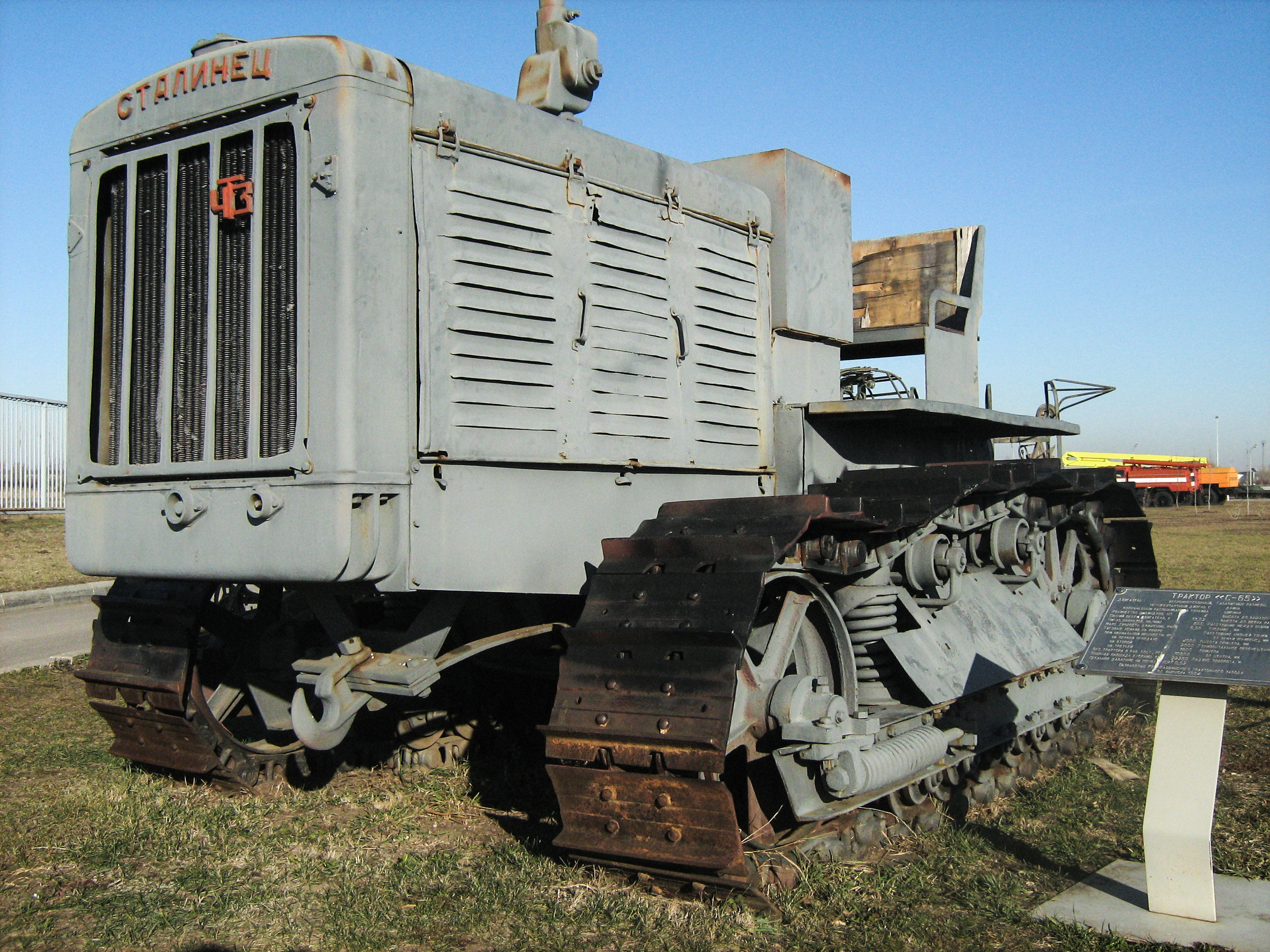
Stalinets S-65 (1937-1941)

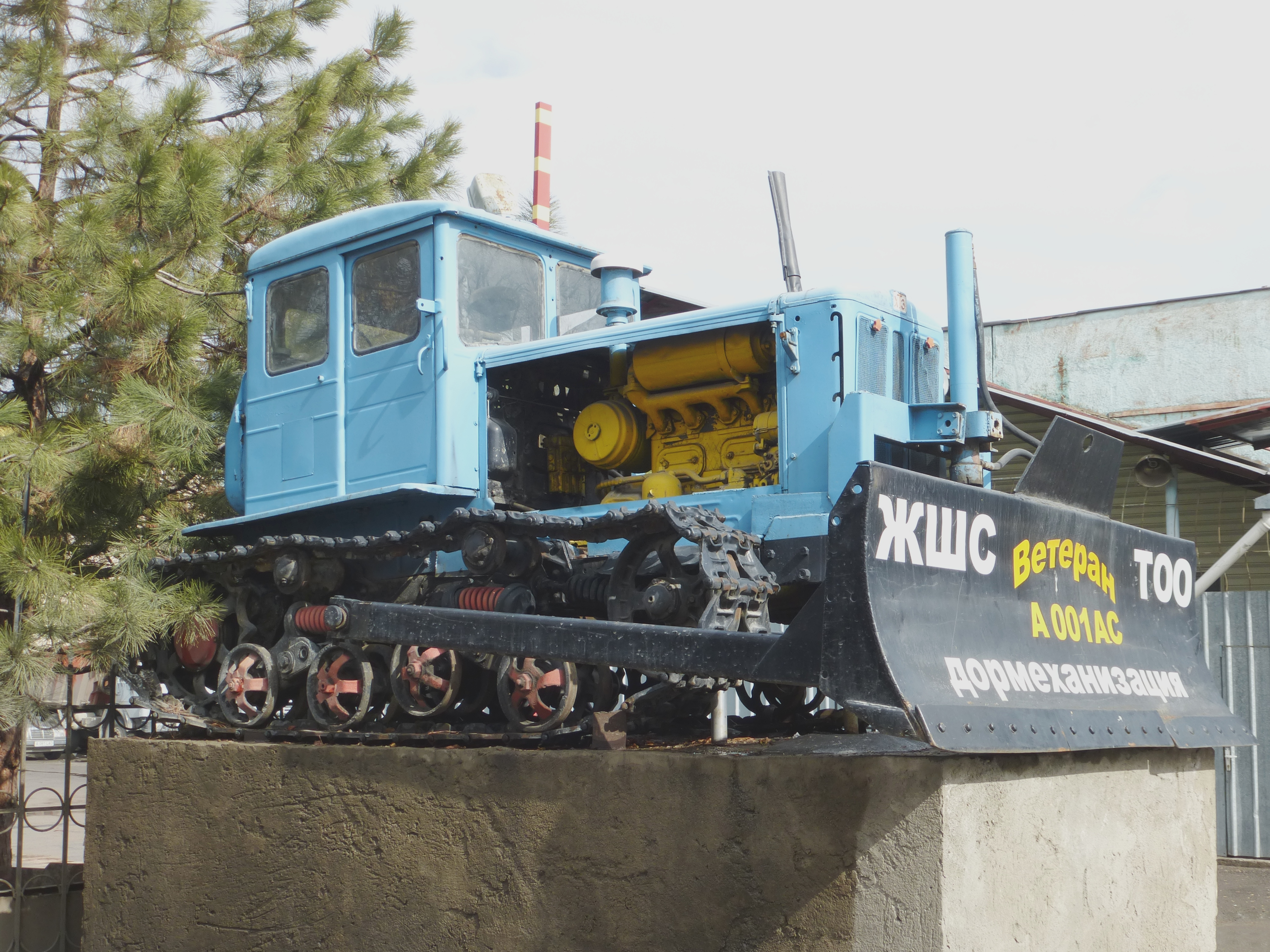
DT-54 (1949-1979)

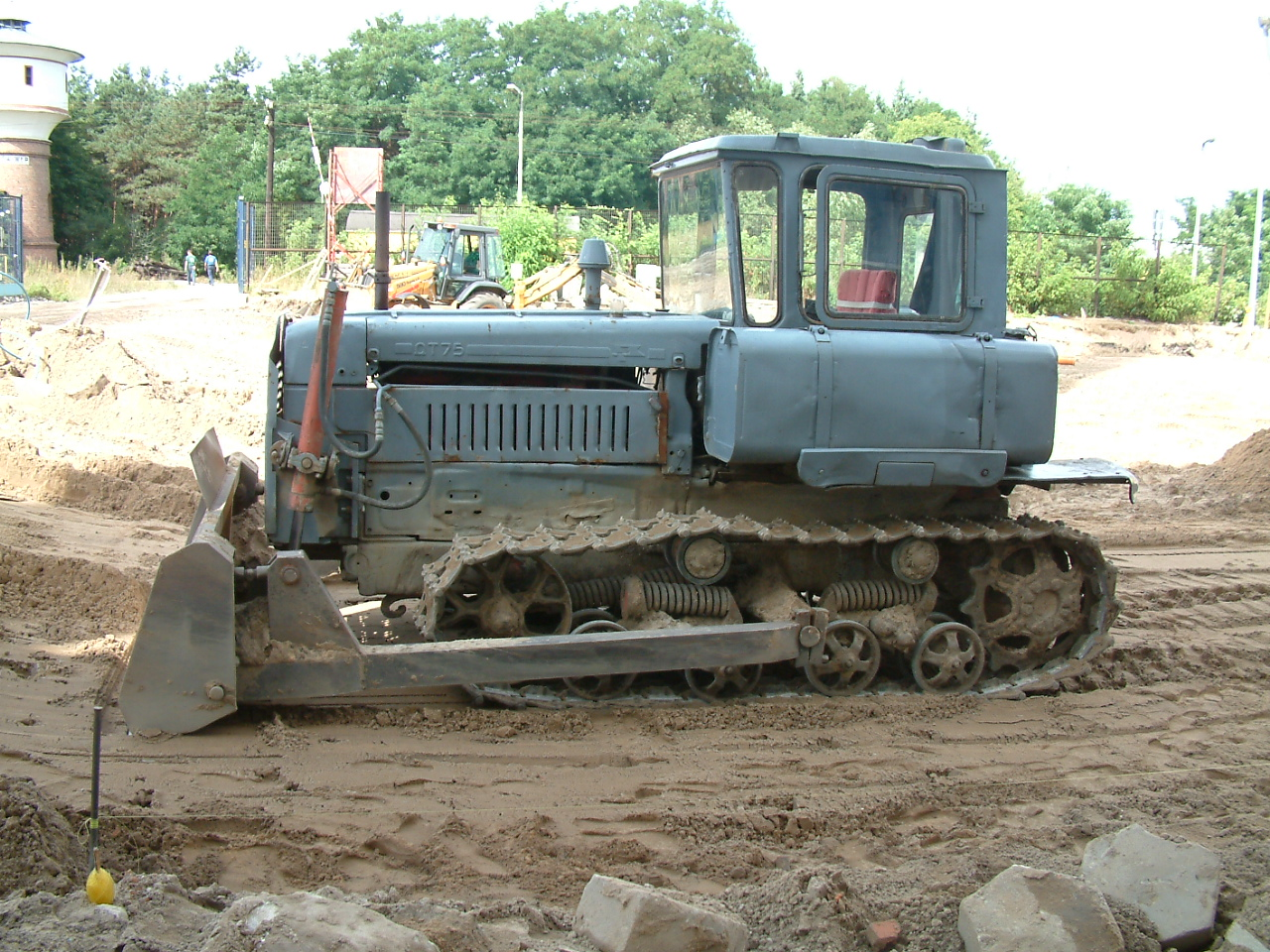
DT-75

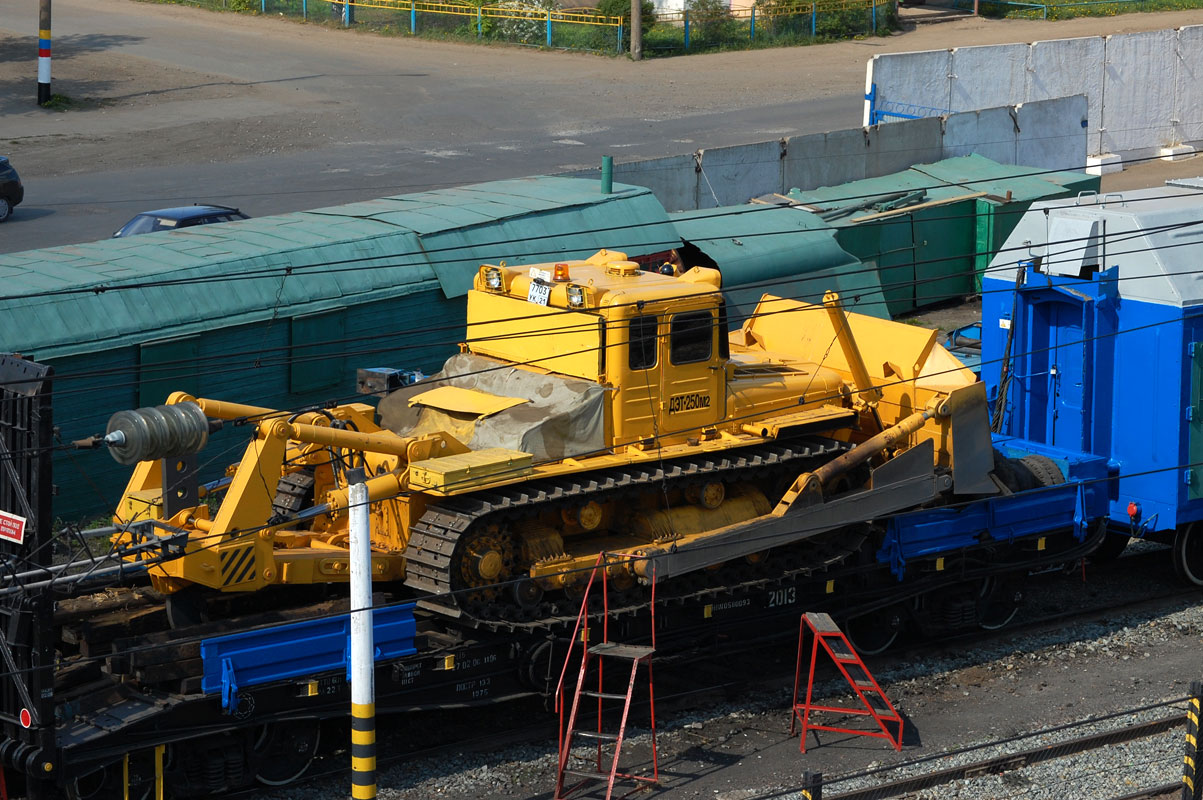
DET-250

== Manufacturers of tractors in the USSR ==
=== Tractor Plants in 1980 ===
Name	Location	Year established	Types of tractors	Models of tractors	Current status
Altay Tractor plant (ATZ)	Rubtsovsk, Russian SFSR	1942	Agricultural and industrial crawler tractors, crawler skidders	T-4A, TT-4	Went bankrupt in 2011
Chelyabinsk Tractor Plant (ChTZ)	Chelyabinsk, Russian SFSR	1933	Agricultural and industrial crawler tractors	T-130, DET-250	Chelyabinsk Tractor Plant in the corporation Uralvagonzavod
Cheboksary Industrial Tractor Plant (ChZPT)	Cheboksary, Russian SFSR	1975	heavy industrial crawler tractor to work as bulldozers	T-330	"Promtractor" plant within the group "Tractor plants"
Vladimir Tractor plant (VTZ)	Vladimir, Russian SFSR	1945	Agricultural wheeled tractors	T-25	Vladimir Motor-Tractor Plant (VMTZ) within the group "Tractor plants"
Lipetsk Tractor plant (LTZ)	Lipetsk, Russian SFSR	1944	Agri-transport tired tractors	T-40	"Lipetsk tractor" plant within the group "Tractor plants", closed since 2009
Kirov Plant	Leningrad, Russian SFSR	1801	Heavy wheeled tractor general purpose terrain	Kirovets K-700	Kirov Plant Company
Volgograd tractor factory (VTZ)	Volgograd, Russian SFSR	1930	Track general purpose agricultural tractors	DT-75	"Tractor Company "VgTZ" within the group "Tractor plants"
Onega Tractor Plant (OTZ)	Petrozavodsk, Karelia, Russian SFSR	1703	tracked skidders	TDT-55	Onega Tractor Plant within the group "Tractor plants"
Minsk Tractor Works (MTZ)	Minsk, Byelorussia	1946	general purpose wheel tractors	MTZ-082 Belarus, MTZ-50 Belarus, MTZ-52 Belarus, MTZ-80 Belarus, MTZ-82 Belarus	Minsk Tractor Works
Kharkiv Tractor Plant (KhTZ)	Kharkiv, Ukraine	1931	tracked and wheeled tractors high-speed all-terrain multi-purpose	T-150, T-74	Kharkiv Tractor Plant
Pivdenmash	Dnipropetrovsk, Ukraine	1944	Agricultural wheeled universally-tilled and transport tractors	YuMZ-6	Pivdenmash, currently does not produce tractors
Chisinau Tractor Plant	Kishinev, Moldavia	1961	beet, viticultural, horticultural crawler tractor with a narrow track	T-54, T-70	ceased production
Kharkiv Tractor propelled chassis	Kharkiv, Ukraine	1949	wheeled tractor self-propelled chassis for mounting bodies and special equipment	T-16	Plant self-propelled chassis
Pavlodar Tractor plant	Pavlodar, Kazakhstan	1966	Track general purpose agricultural tractors	DT-75	Went bankrupt in 1998
Tashkent Tractor Plant (TTZ)	Tashkent, Uzbekistan	1942	wheeled cotton tractors (including tricycles)	T-28Kh2, T-28Kh4, MTZ-50Kh	Tashkent Tractor Plant

=== Combine factories in 1980 ===
Name	Location	Year Established	Types of harvesters	Models of harvesters	Current status
Rostselmash	Rostov-on-Don	1929	combine harvesters	SK-5 Niva	Company "Rostselmash"
Krasnoyarsk Combine Plant	Krasnoyarsk, Russian SFSR	1942	combine harvesters	SKD-5 "Sibiryak"	Joined the group "Tractor Plants", was closed in 2013.
Taganrog Combine Plant	Taganrog, Russian SFSR	1915	Rice-harvesters on crawlers, combine harvesters wheeled	SKGD-6 "Kolos", SK-6II "Kolos"	at its base in 1997 was founded Taganrog Automobile Plant (TagAZ), the production combines discontinued in 2002
Ryazselmash	Ryazan, Russian SFSR	1905	semi-mounted potato harvesters for building with tractors	KKU-2A "Druzhba"	Ryazan Combine Plant, the production is not engaged, the building leased
GOMSELMASH	Gomel, Byelorussia	1930	foragers, trailed forage harvesters	KSK-100, KS-2,6	GOMSELMASH
Dalselmash	Birobidzhan, Russian SFSR	1938	forage harvesters crawler	KSG-3,2	The plant went bankrupt in 2002
Yaroslavl Motor Plant (YaMZ)	Yaroslavl, Russian SFSR	1916	foragers	YaSK-170	Yaroslavl Motor Plant composed of GAZ Group
Ternopil Combine Plant	Ternopil, Ukraine		beet harvesters	KS-6	Ternopol Combine Plant
Kherson Combine Plant	Kherson, Ukraine	1887	self-propelled harvesters corn, trailed harvesters corn	KSKU-6 "Khersonetz-200", KOP-1,4 "Khersonetz-7"	Scientific-Production Enterprise "Kherson Machine-Building Plant"
Bezhetskselmash	Bezhetsk, Russian SFSR	1943	flax pullers	LK-4	Bezhetskselmash
Plodselhozmash	Kishinev, Moldavia		harvesters cabbage, tomatoes, grapes, fruits and berries	UKM-2, SKT-2A, SVK-3M, MPyA-1A	Agromasina

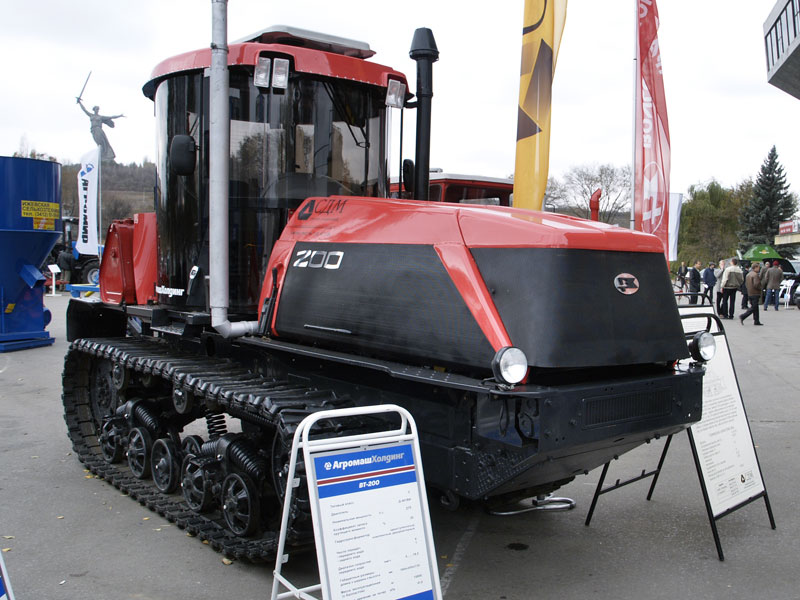
VT-200

== Manufacturers of tractors in Russia ==
=== As part of Concern "Tractor plants" ===
Name	Location	Year established	Types of tractors	Models of tractors
Promtractor	Cheboksary	1975	Bulldozers, Tractors, & Pipelayers	Chetra T11, Chetra T15, Chetra T20, Chetra T25, Chetra TG122, Chetra TG222, Chetra TG302, Chetra TG503, Chetra TG511
Onega Tractor Plant	Petrozavodsk	1703	Crawler tractors, Skid Chokers, Forest Fire Crawler Tractors, Mowers, Tracked Timber Trucks, & conventional Tractors.	Onezhets-310, Onezhets-320, Onezhets-330, Onezhets-335 and other
Krasnoyarsk plant Timber Engineering (KrasLesmash)	Krasnoyarsk	1916	Crawler tractors, Skid Chokers, Felling and Skidding machines, Chokerless manipulator machines, Loaders, & Forwarders	Chetra KS-146, LZ-235, LP-18K, LT-187, TT-4M-23K, LT-188
Volgograd tractor factory	Volgograd	1930	General purpose Crawler Tractors	Agromash-90TG
Vladimir Motor-Tractor Plant (VMTZ)	Vladimir	1945	Universal Wheeled Tractors, Self-propelled Tractors, & Forest Fire Tractors	Agromash-30TK, Agromash-50TK, Agromash-60TK, Agromash-85TK, Agromash-30SCh, Agromash-50SCh, Agromash-60TK 211V MPU

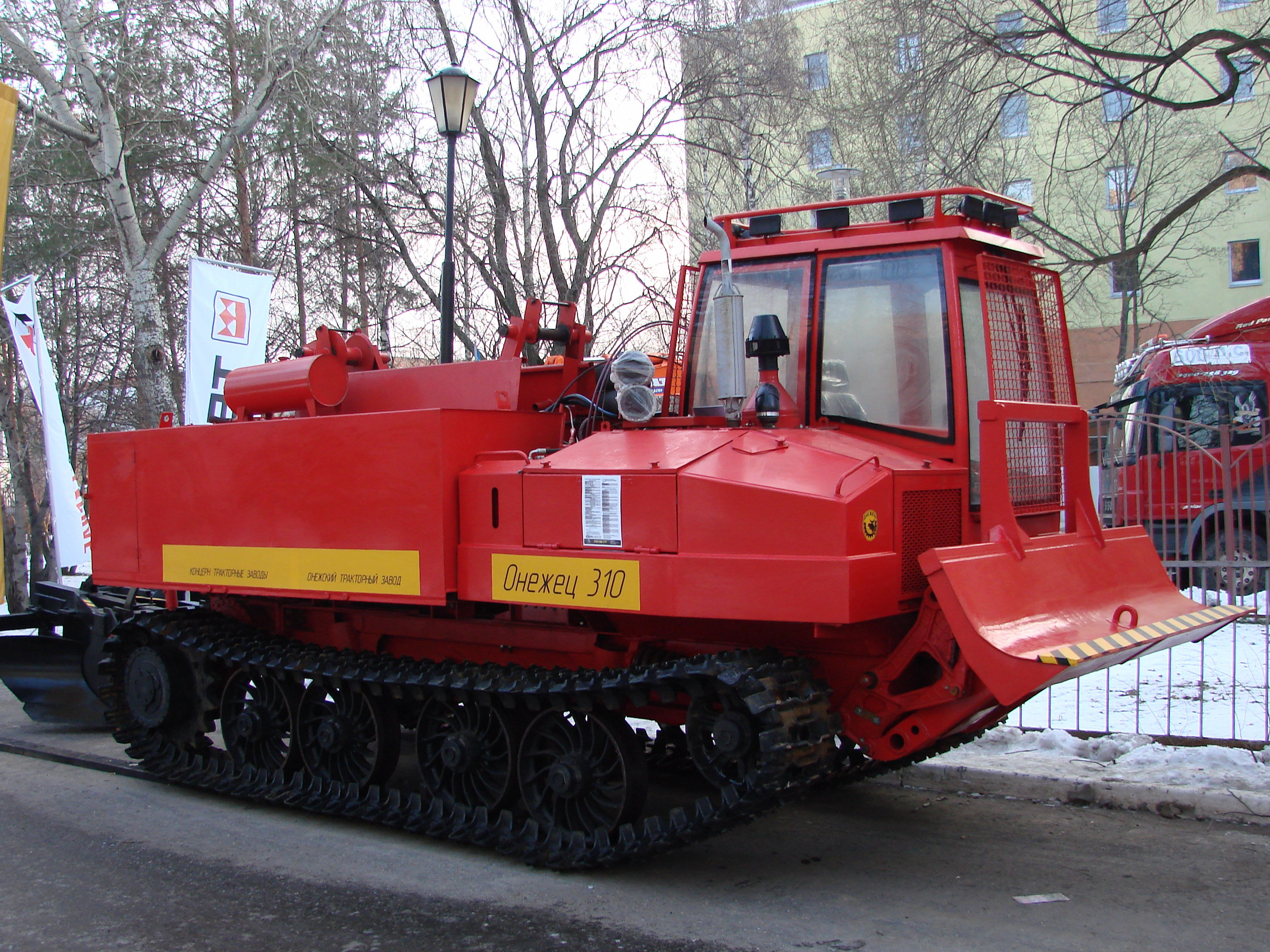
Onegec 310 Firefighting vehicle

=== Other Tractor manufacturers ===
Name	Location	Year Established	Parent company	Types of tractors	Models of tractors
Peterburg Tractor Plant	Saint Petersburg	1801	Kirov Plant company	heavy agricultural tractors, wheel dozers, wheel loaders, industrial tractors	Kirovets K-744, Kirovets K-9000, Kirovets K-702, Kirovets K-703
Chelyabinsk Tractor Plant	Chelyabinsk	1933	Uralvagonzavod corporation	industrial tractors, bulldozers, tractor pipelaying, trenchers based crawler tractors	T10M, B10M, B11, B12, B14, DET-250M2, DET-320, DET-400, T-800, TR20.22.01, TR12.22.01
Alpha-Technic	Oryol	1990-s		wheeled tractor universal high-power tractors based on the Kharkiv Tractor Plant	OrTZ-150K
Agrotechmash	Saint Petersburg, Tambov (plant)	1997		wheeled tractors, wheeled bulldozers	Terrion ATM 3180M, Terrion ATM 4200, Terrion ATM 5280, Terrion ATM 7360
Cherepovets Casting-Mechanical Plant (ChLMZ)	Cherepovets	1950		wheeled tractors under license Minsk Tractor Works; bulldozers, loaders based on tractors	Belarus 320Ch, Belarus 92P-Ch
Kama Tractor Plant (KamTZ)	Naberezhnye Chelny	2012	joint venture ETcorp (Russia, Moscow) and ARGO SpA (Italy)	Agricultural wheeled tractors	TTH-186, TTH-215, TTH-230
CNH-Kamaz Commerce	Naberezhnye Chelny	2010	joint venture CNH Industrial and Kamaz	wheel agricultural tractors	New Holland Agriculture
Zavod Specmashine "Baltietz"	Saint Petersburg	2003		heavy agricultural tractors, truck tractors, loaders and forklifts based tractors, wheel dozers, bulldozer-excavator road machines, snow machines, skidders, timber stackers	K-707T Baltietz, K-703 Baltietz, K-702M Baltietz

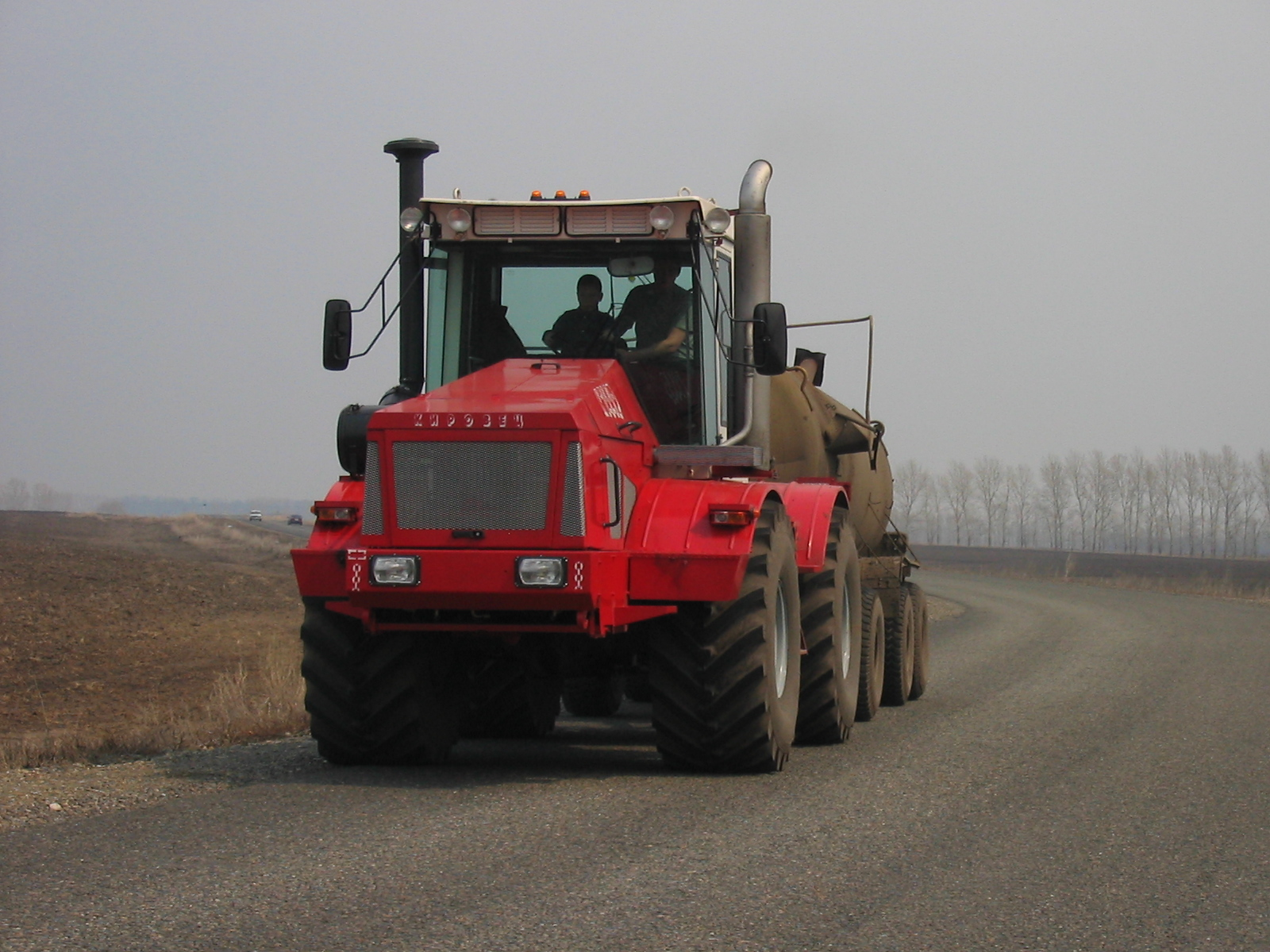
Kirovets K-744

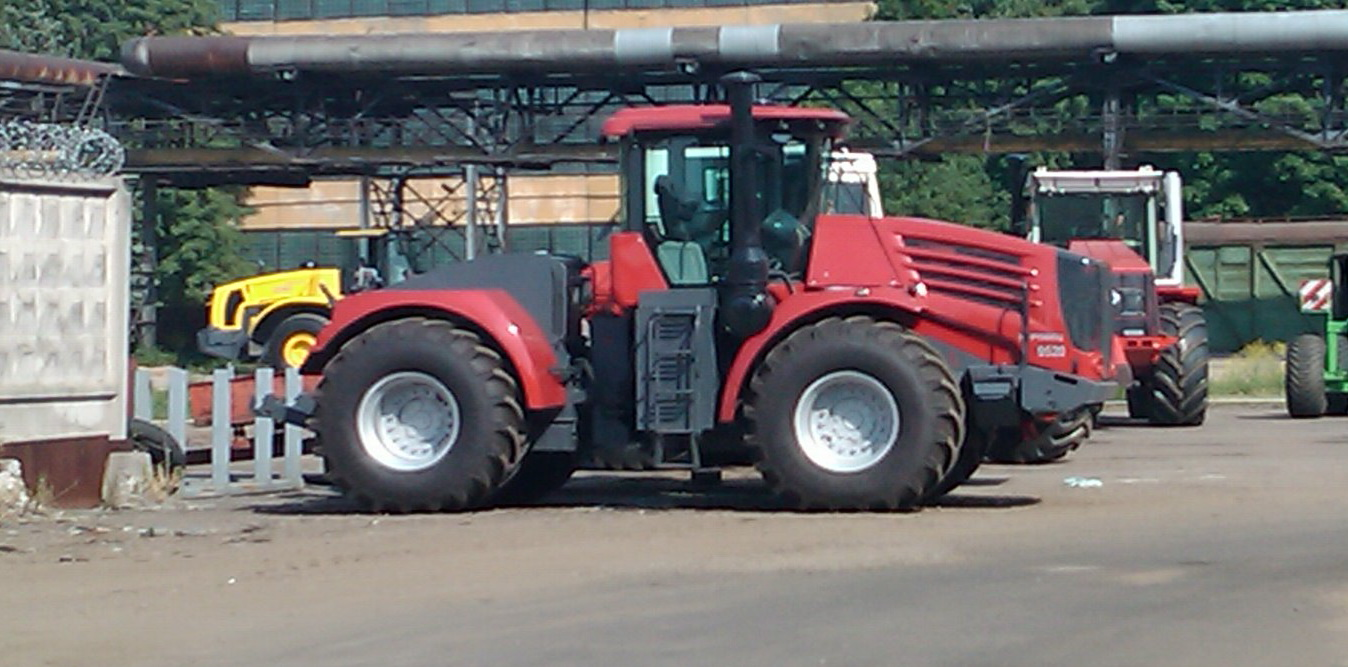
Kirovets K9250

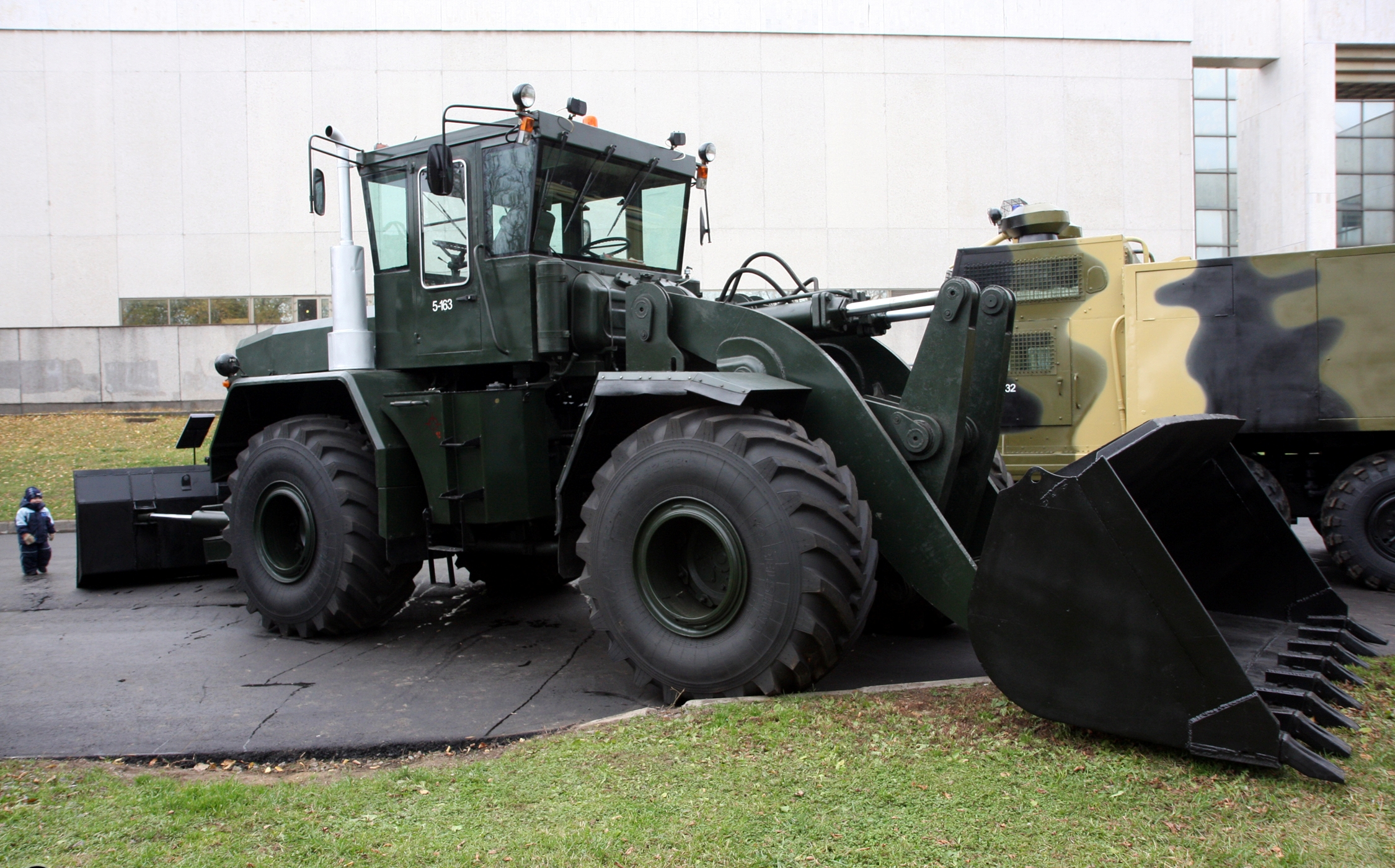
Road bulldozer Kirovets K-702 MV UDM 2

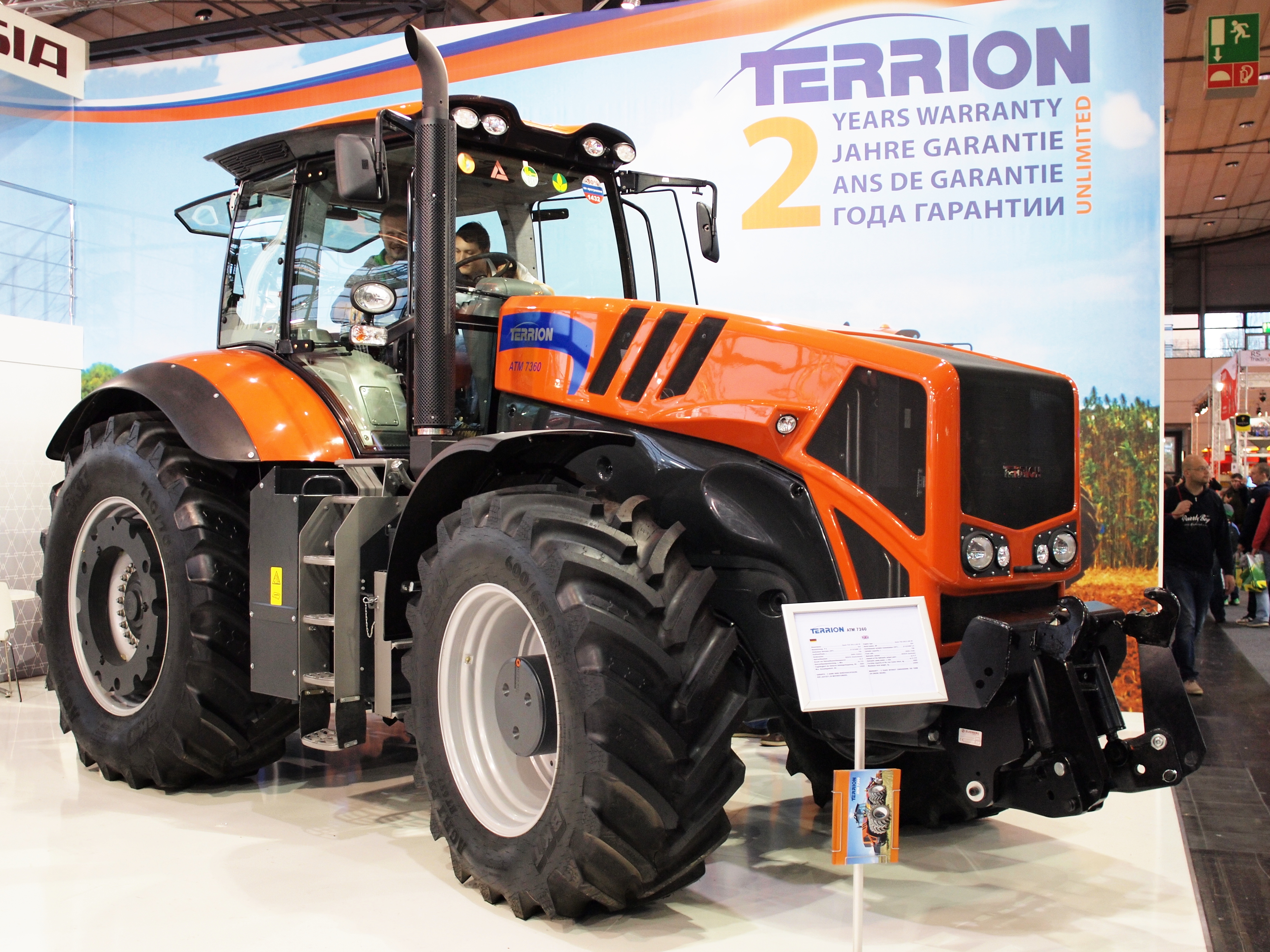
Terrion ATM 7360

=== Foreign Manufacturers ===
Name of company	Location	Year established	Types of tractors	Models of tractors
John Deere	Domodedovo	2010	Conventional Tractors	
Claas	Krasnodar	2005	Conventional Tractors	Claas Axion 820/850/ 920/930/940/950, Claas Xerion 4000/ 4500/5000

=== Russian Combine Manufacturers ===
Name	Location	Year Established	Types of combines	Models of combines
Rostselmash	Rostov-on-Don	1929	Grain and Forage Harvesters	
Cherepovets Casting-Mechanical Plant	Cherepovets	1950	Trailed flax pullers	
Agrotechmash	Saint Petersburg, Tambov (plant)	1997	Conventional Combine Harvesters	SR200 series, SR3000 series, SR3085 Superior series

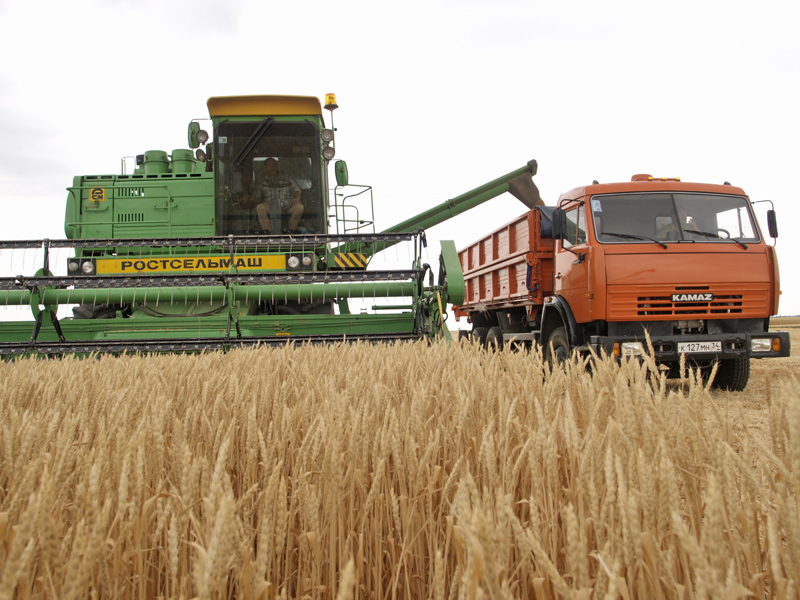
Harvesting in Volgograd Oblast. Harvester Don-1500

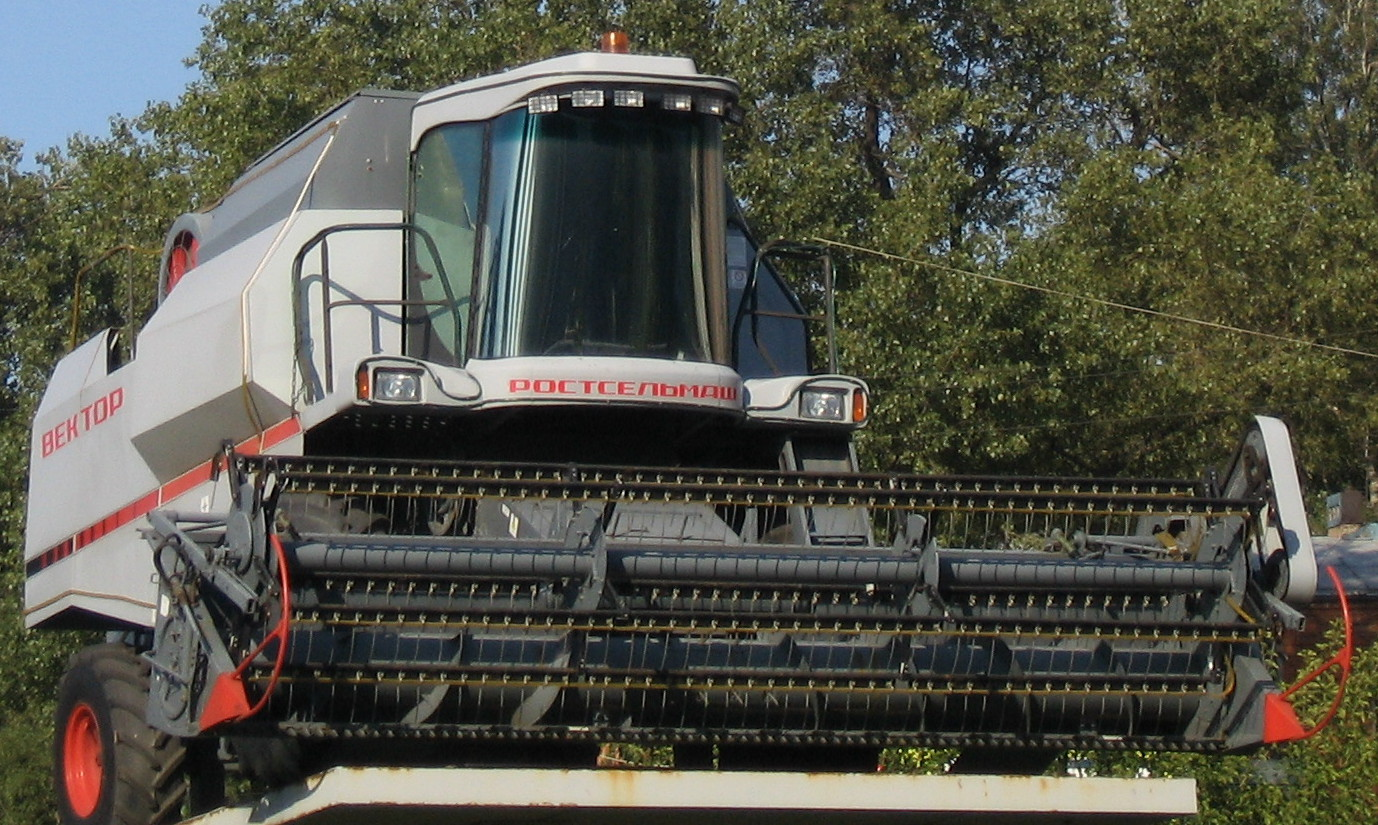
Rostselmash Vector

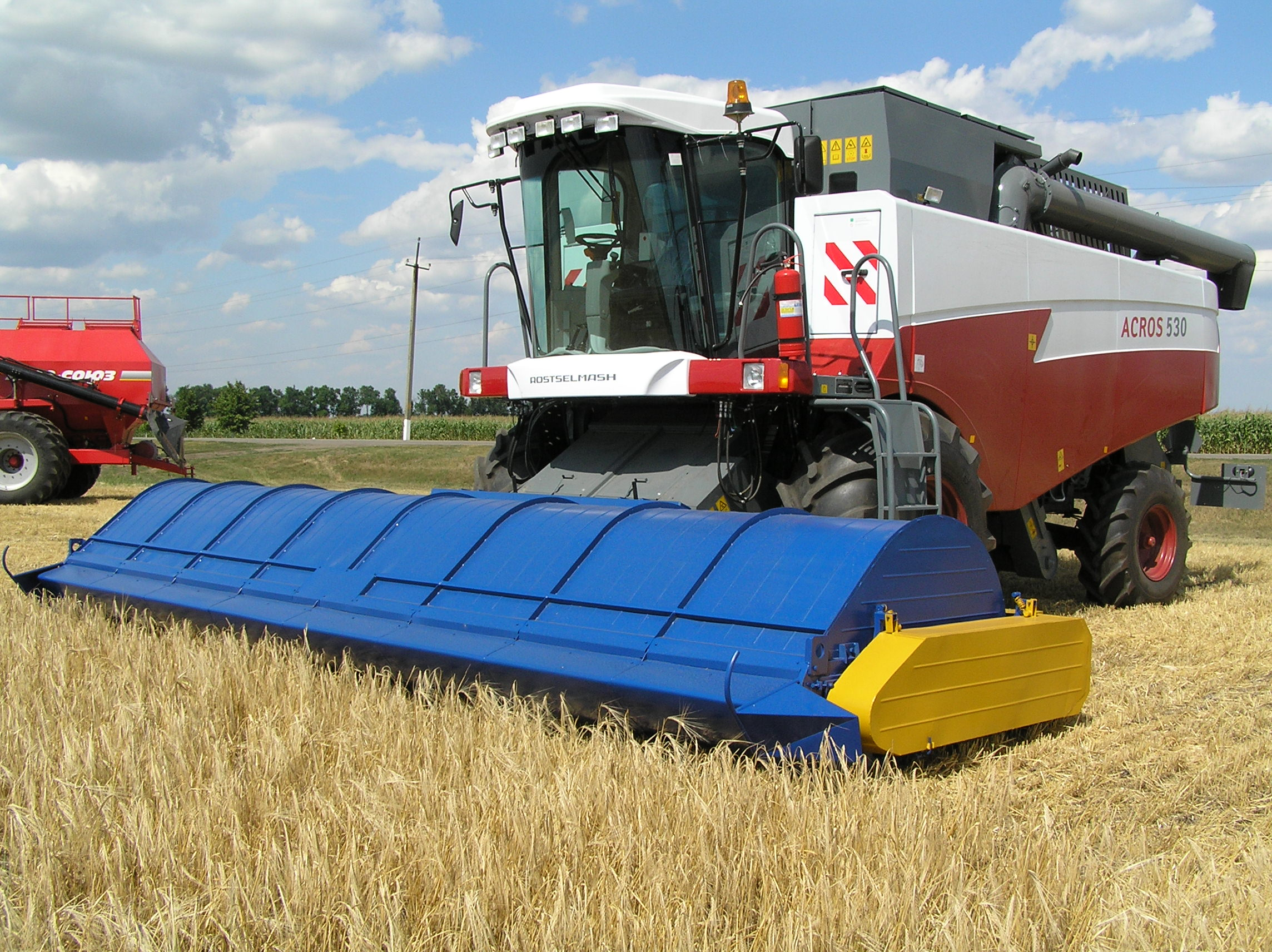
Rostselmash Acros 530

== See also ==
- Forestry in Russia
- Agriculture in Russia
- Agriculture in the Soviet Union

== Links ==
- The official website for Concern "Tractor plants"
- Official site of the Russian Association of Agricultural Machinery
- Official website of the Association of Test agricultural machinery and technology (AIST)
- Official website of the Association of Timber Engineering Roslesmash
- Beiye specialize in the supply mid range tractors
