= Agriculture in Russia =

Development of agricultural output of Russia in 2015 US$ since 1961

Russian Federation in 2017: High concentration of farmland used for growing crops (mainly wheat, maize, sugarbeet, and sunflowers), as well as intensive animal farming. The area between Moscow and Saint Petersburg mostly grows potatoes, rye, oats, and flax. The taiga belt (concentrated in Siberia, the Far East, and the North) is mostly forested, with widespread permafrost and little agriculture. The tundra belt is marked by extensive farming.

Agriculture in Russia is an important part of the economy of the Russian Federation. The agricultural sector survived a severe transition decline in the early 1990s as it struggled to transform from a planned economy to a market-oriented system. Following the breakup of the Soviet Union in 1991, large collective and state farms – the backbone of Soviet agriculture – had to contend with the sudden loss of state-guaranteed marketing and supply channels and a changing legal environment that created pressure for reorganization and restructuring. In less than ten years, livestock inventories declined by half, pulling down demand for feed grains, and the area planted to grains dropped by 25%.

The use of mineral fertilizer and other purchased inputs plummeted, driving yields down. Most farms could no longer afford to purchase new machinery and other capital investments. Following a nearly ten-year period of decline, Russian agriculture has experienced gradual ongoing improvement. The 2014 devaluation of the rouble and imposition of sanctions spurred domestic production; in 2016, Russia exceeded Soviet Russia's grain production levels, and in that year became the world's largest exporter of wheat. In recent years, Russia once again emerged as a big agricultural power, despite also facing various challenges.

Geopolitical analyses of climate change adaptation foresee large opportunities for Russian agriculture during the rest of the 21st century as Siberia's arability increases. Managing migration flows, internal and international, is expected to be a central aspect of the process.

== Production statistics overview ==
As of 2024, the Russian Federation is the worlds largest producer of sugar beet, barley, sunflower seeds, dry peas, buckwheat, and currants.

In addition to smaller productions of other agricultural products, production statistics in 2024 include the following:

Major crop production in Russia (recent most available statistics)
Crop	Production (tons)	World rank	Leading producers
Wheat	82,588,000	3rd	China, India
Sugar beet	46,680,177	1st	---
Potatoes	18,448,001	5th	Multiple countries
Barley	16,667,000	1st	---
Sunflower seeds	17,200,000	1st	---
Maize (corn)	13,954,000	11th	Multiple countries
Oats	3,000,000	2nd	Canada
Tomatoes	2,949,455	12th	Multiple countries
Cabbages	2,623,671	3rd	China, India
Dry peas	3,251,858	1st	---
Rye	1,200,000	3rd	Germany, Poland
Apples	2,014,406	8th	Multiple countries
Cucumbers	1,693,492	4th	China, India, Turkey
Onions	1,667,525	16th	Multiple countries
Carrots	1,383,155	4th	China, Uzbekistan, India
Pumpkins	1,163,235	4th	India, China, Egypt
Buckwheat	979,962	1st	---
Flax	24,100	5th	Multiple countries
Chickpeas	414,127	6th	Multiple countries
Currants	509,945	1st	---
Cherries	53,442	11th	Multiple countries
Lentils	239,886	7th	Multiple countries
Soy	7,000,000	8th	Multiple countries
Watermelons	1,935,891	6th	Multiple countries
Grapes	823,136	20th	Multiple countries

== Climate ==
Russia experiences extreme temperatures in winter and summer, and summer precipitation is low. Many regions of Russia experience six months of snow cover each year and in these places the subsoil can often be frozen permanently. The most fertile regions are in the southern parts of the country between Kazakhstan and Ukraine called chernozem ("black earth") in Russian. Just over 7% of the country's total land is arable, 60% of which is used for cropland and the remainder for pasture.

Geopolitical analyses of climate change adaptation foresee large opportunities for Russian agriculture during the rest of the 21st century as Siberia's arability increases. Managing migration flows, internal and international, is expected to be a central aspect of the process.

== Reduction of arable land ==
The changes that began at the end of the 20th century greatly affected agriculture. Agricultural production has been sharply reduced; and there was a significant reduction in arable land in a number of regions.

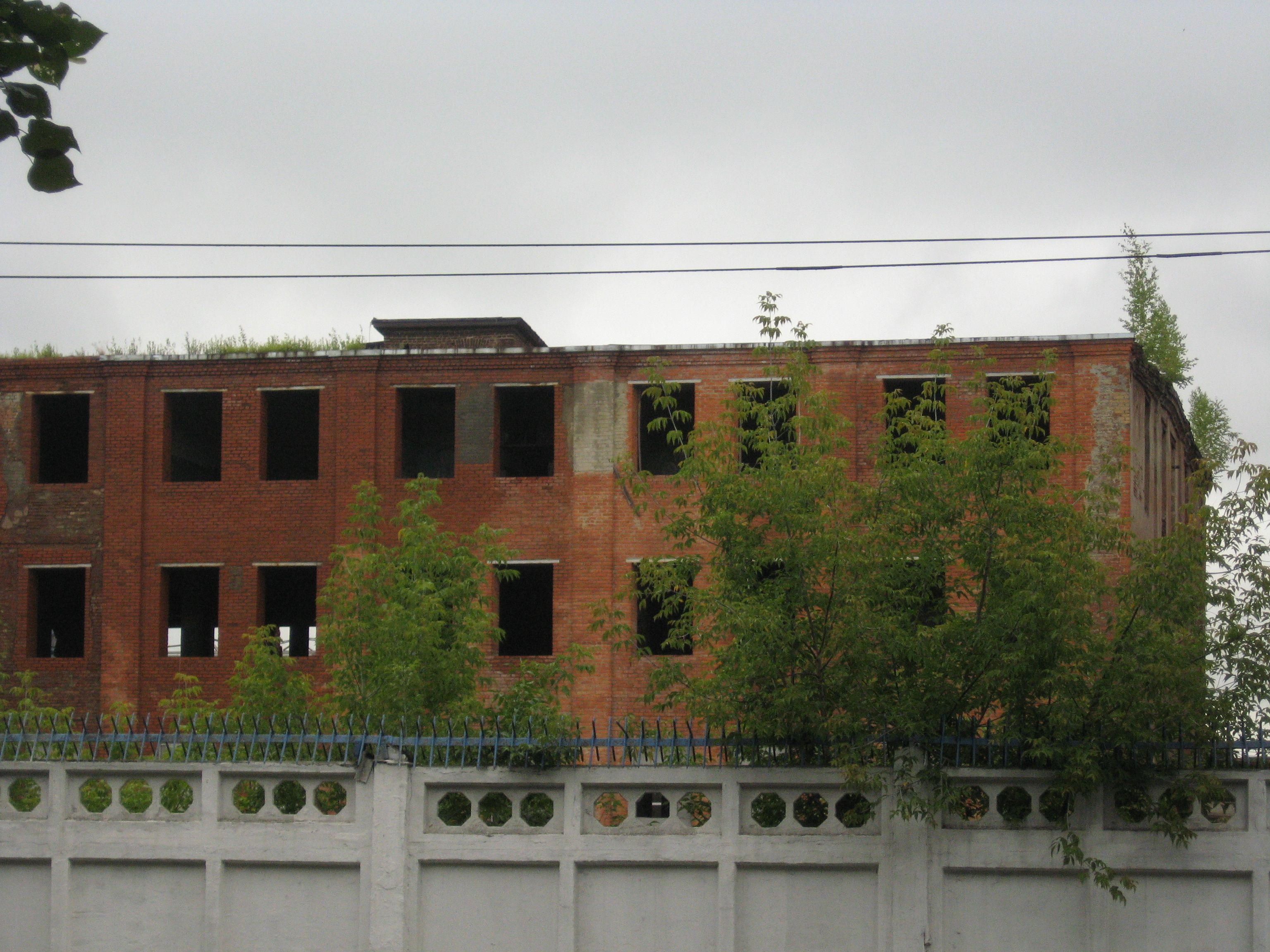
Farming machinery plant (Moscow region, July 2019)

Data on subjects of the Russian Federation:

Arable land in the regions, thousands of hectares
Federal subjects of Russia	1959	1990	1995	2000	2005	2010	2015	Decline from 1990 to 2015, times
Tuva	328	282	194.2	44.2	38.4	27.8	27.2	10.37
Murmansk Oblast	6	24.8	16	14.9	12.1	7.8	7.1	7.7
Zabaykalsky Krai	1698	1542.9	746.8	339.6	278.8	217.2	208.2	7.41
Magadan Oblast	5	36.5	22.7	11.7	6.8	6.1	6.5	5.62
Buryatia	846	767.8	551.1	361.6	221.8	192.8	154	4.99
Astrakhan Oblast	169	324	218.5	96	70	75.5	76.7	4.22
Arkhangelsk Oblast	331	295.1	273.3	215.6	134.5	104.4	77	3.83
Smolensk Oblast	1570	1438.8	1107.1	807.7	547.4	455.8	400.2	3.60
Pskov Oblast	1034	874.7	695.7	575.6	365.3	275.5	245.3	3.57
Kostroma Oblast	771	661.7	576.7	467.2	328.8	207.1	192.0	3.45
Kamchatka Krai	15	64.9	54.8	32.6	18.8	22	20.8	3.12
Tver Oblast	369	1475.2	1223.7	905.1	688.9	633.1	534.4	2.76
Kalmykia	647	726.6	567.5	270.3	275.1	298.8	263.1	2.76
Novgorod Oblast	567	484.8	371.8	280.1	180.6	181.4	178.5	2.72
Kaluga Oblast	1044	918.9	754.3	535.1	370.7	302.1	338.4	2.72
Ivanovo Oblast	660	609.2	528.2	407.3	256.9	219.2	231.3	2.63
Republic of Karelia	67	82.8	77.3	66.5	46.9	38.4	32.5	2.55
Kirov Oblast	2810	2193.9	1838.1	1626.9	1207.9	853	862.8	2.54
Komi Republic	101	100.5	99.6	83.2	52.7	40.5	40.7	2.47
Perm Krai	2118	1850.3	1501.9	1289	999.5	795.2	757.2	2.44
Yaroslavl Oblast	848	768.9	671	570.6	442.3	337.3	315.0	2.44
Irkutsk Oblast	1636	1573.2	1398.4	1020.9	715.4	639	675.3	2.33
Vologda Oblast	906	815.1	757.3	702.3	541.6	451.8	372.4	2.19
Moscow Oblast	1249	1224.1	1096.4	977.9	699.4	550.7	579.1	2.11
Mari El	656	603	585.6	500.5	400.8	299.5	292.4	2.06
Ryazan Oblast	1938	1687	1407.3	994.2	808.2	771.1	858.8	1.96
Vladimir Oblast	688	643.6	553.4	485	409.1	331.2	329.2	1.96
Leningrad Oblast	357	436.4	402.7	386.7	293.3	250.5	229.9	1.90
Sakhalin Oblast	34	50	46.6	36.7	23.9	25.4	26.5	1.89
Kurgan Oblast	3026	2640.3	2094.8	1675.9	1203.7	1373.9	1393.4	1.89
Krasnoyarsk Krai	3927	2879.1	2507.6	1926.4	1608	1461.1	1538.1	1.87
Tula Oblast	1683	1448	1295.5	912.8	739.6	749.5	780.8	1.85
Tomsk Oblast	583	622.9	549.2	488.4	388.4	381.3	339.9	1.83
Nizhny Novgorod Oblast	2367	2055.5	1716.4	1494.6	1186.8	1165.1	1125.0	1.83
Primorsky Krai	626	741.6	564.5	448.1	340.1	314	413.7	1.79
Sverdlovsk Oblast	1521	1516.3	1334.1	1175.1	959.6	851.9	866.4	1.75
Penza Oblast	2630	2229.6	1945.3	1258.2	1169.1	1304.1	1304.1	1.71
Kaliningrad Oblast	369	416.3	349.6	262.1	217.9	148.1	245.5	1.70
Ulyanovsk Oblast	1869	1643.8	1567.4	1127.7	769.6	950.2	1010.2	1.63
Bryansk Oblast	1413	1292	1169.6	865.8	654.8	671.6	826.1	1.56
Volgograd Oblast	5303	4619.1	3992.1	2610.2	2979.3	2726.2	2988.0	1.55
Khabarovsk Krai	194	121.3	109.6	102.6	77.3	72.6	78.5	1.55
Saratov Oblast	6399	5564.5	4438.4	3955.7	3589.5	3604.6	3730.9	1.49
Tyumen Oblast	1775	1634.3	1296.8	1181.9	990	1091.2	1102.7	1.48
Kemerovo Oblast	1599	1447	1275.6	1141.6	1065.3	1037.1	971.7	1.49
Novosibirsk Oblast	4123	3442.9	3049.2	2718.8	2536.6	2326.2	2339.9	1.47
Chelyabinsk Oblast	3086	2694.3	2431.8	1994.7	1844.0	2074.4	1834.9	1.47
Bashkortostan	4886	4399.3	4245.8	3744.3	3048	3146.9	3060.6	1.44
Amur Oblast	1486	1623.5	1082.1	659.5	576.4	790.3	1165.1	1.39
Chuvashia	874	799.9	770.6	693.1	551.3	571.9	574.7	1.39
Udmurtia	1620	1400.8	1271.5	1152	1153.8	1067.2	1028.9	1.36
Karachay-Cherkessia	-	192.3	155.2	142	117.6	121.9	141.9	1.36
Altai Republic	-	146.5	132.1	106.6	103.4	103.3	108.3	1.35
Orenburg Oblast	6200	5569	4894.1	4454.1	3840.2	4051.4	4196.3	1.33
Samara Oblast	3166	2678.5	2414.8	1968.5	1874.2	1834	2016.7	1.33
Oryol Oblast	1768	1568.5	1369.5	1201.5	1079.9	1076.5	1212.6	1.29
Ingushetia	-	-	85.3	56.7	53.3	62.7	67.5	1.26
Dagestan	511	435.2	359.6	307.3	319.3	271	344.8	1.26
Omsk Oblast	4384	3745	3463.2	2964.8	2911.8	2797.5	3029.4	1.24
Altai Krai	7669	6380	5832.6	5344.9	5191.3	5149.3	5393.0	1.18
Rostov Oblast	5937	5224	4621.7	3858.1	4180.1	4351.4	4467.8	1.17
Kursk Oblast	2117	1855.4	1639.1	1363.4	1197.6	1355.3	1619.3	1.15
Voronezh Oblast	3311	2985.5	2725.3	2319.1	2147.9	2336.6	2590.5	1.15
Lipetsk Oblast	1766	1513	1382.9	1132.1	1050	1214.4	1324.1	1.14
Tatarstan	3886	3402.4	3337.7	2991.4	2897.1	2927.8	3000.9	1.13
Kabardino-Balkaria	329	325.3	316.8	308.7	290.9	291.1	289.6	1.12
Tambov Oblast	2437	2068.3	1766.9	1360.3	1282.1	1426.7	1757.1	1.18
North Ossetia–Alania	201	205.8	192.5	177.3	150.6	160.6	175.9	1.17
Adygea	-	269.7	233.7	217.3	184.1	228.9	236.7	1.14
Stavropol Krai	4207	3433.9	3268.9	2851.6	2736.8	2890.5	3051.9	1.13
Belgorod Oblast	1762	1586.2	1498.9	1416.2	1287.5	1248.5	1449.3	1.09
Krasnodar Krai	4306	3902.6	3747.8	3669.5	3531.7	3634.4	3679.0	1.06
Chechnya	-	-	-	-	163.8	189	220.0	0.75

Farmers are dissatisfied with the poor working and living conditions. The number of rural settlements is constantly decreasing due to poor conditions. For example, 721 villages died out (from 18101 to 17380) in 2 years (from 1 January 2017 to 1 January 2019). Through numerous measures of the government in recent years private farmers became in comparison to the years of the nineties a relevant new pillar in Russian agriculture.

Arable land in RSFSR and in Russian Federation:
year	1940	1945	1950	1970	1990	1995	2000	2005	2010	2015
Thousands km^{2}	920,76	670,61	889,52	1219,12	1177,1	1025,4	854,19	758,37	751,88	793,19

== Ownership and farm structure ==
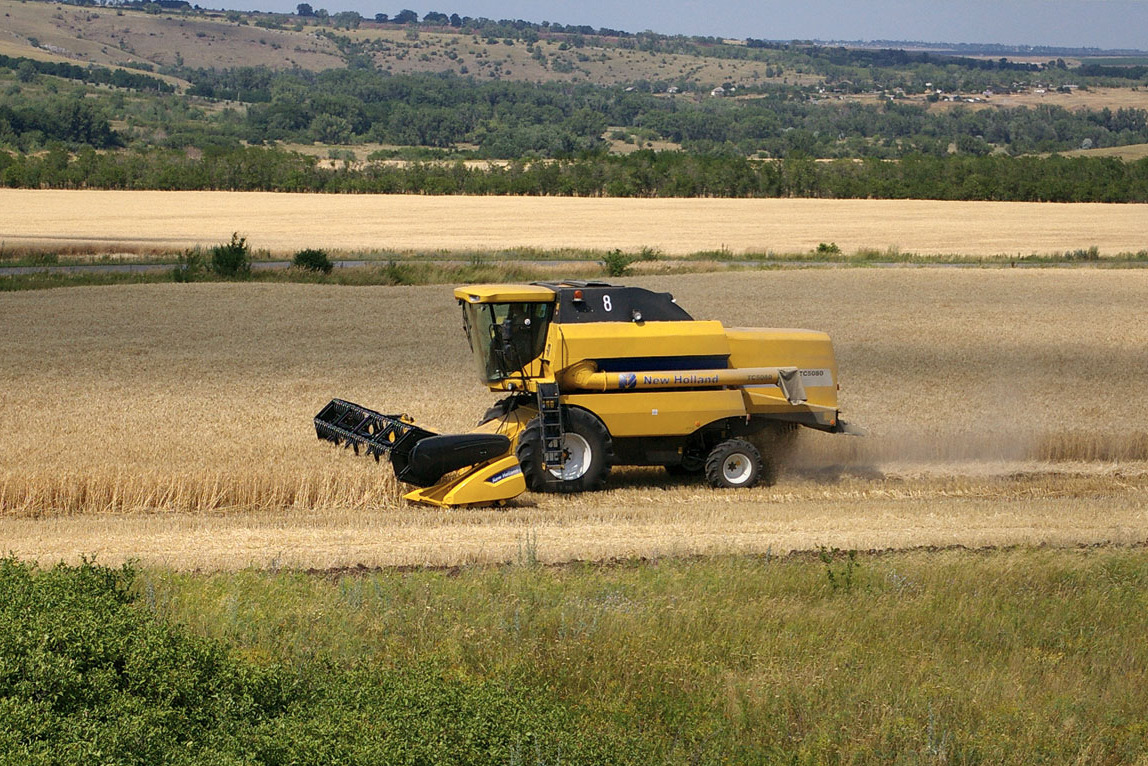
A combine in the Rostov Oblast.

After the Soviet Union collectivised its agricultural sector during the Stalin years and until the 1980s, most agricultural land in Russia was in state ownership, and the transition to a market-oriented economy had to start with privatisation of land and farm assets. Russia's agricultural privatisation programme can be traced back to 1989–90, when Soviet legislation under Gorbachev allowed, first, the creation of non-state business enterprises in the form of cooperatives; and second, legalized private ownership of land by individuals (the November 1990 Law of Land Reform). While household plots cultivated by employees of collective farms and other rural residents had played a key role in Russian agriculture since the 1930s, legislation enabling independent private farms outside the collectivist framework was passed only in November 1990.

The Law on Peasant Farms adopted in December 1990 was followed by laws and decrees that defined the legal organizational forms of large agricultural enterprises, the legal aspects of land ownership, and the procedures for certifying and exercising ownership rights. Specifically, agricultural land was denationalized, and its ownership (together with the ownership of other farm assets) legally transferred from the state to the ownership of kolkhozes. But at the same time the government imposed a ten-year moratorium on buying and selling privately owned land.

The new legal environment created expectations among Western scholars and Russian reform-advocates that family farms would emerge in large numbers and the large-scale collective farms would be restructured. But as it turned out, few peasants were interested in establishing individual farms, and management- and operating-practices inside large agricultural enterprises remained largely unchanged despite formal reorganization. O'Brien and Wegren attribute this lack of enthusiasm for the creation of private farms to inadequate rural infrastructure, which did not provide processing and marketing services for small producers, and also to the fear that families striking out on their own might lose eligibility for social services that were traditionally provided by the local corporate farm instead of the municipality.

Starting in 1993, privatized kolkhoz and sovkhoz units became corporate farms. These farms were legally reorganized as common-stock companies, limited-liability partnerships, or agricultural-production cooperatives and were turned over, usually in their entirety, to the joint ownership of agricultural workers and pensioners. These farms continued to operate largely as they had done under the Soviet system. Today, the term "corporate farm" is an all-inclusive phrase describing the various organizational forms that arose in the process of privatisation without involving distribution of physical parcels of land to individuals.

In diametric opposition to corporate farms is the individual farm sector, which consists of the traditional household plots and the newly formed peasant farms.

The land-code reform of 2002, advanced by the administration of President Vladimir Putin, called for the ownership of real-estate objects to henceforth follow ownership of the attached land plot; granted exclusive right to purchase or lease state-owned land to the owner of the attached real-estate object; gave to private owners of buildings on land plots owned by other private parties the preemptive right to purchase the land; and prohibited the future privatization of real-estate objects without the concurrent privatization of the attached plot.

Russian agriculture today is characterized by three main types of farms. Two of these farm types – corporate farms and household plots – existed all through the Soviet period (the former are basically the successors of the Soviet collective (kolkhoz) and state (sovkhoz) farms). The third type – peasant farms – began to re-emerge only after 1990, during the post-Soviet transition. The evolution of Russian agriculture since 1990 shows a significant change of resources and production from the formerly dominant corporate farms to the individual farming sector. During 2006, household plots and peasant farms combined controlled about 20% of agricultural land and 48% of cattle, up from 2% of agricultural land and 17% of cattle in 1990. The share of the individual sector in gross agricultural output increased from 26% in 1990 to 59% in 2005. Producing 59% of agricultural output on 20% of land, individual farms achieve a much greater productivity than corporate farms.

Shares of agricultural land, cattle headcount, and gross agricultural output
for farms of different types (in percent of respective totals)

Indicator	Farm type	1990	1995	2000	2005	2013
Agricultural land	Corporate farms	98	90	87	80	61
	Household plots	2	5	6	10	26
	Peasant farms	0	5	7	10	12
Cattle	Corporate farms	83	70	60	52	
	Household plots	17	29	38	44	
	Peasant farms	0	1	2	4	
Agricultural production	Corporate farms	74	50	43	41	
	Household plots	26	48	54	53	
	Peasant farms	0	2	3	6	

During 2004, peasant farms accounted for 14.4% of Russia's total grain production (up from 6.2% in 1997), 21.8% percent of sunflower seed (up from 10.8% five years earlier), and 10.1% of sugar beets (3.5% in 1997). Corporate farms produced the remainder of these crops, with hardly any contribution from the small household plots. However, household plots, with a maximum size of 2 hectares (4.9 acres), produced 93% percent of the country's potatoes and 80% of the vegetables, either for family consumption or for sale in the local markets. They also produced 51% of the milk and 54% of the meat in 2003, with the rest coming primarily from corporate farms (the contribution of peasant farms to livestock production was negligible).

=== Household plots ===
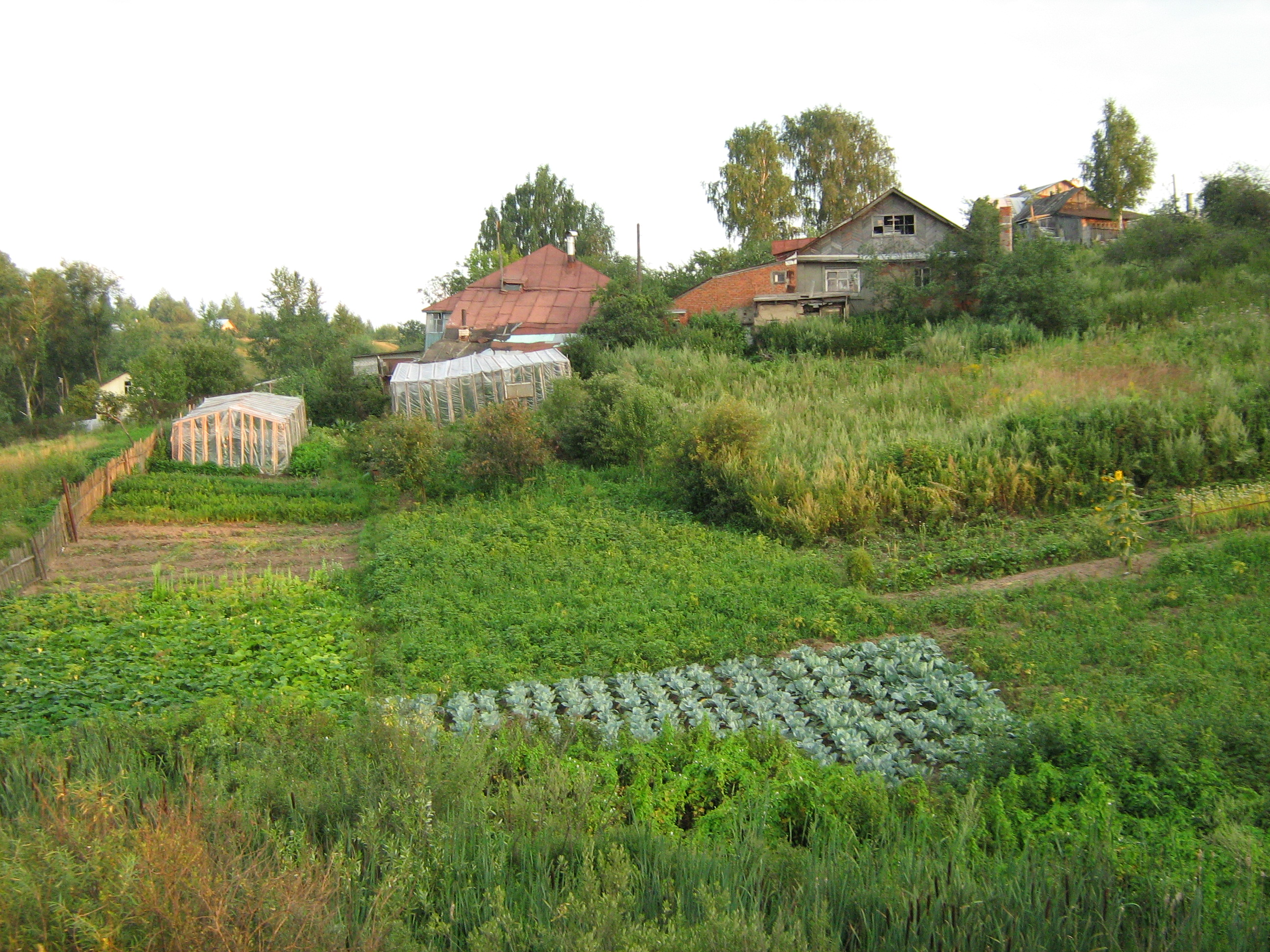
A typical household plot in Fedyakovo, near Nizhny Novgorod

As the household plots gained more land in the process of reform, their share in Russia's agricultural production increased from 26% of aggregate value in 1990 to 53% in 2005. According to a survey conducted in three Russian villages, the increase in land holdings and farm production tripled the nominal family income from 512 rubles per month in 1997 to 1,525 rubles per month in 1999 (this includes both cash income and the value of food that the family consumed from its household plot). The change in family income outstripped inflation, increasing by 18% in real terms (the Consumer Price Index grew by 252% between 1997 and 1999). This real growth in family income reduced the percentage of rural households living in poverty from 29% in 1997 to 17% in 1999.

== Planting and harvest dates ==
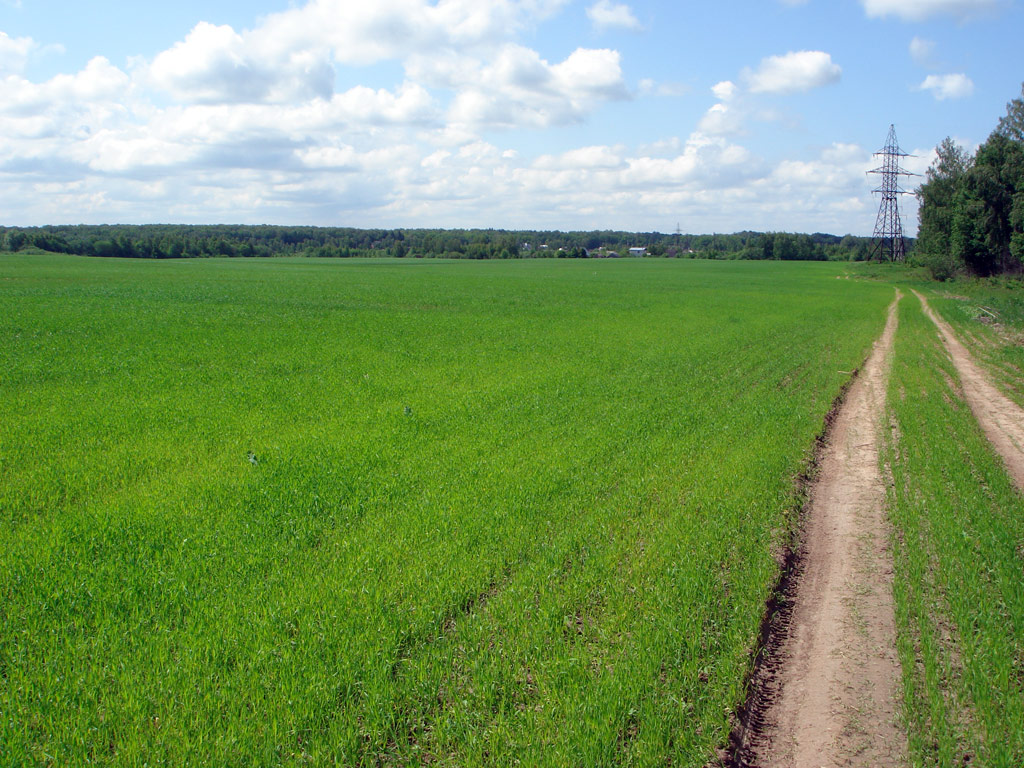
Young wheat just coming up in June in a field near Nizhny Novgorod

The winter-crop planting season stretches over nearly three months. The sowing campaign begins in August in the north and advances southward, concluding in late October in the Southern provinces. Spring grain planting in European Russia usually begins in April and progresses from south to north. The "summer" crops—chiefly maize (corn) and sunflowers—are last to be sown, and planting approaches completion by late May or early June. The harvest of small grains (chiefly wheat and barley) moves from south to north and begins in late June in extreme southern Russia. Harvest operations are in full swing by early July and largely finished by mid-to-late August. Maize and sunflower harvest begins in September and continues through October. (View regional crop calendars.)

In the spring wheat region, planting typically begins in May. Oats are sown first, followed by wheat, then barley. Planting is concluded by June. Spring wheat advances through the reproductive stage during mid-July, when temperatures climb to their highest levels and grains are most vulnerable to heat stress. Grain harvest begins in late August and continues through October. It is not unusual for a significant portion of the Russian grain crop—millions of hectares in some years—to remain unharvested, due chiefly to unfavorable weather during the harvest campaign. In an average year, 10 percent of the area planted to spring wheat is abandoned compared to 97 percent of the country's winter wheat area.

== Sectors - historical ==
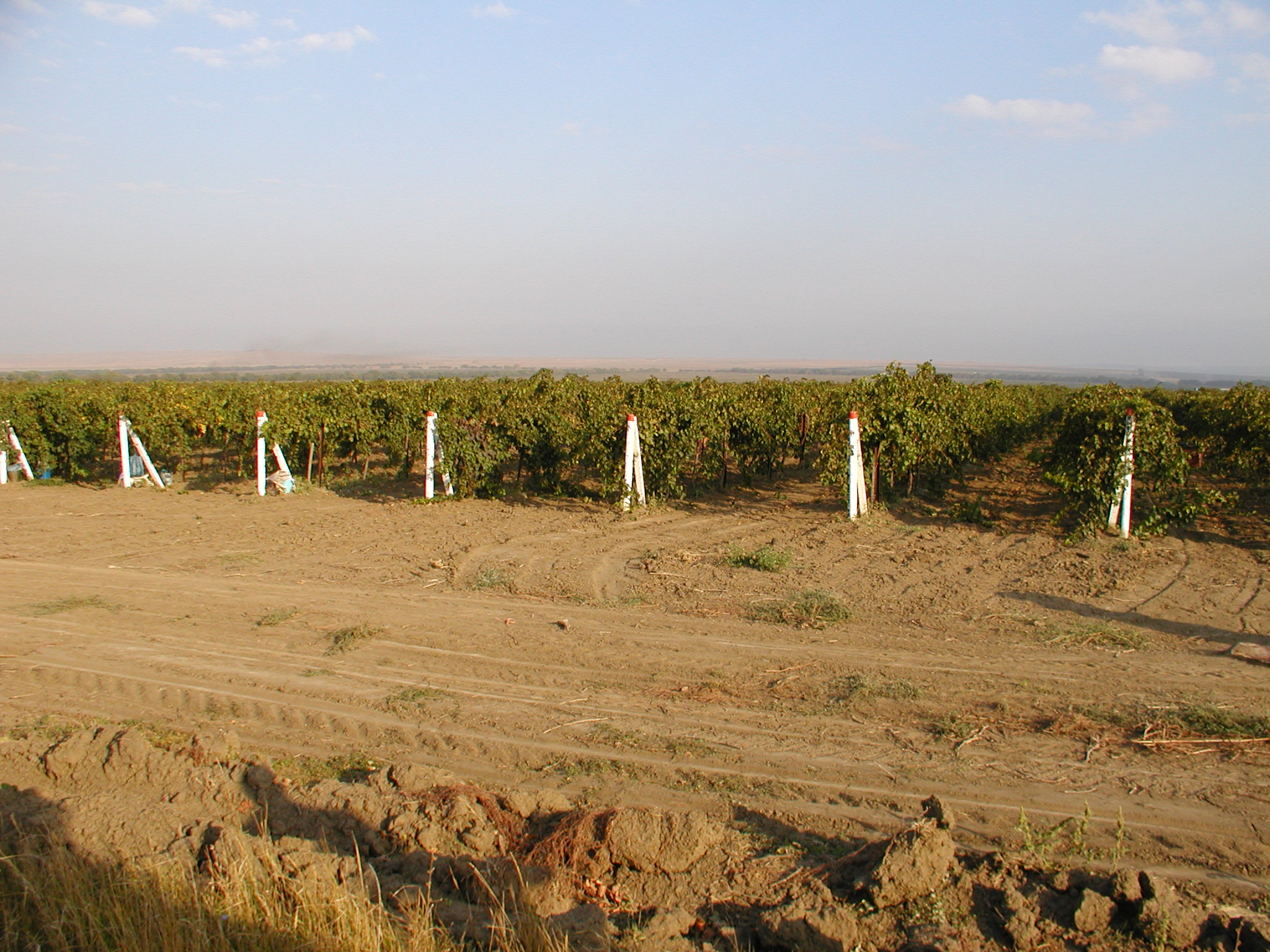
Vineyard with grapes Cabernet Sauvignon on the Taman Peninsula, Krasnodar Krai

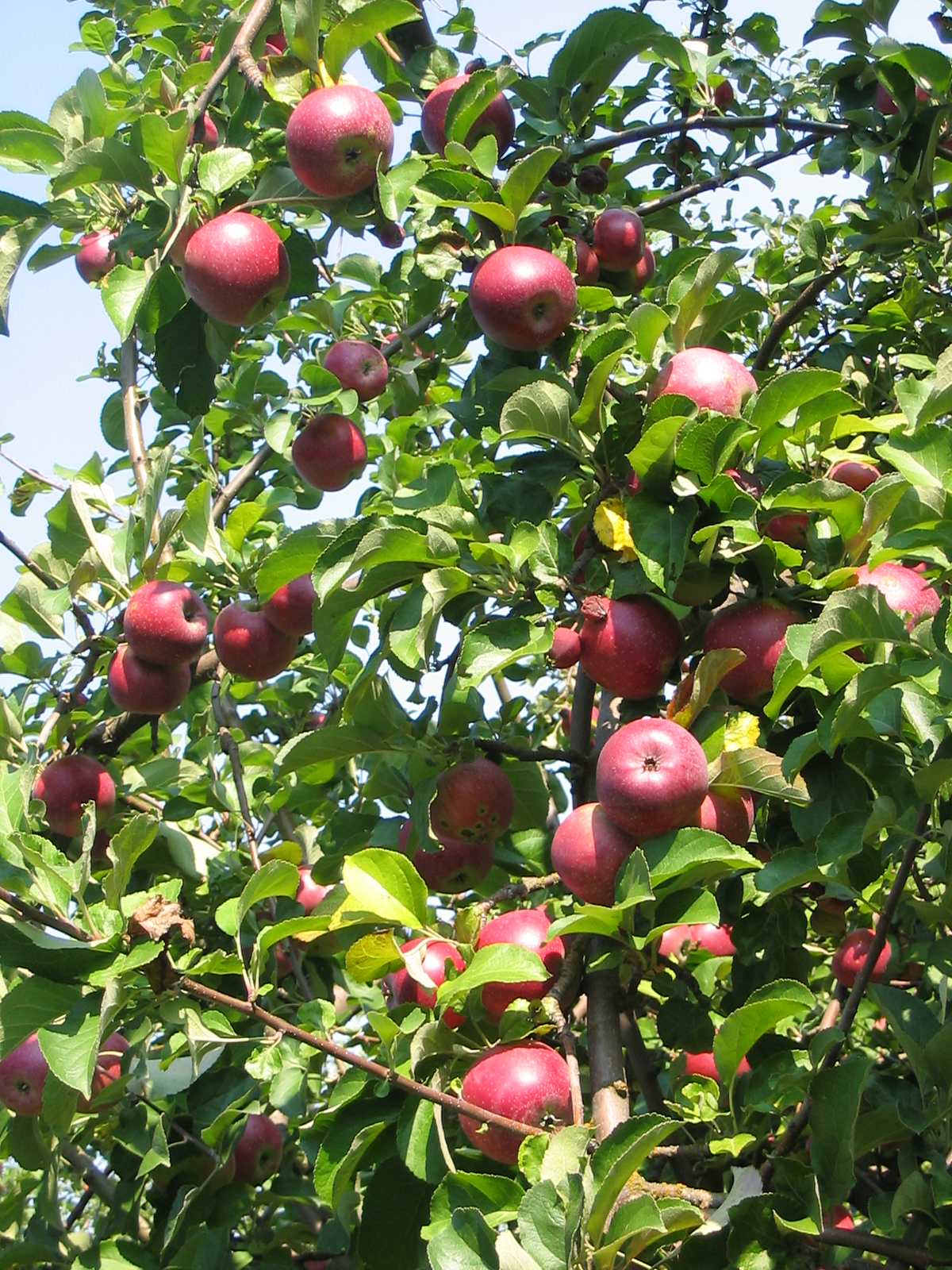
Apple orchard in Korochansky District, Belgorod Oblast

=== Grain ===
In 2016, Russia gained and exceeded Soviet grain production levels, and in that year became the world's largest exporter of wheat.

==== Exports ====
The Russian grain export is the foreign trade operations for the sale of grain, primarily wheat grain, from Russia to other countries. Grain has been a traditional item of export income for Russia for centuries, providing the Russian Federation in the 21st century with leadership among the main grain suppliers to the world market along with the EU (2nd place 2019/20), United States (3rd place), Canada (4th place), Ukraine (5th place).

== Farm credit ==
While agricultural policy in Russia had been poorly structured and largely unsuccessful, some basic trends have helped to create forces for change. The first is that state tax revenues have been falling, and hence the spending capacity for agricultural policy has been falling. Total federal transfers to agriculture fell from 10% to 4% of GDP from 1992 to 1993, and budgeted transfers for 1994 are about 5% of GDP.

There has been improvement in the agricultural credit situation in Russia over the past five years – for some farms, at least – due largely to subsidies from the federal government. The national project for agriculture has given impetus to the growth of small farms. During 2006, 36 billion rubles in credit were given to more than 100,000 recipients (as compared to 3.4 billion rubles in credit to 2,500 borrowers in 2005). Traditional farms and personal plots play an important role in the sector, providing more than 87 percent of all production.

The State offers in-kind credits, whereby seed, fertilizer, and other inputs are provided in exchange for grain harvested at the end of the season, though the use of in-kind credit is reportedly decreasing. The government also provides subsidies for the purchase of plant-protection chemicals and fertilizers, and subsidizes two-thirds of the interest rate on loans from commercial banks, which provide the majority of farm credit. Banks remain cautious and insist on certain farm management practices and minimum levels of input use before granting loans (a policy which, according to some observers, has had a significant positive effect on overall efficiency in the agricultural sector), but banks' confidence is boosted by increasingly reliable guarantees from regional administrations who see stability of food production as a high priority. Banks recognize the inherent risk in agricultural financing but also see agriculture as less risky than other industries and are generally willing to lend money to solvent, well-managed farms.

Over fifty percent of Russia's farms, however, are already saddled with considerable debt, due in part to the disparity between grain prices and production costs, and few farms are able to offer sufficient collateral to secure a loan. As a result, many farms are forced to rely on outside investors to guarantee loans. These investors, frequently referred to as holding companies, typically are large, cash-rich, traditionally non-agricultural companies that became involved in agriculture over the past five years. Some viewed crop production as a potentially highly profitable venture, and others were working to guarantee raw materials for vertically integrated food-processing operations.

Holding companies possess assets that satisfy banks' demand for collateral, and a farm that receives a commercial loan with the help of a holding company is still eligible for the federal interest subsidy. Many holding companies, particularly those who were attracted to agriculture by the high grain prices during 2000, have lost interest in crop production following two years of low prices and are bailing out. Investments in crop production don't pay off quickly, in contrast to investments in trade. Although some holding companies remain comfortable with the variable profitability of agriculture and will continue to work with farms, several prominent commodity analysts feel that the overall involvement of big companies in agriculture is declining.

This means that current prospects for significant, long-term investment in agriculture – particularly the purchase of agricultural machinery and grain-storage facilities – are somewhat dim. Land reform has been evolving in Russia since the basic right to own farmland was established in 1993, but "landowners" are still unable to use land as collateral in securing a loan. The situation, however, is not one that can be resolved quickly or easily through legislation alone.

There is no mechanism currently in place to enable banks to evaluate the value of land based on its productivity before issuing loans, and banks likely would be reluctant to use land as collateral regardless of legislation. Furthermore, there are restrictions against non-agricultural use of land that is currently used for agriculture: if land is used for other purposes, the owner loses the title to the land. This imposes a limit on the land's "re-sellability," and, in turn, its value. The use of land as collateral appears to be a remote prospect.

== Investments ==
Investments in fixed capital within the agricultural sector were US$10.17 billion in 2010, which is 3.3% of total investments in the national economy of Russia. Most investments occurred in corporate farming, where about 47.2% of the investments were allocated to production buildings and 36.4% in machinery and technological equipments. Financing of investments was shared by own financial means (49%) and by external means (51%).

=== State investment program ===
In December 2006, the State Duma passed a law requiring a state program for investment in agriculture to be passed every five years. This is the first of those programs. Between 2003 and 2007, agriculture received 37.1 billion rubles' support per year.

== Governance and economy of Russian agriculture ==
As non-agricultural sectors grew more rapidly after the collapse of the Soviet Union, the share of agriculture in total GDP in Russia decreased from 14.3% in 1991 to 4% in 2011. The agricultural sector accounted for 6.71% of total employment in 2015.

The importance of Russia's grain exports in the global market, especially related to oilseeds and wheat, meant that during the 2022 Russian invasion of Ukraine sanctions and disruptions to trade from Ukraine caused a significant increase in global grain prices, with some commentators suggesting that the war would precipitate a 2022 food crises.

In 2024, Russian farmers announced plans to reduce wheat cultivation following significant losses earlier in the year. Many farmers intend to shift to more profitable crops, such as peas, lentils, and sunflowers, citing better financial returns and lower risks. This decision reflects broader economic challenges and changing agricultural trends in the region.

== Pests ==
=== Fusaria ===
The Luxembourg Microbial Culture Collection's European Fusarium Database has information on Fusaria found in the country by sample date, species, chemotype, and host (and previous crop if known).

=== Weeds ===
==== Chondrilla juncea ====
Native here, C. juncea is an invasive weed in North America and eastern Australia. A fungus specialised to Chondrilla spp., Puccinia chondrillina, is found throughout C. juncea's native range including here. It is being used as a biocontrol in its introduced range.

== See also ==
- Agriculture in the Soviet Union
- Agriculture in the Russian Empire
- Food industry of Russia
- Tractor, timber and agricultural machinery in Russia
- Fishing industry in Russia
- Economy of Russia
- Service portal of Ministry of Agriculture of the Russian Federation
