= Russian grain exports =

The Russian grain export is the foreign trade operations for the sale of grain, primarily wheat grain, from Russia to other countries. Grain has been a traditional item of export income for Russia for centuries, providing the Russian Federation in the 21st century with leadership among the main grain suppliers to the world market along with the EU (2nd place 2019/20), United States (3rd place), Canada (4th place), Ukraine (5th place).

== Political aspects ==
Historically, Russian wheat exports were preceded by wheat exports from the Black Sea steppes to Ancient Greece and Ancient Rome. The long existence of grain exports in this direction is associated with the peculiarities of the landscape of the Northern Black Sea region, which are extremely favorable for the growth of wheat.

Grain export of Russia for a long time had not only economic, but also significant external and internal political importance for the country. It became the subject of public discussion and political speculation in various historical periods of the country's life. Since wheat has been one of the main Russian export goods for a long time, the proceeds from its sale were often used for cross-financing of other sectors of the economy, primarily industry.

At the same time, the average yield grain in the risky farming zone (80% of the Russian territory) is low: self-three instead of self-six, self-seven in Western and Southern Europe.

Due to the difference in natural and geographical conditions in Eastern Europe, the aggregate of the most necessary needs of an individual was significantly greater than in Western Europe, and the conditions for their satisfaction are much more difficult and worse, noted the author of the book "Great Russian Plowman" L.V. Milov. Therefore, the volume of the surplus product of grain production was always much less, and with the need of landowners to receive incomes comparable to incomes in Western European societies, they obviously gave rise to the catch phrase attributed to the Minister of Finance of the Russian Empire Ivan Vyshnegradsky "we are undernourished, but we will take out!".

== Historical background ==
=== Russian Empire ===
Prior to 1762, the export of Russian grain was limited to the port of Arkhangelsk. Peter III opened grain exports from ports on the Baltic Sea such as St. Petersburg, where grain shipped through internal river waterways were collected for export. Significant expansion in exports occurred in the 1860s and 1870s due to the Emancipation reform of 1861 and the opening of new railways. In some years during the late 19th century, over half of Russia's wheat production were exported. By 1903, Russia had surpassed the United States as the world's largest wheat exporter, and was also a major exporter of oats, barley and rye.

=== Soviet Union ===
During the late 1920s and early 1930s, collectivization policies caused a decline in Russian/Soviet grain production. Regardless, around 12 million tonnes of grain were exported between 1929 and 1933, with the proceeds being used to purchase agricultural machinery. It was a grain exporter again after World War II, averaging around 6 million tonnes of net exports per year between 1956 and 1962. Following a poor harvest in 1963, it became a net importer, and continued to do so until its dissolution due to increasing demand for grain from the Soviet meat industry. International grain trade by the USSR was handled by the state monopoly corporation Exportkhleb.

== Russian Federation grain exports ==
Russian grain production collapsed immediately after the fall of the Soviet Union, with production going down by around one-third. By the early 2000s, however, Russia had once again become a net grain exporter. In 2023–2024, Russia exported 60 million tonnes of grains (mostly wheat), roughly half its total grain production. About two-thirds (55 million out of 83 million tonnes) of its wheat production was exported in that period. Wheat was Russia's second largest non-fossil fuel export after gold.

=== State participation ===
After the USSR liquidation, the Russian state did not set itself the explicit task of participating in grain exports, however, quite early it tried to enter the grain market with the officially declared goals of supporting domestic producers and food security, ensuring public food purchases and organizing markets. The latter also meant the grain trade market, including for export. Work in this direction has been consistently delegated by the state to a number of organizational successive structures:

- In October 1994, for these purposes, the Federal Food Corporation was created under the Ministry of Agriculture and Food of the Russian Federation. The tasks assigned to it were not implemented in any full measure. On the fact of embezzlement of funds allocated by the state for the operation of the company, the General Prosecutor's Office opened a criminal case.
- In September 1997, the Federal Food Corporation was liquidated, and its functions were transferred to the Federal State Unitary Enterprise "Federal Agency for Regulation of the Food Market" newly created under the Ministry of Agriculture and Food of the Russian Federation. Already during this period, the agency focused as much as possible on the grain market, paying little attention to other segments of the food market.
- On March 21, 2007 FSUE was reorganized into OJSC "Agency for Food Market Regulation".
- In 2009, OJSC changed its name to OJSC "United Grain Company". Subsequently, the state carried out a partial privatization of the company, retaining a controlling stake – 50% plus one share.

== See also ==
- Soviet grain exports
