= Axone =

Axone may refer to:

- Axone (film), 2019 film
- Axone (arena), sports arena in Montbéliard, France
- Akhuni, a fermented Indian soybean product

== See also ==
- Axon (disambiguation)
