= Axiomatic (disambiguation) =

In mathematics, an axiomatic theory is one based on axioms.

Axiomatic may also refer to:

- Axiomatic (Egan book), a collection of short stories by Greg Egan
- "Axiomatic" (short story), a short story by Greg Egan
- Axiomatic (Tumarkin book), a 2018 book by Maria Tumarkin
- Axiomatic (album), a 2005 album by Australian band Taxiride

== See also ==
- Axiom (disambiguation)
