= Assiscunk Creek =

River in New Jersey, United States

Coordinates: 40.07406°N 74.83903°W

Assiscunk Creek is a tributary of the Delaware River in southwestern New Jersey in the United States.

== Name ==
The name Assiscunk (also spelled Assiscunke or Essiscunk) came from the Lenape language meaning "muddy creek". The name of the creek was also applied to the Axion people, a band of Lenape Indians who lived in the region until the late 17th century.

Other names were Wissahisk River, Birch Creek, and Barracks Creek.

== Location ==
Assiscunk Creek is approximately 17-mile (27 km) long, and drains an area of approximately 60 square miles (160 km^{2}) of Burlington County, New Jersey. It originates in Springfield Township, and soon forms the border between Springfield Township and Mansfield Township. It is fed by Annaricken Brook, and then by Crafts Creek just at the U.S. Route 206 crossing. Assiscunk Branch and Barkers Brook enter between U.S. Route 206 and the New Jersey Turnpike crossing. The creek begins to widen on the outskirts of Burlington City, where it empties into the Delaware River.

== Ecology and pollution ==
Wetlands along the creek are habitats for many species, among them the bog turtle, which is considered a threatened and endangered species.

The creek is designated as suboptimal under Habitat Analysis, and has moderately impaired waters, a major improvement from recent decades when the river was designated as severely impaired or having marginal habitat conditions.

Pollution is a problem for the Assiscunk Creek, and much of this comes from non-point sources. The land around the creek is mostly agricultural, but there are areas of urban surfaces and forest as well. Assiscunk Creek is an impaired river but has improved greatly in recent years thanks to hard efforts to stop the pollution.

== Tributaries ==
- Barkers Brook
- Assiscunk Branch
- Crafts Creek
- Annaricken Brook

== See also ==
- List of rivers of New Jersey
