= Axion people =

Historical Native American tribe from New Jersey, U.S.

Axion
Atsayonck
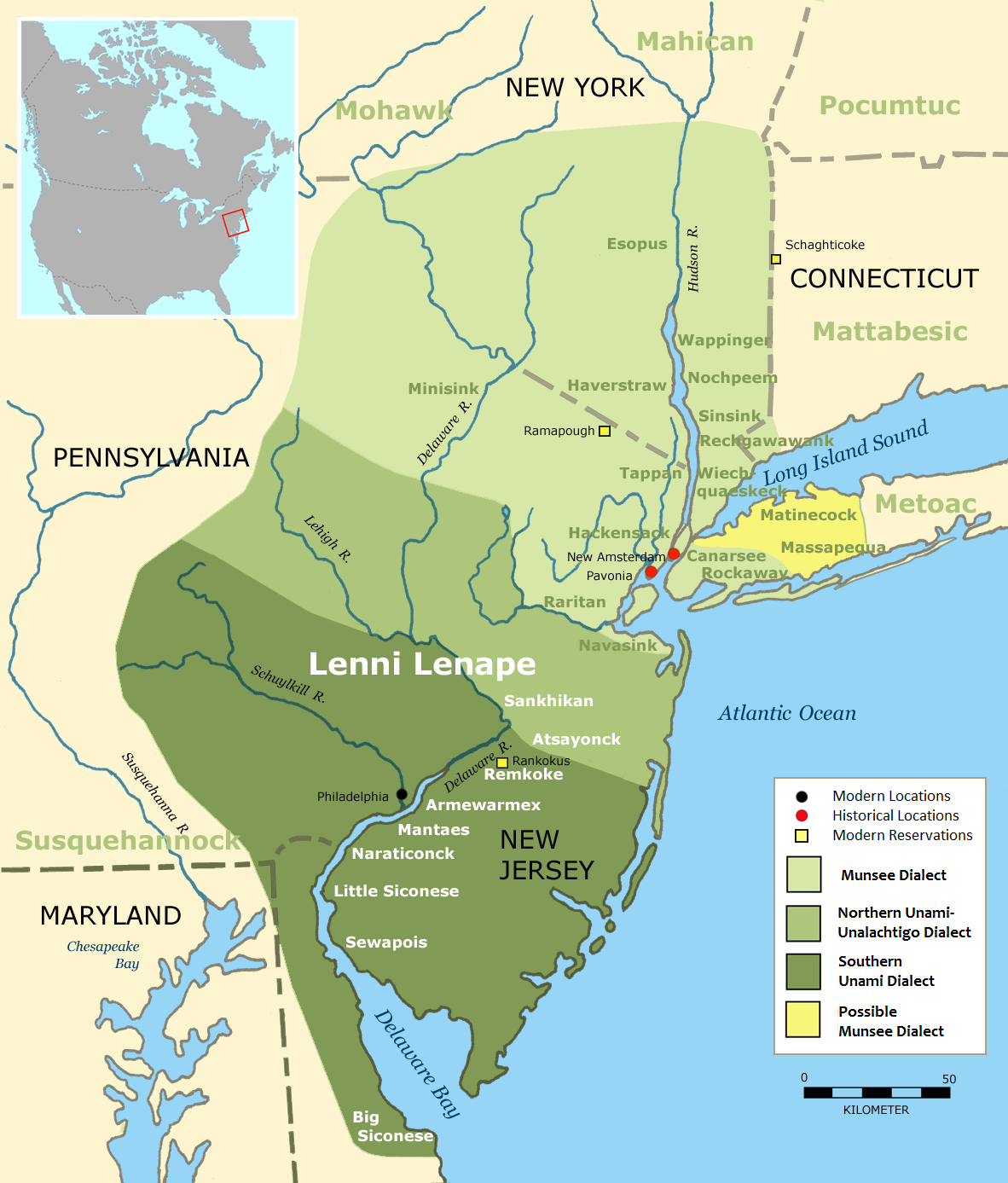

Total population
- Extinct as a tribe

Regions with significant populations
- Delaware River, New Jersey, U.S.

Languages
- Unami language

Religion
- Native American religion

Related ethnic groups
- other Lenape people

The Axion or Atsayonck were a band of Lenape Native Americans from present-day New Jersey. Their name may have derived either from the Unami term for "mud" or from Assiscunk Creek. The Axion lived along the Assunpink Creek, within territory bounded by Rancocas Creek and the site of what is now Trenton. In the mid-17th century, they were one of the largest Lenape bands on the Delaware River.

== Name ==
The name Axion derives from assiscu, an Unami language term for "mud", and translates as "the muddy place".

The name is also recorded as "Atsayonck". American archaeologist and historian Daniel Garrison Brinton suggested their name might derive from Assiscunk Creek, near Burlington, New Jersey. Czech-American anthropologist Aleš Hrdlička noted in 1902 that the Axion may have shared their etymology with the Atrions, a band living above the Mingo.

American archaeologist and historian Daniel Garrison Brinton suggested their name might derive from Assiscunk Creek, near Burlington, New Jersey.

== Language ==
The Axion people spoke an Unami language.

== Territory ==
The Axion lived on the eastern side of the Delaware River, from Rancocas Creek to the area that became Trenton, New Jersey.

== History ==
The Axion were a band of the Lenape people of what is now New Jersey. Their territory was on the eastern side of the Delaware River, from Rancocas Creek to the area that became Trenton, New Jersey. They mainly lived along Assunpink Creek. William Nelson, writing in 1902, identifies the Axion with a "warlike" people known as the Atsionk, whose main village is given as near the site of present-day Atsion.

In 1648, the Axion were one of the largest Native communities on the Delaware River, with approximately 200 warriors.

== Works cited ==
- Carman, Alan E. (2013). Footprints in Time: A History and Ethnology of the Lenape-Delaware Indian Culture. Trafford Publishing.
- Hrdlička, Aleš (1902). The Crania of Trenton, New Jersey, and Their Bearing Upon the Antiquity of Man in that Region. order of the Trustees, American Museum of Natural History.
- Nelson, William (1902). The New Jersey Coast in Three Centuries: History of the New Jersey Coast with Genealogical and Historic-biographical Appendix. Lewis Publishing Company.
