= Axioms (journal) =

Mathematics journal

- Discipline: Mathematics
- Language: English
- Edited by: Humberto Bustince

Publication details
- History: 2012–present
- Publisher: MDPI
- Frequency: Monthly
- Open access: Yes
- Impact factor: 1.6 (2024)

Standard abbreviations
- ISO 4: Axioms

Indexing
- ISSN: 2075-1680
- OCLC no.: 796223520

Links
- Journal homepage

Axioms is a peer-reviewed open access scientific journal that focuses on all aspects of mathematics, mathematical logic, and mathematical physics. It was established in 2012 and is published quarterly by MDPI, a publisher whose practices have been frequently and thoroughly called into question. The editor-in-chief is Humberto Bustince (Public University of Navarre). Axioms was discontinued in Scopus.

== Abstracting and indexing ==
The journal is abstracted and indexed in:

- EBSCO databases
- ProQuest databases
- Science Citation Index Expanded
- Scopus (2012–2023)
- zbMATH Open (2012–2019)

According to the Journal Citation Reports, the journal has a 2024 impact factor of 1.6.
