= Axon Automotive =

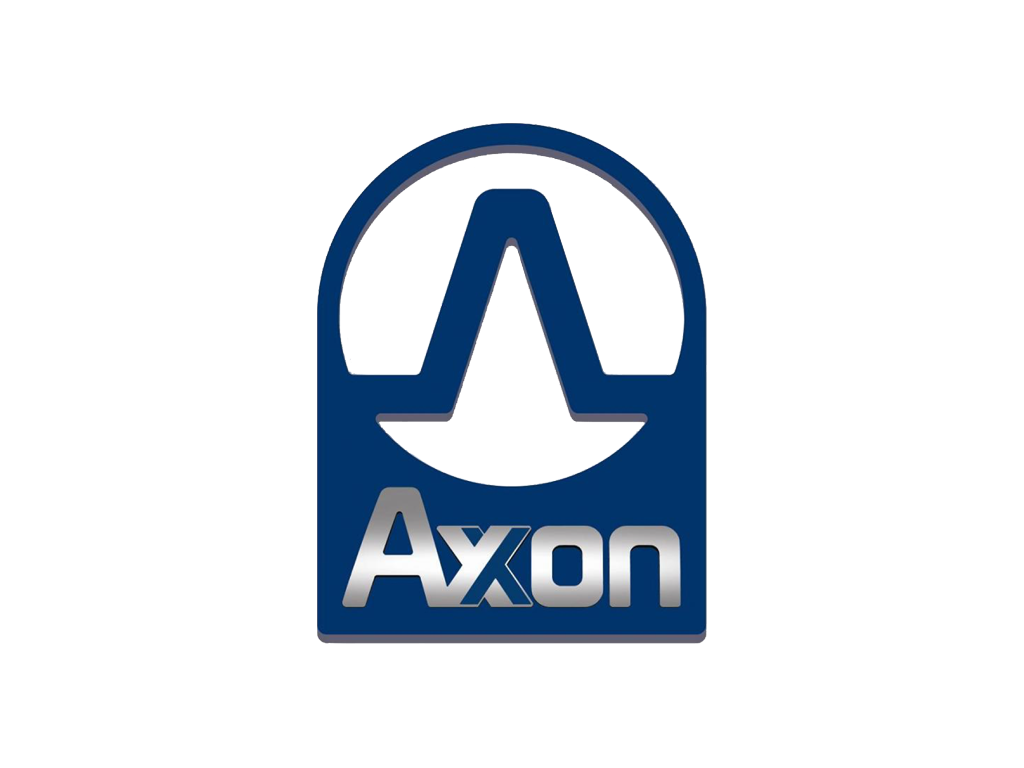
- Type: Private
- Industry: Automotive
- Founded: 13 December 2005
- Defunct: 17 November 2020
- Headquarters: Northampton, United Kingdom
- Area served: Worldwide
- Key people: Jerry Ren (Group Chairman)
- Products: Car bodies and structural composite components
- Services: Design, Analysis, Prototyping
- Owner: Bawtry Investments LTD

Axon Automotive was a British car manufacturer and car components manufacturer based in Northampton, Northamptonshire. The company was focused on design and material technologies.

Axon unveiled its 100 miles per imperial gallon (2.8 L/100 km; 83 mpg_{‑US}) hatchback on 23 May 2008 at the Sexy Green Car Show at the Eden Project. The new car, which was expected to be on sale in 2010, has a claimed CO_{2} emission rate of less than 80 g/km. The company used lightweight carbon fiber materials to improve fuel efficiency. The interior of the two-seater vehicle was made using recycled materials, such as jeans and pinstripe suits, which enhanced its environmental sustainability.

The company also introduced its pre-production plug-in hybrid at the Milton Keynes Science Festival. The company planned to launch two variants of this lightweight city car. The first variant featured a small-bore gasoline engine; the second featured a hybrid powertrain that combined an electric motor with a small gasoline engine.

Axon Automotive teamed up with Energy-Efficient Motorsport to modify a Caterham Seven Roadsport for a unique eco-friendly race organized by Shell in the UK. In this competition, drivers had to complete seven laps of a circuit within 40 minutes and maintain a speed of at least 15 mph. The main objective was to maximize fuel efficiency. By modifying this lightweight sports car – originally inspired by a Lotus design – the partnership exceeded its goal of achieving 100 miles per gallon.

The company was dissolved on 17 November 2020.
