= Axiom (rapper) =

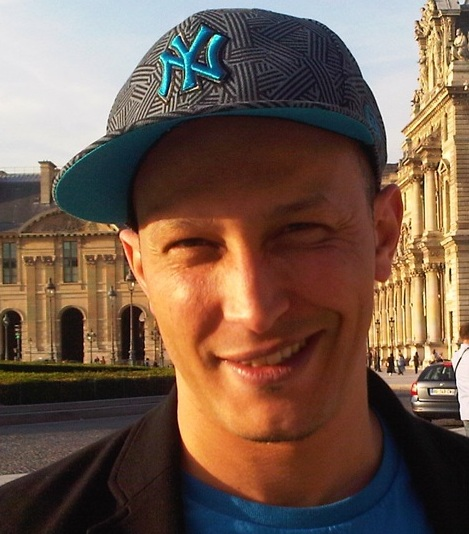
- Axiom in 2012

Background information
- Also known as: Axiom
- Born: Hicham Kochman; Lille, France
- Origin: Lille, France
- Genres: French hip hop
- Occupations: Rapper; singer; songwriter; record producer; entrepreneur
- Instrument: Vocals
- Label: Universal

Hicham Kochman better known by his stage name Axiom, is a French rapper, singer, record producer and Founder of KEAKR, a mobile social media app dedicated to the hip hop culture. As a social activist, he is involved in different civil rights and non-profit organizations such as Collectif Stop le Contrôle au Faciès, Think tank Graines de France8, and Collectif ACLeFeu.

Axiom created KEAKR, a web3 mobile social media app designed with real recording studios capabilities, video filters where artists can choose a music from a catalogue, freestyle on it then upload a music video. Added features include vocal effects, visual filters also mix and mastering.

== Life and career ==
Born in Lille, France, Axiom was raised in the projects of Moulins-Belfort in the north of France and started to write his first rhymes at the age of 13. Influenced by the Zulu-Nation early in his career, he quickly focused on a conscious and humanist rap. After performing across different stages in Lille, he started his first group called "Rebel Intellect" with the song "Revolution". Later on, he renamed the group "Mental Kombat" and released two albums L'arrêt public (1999) and La Legende (2003). He wrote and produced his own records.

Also known as a social activist, he became known for his commitment to various social issues such as equal rights for people, secularism and against police brutality in France. During the 2005 riots in France, he wrote the song "My letter to the President" composed with a sample of the French anthem "La Marseillaise". The song criticizes the failure of the French political system to address social issues in the French banlieues. He received thousand of letters from supporters worldwide as well as from the French president Jacques Chirac.

In 2006, he signed with Universal Music Group and released his first eponymous solo album with the single "Lille la Medina". After 2 years with Universal, he linked with Luc Besson on multiple projects, notably on the score of the movie District 13: Ultimatum with the song "La tour des miracles". He also collaborated with Luc Besson's festival Cannes et Banlieue (2007-2008).

In 2009, he founded the non-profit organization Norside to fight for civil rights and against police profiling of persons of color. In 2011, he released his sophomore album Axiom aka Hicham co-produced by Europacorp (Luc Besson's company) and his own record label (Kafard Production). The album was distributed by Sony Music. Musically, it is a blend of strong urban beats with oriental music close to his Moroccan origins. Still attached to his engaged and conscious lyrics, this album swings between pop, hip-hop and world music.

In 2011, Axiom was selected to participate to the International Visitor Leadership Program, an event organized by the U.S. Federal government to visit the country and learn more about its political and justice system. After the 2011 presidential French elections, he signed with other French public figures a petition for a generational reform in politics. On March 8, he wrote his first political essay "I have a dream" published by Noël Publishing. In this book, Axiom defends the idea that the fight in the French banlieues is a fight for civil rights similar to the ones of African Americans in the U.S. He denounced the systematic use of force by the police with their use of I.D. verification.

What the French banlieues need today is not to be indignant, but to take control of their civil rights .

Axiom is one of the Europe-Regional Center for Urban Cultures (CECU), better known as the House of Hip-Hop. He first envisioned this project at the age of 17, and later a meeting with Lille's mayor Martine Aubry years ago led to the birth of this project. On 4 October 2014, after 10 years of gestation, the center was inaugurated in the presence of Axiom and Martine Aubry in the district of Moulins where Axiom grew up. The building has 32,300 sqf are spread over 5 floors, including a 200-seat seating (700 standing), two stages(1600 and 430 sqf), dance studios and a rooftop terrace for graffiti artists.

In 2015 the artist created KEAKR, an app that aims to facilitate the development of independent artists. Its goal is to provide solutions to emerging artists, giving them the tools to develop their careers.

== Discography ==
=== Studio albums ===
- 2006 : Axiom
- 2011 : Axiom a.k.a Hicham

=== Soundtracks ===
- 2009 : Banlieue 13 Ultimatum
- 2014 : Piste Noire
