= Axon (surname) =

Axon is an English surname. Notable people with this surname include:

- Annemarie Carney Axon (born 1973), American judge
- David Axon (1951–2012), British astrophysicist
- John Axon (1900–1957), English engine driver awarded the George Cross
- John Axon (actor) (1960–2008), English actor; grandson of John Axon the engine driver
- Rachael Axon (b. 1985), English footballer
- Setta Axon (1870–1910), German-born British social worker
- William E. A. Axon (1846–1913), English librarian, antiquary, and journalist
