= Claas Axion =

Tractor

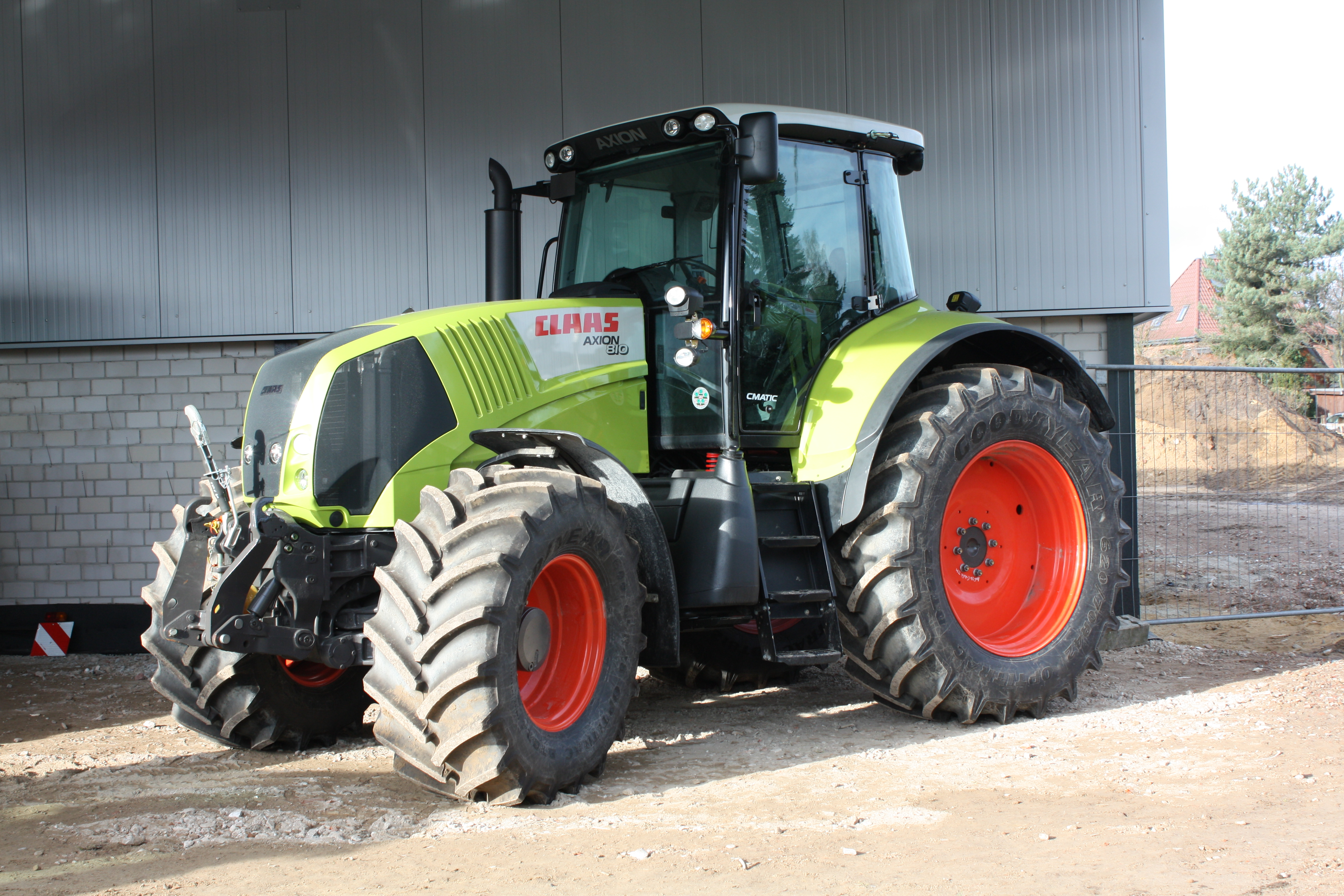
Claas Axion 810

The Claas Axion is a tractor built by the Claas-owned former Renault tractor plant at Le Mans. The 163–225 hp (ECE R24) tractor containing a John Deere engine and the Hexashift transmission with four ranges and six powershift stages. In its earliest stages of production it was known by its codename ET 97. Development work started for the new Axion in 2003. The Claas Axion model 850 was manufactured from 2006 to 2023.
