= Leonid Milov =

Russian historian (1929–2007)

Leonid Vasilievich Milov
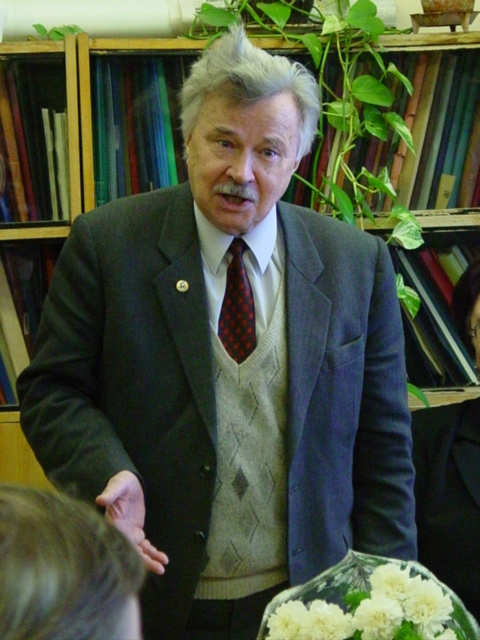
- Born: 28 July 1929; Moscow, Russia
- Died: 17 November 2007 (aged 78); Moscow, Russia
- Education: Lomonosov Moscow State University
- Known for: cliometrics; economic history
- Scientific career
- Fields: History; Economic history; Cliometrics; History of Russia
- Workplaces: Lomonosov Moscow State University

Leonid Milov (Russian: Леонид Васильевич Милов; 28 July 1929, Moscow – 17 November 2007, Moscow) was a prominent Soviet and Russian historian. He worked at the Faculty of History in Lomonosov Moscow State University.

== Life and works ==
His primary scientific interests were history of serfdom and genesis of capitalism in the Russian Empire, but he also specialized in Russian medieval law and Byzantine law. Milov was a pioneer of cliometrics in Russia along with professor Ivan Kovalchenko and others.
Author of more than 150 works, in 1998 he published his opus magnum - Russian Plowman and Special Aspects of Russian Historical Process. Having conducted a thorough research of Russian agriculture and peasant life in the 16th and 17th centuries he argued that Russian serfdom as economical institute was a "compensational mechanism for survival". His works on Russian economic history are considered very important today. In last years of his life, Milov was in charge of creating a completely new textbook on Russian history based on post-Soviet science. The result was a book in three volumes written by a collective of historians. It was published in 2006.
