= Acxiom (disambiguation) =

Acxiom may refer to:

- LiveRamp, a company founded in 1969 that traded as Acxiom Corporation from 1988 to 2018
- Acxiom, a division and brand of Interpublic Group of Companies, spun out from LiveRamp in 2018

Acxiom may also refer to:

- The Hymn of Acxiom, a musical recording on the Vienna Teng album Aims
