= First Medvedev cabinet =

Russian government led by Dmitry Medvedev (2012–2018)

First Cabinet of Dmitry Medvedev
- 54th Cabinet of Russia

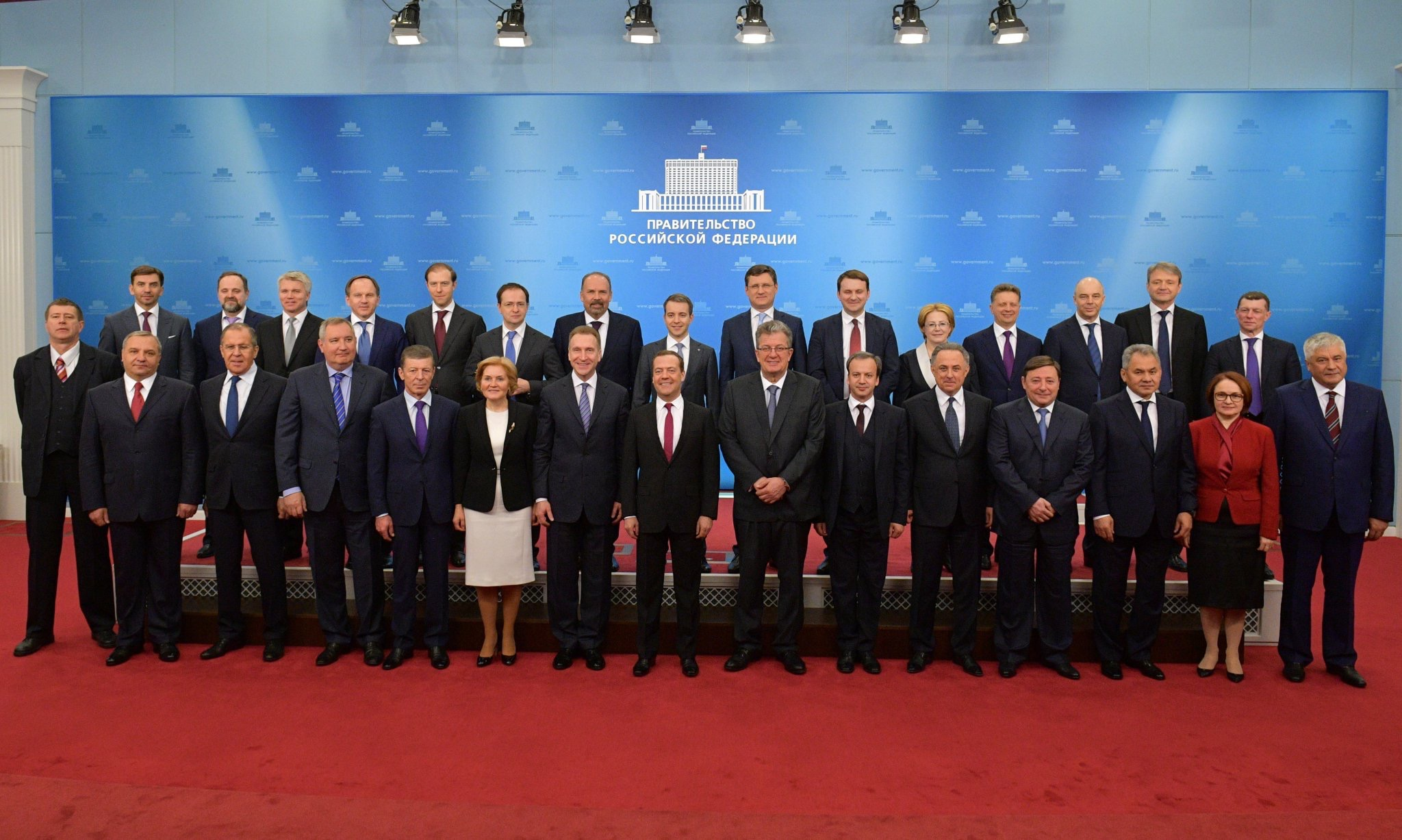
- Date formed: 21 May 2012
- Date dissolved: 7 May 2018

People and organisations
- Head of state: Vladimir Putin
- Head of government: Dmitry Medvedev
- Deputy head of government: Igor Shuvalov
- No. of ministers: 32
- Ministers removed: 12
- Total no. of members: 43
- Member party: United Russia (With support from LDPR)
- Status in legislature: Majority
- Opposition party: Communist Party; A Just Russia
- Opposition leader: Gennady Zyuganov; Sergey Mironov

History
- Predecessor: Putin II
- Successor: Medvedev II

Dmitry Medvedev's First Cabinet (May 2012 – May 2018) was a cabinet of the government of the Russian Federation following the 2012 Russian presidential election that resulted in the election of Vladimir Putin as the fourth President of Russia.

On 8 May 2012, The State Duma, the lower house of the bicameral Russian Parliament, voted in favor of the appointment of former President Dmitry Medvedev as the head of government. For the first time in the past 12 years, Prime Minister candidate has not received a constitutional majority. PM Medvedev promised to update 80% of the cabinet, but he would not change its structure.

On 8 May 2013, Medvedev's first deputy Vladislav Surkov, was relieved of duty after Putin reprimanded the government for failing to carry out all his presidential decrees from the previous year.

The government was dissolved on 7 May 2018, following Putin's inauguration for his 4th term as president, but continued to work as a Caretaker Cabinet until the formation of the new Cabinet.

== Government mechanism ==
=== Structural and personnel changes ===
The government was formed on 21 May 2012, shortly after the Prime Minister returned from visiting the G8 Summit at Camp David.

Under Medvedev, only six out of 22 ministers remained in their previous positions:

- Anatoly Serdyukov kept his position as the Minister of Defense.
- Sergei Lavrov kept his position as Minister for Foreign Affairs (and became the longest-serving minister).
- Anton Siluanov kept his position as Minister of Finance.
- Vitaly Mutko kept his position as Minister of Sport, and Aleksandr Konovalov kept his position as Minister of Justice. At the same time, Vladimir Puchkov was appointed as the new Minister for Emergency Situations, and Vladimir Kolokoltsev became the Minister for Internal Affairs, responsible for the Russian police reform.

The first structural change was the split of the Ministry of Health and Welfare Affairs into two separate Ministries – the Ministry of Health and the Ministry of Labour and Social Affairs. A new federal ministry was also formed: the Ministry for Development of the Russian Far East.

The Federal Service for Supervision over Health and Social Development Affairs Under the Ministry for Health was renamed the Federal Service for Supervision over the Health Sphere.

The Ministry of Sports, Tourism, and Youth Policy was renamed the Ministry of Sports. At the same time, the tourism functions were transferred to the Culture Ministry, and the Youth Policy functions were moved to the Ministry of Education.

The Federal Service for Intellectual Property become part of the Ministry for Economic Development.

In June 2012, Medvedev signed a governmental resolution to subordinate the Federal Service for Fisheries to the Ministry of Agriculture.

On 22 April 2015, during a governmental session, Putin proposed that Agriculture Minister Nikolai Fyodorov get a job as Presidential Aid for Agricultural Affairs. Former Governor of Krasnodar Krai, Aleksandr Tkachyov, replaced him.

=== New federal bodies and dissolution of some organs ===
According to the Presidential Decree "On the Federal Bodies of the Executive Authority", new governmental offices were formed:

- The Governmental Commission for coordinating the Open Government Activities, headed by Minister Mikhail Abyzov.
- The Ministry for Development of Russian Far East was formed to implement economic and social development policies in the Russian Far East.
- The Federal Agency for Construction, Housing and Public Utilities under the Regional Development Ministry of Russia

Medvedev announced on 28 May 2012 that he will manage a weekly session with his Deputies every Monday, while the Session of the Government and the Presidium of the Government will be every Wednesday.

- On 1 November 2013, the Federal Agency for Construction and Housing was re-established as the Federal Ministry for Construction and Housing, and Mikhail Men, the previous Governor of Ivanovo Oblast, was appointed as minister.
- On 31 March 2014, a new ministry was formed, the Ministry for Crimean Affairs. Oleg Savelyev was appointed as the minister of Crimea.

On 8 September 2014, Medvedev decided to abolish the Ministry of Regional Development following the creation of the Ministry for Crimean Affairs, the Ministry for North Caucasus Affairs and the Ministry for Development of the Russian Far East, which perform the same functions. The functions of the abolished Ministry of Regional Development were distributed between the Ministry of Economic Development, the Ministry of Construction and Housing and Communal Services, the Ministry of Culture of the Russian Federation, the Ministry of Finance and the Ministry of Justice. In addition, Putin signed a decree dissolving the Federal Service for Defence Contracts and the Rosoboronpostavka, Federal Agency for the supply of arms, military and special equipment and supplies; both were under the supervision of the Ministry of Defense.

== Overview ==
Among other objectives, Medvedev's cabinet was tasked with overcoming the lowest growth of the economy since the 2008 Russian financial crisis. To do so, Medvedev offered specific measures, including strict control over tariff rises in coming years, the possible canceling of import duties on scientific equipment, regional tax holidays and a series of new measures implemented through the Central Bank to facilitate long-term investment. He also urged large Russian companies, including gas giant Gazprom, oil titan Rosneft and aluminum producer Rusal, to create their universities.

== Controversies and reception ==
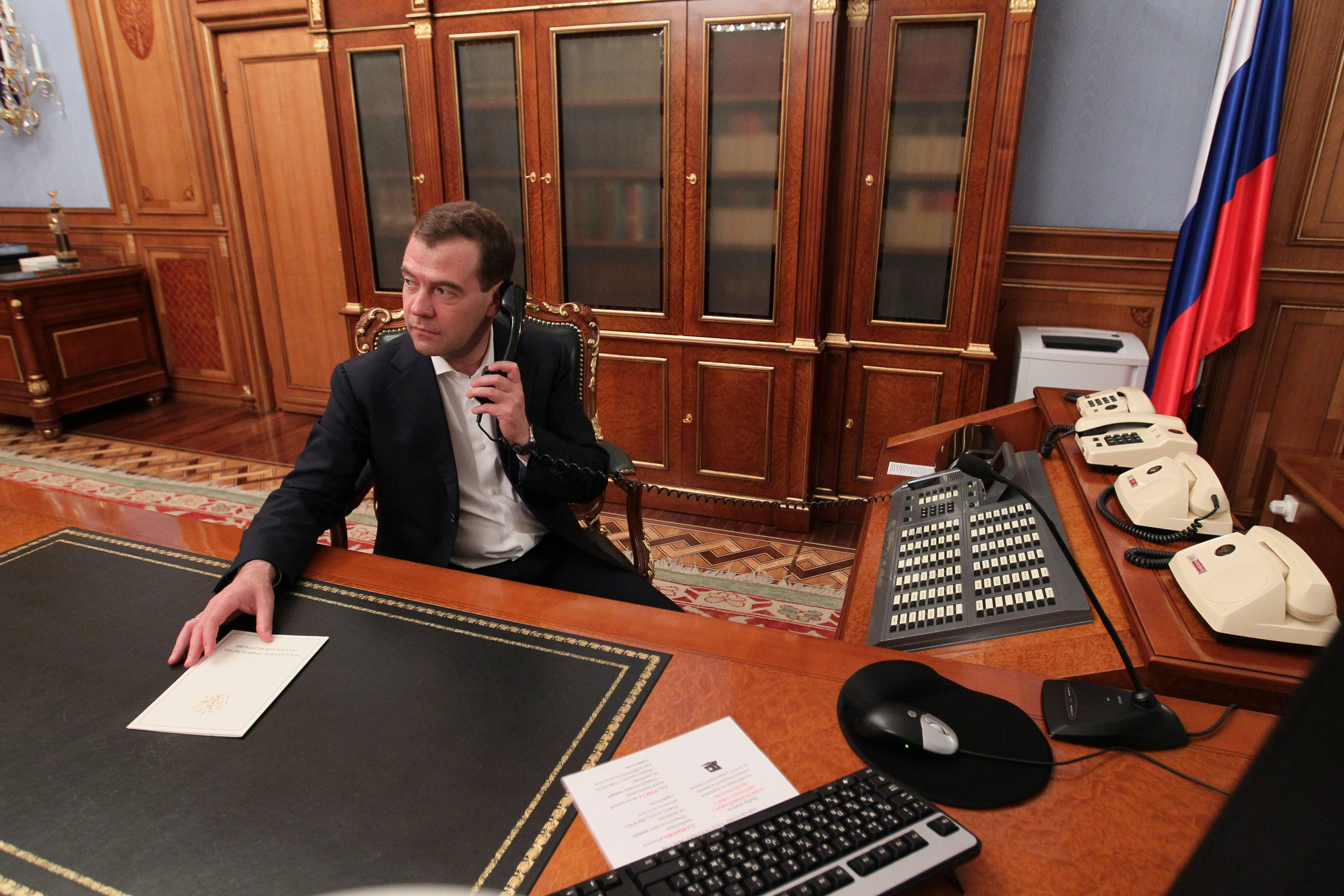
Medvedev in his working office at the White House at the first day of his first term as Prime Minister, 8 May 2012

In September, Putin openly criticized some Cabinet ministers for failing to fulfill his post-inauguration decrees, resulting in Regional Development Minister Oleg Govorun resigning.

In 2013, Minister of Education Dmitry Livanov came under heavy criticism, and members of the State Duma demanded his resignation. In April 2013, in his first State Duma report speech about the work of the government in the past year, Medvedev began his report just minutes after a video was leaked showing Putin scolding senior government officials for their poor performance during a closed-door meeting that he chaired in the Republic of Kalmykia.

Following the 2014 Crimean crisis, the Annexation of Crimea to Russia, and the sanctions that the U.S. announced, Medvedev assured that the Russian government had all the necessary reserves to observe its social obligations. He said, "Despite the complicated situation and the situation in the industry, we shall try to stimulate further growth of industries, their modernization, and we shall also pay attention to investments in agriculture".

Olga Vasilieva was appointed Minister of Science and Education in August 2016, following Livanov's resignation.

On 14 November 2016, the Investigative Committee of Russia announced that Minister of Economic Development Aleksei Ulyukayev had been detained due to allegations that he received a $2 million bribe for an assessment that led to the Kremlin-controlled oil company Rosneft's acquisition of a 50.08% stake in Bashneft. This followed a string operation after months of surveillance. On the same day, Putin dismissed him from his ministerial position.

== Cabinet members ==
Office	Term
Prime Minister; Dmitry Medvedev	8 May 2012 – 7 May 2018
First Deputy Prime Minister; Igor Shuvalov	12 May 2008 – 7 May 2018
Deputy Prime Minister – Chief of Staff of the Government; Vladislav Surkov; Sergei Prikhodko	21 May 2012 – 8 May 2013; 22 May 2013 – 7 May 2018
Deputy Prime Minister; Dmitry Kozak	21 May 2012 – 7 May 2018
Deputy Prime Minister for Industry and Energy; Arkady Dvorkovich	21 May 2012 – 7 May 2018
Deputy Prime Minister for Defense and Space Industry; Dmitry Rogozin	21 May 2012 – 7 May 2018
Deputy Prime Minister for Social Affairs; Olga Golodets	21 May 2012 – 7 May 2018
Deputy Prime Minister; Aleksandr Khloponin	21 May 2012 – 7 May 2018
Deputy Prime Minister – Presidential Envoy to the Far Eastern Federal District; Yury Trutnev	31 August 2013 – 7 May 2018
Deputy Prime Minister for Sport, Tourism and Youth Policy; Vitaly Mutko	19 October 2016 – 7 May 2018
Minister of the Interior Affairs; Vladimir Kolokoltsev	21 May 2012 – 7 May 2018
Minister of Emergency Situations; Vladimir Puchkov	21 May 2012 – 7 May 2018
Minister of Health; Veronika Skvortsova	21 May 2012 – 7 May 2018
Minister of Foreign Affairs; Sergei Lavrov	9 March 2004 – 7 May 2018
Minister of Communications and Mass Media; Nikolai Nikiforov	21 May 2012 – 7 May 2018
Minister of Culture; Vladimir Medinsky	21 May 2012 – 7 May 2018
Minister of Defence; Anatoly Serdyukov; Sergei Shoigu	12 May 2008 – 6 November 2012; 6 November 2012 – 7 May 2018
Minister of Education and Science; Dmitry Livanov; Olga Vasilyeva	21 May 2012 – 19 August 2016; 19 August 2016 – 7 May 2018
Minister of Natural Resources; Sergei Donskoi	21 May 2012 – 7 May 2018
Minister of Agriculture and Fishing; Nikolai Fyodorov; Aleksandr Tkachyov	21 May 2012 – 21 April 2015; 22 April 2015 – 7 May 2018
Minister of Industry and Trade; Denis Manturov	21 May 2012 – 7 May 2018
Minister of Transport; Maksim Sokolov	21 May 2012 – 7 May 2018
Minister of Finance; Anton Siluanov	16 December 2011 – 7 May 2018
Minister of Economic Development; Andrei Belousov; Aleksei Ulyukayev; Yevgeny Yelin (acting); Maksim Oreshkin	21 May 2012 – 24 June 2013; 24 June 2013 – 15 November 2016; 15 November 2016 – 30 November 2016; 30 November 2016 – 7 May 2018
Minister of Labour and Social Affairs; Maksim Topilin	21 May 2012 – 7 May 2018
Minister of Energy; Aleksandr Novak	21 May 2012 – 7 May 2018
Minister of Justice; Aleksandr Konovalov	12 May 2008 – 7 May 2018
Minister for Open Government Affairs; Mikhail Abyzov	21 May 2012 – 7 May 2018
Minister for Russian Far East; Viktor Ishayev; Aleksandr Galushka	21 May 2012 – 31 August 2013; 11 September 2013 – 7 May 2018
Ministry for Crimean Affairs (dissolved); Oleg Savelyev; Aleksandr Galushka	31 March 2014; 31 March 2014 – 15 July 2015
Minister of Sport; Vitaly Mutko; Pavel Kolobkov	12 May 2008 – 19 October 2016; 19 October 2016 – 7 May 2018
Minister for Construction and Housing; Mikhail Men	1 November 2013 – 7 May 2018
Minister of Regional Development (dissolved); Oleg Govorun; Igor Slyunyayev	21 May 2012 – 17 October 2012; 17 October 2012 – 8 September 2014
