= Andrei Klepach =

Russian economist (born 1959)

- Андрей Клепач

Deputy Minister of Economic Development
- In office February 2008 – July 2014 Serving with Sergei Belyakov, Stanislav Voskresensky, Oleg Savelyev, Alexei Likhachev, and Oleg Fomichev
- Minister: Elvira Nabiullina (until 2012); Andrei Belousov (2012-2013); Alexei Ulyukayev (from 2013)
- Preceded by: Andrei Belousov (Macroeconomic Forecasting)
- Succeeded by: Alexei Vedev (Macroeconomic Forecasting)

Chief economist at VEB.RF
- In office July 2014 – August 2026
- Preceded by: Position established
- Succeeded by: Alexander Isakov

Personal details
- Born: 4 March 1959 (age 67) Moscow, Soviet Union (now Russia)
- Education: Moscow State University

Andrei Nikolayevich Klepach (Russian: Андрей Николаевич Клепач; born 4 March 1959) is a Russian economist. He has the federal state civilian service rank of 1st class Active State Councillor of the Russian Federation.

In July 2014, he assumed the post of a chief economist of VEB.RF bank.

In August 2026, he was fired days after a media report of a scathing speech to economists delivered in May, at Никитского клуба (Nikitsky club), warning "that Moscow would not win a prolonged economic war with Ukraine".

== Political activity ==
Prior to this Klepach was a deputy economics minister of Russia, and since 2004 the director of macroeconomic forecasting department of the Ministry of Economic Development and Trade of the Russian Federation. In that capacity, he dealt with the analysis and forecasting model inflation in the Russian economy, the financial situation of enterprises and industries, enterprises and the non-payment ratio of supply and demand money, market surveys of industrial enterprises, and study strategies for their survival and restructuring. Klepach has published about 50 scientific publications.
