= Sergei Belyakov =

Russian government official and manager

Sergey Belyakov
- Сергей Юрьевич Беляков
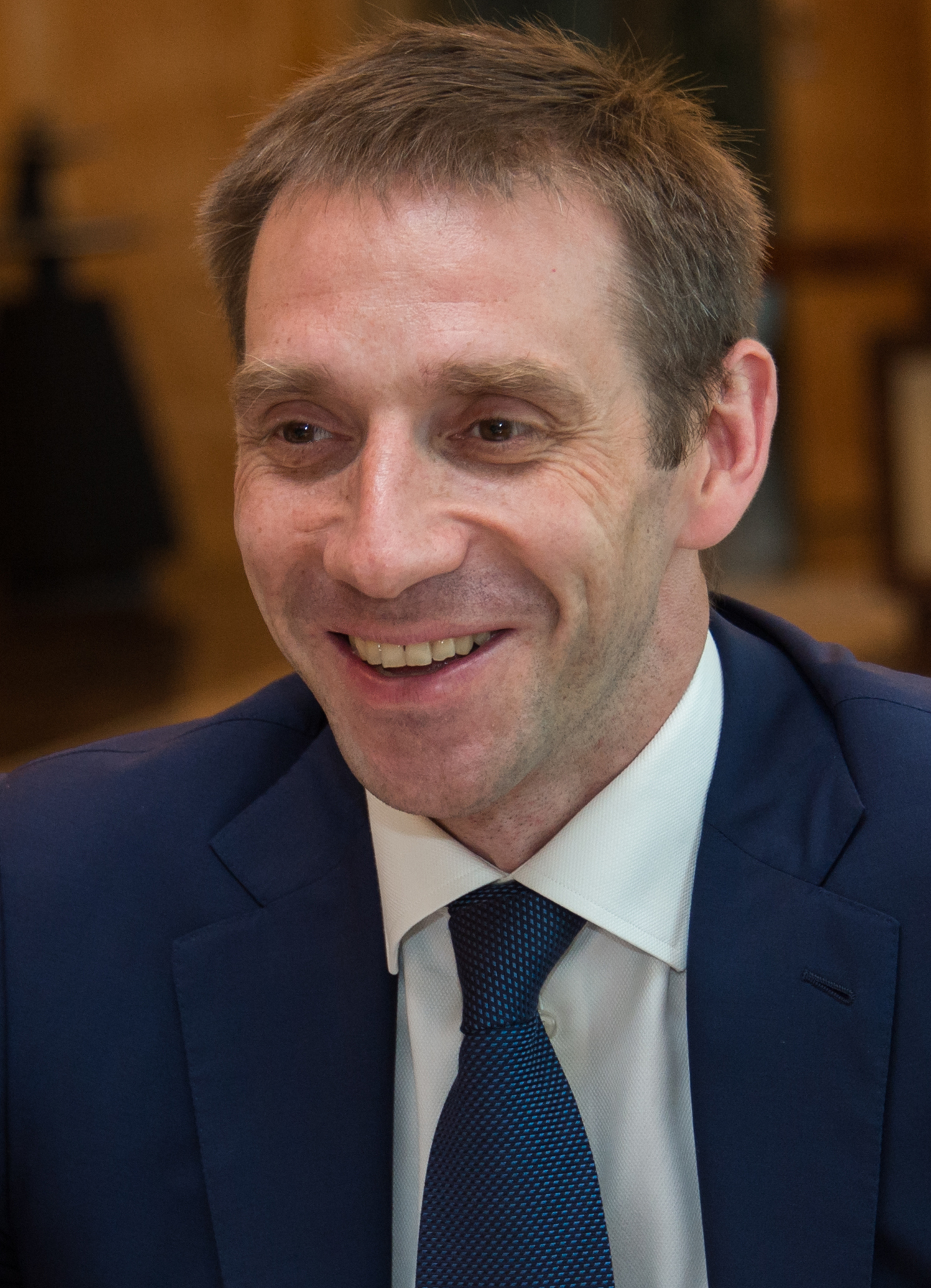
- Belyakov in 2015

Deputy Minister of Economic Development
- In office 3 August 2012 – 6 August 2014 Serving with Maxim Oreshkin, Alexei Likhachev, Oleg Fomichev, Alexei Vedev, Andrei Klepach
- Preceded by: Stanislav Voskresensky
- Succeeded by: Stanislav Voskresensky

Personal details
- Born: 26 June 1973 (age 53) Moscow, Russian SFSR, Soviet Union
- Education: FSB Academy
- Occupation: Businessman

Sergey Yurievich Belyakov (Russian: Сергей Юрьевич Беляков; born 26 June 1973) is a Russian government official and manager who served as the Deputy Minister of Economic Development of Russia from 2012 to 2014.

== Biography ==
Belyakov was born on 26 June 1973, in Moscow. He was enrolled in MIREA — Russian Technological University in Moscow. In 1991, he was drafted into the army and served in the FSB Border Service of Russia. In 1998, he studied at the FSB Academy.

In 2001, he started working for the Basic Element (company). In 2005, he started working for the Russian Union of Industrialists and Entrepreneurs.

In 2008, he joined the Ministry of Economic Development at the invitation of Deputy Minister Stanislav Voskresensky.

In August 2012, he was appointed as Deputy Minister of Economic Development of Russia.

In September 2014, he took the position of chairman of the Board of the St. Petersburg International Economic Forum.

The Epstein files revealed that Epstein had befriended Belyakov in 2014.

== See also ==
- List of people named in the Epstein files
