= Topilin =

Topilin (Russian: Топилин) is a Russian masculine surname, its feminine counterpart is Topilina. It may refer to

- Gelena Topilina (born 1994), Russian competitor in synchronized swimming
- Maxim Topilin (born 1967), Russian economist and minister
