= Federal Accreditation Service =

- Федеральная служба по аккредитации (Росаккредитация)
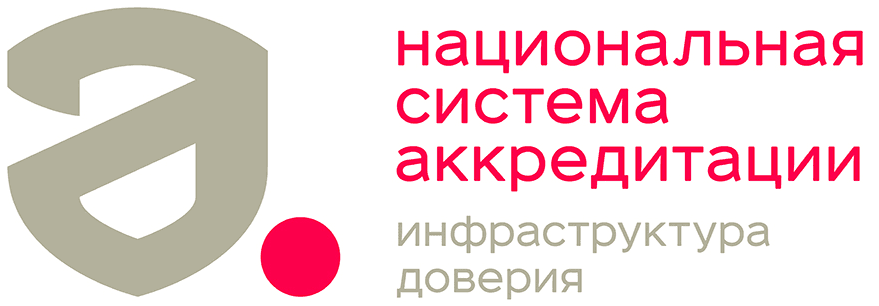
- Emblem of the Federal Accreditation Service

Agency overview
- Formed: 24 January 2011; 15 years ago
- Agency executive: Nazariy Skrypnik
- Parent agency: Ministry of Economic Development
- Website: Fsa.gov.ru

The Federal Accreditation Service (RusAccreditation; Russian: Федеральная служба по аккредитации (Росаккредитация), romanized: Federal'naya sluzhba po akkreditatsii) is a federal body that develops and carries out the standards of accreditation of legal bodies in the Russian Federation. It was formed on January 24, 2011 as part of Russia's Ministry of Economic Development.
