= Anton Kotyakov =

Russian politician (born 1980)

- Антон Котяков
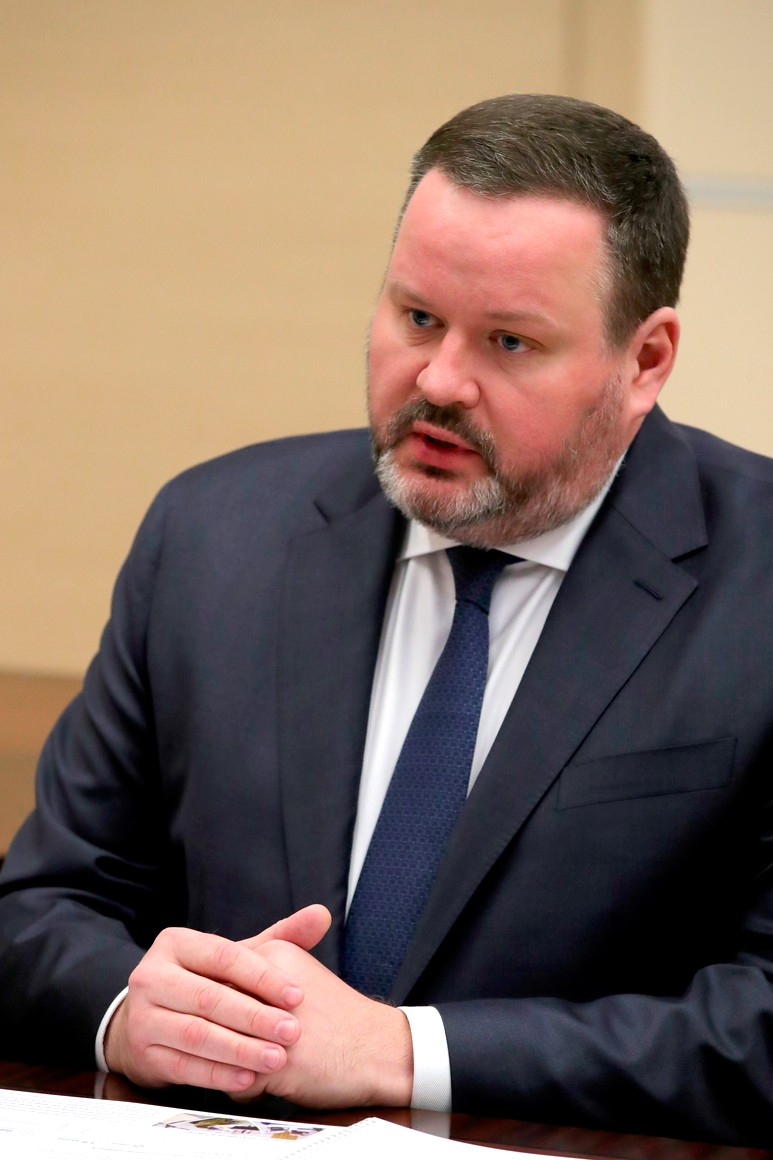
- Kotyakov in 2022

Minister of Labour and Social Protection
- Incumbent
- Assumed office 21 January 2020
- Prime Minister: Mikhail Mishustin
- Preceded by: Maxim Topilin

Personal details
- Born: 15 August 1980 (age 46) Samara, Soviet Union
- Party: United Russia
- Education: Samara State Academy of Economics; Russian Presidential Academy of National Economy and Public Administration
- Profession: Economist

Anton Olegovich Kotyakov (Russian: Антон Олегович Котяков; born 15 August 1980) is a Russian statesman, politician and economist. He is serving as Minister of Labor and Social Protection of Russia in Mikhail Mishustin's Cabinet since 21 January 2020.

== Biography ==
Kotyakov was born on 15 August 1980 in the city of Kuibyshev (now the city of Samara).

From August 2001 to August 2005 he worked in the department of financial management of the administration of the Samara Oblast having gone from a leading specialist to a consultant.

In 2002 he graduated with honors from the Samara State Academy of Economics, majoring in Economic Theory, specializing in Theory and Organization of the Securities Market.

In 2005 he graduated from graduate school, defended his thesis on "The Market of Russian Subfederal Debt Securities: Formation and Development", he was awarded the degree of candidate of economic sciences.

From August 2005 to July 2007, he worked as the head of a department of the Ministry of Finance of the Samara Oblast, after which he was appointed head of the department for the execution of the regional budget and reporting of the Ministry of Finance of the Samara Oblast, where he worked until April 2012.

In 2011, he graduated from the magistracy at the Russian Presidential Academy of National Economy and Public Administration with a degree in administrative and financial law.

From April 2012 to March 2014, he worked in the Federal Treasury as head of the department for improving functional activities.

In March 2014, he joined the Government of the Moscow Oblast. Until January 2017, he served as Minister of Finance of the Moscow Oblast, after which he headed the Joint Ministry of Economics and Finance of the Moscow Oblast.

From May 2017 to January 2020, he worked as Deputy Minister of Finance of the Russian Federation.

He is Member of the third set of the program for the development of the personnel management reserve of the Higher School of Public Administration of the Russian Presidential Academy of National Economy and Public Administration.

On 21 January 2020, by presidential decree of the President of Russia, Vladimir Putin he was appointed Minister of Labor and Social Protection in Mikhail Mishustin's Cabinet.

== Sanctions ==
In December 2022 the EU sanctioned Anton Kotyakov in relation to the 2022 Russian invasion of Ukraine.
