= Ministry of Labour and Social Protection =

Government minister of Russia

Ministry of Labour and Social Protection of the Russian Federation
- Министерство труда и социальной защиты Российской Федерации; Ministerstvo truda i sotsialnoi zashchity Rossiiskoi Federatsii
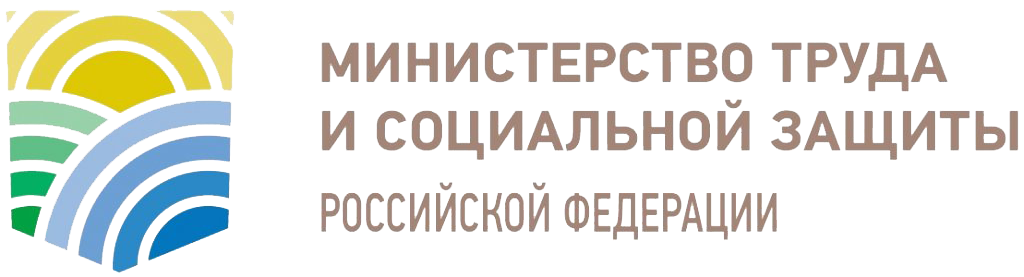

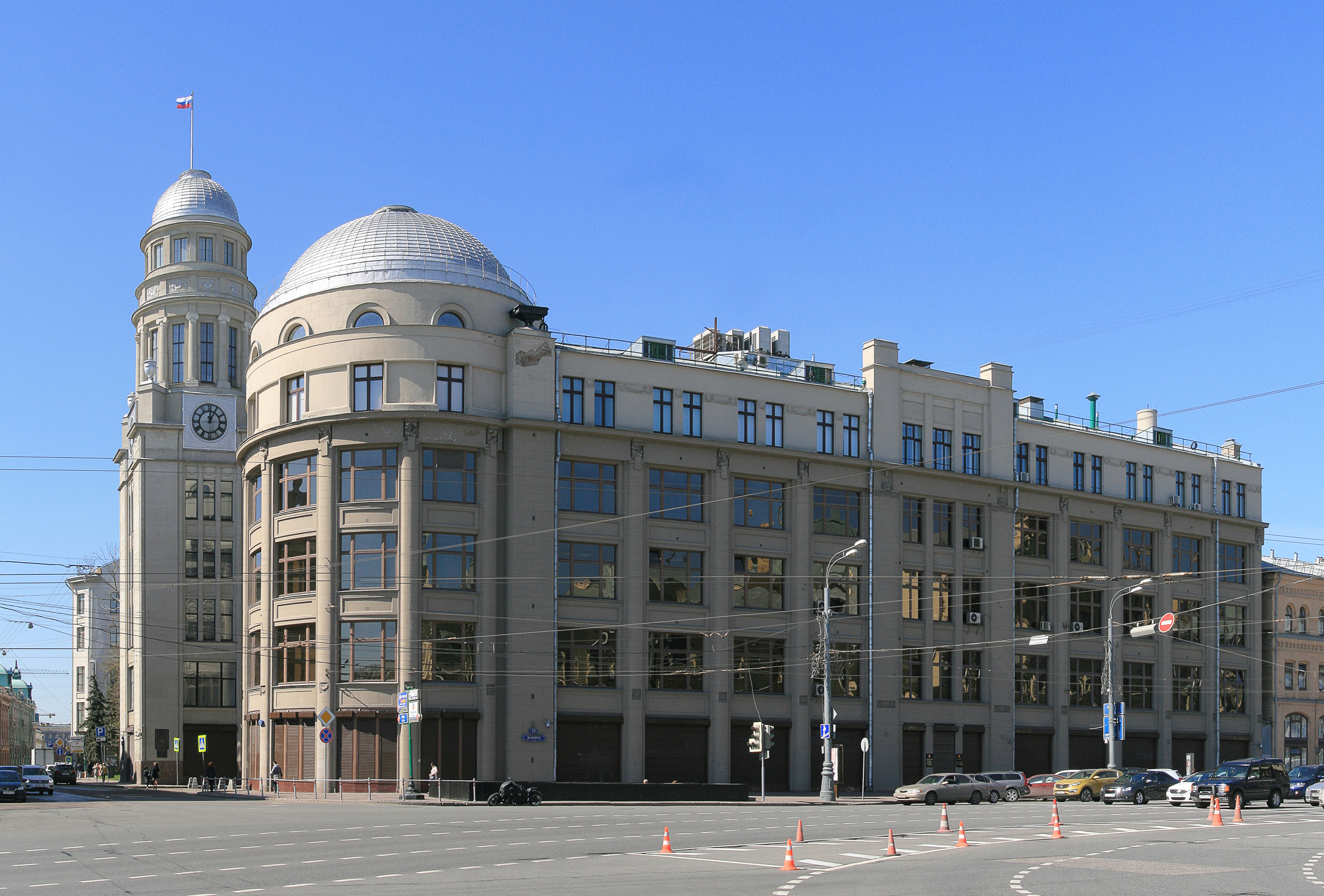

Agency overview
- Formed: 2012
- Preceding agency: Ministry of Health and Social Development
- Jurisdiction: Government of Russia
- Headquarters: Buildings of the Northern Insurance Company, Ilyinka Street 21, Moscow; 55°45′23″N 37°37′46″E
- Minister responsible: Anton Kotyakov
- Website: mintrud.gov.ru

The Ministry of Labour and Social Protection of the Russian Federation (Russian: Министерство труда и социальной защиты Российской Федерации, romanized: Ministerstvo sotsialnoi zashchity Rossiiskoi Federatsii) is a ministry of the Government of Russia responsible for social protection and labor.

The Ministry of Labour and Social Protection was formed in 2012 under Prime Minister Dmitry Medvedev when the former Ministry of Health and Social Development was split in two, with the health departments forming the Ministry of Health. It is headquartered at the Buildings of the Northern Insurance Company in Tverskoy District, Moscow.

Anton Kotyakov has served as the Minister of Labour and Social Protection since 21 January 2020.
