= Andrey Belousov =

Minister of Defence of Russia

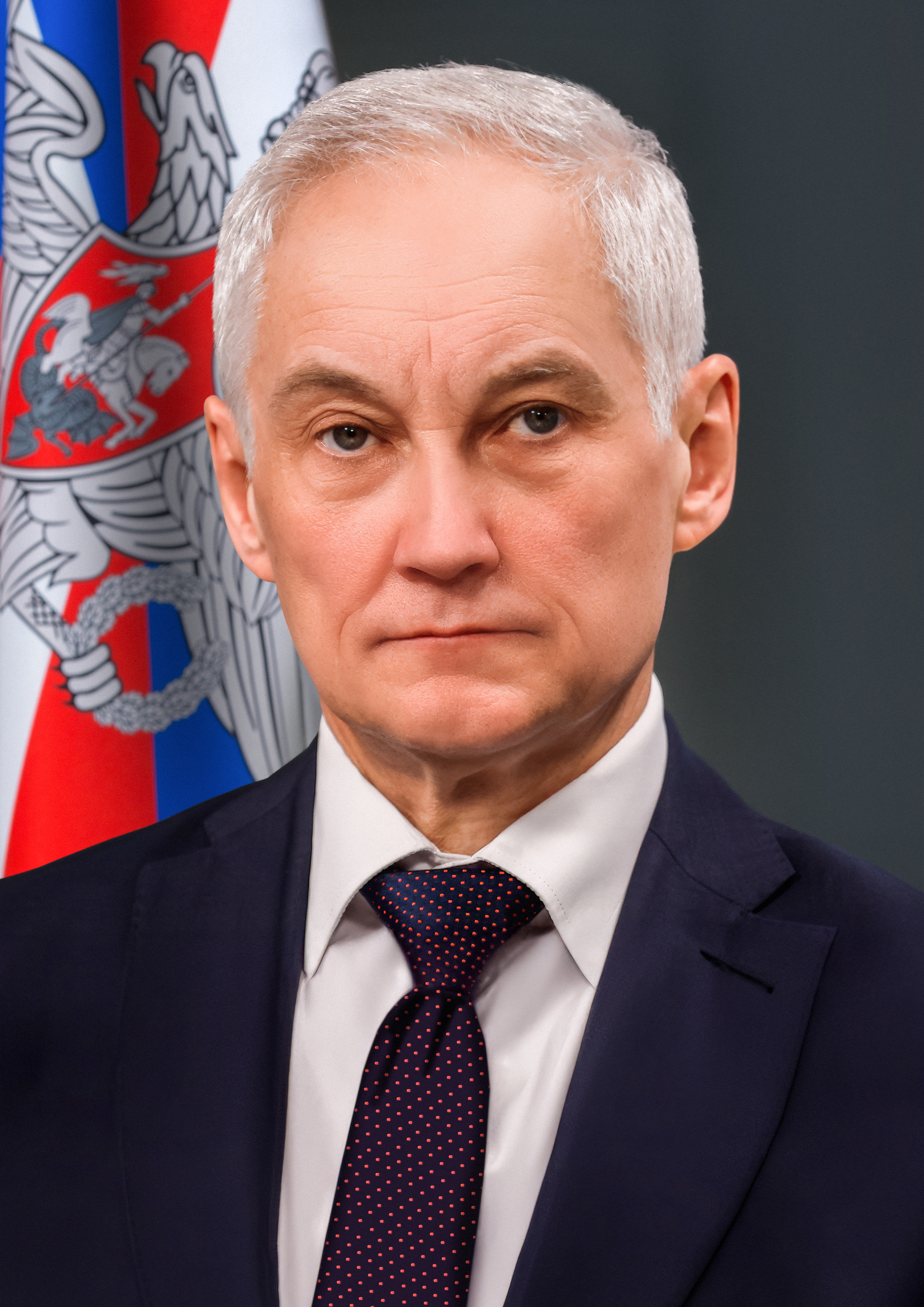
- Official portrait, 2024

8th Minister of Defence
- Incumbent
- Assumed office 14 May 2024
- President: Vladimir Putin
- Prime Minister: Mikhail Mishustin
- First Deputy: Valery Gerasimov; Leonid Gornin
- Preceded by: Sergei Shoigu

First Deputy Prime Minister of Russia
- In office 21 January 2020 – 7 May 2024
- Prime Minister: Mikhail Mishustin
- Preceded by: Anton Siluanov
- Succeeded by: Denis Manturov

Acting Prime Minister of Russia
- In office 30 April – 19 May 2020
- President: Vladimir Putin
- Preceded by: Mikhail Mishustin
- Succeeded by: Mikhail Mishustin

Aide to the President of Russia in Economic Affairs
- In office 24 June 2013 – 21 January 2020
- President: Vladimir Putin
- Preceded by: Elvira Nabiullina
- Succeeded by: Maxim Oreshkin

Minister of Economic Development
- In office 21 May 2012 – 14 June 2013
- Prime Minister: Dmitry Medvedev
- Preceded by: Elvira Nabiullina
- Succeeded by: Alexey Ulyukaev

Personal details
- Born: 17 March 1959 (age 67) Moscow, Soviet Union
- Party: Independent
- Education: Moscow State University

Andrey Removich Belousov (Note: In this name that follows East Slavic naming customs, the patronymic is Removich and the family name is Belousov.) (Note: Russian: Андрей Рэмович Белоусов, IPA: [ɐnˈdrʲej ˈrɛməvʲɪd͡ʑ‿bʲɪɫɐˈusəf]) (born 17 March 1959) is a Russian politician and economist, serving as the minister of defence of Russia since 14 May 2024.

From January 2020 to May 2024, he served as first deputy prime minister of Russia. Previously, he was an aide to the president of Russia and minister of economic development.

Belousov has the Federal State civilian service rank of 1st class Active State Councillor of the Russian Federation.

== Early life ==
Belousov was born in Moscow on 17 March 1959. His mother was a chemist and his father was an economist who worked in the State Planning Committee. Belousov went to the prestigious secondary school focused on mathematics and physics (now known as Lyceum named after V.F. Ovchinnikov).

His younger brother Dmitry (born in 1972) is an economist who works as Director of the Analysis and Forecasting of Macroeconomic Processes Laboratory of the Institute of Economic Forecasting of the Russian Academy of Sciences.

== Education ==
Belousov studied economics at the Faculty of Economics of the Moscow State University, from which he graduated with honors with a major in economic cybernetics in 1981.

In 1986, he defended his thesis on the topic Simulation approach to modeling interrelated processes of formation and use of circulating capital at the Central Economic Mathematical Institute and became a Candidate of Economic Sciences.

In 2006, Belousov defended his thesis on the topic Contradictions and prospects for the development of the system of the reproduction of the Russian economy at the Institute of Economic Forecasting of the Russian Academy of Sciences and became a Doctor of Economic Sciences.

== Career ==
=== Academic career ===
From 1981 to 1986, Belousov was a probationer-researcher and then a junior researcher in the simulation laboratory of human-machine systems of the Central Economic Mathematical Institute. From 1991 to 2006, he was head of a laboratory of the Institute of Economic Forecasting of the Russian Academy of Sciences. He was external advisor to the Prime Minister from 2000 to 2006.

=== Ministry of Economic Development (2006–2013) ===
Belousov served as Deputy Minister of Economic Development and Trade for two years from 2006 to 2008. From 2008 to 2012, he was Director of the Finance and Economic Department in the Russian Prime Minister's office.

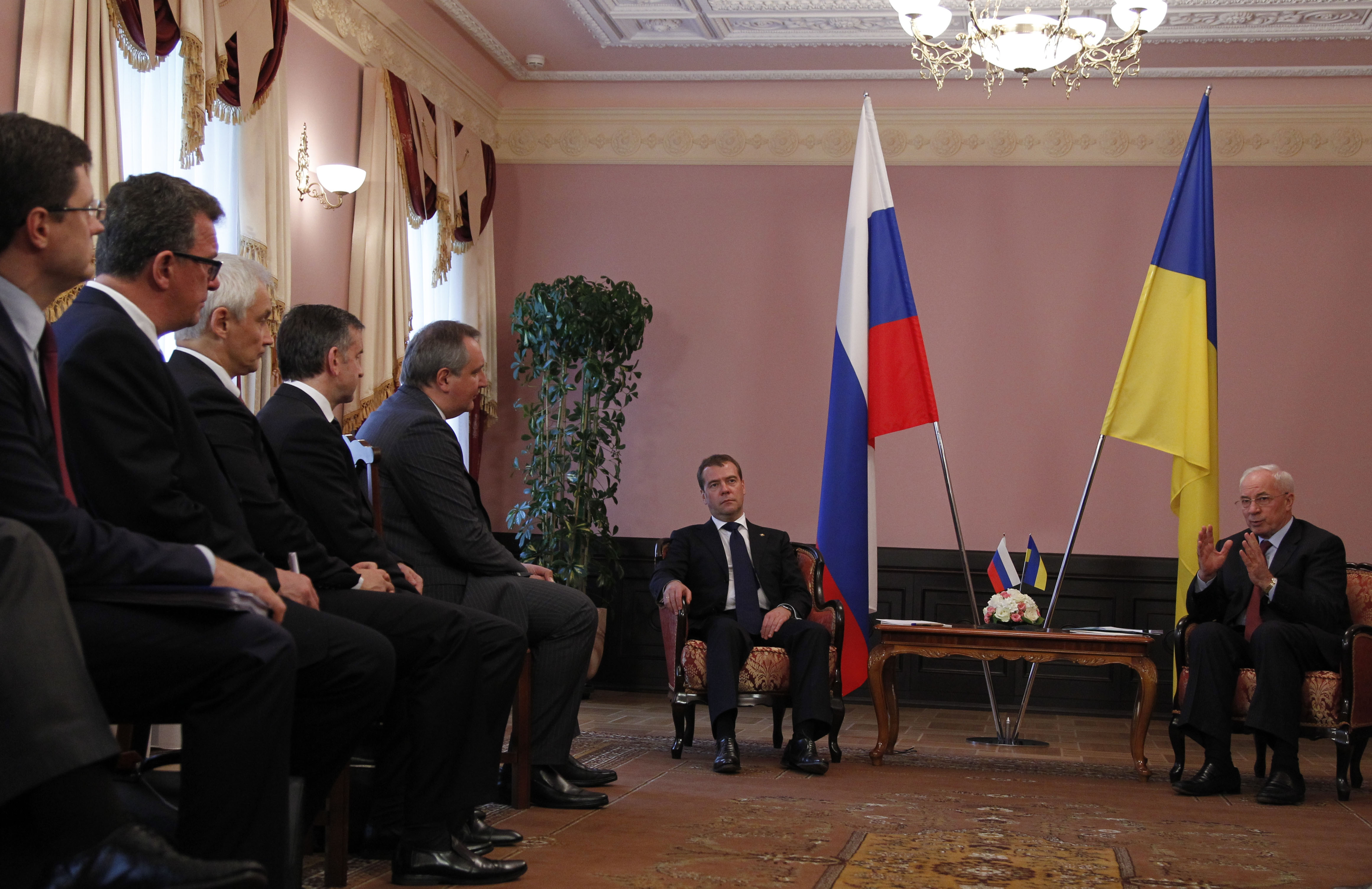
Belousov, third from the left, during Prime Minister Medvedev's state visit to Ukraine on 27 June 2012

On 21 May 2012, he was appointed Minister of Economic Development to the Cabinet led by Prime Minister Dmitry Medvedev, succeeding Elvira Nabiullina.

He is considered a Keynesian economist who believes in state intervention in the economy.

=== Presidential administration (2013–2020) ===
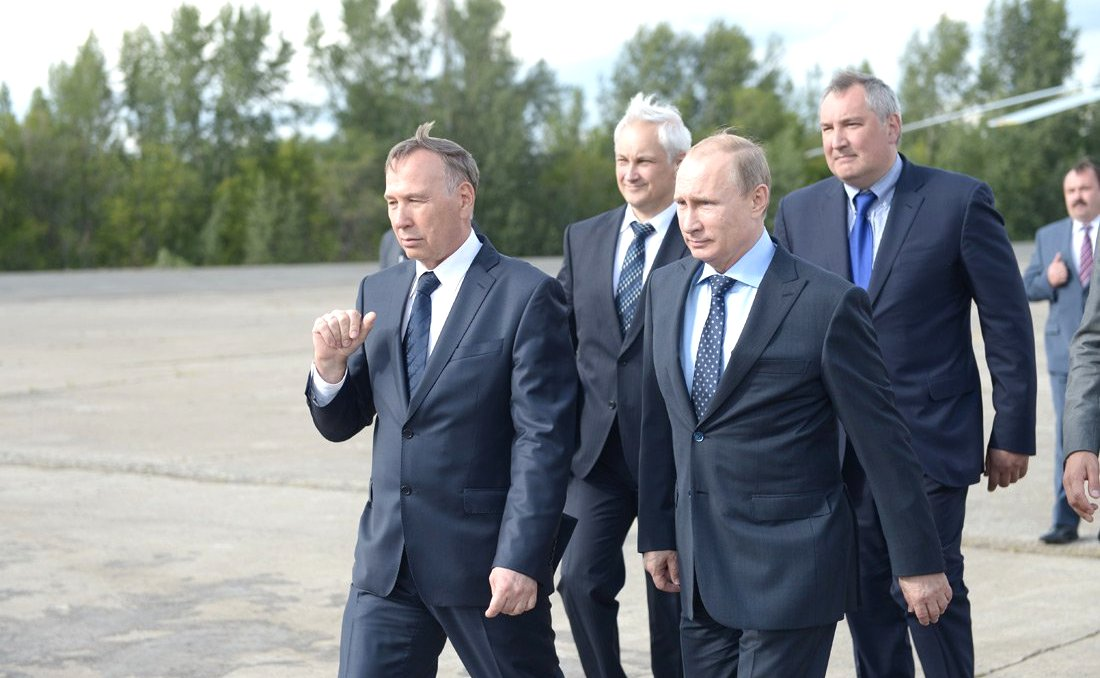
Belousov with Vladimir Putin and Dmitry Rogozin on 21 July 2014

On 24 June 2013, he was appointed as Vladimir Putin's Presidential aide for economic affairs.

Belousov was Putin's only economic adviser who supported the Russian annexation of Crimea in 2014. He believed Russia was "encircled by enemies".

=== First Deputy Prime Minister of Russia (2020–2024) ===
On 21 January 2020, Belousov was appointed as First Deputy Prime Minister of Russia in Mikhail Mishustin's Cabinet. From 30 April to 19 May 2020, Belousov was appointed by Vladimir Putin as acting Prime Minister of Russia, temporarily replacing Mikhail Mishustin, after the latter was diagnosed with Covid-19. According to Politico, he is a possible successor to Putin.

=== Minister of defence (2024–present) ===
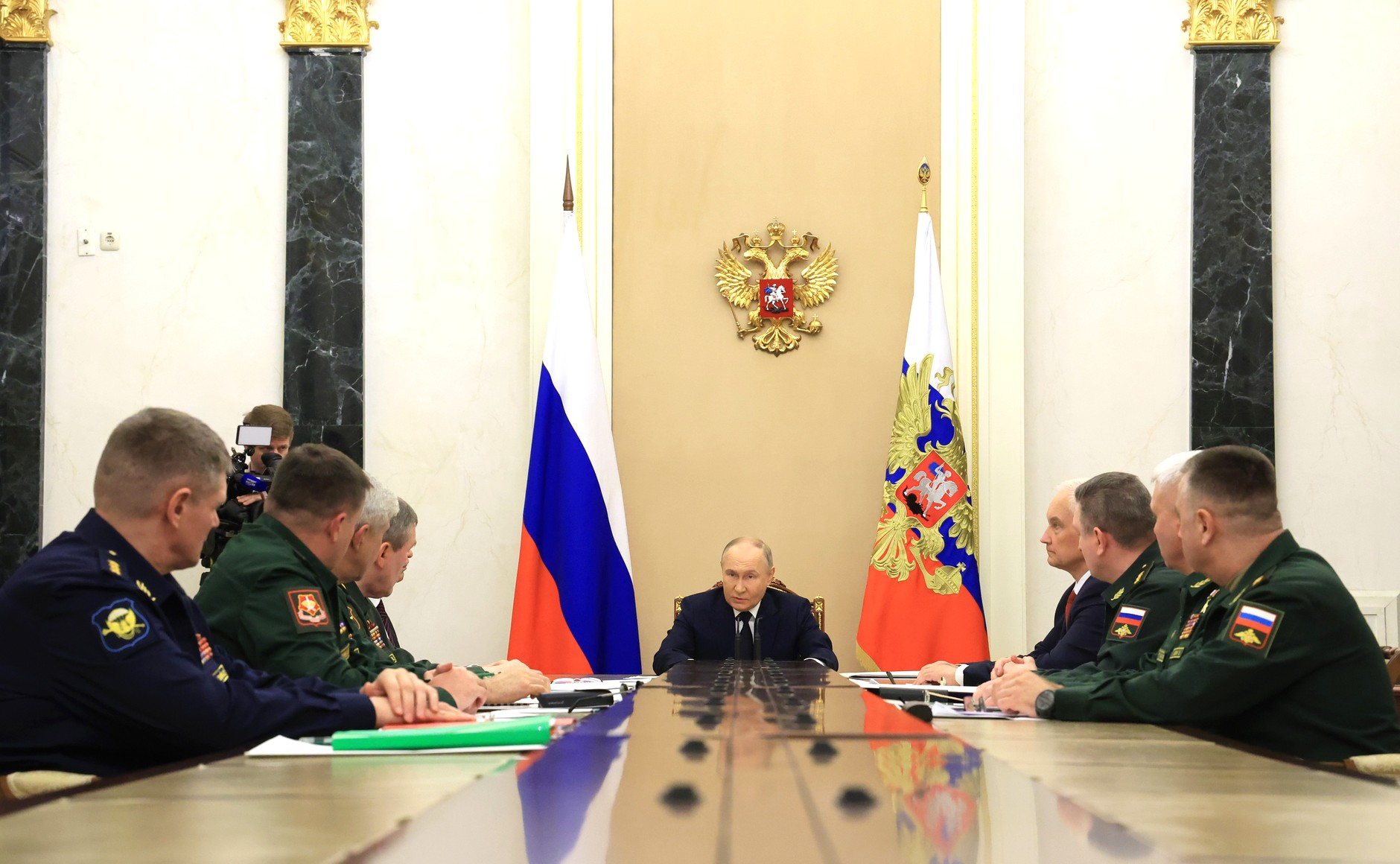
Putin's meeting with Belousov and commanders of Russia's military districts, 15 May 2024

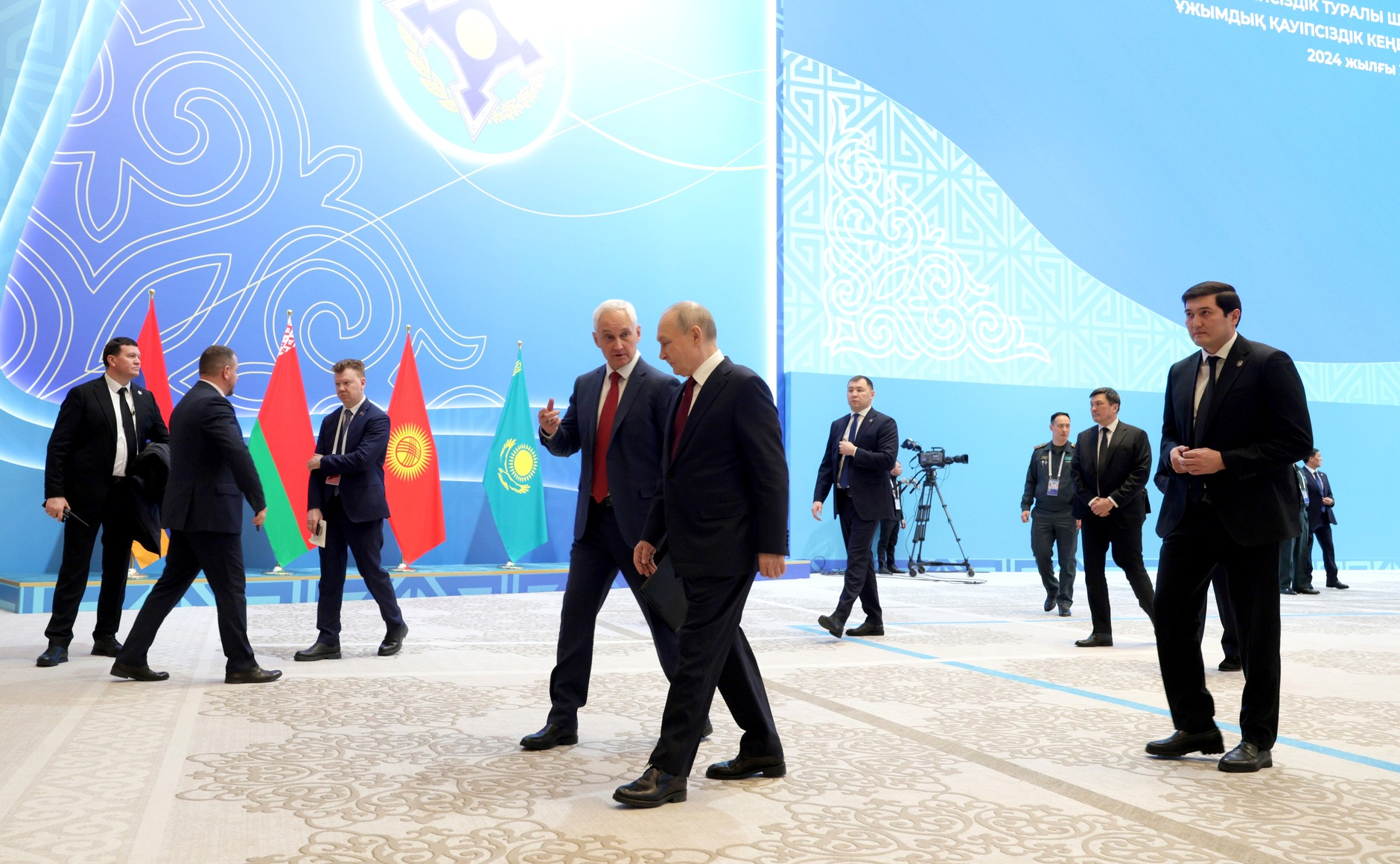
Belousov and Putin at the CSTO Summit in Astana, Kazakhstan, 28 November 2024

On 12 May 2024, President Putin appointed Belousov as Minister of Defence, replacing Sergei Shoigu, effective 14 May 2024.

Jimmy Rushton, a Kyiv-based security analyst, said on X, formerly Twitter, that Shoigu's replacement with Belousov signals that Putin believes he will win "via outproducing (and outlasting) Ukraine" and is "preparing for many more years of war". Alexandra Prokopenko, a fellow at the Carnegie Russia Eurasia Center, said that Putin sees the war in Ukraine as a war of attrition and Belousov is supposed to help transform Russia's already heavily militarised economy into a war economy. As of 2024, military spending accounts for about 30% of Russia's budget.

Following his appointment as Minister of Defence in May 2024, Belousov stated that Russia's main task was to achieve victory in Ukraine while minimizing Russian military casualties. He also emphasized the need for greater efficiency, innovation, and the development of new methods of warfare. Addressing lawmakers during his confirmation process, he said that he had always been guided by the principle that "you can make mistakes, but you cannot lie".

In July 2024, he held talks with Indonesian Defence Minister and President-elect Prabowo Subianto. Belousov called Indonesia one of Russia's key partners in the Asia-Pacific region. In August 2024, he held talks in Moscow on strengthening military cooperation with the Defence Ministers of Vietnam, Myanmar, Laos, Mali, and the Central African Republic.

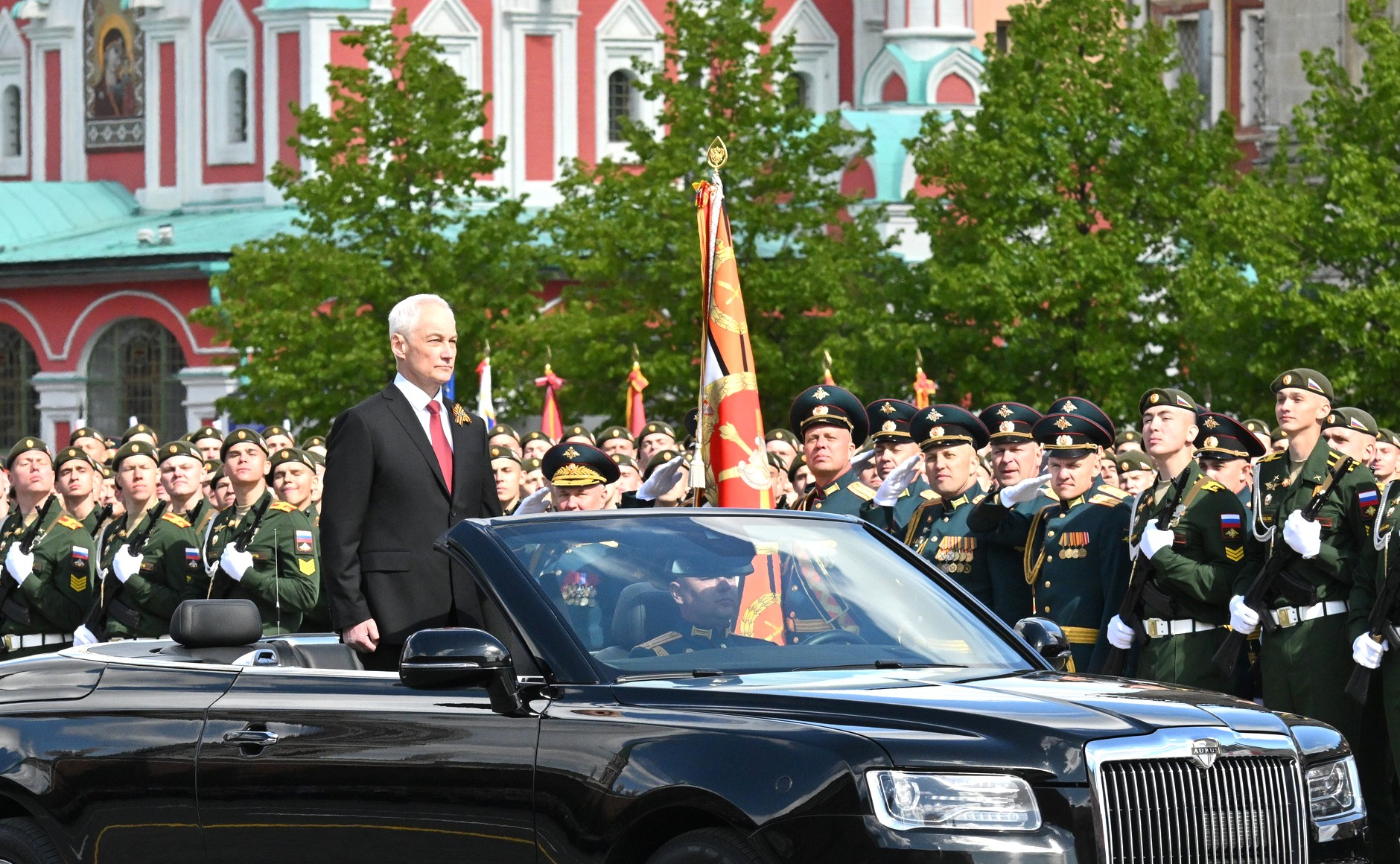
Belousov during the 2025 Moscow Victory Day Parade

On 14 October 2024, he arrived in Beijing, China. Belousov and Chinese Defence Minister Dong Jun called for the two sides to "deepen strategic collaboration" and "continuously advance military relations." On 10 December 2024, Belousov held talks with Indian Defence Minister Rajnath Singh. Singh reaffirmed India's commitment to strengthening defence ties with Russia.

In December 2024, Belousov highlighted the extensive use of unmanned aerial vehicles (UAVs) by Russian forces, stating that over 3,500 drones are deployed on the battlefield daily.

On 16 December 2024, Belousov said at a joint meeting with Putin that Russia should prepare for multiple scenarios, including a war with NATO, in the next decade. He also said that Russia aims to achieve victory in the war against Ukraine and fully conquer Ukraine's Donetsk, Kherson, Luhansk and Zaporizhzhia regions by 2025. Belousov claimed that Ukraine had lost "almost 1 million people" during the war with Russia.

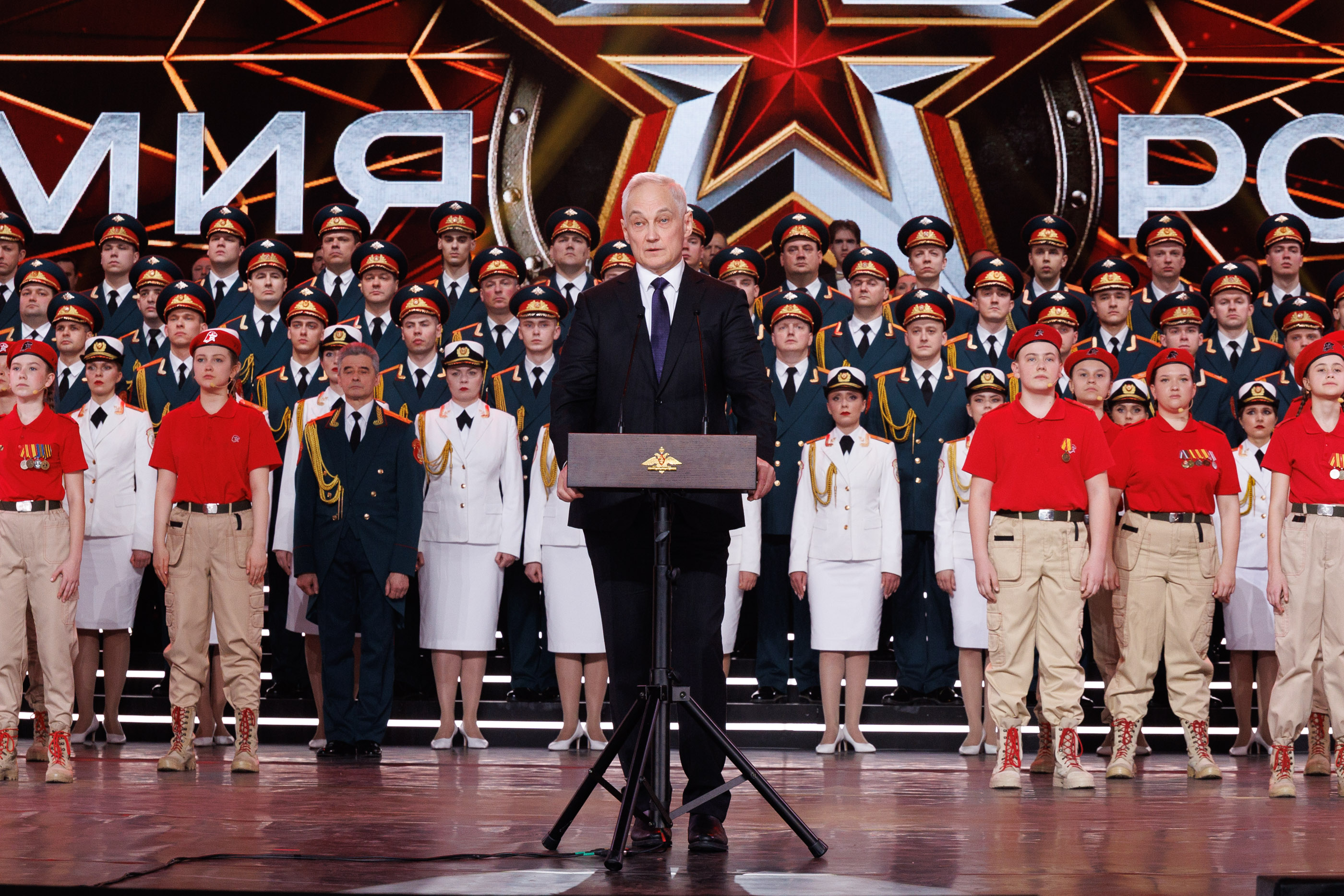
Belousov at a Defender of the Fatherland Day gala concert, with members of the Young Army Cadets National Movement and Russian servicemen in the background, 23 February 2026

At a Shanghai Cooperation Organisation defence ministers’ meeting in Qingdao, China, in June 2025, Belousov stated that Israeli and United States strikes on Iranian military facilities and infrastructure constituted a “gross violation of the UN Charter and international law”. He said Russia strongly condemned the attacks and expressed condolences to Iran for casualties resulting from the conflict, and that Russia was prepared to help de-escalate the situation and offer mediation. He also referred to the situation in the Gaza Strip as a “humanitarian disaster”.

In November 2025, Belousov supported preparations for the possible resumption of Russian nuclear weapons testing, citing developments in the United States and the need to assess Russia's strategic capabilities.

At a Shanghai Cooperation Organisation defence ministers’ meeting in Bishkek, Kyrgyzstan, in April 2026, Belousov warned against what he described as attempts by non-regional states to expand their military presence in Central Asia, stating that Russia viewed such activity as unacceptable. He further stated that instability in the Middle East, including in Syria, Lebanon, Afghanistan, and Gaza, could spread beyond the region and affect neighbouring states. Belousov also argued that United States activity in the Asia-Pacific region was destabilising. He said that efforts to reshape the regional security architecture into a U.S.-centred model through the strengthening of military-political structures under Washington’s control “provoke tensions, undermine regional stability, and increase the risk of armed conflict”. In November 2026, Belousov visited China, where he met with Central Military Commission Vice Chairman Zhang Shengmin in Beijing.

== Sanctions ==
In relation to the Russian invasion of Ukraine, Belousov is under sanctions of Ukraine, the European Union, the United States, Japan, Canada, the United Kingdom, Australia, and New Zealand.

== Personal life ==
Belousov has been married twice. He is fond of the history of painting. He is an Orthodox believer and regularly attends church. In his youth, he practiced karate and sambo, but nowadays he is engaged in athletics.

His son graduated from the Bauman Moscow State Technical University.

== Awards ==
- Honoured Economist of the Russian Federation (2007)
- Order of Honour (2009)

== Bibliography ==
- Эволюция системы воспроизводства российской экономики: от кризиса к развитию (English: The evolution of the system of the reproduction of the Russian economy: from crisis to development) (Moscow. 2006. ISBN 5-317-01601-0)
