= Ministry of Crimean Affairs =

Russian former government ministry

- Министерство Российской Федерации по делам Крыма

Agency overview
- Formed: March 31, 2014
- Preceding agency: none
- Dissolved: July 15, 2015
- Jurisdiction: Government of Russia
- Headquarters: Moscow
- Minister responsible: Oleg Savelyev, Minister for Crimean Affairs
- Agency executive: Dmitry Kozak, Curator for Crimean Affairs
- Website: mincrimea.gov.ru

The Ministry of Crimean Affairs (Russian: Министерство Российской Федерации по делам Крыма (Минкрым России), romanized: Ministerstvo Rossiyskoy Federatsii po delam Kryma (Minkrym Rossii)) was a federal ministry in Dmitry Medvedev's government which was established on March 31, 2014; and dissolved on July 15, 2015.

The ministry was responsible for the integration of the Republic of Crimea and the city of Sevastopol into Russia's economic, financial, credit and legal systems, and as well as the economic and social development of Republic of Crimea and Sevastopol City. The ministry was formed by Presidential decree of Vladimir Putin, who appointed the economist Oleg Savelyev as the federal minister with responsibility for the economic and social development of the region.

== Background ==
On 11 March 2014, the Crimean parliament and the Sevastopol City Council issued a letter of intent to unilaterally declare independence from Ukraine. The document specifically mentioned Kosovo as a precedent in the lead part. The declaration was made in an attempt to legitimize a referendum on the status of Crimea where citizens were to vote on whether Crimea should apply to join Russia as a federal subject of the Russian Federation, or remain part of Ukraine.

On 16 March 2014, a large majority (reported as 96.77% of those 81.36% of the population of Crimea who voted) voted in favour of independence of Crimea from Ukraine and joining Russia as a federal subject. After the referendum, Crimean lawmakers formally voted both to secede from Ukraine and ask for membership in the Russian Federation. The Sevastopol City Council, however, requested the port's separate admission as a federal city.

On 18 March 2014, the self-proclaimed independent Republic of Crimea signed a treaty of accession to the Russian Federation. The accession was granted but separately for each the former regions that composed it: one accession for the Autonomous Republic of Crimea as a federal subject, and another accession for Sevastopol as a federal city. The newly formed federal subject comprising the former Autonomous Republic of Crimea now bears the name Republic of Crimea — the same name as the short-lived, self-proclaimed independent republic. During the transition period, which lasted until January 1, 2015, both sides resolved the issues of integration of the new subjects "in the economic, financial, credit and legal system of the Russian Federation". The accession has been recognized internationally by only a few states.

On 19 March 2014, the Ukrainian military began to withdraw from Crimea, and on 31 March the Ministry for Crimea Affairs was established. It was later dissolved on 15 July 2015, following executive orders signed by Putin, and passed all its powers to the Economic Development Ministry.

== Management ==
=== Minister ===
- Oleg Savelyev (March 31, 2014 – July 15, 2015)

=== Curator ===
- Dmitry Kozak (March 2014-July 15, 2015)

== See also ==
- Ministry for Development of Russian Far East
- Annexation of Crimea by the Russian Federation
