= Sergey Donskoy =

Russian politician

- Сергей Донской
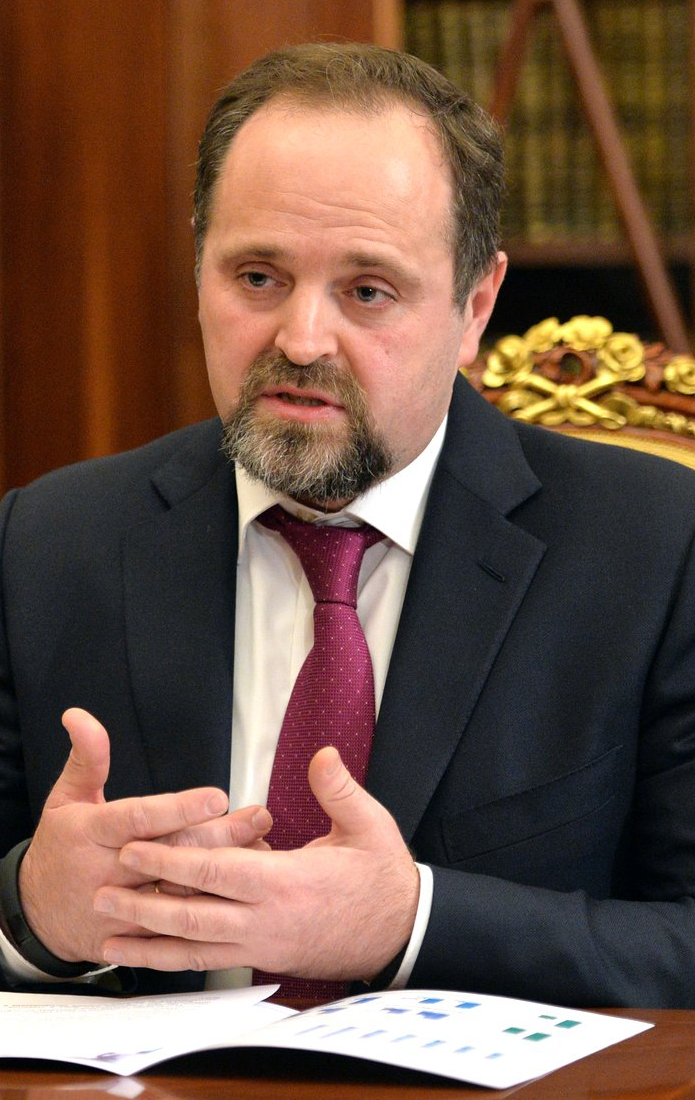
- Donskoy in 2015

Minister of Natural Resources and Environment
- In office 21 May 2012 – 7 May 2018
- Prime Minister: Dmitry Medvedev
- Preceded by: Yury Trutnev
- Succeeded by: Dmitry Kobylkin

Personal details
- Born: 13 October 1968 (age 58) Elektrostal, Soviet Union
- Education: Gubkin Russian State University of Oil and Gas

Sergey Yefimovich Donskoy (Russian: Серге́й Ефимович Донской; born 13 October 1968) is a Russian politician, and from May 2012 to May 2018, served as the Minister of Natural Resources and Environment of Russia.

He was born in Elektrostal. In 1992, he finished his studies in Gubkin Russian State University of Oil and Gas. On May 21, he was appointed to the role of Minister of Natural Resources and Environment of Russia in Dmitry Medvedev's Cabinet.
