= Maxim Topilin =

Russian politician; Minister of Labour and Social Affairs (2012-2020)

Maxim Topilin MP
- Максим Топилин
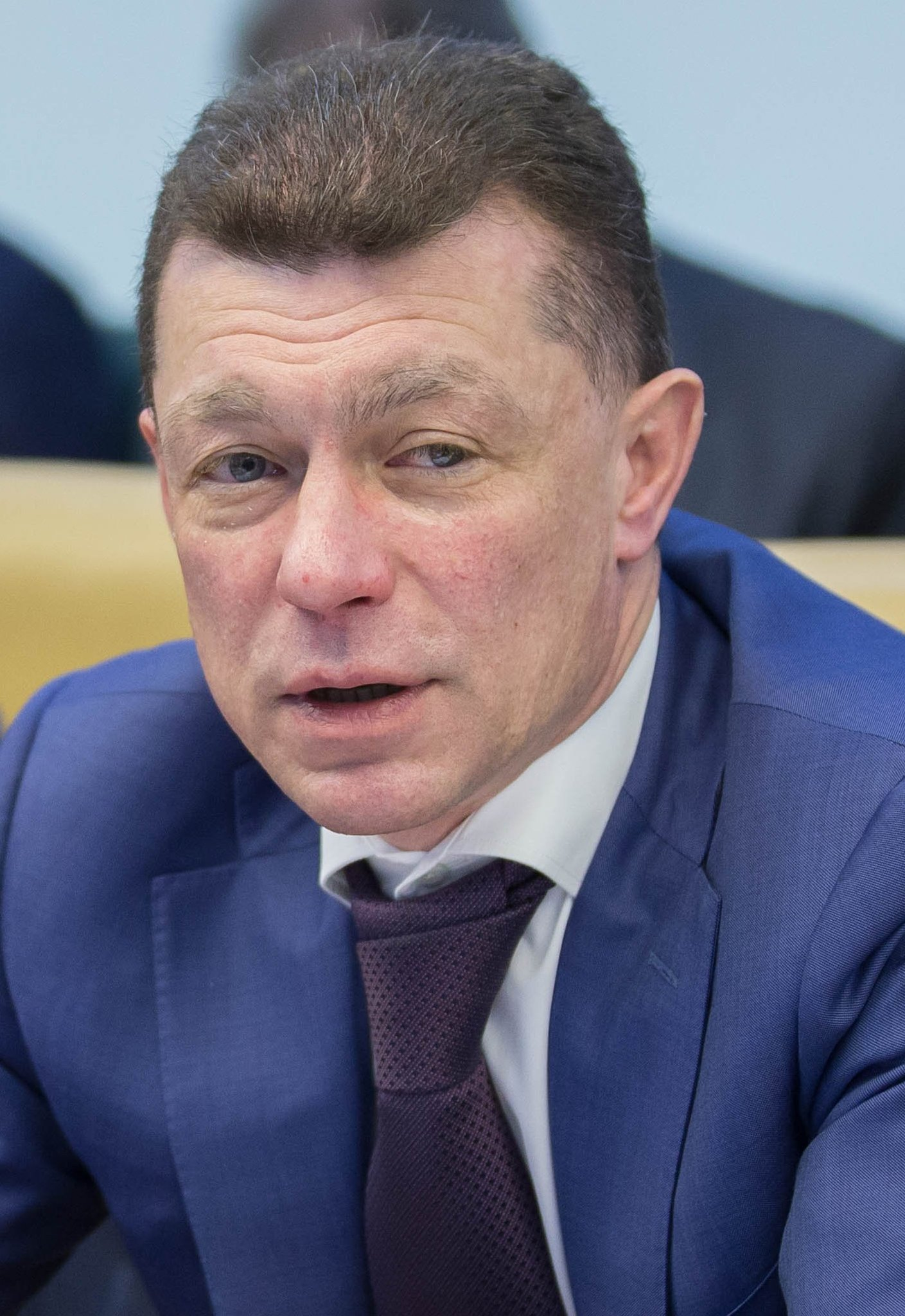
- Topilin in 2017

Member of the State Duma (Party List seat)
- Incumbent
- Assumed office 12 October 2021

Minister of Labour and Social Protection
- In office 21 May 2012 – 15 January 2020
- Prime Minister: Dmitry Medvedev
- Preceded by: Tatyana Golikova
- Succeeded by: Anton Kotyakov

Personal details
- Born: 19 April 1967 (age 59) Moscow, RSFSR, USSR
- Party: United Russia
- Spouse: Maria Topilina
- Children: 2 daughters
- Education: Plekhanov Institute (DPhil)
- Occupation: economist

Maxim Anatolievich Topilin (Russian: Максим Анатольевич Топилин; born 19 April 1967) is a Russian economist. He has the federal state civilian service rank of 1st class Active State Councillor of the Russian Federation.

From May 2012 to January 2020 he served as the Minister of Labour and Social Affairs of the Russian Federation. From January 2020 till February 2021 he was a head of the Pension Fund of the Russian Federation.

In the period from 1994 to 2001 he worked in the Office of the Prime Minister. He was specialist expert and in 1996-1997 he was consultant to the Department of Labor and Health.

On 15 January 2020, he resigned as part of the cabinet, after President Vladimir Putin delivered the Presidential Address to the Federal Assembly, in which he proposed several amendments to the constitution.

On 22 January 2020 Topilin was appointed chairman of the Pension Fund of the Russian Federation.

On 11 February 2021 Kommersant reported that Topilin had resigned from his post as head of the PFR. The resignation is associated with the upcoming reorganization of the social security system.

Russian Railways may become a new place of employment for Topilin, it is assumed that he will become an advisor to CEO Oleg Belozyorov (confirmed).

At the June congress of United Russia, Topilin was included in the top five list of candidates from Tatarstan in the elections to the State Duma in 2021. This practically guaranteed election.

== Family ==
Maxim Topilin is married. Wife - Maria Topilina, businesswoman. In 2018, she declared an income significantly exceeding her husband's salary (RUB 16.6 million vs RUB 6.9 million). The Topilins have two daughters.

== Sanctions ==
He was sanctioned by Canada under the Special Economic Measures Act (S.C. 1992, c. 17) in relation to the Russian invasion of Ukraine for Grave Breach of International Peace and Security, and by the UK government in 2022 in relation to Russo-Ukrainian War.

== Awards ==
- 2008/11/17 - Order of Courage. For the courage and dedication shown in providing medical assistance to the victims of the Georgian-South Ossetian conflict.
- 2015/05/08 - Medal "For Contribution to the Creation of the Eurasian Economic Union", II degree.
- 2017/04/19 - Order For Services to the Republic of Dagestan. For a great contribution to the social and economic development of the Republic of Dagestan.
