= Alexey Ulyukaev =

Russian politician (born 1956)

- Алексей Улюкаев
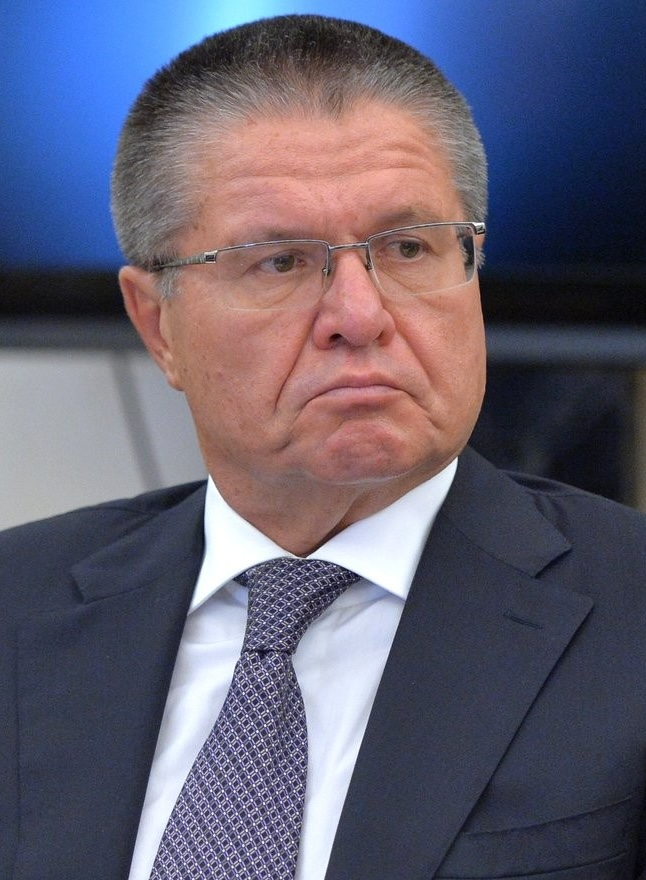
- Ulyukaev in 2016

Minister of Economic Development
- In office 24 June 2013 – 15 November 2016
- Prime Minister: Dmitry Medvedev
- Preceded by: Andrey Belousov
- Succeeded by: Maxim Oreshkin

Personal details
- Born: Alexey Valentinovich Ulyukaev; 23 March 1956 (age 70) Moscow, Russian SFSR, Soviet Union
- Education: Moscow State University

Alexey Valentinovich Ulyukaev (Russian: Алексе́й Валенти́нович Улюка́ев, IPA: [ɐlʲɪkˈsʲej vəlʲɪnʲˈtʲinəvʲɪtɕ ʊlʲʊˈka(j)ɪf]; born 23 March 1956) is a Russian politician, scientist, and economist. He has the federal state civilian service rank of 1st class Active State Councillor of the Russian Federation.

Between 24 June 2013 and 15 November 2016, he held the office of Minister of Economic Development of the Russian Federation in Dmitry Medvedev's Cabinet. From 2004 to 2013, he held the post of Deputy Chairman of the Central Bank of Russia.

He holds a Doctorate of Economic Sciences.

He served part of an eight-year prison term in a penal colony on the outskirts of Tver for soliciting a large bribe.

== Career and education ==
Ulyukaev studied economics at Lomonosov Moscow State University. He graduated in 1979 and received Doctor of Science (Economics) in 1982.

For the next six years he worked for the Moscow Institute of Construction Engineers.

From 1992 to 1994, Ulyukayev held various positions in the Office of the Prime Minister.

He used to work as the deputy director at the Institute of Economic Problems of the Transitional Period from 1994 to 1996 and from 1998 to 2000.

In the interim, from 1996 to 1998, he worked in the Moscow City Duma.

In 2000 Ulyukaev was appointed First Deputy Finance Minister.

From 2004 to 2013 he served as the First Deputy Chairman of the Central Bank of Russia.

In June 2013 Ulyukaev was appointed Minister of Economic Development and held this position until his arrest in November 2016.

== Arrest and investigation ==
The Investigative Committee of Russia announced that Ulyukaev had been detained in November 2016 due to allegations that he received a $2 million bribe for an assessment that led to the Kremlin-controlled oil company Rosneft's acquisition of a 50% stake in Bashneft. This followed an apparent sting operation after months of surveillance. On the same day, Vladimir Putin dismissed him from the ministerial position. His trial commenced in August 2017.

The organizer of this apparent sting was Rosneft chief and Putin confidant Igor Sechin. Sechin, a key witness in the trial, was summoned four times by the defence, but refused to be cross-examined. Ulyukayev compared his prosecution to the show trials of the 1930s.

On 15 December 2017, Ulyukaev was found guilty and sentenced to eight years in a strict-regime labour colony and fined 130 million roubles.

On 27 April 2022, a court in the city of Tver satisfied Ulyukaev's request for parole. He was released in May 2022.
