= Vladimir Puchkov =

Russian politician

- Владимир Пучков
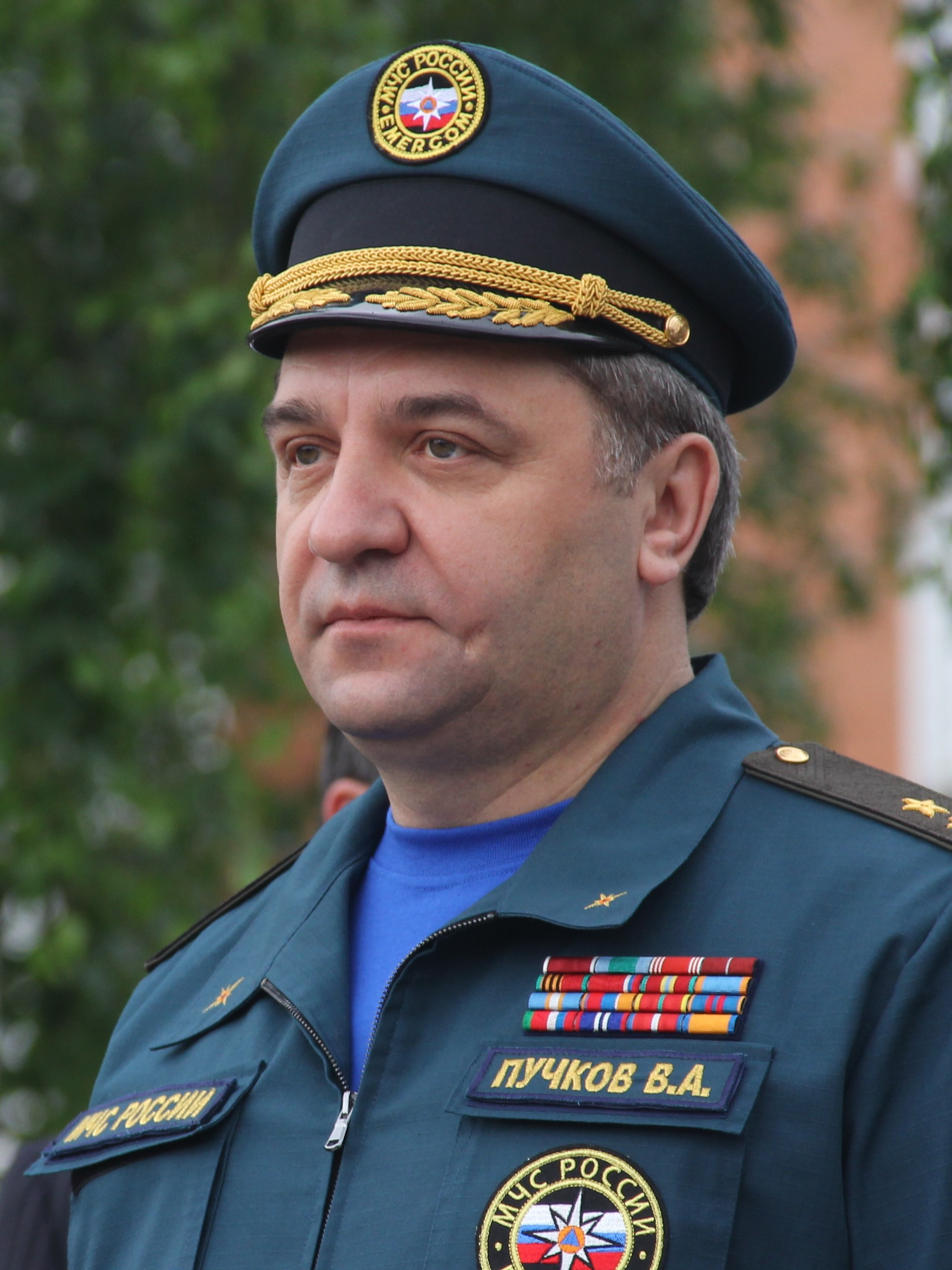
- Puchkov in 2012

Minister of Emergency Situations
- In office 17 May 2012 – 18 May 2018
- President: Vladimir Putin
- Prime Minister: Dmitry Medvedev
- Preceded by: Sergey Shoygu
- Succeeded by: Yevgeny Zinichev

Personal details
- Born: January 1, 1959 (age 67) Novinka, Volgograd Oblast, Russian SFSR
- Party: Communist Party of the Soviet Union (Before 1991); Independent (1991–present)
- Education: High Military Engineering Command School
- Profession: Civil engineer, civil servant
- Website: Ministry of Emergency Situations (Russia)

Vladimir Andreyevich Puchkov (Russian: Владимир Андреевич Пучков; born 1 January 1959) is a Russian politician who served as Minister of Emergency Situations from May 2012 to May 2018.

He holds the military rank of General Lieutenant and the federal state civilian service rank of 1st class Active State Councillor of the Russian Federation.

== Biography ==
=== Education ===
In 1979, he graduated from Tyumen High Military Engineering Command School (Тюменское высшее военно-инженерное командное училище). He attended the Kuybishev Military Engineering Academy (Военно-инженерную академию им. В. В. Куйбышева) in 1988, from which he graduated in 1991 with specialty in Command Staff of Civil Defense. In 2000, he graduated from the Russian Academy for State Service under the President of Russia, with specialty as Manager for Municipal Management.

=== Career ===
- 1979-1983 — Served in the Engineering Troops in Far East Military District of the Soviet Army.
- 1983-1986 — Senior Officer of Civil Defense Command (in Kungur, Perm region).
- 1991-1994 — Teacher of Military courses in Civil Defense affairs.
- 1995-1997 — Head of Science research Management of the All-Russian Institute of Science Research for Civil Defense and Emergencies Situations.
- 1997-1999 — Deputy of Head Department for Activities of Population and Territory Protection of the Ministry for Emergencies Situations (МЧС России).
- 1999-2003 — Deputy Head Department of Civil Defense.
- 2003-2004 — Head Department of Civil Defense.
- 2004-2006 — Director for Civil Defense Department of the Emergencies Ministry.
- 2006-2007 — Head of North-West Regional Center of the Emergencies Control Ministry.
- 2007-2012 — State Secretary - Deputy Minister for Civil Defense, Emergencies and Elimination of Consequences of Natural Disasters.
- Since 2012 — Minister for Civil Defense, Emergencies and Elimination of Consequences of Natural Disasters.

== Awards ==
- Medal "200 Years of the Ministry of Defence" (Ministry of Defence)
- Awards of the Ministry for Emergency Situations of Russia
- Order of Friendship
- Order for Personal Courage
- Order of Courage

Political offices
Preceded by Sergey Shoygu	Minister of Emergency Situations; 2012–2018	Succeeded by Yevgeny Zinichev
