= Buildings of the Northern Insurance Company =

Historic buildings in Moscow, Russia

- Здания Северного страхового общества
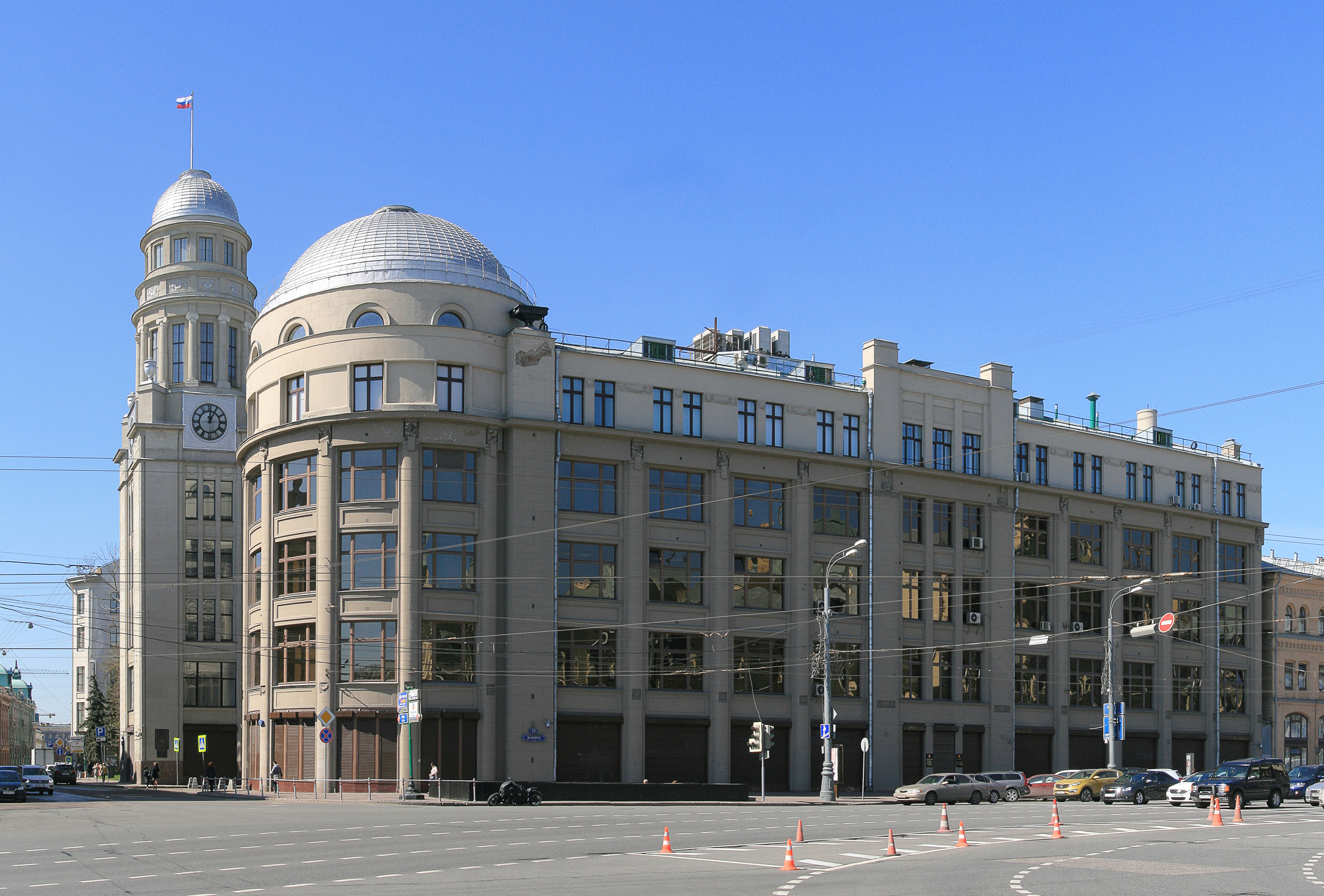
- Interactive map of Buildings of the Northern Insurance Company
- Location: Moscow, Ilyinka Street, 21–23
- Coordinates: 55°45′23″N 37°37′46″E
- Designer: I. I. Rerberg; M. M. Peretyatkovich; V. K. Oltarzhevsky; I. A. Golosov
- Beginning date: 1910
- Completion date: 1911

The Buildings of the Northern Insurance Company (Russian: Здания Северного страхового общества) is a complex of two houses in the center of Moscow (Ilyinka Street, 21–23). Built in 1910–1911 for the Northern Insurance Company. The buildings have the status of objects of cultural heritage of regional significance.

== History and description ==
At the end of the 19th century, the Northern Insurance Company occupied the house of Orlov-Davydov on Nikolskaya street. In 1900, it was decided to build a complex of profitable houses for society, where offices, retail and storage premises would be located. For this purpose, a plot of land was purchased on the Novaya Ploshad for Kitaigorodskaya Wall. An architectural competition was announced, in which 22 projects took part. The first place was occupied by the project of architects I. I. Rerberg, M. M. Peretyatkovich, V. K. Oltarzhevsky and I. A. Golosov.

The complex of two buildings was organically integrated into the surrounding buildings. The architecture of the eastern part of the complex was influenced by the proximity of the Church of St. Nicholas the Wonderworker "The Great Cross" and the Ilinskiy Gate of Kitay-gorod. The wing of the western contest that ends on Ilyinka ends with a slender clock tower, and the eastern building with a powerful neoclassical rotunda that contrasts with the tower. Five-story buildings have large square office windows. Under the dome of the rotunda there are two belts of small windows: at the top are semicircular, and below them are square ones.

After the October Revolution, the Northern Insurance Company was liquidated. In the 1930s, the building was occupied by the commissariat for foreign trade, committees for arts and higher school affairs. By the early 1990s, the buildings were occupied by the Party Control Committee and the publishing house Moskovsky Rabochiy. Then from 1992 to 2008 the Constitutional Court of the Russian Federation was located here. Currently, the eastern building is occupied by the reception of the Presidential Administration, and the western one by the Ministry of Labor and Social Protection.
