= Oleg Savelyev =

Russian politician

- Олег Савельев
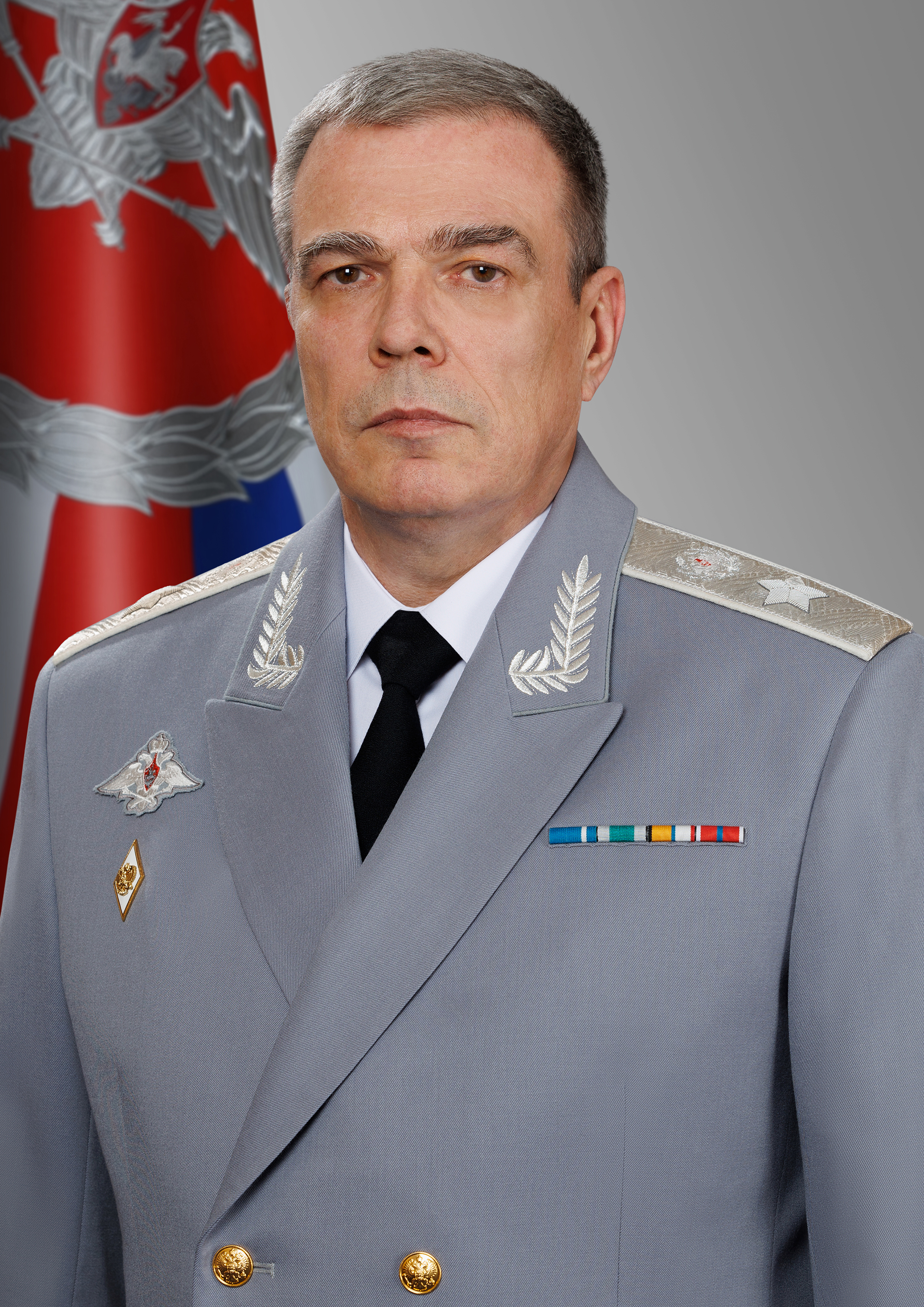
- Official portrait, 2024

Deputy Minister of Defense of Russia
- In office 20 May 2024 – 25 May 2026

Personal details
- Born: 27 October 1965 (age 60) Moscow, Soviet Union
- Education: Leningrad Polytechnic Institute
- Profession: Economist, jurist
- Awards: Order of Honour, Order of Friendship, Medal "For the Return of Crimea"

Military service
- Rank: 1st class Active State Councillor

Oleg Genrikhovich Savelyev (Russian: Олег Генрихович Савельев, born 27 October 1965) is a Russian politician.

He served as Minister for Crimean Affairs (31 March 2014 – 15 June 2015) and as Deputy Minister of Economic Development (2008–2014) of the Government of the Russian Federation.

He has the federal state civilian service rank of 1st class Active State Councillor of the Russian Federation.

== Biography ==
Oleg Savelyev was born 27 October 1965 in Leningrad.

In 1988 he graduated from the radiophysics faculty of the Leningrad Polytechnic Institute. In 1995 he worked as the head of the Centre for Electoral Technologies in the pre-election headquarters of the "Our Home – Russia" Party during the elections to the State Duma. In 1996, during the presidential election campaign, he served as the head PR strategist in the campaign. In 1998, he was the manager of Alexander Lebed's campaign in the elections for Governor of Krasnoyarsk Krai.

From 31 March 2014 until 15 June 2015, he was the Minister for Crimean Affairs.

=== Sanctions ===
He was sanctioned by the UK government in 2014 in relation to the Russo-Ukrainian War.

In June 2014, he was placed on a US sanctions list.
