= Maxim Oreshkin =

Russian politician and economist

Maksim Oreshkin
- Максим Орешкин
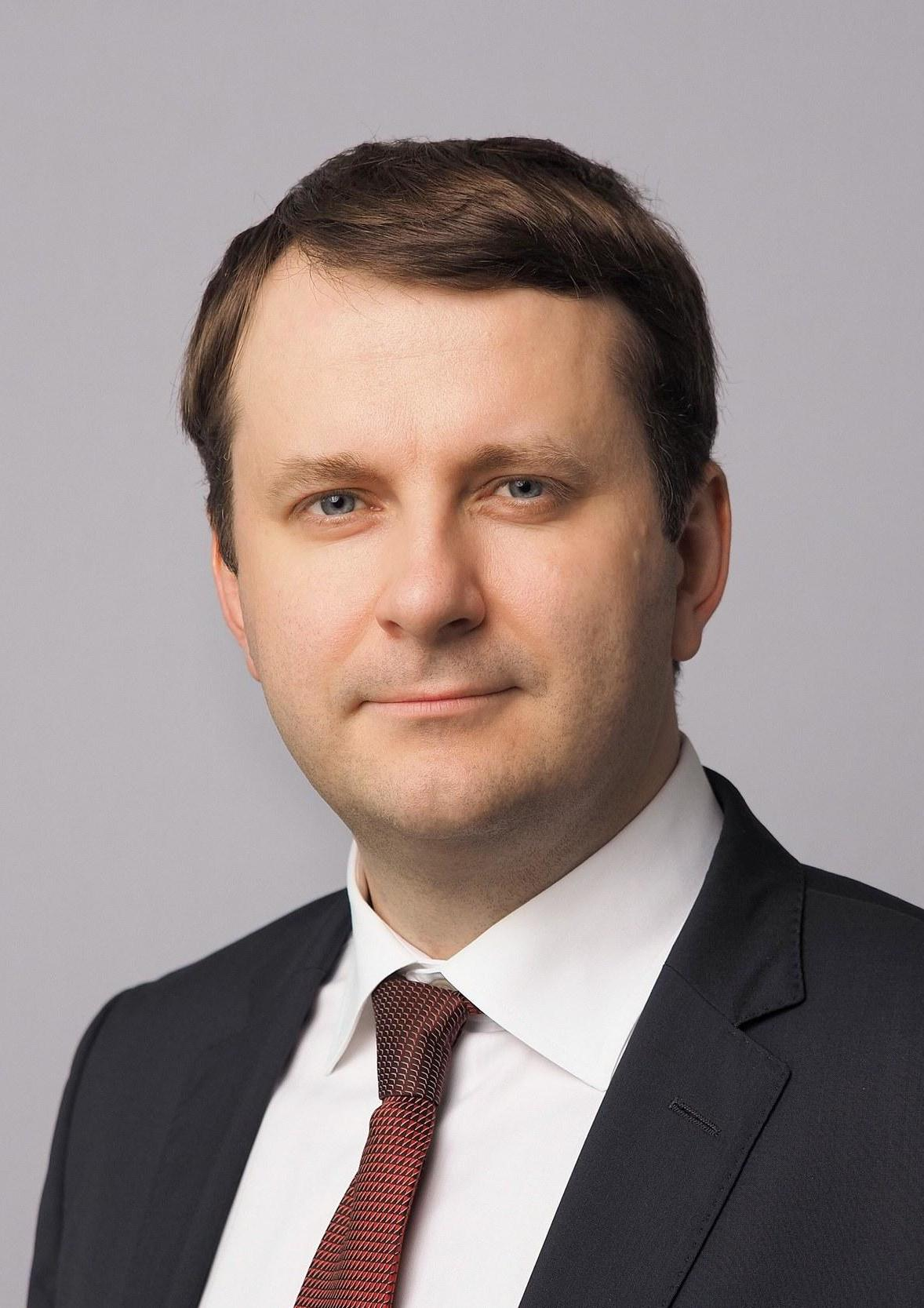
- Official portrait, 2020

Deputy Chief of Staff of the Presidential Executive Office
- Incumbent
- Assumed office 14 May 2024
- President: Vladimir Putin
- Chief of Staff: Anton Vaino

Minister of Economic Development
- In office 11 November 2016 – 15 January 2020
- Prime Minister: Dmitry Medvedev
- Preceded by: Alexey Ulyukaev
- Succeeded by: Maxim Reshetnikov

Personal details
- Born: Maksim Stanislavovich Oreshkin; 21 July 1982 (age 44) Moscow, Russian SFSR, Soviet Union (now Moscow, Russia)
- Education: Higher School of Economics

Maksim Stanislavovich Oreshkin (Russian: Максим Станиславович Орешкин; born 21 July 1982) is a Russian economist and statesman who served as the Minister for Economic Development from 30 November 2016 to 15 January 2020. He has the federal state civilian service rank of 1st class Active State Councillor of the Russian Federation.

== Biography ==
Oreshkin was born on 21 July 1982 in Moscow. He graduated from one of Russia's leading universities – the Higher School of Economics – in 2004 and worked at several major banks, both Russian and foreign-owned.

In September 2013, Oreshkin joined the government as the head of the Directorate for Long-term Strategic planning of the Finance Ministry. In March 2015, he was appointed Deputy Minister of Finance.

On 15 January 2020, he resigned as part of the cabinet, after President Vladimir Putin delivered the Presidential Address to the Federal Assembly, in which he proposed several amendments to the constitution.

On 24 January 2020, he was appointed as Economic Adviser to President of Russia, Vladimir Putin.
