= Ministry of Economic Development (Russia) =

Government minister of Russia

Ministry of Economic Development of the Russian Federation
- Министерство экономического развития Российской Федерации; Ministerstvo ekonomicheskogo razvitiya Rossiiskoi Federatsii
- Ministry Emblem

Agency overview
- Jurisdiction: Government of Russia
- Headquarters: 1,3 1-ya Tverskaya-Yamskaya, Moscow; 55°46′13.48″N 37°35′39.85″E
- Minister responsible: Maxim Reshetnikov
- Child agencies: Federal State Statistics Service; Federal Accreditation Service; Federal Service for Intellectual Property
- Website: economy.gov.ru

The Ministry of Economic Development of the Russian Federation (Russian: Министерство экономического развития Российской Федерации) is a federal ministry in the Russian Government. The ministry is responsible for regulating and forming policies related to socioeconomic and business development in Russia.

== History ==
Andrei Nechayev was the first minister in 1992. He was fired in 1993. Andrei Shapovalyants replaced him.

The Ministry has evolved in function and title over the years. In 1997, what was then known as the Ministry of Economy absorbed the Ministry of Defense, whose functions it carried solo until 1999, when the work of the Ministry of Defense was divided among five agencies.

In 2000, at which point the agency was reconstituted as the Ministry of Economic Development and Trade, Herman Gref was appointed to the role of minister, a title he held until 2007. Gref was succeeded by Elvira Nabiullina in September of that year, and Nabiullina continued in that role until May 2012. During her term, in 2008, the Ministry of Economic Development and Trade transferred its responsibilities for developing policies around and overseeing regulation of trade to the new Ministry of Trade and Industry and was accordingly retitled the Ministry of Economic Development. On 21 May 2012, Andrey Belousov replaced Nabiullina as minister. Minister Yevgeny Yelin was appointed by President Vladimir Putin in November 2016. His predecessor, Alexey Ulyukaev, had been arrested by the FSB for bribery.
