= Sergei Gorkov =

Russian banker and attorney (born 1968)

- Сергей Горьков
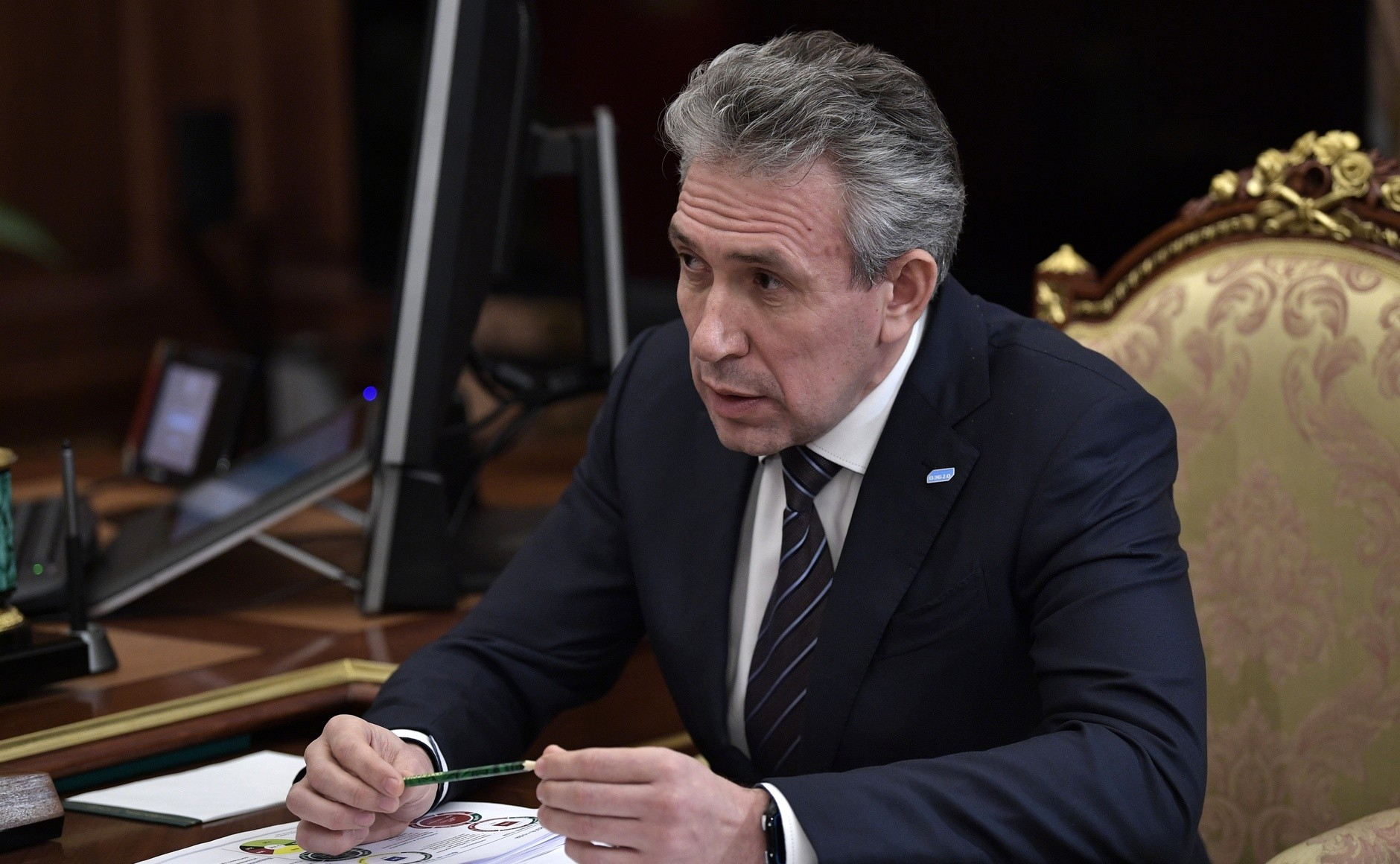
- Gorkov in 2017
- Born: Sergei Nikolayevich Gorkov; 1 December 1968 (age 57); Gai, Orenburg Oblast, USSR
- Education: FSB Academy (BA, 1994); Plekhanov University of Economics (MS, 2002)
- Occupations: Banker; attorney
- Employer: Росгеология
- Spouse: Anna Gorkova
- Children: 3
- Awards: Medal of the Order "For Merit to the Fatherland", II class Certificate of Honor of Russia

Sergei Nikolayevich Gorkov (also tr. Sergey; Russian: Серге́й Никола́евич Горько́в; born 1 December 1968) is a Russian banker and attorney. He is chairman of Vnesheconombank (VEB), a major Russian state-owned bank. Between 2010 and 2016, he was the deputy chairman of Sberbank, Russia's largest bank.

He is a graduate of the Academy of the Federal Counter-Intelligence Service, which prepares members for the Foreign Intelligence Service and Federal Security Service (FSB), and holds a master's degree in economics.

== Early life and education ==
Gorkov was born in Gai, Orenburg Oblast, Soviet Russia, in 1968, to Nikolai Gorkov and Lyubov Gorkova. He has an older brother, Alexei Gorkov (born 1963), who joined the VEB board of directors in January 2017, and a younger sister, Antonina Konoplya (born 1971). In 1994, Sergei graduated with a law degree from the Academy of the Federal Counter-Intelligence Service, which prepares members for the Foreign Intelligence Service and Federal Security Service (FSB). In 2002, he earned a master's degree in economics at the Plekhanov Russian University of Economics. He speaks Russian, English and Arabic.

== Career ==
=== Early career and Yukos ===
Gorkov later worked with Bank Menatep (1994–1997) before joining the Yukos oil company and Yukos Moscow (1997–2005), all of which are now defunct. He was a vice president at Yukos, where he oversaw personnel and pensions. He was also engaged in a social outreach program, Yukos' own youth movement called "New Civilization" (Russian: «Новая Цивилизация»). The movement, which was extremely costly, had a mission to change Russia, and involved summer camps and young people engaging in the political system with their own party and parliament.

In 2003, Yukos began to collapse under a massive tax scandal amid lawsuits against the Russian government. Forbes stated it was a large mystery how Gorkov managed to avoid arrest, but inside sources (including Pavel Ivlev) stated it was through his connections with the Kremlin and the FSB. Yukos CEO Mikhail Khodorkovsky, an enemy of Russian leader Vladimir Putin, was imprisoned for eight years for fraud and tax evasion, a conviction that drew skepticism in the West. Gorkov's subordinate, Alexei Kurtsin, was sentenced to 15 years in prison for embezzlement and served eight.

In 2005, after the Yukos fiasco, Gorkov moved to London, where he worked with several companies. He sat on the board of directors for Eton Energy Ltd. and for liquor company New Muscovy Company Ltd. Gorkov returned to Russia in 2006. From 2005 to 2008, he sat on the board of directors of FESCO Transport Group, Russia's largest intermodal transport operator.

=== Sberbank ===
Gorkov moved into the banking sector in November 2008, when he joined the state-owned Sberbank as director of personnel. During the recession, Gorkov oversaw an overhaul of the workforce, reducing the number of employees from 270,000 to 240,000 to increase efficiency and profit. He also led a retraining program, with 200,000 of the employees receiving some form of retraining, and introduced an employee evaluation system that led to monthly bonuses for the best employees.

Gorkov was tremendously successful during his first five years at Sberbank; Gorkov was appointed deputy chairman of the board of Sberbank in October 2010. He was promoted to run its international operations division and helped it expand its business reach from two countries to 20. Its international expansion included acquisitions of Volksbank of Austria and DenizBank of Turkey. Starting in October 2012, Gorkov was chairman of Sberbank's division in Kazakhstan.

=== VEB ===
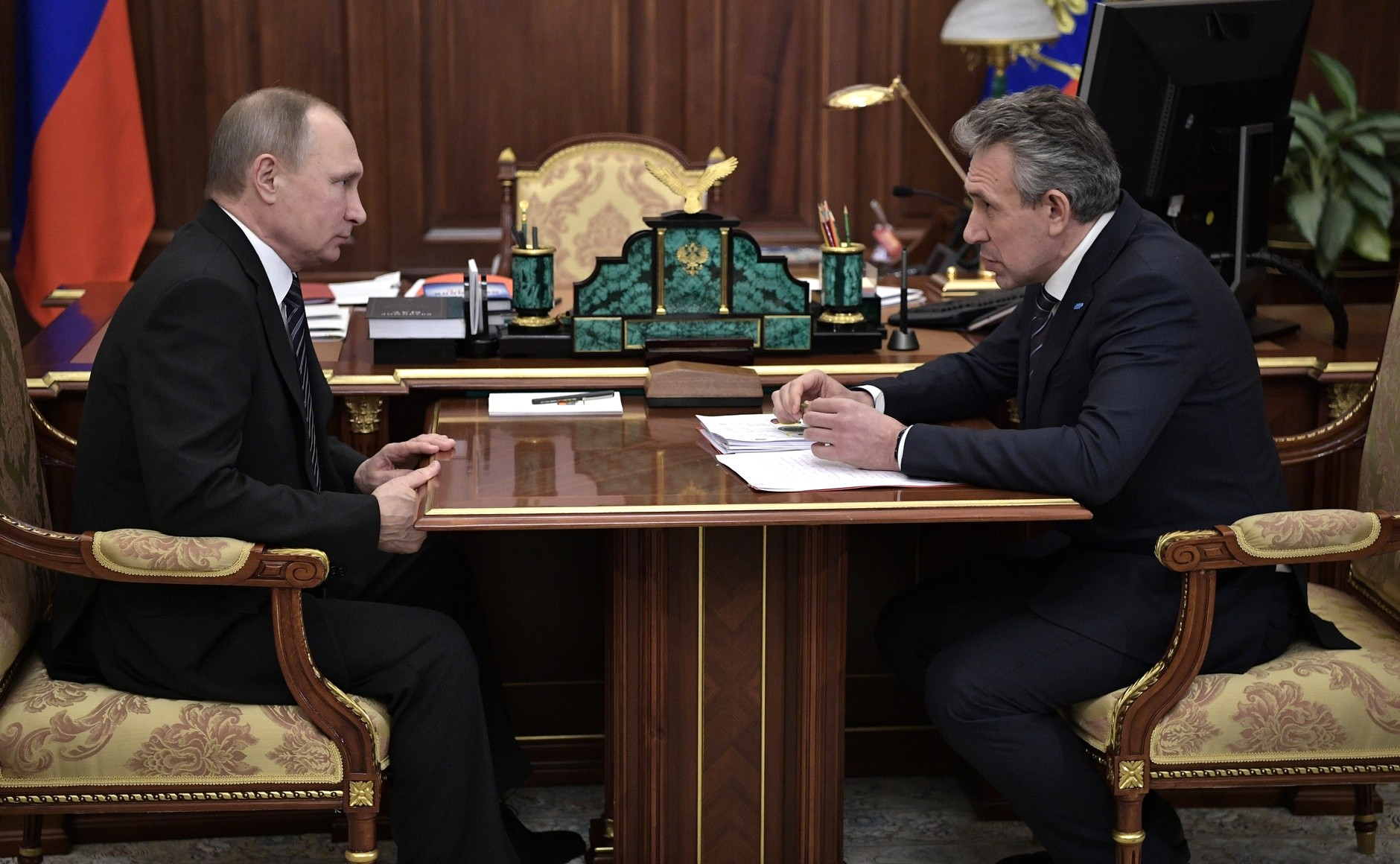
Russian President Vladimir Putin and Gorkov meet at the Kremlin, February 2017

In February 2016, Russian President Vladimir Putin promoted Gorkov to chairman of Vnesheconombank (VEB), succeeding Vladimir Dmitriev. According to Russian sources, Gorkov's connection to the FSB played a part in his appointment to lead VEB; Putin, the former director of the FSB, has appointed several of its members to important roles in Russian government. Founded in 1922, Vnesheconombank is one of the oldest banks in Russia, but was acquired as a state development bank in 2007. During the 2008 financial crisis, Vnesheconombank's status as a state-owned bank forced it to assist the government with the domestic economy. It reorganized struggling banks, purchased two steel companies, bought 175 billion rubles (approximately $3 billion) of sagging shares of Russian companies to keep them afloat, and also heavily invested in struggling Ukrainian banks.

VEB, which has been dubbed Vladimir Putin's "pet bank" and "slush fund" by Western observers, also lent significantly for the 2014 Winter Olympics in Sochi, covertly funded pro-Russian groups in Ukraine, and has frequently bailed out Russian oligarchs close to Putin. According to Foreign Policy's assessment, VEB "functions as an off-the-books kitty that allows President Vladimir Putin to reward his allies and shower money on his pet projects and political priorities." When Gorkov arrived in 2012, VEB was struggling to stay afloat; it reportedly needed 1.3 trillion rubles (approximately $22.8 billion) by 2020 to avoid defaulting on its debt. In 2015, the bank received a $20 billion bailout following approval of Minister of Finance Anton Siluanov.

In July 2014, Vnesheconombank was slapped with sanctions by the European Union and the United States over the Russian invasion of Ukraine. The bank is also pursuing deals in the Persian Gulf and Islamic world. In 2016, Gorkov announced VEB would partner with the Islamic Development Bank in Saudi Arabia, a financing conglomerate of 56 Islamic countries, with an initial pilot project of $100 million.

=== Meeting with Jared Kushner ===
In 2017, Gorkov drew significant attention in Western media over his December 2016 meeting with Jared Kushner, son-in-law and top adviser to then president-elect Donald Trump. In March 2017, White House Press Secretary Sean Spicer stated that Kushner met with Gorkov briefly as part of his role in the transition and as a diplomatic conduit to the State Department. However, VEB issued a statement that said Gorkov met with Kushner on a private matter concerning his family's real estate corporation, Kushner Companies, even though VEB has been under international sanctions since July 2014. The statement, issued to Reuters, said that Gorkov met "with a number of representatives of the largest banks and business establishments of the United States, including Jared Kushner, the head of Kushner Companies." According to multiple reports, Kushner is looking for investors in his project at 666 Fifth Avenue, which Kushner Companies bought for a record $1.8 billion in January 2007 prior to the recession. VEB and White House officials have declined to specify the date of Gorkov's meeting with Kushner. According to The Washington Post, a VEB private jet associated with Gorkov's travel flew from Moscow to Newark, New Jersey on 13 December, and then departed 14 December to fly to Japan, where Putin was visiting for two days.

In January 2017, following the meeting with Kushner and after Gorkov had returned to Russia, Gorkov's VEB published the document "Strategy 2021" in which VEB planned to gain access to borrowing in the United States.

On 25 May 2017, it was reported that Kushner was being investigated for his meetings with Gorkov and Russian ambassador to the United States Sergey Kislyak, meetings which Kushner omitted on his form about foreign contacts when applying for security clearance. Gorkov's status as an FSB alumnus has led to media scrutiny of his past, especially as VEB acted as a cover for convicted Russian spy Yevgeny Buryakov, who was deported from the U.S. in March after serving 30 months in federal prison. CNN also noted that when Donald Trump brought the Miss Universe Pageant to Moscow in 2013, its biggest sponsor was Sberbank, led by Gorkov at the time.

=== Additional roles ===
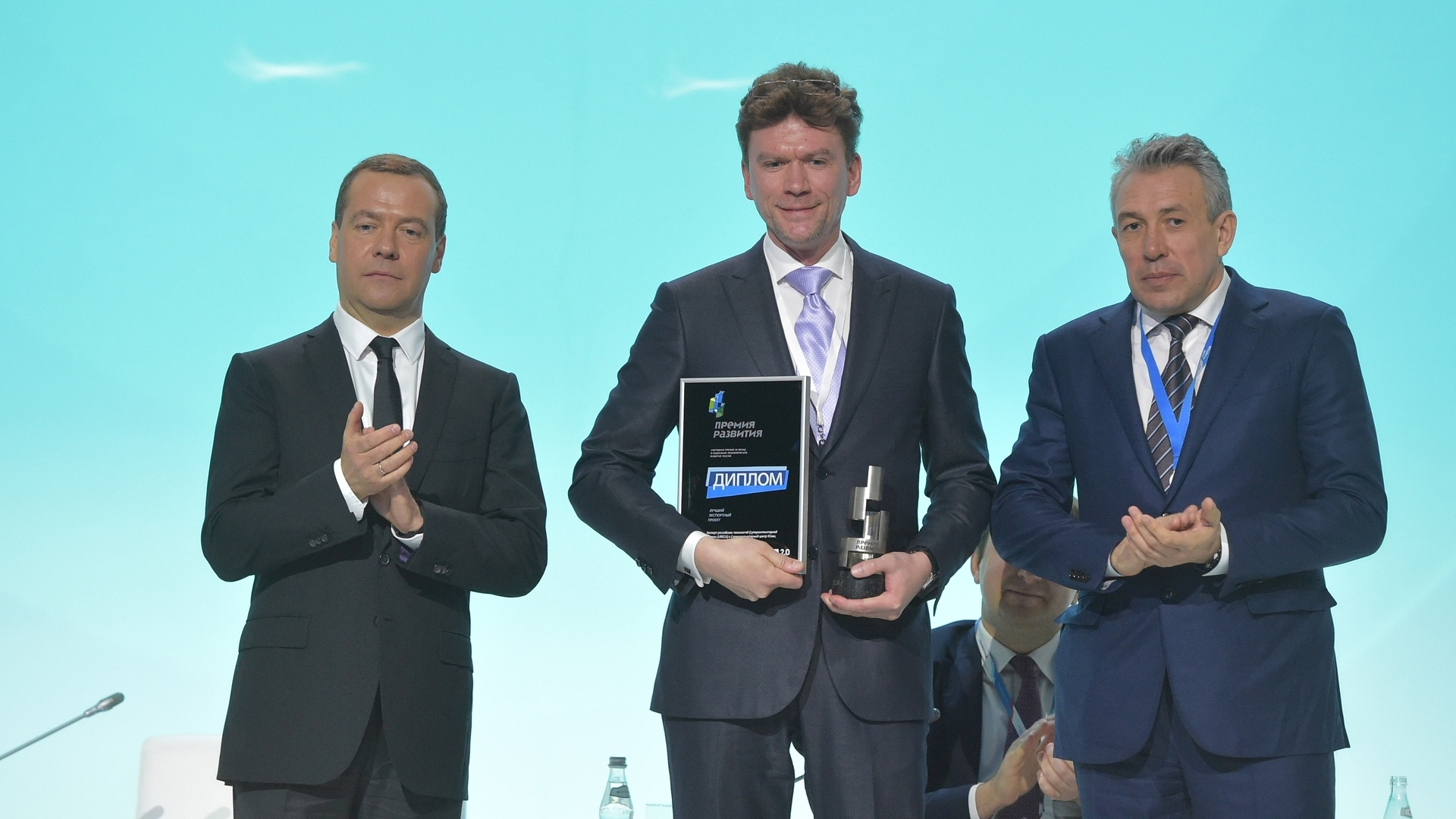
Gorkov with Russian Prime Minister Dmitry Medvedev, February 2017

Gorkov also sits on the board of directors for several companies, including Sberbank and Denizbank, the Russian aircraft industry's United Aircraft Corporation, and the Agency for Strategic Initiatives, a state-run project that encourages young Russians to turn their ideas into businesses.

== Personal life ==
Little is known about Gorkov's private life. Gorkov is married to Anna Nikolayevna Gorkova, with whom he has sons Alexei (born 1997) and Nikolai (born 2006), and a daughter, Polina (born 2002). He lists his hobbies as cartography and history.

Gorkov was awarded the Medal of the Order "For Merit to the Fatherland", II class, and the Certificate of Honor of Russia.

== See also ==
- Mueller Report
- Foreign electoral intervention
- Russian interference in the 2016 United States elections
- Russia–United States relations
