= Igor Shuvalov =

Russian politician (born 1967)

- Игорь Шувалов
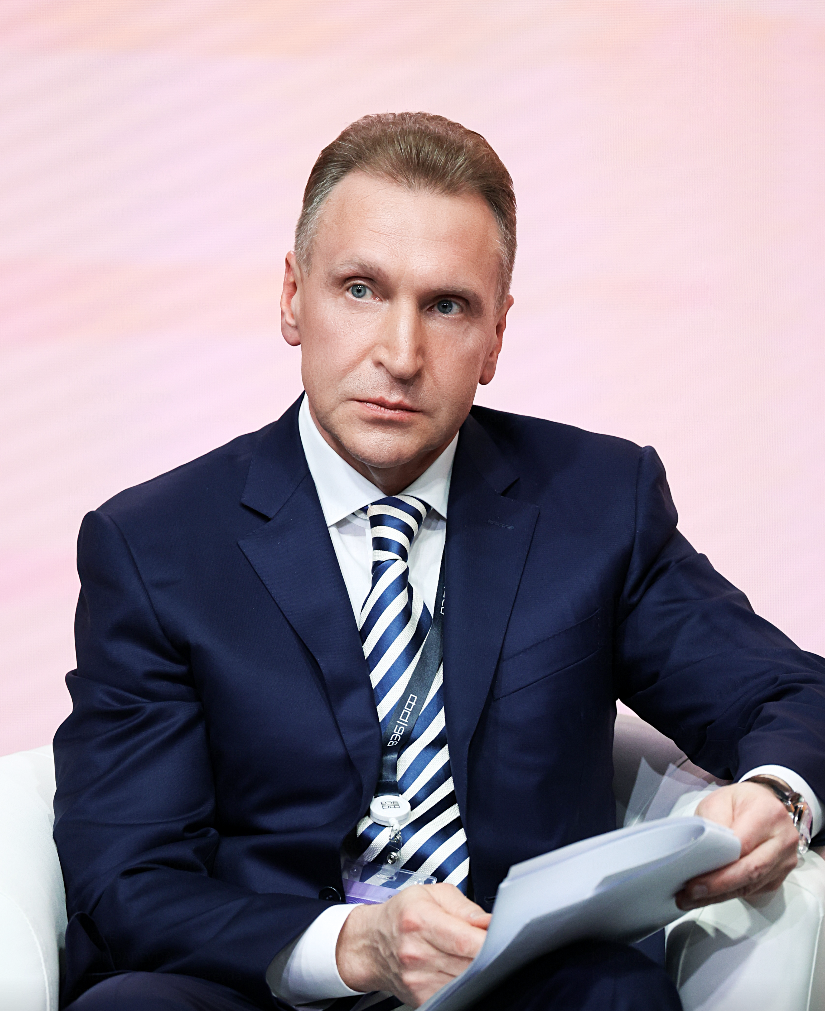
- Shuvalov in 2023

First Deputy Prime Minister of Russia
- In office 12 May 2008 – 18 May 2018 Serving with Viktor Zubkov until 21 May 2012
- Prime Minister: Vladimir Putin; Viktor Zubkov (acting); Dmitry Medvedev
- Preceded by: Dmitry Medvedev; Sergei Ivanov
- Succeeded by: Anton Siluanov

Personal details
- Born: 4 January 1967 (age 59) Bilibino, Russian SFSR, Soviet Union
- Party: Independent
- Education: Moscow State University (Faculty of Law)

Igor Ivanovich Shuvalov (Russian: И́горь Ива́нович Шува́лов, IPA: [ˈigərʲ ɪˈvanəvʲɪtɕ ʂʊˈvaləf]; born 4 January 1967) is the chair of the Russia's largest state development corporation VEB.RF (since May 24, 2018) and a former government official. He led VEB.RF through a modernization that significantly increased its role in the national economy and wellbeing.

Shuvalov was the First Deputy Prime Minister in Dmitry Medvedev's Cabinet and Vladimir Putin's Second Cabinet. He worked on socio-economic policies, state finances, investment climate, migration policy, development of the Far East, support for small and medium businesses, etc. He co-developed and supervised national development projects. In 2008 and 2014, he led the working group that developed the means to mitigate the after-effects of the Great Recession in Russia and the nationwide financial crisis respectively.

Shuvalov represented President of Russia in the G8 and worked on the preparation of the 2006 G8 Summit in Saint Petersburg, was the chair of the organizing committees of 2012 APEC Summit in Vladivostok, the 27th World Summer Universiade in Kazan 2013, and the 2018 FIFA World Cup.

Shuvalov is a Honored Economist of Russia and holds a doctor of science degree in Jurisprudence. In 2022, he defended a thesis on the Legal Regulation of Entrepreneurial Activity during Socio-Economic Crisis in the Institute of Legislation and Comparative Law.

== Biography ==
=== Early years ===
Igor Shuvalov was born on 4 January 1967 in Bilibino, Chukotka, USSR, in a family of Muscovites who traveled there to work in gold production. Later, Shuvalov returned to Moscow and finished his school education there in 1984. In 1984 and 1985, he worked as a lab assistant at the Scientific Research Institute of Economics and Communications Problems (НИИ «ЭКОС») before serving in the Soviet Army (1985 to 1987).

Discharged, Shuvalov spent a year on preparatory courses at the Moscow State University and was accepted to the MSU Faculty of Law. In 1993, he graduated as a top student with a degree in Jurisprudence. Later, in 2003, Shuvalov defended his candidate of science thesis on the role of the government in the legislative process. In 2022, he earned a doctor of science degree with a thesis on regulating business during socio-economic crises.

In the MSU, Shuvalov considered a diplomatic career and specialized in international public law. His MSU professor, Lev Shestakov, recommended Shuvalov for the service in the Ministry of Foreign Affairs' legal department as an attaché, where he was responsible for pursuing developments in international law.

=== Career ===
Following the birth of his first child, Shuvalov left public service for private business. In 1993, he was accepted as a senior legal advisor to the ALM legal bureau owned by Alexander Mamut (where ALM stood for his initials, A. L. Mamut). In two years, he was promoted to managing partner and was called to the bar.

In ALM, Shuvalov specialized in mediating shareholder conflicts and managed the cases of ALM's many high-net-worth clients, which made him dozens of thousands of dollars in paychecks. ALM provided services to many businesspeople and enterprises, including Oleg Boyko, Roman Abramovich's Sibneft (ALM outsourced the legal department functions for the company), ORT TV channel (the bureau managed the company that consolidated private investors' shares in the state-controlled TV channel). During that time, Shuvalov sometimes acted as a nominee to incorporate new legal entities for ALM's clients.

== State service ==
Shuvalov re-entered public service in 1997. Soon, he reached ministerial-level jobs and became a member of the President's staff in the early 2000s. In various roles, Shuvalov worked on economic policy decisions, was a point man on relations between the state and the big business and foreign investors, and designed tax reforms and support measures for small and medium businesses. In 2012, the U.S.-Russia Business Council named Shuvalov, back then the Deputy Prime Minister of Russia, an advocate for improving the business climate and strengthening the U.S.-Russia commercial relationship.

Shuvalov's portfolio as a state servant includes financial reforms, privatization, and the development of measures to get the country out of the Ruble Crisis, the Great Recession in Russia in 2008, and the financial crisis of 2014. He represented the country at the World Economic Forum and G8 summits, communicated with the country's partners in the Eurasian economic associations, and led Russia's campaign for admission to the World Trade Organization. He was behind Russia's successful bid to host the 2018 FIFA World Cup and headed the 2013 Summer Universiade and World Cup organizing committee.

Shuvalov is considered a liberal within the Russian political elite with enough influence to oppose and counterweight the strongest siloviki hardliners in the Russian top circles, such as Igor Sechin.

=== Various roles, from 1997 to 2003 ===
According to Forbes, Oleg Boyko, one of the ALM clients, convinced Shuvalov to return to state service as an opportunity to impact the future of Russia. Boyko introduced Shuvalov to Alfred Koch, the head of the Federal Agency for State Property Management. Half a year later, Shuvalov joined the Agency as the head of the department responsible for the new State Register of Federal Property of the State Committee for State Property Management and managed the sales of the federal property.

In January 1998, the Agency was reorganized into the Ministry of State Property of Russian Federation. Shuvalov was promoted to the deputy minister responsible for three departments: science, culture, and the service industry. In May, he was appointed to manage the Russian Federal Property Foundation as a deputy chair (a chairperson since September 1998) and worked on the RFPF's cooperation with the business community.

In August 1998, following the Ruble Crisis, Shuvalov was appointed to the working group to develop the measures to save the country from the crisis. Since December 1998, Shuvalov has curated the creation of the Agency for Restructuring of Credit Organizations (ARCO). In the late 1990s, he was the state representative on the boards of Rosgosstrakh, Sovcomflot, ORT, All-Russian Exhibition Center, and Gazprom.

From May 2000 to May 2003, Shuvalov served as the Minister of the Cabinet Office (the Chief of staff of the Government of Russia). He coordinated the government's legislative work, managed the Committee of Standardization, Metrology, and Certification, the state Institute of Legislation and Comparative Law, the Russian Presidential Academy of National Economy and Public Administration, and the Financial University under the Government of the Russian Federation. Shuvalov initiated a reform of the institution, introduced qualification tests and strict standards for the staff, switched to electronic document management, and centralized the legislative activities of the Government and its cooperation with the Parliament.

=== In the Presidential Administration, 2003 to 2008 ===
In May 2003, Shuvalov became one of the Aides to president in the Presidential Administration of Russia. In that role, he coordinated the working group that developed the roadmaps to reach the key goals outlined by Vladimir Putin: increase of gross domestic product, poverty reduction, etc. Shuvalov essentially worked on the fundamentals of Putin's presidential election campaign.

Shuvalov was the deputy head of the Presidential Administration from October 2003 to March 2004 and was reappointed as the President's Aide. In the following years, he curated the expert teams that prepared the long-term economic analysis for the president, was the deputy head of the Presidential Commission for Improving Public Administration and Justice and the Presidential Council on the Implementation of the National Priority Projects, and represented the president at the National Banking Council of Russia. He also was Putin's representative at G8 and the deputy head of the organizing committee to prepare Russia's chairmanship in G8.

=== The First Deputy Prime Minister, 2008 to 2018 ===
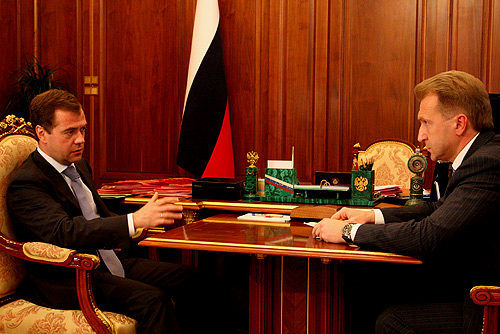
Shuvalov (right) with President Medvedev, 2008

When Dmitry Medvedev became the President of Russia, on 12 May 2008, Shuvalov moved to the Government as the First Deputy Prime Minister of Russia and remained in that position from May 2008 to May 2018. For some time, following Alexei Kudrin's resignation as the Minister of Finance, he was de facto responsible for the government's economic bloc as a whole.

Shuvalov worked on the socio-economic development programs, monetary policy, fiscal policy, credit policy, government debt management, federal asset management, public investment policy, federal targeted programs, foreign trade and economic cooperation, migration policy, technical regulations, state property management, tariff policy, regional development, anti-monopoly and pro-competition policy, support to small and medium enterprises (SMB), housing development and affordability, road traffic safety, optimization of the government spending, and the development of monotowns.

Following the outbreak of the Great Recession in Russia in 2008 and the Russian financial crisis of 2014, Shuvalov headed the working groups tasked to reduce the after-effects of the crises. For instance, in December 2014, the timely action helped stabilize the Ruble in just days after its collapse.

Shuvalov represented Russia in international bodies as the chairperson of the Customs Union of the Eurasian Economic Union (2007 to 2012), the national coordinator on the Commonwealth of Independent States (2009 to 2018), the national representative on the board of the Eurasian Economic Commission. He led Russia's delegation at the negotiations on the creation of the Eurasian Economic Union and the negotiation with the World Trade Organization.

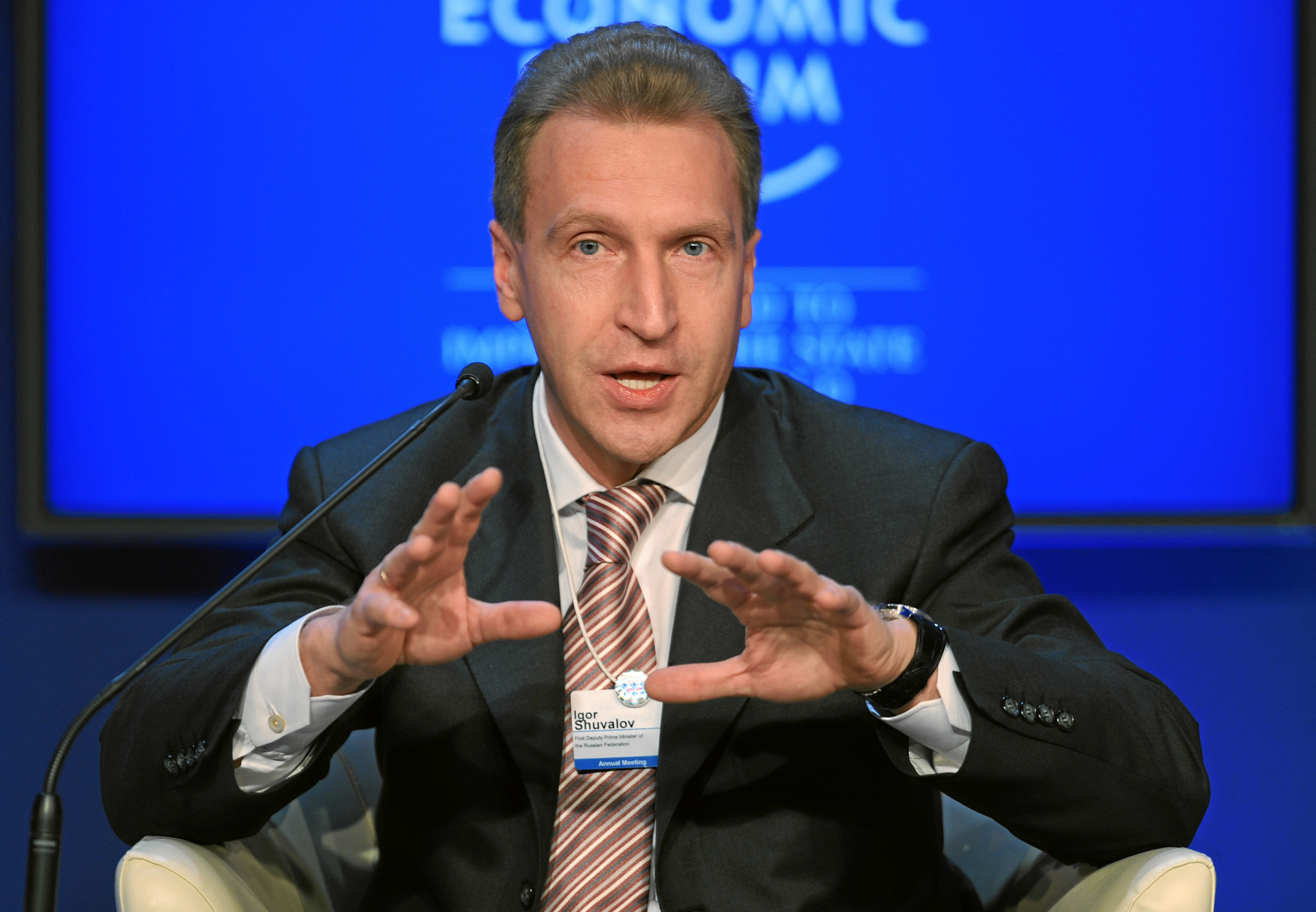
Shuvalov during the WEF 2011

Shuvalov participated in the creation and execution of the National Entrepreneurial Initiative that improved conditions for small and medium businesses through tax relief, public procurement quotas, and specialized support programs. In just 7 years, from 2011 to 2018, Russia demonstrated remarkable growth in the World Bank's ease of doing business index from position 123 to 31. Shuvalov was also responsible for streamlining communication between the Russian authorities and local and international investors.

He was the head of the expert council of the Agency for Strategic Initiatives, the chair of the Skolkovo Foundation, and the chair of the state-owned Prosveshcheniye publishing house. He also was the deputy secretary of the United Russia's Presidium and headed the party's list in Primorsky Krai at the 2011 Russian legislative election. He's a member of the All-Russia People's Front.

=== The Chairman of VEB, 2018 to present ===
In May 2018, Shuvalov was appointed as the head of Vnesheconombank (VEB) state development corporation (soon renamed to VEB.RF) with a task to reform it and to fulfill Vladimir Putin's so-called May Decrees, the long-term development goals.

In 2018, Shuvalov arranged the recapitalization of VEB, the sale of loss-making and non-core assets, cut the half of the VEB staff, and reduced the salaries of its executives. VEB was reorganized into a centralized investment bloc with novel approach to project financing. It also introduced a new focus on city development and infrastructure projects. A reorganized VEB positioned itself as the methodology center for sustainable development in Russia.

Under the new strategy, VEB integrated Rosnano, the Skolkovo Foundation, the Industrial Development Fund, the Fund for Infrastructure and Educational Programs, the Russian Information Technology Development Fund, the SME Corporation, the Russian Export Center, the Russian Agency for Export Credit and Investment Insurance, the Industrial Development Fund, and The Foundation for Assistance to Small Innovative Enterprises, as well as the functions of specialized development agencies (focused on the Far East or the Arctic). This change aimed to remove the overlapping of functions and focus of state development institutions.

On 5 June 2025, by decree of the President of the Russian Federation, Igor Shuvalov was appointed Chairman of a special working group of the Presidential Council for Strategic Development and National Projects. The special working group was established by an order of the President of the Russian Federation.

On 24 July 2021, President Vladimir Putin extended Shuvalov's term as Chairman of VEB.RF for another five years by presidentail decree.

On 26 June 2024, President Putin again renewed Shuvalov's appointment for an additional five-year term.

Beginning in 2024, Shuvalov partnered with the Russian National Museum of Music in supporting the reconstruction of the Antonina Nezhdanova Vocal Studio, a historical cultural project.

On 15 May 2025, he was appointed by presidential decree to the Board of Trustees of the Russian Academy of Sciences.

On 4 June 2025, Shuvalov was elected Chairman of the Board of Trustees of the Moscow State Academy of Choreography.

In April 2026, Shuvalov became Chairman of the Board of Trustees of the Skolkovo Institute of Science and Technology (Skoltech).

== Professional activities ==
=== National projects ===
Shuvalov is considered the author of the concept of so-called National Priority Projects, Vladimir Putin's development plans introduced in 2005 with an aim to improve public health, education, housing, and agriculture. Shuvalov was involved in the development and control of the implementation of said programs.

=== Privatization ===
Shuvalov was one of the key proponents of privatization as a means to stabilize the treasure and improve the management of public property to overcome the effects of the Great Recession in Russia. In 2009, Putin assigned Shuvalov and his office to develop privatization plans. However, the initiative faced opposition from the state capitalists and lobbyists of state-owned energy, transport, infrastructure, oil, and gas companies and influential members of the Russian elites, such as Igor Sechin and Sergei Shmatko. Dmitry Medvedev supported the privatization, but Putin changed his mind by the time he returned to the president's seat. In 2013, he ultimately canceled the big privatization plans. Despite that, the Vedomosti interviewee in the government praised Shuvalov for a successful "small privatization" of unitary enterprises in the regions of Russia.

=== Development of the Far East ===
In 2008, Shuvalov was appointed the head of the organizing committee on the preparation of the Asia-Pacific Economic Cooperation (APEC) Summit in Vladivostok in 2012 and the head of the commission on the development of the Far East, the Republic of Buryatia, Zabaykalsky Krai, and Irkutsk Oblast. He advocated for a targeted approach focused on certain clusters that could attract private investors and generate economic growth.

Vladivostok underwent a significant transformation as a 2012 APEC Summit venue. Shuvalov supervised several large-scale projects, including the Russky Bridge, Zolotoy Bridge, and the new Far Eastern Federal University campus on Russky Island were complete. The summit heralded the beginning of Russia's more attentive policy toward the development of the Far East and the success of Shuvalov's vision.

=== Financial Mega-Regulator ===
In 2012, Shuvalov proposed to transfer the functions of the Federal Financial Markets Service to the Central Bank of Russia and create a mega-regulator to supervise all financial markets in Russia. This plan was approved by the President of Russia in January 2013 and subsequently implemented.

=== Universiade 2013 ===
In 2009, Shuvalov was appointed the head of the organizing committee for the 2013 Summer Universiade. He supervised the completion of many facilities, created or reconstructed for the event. Said objects included the new terminal of the Kazan International Airport and the reconstructed old terminal, the Aeroexpress line, the central rail terminal, a new Kazan Metro line, numerous transport infrastructure objects, and temporary structures to meet the needs of athletes and other visitors of Kazan.

Shuvalov was awarded the Order for Service to the Republic of Tatarstan and the Honorary Citizen of Kazan status for economic development and prosperity, enhancing the city's reputation and strengthening the image of the capital of Tatarstan in Russia and the world.

=== FIFA World Cup 2018 ===
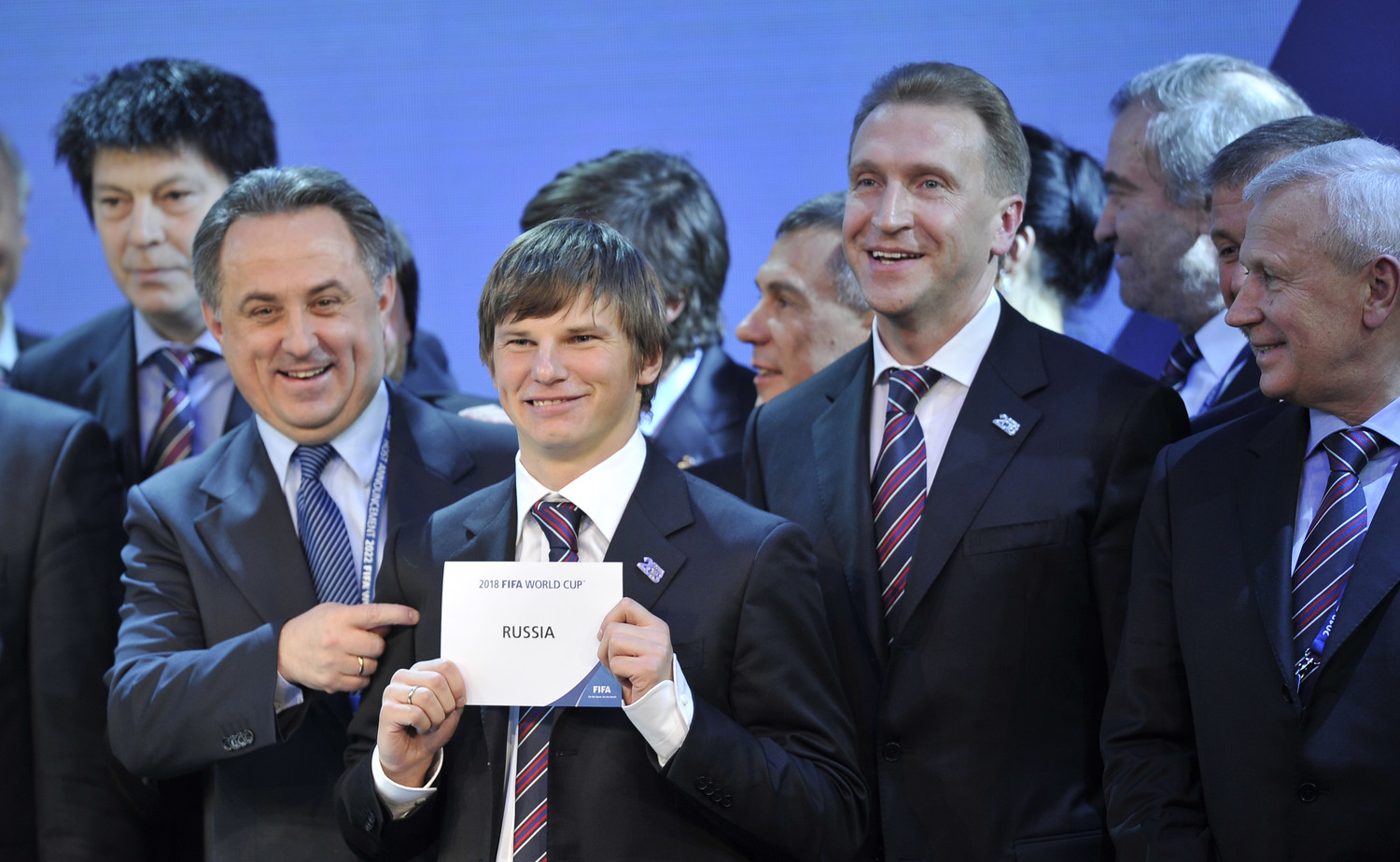
Shuvalov (fourth from left) celebrates winning the World Cup bid with Andrei Arshavin (center) and others.

In 2013, Shuvakov was appointed the head of the committee in support of Russia's nomination to host the 2018 FIFA World Cup. He was the head of the Russian delegation that presented the country's successful bid in Zurich. In the following years, he also curated the organization and preparation of the tournament, which was later widely considered a massive soft power success for Russia.

== Controversies ==
=== Investments ===
As a part of non-monetary compensation, Shuvalov received call options in the companies of his long-term clients, such as Boyko and Abramovich. Said options (along with other investments) had subsequently earned him up to US$80 million. The funds were transferred to a family trust firm (a group of offshore companies beneficially owned by his wife, Olga). An official cited by The Moscow Times pointed out that, in 1997, when Shuvalov re-entered state service, he pioneered opening up the structure of the state servants' business assets.

In the 2000s, Shuvalov's trust made several profitable investments. In 2003, when President Vladimir Putin announced the liberalization of Gazprom shares trade, Shuvalov co-invested with Suleiman Kerimov. By 2007, Gazprom shares had grown seven times in value, and Shuvalovs claimed earnings of up to US$100 million. In 2004, Shuvalovs lent US$50 million to Alisher Usmanov to fund the purchase of Corus Group, which was close to bankruptcy (therefore, banks declined to credit the purchase). Under the agreement, in several years, Usmanov returned the initial loan and a share in the returns on the investment—a total of US$119 million.

Many years later, Shuvalov's MSU classmate, AML co-worker, and ex-financial manager of Shuvalovs' trust companies, Pavel Ivlev (by that time, the head of the non-profit funded by an exiled oligarch Mikhail Khodorkovsky) leaked the documents related to Shuvalovs' investments. Said papers were scrutinized by the Barron's, Financial Times, and The Wall Street Journal. However, the journalists found no indications that the transactions violated Russian laws. Russian prosecutors found no wrongdoings either. At the same time, Henri Reznik, the head of the Moscow City Bar Association, emphasized that Ivlev harshly violated the attorney-client privilege, while the ALM representative accused the ex-employee of manipulating the documents to cause harm out of political motives.

Commenting on the case, Shuvalov pointed out that the investments were above the board, the earnings were reported, and the taxes paid. The former Chief of Staff of the President's Office, Aleksandr Voloshin, and the former Minister of Economic Development, German Gref, also spoke in defense of Shuvalov. For instance, Gref, who was an official responsible for the liberalization of the Gazprom stock trade, noted that Shuvalov was not an insider.

== Sanctions ==
Shuvalov is sanctioned by the US, EU, Australia, Canada, Japan, New Zealand, Switzerland, and Ukraine in relation to the 2022 Russian invasion of Ukraine.

== Personal life ==
=== Family ===
Igor Shuvalov is married to Olga Shuvalova (born 27 March 1966). Olga is also a 1993 MSU Faculty of Law alumni, a former civil lawyer, and Shuvalov's ex-coworker in ALM. She quit her legal career after the birth of their 4th child.

Shuvalovs have four children. Eugene (born 1993) is a Moscow School of Economics and Wellington College alumni. From 2011 to 2012, he served in the Pacific Fleet Special Forces based on Russky Island. Maria (born 1998) is a ballet dancer in the Bolshoy Theatre. Anastasia (born 2002) studied at the Moscow State University Faculty of Psychology. Shuvalov's youngest son was born in 2010.

=== Wealth ===
In 2014, the media estimated the Shuvalovs' fortune to be around US$220 million. Back in 1997, Shuvalov entered state service following a successful career in consulting. Shuvalov transferred his assets to a family trust, which his spouse beneficially owned. Since 2012, Shuvalov's fortune has been managed by a blind trust. Since 2013, the assets have been transferred to the Russian jurisdiction (as required by Russian law).

Shuvalov became the first public official in Russia to disclose the family fortune in 2008. However, his spouse usually reported a higher income as the beneficial owner of family assets. The younger Shuvalovs beneficially own some of the family property. By 2021, the Russian Forbes ranked Shuvalov #82 among other public servants with the highest income.

Russian and international media sometimes covered Shuvalov's wealth and extravagant spending. For instance, The Times cited reports that Shuvalov's spouse used a private jet to transport their Welsh Corgis to dog shows across Europe. Shuvalovs own luxurious apartments in London, and Moscow, a villa on Dubai's Palm Jumeirah, and an estate in Zarechye, Moscow Oblast.

== Awards and honors ==
- Honorary Diploma of the Government of the Russian Federation (2003) for the significant personal contribution to meeting the challenges of the socio-economic development of Russia
- Russian Federation Presidential Certificate of Gratitude (2004)
- Order of Honour (2008)
- Order of Alexander Nevsky (2013) for significant contribution to the State and many years of productive public service.
- Order For Merit to the Republic of Tatarstan (2013)
- Order "For Merit to the Fatherland" of II (2014), III (2006), and IV (2012) classes.
- Order of the Friendship of Peoples (Belarus, 2015) for the contributions to the development of the Eurasian Economic Union.
- Stolypin Medal (2017) for significant merit to the social-economic development.

Shuvalov holds a rank of a 1st class Active State Councillor of the Russian Federation, and he is an Honorary Citizen of Kazan (2013) and Vladivostok (2014). Shuvalov is an Honorary Doctor of Kazan Federal University (2025). In 2026 Igor Shuvalov received the breastplate of the Ministry of Culture of the Russian Federation "For Contribution to Russian Culture".

Political offices
Preceded by Dmitry Medvedev	First Deputy Prime Minister of Russia; 2008 – 2018	Succeeded by Anton Siluanov
