= FSKA =

FSKA may refer to:

- Federal Service for Alcohol and Tobacco Markets Control, a Russian federal agency
- Funakoshi Shotokan Karate Association, an international karate association
