= Maxim Voznesensky =

Russian artist jeweller (born 1965)

Maxim Voznesenskiy
- Максим Леонидович Вознесенский
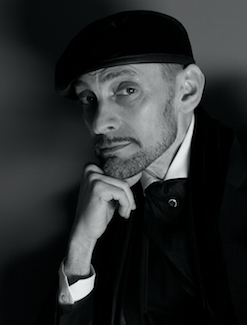
- Born: Maxim Leonidovich Voznesesnky; 1965 (age 60–61); Alol, Pskov Oblast, Russia
- Citizenship: Russia Armenia
- Education: Moscow Institute of Architecture, Moscow State Pedagogical University
- Known for: Art jewellery
- Website: maxim-voznesensky.com maximv.com

Maxim Leonidovich Voznesensky (Russian: Максим Леонидович Вознесенский) is an artist jeweller, art collector, creator of art projects, and promoter of Russian art.

== Early life ==
Maxim Leonidovich Voznesensky was born in 1965 in the village Alol, Pskov Oblast, into an artistic family and his interest in jewellery design stemmed from a young age. His mother, Svetlana Popova, was a painter and overcoming the difficulties of being deaf, she made her way in the world of art. His father, Leonid Voznesensky, is a biologist and a doctor.

Voznesensky graduated in design at the Moscow Arts and Crafts School in 1983, specialising in jewellery. Between 1983 and 1985 he completed his Military Service in the Soviet Army. He then studied at the Moscow Institute of Architecture for three years. In 1991 he graduated from the Faculty of Graphic Arts at the Moscow State Pedagogical University.

== Career ==
In 1992 Voznesensky became a member of the Artists Union of the USSR in Moscow. In 1998 Maxim Voznesensky, together with his wife Irina Dorofeyeva, founded House of Jewellery "Jewellery Theatre". After her death Voznesensky went on to open a private boutique "Jewellery Theatre" as its owner and creative director, in Moscow on Kutuzovsky Prospect, and later in 2010 on Kuznetsky Most. Speaking to the New York Times, Voznesensky explained:

We are doing all we can to revive the traditions of Russian jewelry art and return it to the level it was at before the revolution... Today, Jewellery Theatre is less a commercial enterprise than it is a cultural and educational organization.

He then moved to London to open the Maxim Voznesensky boutique on Old Bond Street together with his financial partner. Late in 2013 Maxim left the partnership and the boutique was renamed "Jewellery Theatre".

== Collections ==
Voznesensky has designed over twenty individual collections of jewellery, and today his jewellery is represented in museums including the Kremlin Armoury, the Ekaterinburg Museum of Fine Arts, and in private collections in many parts of the world including Russia, Germany, Holland, Israel, France, Spain, Italy, Canada and the USA.

== Exhibitions ==
During his career Voznesensky has curated exhibitions in Russia and in other countries. In 2001 he put together the exhibition ‘Diamonds of Russia – 20th Century’ in the Ivan the Great Bell Tower of the Moscow Kremlin Museum, together with the Alrosa Company and Gokhran - the State Fund of Precious Metals and Precious Stones of the Russian Federation. Featured in the exhibition was the collection: ‘The Diamond in The Russian Avant-garde’, which also included many other artist jewellers from Russia. In 2013, the entire collection, including eight pieces by Voznesensky of Jewellery Theatre, was gifted by the Alrosa Company to Kremlin Armoury Museum where it is now on permanent display.

In 2002 Voznesensky had a joint exhibition with American jewellery designer Lisa Vershbow at the All-Russia Museum of Decorative, Applied & Folk Art. Each year between 2003 and 2010 Voznesensky exhibited his jewellery collections under the brand "Jewellery Theatre", at BaselWorld - The World Watch and Jewellery Show.

In 2008 he created the Art Project "The Representation of Beauty" to mark the 10th anniversary of the founding of "Jewellery Theatre" with a limited edition publication of the same name. The project consisted of a theatrical presentation of a series of photographs of women wearing his jewellery by the photographer Vladimir Klavijo-Telepnev and curated by the art critic Patimat Gamzatova.

== Notable works ==
White Triangle and Black Triangle, 2001. Kremlin Armoury.

=== The Moscow Kremlin Museum ===
In 2001 Voznesensky produced the White Triangle and the Black Triangle, which is now a permanent exhibit in the Kremlin Armoury.

Pearl egg pendant for Queen Letizia of Spain, 2004.

=== Royal Connections ===
Interested in the work of Faberge, he created his first "egg" pendant over twenty years ago, and in 2004 Voznesensky, as creative director of "Jewellery Theatre", designed the Wedding gift for King Felipe VI of Spain and Queen Letizia, in the shape of a black and white pearl egg symbolising the union of marriage also inspired by the work of Faberge.

On the occasion of the Queen's Medal Concert at the Barbican (London) in 2012 Voznesensky designed a box, as if it were a theatrical stage with lighting which changes creating different times of day and seasons of the year. On the stage, looking at each other, stand a horse and a corgi dog made of silver with diamonds incrusted in the hoofs and paws, which was gifted by the London Symphony Orchestra to Queen Elizabeth II.

Miss Russia Crown, 2010

Maxim Voznesensky. Queen Elizabeth II receives the Magic Box «Idyll», a gift of the London Symphony Orchestra. Barbican.

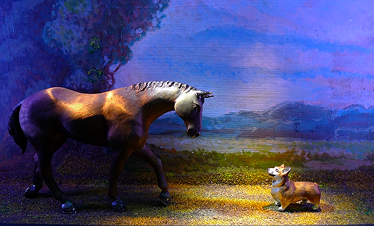
Magic Box «Idyll», 2012

=== Miss Russia Crown ===
In 2010 at the request of the organising committee of the Miss Russia contest, Maxim Voznesensky designed and made a crown for the winners.

The crown, made of white gold, pearls and diamonds has become an exclusive piece of jewellery, symbolic of the historic ties between Byzantine art and ancient Russia.

At the awards ceremony Voznesensky presented the crown to the winner of the contest.

== Awards ==
In 1999 Voznesensky was awarded the "Diploma for Constructive Design" at the "Jeweller -99 International Exhibition" in Moscow for invention of the "heel", which allows the ring to stand upright. In 2002 he was awarded the "People of the Year Award" and in the same year his designs for "Jewellery Theatre" won the prize "Tahitian Pearl Trophy" at the International Jewellery Competition. In 2004 he won First prize "Golden Style" nomination at the "International Jewellery Moscow Exhibition" and prize for the Best Stand.
