= VEB.RF =

Russian investment corporation

Coordinates: 55°46′19.03″N 37°38′41.27″E

- Native name: ВЭБ.РФ
- Formerly: Vnesheconombank, VEB
- Type: Development corporation
- Industry: Investment
- Founded: 1922 (as bank), 2007 (as development institute)
- Headquarters: Moscow, Russia
- Key people: Igor Shuvalov (chairman)
- Brands: VEB.RF, VEB
- Net income: ₽8.4 bn (2020)
- Total assets: ₽3,406 bn (2020)
- Total equity: ₽689 bn (2020)
- Website: veb.ru/en

VEB.RF, or simply VEB (Russian: ВЭБ.РФ), is a Russian state development corporation and investment company. It was the Russian successor entity of the Foreign Trade Bank of the USSR, renamed Vnesheconombank (VEB) in 1988 and dismantled in 1991. VEB was reorganized in 2007 as a development institute and rebranded as VEB.RF in 2018. It has financed more than 300 projects. VEB.RF operates under the federal law "On the State Development Corporation VEB.RF". VEB.RF plays a leading role in Russia’s system of development institutions, sometimes referred to as the Development Group. The group includes the Skolkovo Foundation, the Russian Export Center, the SME Corporation, the Industrial Development Fund, the Foundation for Assistance to Innovation, and other development institutions. VEB.RF also serves as a methodological center for ESG and green finance. At the instruction of the President of Russia, VEB.RF became a mandatory participant in major public-private partnership projects with investment volumes of RUB 3 billion or more. Under this arrangement, new projects and initiatives above that threshold are subject to VEB.RF review. The project assessment methodology was developed by the Ministry of Economic Development with input from regional authorities, VEB.RF and participants in the PPP market. The methodology incorporates the Quality of Life Index in Russian Cities. In 2025, the President of Russia instructed VEB.RF to develop a national standard for public-private cooperation and to define a financing model for such projects. In 2026, Rosstandart approved the national standard developed by VEB.RF, GOST R 72783–2026 “Public-Private Cooperation. General Provisions”. The standard has entered into force on 1 September 2026.

== History ==
=== Initial legacy of the Soviet Vnesheconombank ===
In 1988, the Foreign Trade Bank of the USSR was renamed Vnesheconombank of the USSR ("Bank for Foreign Economic Affairs of the USSR"). With the dissolution of the Soviet Union in 1991, the operations of the Soviet Vnesheconombank (VEB) outside of the RSFSR were nationalized by the respective post-Soviet States. On 17 December 1991, VEB accounts in Russia were frozen because of lack of funds. Approximately, for the next seven years, the Kremlin's obshchak («общак») or black cash was stored in the vaults of VEB. According to former head of Central Bank of Russia Viktor Gerashchenko, the 1992 decree by the Supreme Soviet established VEB as a "kind of agency for the repayment of the national debt of the USSR": "Vnesheconombank does not have a central banking license. It does not need it, since it does not conduct any commercial operations." He also added: "Due to the lack of a license, this is the only Russian bank that the Central Bank does not check – it does not have the right."

In 2002, Vnesheconombank was restructured, reduced the scope of its commercial business, and prioritized support for the government's structural reforms. In April 2002, VEB was appointed Vnesheconombank as an investment agent into Pension Fund of the Russian Federation denominated in foreign currency, and in January 2003, VEB formed a special subdivision to handle pension funds. From 2005 to 2006, the bank's assets were doubled from around $6 billion to $12 billion, at the same time liabilities rose from $5 billion to $11 billion. The income rose from $239 million to $301 million.

=== Bank of Development (2007–2018) ===
In April 2007, Russian State Duma passed federal law "On Bank for Development", which regulated VEB's legal conditions and made it a state development bank. Vladimir Putin increased lending when he became the VEB's chairman of its supervisory board in 2008. (Note: By law in 2008, the Russian Prime Minister is VEB's chairman of its supervisory board.) By late 2009, VEB quadrupled its assets to nearly 2 trillion rubles ($65 billion), it was seen by the government as an off-budget fund, used to put off budget expenses.

In July 2014, the United States Department of the Treasury imposed economic sanctions that greatly restricted U.S. persons and entities from dealing with VEB after the 2014 pro-Russian unrest in Ukraine. Between 2014 and 2017, the Russian Ministry of Finance invested $10 billion into the bank. VEB has suffered massive losses in 2014–2015, leading to a 330 billion rubles government bailout in 2015, followed by a 150 billion rubles bailout in 2016 with a similar amount planned for 2017. VEB was the main lender for the 2014 Winter Olympics. However, many of the returns on investment missed original forecasts, and VEB had to be restructured to rehabilitate its finnances.

In March 2016, the bank was promised a $2.2 billion bailout from the Russian government. Sergey Gorkov, a former senior executive at Sberbank, was appointed to head VEB and come up with a turnaround strategy, one of which included the sale of non-core assets. The government originally offered the position to German Gref, who turned down the job.

In March 2017, Ukraine imposed sanctions on Vnesheconombank (and other Russian state-owned banks operating in Ukraine: Sberbank, VTB Bank, VS Bank, Prominvestbank, and BM Bank) as part of its sanctions on Russia for its annexation of Crimea and involvement in the Donbas war. Subsequently, the bank tried to sell its Ukrainian subsidiary, Prominvestbank; as of August 2017 unsuccessfully. In February 2018, Gorkov said he hoped to sell Prominvestbank by May 2018. In 2017, the bank's debt reached $17 billion, including $14.2 billion in Ukraine. In January 2017, Gorkov released the bank's "Strategy 2021", which predicted relief from sanctions, resuming borrowing in the United States, and shifting risks to the government's budget. According to a report the New York Times published in May 2017, 40% of the bank's loans were at risk of default.

=== State Development Corporation (from 2018) ===
In May 2018 Igor Shuvalov replaced Gorkov as VEB's new chairman. The following July, the bank requested a further $16 billion bailout from the Russian government. In October 2018 it announced plans to rebrand, changing its denomination into 'National Development Institute', and confirming it would be granted 600 billion rubles ($9.1 billion) in subsidies from the federal budget by 2024, in addition to the 125 billion rubles received in 2018.

The net profit for the 2018 amounted to 3.85 billion rubles after a loss to 200.4 billion rubles a year earlier. The net profit for the first quarter of 2019 17.6 billion rubles.

In 2019, after a long period when VEB.RF, instead of financing new projects, was engaged in servicing distressed assets, new investment projects appeared in the portfolio of the state corporation. In the framework of VEB.RF went into the development of the Udokan's copper deposit ($490 million), the production of sulfuric acid at the "KuibyshevAzot" and capacity expansion of "Shchekinoazot" for the production of methanol (the total participation of the corporation 8.5 billion.). VEB.RF started financing the project of construction of six large-tonnage vessels at the Zvezda super-shipyard near Vladivostok. Also VEB.RF, Gazprombank and Sberbank announced the funding of the development of the Talitsky area of the Verkhnekamsk potash deposit in Perm. VEB.RF and Sberbank will provide a syndicated loan for the modernization of Novaport group's regional airports in six cities of Russia, and together with Rockwell Capital will build the largest pulp and paper mill in Siberia.

As of 31 December 2025, the assets of the VEB.RF Group amounted to RUB 7.5086 trillion. The Group's capital increased by 11.3% in 2025, or RUB 110.4 billion, reaching RUB 1.0881 trillion at year-end. VEB.RF's net profit under International Financial Reporting Standards (IFRS) amounted to RUB 89.4 billion in 2025, an increase of 17.9%, or RUB 13.6 billion, compared with 2024.

Under its 2021-2024 strategy, the total value of projects and transactions supported by the VEB.RF Group amounted to RUB 24.4 trillion, against a target of RUB 17 trillion, including RUB 8.6 trillion in direct support. By 2030, the Group plans to support projects worth more than RUB 30 trillion, including RUB 15 trillion in projects involving VEB.RF financing.

== Sanctions ==
VEB.RF was sanctioned by the United Kingdom from 1 August 2014 in relation to Russia's activities in Crimea, and was sanctioned by New Zealand in relation to the 2022 Russian invasion of Ukraine.

In February 2022, due to Russia's invasion of Ukraine, together with its subsidiaries, it was included in the US sanctions list, SDN, which provides for the maximum possible restrictions and a complete freeze of assets. The bank was also disconnected from the SWIFT interbank payment system, and included in the sanctions list of Singapore.

== Organisation ==
Since May 2018, the chair of VEB.RF has been Igor Shuvalov . The highest governing body of VEB.RF is the Supervisory Board, itself chaired by the Russian Prime Minister.

VEB.RF coordinates development institution in Russia, and is a Russian state corporation with the goal of supporting and developing the Russian economy. According to a filing pursuant to the Foreign Agents Registration Act, it is not owned, nor directed, by the government or any political party.

Previous chairs of Vnesheconombank include Tomas Alibegov, who was First Deputy Chairman and acting Chairman 1989–1997, Andrey Kostin (1996–2002), Vladimir Dmitriev (2004–2016), and Sergei Gorkov (2016–2018).

== See also ==
- EXIAR
- List of national development banks
