= National Priority Projects =

Russian government program

Logo of the National Priority Projects

The National Priority Projects of Russia (Russian: Приоритетные национальные проекты России) was a program of the Russian government set out by Russian president Vladimir Putin in his speech on 5 September 2005.

The program was aimed to develop social welfare in Russia by additional funding by the state of four selected projects focusing on public health, education, housing and agriculture. The program has been supervised by the Council for Implementation of the Priority National Projects attached to the president of the Russian Federation, created according to a presidential decree on 21 October 2005. The council has been headed by the president himself, First Deputy Prime Minister Dmitry Medvedev has been appointed First Deputy Chairman of the Council and Chairman of its Presidium, Deputy Prime Minister Alexander Zhukov and Igor Shuvalov, aide to the president, have become deputy chairmen of the council.

The most high-profile change within the national priority project frameworks has probably been the 2006 across-the-board increase in wages in healthcare and education, as well as the decision to modernise equipment in both sectors in 2006 and 2007.

The website of the Council for Implementation of the Priority National Projects and Demographic Policy previously contained an archive of documents on the implementation of national projects. The site was no longer updated from May 2009. In July 2008, Russian president Dmitry Medvedev recognized the composition of the Council outdated, and in September 2010, the statute on it was declared invalid as well.

On 7 May 2018, after the start of his fourth term as president, Vladimir Putin signed a decree to set up the new National Projects of Russia (Russian: Национальные проекты России) developed in three areas: "Human Capital", "Comfortable Environment for Life" and "Economic Growth."

== See also ==
- Agriculture in Russia
