= Vladimir Dmitriev =

Russian businessman

Vladimir Alexandrovich Dmitriev
- Владимир Александрович Дмитриев
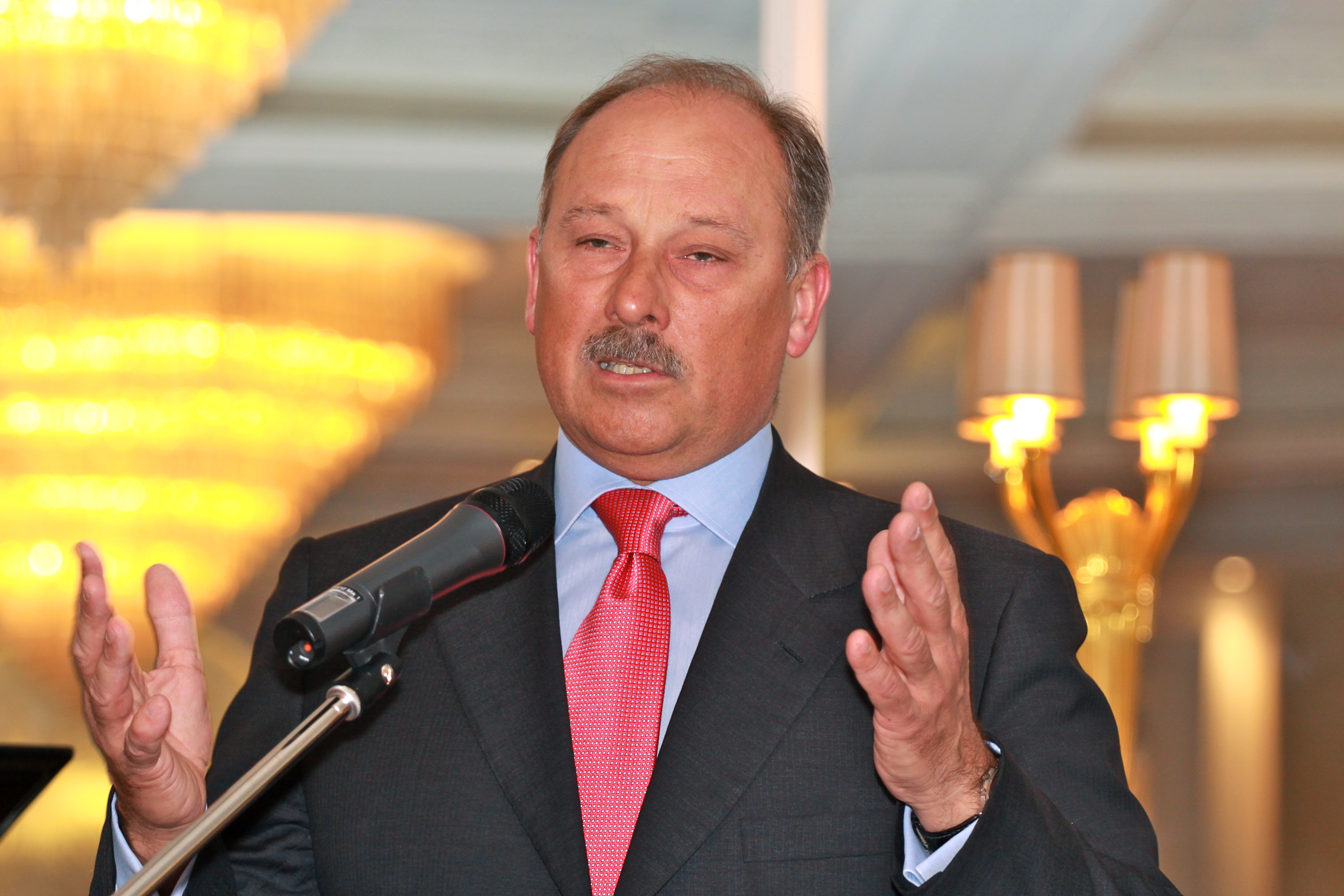
- Vladimir Dmitriev in 2011
- Born: August 25, 1953 (age 73); Moscow
- Occupation: Businessman

Vladimir Alexandrovich Dmitriev (Russian: Влади́мир Алекса́ндрович Дми́триев; born August 25, 1953, Moscow) is a Russian businessman and former chairman of Vnesheconombank, a job he held from May 27, 2004 to February 26, 2016. He was the president of Tennis Europe from 2017 to 2020. From 2004 he is a corresponding Member of the Russian Academy of Natural Sciences.

== Biography ==
In 1975 he graduated from the Moscow Financial Institute. From 2007 he has been a Doctor of Economics (Institute of World Economy and International Relations).

In 1975-1979 he was an engineer for the State Committee of the Council of Ministers of the USSR for External Economic Relations.

In 1979 he started to work at Ministry of Foreign Affairs. In 1986-1987 he worked as a researcher at the Institute of World Economy and International Relations of the USSR Academy of Sciences. In 1992-1993 he was the first secretary of the Russian Embassy in Sweden.

In 1993-1995 he worked at the Ministry of Finance of the Russian Federation (Deputy Head of the Currency Department). In 1995-1997 he was Deputy Head of the Department of Foreign Loans and External Debt of the Ministry of Finance.

In 1997 he was appointed First Deputy Chairman of the Bank for Foreign Economic Activity of the USSR.

In June 2002 Vladimir became Deputy President and Chairman of the Board of Vneshtorgbank (VTB).

May 27, 2004 Dmitriev was appointed Chairman of VEB (by decree of the President of the Russian Federation Vladimir Putin).

On April 20, 2016 he was appointed Vice President of the Chamber of Commerce and Industry of the Russian Federation.

Since 2011 he has been the head of the Department of Public-Private Partnership at the Financial University under the Government of the Russian Federation.

Since 2009 he has been the chairman of the Board of Directors of Globex bank and Chairman of the Supervisory Board of the Joint-Stock Commercial Industrial and Investment Bank.

In 2011-2015 he was Chairman of the Board of Directors of the United Aircraft Corporation (UAC).

In 2006-2007 and 2008-2009 he was the chairman of the Council of the Interbank Association of the Shanghai Cooperation Organization.

== Awards ==
- Order of Alexander Nevsky (2012)
- Order "For Merit to the Fatherland" IV degree (2008)
- Order of Honour (2003)
- Medal of the Order "For Merit to the Fatherland" II degree(1999)
- Order of Friendship
- Order of St. Sergius of Radonezh II degree
- Order of Holy Prince Daniel of Moscow II degree
- Order of the Banner of the Republika Srpska with a golden wreath
- Order of Merit of the Italian Republic

== Personal life ==
Vladimir Dmitriev is married. He has two sons.

Dmitriev's hobbies are literature, theater, sports.
