= Anton Siluanov =

Russian politician and economist (born 1963)

- Антон Силуанов
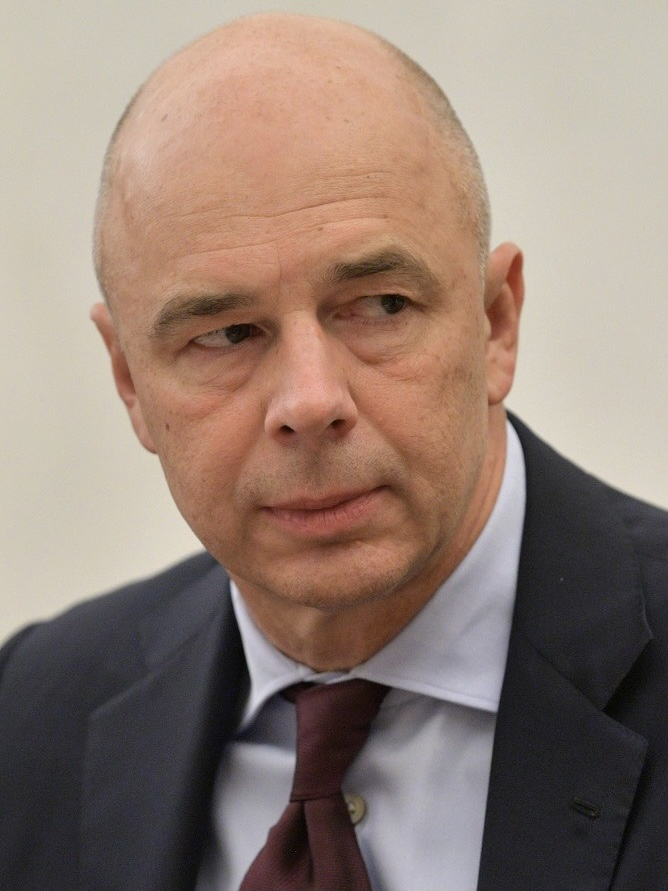
- Siluanov in 2019

Deputy Prime Minister of Russia
- Incumbent
- Assumed office 22 October 2026
- Prime Minister: Mikhail Mishustin

Minister of Finance
- Incumbent
- Assumed office 27 September 2011
- Prime Minister: Vladimir Putin; Dmitry Medvedev; Mikhail Mishustin
- Preceded by: Alexei Kudrin

First Deputy Prime Minister of Russia
- In office 18 May 2018 – 15 January 2020; Acting: 15 – 21 January 2020
- Prime Minister: Dmitry Medvedev
- Preceded by: Igor Shuvalov
- Succeeded by: Andrey Belousov

Personal details
- Born: 12 April 1963 (age 63) Moscow, Soviet Union
- Party: United Russia
- Education: Moscow Finance Institute

Anton Germanovich Siluanov (Note: In this name that follows East Slavic naming customs, the patronymic is Germanovich and the family name is Siluanov.) (Russian: Антон Германович Силуанов, IPA: [ɐnˈton ˈɡʲɛrmənəvʲɪtɕ sʲɪlʊˈanəf]; born 12 April 1963) is a Russian politician and economist who has served as Deputy Prime Minister of Russia since October 2026 and Minister of Finance since December 2011. He has the federal state civilian service rank of 1st class Active State Councillor of the Russian Federation.

In 2011, he was appointed finance minister by Prime Minister Vladimir Putin substituting in this position Alexei Kudrin, who was dismissed by President Dmitry Medvedev after publicly criticizing the additional defense spending of 2.1 trillion rubles (US$66 billion) through 2014. Siluanov served as First Deputy Prime Minister of Russia during Medvedev's premiership from 2018 to 2020.

== Biography ==
In 1985, Siluanov graduated from the Moscow Finance Institute with a degree in "Finance and credit". In 1994, he obtained a Candidate of Sciences (PhD equal) degree in economics.

From August 1985 to March 1987, Siluanov served as a senior economist for the Ministry of Finance of the Russian Soviet Federative Socialist Republic. From March 1987 to May 1989, he was drafted and served in the Soviet Army.

From May 1989 to January 1992, he was a senior economist, a department head and a chief consultant and adviser for the Ministry of Finance. In February 1992, he was appointed Deputy Head of the Ministry of Economics and Finance of the Russian Federation. From February 1992 to October 1997, he was the Deputy Head of Budget Office and Deputy Head of Budget Department of the Russian Ministry of Finance.

From October 1997 to July 2003, Siluanov led macro-economic policy and banking activities at the Russian Ministry of Finance.

On 22 March 2001, he became a member of the Board of the Ministry of Finance. From July 2003 to May 2004, he was the Deputy Minister of Finance, and from May 2004 to 12 December 2005, he served as Director of the intergovernmental relations of the Ministry of Finance of Russia, Deputy Minister.

On 27 September 2011, the Prime Minister of Russia, Vladimir Putin, appointed him as Acting Minister of Finance of Russia, replacing in office the long-term minister, Alexei Kudrin. Prime Minister Vladimir Putin, who announced the appointment at a government meeting on 27 September 2011, after it was approved by Medvedev, said Siluanov was a "good, solid specialist." First Deputy Prime Minister Igor Shuvalov will take over the responsibilities Kudrin had as the deputy prime minister in charge of the economy. Alexey Kudrin will be replaced by Anton Siluanov in International Monetary Fund, World Bank and in Eurasian Anticrisis economic Fund — ACF (Антикризисном фонде ЕврАзЭС) under Eurasian Development Bank.

== Minister of Finance ==
On 26 March 2014, the IMF secured an $18bn bailout fund for Ukraine in the aftermath of the Revolution of Dignity. It remains unclear whether Siluanov approved the use of Russian money for this purpose, or whether he was able to prevent this by withholding consent. Russia has a seat to itself amongst 24 on the Executive Board of the IMF, whereas its monetary contribution to the IMF is inferior to two countries who have no such seat.

== U.S. sanctions target ==
In response to the 2022 Russian invasion of Ukraine, on 6 April 2022 the Office of Foreign Assets Control of the United States Department of the Treasury added Siluanov to its list of persons sanctioned pursuant to Executive Order 14024.

== Awards ==
- Order "For Merit to the Fatherland", 3rd class (2013)
- Order For Merit to the Fatherland, 4th class (2011)
- Russian Federation Presidential Certificate of Honour (2010)
- Medal of the Order "For Merit to the Fatherland", 1st class (2007)
- Letter of Gratitude from the President of the Russian Federation (2012, 2002)
- Prize of the Minister of Finance (2002)
- Diploma of the Ministry of Finance (2001)

== Notes ==
Political offices
| Preceded by Igor Shuvalov | First Deputy Prime Minister; 2018–2020 | Succeeded by Andrey Belousov |
| Preceded by Alexei Kudrin | Minister of Finance; 2011–present | Incumbent |
