= Gokhran =

Russian precious metals fund

- Гохран
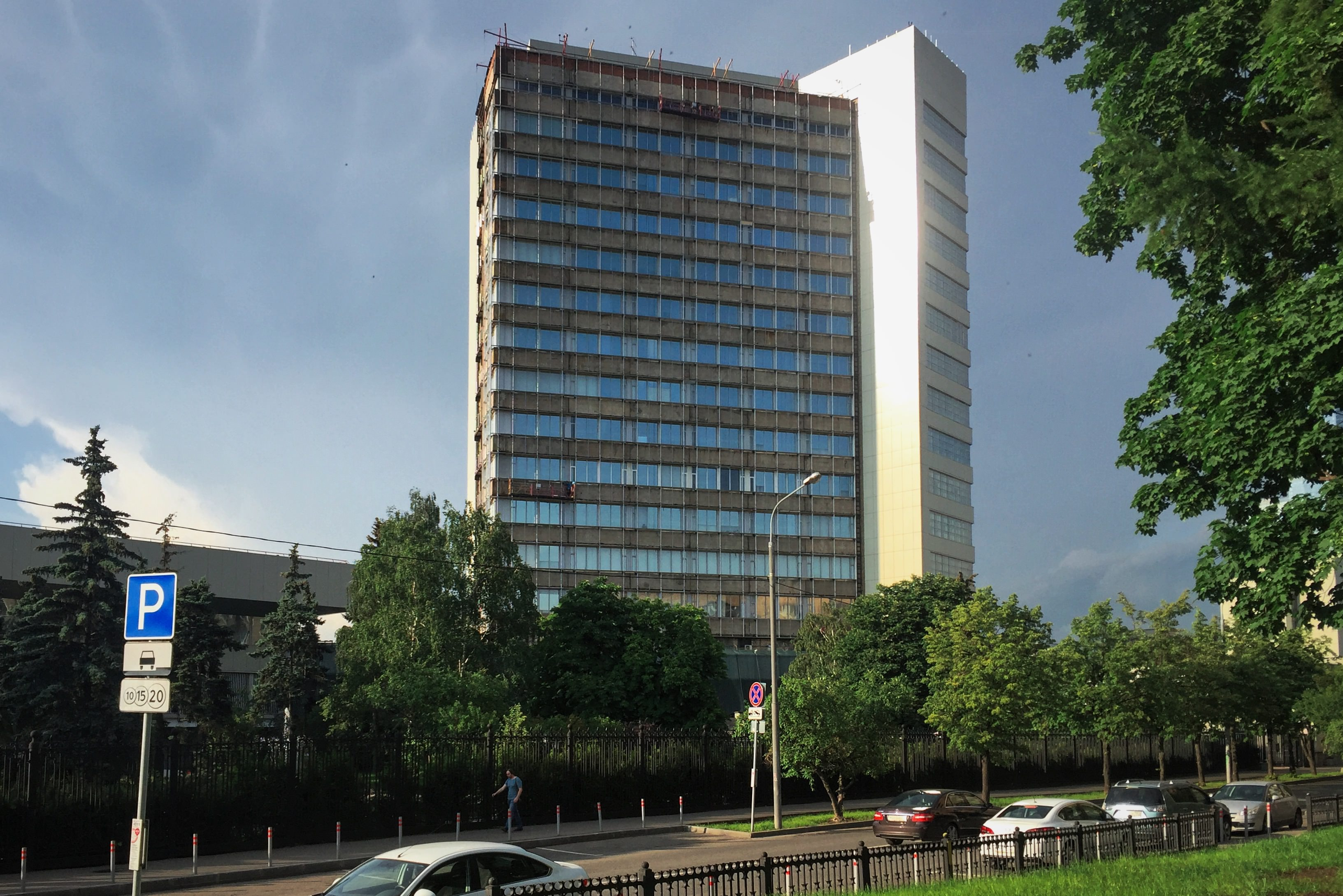
- A Gokhran facility pictured in 2016.

Agency overview
- Formed: 3 February 1920; 106 years ago
- Headquarters: 14, 1812 Goda Street, Dorogomilovo, Moscow, Russia; 55.7429°N 37.5203°E
- Agency executive: Andrey Yurin
- Parent agency: Ministry of Finance
- Website: www.gokhran.ru

The Gokhran (Russian: Гохран) or Gokhran of Russia (Гохран России) (Note: Full name: State Administration under the Ministry of Finance for the Formation of the State Fund of Precious Metals and Precious Stones, storage, dispensing and use of precious metals and precious stones, Russian: Государственное учреждение по формированию Государственного фонда драгоценных металлов и драгоценных камней Российской Федерации, хранению, отпуску и использованию драгоценных металлов и драгоценных камней при Министерстве финансов Российской Федерации) is a state institution under the Russian Ministry of Finance, responsible for the State Fund of Precious Metals and Precious Stones of the Russian Federation. It is responsible for the purchase, storage, sale, and use of precious metals, precious stones, jewellery, rocks, and minerals by the State Fund.

== History ==
The Gokhran was created by the Council of People's Commissars of the Russian Soviet Federative Socialist Republic decree of 3 February 1920. In the first post-revolutionary years, Gokhran collected the jewelry of the Romanovs, the Kremlin Armoury, the Russian Orthodox Church and other religious communities, as well as valuables confiscated from private collections.

Since 1960, the Gokhran has been part of the USSR Ministry of Finance as the 3rd special department and later the 3rd chief directorate. In 1987 it was reformed into the USSR state storage of valuables. In 1991, it received the status of the committee for precious metals and stones under the Ministry of economy and finance of Russia, and was finally re-established as Gokhran by Government Resolution №1378 (21 November 1996). After its first year of operation, embezzlers attempted to steal from the Gokhran, and were later executed.

In 2001, four senior Gokhran officials were convicted of stealing $187 million in materials from the institution.

During the 2008 financial crisis, the Government of Russia bought $1 billion in uncut diamonds from the Russian diamond miner Alrosa, in order to support the Russian diamond mining industry while avoiding saturation in the global diamond market and thus further depression of diamond prices. The diamond mining industry is critical to the Yakutia economy.

In 2015, Russian business newspaper Kommersant reported that four large rough diamonds were allegedly missing from a consignment held at Gokhran after being replaced with smaller stones of equivalent total weight. The missing diamonds were estimated by industry analysts to be worth several million U.S. dollars, though Gokhran did not comment on the allegations.

After Russian diamond miner Alrosa was sanctioned by the UK government in March 2022, the Russian government indicated that the Gokhran may purchase rough diamonds directly from Alrosa to support the business.

Following the sale of gold reserves during the first half of 2026 to finance the Russo-Ukrainian war, Russia later auctioned a portion of the diamond reserves held by the Gokhran to raise additional funds.

== Other holdings ==
Russia's Diamond Fund is a part of Gokhran. Gokhran also holds the Order of Victory medals awarded to Konstantin Rokossovsky and Michał Rola-Żymierski.

In addition to diamonds, the Gokhran stores gold, silver, platinum, emeralds, sapphires, pearls and amber. The size of Gokhran’s facilities is classified.
