= Federal Service for Alcohol and Tobacco Markets Control =

Federal Service for Alcohol and Tobacco Markets Control Федеральная служба по контролю за алкогольным и табачным рынками
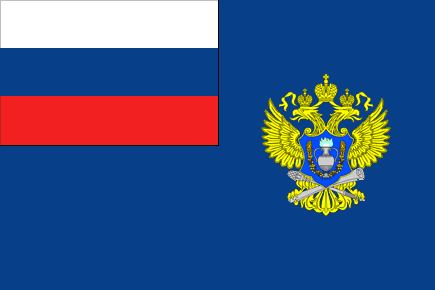
- Common name: Rosalkogoltabakkontrol
- Abbreviation: FSKATR

Agency overview
- Formed: December 31, 2008
- Employees: 940

Jurisdictional structure
- Operations jurisdiction: Russia
- Legal jurisdiction: Russian Federation
- Governing body: Government of Russia

Operational structure
- Headquarters: Miusskaya Square No. 4, Moscow, Russia
- Agency executive: Igor Alyoshin, Director of Federal Service for Alcohol Market regulation
- Parent agency: Ministry of Finance

Website
- fsrar.gov.ru

The Federal Service for Alcohol and Tobacco Markets Control (Russian: Федеральная служба по контролю за алкогольным и табачным рынками, romanized: Federal'naya sluzhba po kontrolyu za alkogol'nym i tabachnym rynkami; abbr. FSKATR [ФСКАТР]) or Rosalkogoltabakkontrol (Росалкогольтабакконтроль) (Note: Known until 2023 as Federal Service for Alcohol Market Regulation (Russian: Федеральная служба по регулированию алкогольного рынка, romanized: Federal'naya sluzhba po regulirovaniyu alkogol'novo rynka), abbreviated FSRAR (ФСРАР) or Rosalkogolregulirovanie (Росалкогольрегулирование).) is a federal law enforcement agency of executive authority responsible for drafting and implementing state policy and legal regulation in the production and circulation of ethyl alcohol and alcohol products, as well as functions to control the production and trafficking ethyl alcohol and alcohol-containing products, to oversee and provide services in this area. The Service is under the jurisdiction of the Federal Government of Russia.

== History ==
The Federal Service for Alcohol Market Regulation was established by Presidential Decree from 31 December 2008 No. 1883 "On the formation of the Federal Service for Alcohol Market Regulation".

In Section 2 of the Government direction from 24 February 2009 No. 154 "On the Federal Service for Alcohol Market Regulation", found that the Federal Service for Alcohol Market Regulation is the unification of various functions from the Ministry of Agriculture, Ministry of Finance, the Federal Tax Service and the Federal Service for Tariff in respect of all obligations in the sphere of production and turnover of ethyl alcohol and alcohol-containing products, including obligations arising from the execution of court decisions.

On November 30, 2009 the Federal Service for Alcohol Market Regulation issued an order No. 17 "On the establishment and administration of the minimum price of vodka for retail sale until January 1, 2010" according to which from 1 January 2010, the minimum price of vodka for retail sale was set at a rate of 89 rubles per 0.5 liter of the finished product (€2.52 per liter circa).

== Directors ==
A list of directors since 2008:

- 2008–2018: Igor Chuyan
- 2018–: Igor Alyoshin

== See also ==
- Alcoholism in Russia
- Bureau of Alcohol, Tobacco, Firearms and Explosives
- Bureau of Prohibition
- Vodka
- Prohibition in the Russian Empire and the Soviet Union
