= Housing in Russia =

Housing in Russia reflects the country's history, geography and traditions. According to Russian Public Opinion Research Center from 2020, 65 percent of Russians live in apartments, 31 percent in a private house and 4 percent in dormitories. The percentage of Russians who own an apartment or a house is relatively high and amounts to about 54 percent. About 11 percent reside in rented residences. The rest live with relatives or friends.

== Recent history ==
Private housing boom began in the 1990s and is still going on. Most private houses are built in the suburbs of large cities. Obtaining a building permit is quite easy and the building regulations for private houses are quite liberal. The house must not be higher than 20 meters and must not have more than 3 floors. It should be located at least 5 meters from the plot border. Brick houses are more common in central and southern regions while wooden houses dominate in the north.

There are no legal restrictions on owning a property in Russia for foreign citizens except owning agricultural lands and properties in the state border zone.

As of 2019, an average price for one square meter in a new apartment amounted to 64 thousand rubles. Around 2024, the average price per square meter for an apartment in Moscow ranges from 200,000 to 300,000 RUB. In prime areas, prices exceed 1 million RUB. In St. Petersburg, the average price per square meter ranges from 140,000 to 180,000 RUB, while in the historic city center, prices start at 400,000 RUB and go up. In other large cities (Yekaterinburg, Novosibirsk, Kazan, Nizhny Novgorod, Vladivostok), prices range from 70,000 to 150,000 RUB, although in prime areas, they are higher. Prices in Sochi, located on the Black Sea coast, rival those in Moscow.

The Human Rights Measurement Initiative finds that Russia is fulfilling 71.7% of what they should be fulfilling for the right to housing, based on their level of income.

== Architecture ==
There are several major types of apartment blocks common in Russia. A Khrushchyovka is probably the most popular type. Usually it is a 4 or 5-storied concrete-paneled or brick apartment building with notoriously small apartments, extensively constructed in the 1960s and 1970s to solve the housing problem. Stalin-era buildings (Stalinka) from 1930s - 1950s are usually larger and more comfortable, however many of them require major renovation. One more type of apartment blocks is Brezhnevka built mostly in the 1970s and 1980s. Apartments there are a bit larger, and the buildings themselves are 9-16 stories high. Finally, the housing boom in 2000s led to wide-scale construction of new apartment buildings from economy to premium class based both on improved Soviet projects and new original decisions.

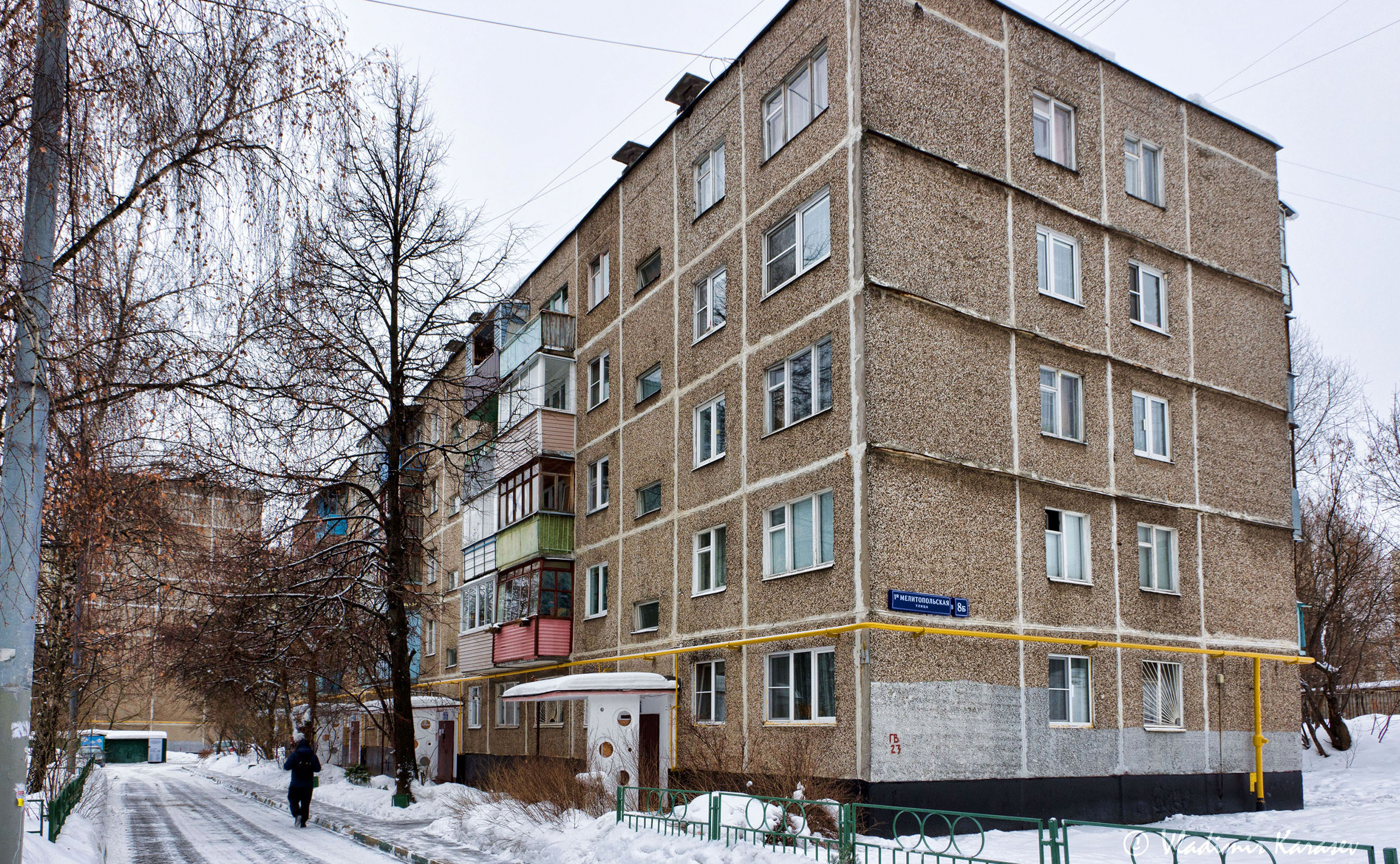
A typical Khrushchyovka in Moscow

A typical Russian apartment includes a kitchen, a lavatory, sometimes a balcony and from one to three rooms. Unlike many other countries, when Russian people describe an apartment, they count all rooms, not just bedrooms. It's a common practice to have only one lavatory in the apartment, though modern apartments may have more lavatories and rooms.

New residential areas have been constructed in the suburbs of Moscow and St. Petersburg since the 2010s to meet the growing housing demand. The buildings are primarily 20- to 30- story blocks, which have faced criticism for their crowded locations. The world’s most crowded apartment block, Novy Okkervil, houses 20,000 people and was built in 2015. It contains 3,708 apartments with 35 entrances and 25 floors. Most apartments are one or two-bedrooms, and there’s an average of around four to six apartments on each floor. The giant apartment complex is situated in the town of Kudrovo, just outside St. Petersburg. Russian people call this kind of complex ‘Cheloveinik‘.
