= Awards of the President (Russia) =

Honorary award bestowed by the President of Russia

Presidential Certificate of Honour of the Russian Federation
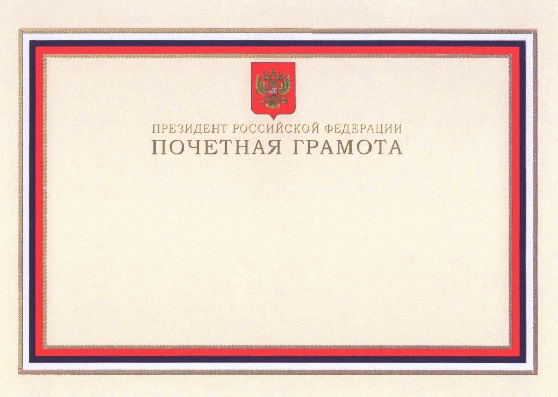
- Presidential Certificate of Honour of the Russian Federation
- Type: State Decoration, Certificate of Honour
- Awarded for: Noteworthy service to the Fatherland
- Presented by: Russian Federation
- Eligibility: Citizens of the Russian Federation
- Status: Active
- Established: April 11, 2008
- First award: July 11, 2008
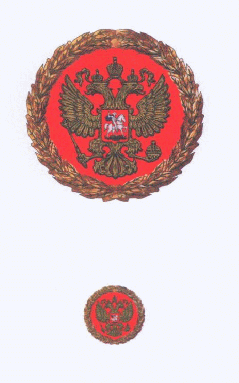
- Badge of the Presidential Certificate of Honour of the Russian Federation

Precedence
- Next (lower): Letter of Gratitude from the President of the Russian Federation

Awards of the President of the Russian Federation constitute a special category of awards in the Russian Federation, established and bestowed on behalf of the President of Russia. These include the Russian Federation Presidential Certificate of Honour, the Letter of Gratitude from the President of the Russian Federation, as well as other awards.

== Presidential Certificate of Honour of the Russian Federation ==
The Presidential Certificate of Honour of the Russian Federation is an award of the President of the Russian Federation, a form of encouragement for meritorious service in the defense of the Fatherland and ensuring the security of the state, strengthening the rule of law, protecting health and life, protecting the rights and freedoms of citizens, state building, economy, science, culture, art, education, enlightenment, sports, charitable activities, and other merits before the state.

=== Regulations ===
The Certificate is awarded to statesmen, prominent figures in the fields of science, culture, art, education, enlightenment, and sports, respected representatives of the public and business communities, and citizens of the Russian Federation who have made a significant contribution to the implementation of the state policy of the Russian Federation and, as a rule, have broad public recognition.

The Certificate is presented by the President of the Russian Federation in a solemn ceremony, or on their behalf by the Chief of Staff of the Presidential Administration, the Plenipotentiary Representative of the President of the Russian Federation in a Federal District, or by another official delegated by the Chief of Staff of the Presidential Administration.

=== History ===
The Certificate was established by Presidential Decree No. 487 of April 11, 2008, "On the Certificate of Honour of the President of the Russian Federation and the Letter of Gratitude from the President of the Russian Federation".

This decree approved the Regulations on the Presidential Certificate of Honour, the Regulations on the Letter of Gratitude from the President of the Russian Federation, a specimen of the Certificate form, and a description and drawing of the badge to the Certificate.

The Presidential Certificate of Honour of the Russian Federation is a form of encouragement.

=== Badge ===
The badge is silver-gilt, 20 mm in diameter, and consists of a circular golden laurel wreath.

On the obverse, the field of the wreath is covered with ruby enamel, and in the center is a superimposed image of the Coat of arms of Russia.

On the reverse is a device for attaching to clothing and a serial number.

== Letter of Gratitude from the President of the Russian Federation ==
Letter of Gratitude from the President of the Russian Federation
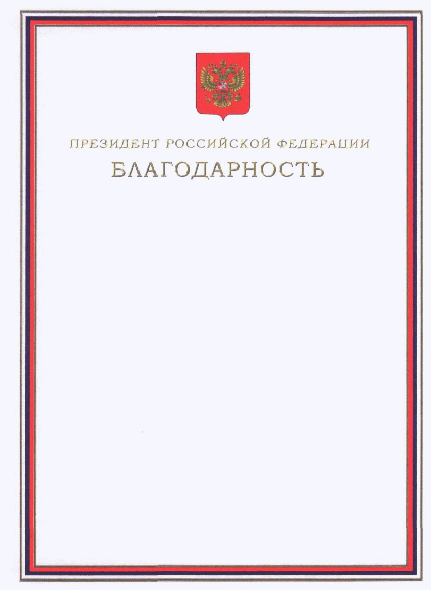
- Letter of Gratitude from the President of the Russian Federation
- Type: State Award, Letter of Gratitude
- Awarded for: Significant contributions to the Russian Federation
- Presented by: Russian Federation
- Eligibility: Citizens of the Russian Federation, Organizations
- Status: Active
- Established: April 11, 2008

Precedence
- Next (higher): Presidential Certificate of Honour of the Russian Federation

Letter of Gratitude from the President of the Russian Federation was established by Presidential Decree No. 487 of April 11, 2008, "On the Certificate of Honour of the President of the Russian Federation and the Letter of Gratitude from the President of the Russian Federation."

This decree approved the Regulations on the Presidential Certificate of Honour and the Regulations on expressing Gratitude from the President of the Russian Federation, and a sample of the Letter of Gratitude form. In accordance with the Regulations, the Letter of Gratitude from the President of the Russian Federation is a form of encouragement for meritorious service in the defense of the Fatherland and ensuring the security of the state, strengthening the rule of law, protecting health and life, protecting the rights and freedoms of citizens, state building, economy, science, culture, art, education, enlightenment, sports, charitable activities, and other merits before the state.

The Letter of Gratitude from the President of the Russian Federation is announced to citizens of the Russian Federation, as well as to teams of enterprises, organizations, and institutions, regardless of the form of ownership.

== Benefits and Incentives ==
According to Presidential Decree No. 765 of July 25, 2006, "On a One-Time Incentive for Persons Undergoing Federal Public Service" (2024), when encouraged by the President of the Russian Federation, a one-time incentive is paid in the amount of two months' salary (for prosecutors – in the amount of two official salaries and in double the amount of the allowance for class rank).
