= Ministry of Finance (Russia) =

Government minister of Russia

Ministry of Finance of the Russian Federation
- Министерство финансов Российской Федерации; Ministerstvo Finansov Rossiiskoi Federatsii
- Emblem

- Digital emblem

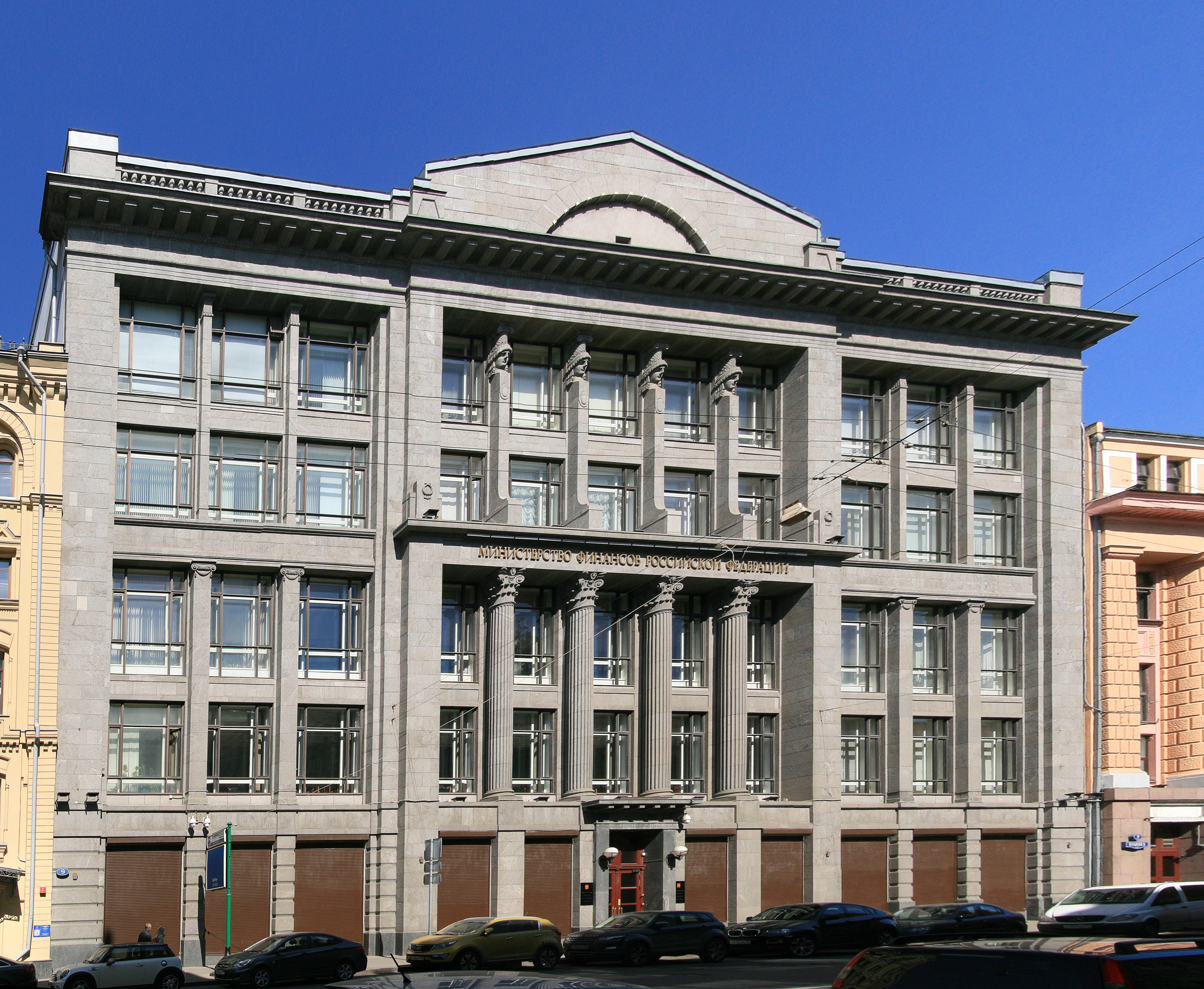
- Headquarters of the ministry in Moscow

Agency overview
- Formed: October 24, 1780, as Expedition of state revenues
- Preceding agency: Expedition of state revenues Ministry of Finance of the Russian Empire Ministry of Finance of the USSR
- Jurisdiction: Federal government of the Russian Federation
- Headquarters: Ilinka Street 9, Moscow; 55°45′19″N 37°37′35″E
- Annual budget: 1611.8 billion rouble (FY 2011)
- Agency executives: Anton Siluanov, Minister of Finance; Sergei Shatalov, State Secretary-Deputy Minister of Finance; Roman Artyukhin, Federal Treasurer of Russia
- Child agencies: Federal Tax Service; Federal Agency for State Property Management; Federal Treasury; Federal Customs Service; Federal Service for Alcohol Market Regulation; Gokhran
- Website: minfin.gov.ru

The Ministry of Finance of the Russian Federation (Russian: Министерство финансов Российской Федерации), also known as MinFin (Минфин России), is a ministry of the Government of Russia responsible for financial policy and general management in the field of finance.

The Ministry of Finance was formed from the Ministry of Finance of the USSR in 1992 and claims descent from the Ministry of Finance of the Russian Empire first established in 1780. It is headquartered at Ilinka Street 9 in Tverskoy District, Moscow.

Anton Siluanov has served as the Minister of Finance since September 2011.

== History ==
The Treasury Governing body in Russia was established by Imperial Decree of Catherine II in October 24, 1780, as The Expedition of state revenues, which was, in fact, the beginning of the creation of state financial authority in Russia.

Manifesto of the Emperor Alexander I "On approval of the Ministries" was founded several ministries, including Ministry of Finance of the Russian Empire.

In the Soviet Union, the Ministry was renamed as the Ministry of Finance (MOF USSR), which combines the Treasury of the Soviet republics, in particular the Ministry of Finance of the RSFSR.

The Ministry of Finance of the Russian Soviet Federative Socialist Republic was part of the Council of Ministers of the RSFSR and was under the authority of the Soviet Ministry of Finance under The Council of Ministers of the USSR, the official name of the Soviet government.

By Decree of the President of the RSFSR from November 11, 1991 (Presidential Decree № 190) The Ministry of Finance was merged with the Ministry of Economy of and the new ministry was called the Ministry of Economy and Finance of the Russian Federative Republic. Under Resolution of the Government of the Russian Federative Soviet Republic (later the Government of Russia) from November 15, 1991 (Resolution № 8) the Ministry of Finance was liquidated and its businesses and organizations transferred to the Ministry of Economy and Finance of the Russian Soviet Federative Socialist Republic.

From December 25, 1991, to February 19, 1992, the Ministry was called Ministry of Economy and Finance. By Presidential Decree of February 19, 1992 № 156, it was again divided into two ministries - the Ministry of the Economy and Finance Ministry.

Because of its annexation of Crimea, a number of Western countries aimed sanctions at Russia, with personal financial transactions by certain Russian individuals proscribed. Among these sanctioned individuals were Arkady Rotenberg and Boris Rotenberg, who also happened to be shareholders of certain Russian banks. On 24 March, MasterCard and Visa declined to permit transactions at these banks for a number of hours, ostensibly because they had misinterpreted the sanctions document. Anton Siluanov, then-current Minister of Finance, told reporters on 26 March that he had revived plans to develop a Russian alternative card payment system to cut its dependence on Visa and MasterCard after these disruptions in their service. Siluanov said that "The payments restriction by Visa and Mastercard at one bank made us start thinking very seriously how we can secure ourselves against this kind of cases." President Vladimir Putin agreed the next day in conference with legislators: "This wasn’t our decision. We need to defend our interests. And we’ll do that. It is really too bad that certain companies have decided on [...] restrictions. I think this will simply cause them to lose certain segments of the market - a very profitable market."

== Structure ==
=== Departments ===
- Department of administration and control
- Department of budgetary policy and methodology
- Department of tax policy and customs schedule
- Department of state debt and state financial assets
- Department of financial policy
- Department of regional budgets
- Department of regulation of state financial control, auditing, accounting and records
- Law Department
- Department of budgetary policy in the sphere of military and law enforcement service and the state defense order
- Administrative Department
- Department of budgetary policy in the sphere of social welfare and science
- Department of budgetary policy in the sphere of state management, judicial and public service
- Department of development and execution of federal budget
- Department of international financial relations
- Department of information technologies in the sphere of budgeting and state and local finance management
- Department of budgetary policy in the sphere of transport, roads, natural resources and agriculture
- Department of budgetary policy in the sphere of innovation, civil industry, energetics, communication and public-private partnership

=== Subordinate authorities ===
- Federal Tax Service
- Federal Agency for State Property Management
- Federal Treasury
- Federal Customs Service
- Federal Service for Alcohol Market Regulation
- Gokhran
- Goznak
